= 1997 Alabama Crimson Tide baseball team =

American college baseball season

1997 Alabama Crimson Tide baseball

SEC Tournament champions South II Regional champions

College World Series, runner-up
- Conference: Southeastern Conference
- Western Division
- Record: 56–14 (20–9 SEC)
- Head coach: Jim Wells (3rd season)
- Home stadium: Sewell–Thomas Stadium

1997 Southeastern Conference baseball standings
	Conf.				Overall
Team	W		L	PCT	W		L	PCT
Eastern
No. 20 Florida ^{x}‍‍‍^{y}	17	–	13	.567	40	–	24	.625
No. 22 Tennessee ^{x}‍‍‍^{y}	17	–	13	.567	42	–	19	.689
Vanderbilt ‍‍‍	14	–	16	.467	31	–	24	.564
South Carolina ‍‍‍	13	–	17	.433	33	–	24	.579
Kentucky ‍‍‍	10	–	20	.333	20	–	34	.370
Georgia ‍‍‍	8	–	22	.267	28	–	27	.509
Western
No. 1 LSU ^{x}‍†‍‍^{y}	22	–	7	.759	57	–	13	.814
No. 2 Alabama ‍‍‡‍^{y}	20	–	9	.690	56	–	14	.800
No. 6 Mississippi State ‍‍‍^{y}	19	–	11	.633	47	–	21	.691
No. 5 Auburn ‍‍‍^{y}	17	–	12	.586	50	–	17	.746
Arkansas ‍‍‍	15	–	14	.517	36	–	20	.643
Ole Miss ‍‍‍	6	–	24	.200	22	–	31	.415
x – Division champion † – Conference champion ‡ – Tournament champion y – Invited to the NCAA tournament As of June 30, 1997; Rankings from Collegiate Baseball

The 1997 Alabama Crimson Tide baseball team represented the University of Alabama in the 1997 NCAA Division I baseball season. The Crimson Tide played their home games at Sewell–Thomas Stadium, and were led by third-year head coach Jim Wells. They finished as the national runner-up after falling to LSU in the 1997 College World Series Final.

== Roster ==
1997 Alabama Crimson Tide roster
Pitchers: Jarrod Kingrey - Junior	Catchers: Matt Frick - Junior; Infielders: Joe Caruso - Senior; Andy Phillips - Sophomore	Outfielders: G. W. Keller - Sophomore; Dustan Mohr; Dave Tidwell; Roberto Vaz	Coaching staff: Jim Wells – Head Coach

== Schedule ==
Legend
Alabama win
Alabama loss

1997 Alabama Crimson Tide baseball game log
Regular season
February (10–0)

Date	Opponent	Stadium	Score	Overall Record	SEC Record
February 14	Marshall	Sewell–Thomas Stadium	8–2	1–0	–
February 15	Marshall	Sewell–Thomas Stadium	17–4	2–0	–
February 16	Marshall	Sewell–Thomas Stadium	16–0	3–0	–
February 18	Louisiana Tech	Sewell–Thomas Stadium	9–3	4–0	–
February 19	Louisiana Tech	Sewell–Thomas Stadium	13–7	5–0	–
February 21	Michigan	Sewell–Thomas Stadium	21–3	6–0	–
February 22	Michigan	Sewell–Thomas Stadium	19–3	7–0	–
February 23	Michigan	Sewell–Thomas Stadium	22–7	8–0	–
February 25	Middle Tennessee	Sewell–Thomas Stadium	15–5	9–0	–
February 28	Illinois	Sewell–Thomas Stadium	9–2	10–0	–

March (15–4)

Date	Opponent	Stadium	Score	Overall Record	SEC Record
March 1	Illinois	Sewell–Thomas Stadium	5–3	11–0	–
March 2	Illinois	Sewell–Thomas Stadium	6–5	12–0	–
March 4	Duquesne	Sewell–Thomas Stadium	11–0	13–0	–
March 7	Georgia	Sewell–Thomas Stadium	15–6	14–0	1–0
March 8	Georgia	Sewell–Thomas Stadium	10–6	15–0	2–0
March 9	Georgia	Sewell–Thomas Stadium	6–11	15–1	2–1
March 11	Winthrop	Sewell–Thomas Stadium	7–2	16–1	2–1
March 12	Winthrop	Sewell–Thomas Stadium	9–7	17–1	2–1
March 14	at Florida	Alfred A. McKethan Stadium	6–4	18–1	3–1
March 15	at Florida	Alfred A. McKethan Stadium	13–9	19–1	4–1
March 16	at Florida	Alfred A. McKethan Stadium	4–9	19–2	4–2
March 19	UAB	Sewell–Thomas Stadium	11–2	20–2	4–2
March 21	at Tennessee	Lindsey Nelson Stadium	3–2	21–2	5–2
March 22	at Tennessee	Lindsey Nelson Stadium	7–8	21–3	5–3
March 23	at Tennessee	Lindsey Nelson Stadium	2–9	21–4	5–4
March 25	at Southern Mississippi	Pete Taylor Park	19–14	22–4	5–4
March 28	Vanderbilt	Sewell–Thomas Stadium	8–2	23–4	6–4
March 29	Vanderbilt	Sewell–Thomas Stadium	6–3	24–4	7–4
March 29	Vanderbilt	Sewell–Thomas Stadium	14–2	25–4	8–4

April (14–6)

Date	Opponent	Stadium	Score	Overall Record	SEC Record
April 1	South Alabama	Sewell–Thomas Stadium	9–8	26–4	8–4
April 2	at Middle Tennessee	Reese Smith Jr. Field	3–2	27–4	8–4
April 4	Kentucky	Sewell–Thomas Stadium	10–3	27–4	9–4
April 5	Kentucky	Sewell–Thomas Stadium	2–9	28–5	9–5
April 6	Kentucky	Sewell–Thomas Stadium	9–5	29–5	10–5
April 8	Southern Mississippi	Sewell–Thomas Stadium	14–6	30–5	10–5
April 9	UAB	Sewell–Thomas Stadium	2–10	30–6	10–5
April 12	at Auburn	Plainsman Park	8–13	30–7	10–6
April 12	at Auburn	Plainsman Park	22–7	31–7	11–6
April 13	at Auburn	Plainsman Park	12–11	32–7	12–6
April 15	at South Alabama	Eddie Stanky Field	7–8	32–8	12–6
April 16	at Samford	Joe Lee Griffin Stadium	4–2	33–8	12–6
April 18	at Mississippi State	Dudy Noble Field	10–11	33–9	12–7
April 19	at Mississippi State	Dudy Noble Field	7–9	33–10	12–8
April 20	at Mississippi State	Dudy Noble Field	6–3	34–10	13–8
April 23	West Alabama	Sewell–Thomas Stadium	10–9	35–10	13–8
April 23	West Alabama	Sewell–Thomas Stadium	15–4	36–10	13–8
April 25	Arkansas	Sewell–Thomas Stadium	11–10	37–10	14–8
April 26	Arkansas	Sewell–Thomas Stadium	13–2	38–10	15–8
April 29	Samford	Sewell–Thomas Stadium	4–3	39–10	15–8

May (5–1)

Date	Opponent	Stadium	Score	Overall Record	SEC Record
May 3	at Ole Miss	Swayze Field	8–2	40–10	16–8
May 3	at Ole Miss	Swayze Field	14–7	41–10	17–8
May 4	at Ole Miss	Swayze Field	9–5	42–10	18–8
May 9	LSU	Sewell–Thomas Stadium	6–4	43–10	19–8
May 10	LSU	Sewell–Thomas Stadium	28–2	44–10	20–8
May 10	LSU	Sewell–Thomas Stadium	4–6	44–11	20–9

Postseason
SEC Tournament (4–1)

Date	Opponent	Site/stadium	Score	Overall record	SEC record
May 15	vs Mississippi State	Golden Park	16–3	45–11	20–9
May 16	vs Florida	Golden Park	13–6	46–11	20–9
May 17	vs LSU	Golden Park	7–12	46–12	20–9
May 17	vs Florida	Golden Park	6–3	47–12	20–9
May 18	vs LSU	Golden Park	12–2	48–12	20–9

South II Regional (4–0)

Date	Opponent	Site/stadium	Score	Overall record	SEC record
May 22	Troy	Sewell–Thomas Stadium	8–5	49–12	20–9
May 23	Wichita State	Sewell–Thomas Stadium	6–2	50–12	20–9
May 24	NC State	Sewell–Thomas Stadium	6–3	51–12	20–9
May 25	USC	Sewell–Thomas Stadium	9–8	52–12	20–9

1997 College World Series (4–2)

Date	Opponent	Site/stadium	Score	Overall record	SEC record
March 31	vs Mississippi State	Johnny Rosenblatt Stadium	3–2	53–12	20–9
June 2	vs Miami (FL)	Johnny Rosenblatt Stadium	1–6	53–13	20–9
June 3	vs Mississippi State	Johnny Rosenblatt Stadium	9–5	54–13	20–9
June 5	vs Miami (FL)	Johnny Rosenblatt Stadium	8–6	55–13	20–9
June 6	vs Miami (FL)	Johnny Rosenblatt Stadium	8–2	56–13	20–9
June 7	vs LSU	Johnny Rosenblatt Stadium	6–13	56–14	20–9

== Awards and honors ==
Dave Magadan

- College World Series All-Tournament Team
- Golden Spikes Award

Tim Meacham

- College World Series All-Tournament Team

== Crimson Tide in the 1997 MLB draft ==
The following members of the Alabama Crimson Tide baseball program were drafted in the 1997 Major League Baseball draft.

Player	Position	Round	Overall	MLB team
Roberto Vaz	OF	7th	215th	Oakland Athletics
Dustan Mohr	OF	9th	448th	Cleveland Indians
Joe Caruso	2B	7th	331st	Kansas City Royals
Dave Tidwell	OF	16th	488th	Cincinnati Reds
