= 1997 Auburn Tigers baseball team =

American college baseball season

1997 Auburn Tigers baseball

NCAA East Regional champions

College World Series, 1–2
- Conference: Southeastern Conference
- Western Division

Ranking
- Coaches: No. 5
- CB: No. 5
- Record: 50–17 (17–12 SEC)
- Head coach: Hal Baird (13th season)
- Home stadium: Plainsman Park

1997 Southeastern Conference baseball standings
	Conf.				Overall
Team	W		L	PCT	W		L	PCT
Eastern
No. 20 Florida ^{x}‍‍‍^{y}	17	–	13	.567	40	–	24	.625
No. 22 Tennessee ^{x}‍‍‍^{y}	17	–	13	.567	42	–	19	.689
Vanderbilt ‍‍‍	14	–	16	.467	31	–	24	.564
South Carolina ‍‍‍	13	–	17	.433	33	–	24	.579
Kentucky ‍‍‍	10	–	20	.333	20	–	34	.370
Georgia ‍‍‍	8	–	22	.267	28	–	27	.509
Western
No. 1 LSU ^{x}‍†‍‍^{y}	22	–	7	.759	57	–	13	.814
No. 2 Alabama ‍‍‡‍^{y}	20	–	9	.690	56	–	14	.800
No. 6 Mississippi State ‍‍‍^{y}	19	–	11	.633	47	–	21	.691
No. 5 Auburn ‍‍‍^{y}	17	–	12	.586	50	–	17	.746
Arkansas ‍‍‍	15	–	14	.517	36	–	20	.643
Ole Miss ‍‍‍	6	–	24	.200	22	–	31	.415
x – Division champion † – Conference champion ‡ – Tournament champion y – Invited to the NCAA tournament As of June 30, 1997; Rankings from Collegiate Baseball

The 1997 Auburn Tigers baseball team represented Auburn University in the 1997 NCAA Division I baseball season. The Tigers played their home games at Plainsman Park. They were led by head coach Hal Baird, in his thirteenth season as head coach of the program.

The Tigers reached the College World Series, where they finished tied for 5th after a loss to Stanford, a win against Rice, and another loss to Stanford.

== Personnel ==
=== Roster ===
1997 Auburn Tigers roster
Pitchers: 13 - Eric Wood; 15 - Tim Hudson; 16 - George Jones; 18 - Ryan Reese; 29 - Josh Hancock; 30 - Finley Woodward; 32 - Alex Merriott; 34 - Patrick Dunham; 41 - Jeremiah Smith; 44 - Brent Schoening; 45 - Colter Bean; 46 - Bryan Hebson; 47 - Kevin Knorst	Catchers: 17 - Patrick Wooton; 20 - Casey Dunn; 21 - David Ross; Outfielders: 3 - Adam Sullivan; 5 - Josh Davis; 12 - Jason Gregory; 24 - Tucker Dearth; 26 - Hank Stepleton	Infielders: 2 - Rob Macrory; 4 - Derek Reif; 7 - Harrel Hill; 8 - Heath Kelly; 10 - Jamie Kersh; 11 - Chad Wandall; 22 - Nate Hare; 25 - Brian Davidson; 27 - Josh Etheredge; 37 - Stephen Chambless

== Schedule and results ==
1997 Auburn Tigers baseball game log
Regular season

February (12–0)
Date	Opponent	Site/stadium	Score	Overall record	SEC record
February 7	Morehead State*	Plainsman Park • Auburn, AL	W 15–5	1–0	–
February 8	Morehead State*	Plainsman Park • Auburn, AL	W 17–2	2–0	–
February 9	Morehead State*	Plainsman Park • Auburn, AL	W 4–2	3–0	–
February 11	Mercer*	Plainsman Park • Auburn, AL	W 18–3	4–0	–
Coca-Cola Classic
February 15	vs. Southern Miss*	Eddie Stanky Field • Mobile, AL	W 4–3	5–0	–
February 16	vs. South Alabama*	Eddie Stanky Field • Mobile, AL	W 17–3	6–0	–
February 20	Troy State*	Plainsman Park • Auburn, AL	W 10–7	7–0	–
February 22	Middle Tennessee*	Plainsman Park • Auburn, AL	W 4–1	8–0	–
February 22	Middle Tennessee*	Plainsman Park • Auburn, AL	W 11–7	9–0	–
February 23	Middle Tennessee*	Plainsman Park • Auburn, AL	W 9–3	10–0	–
February 25	Winthrop*	Plainsman Park • Auburn, AL	W 13–7	11–0	–
February 26	Winthrop*	Plainsman Park • Auburn, AL	W 5–3	12–0	–

March (16–3)
Date	Opponent	Site/stadium	Score	Overall record	SEC record
March 1	Duquesne*	Plainsman Park • Auburn, AL	W 11–2	13–0	–
March 2	Duquesne*	Plainsman Park • Auburn, AL	W 11–0	14–0	–
March 3	Duquesne*	Plainsman Park • Auburn, AL	W 11–5	15–0	–
March 4	at Samford*	Joe Lee Griffin Stadium • Homewood, AL	W 7–0	16–0	–
March 5	Davidson*	Plainsman Park • Auburn, AL	W 14–3	17–0	–
March 7	at South Carolina	Sarge Frye Field • Columbia, SC	L 3–17	17–1	0–1
March 8	at South Carolina	Sarge Frye Field • Columbia, SC	W 10–6	18–1	1–1
March 9	at South Carolina	Sarge Frye Field • Columbia, SC	W 21–6	19–1	2–1
March 12	William & Mary*	Plainsman Park • Auburn, AL	W 10–8	20–1	2–1
March 14	Tennessee	Plainsman Park • Auburn, AL	L 4–5 (10)	20–2	2–2
March 15	Tennessee	Plainsman Park • Auburn, AL	W 16–4	21–2	3–2
March 16	Tennessee	Plainsman Park • Auburn, AL	W 5–3	22–2	4–2
March 21	Georgia	Plainsman Park • Auburn, AL	W 14–1	23–2	5–2
March 22	Georgia	Plainsman Park • Auburn, AL	W 9–2	24–2	6–2
March 23	Georgia	Plainsman Park • Auburn, AL	W 13–6	25–2	7–2
March 25	at UAB*	Jerry D. Young Memorial Field • Birmingham, AL	W 9–7	26–2	7–2
March 28	at Kentucky	Cliff Hagan Stadium • Lexington, KY	W 5–0 (7)	27–2	8–2
March 29	at Kentucky	Cliff Hagan Stadium • Lexington, KY	L 5–6 (12)	27–3	8–3
March 30	at Kentucky	Cliff Hagan Stadium • Lexington, KY	W 18–3	28–3	9–3

April (11–6)
Date	Opponent	Site/stadium	Score	Overall record	SEC record
April 2	Samford*	Plainsman Park • Auburn, AL	W 9–3	29–3	9–3
April 4	at Florida	Alfred A. McKethan Stadium • Gainesville, FL	L 3–5	29–4	9–4
April 5	at Florida	Alfred A. McKethan Stadium • Gainesville, FL	W 9–4	30–4	10–4
April 6	at Florida	Alfred A. McKethan Stadium • Gainesville, FL	W 15–7	31–4	11–4
April 8	VMI*	Plainsman Park • Auburn, AL	W 14–2	32–4	11–4
April 9	VMI*	Plainsman Park • Auburn, AL	W 17–3	33–4	11–4
April 12	Alabama	Plainsman Park • Auburn, AL	W 13–8	34–4	12–4
April 12	Alabama	Plainsman Park • Auburn, AL	L 7–22	34–5	12–5
April 13	Alabama	Plainsman Park • Auburn, AL	L 11–12 (11)	34–6	12–6
April 15	Mercer*	Plainsman Park • Auburn, AL	W 10–3	35–6	12–6
April 16	UAB*	Plainsman Park • Auburn, AL	W 9–8	36–6	12–6
April 18	Arkansas	Plainsman Park • Auburn, AL	W 11–4	37–6	13–6
April 19	Arkansas	Plainsman Park • Auburn, AL	L 5–9	37–7	13–7
April 20	Arkansas	Plainsman Park • Auburn, AL	W 12–3	38–7	14–7
April 22	Marshall*	Plainsman Park • Auburn, AL	W 11–4 (5)	39–7	14–7
April 25	at LSU	Alex Box Stadium • Baton Rouge, LA	L 1–7	39–8	14–8
April 26	at LSU	Alex Box Stadium • Baton Rouge, LA	L 0–8	39–9	14–9

May (4–3)
Date	Opponent	Site/stadium	Score	Overall record	SEC record
May 3	at Mississippi State	Dudy Noble Field • Starkville, MS	W 12–4	40–9	15–9
May 3	at Mississippi State	Dudy Noble Field • Starkville, MS	W 6–4	41–9	16–9
May 4	at Mississippi State	Dudy Noble Field • Starkville, MS	L 6–8	41–10	16–10
May 6	Columbus State*	Plainsman Park • Auburn, AL	W 9–2	42–10	16–10
May 9	Ole Miss	Plainsman Park • Auburn, AL	L 6–11	42–11	16–11
May 10	Ole Miss	Plainsman Park • Auburn, AL	W 13–6	43–11	17–11
May 11	Ole Miss	Plainsman Park • Auburn, AL	L 5–7 (11)	43–12	17–12

Postseason

SEC Tournament (2–2)
Date	Opponent	Seed	Site/stadium	Score	Overall record	SECT record
May 14	(7) Arkansas	(6)	Golden Park • Columbus, GA	W 7–3	44–12	1–0
May 15	(1) LSU	(6)	Golden Park • Columbus, GA	L 2–5	44–13	1–1
May 16	(5) Mississippi State	(6)	Golden Park • Columbus, GA	W 5–4	45–13	2–1
May 17	(3) Florida	(6)	Golden Park • Columbus, GA	L 5–17	45–14	2–2

NCAA East Regional (4–1)
Date	Opponent	Seed	Site/stadium	Score	Overall record	Reg record
May 22	(5) Western Carolina	(2)	Dick Howser Stadium • Tallahassee, FL	W 11–3	46–14	1–0
May 23	(4) South Florida	(2)	Dick Howser Stadium • Tallahassee, FL	W 9–0	47–14	2–0
May 24	(1) Florida State	(2)	Dick Howser Stadium • Tallahassee, FL	W 8–7	48–14	3–0
May 25	(1) Florida State	(2)	Dick Howser Stadium • Tallahassee, FL	L 7–9	48–15	3–1
May 25	(1) Florida State	(2)	Dick Howser Stadium • Tallahassee, FL	W 5–2	49–15	4–1

College World Series (1–2)
Date	Opponent	Seed	Site/stadium	Score	Overall record	CWS record
May 30	(3) Stanford	(6)	Johnny Rosenblatt Stadium • Omaha, NE	L 3–8	49–16	0–1
June 1	(7) Rice	(6)	Johnny Rosenblatt Stadium • Omaha, NE	W 10–1	50–16	1–1
June 3	(3) Stanford	(6)	Johnny Rosenblatt Stadium • Omaha, NE	L 4–11	50–17	1–2

- Win
- Loss
- (#) Tournament seedings in parentheses.
