= 1997 Mississippi State Bulldogs baseball team =

American college baseball season

1997 Mississippi State Bulldogs baseball

NCAA Mideast Regional champions

College World Series, 1–2
- Conference: Southeastern Conference
- CB: No. 6
- Record: 47–21 (19–11 SEC)
- Head coach: Ron Polk (22nd season)
- Home stadium: Dudy Noble Field

1997 Southeastern Conference baseball standings
	Conf.				Overall
Team	W		L	PCT	W		L	PCT
Eastern
No. 20 Florida ^{x}‍‍‍^{y}	17	–	13	.567	40	–	24	.625
No. 22 Tennessee ^{x}‍‍‍^{y}	17	–	13	.567	42	–	19	.689
Vanderbilt ‍‍‍	14	–	16	.467	31	–	24	.564
South Carolina ‍‍‍	13	–	17	.433	33	–	24	.579
Kentucky ‍‍‍	10	–	20	.333	20	–	34	.370
Georgia ‍‍‍	8	–	22	.267	28	–	27	.509
Western
No. 1 LSU ^{x}‍†‍‍^{y}	22	–	7	.759	57	–	13	.814
No. 2 Alabama ‍‍‡‍^{y}	20	–	9	.690	56	–	14	.800
No. 6 Mississippi State ‍‍‍^{y}	19	–	11	.633	47	–	21	.691
No. 5 Auburn ‍‍‍^{y}	17	–	12	.586	50	–	17	.746
Arkansas ‍‍‍	15	–	14	.517	36	–	20	.643
Ole Miss ‍‍‍	6	–	24	.200	22	–	31	.415
x – Division champion † – Conference champion ‡ – Tournament champion y – Invited to the NCAA tournament As of June 30, 1997; Rankings from Collegiate Baseball

The 1997 Mississippi State Bulldogs baseball team represented Mississippi State University in the 1997 NCAA Division I baseball season. They were led by head coach Ron Polk in his twenty-second season and played their home games at Dudy Noble Field. The Bulldogs were members of the Southeastern Conference, and finished with a record of 47–21, third in the SEC West with a record of 19–11.

Mississippi State was invited to the NCAA Tournament, where they won the Mideast Regional to advance to their sixth College World Series. The Bulldogs tied for fifth, recording a win against UCLA and a pair of losses to eventual runner-up Alabama.

== Personnel ==
=== Roster ===
1997 Mississippi State Bulldogs roster
Pitchers: 15 - Brian Wiese - Sophomore; 16 - Chris Reinike - Sophomore; 17 - Matt Ginter - Freshman; 20 - Barry Walters - Junior; 21 - Kevin Donovan - Freshman; 23 - Van Johnson - Junior; 24 - Keith Dilgard - Senior; 25 - Jeremy Jackson - Sophomore; 28 - Eric DuBose - Junior; 34 - Hank Thoms - Sophomore	Catchers: 4 - Dustin Dabbs - Junior; 8 - Barry Patton - Junior; 33 - Ryan McGrath - Freshman; Outfielders: 2 - Damian Scioneau - Senior; 6 - Brian Terry - Freshman; 7 - Scott Clark - Freshman; 27 - Mark Power - Senior; 29 - Brooks Bryan - Junior; 32 - Rusty Thoms - Junior	Infielders: 3 - Adam Piatt - Junior; 9 - Matt Peeples - Junior; 10 - Richard Lee - Junior; 11 - Rob Hauswald - Junior; 12 - Brad Freeman - Junior; 14 - Travis Chapman - Freshman

=== Coaching staff ===
1997 Mississippi State Bulldogs coaching staff
- 1 - Ron Polk - Head coach - 22nd season
- 26 - Pat McMahon - Associate head coach – 3rd season
- 22 - Tommy Raffo - Assistant coach - 4th season
- 46 - Tim Parenton - Assistant coach - 3rd season

== Schedule ==
Legend
	Mississippi State win
	Mississippi State loss
*	Non-Conference game

1997 Mississippi State Bulldogs baseball game log
Regular season

February
Date	Opponent	Site/stadium	Score	Overall record	SEC record
Feb 17	South Alabama*	Dudy Noble Field • Starkville, MS	L 13–14 ^{(12)}	0–1	
Feb 21	Samford*	Dudy Noble Field • Starkville, MS	W 15–5	1–1	
Feb 22	at South Alabama*	Eddie Stanky Field • Mobile, AL	L 4–5	1–2	
Feb 23	at South Alabama*	Eddie Stanky Field • Mobile, AL	L 1–6	1–3	
Feb 25	Southeast Missouri State*	Dudy Noble Field • Starkville, MS	W 13–3	2–3	
Feb 26	Southeast Missouri State*	Dudy Noble Field • Starkville, MS	W 10–4	3–3	
Feb 27	Delta State*	Dudy Noble Field • Starkville, MS	W 11–4	4–3	

March
Date	Opponent	Site/stadium	Score	Overall record	SEC record
Mar 4	Jackson State*	Dudy Noble Field • Starkville, MS	W 20–0	5–3	
Mar 4	Jackson State*	Dudy Noble Field • Starkville, MS	W 19–1	6–3	
Mar 5	Alcorn State*	Dudy Noble Field • Starkville, MS	W 16–1	7–3	
Mar 7	Florida	Dudy Noble Field • Starkville, MS	L 2–4	7–4	0–1
Mar 8	Florida	Dudy Noble Field • Starkville, MS	L 2–14	7–5	0–2
Mar 9	Florida	Dudy Noble Field • Starkville, MS	L 10–15	7–6	0–4
Mar 11	at Memphis*	Nat Buring Stadium • Memphis, TN	W 14–6	8–6	
Mar 12	at Memphis*	Nat Buring Stadium • Memphis, TN	W 5–4	9–6	
Mar 14	at Kentucky	Cliff Hagan Stadium • Lexington, KY	W 6–5	10–6	1–5
Mar 15	at Kentucky	Cliff Hagan Stadium • Lexington, KY	W 14–4	11–6	2–3
Mar 16	at Kentucky	Cliff Hagan Stadium • Lexington, KY	L 10–14	11–7	2–4
Mar 19	Northeast Louisiana*	Dudy Noble Field • Starkville, MS	W 8–5	12–7	
Mar 19	Northeast Louisiana*	Dudy Noble Field • Starkville, MS	W 7–1	13–7	
Mar 20	William Carey*	Dudy Noble Field • Starkville, MS	W 12–4	14–7	
Mar 21	South Carolina	Dudy Noble Field • Starkville, MS	W 6–3	15–7	3–4
Mar 22	South Carolina	Dudy Noble Field • Starkville, MS	L 5–8 ^{(10)}	15–8	3–5
Mar 23	South Carolina	Dudy Noble Field • Starkville, MS	W 11–8	16–8	4–5
Mar 26	vs Ole Miss*	Smith–Wills Stadium • Jackson, MS (Mayor's Trophy)	W 7–3	17–8	
Mar 28	at Georgia	Foley Field • Athens, GA	W 19–8	18–8	5–5
Mar 29	at Georgia	Foley Field • Athens, GA	W 14–9	19–8	6–5
Mar 30	at Georgia	Foley Field • Athens, GA	W 3–2	20–8	7–5
Mar 31	at Jackson State*	Jackson, MS	W 4–2 ^{(12)}	21–8	

April
Date	Opponent	Site/stadium	Score	Overall record	SEC record
Apr 1	at UAB*	Jerry D. Young Memorial Field • Birmingham, AL	L 3–5	21–9	
Apr 2	at UAB*	Jerry D. Young Memorial Field • Birmingham, AL	L 3–15	21–10	
Apr 4	at Vanderbilt	McGugin Field • Nashville, TN	W 15–5	22–10	8–5
Apr 6	at Vanderbilt	McGugin Field • Nashville, TN	W 25–13	23–10	9–5
Apr 6	at Vanderbilt	McGugin Field • Nashville, TN	L 6–7	23–11	9–6
Apr 8	New Orleans*	Dudy Noble Field • Starkville, MS	W 4–2	24–11	
Apr 9	New Orleans*	Dudy Noble Field • Starkville, MS	W 5–2	25–11	
Apr 12	LSU	Dudy Noble Field • Starkville, MS	W 9–6	26–11	10–6
Apr 12	LSU	Dudy Noble Field • Starkville, MS	L 12–20	26–12	10–7
Apr 13	LSU	Dudy Noble Field • Starkville, MS	W 4–1	27–12	11–7
Apr 16	Belhaven*	Dudy Noble Field • Starkville, MS	W 15–10	28–12	
Apr 17	Mississippi Valley State*	Dudy Noble Field • Starkville, MS	W 23–3	29–12	
Apr 18	Alabama	Dudy Noble Field • Starkville, MS	W 11–10 ^{(11)}	30–12	12–7
Apr 19	Alabama	Dudy Noble Field • Starkville, MS	W 9–7	31–12	13–7
Apr 20	Alabama	Dudy Noble Field • Starkville, MS	L 3–6	31–13	13–8
Apr 22	Southern Miss*	Dudy Noble Field • Starkville, MS	W 16–12	32–13	
Apr 23	Southern Miss*	Dudy Noble Field • Starkville, MS	W 4–2	33–13	
Apr 25	at Ole Miss	Swayze Field • Oxford, MS	W 21–6	34–13	14–8
Apr 26	at Ole Miss	Swayze Field • Oxford, MS	W 5–2	35–13	15–8
Apr 27	at Ole Miss	Swayze Field • Oxford, MS	W 6–2	36–13	16–8
Apr 29	at Southern Miss*	Pete Taylor Park • Hattiesburg, MS	L 4–9	36–14	
Apr 30	at Southern Miss*	Pete Taylor Park • Hattiesburg, MS	W 20–2	37–14	

May
Date	Opponent	Site/stadium	Score	Overall record	SEC record
May 3	Auburn	Dudy Noble Field • Starkville, MS	L 4–12	37–15	16–9
May 3	Auburn	Dudy Noble Field • Starkville, MS	L 4–6	37–16	16–10
May 4	Auburn	Dudy Noble Field • Starkville, MS	W 8–6	38–16	17–10
May 9	at Arkansas	Baum Stadium • Fayetteville, AR	L 5–8	38–17	17–11
May 10	at Arkansas	Baum Stadium • Fayetteville, AR	W 13–5	39–17	18–11
May 11	at Arkansas	Baum Stadium • Fayetteville, AR	W 17–10	40–17	19–11

Postseason

SEC Tournament
Date	Opponent	Seed	Site/stadium	Score	Overall record	SECT record
May 14	(8) South Carolina	(5)	Golden Park • Columbus, GA	W 12–9	41–17	1–0
May 15	(2) Alabama	(5)	Golden Park • Columbus, GA	L 3–16	41–18	1–1
May 16	(6) Auburn	(5)	Golden Park • Columbus, GA	L 4–5	41–19	1–2

NCAA Mideast Regional
Date	Opponent	Seed	Site/stadium	Score	Overall record	Regional record
May 22	(5) Ohio State	(2)	Dudy Noble Field • Starkville, MS	W 8–5	42–19	1–0
May 23	(4) Washington	(2)	Dudy Noble Field • Starkville, MS	L 4–5	42–20	1–1
May 24	(6) Tennessee Tech	(2)	Dudy Noble Field • Starkville, MS	W 25–5	43–20	2–1
May 25	(1) Georgia Tech	(2)	Dudy Noble Field • Starkville, MS	W 10–2	44–20	3–1
May 25	(4) Washington	(2)	Dudy Noble Field • Starkville, MS	W 7–5	45–20	4–1
May 26	(4) Washington	(2)	Dudy Noble Field • Starkville, MS	W 4–3	46–20	5–1

College World Series
Date	Opponent	Seed	Site/stadium	Score	Overall record	CWS record
May 31	(1) Alabama	(8)	Johnny Rosenblatt Stadium • Omaha, NE	L 2–3	46–21	0–1
June 2	(4) UCLA	(8)	Johnny Rosenblatt Stadium • Omaha, NE	W 7–5	47–21	1–1
June 3	(1) Alabama	(8)	Johnny Rosenblatt Stadium • Omaha, NE	L 5–9	47–22	1–2

Tournament seeds in parentheses.
