= Mississippi State Bulldogs baseball statistical leaders =

The Mississippi State Bulldogs baseball statistical leaders are individual statistical leaders of the Mississippi State Bulldogs baseball program in various categories, including batting average, home runs, runs batted in, runs, hits, stolen bases, ERA, and Strikeouts. Within those areas, the lists identify single-game, single-season, and career leaders. The Bulldogs represent the Mississippi State University in the NCAA's Southeastern Conference.

Mississippi State began competing in intercollegiate baseball in 1885. These lists are updated through the end of the 2025 season.

== Batting Average ==
Career (300+ ABs)
Rk	Player	AVG	Seasons
1	Will Clark	.391 (209-534)	1983 1984 1985
2	Mark Gillaspie	.384 (139-362)	1980 1981
3	Rafael Palmeiro	.372 (268-720)	1983 1984 1985
4	Tommy Raffo	.366 (278-760)	1987 1988 1989 1990
5	Dan Paradoa	.361 (159-441)	1986 1987
6	Brian Wiese	.359 (242-674)	1996 1997 1998 1999
7	Mike Kelley	.357 (267-748)	1976 1977 1978 1979
	Travis Chapman	.357 (327-916)	1997 1998 1999 2000
	Jake Mangum	.357 (383-1074)	2016 2017 2018 2019
10	Adam Frazier	.348 (224-643)	2011 2012 2013

Season
Rk	Player	AVG	Season
1	Nat Showalter	.459 (67-146)	1977
2	Will Clark	.420 (94-224)	1985
3	Jackie Parker	.418 (23-55)	1954
4	Rafael Palmeiro	.415 (98-236)	1984
5	Brian Wiese	.412 (103-250)	1998
6	Mark Gillaspie	.411 (85-207)	1981
7	Jake Mangum	.408 (84-206)	2016
8	Rafael Palmeiro	.406 (95-234)	1983
9	Travis Chapman	.404 (99-245)	1999
10	Mike Kelley	.400 (94-235)	1979

== Home Runs ==
Career
Rk	Player	HR	Seasons
1	Hunter Hines	70	2022 2023 2024 2025
2	Rafael Palmeiro	67	1983 1984 1985
3	Will Clark	61	1983 1984 1985
4	Bruce Castoria	58	1979 1980 1981 1982
5	Connor Powers	54	2007 2008 2009 2010
6	Jon Knott	51	1998 1999 2000 2001
7	Tracy Echols	47	1986 1987 1989 1990
8	Richard Lee	46	1995 1996 1997 1998
9	Tommy Raffo	45	1987 1988 1989 1990
	Ace Reese	45	2025 2026

Season
Rk	Player	HR	Season
1	Bruce Castoria	29	1981
	Rafael Palmeiro	29	1984
3	Will Clark	28	1984
4	Will Clark	25	1985
5	Ace Reese	24	2026
6	Brent Rooker	23	2017
7	Tommy Raffo	22	1989
	Hunter Hines	22	2023
9	Ace Reese	21	2025
10	Mark Gillaspie	20	1981
	Rafael Palmeiro	20	1985
	Dakota Jordan	20	2024

Single Game
Rk	Player	HR	Season	Opponent
1	Del Unser	3	1965	Ole Miss
	Del Bender	3	1978	Birmingham-Southern
	Rafael Palmeiro	3	1984	Jackson State
	Dan Paradoa	3	1986	Mississippi College
	Tommy Raffo	3	1990	Delta State
	Brad Jones	3	2004	Southern Miss
	Jason Nappi	3	2008	UAB
	Ryan Duffy	3	2010	Jackson State
	Brent Rooker	3	2017	Kentucky
	Ross Highfill	3	2023	Lipscomb
	Joe Powell	3	2024	North Alabama

== Runs Batted In ==
Career
Rk	Player	RBI	Seasons
1	Richard Lee	265	1995 1996 1997 1998
2	Rafael Palmeiro	239	1983 1984 1985
3	Hunter Hines	221	2022 2023 2024 2025
4	Bruce Castoria	213	1979 1980 1981 1982
5	Tommy Raffo	207	1987 1988 1989 1990
6	Jon Knott	206	1998 1999 2000 2001
	Connor Powers	206	2007 2008 2009 2010
8	Travis Chapman	202	1997 1998 1999 2000
9	Will Clark	199	1983 1984 1985
10	Tracy Echols	182	1986 19871989 1990
	Tanner Allen	182	2018 2019 2020 2021

Season
Rk	Player	RBI	Season
1	Bruce Castoria	98	1981
2	Rafael Palmeiro	94	1984
3	Will Clark	93	1984
4	Richard Lee	90	1997
5	Richard Lee	85	1998
6	Brent Rooker	82	2017
7	Tommy Raffo	80	1989
8	Brad Winkler	79	1983
9	Rafael Palmeiro	78	1983
	Mark Gillaspie	78	1981

Single Game
Rk	Player	RBI	Season	Opponent
1	Jason Nappi	11	2008	UAB

== Runs ==
Career
Rk	Player	R	Seasons
1	Dan Van Cleve	232	1981 1982 1983 1984 1985
2	Jake Mangum	229	2016 2017 2018 2019
3	Burke Masters	227	1987 1988 1989 1990
4	Rafael Palmeiro	224	1983 1984 1985
5	Travis Chapman	221	1997 1998 1999 2000
6	Richard Lee	219	1995 1996 1997 1998
7	Jeffrey Rea	207	2004 2005 2006 2007
8	Brad Winkler	203	1980 1981 1982 1983
9	Matthew Maniscalco	197	2000 2001 2002 2003
10	Brad Freeman	192	1995 1996 1997 1998

Season
Rk	Player	R	Season
1	Rafael Palmeiro	87	1984
2	Mark Gillaspie	81	1981
	Brooks Bryan	81	1997
4	Dan Van Cleve	80	1983
5	Jody Hurst	79	1989
6	Will Clark	75	1985
	Jake Mangum	75	2019
8	Mike Kelley	74	1979
	Dan Van Cleve	74	1985
	Pete Young	74	1989
	Rowdey Jordan	74	2021

Single Game
Rk	Player	R	Season	Opponent
1	Terry Murphy	6	1956	Vanderbilt

== Hits ==
Career
Rk	Player	H	Seasons
1	Jake Mangum	383	2016 2017 2018 2019
2	Jeffrey Rea	335	2004 2005 2006 2007
3	Richard Lee	328	1995 1996 1997 1998
4	Travis Chapman	327	1997 1998 1999 2000
5	Steve Gendron	316	2001 2002 2003 2004
6	Burke Masters	295	1987 1988 1989 1990
7	Tanner Allen	281	2018 2019 2020 2021
8	Matthew Maniscalco	279	2000 2001 2002 2003
9	Tommy Raffo	278	1987 1988 1989 1990
10	Brad Hildreth	275	1986 1987 1988 1989

Season
Rk	Player	H	Season
1	Jake Mangum	108	2019
2	Adam Frazier	107	2013
3	Brian Wiese	103	1998
4	Tommy Raffo	102	1989
5	Jake Mangum	101	2018
6	Richard Lee	100	1997
	Tanner Allen	100	2021
8	Travis Chapman	99	1999
9	Rafael Palmeiro	98	1984
10	Tommy Raffo	97	1990

Single Game
Rk	Player	H	Season	Opponent
1	Terry Murphy	6	1956	Vanderbilt
	Don Bell	6	1966	Arkansas
	Tracy Echols	6	1989	Kentucky
	Burke Masters	6	1990	Florida State
	Adam Frazier	6	2013	Virginia

== Stolen Bases ==
Career
Rk	Player	SB	Seasons
1	Mike Kelley	79	1976 1977 1978 1979
2	Dan Van Cleve	70	1981 1982 1983 1984 1985
3	Brad Winkler	60	1980 1981 1982 1983
4	Jake Mangum	56	2016 2017 2018 2019
5	Dave Klipstein	54	1979 1980 1981 1982
	Grant Hogue	54	2008 2009
7	Pete White	51	1980 1981 1982 1983
8	Matthew Maniscalco	46	2000 2001 2002 2003
	Jacob Robson	46	2013 2014 2015 2016
10	Jeffrey Rea	43	2004 2005 2006 2007

Season
Rk	Player	SB	Season
1	Dan Van Cleve	38	1985
2	Grant Hogue	29	2009
3	Dave Klipstein	28	1981
4	Mike Kelley	27	1979
	David Mershon	27	2024
6	Nick Vickerson	26	2011
7	Mike Kelley	25	1977
	Brad Winkler	25	1981
	Grant Hogue	25	2008
10	Jon Shave	24	1990

Single Game
Rk	Player	SB	Season	Opponent
1	Brad Winkler	4	1981	Arizona
	Derrick Armstrong	4	2014	Michigan State
	David Mershon	4	2024	LSU

== Earned Run Average ==
Career
Rk	Player	ER-IP	ERA	Seasons
1	Jonathan Holder	24-135.2	1.59	2012 2013 2014
2	Landon Sims	16-85.0	1.69	2020 2021 2022
3	Frank Montgomery	32-171.1	1.79	1961 1962 1963
4	Dennis Hall	32-156.1	1.84	1967 1968 1969 1970
5	Mike Proffitt	62-300.1	1.86	1969 1970 1971 1972
6	Brantley Jones	57-257.0	2.00	1967 1968 1969 1970
7	Jon Harden	65-255.2	2.29	1989 1990 1991 1992
8	Claude Passeau	33-129.1	2.30	1964 1965 1966
9	Guy Parker	37-144.1	2.31	1960 1961 1962
10	Pete Young	35-131.2	2.39	1987 1988 1989

Season
Rk	Player	ER/IP	ERA	Season
1	Dennis Hall	4-57.0	0.63	1970
2	Frank Montgomery	7-92.0	0.68	1962
3	Jacob Lindgren	5-55.1	0.81	2014
4	Jim Pruett	6-52.1	1.03	1957
5	Butch Holmes	6-50.1	1.07	1973
6	Bobby Reed	7-57.2	1.09	1988
7	Jamie Gant	7-54.2	1.15	2003
8	Mike Proffitt	9-68.0	1.19	1970
9	Chad Girodo	9-59.2	1.36	2013
10	Mike Proffitt	11-70.0	1.41	1972

== Strikeouts ==
Career
Rk	Player	K	Seasons
1	Eric DuBose	428	1995 1996 1997
2	Brantley Jones	364	1967 1968 1969 1970
3	Ethan Small	318	2016 2018 2019
4	Chris Stratton	279	2010 2011 2012
5	Paul Maholm	273	2001 2002 2003
6	B.J. Wallace	271	1990 1991 1992
7	Matt Ginter	269	1996 1997 1998 1999
8	Mike Proffitt	265	1969 1970 1971 1972
9	Don Robinson	262	1975 1976 1977 1978
10	Carlton Loewer	261	1992 1993 1994

Season
Rk	Player	K	Season
1	Ethan Small	176	2019
2	Eric DuBose	174	1996
3	B.J. Wallace	145	1992
	Eric DuBose	145	1997
5	Gary Rath	141	1994
6	Will Bednar	139	2021
7	Jeff Brantley	136	1985
8	Tomas Valincius	134	2026
9	Chris Stratton	127	2012
10	Ethan Small	122	2018

Single Game
Rk	Player	K	Season	Opponent
1	Willie Mitchell	26	1909	LSU
