= Auburn Tigers baseball statistical leaders =

The Auburn Tigers baseball statistical leaders are individual statistical leaders of the Auburn Tigers baseball program in various categories, including batting average, home runs, runs batted in, runs, hits, stolen bases, ERA, and Strikeouts. Within those areas, the lists identify single-game, single-season, and career leaders. The Tigers represent Auburn University in the NCAA's Southeastern Conference.

Auburn began competing in intercollegiate baseball in 1895. These lists are updated through the end of the 2025 season.

== Batting Average ==
Career
Rk	Player	AVG	Seasons
1	Jimmy Barfield	.385	1963 1964
2	Frank Thomas	.382	1987 1988 1989
3	Tim Hudson	.379	1996 1997
4	Gabe Gross	.375	1999 2000 2001
5	Andy Merchant	.363	1969 1970 1971 1972
6	Jim Pyburn	.360	1953 1954 1955
7	Adam Sullivan	.359	1996 1997
8	Jay Waggoner	.355	1992 1993 1994 1995
9	Frank Fryer	.353	1964 1965 1966
10	Mailon Kent	.352	1998 1999 2000 2001
	Paul Foster	.352	1983 1984 1985 1986

Season
Rk	Player	AVG	Season
1	Paul Foster	.433	1985
2	Jim Pyburn	.432	1954
3	Gabe Gross	.430	2000
4	Todd Faulkner	.423	2000
5	Alan Koch	.419	1959
6	Joey Martin	.417	1971
7	Larry Nichols	.412	1962
8	Jay Waggoner	.409	1994
9	Scott Pratt	.407	1998
10	Andy Merchant	.403	1969

== Home Runs ==
Career
Rk	Player	HR	Seasons
1	Josh Etheredge	59	1995 1996 1997 1998
2	Todd Faulkner	50	1998 1999 2000 2001
3	Brian Fletcher	49	2008 2009 2010
	Frank Thomas	49	1987 1988 1989
5	Hunter Morris	46	2008 2009 2010
6	Cooper McMurray	42	2023 2024 2025
7	Ike Irish	39	2023 2024 2025
8	Trent Mummey	36	2008 2009 2010
9	Steven Williams	36	2018 2019 2020 2021
	Kevin Chabot	36	1993 1994 1995

Season
Rk	Player	HR	Season
1	Bryson Ware	24	2023
2	Hunter Morris	23	2010
3	Sonny DiChiara	22	2022
	Brian Fletcher	22	2010
	Todd Faulkner	22	2000
6	Josh Etheredge	21	1998
	Frank Thomas	21	1987
8	Josh Etheredge	20	1997
	Todd Faulkner	20	1998
	Chase Fralick	20	2026

Single Game
Rk	Player	HR	Season	Opponent
1	several players	3	Most recent: Cole Foster, 2022 vs. Southeastern	

== Runs Batted In ==
Career
Rk	Player	RBI	Seasons
1	Josh Etheredge	269	1995 1996 1997 1998
2	Todd Faulkner	255	1998 1999 2000 2001
3	Casey Dunn	232	1996 1997 1998 1999
4	Gabe Gross	218	1999 2000 2001
5	Frank Thomas	205	1987 1988 1989
6	Jamie Kersh	197	1996 1997 1998 1999
7	Paul Foster	173	1983 1984 1985 1986
8	Brian Fletcher	171	2008 2009 2010
	Kevin Chabot	171	1993 1994 1995
10	Mailon Kent	170	1998 1999 2000 2001
	Chad Wandall	170	1996 1997 1998 1999

Season
Rk	Player	RBI	Season
1	Todd Faulkner	103	2000
2	Tim Hudson	95	1997
3	Josh Etheredge	90	1998
4	Gabe Gross	86	2000
	Casey Dunn	86	1999
6	Frank Thomas	83	1989
7	Josh Etheredge	82	1997
8	Josh Etheredge	78	1996
9	Hunter Morris	76	2010
10	Paul Foster	74	1985

Single Game
Rk	Player	RBI	Season	Opponent
1	Bob Berry	10	1982	Huntingdon

== Runs ==
Career
Rk	Player	R	Seasons
1	Mailon Kent	232	1998 1999 2000 2001
2	Jay Waggoner	208	1992 1993 1994 1995
3	Dominic Rich	207	1998 1999 2000
	Josh Etheredge	207	1995 1996 1997 1998
5	Rock Wilson	201	1984 1985 1986 1987
6	Todd Faulkner	197	1998 1999 2000 2001
	Casey Dunn	197	1996 1997 1998 1999
8	Chad Wandall	194	1996 1997 1998 1999
	Rob Macrory	194	1994 1995 1996 1997
10	Gabe Gross	184	1999 2000 2001

Season
Rk	Player	R	Season
1	Gabe Gross	83	2000
2	Scott Pratt	82	1998
3	Adam Sullivan	81	1997
4	Mailon Kent	80	2000
5	Mailon Kent	79	1999
	Josh Etheredge	79	1997
7	Rob Macrory	77	1997
8	Dominic Rich	72	2000
9	Josh Etheredge	71	1998
	Tim Hudson	71	1997
	Rock Wilson	71	1987

Single Game
Rk	Player	R	Season	Opponent
1	Bryson Ware	6	2021	Alabama A&M

== Hits ==
Career
Rk	Player	H	Seasons
1	Jay Waggoner	341	1992 1993 1994 1995
2	Mailon Kent	309	1998 1999 2000 2001
3	Casey Dunn	307	1996 1997 1998 1999
4	Brandon Moore	304	1991 1992 1993 1994
5	Todd Faulkner	303	1998 1999 2000 2001
6	Chad Wandall	280	1996 1997 1998 1999
7	Javon Moran	267	2001 2002 2003
8	Jamie Kersh	261	1996 1997 1998 1999
9	Gabe Gross	259	1999 2000 2001
10	Rock Wilson	258	1984 1985 1986 1987

Season
Rk	Player	H	Season
1	Jay Waggoner	119	1994
2	Tim Hudson	108	1997
3	Hunter Morris	105	2010
	Todd Faulkner	105	2000
	Scott Pratt	105	1998
6	Adam Sullivan	103	1997
7	Gabe Gross	102	2000
	Casey Dunn	102	1999
	Mailon Kent	102	1999
10	Rob Macrory	99	1997

Single Game
Rk	Player	H	Season	Opponent
1	Tyler Johnstone	6	2005	Elon
	Josh Etheredge	6	1997	S. Carolina
	Andy Merchant	6	1972	Florida

== Stolen Bases ==
Career
Rk	Player	SB	Seasons
1	Mailon Kent	90	1998 1999 2000 2001
2	Curt Cope	79	1973 1974 1975 1976
3	Dom Fucci	69	1976 1977 1978 1979
4	Javon Moran	68	2001 2002 2003
5	Clete Thomas	58	2003 2004 2005
6	Bruce Edwards	57	2004 2005 2006 2007
7	Rob Macrory	55	1994 1995 1996 1997
8	Mickey Miller	52	1973 1974 1975 1976
9	Dominic Rich	47	1998 1999 2000
10	Bristol Carter	45	2025 2026

Season
Rk	Player	SB	Season
1	Mailon Kent	40	1999
2	Scott Pratt	33	1998
3	Bristol Carter	31	2026
4	Jay Gonzalez	30	2012
5	Bruce Edwards	28	2007
	Dom Fucci	28	1978
7	Cooper Weiss	27	2024
	Mailon Kent	27	2000
9	Javon Moran	26	2003
	Rob Macrory	26	1997
	Curt Cope	26	1974
	Rock Wilson	26	1987

Single Game
Rk	Player	SB	Season	Opponent
1	Cooper Weiss	4	2024	EKU
	Cooper Weiss	4	2024	Samford

== Earned Run Average ==
Career
Rk	Player	ERA	Seasons
1	Q.V. Lowe	1.69	1966 1967
2	Joe Overton	1.77	1962 1963
3	Joe Beckwith	1.92	1974 1975 1976 1977
4	Tommy Smith	2.07	1967 1968
5	Monti Sharpe	2.25	1964 1965
6	Keegan Thompson	2.46	2014 2015 2017
	Rick Eisenacher	2.46	1969 1970 1971
8	Jim Blauser	2.52	1966 1967
9	Terry Leach	2.53	1973 1974 1975 1976
10	Cody Greenhill	2.59	2018 2019 2020 2021
	John Powell	2.59	1990 1991 1992 1993 1994

Season
Rk	Player	ERA	Season
1	Paul Susce	0.99	1954
2	George Simmons	1.26	1968
3	Gregg Olson	1.26	1987
4	Terry Leach	1.31	1974
5	Beal Lazenby	1.43	1969
6	Jimmy Crysel	1.46	1964
7	Tom McClendon	1.48	1953
8	Herbie Pearce	1.49	1954
9	Quineth Roberts	1.56	1958
10	Jim Blauser	1.56	1967

== Strikeouts ==
Career
Rk	Player	K	Seasons
1	John Powell	602	1990 1991 1992 1993 1994
2	Ryan Halla	392	1993 1994 1995 1996
3	Brent Schoening	327	1997 1998 1999
4	Casey Mize	324	2016 2017 2018
5	Hayden Gliemmo	290	1998 1999 2000 2001
6	Arnold Hughey	272	2002 2003 2004 2005
7	Gregg Olson	271	1986 1987 1988
8	Chris Bootcheck	270	1998 1999 2000
9	Tim Hudson	255	1996 1997
10	Bryan Hebson	251	1995 1996 1997

Season
Rk	Player	K	Season
1	John Powell	191	1993
2	Tim Hudson	165	1997
3	Casey Mize	156	2018
4	Brent Schoening	151	1999
5	Ryan Halla	148	1995
6	John Powell	130	1994
7	Chris Bootcheck	125	1999
8	Q.V. Lowe	123	1967
9	Bryan Hebson	121	1997
	John Powell	121	1991

Single Game
Rk	Player	K	Season	Opponent
1	Tanner Burns	15	2019	Cincinnati
	Casey Mize	15	2018	Vanderbilt
	Chris Bootcheck	15	1999	W. Virginia
	Tim Hudson	15	1997	Winthrop
	John Powell	15	1994	Ole Miss
	Mark Chapman	15	1986	Clemson
