= 2008 Mississippi State Bulldogs baseball team =

College baseball team

2008 Mississippi State Bulldogs baseball
- Conference: Southeastern Conference
- West
- Record: 23-33 (9-21 SEC)
- Head coach: Ron Polk
- Hitting coach: Tommy Raffo
- Pitching coach: Russ McNickle
- Home stadium: Dudy Noble Field

2008 Southeastern Conference baseball standings
	Conf.				Overall
Team	W		L	PCT	W		L	PCT
Eastern
No. 2 Georgia ^{x}‍†‍‍^{y}	20	–	9	.690	45	–	25	.643
Florida ‍‍‍^{y}	17	–	13	.567	34	–	24	.586
No. 25 Kentucky ‍‍‍^{y}	16	–	14	.533	44	–	19	.698
Vanderbilt ‍‍‍^{y}	15	–	14	.517	41	–	22	.651
South Carolina ‍‍‍^{y}	15	–	15	.500	40	–	23	.635
Tennessee ‍‍‍	12	–	18	.400	27	–	29	.482
Western
No. 6 LSU ^{x}‍‍‡‍^{y}	18	–	11	.621	49	–	19	.721
Alabama ‍‍‍^{y}	16	–	14	.533	35	–	28	.556
Ole Miss ‍‍‍^{y}	15	–	15	.500	39	–	26	.600
Arkansas ‍‍‍^{y}	14	–	15	.483	34	–	24	.586
Auburn ‍‍‍	11	–	19	.367	28	–	28	.500
Mississippi State ‍‍‍	9	–	21	.300	23	–	33	.411
x – Division champion † – Conference champion ‡ – Tournament champion y – Invited to the NCAA tournament As of June 30, 2008; Rankings from Coaches' Poll

The 2008 Mississippi State Bulldogs baseball team represented Mississippi State University in the NCAA Division I baseball season of 2008. The team was coached by Ron Polk, in his 35th year as a collegiate head coach, and his 29th at Mississippi State. During mid-season, Coach Polk announced he would resign effective at the conclusion of the season. Following the conclusion of the season, former MSU standout and University of Kentucky Head Baseball coach John Cohen was announced by incoming AD Greg Bryne as the new Mississippi State Baseball Coach for 2009.

== Pre-season ==
The 2008 version of the Mississippi State Bulldogs Baseball team were looking to build on the success of the 2007 MSU Baseball Campaign after advancing to the College World Series. Based upon the achievements the year before, the recruiting class of 2008 was ranked 26th by Collegiate Baseball The team was predicted to finish second in the SEC West Mississippi State was ranked 24th in the preseason NCBWA poll, 23rd in the USA Today/ESPN Coaches Poll, and 19th in the Rivals.com preseason poll

Infielder Brandon Turner was named to the 2008 preseason Louisville Slugger TPX 2008 All-America second team and to the Golden Spikes Award preseason watch list. Pitcher Aaron Weatherford was named to the preseason watch list for the NCWBA Stopper of the Year Award. Turner and Weatherford were both named to the preseason watch list for the 2008 Brooks Wallace Award.

== Roster and Stats ==
=== Coaches ===
Name	Title	First season at MSU	Alma mater
Ron Polk	Head coach	1976	Grand Canyon College (1965)
Russ McNickle	Assistant coach	2002	University of South Alabama (1988)
Tommy Raffo	Assistant coach	1998	Mississippi State University (1990)
Wade Hedges	Volunteer Assistant Coach	2004	Florida Southern College (1996)

=== Players ===
#	Player	Pos	B	T	YR	Hometown	G	AB	H	AVG	HR	RBI	BB	SB	FLD%
2	Brandon Turner	2B	L	R	SO	Cleveland, TN	8	23	5	.217	1	4	0	0	1.000
3	Grant Hogue	OF	S	R	JR	Hattiesburg, MS	55	197	63	.320	0	13	21	25	.943
5	Russ Sneed	3B/SS	R	R	SO	Senatobia, MS	56	215	59	.274	2	26	31	5	.940
7	Ryan Powers	SS/2B	R	R	FR	Beacon, NY	40	92	22	.239	0	10	12	0	.944
8	Brooks Lewis	C	R	R	JR	Heidelberg, MS	23	17	4	.235	0	2	3	0	.980
11	Tyler Moore	1B	R	R	JR	Brandon, MS	56	204	61	.299	14	46	21	5	.982
13	Jet Butler	SS/2B	S	R	SO	Pensacola, FL	55	181	49	.271	1	24	16	0	.953
14	Ryan Duffy	C	L	R	SO	West Melbourne, FL	42	121	37	.306	7	25	4	0	.980
15	Mark Goforth	OF	L	R	JR	Covington, TN	46	101	31	.307	0	10	12	3	1.000
16	Will Coggin	2B	R	R	JR	Booneville, MS	8	4	0	.000	0	1	1	0	1.000
18	Jason Nappi	OF	R	R	FR	Birmingham, AL	53	197	54	.274	8	37	32	1	.897
19	Andy Rice	OF	L	L	SR	Amory, MS	31	61	16	.262	1	9	8	0	.972
20	Nick Hardy	OF	R	R	JR	Flora, MS.	49	76	20	.263	2	13	14	2	.950
23	Cade Hoggard	OF	R	R	SO	Oxford, MS	20	18	1	.056	0	0	5	0	1.000
25	Connor Powers	3B	R	R	SO	Naperville, IL	35	135	47	.348	11	38	18	2	.915
26	Scott DeLoach	C	R	R	JR	Madison, MS	5	1	1	1.000	0	0	0	0	1.000
27	Jeff Flagg	OF	R	R	JR	Jacksonville, FL	34	50	9	.180	1	6	9	0	1.000
29	Cody Freeman	C	R	R	FR	Collinsville, MS	38	116	36	.310	2	20	15	1	1.000
36	Johnny Allen	C	R	R	JR	Grenada, MS	22	47	12	.255	0	5	4	0	.979
38	Ryan Collins	OF	L	L	FR	Callaway, FL	43	119	41	.345	3	23	26	3	.983
45	Michael Busby	P/SS	R	R	FR	Vicksburg, MS	3	4	3	.750	0	1	0	0	1.000

=== Pitchers ===
#	Player	T	Yr	Hometown	G	GS	IP	W	L	SV	ERA	H	BB	SO	FLD%
4	Forrest Moore	L	FR	Baton Rouge, LA	19	4	45.1	1	2	0	8.14	52	39	46	.900
6	Justin Pigott	L	SR	Picayune, MS	9	9	44.2	2	3	0	5.04	51	16	44	1.000
9	Greg Houston	R	SO	Hoover, AL	14	2	25.2	0	1	0	7.36	44	16	18	1.000
10	Andy Wilson	L	SR	Columbus, GA	16	1	35.0	3	0	0	5.66	40	13	27	.778
12	Tyler Whitney	L	SO	Lakeland, TN	10	5	20.0	0	2	0	10.80	29	19	20	1.000
17	Chad Crosswhite	R	JR	Brandon, MS	19	11	53.1	3	5	0	9.96	82	27	36	.909
24	Jared Koon	R	JR	Tupelo, MS	2	0	1.2	0	0	0	10.80	2	1	0	1.000
30	John Lalor	R	SR	Germantown, TN	21	2	42.1	3	3	1	3.19	38	14	56	1.000
31	Ricky Bowen	R	SO	Jasper, AL	15	13	73.1	3	6	0	7.61	84	41	64	.889
32	Aaron Weatherford	R	JR	Crystal Springs, MS	18	0	31.2	3	1	7	0.85	10	10	62	1.000
34	Jesse Carver	L	SR	Starkville, MS	15	2	33.2	1	1	0	9.09	57	14	27	1.000
35	Jared Wesson	L	JR	Tupelo, MS	7	1	4.2	0	1	0	19.29	7	12	3	--
41	Lee Swindle	R	JR	Eupora, MS	11	4	35.1	2	3	0	6.37	52	14	13	1.000
44	Drew Hollinghead	R	SO	Leakesville, MS	6	2	10.0	1	1	0	6.30	8	9	5	1.000
45	Michael Busby	R	FR	Vicksburg, MS	19	0	37.0	1	4	0	5.84	39	29	30	1.000

These players are on the roster, but did not appear in a game and were redshirted.

#	Player	Pos	B	T	YR	Hometown
28	Shawn Marquardt	P	R	L	FR	Carmel, IN
33	Paxton Pace	P/2B	R	L	FR	Collinsville, MS
42	Brent Brownlee	OF	R	R	FR	Oxford, MS
48	Luke Adkins	OF	L	L	JR	Nettleton, MS
49	Sean Johnson	OF	R	R	JR	Senatobia, MS
50	Ryan Rubino	SS/2B	R	R	FR	Bradenton, FL
51	Bobby Triglia	3B/C	R	R	FR	Jacksonville, FL

== Schedule and results ==
2008 Game Log
Regular Season

#	Date	Opponent	Score	Site/stadium	Win	Loss	Save	Attendance	Record	SEC
1	February 22	at North Florida	8-2	Baseball Grounds of Jacksonville	Pigott (1-0)	Pryor	---	1191	1-0	
2	February 23	at North Florida	9-17	Harmon Stadium	Raiford	Wesson (0-1)	Stohr	1121	1-1	
3	February 24	at North Florida	6-11	Harmon Stadium	Pryor	Bowen (0-1)	---	1048	1-2	
4	February 26	UAB	9-2	Dudy Noble Field	F. Moore (1-0)	Crawford	Weatherford (1)	5810	2-2	
5	March 1	Air Force	3-1	Dudy Noble Field	Pigott (2-0)	Truesdale	Weatherford (2)	6866	3-2	
6	March 1	Air Force	4-6	Dudy Noble Field	Pingel	Crosswhite (0-1)	Petro	6866	3-3	
7	March 2	Air Force	16-8	Dudy Noble Field	Bowen (1-1)	Petro	---	6438	4-3	
8	March 4	Arkansas-Little Rock	5-9	Dudy Noble Field	Klumpp	F. Moore (1-1)	---	5657	4-4	
9	March 5	Arkansas-Little Rock	6-3	Dudy Noble Field	Carver (1-0)	Rominger	Lalor (1)	5851	5-4	
10	March 9	Baylor	4-5	Dudy Noble Field	Volz	Pigott (2-1)	Fritsch	6021	5-5	
11	March 9	Baylor	11-16	Dudy Noble Field	Tolleson	Crosswhite (0-2)	---	6021	5-6	
12	March 10	Baylor	3-6	Dudy Noble Field	Kempf	Bowen (1-2)	Cassavechia	5622	5-7	
13	March 11	Mississippi Valley State	15-0	Dudy Noble Field	Swindle (1-0)	Reid	---	5725	6-7	
14	March 12	Mississippi Valley State	11-5	Dudy Noble Field	Wilson (1-0)	Gafford	---	5725	7-7	
15	March 14	Ole Miss	6-15	Dudy Noble Field	Lynn	F. Moore (1-2)	Morgan	6571	7-8	0-1
16	March 15	Ole Miss	6-11	Dudy Noble Field	Bittle	Lalor (0-1)	---	7482	7-9	0-2
17	March 16	Ole Miss	4-0	Dudy Noble Field	Bowen (2-2)	Baker	---	3025	8-9	1-2
18	March 18	at UAB	24-10	Young Memorial Field	Swindle (2-0)	Huddleston	---	575	9-9	
19	March 21	at South Carolina	1-9	Sarge Frye Field	Cisco	Carver (1-1)	---	4810	9-10	1-3
20	March 22	at South Carolina	1-4	Sarge Frye Field	Atwood	Swindle (2-1)	Todd	5029	9-11	1-4
21	March 23	at South Carolina	3-10	Sarge Frye Field	Cooper	Bowen (2-3)		4313	9-12	1-5
22	March 25	South Alabama	5-6	Dudy Noble Field	LaGrow	Houston (0-1)	G.Johnson	5866	9-13	
23	March 26	South Alabama	7-6(11)	Dudy Noble Field	Crosswhite (1-2)	Dunning		6037	10-13	
24	March 28	Georgia	3-2(10)	Dudy Noble Field	Crosswhite (2-2)	Fields		7564	11-13	2-5
25	March 29	Georgia	1-5	Dudy Noble Field	Dodson	Swindle (2-2)		9424	11-14	2-6
26	March 30	Georgia	3-5(10)	Dudy Noble Field	McRee	Lalor (0-2)	Fields	6426	11-15	2-7
27	April 1	Austin Peay	13-4	Dudy Noble Field	Wilson (2-0)	Brisbin		5817	12-15	
28	April 2	Austin Peay	10-2	Dudy Noble Field	Holinghead (1-0)	Kole		5862	13-15	
29	April 4	at Kentucky	6-5	Cliff Hagan Stadium	Lalor (1-2)	Baber	Weatherford (3)		14-15	3-7
30	April 5	at Kentucky	4-13	Cliff Hagan Stadium	Green	Swindle (2-3)		2772	14-16	3-8
31	April 6	at Kentucky	8-9	Cliff Hagan Stadium	Paxton	Busby (0-1)		2696	14-17	3-9
32	April 8	at Memphis	8-9(10)	AutoZone Park	Martin	Busby (0-2)		729	14-18	
33	April 11	Vanderbilt	8-15	Dudy Noble Field	Minor	Busby (0-3)		6330	14-19	3-10
34	April 12	Vanderbilt	0-16	Dudy Noble Field	Cotham	Bowen (2-4)		6165	14-20	3-11
35	April 13	Vanderbilt	3-4	Dudy Noble Field	Christiani	Lalor (1-3)	Brewer	5827	14-21	3-12
36	April 15	vs. Ole Miss	6-5	Trustmark Park	Weatherford (1-0)	Baker		7862	15-21	
37	April 19	at Alabama	7-21	Sewell-Thomas Stadium	Hyatt	Crosswhite (2-3)			15-22	3-13
38	April 19	at Alabama	6-4	Sewell-Thomas Stadium	Lalor (2-3)	Quigley	Weatherford (4)	5215	16-22	4-13
39	April 20	at Alabama	3-4	Sewell-Thomas Stadium	Graham	Busby (0-4)		4201	16-23	4-14
40	April 22	at Southern Miss	7-11	Pete Taylor Park	Johnston	Whitney (0-1)	Weathers	4525	16-24	
41	April 23	at Southern Miss	7-12	Pete Taylor Park	Ballinger	Hollinghead (1-1)		4464	16-25	
42	April 25	Tennessee	4-3(12)	Dudy Noble Field	Weatherford (2-0)	Rosas		6170	17-25	5-14
43	April 26	Tennessee	9-12	Dudy Noble Field	Morgado	Bowen (2-5)		6174	17-26	5-15
44	April 27	Tennessee	7-3(8)	Dudy Noble Field	Lalor(3-3)	Harris	6027		18-26	6-15
45	May 2	at Auburn	4-11	Samford Stadium	Dayton	Crosswhite (2-4)		2115	18-27	6-16
46	May 3	at Auburn	4-3	Samford Stadium	Bowen (3-5)	Thompson	Weatherford(5)	2523	19-27	7-16
47	May 4	at Auburn	2-12	Samford Stadium	Greinke	Pigott (2-2)	Woodall	2306	19-28	7-17
48	May 6	at MTSU	5-20	Reese Smith Field	Alvis	Whitney (0-2)	Hyde	921	19-29	
49	May 7	at MTSU	4-3	Reese Smith Field	Busby(1-4)	Francescon	Weatherford(6)	713	20-29	
50	May 9	at LSU	6-15	Alex Box Stadium	Coleman		Crosswhite(2-5)	8548	20-30	7-18
51	May 10	at LSU	4-16	Alex Box Stadium	B. Martin	Bowen(3-6)		8312	20-31	7-19
52	May 11	at LSU	6-9	Alex Box Stadium	Bradford	Pigott (2-3)	Bradshaw	8701	20-32	7-20
53	May 13	Memphis	4-1	Dudy Noble Field	Crosswhite (3-5)	Martin	Weatherford (7)	5731	21-32	
54	May 15	Arkansas	6-5	Dudy Noble Field	Weatherford(3-0)	Wells		5865	22-32	8-20
55	May 16	Arkansas	6-5	Dudy Noble Field	Wilson (3-0)	Bolsinger		6177	23-32	9-20
56	May 17	Arkansas	10-15	Dudy Noble Field	Mahler	Weatherford(3-1)		6738	23-33	9-21
