= 1997 NCAA Division I baseball rankings =

1997 NCAA Division I baseball season

Tournament

College World Series
- Champions: LSU
- Runners-up: Alabama
- MOP: Brandon Larson (LSU)

Seasons
- ← 1996 1998 →

The following polls make up the 1997 NCAA Division I baseball rankings. USA Today and ESPN began publishing the Coaches' Poll of 31 active coaches ranking the top 25 teams in the nation in 1992. Each coach is a member of the American Baseball Coaches Association. Baseball America began publishing its poll of the top 20 teams in college baseball in 1981. Beginning with the 1985 season, it expanded to the top 25. Collegiate Baseball Newspaper published its first human poll of the top 20 teams in college baseball in 1957, and expanded to rank the top 30 teams in 1961.

== USA Today/ESPN Coaches' Poll ==
Currently, only the final poll from the 1997 season is available.

Rank	Team
1	LSU
2	Alabama
3	Miami (FL)
4	Stanford
5	Auburn
6	Mississippi State
7	UCLA
8	Rice
9	Florida State
10	Southern California
11	Georgia Tech
12	Oklahoma State
13	Arizona State
14	Texas Tech
15	Washington
16	South Alabama
17	Wichita State
18	Florida
19	Tennessee
20	NC State
21	Oklahoma
22	Texas A&M
23	Fresno State
24	Clemson
25	Long Beach State

== Baseball America ==
Currently, only the final poll from the 1997 season is available.

Rank	Team
1	LSU
2	Alabama
3	Miami (FL)
4	Stanford
5	UCLA
6	Auburn
7	Mississippi State
8	Rice
9	Florida State
10	Southern California
11	Arizona State
12	Texas Tech
13	Washington
14	Oklahoma State
15	South Alabama
16	Florida
17	Georgia Tech
18	Long Beach State
19	Oklahoma
20	Southwestern Louisiana
21	NC State
22	Santa Clara
23	Fresno State
24	Cal State Fullerton
25	Tennessee

== Collegiate Baseball ==
Currently, only the final poll from the 1997 season is available.

Rank	Team
1	LSU
2	Alabama
3	Miami (FL)
4	Stanford
5	Auburn
6	Mississippi State
7	Rice
8	UCLA
9	Florida State
10	Georgia Tech
11	Texas Tech
12	Oklahoma State
13	Southern California
14	Arizona State
15	Washington
16	South Alabama
17	Oklahoma
18	Fresno State
19	Santa Clara
20	Florida
21	Cal State Fullerton
22	Tennessee
23	NC State
24	Long Beach State
25	Wichita State
26	Texas A&M
27	Harvard
28	UNC Greensboro
29	Southwestern Louisiana
30	Ohio State
