= 1997 Rice Owls baseball team =

Baseball team season

1997 Rice Owls baseball

NCAA Central Regional champion WAC Tournament champion WAC South Champion

College World Series, 0–2
- Conference: Western Athletic Conference
- CB: No. 77
- Record: 47–16 (20–9 WAC)
- Head coach: Wayne Graham
- Home stadium: Cameron Field

1997 Western Athletic Conference baseball standings
	Conf.				Overall
Team	W		L	PCT	W		L	PCT
North
Utah ^{x}‍‍‍	22	–	8	.733	36	–	21	.632
BYU ‍‍‍	21	–	9	.700	37	–	18	.673
Air Force ‍‍‍	6	–	24	.200	13	–	37	.260
Grand Canyon ‍‍‍	5	–	25	.167	13	–	43	.232
South
No. 7 Rice ^{x}‍‍‡‍^{y}	20	–	9	.690	47	–	16	.746
TCU ‍‍‍	15	–	15	.500	26	–	27	.491
UNLV ‍‍‍	10	–	19	.345	24	–	31	.436
New Mexico ‍‍‍	10	–	20	.333	25	–	32	.439
West
San Jose State ^{x}‍‍‍	20	–	10	.667	38	–	21	.644
No. 18 Fresno State ‍‍‍^{y}	19	–	11	.633	40	–	28	.588
San Diego State ‍‍‍	17	–	13	.567	41	–	22	.651
Hawaii ‍‍‍	14	–	16	.467	22	–	34	.393
x – Division champion ‡ – Tournament champion y – Invited to the NCAA tournament As of June 30, 1997; Rankings from Collegiate Baseball

The 1997 Rice Owls baseball team represented Rice University in college baseball in the 1997 NCAA Division I baseball season. They were led by head coach Wayne Graham in his sixth season, and competed in the Western Athletic Conference. This was Rice's first season in the WAC, as the Southwest Conference dissolved after the 1996 season. The Owls finished with a record of 47–16, claiming the WAC South Division with a record of 20–9.

Rice won the WAC Tournament and earned an automatic bid to the NCAA Tournament, their third straight regional. The Owls won the regional in four games to advance to their first 1997 College World Series. Rice finished tied for seventh in Omaha, with losses to eventual champion LSU and fifth place Auburn.

== Personnel ==
=== Roster ===
1997 Rice Owls roster
Pitchers: 10 - Mario Ramos - Freshman; 14 - Matt Anderson - Junior; 16 - Adam Herndon - Senior; 22 - Stephen Bess - Sophomore; 23 - Kevin Joseph - Junior; 30 - Jesse Kurtz-Nicholl - Sophomore; 31 - Jeff Nichols - Freshman; 34 - Peter Terrana - Sophomore; 35 - Marcus Gwyn - Freshman	Catchers: 4 - Hunter Brown - Freshman; 8 - Justin Berg - Sophomore; 15 - Tim McLaughlin - Senior; 29 - Rob Kligman - Senior; Outfielders: 9 - Bubba Crosby - Sophomore; 21 - Will Ford - Sophomore; 32 - Charles Williams - Freshman; 36 - Matt Lorenz - Senior	Infielders: 3 - J. J. Savarino - Freshman; 5 - Jason Richards - Junior; 6 - Jeremy Bates - Freshman; 7 - Joseph Cathey - Senior; 11 - Ryan Matthews - Freshman; 20 - Jacob Baker - Sophomore; 27 - Lance Berkman - Junior; 40 - Bobby Muraro - Freshman

=== Coaching staff ===
1997 Rice Owls coaching staff
- 37 - Wayne Graham - Head coach - 6th season
- 28 - Jon Prather - Assistant coach - 5th season
- 18 - Chris Feris - Assistant coach - 4th season

== Schedule ==
Legend
	Rice win
	Rice loss
*	Non-Conference game

1997 Rice Owls baseball game log
Regular season

February
Date	Opponent	Site/stadium	Score	Overall record	WAC record
Feb 5	Southwest Texas State*	Cameron Field • Houston, TX	W 7–5	1–0	
Feb 5	Southwest Texas State*	Cameron Field • Houston, TX	W 15–14	2–0	
Feb 8	Houston*	Cameron Field • Houston, TX (Silver Glove Series)	L 12–16	2–1	
Feb 9	Houston*	Cameron Field • Houston, TX (Silver Glove Series)	W 11–8	3–1	
Feb 11	at Southwest Texas State*	Bobcat Field • San Marcos, TX	W 10–9	4–1	
Feb 11	at Southwest Texas State*	Bobcat Field • San Marcos, TX	L 6–9	4–2	
Feb 14	McNeese State*	Cameron Field • Houston, TX (Rice Invitational)	W 35–4	5–2	
Feb 15	Nevada*	Cameron Field • Houston, TX (Rice Invitational)	W 11–9	6–2	
Feb 16	Southwest Missouri State*	Cameron Field • Houston, TX (Rice Invitational)	W 7–6	7–2	
Feb 21	Cincinnati*	Cameron Field • Houston, TX (Rice Classic)	W 37–9	8–2	
Feb 22	Oklahoma State*	Cameron Field • Houston, TX (Rice Classic)	W 25–6	9–2	
Feb 23	Northwestern State*	Cameron Field • Houston, TX (Rice Classic)	W 14–0	10–2	
Feb 24	Sam Houston State*	Cameron Field • Houston, TX	W 6–3	11–2	
Feb 28	TCU	Cameron Field • Houston, TX	W 11–6	12–2	1–0

March
Date	Opponent	Site/stadium	Score	Overall record	WAC record
Mar 1	TCU	Cameron Field • Houston, TX	W 5–4	13–2	2–0
Mar 2	TCU	Cameron Field • Houston, TX	W 14–9	14–2	3–0
Mar 4	Texas A&M*	Cameron Field • Houston, TX	L 1–2	14–3	
Mar 5	at Baylor*	Ferrell Field • Waco, TX	L 2–3 ^{(11)}	14–4	
Mar 7	Air Force	Cameron Field • Houston, TX	W 18–3	15–4	4–0
Mar 8	Air Force	Cameron Field • Houston, TX	W 14–1	16–4	5–0
Mar 9	Air Force	Cameron Field • Houston, TX	W 14–6	17–4	6–0
Mar 14	at UNLV	Earl Wilson Stadium • Paradise, NV	L 0–1 ^{(11)}	17–5	6–1
Mar 15	at UNLV	Earl Wilson Stadium • Paradise, NV	W 20–12	18–5	7–1
Mar 16	at UNLV	Earl Wilson Stadium • Paradise, NV	L 8–15	18–6	7–2
Mar 21	at New Mexico	Lobo Field • Albuquerque, NM	L 9–11	18–7	7–3
Mar 22	at New Mexico	Lobo Field • Albuquerque, NM	W 6–4 ^{(8)}	19–7	8–3
Mar 22	at New Mexico	Lobo Field • Albuquerque, NM	W 10–9	20–7	9–3
Mar 26	at Lamar*	Vincent–Beck Stadium • Beaumont, TX	L 1–6	20–8	
Mar 27	San Jose State	Cameron Field • Houston, TX	W 8–0	21–8	10–3
Mar 28	San Jose State	Cameron Field • Houston, TX	W 4–3	22–8	11–3
Mar 29	San Jose State	Cameron Field • Houston, TX	L 8–15	22–9	11–4

April
Date	Opponent	Site/stadium	Score	Overall record	WAC record
Apr 1	Houston*	Cameron Field • Houston, TX (Silver Glove Series)	W 8–5	23–9	
Apr 1	UTSA*	Cameron Field • Houston, TX	W 7–3	24–9	
Apr 4	at Fresno State	Pete Beiden Field • Fresno, CA	L 1–2	24–10	11–5
Apr 5	at Fresno State	Pete Beiden Field • Fresno, CA	L 3–6	24–11	11–6
Apr 6	at Fresno State	Pete Beiden Field • Fresno, CA	L 1–2	24–12	11–7
Apr 8	at Houston*	Schroeder Park • Houston, TX (Silver Glove Series)	W 6–5	25–12	
Apr 9	at Sam Houston State*	Holleman Field • Huntsville, TX	W 4–3	26–12	
Apr 12	at TCU	TCU Diamond • Fort Worth, TX	L 5–10	26–13	11–8
Apr 13	at TCU	TCU Diamond • Fort Worth, TX	W 11–7	27–13	12–8
Apr 13	at TCU	TCU Diamond • Fort Worth, TX	W 6–4	28–13	13–8
Apr 15	Baylor*	Cameron Field • Houston, TX	W 8–4	29–13	
Apr 16	at McNeese State*	Joe Miller Ballpark • Lake Charles, LA	W 9–0	30–13	
Apr 18	New Mexico	Cameron Field • Houston, TX	W 4–1	31–13	14–8
Apr 20	New Mexico	Cameron Field • Houston, TX	W 10–5	32–13	15–8
Apr 20	New Mexico	Cameron Field • Houston, TX	W 3–1	33–13	16–8
Apr 21	at Houston*	Schroeder Park • Houston, TX (Silver Glove Series)	W 8–5	35–13	
Apr 26	UNLV	Cameron Field • Houston, TX	W 12–2	36–13	17–8
Apr 26	UNLV	Cameron Field • Houston, TX	W 13–0	36–13	18–8

May
Date	Opponent	Site/stadium	Score	Overall record	WAC record
May 7	at Lamar*	Vincent–Beck Stadium • Beaumont, TX	W 6–5 ^{(12)}	37–13	
May 9	at Grand Canyon	Brazell Field • Phoenix, AZ	W 18–12	38–13	19–8
May 10	at Grand Canyon	Brazell Field • Phoenix, AZ	W 12–4	39–13	20–8
May 11	at Grand Canyon	Brazell Field • Phoenix, AZ	L 11–14	39–14	20–9

Postseason

WAC Tournament
Date	Opponent	Seed	Site/stadium	Score	Overall record	WACT record
May 14	(2) BYU	(3)	Tony Gwynn Stadium • San Diego, CA	W 16–3	40–14	1–0
May 15	(1) Utah	(3)	Tony Gwynn Stadium • San Diego, CA	W 5–4	41–14	2–0
May 16	(6) San Diego State	(3)	Tony Gwynn Stadium • San Diego, CA	W 7–5	42–14	3–0
May 17	(6) San Diego State	(3)	Tony Gwynn Stadium • San Diego, CA	W 11–1	43–14	4–0

NCAA Central Regional
Date	Opponent	Seed	Site/stadium	Score	Overall record	Regional record
May 22	(5) Southwest Missouri State	(2)	Dan Law Field • Lubbock, TX	W 5–2	44–14	1–0
May 23	(3) Clemson	(2)	Dan Law Field • Lubbock, TX	W 10–6	45–14	2–0
May 24	(6) Southwest Texas State	(2)	Dan Law Field • Lubbock, TX	W 13–9	46–14	3–0
May 25	(5) Southwest Missouri State	(2)	Dan Law Field • Lubbock, TX	W 25–6	47–14	4–0

College World Series
Date	Opponent	Seed	Site/stadium	Score	Overall record	CWS record
May 30	LSU	(7)	Johnny Rosenblatt Stadium • Omaha, NE	L 4–5	47–15	0–1
June 1	Auburn	(7)	Johnny Rosenblatt Stadium • Omaha, NE	L 1–10	47–16	0–2

Tournament seeds in parentheses.
