= 1997 Southeastern Conference baseball tournament =

- Teams: 8
- Format: Play-in round followed by six-team double elimination
- Finals site: Golden Park; Columbus, Georgia
- Champions: Alabama (4th title)
- Winning coach: Jim Wells (3rd title)
- MVP: David Tidwell (Alabama)
- Attendance: 42,000

The 1997 Southeastern Conference baseball tournament was the 1997 postseason baseball championship of the NCAA Division I Southeastern Conference, held at Golden Park in Columbus, Georgia, from May 14 through 18. Alabama defeated LSU in the championship game, earning the conference's automatic bid to the 1997 NCAA Division I baseball tournament.

== Format ==
Eight teams qualified for the league tournament. The teams seeded fifth through eighth played a single-elimination play-in round. The two winners of the play-in games advanced to the main bracket, which was a six-team, double-elimination format, the same as the NCAA regional format used through 1998.

== Regular season results ==
Eastern Division
Team	W	L	Pct	GB	Seed
Florida	17	13	.567	--	3
Tennessee	17	13	.567	--	4
Vanderbilt	14	16	.467	3	--†
South Carolina	13	17	.433	4	8
Kentucky	10	20	.333	7	--
Georgia	8	22	.267	9	--

Western Division
Team	W	L	Pct	GB	Seed
LSU	22	7	.759	--	1
Alabama	20	9	.690	2	2
Mississippi State	19	11	.633	3.5	5
Auburn	17	12	.586	5	6
Arkansas	15	14	.517	7	7
Ole Miss	6	24	.200	16.5	--

†- Vanderbilt forfeited its conference games and tournament berth for using an ineligible player.

== Tournament ==
=== Play-in games ===
Play-in game
6	Auburn	7
7	Arkansas	3

Play-in game
5	Mississippi State	12
8	South Carolina	9

=== Main bracket ===
First round
1	LSU	5
6	Auburn	2
2	Alabama	16
5	Mississippi State	3
3	Florida	7
4	Tennessee	6

Second round
1	LSU	12
4	Tennessee	5
2	Alabama	13
3	Florida	6
6	Auburn	5
5	Mississippi State	4

Third round
1	LSU	12
2	Alabama	7
3	Florida	17
6	Auburn	5

Semifinals
2	Alabama	6
3	Florida	3

Final
1	LSU	2	--
2	Alabama	12	--

== All-tournament team ==
Position	Player	School
1B	Robbie Tucker	Alabama
2B	Blair Barbier	LSU
3B	Andy Phillips	Alabama
SS	Brandon Larson	LSU
C	Matt Frick	Alabama
OF	David Tidwell	Alabama
OF	Dustan Mohr	Alabama
OF	Danny Higgins	LSU
DH	Brad Wilkerson	Florida
P	Jared Kingrey	Alabama
P	Kevin Knorst	Alabama
MVP	David Tidwell	Alabama

== See also ==
- College World Series
- NCAA Division I Baseball Championship
- Southeastern Conference baseball tournament
