= 1997 NCAA Division I baseball tournament =

- Season: 1997
- Teams: 48
- Finals site: Johnny Rosenblatt Stadium; Omaha, NE
- Champions: LSU (4th title)
- Runner-up: Alabama (4th CWS Appearance)
- Winning coach: Skip Bertman (4th title)
- MOP: Brandon Larson (LSU)

The 1997 NCAA Division I baseball tournament was played at the end of the 1997 NCAA Division I baseball season to determine the national champion of college baseball. The tournament concluded with eight teams competing in the College World Series, a double-elimination tournament in its fifty first year. Eight regional competitions were held to determine the participants in the final event. Each region was composed of six teams, resulting in 48 teams participating in the tournament at the conclusion of their regular season, and in some cases, after a conference tournament; Ivy League champion Harvard played Patriot League champion Army in a play-in series that went the full three games to determine who would play in the NCAA tournament. The fifty-first tournament's champion was LSU, coached by Skip Bertman. The Most Outstanding Player was Brandon Larson of LSU.

== Regionals ==
The opening rounds of the tournament were played across eight regional sites across the country, each consisting of a six-team field. Each regional tournament is double-elimination, however region brackets are variable depending on the number of teams remaining after each round. The winners of each regional advanced to the College World Series.

Bold indicates winner.

=== Atlantic Regional ===
Hosted by Miami (FL) at Mark Light Field in Coral Gables, Florida.

First round
1	**Miami (FL)**	**11**
6	Richmond	4
2	**Florida**	**4**
5	St. John's	3
3	**Arizona State**	**10**
4	FIU	2

Second round
1	**Miami (FL)**	**5**
4	FIU	2
2	Florida	2
3	**Arizona State**	**3**
6	**Richmond**	**10**
5	St. John's	4

Third round
1	Miami (FL)	3
3	**Arizona State**	**10**
2	**Florida**	**16**
6	Richmond	2

Semifinals
1	**Miami (FL)**	**6**^{11}
2	Florida	5

Final
3	Arizona State	6	5
1	**Miami (FL)**	**7**	**6**

=== Central Regional ===
Hosted by Texas Tech at Dan Law Field in Lubbock, Texas.

First round
1	Texas Tech	6
6	**Southwest Texas State**	**7**^{11}
2	**Rice**	**5**
5	Southwest Missouri State	2
3	**Clemson**	**13**
4	Nevada	9

Second round
6	Southwest Texas State	1
4	**Nevada**	**7**
1	Texas Tech	2
5	**Southwest Missouri State**	**4**
2	**Rice**	**10**
3	Clemson	6
6	**Southwest Texas State**	**12**
3	Clemson	7

Third round
4	Nevada	9
5	**Southwest Missouri State**	**10**
2	**Rice**	**13**
6	Southwest Texas State	9

Final
5	Southwest Missouri State	6	—
2	**Rice**	**25**	—

=== East Regional ===
Hosted by Florida State at Dick Howser Stadium in Tallahassee, Florida.

First round
1	**Florida State**	**4**
6	Marist	2
2	**Auburn**	**11**
5	Western Carolina	3
3	UCF	4
4	**South Florida**	**5**

Second round
1	**Florida State**	**16**
3	UCF	2
2	**Auburn**	**9**
4	South Florida	0
6	Marist	3
5	**Western Carolina**	**8**

Third round
1	Florida State	7
2	**Auburn**	**8**
4	**South Florida**	**9**
5	Western Carolina	4

Semifinals
1	**Florida State**	**6**
4	South Florida	5

Final
2	**Auburn**	7	**5**
1	Florida State	**9**	2

=== Mideast Regional ===
Hosted by Mississippi State at Dudy Noble Field in Starkville, Mississippi.

First round
1	**Georgia Tech**	**5**
6	Tennessee Tech	0
2	**Mississippi State**	**8**
5	Ohio State	5
3	Southwestern Louisiana	4
4	**Washington**	**5**

Second round
1	**Georgia Tech**	**8**
3	Southwestern Louisiana	0
2	Mississippi State	4
4	**Washington**	**5**
6	**Tennessee Tech**	**5**
5	Ohio State	3

Third round
1	Georgia Tech	4
4	**Washington**	**8**
2	**Mississippi State**	**25**
6	Tennessee Tech	5

Semifinals
1	Georgia Tech	2
2	**Mississippi State**	**10**

Final
4	Washington	5	3
2	**Mississippi State**	**7**	**4**

=== Midwest Regional ===
Hosted by Oklahoma State at Allie P. Reynolds Stadium in Stillwater, Oklahoma.

First round
1	UCLA	2
6	**Harvard**	**7**
2	**Tennessee**	**5**
5	Ohio	2
3	**Oklahoma State**	**8**
4	Stetson	1

Second round
6	**Harvard**	**8**
4	Stetson	6
2	Tennessee	1
3	**Oklahoma State**	**6**
1	**UCLA**	**15**
5	Ohio	1

Third round
6	Harvard	7
3	**Oklahoma State**	**10**
2	Tennessee	3
1	**UCLA**	**5**

Semifinals
6	Harvard	9
1	**UCLA**	**14**

Final
3	Oklahoma State	2	2
1	**UCLA**	**14**	**22**

=== South I Regional ===
Hosted by Louisiana State at Alex Box Stadium in Baton Rouge, Louisiana.

First round
1	**LSU**	**14**
6	UNC Greensboro	0
2	**South Alabama**	**12**
5	Houston	6
3	Oklahoma	0
4	**Long Beach State**	**1**

Second round
1	**LSU**	**14**
3	Oklahoma	3
2	**South Alabama**	**12**
4	Long Beach State	4
6	**UNC Greensboro**	**9**
5	Houston	5

Third round
1	LSU	5
2	**South Alabama**	**11**
4	**Long Beach State**	**14**
6	UNC Greensboro	4

Semifinals
1	**LSU**	**14**^{11}
4	Long Beach State	7

Final
2	South Alabama	4	4
1	**LSU**	**14**	**15**

=== South II Regional ===
Hosted by Alabama at Sewell–Thomas Stadium in Tuscaloosa, Alabama.

First round
1	**Alabama**	**8**
6	Troy State	5
2	Southern California	2
5	**Virginia Tech**	**3**
3	**NC State**	**10**^{10}
4	Wichita State	9

Second round
1	**Alabama**	**6**
4	Wichita State	2
5	Virginia Tech	6
3	**NC State**	**12**
6	Troy State	2
2	**Southern California**	**5**

Third round
1	**Alabama**	**6**
3	NC State	3
5	Virginia Tech	2
2	**Southern California**	**6**

Semifinals
3	NC State	4
2	**Southern California**	**13**

Final
1	**Alabama**	**9**^{10}	—
2	Southern California	8	—

=== West Regional ===
Hosted by Stanford at Sunken Diamond in Stanford, California.

First round
1	**Stanford**	**12**
6	Northeastern	3
2	Cal State Fullerton	0
5	**Santa Clara**	**5**
3	Texas A&M	1
4	**Fresno State**	**2**

Second round
1	**Stanford**	**3**
3	Texas A&M	1
5	**Santa Clara**	**8**
4	Fresno State	1
6	Northeastern	4
2	**Cal State Fullerton**	**8**

Third round
1	**Stanford**	**9**
5	Santa Clara	2
4	**Fresno State**	**8**
2	Cal State Fullerton	7

Semifinals
5	Santa Clara	7
4	**Fresno State**	**10**

Final
1	**Stanford**	**5**	—
4	Fresno State	2	—

== College World Series ==
=== Participants ===
Seeding	School	Conference	Record (conference)	Head coach	CWS appearances	CWS best finish	CWS record
1	Alabama	SEC	52–12 (20–9)	Jim Wells	3 (last: 1996)	2nd (1983)	5–6
2	LSU	SEC	53–13 (22–7)	Skip Bertman	8 (last: 1996)	1st (1991, 1993, 1996)	19–11
3	Stanford	Pac-10	43–18 (21–9)	Mark Marquess	9 (last: 1995)	1st (1987, 1988)	21–16
4	UCLA	Pac-10	45–19–1 (19–11)	Gary Adams	1 (last: 1969)	7th (1969)	0–2
5	Miami (FL)	n/a	49–16 (n/a)	Jim Morris	15 (last: 1996)	1st (1982, 1985)	32–26
6	Auburn	SEC	49–15 (17–12)	Hal Baird	3 (last: 1994)	4th (1967)	2–6
7	Rice	WAC	47–14 (20–9)	Wayne Graham	0 (last: none)	none	0–0
8	Mississippi State	SEC	46–19 (19–11)	Ron Polk	5 (last: 1990)	3rd (1985)	5–10

=== Results ===
==== Bracket ====
First round
1	Alabama	3
8	Mississippi State	2
4	UCLA	3
5	Miami (FL)	7^{12}
8	Mississippi State	7
4	UCLA	5
2	LSU	5
7	Rice	4
3	Stanford	8
6	Auburn	3
7	Rice	1
6	Auburn	10

Second round
1	Alabama	1
5	Miami (FL)	6
1	Alabama	9
8	Mississippi State	5
2	LSU	10
3	Stanford	5
3	Stanford	11
6	Auburn	4

Semifinals
5	Miami (FL)	6	2
1	Alabama	8	8
2	LSU	13	—
3	Stanford	9	—

Finals
1	Alabama	6
2	LSU	13

==== Game results ====
Date	Game	Winner	Score	Loser	Notes
May 30	Game 1	Stanford	8–3	Auburn	
May 30	Game 2	LSU	5–4	Rice	
May 31	Game 3	Miami (FL)	7–3 (12 innings)	UCLA	
May 31	Game 4	Alabama	3–2	Mississippi State	
June 1	Game 5	LSU	10–5	Stanford	
June 1	Game 6	Auburn	10–1	Rice	Rice eliminated
June 2	Game 7	Miami (FL)	6–1	Alabama	
June 2	Game 8	Mississippi State	7–5	UCLA	UCLA eliminated
June 3	Game 9	Stanford	11–4	Auburn	Auburn eliminated
June 3	Game 10	Alabama	9–5	Mississippi State	Mississippi State eliminated
June 4	Game 11	LSU	13–9	Stanford	Stanford eliminated
June 5	Game 12	Alabama	8–6	Miami (FL)	
June 6	Game 13	Alabama	8–2	Miami (FL)	Miami (FL) eliminated
June 7	Final	LSU	13–6	Alabama	LSU wins CWS

== All-Tournament Team ==
The following players were members of the College World Series All-Tournament Team.

Position	Player	School
P	Jeff Austin	Stanford
P	Jarrod Kingrey	Alabama
C	Matt Frick	Alabama
1B	Eddy Furniss	LSU
2B	Joe Caruso	Alabama
3B	Andy Phillips	Alabama
SS	Brandon Larson (MOP)	LSU
OF	Tom Bernhardt	LSU
OF	G.W. Keller	Alabama
OF	Mike Koerner	LSU
DH	Mark Peer	Alabama

=== Notable players ===
- Alabama: Dustan Mohr, Andy Phillips
- Auburn: Josh Hancock, Tim Hudson, David Ross
- LSU: Brandon Larson
- Miami (FL): Pat Burrell, Bobby Hill, Aubrey Huff, Jason Michaels
- Mississippi State: Eric DuBose, Matt Ginter, Adam Piatt
- Rice: Matt Anderson, Lance Berkman, Kevin Joseph
- Stanford: Jeff Austin, Tony Cogan, Chad Hutchinson, Kyle Peterson
- UCLA: Eric Byrnes, Troy Glaus, Tom Jacquez, Jim Parque, Eric Valent

== See also ==
- 1997 NCAA Division II baseball tournament
- 1997 NCAA Division III baseball tournament
- 1997 NAIA World Series
