= Andy Merchant =

American baseball player (born 1950)

- Catcher
- Born: August 30, 1950 (age 76); Mobile, Alabama, U.S.
- Batted: Left Threw: Right

MLB debut
- September 28, 1975, for the Boston Red Sox

Last MLB appearance
- June 10, 1976, for the Boston Red Sox

MLB statistics
- Batting average: .333
- Home Runs: 0
- RBI: 0
- Stats at Baseball Reference

Teams
- Boston Red Sox (1975–1976)

James Anderson Merchant (born August 30, 1950) is an American former professional baseball catcher. Drafted in the tenth round by the Boston Red Sox in 1972, he played in a total of three major-league games for them in 1975 and 1976, collecting two hits and scoring one run. He batted left-handed, threw right-handed, and was listed as 5 feet 11 inches (1.80 m) tall and 185 pounds (84 kg).

Merchant attended Murphy High School in his native city, Mobile, Alabama. He then attended and graduated from Auburn University. After signing with the Red Sox, he began his pro career in 1972 and spent eight seasons in Boston's farm system, including five with the Triple-A Pawtucket Red Sox.

Of his three MLB games played, the most notable was his debut. On September 28, 1975 — the day after the Red Sox secured the 1975 American League East Division championship — Merchant was Boston's starting catcher against the Cleveland Indians at Fenway Park. Batting third in the lineup, Merchant collected two singles and a base on balls in five plate appearances. He played errorless ball in the field, recording two putouts, one assist and one caught stealing, although he allowed one stolen base (to the Indians' Oscar Gamble). Because he was a late-season call-up from the minor leagues, he was not on the Red Sox' postseason roster.

Merchant's minor-league career ended in 1979. He currently resides in Malcolm, Alabama.
