= Hal Baird =

American baseball player and coach

Playing career
- 1970–1971: East Carolina
- Position: Pitcher

Coaching career (HC unless noted)
- 1977–1979: East Carolina (assistant)
- 1980–1984: East Carolina
- 1985–2000: Auburn

Head coaching record
- Overall: 779–394–1

Hal Baird is a retired college baseball coach. From 1980 to 1984, Baird coached at East Carolina University. In 1985, he became the head coach at Auburn University where he remained until 2000. While at Auburn, he became the school's most successful head coach in history, winning a total of 634 games and he led his team to the 1994 College World Series and the 1997 College World Series. He is a member of the East Carolina University Athletic Hall of Fame, the Auburn University Hall of Fame, the American Baseball Coaches Association Hall of Fame and the Alabama Sports Hall of Fame. Hal Baird was a standout in baseball for 15 years as a player, assistant coach and head coach at East Carolina (ECU). A 1971 ECU graduate, Baird helped the Pirates to a Southern Conference title and an NCAA Tournament appearance in 1970. In the league championship game against George Washington, Baird struck out a Southern Conference record 20 batters. His 105 strikeouts in 1971 ranks among the top performances in school history.

Following his college career, Baird played for the Cleveland Indians and Kansas City Royals organizations where he earned All-Gulf Coast League, All-Florida Instructional League and All-Southern League honors. He went on to serve as an assistant coach at ECU from 1977 to 1979 before being named head coach in 1979. Over the next five years, Baird led the Pirates to a pair of ECAC-South championships and three NCAA Tournament appearances. He finished his coaching career at East Carolina with a record of 145–66–1.

His record as coach of the Auburn Tigers is 634–328. From 1985 to 2000, he won more baseball games than any coach in Auburn history. His overall coaching record is 779–394–1 (.663). Baird guided the Tigers to three NCAA Regional titles, an SEC Western Division championship and an SEC Tournament championship and 10 times during Baird's Auburn tenure his teams finish the season ranked in the top 25. His Auburn teams won at least 30 games in every season he was the head coach and the program participated in nine NCAA Regionals during his stay, including seven in his last eight years at Auburn.

Ten Auburn players earned All-America honors under Baird's tutelage while a total of 51 players were drafted off of Baird's teams, which included Gregg Olson, Bo Jackson, Frank Thomas and Tim Hudson. In 2010 former Auburn and major league star, Frank Thomas, stated "Hal (Baird) always pushed me. He would always compare me to Bo (Jackson) in center field. He would say, 'Maybe if you work a little harder, you can climb that wall.' I would always say, 'Coach, there's only one Bo Jackson.' He pushed me and got me ready to play at the next level and I'm very thankful for that. I was lucky to play with Hal. He had so much experience with major leaguers that he could easily compare you and tell you what you were lacking. He really prepared me for the next level." Major league pitcher Tim Hudson said, "When I got drafted, I thought that A-ball was a step down from SEC baseball. It wasn't quite as good as AA, but it definitely got you better for what to expect at the next level. I'm just thrilled that I had the opportunity to play here (at Auburn) and play under Coach Baird. He was vital to not only my career, but a lot of the other pitchers who came through here."

Baird was named head coach at Auburn in 1985 and immediately turned things around. The Tigers had suffered through three consecutive 10th-place conference finishes and one eighth-place mark in the previous four years. Auburn showed improvement with a 30–22 record in his first season and, in 1986, advanced to the SEC Tournament for the first time in six years, finishing third in the league standings. By 1987 Baird had led the Tigers to a 42–18 mark and an 18–9 conference record with a third-place finish in the SEC. Both the overall and conference wins set new Auburn records for a single season, both of which he topped later on in his career.

Baird's 1995 team not only won 40 games, but it did so quicker than any team in SEC history, taking just 45 games to reach that accomplishment. Auburn won the SEC Western Division en route to finishing with a school-best record of 50–13 and, for the first time in school history, the 1995 Tigers were the No. 1 seed at an NCAA Regional and spent part of the season as the top-ranked team in the country. During the 1990s, Baird's teams won 68.1 percent of their games.

Baird pitched professionally from 1971 to 1976, four of seasons years at the AAA level. He was inducted into the Alabama Baseball Coaches Association Hall of Fame in 2006. In July 2020 the American Baseball Coaches Association announced that Hal would be inducted into their Hall of Fame as part of the induction class of 2021. He grew up in Virginia and was a multi-sport letterman at Prince George High School. He has been married to his high school sweetheart, the former Janie Megee, since 1972.
