= 1997 LSU Tigers baseball team =

American college baseball season

1997 LSU Tigers baseball

National Champions SEC Champions
- Conference: Southeastern Conference
- West
- Record: 57-13 (22-7 SEC)
- Head coach: Skip Bertman
- Hitting coach: Jim Schwanke
- Pitching coach: Mike Bianco
- Home stadium: Alex Box Stadium

1997 Southeastern Conference baseball standings
	Conf.				Overall
Team	W		L	PCT	W		L	PCT
Eastern
No. 16 Florida ^{x}‍‍‍	17	–	13	.567	40	–	24	.625
No. 25 Tennessee ^{x}‍‍‍	17	–	13	.567	42	–	19	.689
Vanderbilt ‍‍‍	14	–	16	.467	31	–	24	.564
South Carolina ‍‍‍	13	–	17	.433	33	–	24	.579
Kentucky ‍‍‍	10	–	20	.333	20	–	34	.370
Georgia ‍‍‍	8	–	22	.267	28	–	27	.509
Western
No. 1 LSU ^{x}‍†‍‍	22	–	7	.759	57	–	13	.814
No. 2 Alabama ‍‍‡‍	20	–	9	.690	56	–	14	.800
No. 7 Mississippi State ‍‍‍	19	–	11	.633	47	–	21	.691
No. 6 Auburn ‍‍‍	17	–	12	.586	50	–	17	.746
Arkansas ‍‍‍	15	–	14	.517	36	–	20	.643
Ole Miss ‍‍‍	6	–	24	.200	22	–	31	.415
x – Division champion † – Conference champion ‡ – Tournament champion Rankings from Baseball America

The 1997 LSU Tigers baseball team won a second consecutive NCAA championship at the College World Series, and the fourth overall for the school. The 1997 team put on an impressive display of power, hitting an NCAA record 188 home runs, including one in each of the 70 games they played that season.

The Tigers were coached by Skip Bertman, who was in his 14th season as LSU head baseball coach. LSU set a school record for victories, finishing with a 57–13 record, and won their second straight Southeastern Conference championship with a 22–7 overall mark.

== Schedule/results ==
1997 LSU Tigers baseball Game Log

Regular season

February
#	Date	Opponent	Score	Site/stadium	Win	Loss	Save	Attendance	Overall record	SEC Record
1	February 15	Baylor	13–2	Alex Box Stadium	Shipp (1–0)	Bradford (0–1)	-	6,563	1–0	
2	February 15	Baylor	11–5	Alex Box Stadium	Coogan (1–0)	Lambert (0–1)	-	6,140	2–0	
3	February 16	Baylor	8–3	Alex Box Stadium	Painich (1–0)	Wells (0–1)	-	6,549	3–0	
4	February 18	Centenary	9–2	Alex Box Stadium	Berthelot (1–0)	Schoenborn (0–1)	-	5,687	4–0	
5	February 19	Southern	16–2	Alex Box Stadium	Thompson (1–0)	Gordon (1–1)	-	5,636	5-0	
6	February 21	North Carolina	11–4	Superdome	Shipp (2–0)	Elmore (0–1)	-	7,727	6–0	
7	February 22	N.C. State	3–2	Superdome	Coogan (2–0)	Black (1–2)	-	11,449	7–0	
8	February 23	Duke	9–8	Superdome	Demouy (1–0)	Sullivan (0–1)	-	7,755	8–0	
9	February 28	VCU	15–2	Alex Box Stadium	Coogan (3–0)	Finley (2–2)	-	5,488	9–0	

March
#	Date	Opponent	Score	Site/stadium	Win	Loss	Save	Attendance	Overall record	SEC record
10	March 1	VCU	22–0	Alex Box Stadium	Thompson (2–0)	Burch (0–3)	-	6,104	10–0	
11	March 2	VCU	6–4	Alex Box Stadium	Berthelot (2–0)	Berryman (2–2)	-	5,546	11–0	
12	March 4	Tulane	8–5	Alex Box Stadium	Coogan (4–0)	Brown (0–1)	-	7,017	12–0	
13	March 5	Southern	12–1	Alex Box Stadium	Painich (2–0)	Williams (1–1)	-	5,503	13–0	
14	March 7	Vanderbilt	19–5	Alex Box Stadium	Coogan (5–0)	Seybt (1–2)	-	6,848	14–0	1-0
15	March 8	Vanderbilt	8–7	Alex Box Stadium	Berthelot (3–0)	Snow (2–2)	Demouy (1)	6,975	15–0	2-0
16	March 9	Vanderbilt	7–3	Alex Box Stadium	Shipp (3–0)	Colley (2–2)	-	6,635	16–0	3-0
17	March 11	Louisiana Tech	8–2	Alex Box Stadium	Berthelot (4–0)	Sonnier (1–2)	Coogan (1)	6,548	17–0	
18	March 12	Louisiana College	14–7	Alex Box Stadium	Painich (3–0)	Teeter (1–3)	-	5,920	18–0	
19	March 14	Georgia	6–5 (10)	Foley Field	Demouy (2–0)	Jerue (1–1)	-	2,302	19–0	4-0
20	March 15	Georgia	9–11	Foley Field	Brownlee (3–0)	Demouy (2–1)	Crawford (2)	2,024	19–1	4-1
21	March 16	Georgia	7–3	Foley Field	Coogan (6–0)	Bridges (3–1)	Thompson (1)	2,018	20–1	5-1
22	March 18	New Orleans	4–6	Privateer Park	Faust (5–0)	Thompson (2–1)	Cabeceiras (1)	5,288	20–2	
23	March 21	Florida	11–3	Alex Box Stadium	Shipp (4–0)	Edge (2–2)	-	6,898	21–2	6-1
24	March 22	Florida	13–10	Alex Box Stadium	Daugherty (1–0)	Wilkerson (4–3)	Painich (1)	6,659	22–2	7-1
25	March 23	Florida	9–5	Alex Box Stadium	Thompson (3–1)	McClendon (4–2)	-	6,660	23–2	8-1
26	March 25	Louisiana Tech	13–1	J.C. Love Field	Painich (4–0)	Kelly (0–1)	-	3,251	24–2	
27	March 26	NE Louisiana	2–6	Indian Field	Loland (2–2)	Berthelot (4–1)	-	4,371	24–3	
28	March 28	Tennessee	12–3	Lindsey Nelson Stadium	Coogan (7–0)	Cosgrove (5–2)	-	2,795	25–3	9-1
29	March 29	Tennessee	7–2	Lindsey Nelson Stadium	Thompson (4–1)	Folkers (3–1)	-	3,337	26–3	10-1
30	March 30	Tennessee	8–6 (11)	Lindsey Nelson Stadium	Berthelot (5–1)	Myers (5–2)	Albritton (1)	2,757	27–3	11-1

April
#	Date	Opponent	Score	Site/stadium	Win	Loss	Save	Attendance	Overall record	SEC record
31	April 1	Nicholls State	13–5	Alex Box Stadium	Demouy (3–1)	Viator (1–4)	-	7,012	28–3	
32	April 2	McNeese State	9–6	Alex Box Stadium	Daugherty (2–0)	Huggins (2–6)	-	6,591	29–3	
33	April 4	South Carolina	9–8	Alex Box Stadium	Coogan (8–0)	Moore (1–1)	Demouy (2)	6,538	30–3	12-1
34	April 5	South Carolina	7–8	Alex Box Stadium	Jodie (6–0)	Thompson (4–2)	Speer (1)	6,753	30–4	12-2
35	April 6	South Carolina	11–10 (7)	Alex Box Stadium	Berthelot (6–1)	Hoshour (4–2)	Coogan (2)	6,828	31–4	13-2
36	April 8	Tulane	12–2	Turchin Stadium	Demouy (4–1)	Bell (3–2)	-	4,500	32–4	
37	April 9	NE Louisiana	12–4	Alex Box Stadium	Painich (5–0)	Sheets (2–2)	-	6,575	33–4	
38	April 12	Mississippi State	6–9	Dudy Noble Field	Johnson (3–1)	Coogan (8–1)	-	-	33–5	13-3
39	April 12	Mississippi State	20–12	Dudy Noble Field	Thompson (5–2)	Dilgard (5–1)	-	6,032	34–5	14-3
40	April 13	Mississippi State	1–4	Dudy Noble Field	Jackson (6–2)	Painich (5–1)	Johnson (7)	4,012	34–6	14-4
41	April 15	SW Louisiana	8–10	Alex Box Stadium	Devey (1–0)	Coogan (8–2)	-	6,752	34–7	
42	April 16	SE Louisiana	11–4	Alex Box Stadium	Guillory (1–0)	Pitarro (2–1)	-	5,986	35–7	
43	April 18	Ole Miss	7–1	Alex Box Stadium	Coogan (9–2)	Walker (1–2)	-	6,775	36–7	15-4
44	April 19	Ole Miss	6–4	Alex Box Stadium	Daugherty (3–0)	DeYoung (3–6)	Demouy (3)	6,661	37–7	16-4
45	April 20	Ole Miss	11–4	Alex Box Stadium	Painich (6–1)	Rodgers (3–3)	-	6,713	38–7	17-4
46	April 22	New Orleans	8–11	Alex Box Stadium	Hymel (5–2)	Berthelot (6–2)	-	6,413	38–8	
47	April 23	Northwestern State	11–5	Alex Box Stadium	Demouy (5–1)	Lawrence (7–3)	-	5,761	39–8	
48	April 25	Auburn	7–1	Alex Box Stadium	Coogan (10–2)	Hudson (10–2)	-	6,866	40–8	18-4
49	April 26	Auburn	8–0	Alex Box Stadium	Thompson (6–2)	Hebson (8–2)	-	7,018	41–8	19-4
50	April 29	Southern	11–1	Alex Box Stadium	Painich (7–1)	Robinson (5–1)	-	6,565	42–8	

May
#	Date	Opponent	Score	Site/stadium	Win	Loss	Save	Attendance	Overall record	SEC record
51	May 2	Arkansas	13–8	Baum Stadium	Daugherty (4–0)	Lunney (4–2)	-	3,918	43–8	20-4
52	May 3	Arkansas	11–5	Baum Stadium	Thompson (7–2)	Carnes (6–4)	-	5,067	44–8	21-4
53	May 4	Arkansas	1–16	Baum Stadium	Wright (5–2)	Painich (7–1)	Franks (7)	4,118	44–9	21-5
54	May 9	Alabama	4–6	Sewell-Thomas Stadium	Vaz (3–1)	Coogan (10–3)	-	5,117	44–10	21-6
55	May 10	Alabama	2–28	Sewell-Thomas Stadium	Henderson (10–2)	Thompson (7–3)	-	5,117	44–11	21-7
56	May 11	Alabama	6–4	Sewell-Thomas Stadium	Thompson (8–2)	Fisher (8–2)	Demouy (4)	5,117	45–11	22-7

Post-season

SEC baseball tournament
#	Date	Opponent	Score	Site/stadium	Win	Loss	Save	Attendance	Overall record	SECT Record
57	May 15	Auburn	5–2	Golden Park	Coogan (11–3)	Schoening (5–2)	Demouy (5)	3,642	46–11	1-0
58	May 16	Tennessee	12–5	Golden Park	Thompson (9–3)	Cosgrove (10–5)	-	2,576	47–11	2-0
59	May 17	Alabama	12–7	Golden Park	Painich (8–2)	Bernard (4–4)	-	4,030	48–11	3-0
60	May 18	Alabama	2–12	Golden Park	Daniel (5–0)	Berthelot (6–3)	-	4,268	48–12	3-1

NCAA South I Regional
#	Date	Opponent	Score	Site/stadium	Win	Loss	Save	Attendance	Overall record	NCAAT Record
61	May 22	UNC Greensboro	14–0	Alex Box Stadium	Coogan (12–3)	Surridge (6–6)	-	6,654	49–12	1-0
62	May 23	Oklahoma	14–3	Alex Box Stadium	Thompson (10–3)	Smith (3–1)	Guillory (1)	6,573	50–12	2-0
63	May 24	South Alabama	5–11	Alex Box Stadium	Rayborn (2–1)	Shipp (4–1)	Nakamura (2)	6,726	50–13	2-1
64	May 25	Long Beach State	14–7 (11)	Alex Box Stadium	Coogan (13–3)	Petrosian (4–3)	-	6,687	51–13	3-1
65	May 26	South Alabama	14–4	Alex Box Stadium	Thompson (11–3)	Norton (9–6)	-	-	52–13	4-1
66	May 26	South Alabama	15–4	Alex Box Stadium	Painich (9–2)	Sparks (11–1)	Daugherty (1)	7,041	53–13	5-1

College World Series
#	Date	Opponent	Score	Site/stadium	Win	Loss	Save	Attendance	Overall record	NCAAT Record
67	May 30	Rice	5–4	Rosenblatt Stadium	Demouy (6–1)	Anderson (10–2)	-	20,551	54–13	6-1
68	June 1	Stanford	10–5	Rosenblatt Stadium	Coogan (14–3)	Peterson (11–3)	-	23,867	55–13	7-1
69	June 4	Stanford	13–9	Rosenblatt Stadium	Berthelot (7–3)	Hutchinson (8–4)	Coogan (3)	22,218	56–13	8-1
70	June 7	Alabama	13–6	Rosenblatt Stadium	Thompson (12–3)	Daniel (5–1)	-	24,401	57–13	9-1

== Statistical leaders ==
Batting Average	
Brandon Larson	.381
Eddy Furniss	.378
Blair Barbier	.353

Hits	
Brandon Larson	110
Eddy Furniss	98
Mike Koerner	96

Home Runs	
Brandon Larson	40
Mike Koerner	22
Eddy Furniss	17
Tom Bernhardt	17

RBI	
Brandon Larson	118
Eddy Furniss	77
Mike Koerner	69

Wins	
Patrick Coogan	14
Doug Thompson	12
Joey Painich	9

ERA	
Chris Demouy	3.63
Kevin Shipp	4.10
Patrick Coogan	4.46

Strikeouts	
Doug Thompson	158
Patrick Coogan	144
Joey Painich	72
