= Travis Chapman =

American baseball player and coach (born 1975)

- Third baseman / Coach
- Born: June 5, 1978 (age 48); Jacksonville, Florida, U.S.
- Batted: Right Threw: Right

MLB debut
- September 9, 2003, for the Philadelphia Phillies

Last MLB appearance
- September 9, 2003, for the Philadelphia Phillies

MLB statistics
- Batting average: .000
- At bats: 1
- Hits: 0
- Stats at Baseball Reference

Teams
- As player: Philadelphia Phillies (2003); As coach: New York Yankees (2022–2025)

Travis Adrian Chapman (born June 5, 1978) is an American former professional baseball third baseman who played one game in Major League Baseball (MLB) for the Philadelphia Phillies in 2003. He recently served as the first base and infield coach for the New York Yankees.

== Playing career ==
Chapman attended Bishop Kenny High School in Jacksonville, Florida. He enrolled at Mississippi State University, where he played college baseball for the Mississippi State Bulldogs. He played collegiate summer baseball with the Orleans Cardinals of the Cape Cod Baseball League in 1998. He was drafted by the Phillies in the 17th round of the 2000 Major League Baseball draft and played his first professional season with the Batavia Muckdogs of the New York-Penn League.

The Phillies promoted Chapman to the major leagues on September 2, 2003. He appeared in one MLB game, on September 9, 2003, against the Atlanta Braves. He pinch hit for Tomás Pérez in the seventh inning against Braves pitcher Jung Bong and flew out to right field. Chapman finished the game at third base.

Chapman spent seven seasons in the minor leagues with the Phillies, Kansas City Royals, Cincinnati Reds, and Pittsburgh Pirates organizations before retiring after the 2006 season. In 1,771 career minor league at bats, he hit .286, with 41 home runs.

== Coaching career ==
Chapman became coach with the New York Yankees farm team, the Charleston RiverDogs and coached in the team's minor leagues in a variety of capacities for several years.

Following the 2021 season, the Yankees promoted Chapman to the major league coaching staff as their first base and infield coach. The Yankees fired Chapman after the 2025 season.
