= Brandon Larson =

American baseball player (born 1976)

- Third baseman
- Born: May 24, 1976 (age 50); San Angelo, Texas, U.S.
- Batted: Right Threw: Right

MLB debut
- May 4, 2001, for the Cincinnati Reds

Last MLB appearance
- July 17, 2004, for the Cincinnati Reds

MLB statistics
- Batting average: .179
- Home runs: 8
- Runs batted in: 37
- Stats at Baseball Reference

Teams
- Cincinnati Reds (2001–2004)

Brandon John Larson (born May 24, 1976) is an American former professional baseball third baseman. He played in Major League Baseball (MLB) for the Cincinnati Reds. Larson won the MVP for the 1997 College World Series.

== Career ==
After his successful 1997 college season with the LSU Tigers, he was drafted by the Cincinnati Reds in the 1st round (14th overall) of the 1997 amateur entry draft. He had one of the most prolific years in college baseball history, his one year of NCAA Division 1 Baseball, where he hit 40 home runs and had 118 RBIs with a .381 batting average. (1997)

Larson had success in the minor leagues, reaching Triple-A in 2001. In that year, he was nearly traded to the Philadelphia Phillies for future Hall of Fame third baseman Scott Rolen. The proposal was dropped due to financial reasons after Reds president John Allen intervened.

Larson had two outstanding following years (he was the All-Star 3B for the International League in 2002 and 2003, and was the Cincinnati Reds Minor League Player of the Year in 2003), but he never had success in the Major Leagues. He played in 40 games for the Reds in 2004, batting .212, and became a free agent after the season. He was signed by the Tampa Bay Devil Rays, then released at the end of 2005 spring training, and then signed by the Texas Rangers, and batted .289 at Double-A, before being released mid-season. He was signed by the Washington Nationals before the 2006 season, and batted .286 at Triple-A New Orleans. In 2007, he was in Double-A Harrisburg, batting .232 and on June 27 was released.

On July 20, 2007, Larson signed with the Somerset Patriots of the Atlantic League, batting .333 with 27 RBI the rest of the season. In 2008, he was selected to participate in the Atlantic League Home Run Derby and was elected to the All-star game.
