= Joe Lee Griffin Stadium =

Baseball venue in Birmingham, Alabama

- Griffin Stadium
- Interactive map of Joe Lee Griffin Stadium
- Location: 800 Lakeshore Drive, Birmingham, AL, USA
- Coordinates: 33.463393°N 86.79645°W
- Owner: Samford University
- Capacity: 1,000
- Surface: Natural grass

Construction
- Opened: April 14, 1958
- Renovated: 2000

Tenant
- Samford Bulldogs college baseball (SoCon)

Joe Lee Griffin Stadium is a baseball venue located in Birmingham, Alabama, USA. It is home to the Samford Bulldogs college baseball team of the Division I Southern Conference. It has a capacity of 1,000 spectators.

The facility was extensively renovated in 2000. It includes locker rooms and offices.

The stadium's street address is 800 Lakeshore Drive in Birmingham.

== See also ==
- List of NCAA Division I baseball venues
