= Plainsman Park =

Baseball park at Auburn University

Coordinates: 32.5998°N 85.4897°W

- View of the stadium behind home plate in 2010

- Location in Alabama Location in the United States
- Full name: Samford Stadium – Hitchcock Field at Plainsman Park
- Former names: Plainsman Park (1950–1997); Hitchcock Field at Plainsman Park (1997–2003)
- Address: 351 South Donahue Drive
- Location: Auburn, Alabama
- Owner: Auburn University
- Operator: Auburn University
- Capacity: 6,300
- Type: Stadium
- Event: Baseball
- Surface: Natural Grass/Artificial Turf
- Scoreboard: 24'0" x 62'4"
- Record attendance: 7,891 (June 6, 2025 vs. Coastal Carolina)
- Field size: LF: 315 ft (96.0 m) near LC: 335 ft (102.1 m) far LC: 385 ft (117.3 m); CF: 385 ft (117.3 m); RC: 361 ft (110.0 m); RF: 331 ft (100.9 m)

Construction
- Opened: 1950
- Renovated: 1996, 2025
- Architect: Cooke Douglass Farr Lemons

Tenant
- Auburn Tigers (1950–present)

Website
- auburntigers.com/plainsman-park

Plainsman Park, officially Samford Stadium – Hitchcock Field at Plainsman Park, is the college baseball venue for the Auburn University Tigers. As of 2025, its seating capacity is 6,300. In 2003, Baseball America rated the facility the best college baseball venue in the country. The park's signature is its 37-foot (11 m) high left field fence, nicknamed the "War Eagle Wall" for the large 'War Eagle' typeface on the fence, which is 315 feet (96 m) from home plate. The home team bullpen is located behind the left field fence, forcing media in the press box to use monitors to determine who is warming up.

Plainsman Park was first used as a baseball facility in 1950. In 1996, Auburn significantly renovated Plainsman Park, drawing inspiration from ballparks such as Camden Yards, Fenway Park, and Wrigley Field in their design for the park. The architect was Cooke Douglass Farr Lemons. In 1997, it was renamed Hitchcock Field at Plainsman Park in honor of brothers Jimmy and Billy Hitchcock. In 2003, the facility was renamed Samford Stadium – Hitchcock Field at Plainsman Park in honor of longtime trustee Jimmy Samford.

In October of 2022 Auburn's Board of Trustees approved expansion plans for Plainsman Park that would, in phases, add three new components to Plainsman Park: a 1st Base Club, a Right Field Terrace, and (eventually) a Green Monster Terrace. The 1st Base Club would consist of expanded stands down the 1st base line, premium seating and club space, concessions, and improvements to the south entrance of Plainsman Park. The Right Field Terrace would be situated on top of the Josh Donaldson Hitting Lab, which opened in January 2021 thanks to $4.8M in donations from sixty-nine families, individuals, and foundations. The 7,100 sq ft facility is named in recognition of Major League 3B Josh Donaldson, who played at Auburn from 2005 to 2007 before getting drafted with the 48th overall pick with the Chicago Cubs in 2007. The third component of the approved upgrades, a seating terrace above Auburn's Green Monster, was completed prior to the 2025 season.

In 2025, the Tigers ranked 9th among Division I baseball programs in attendance, averaging 5,603 per home game.

== See also ==
- List of NCAA Division I baseball venues
