= Tommy Raffo =

American baseball coach

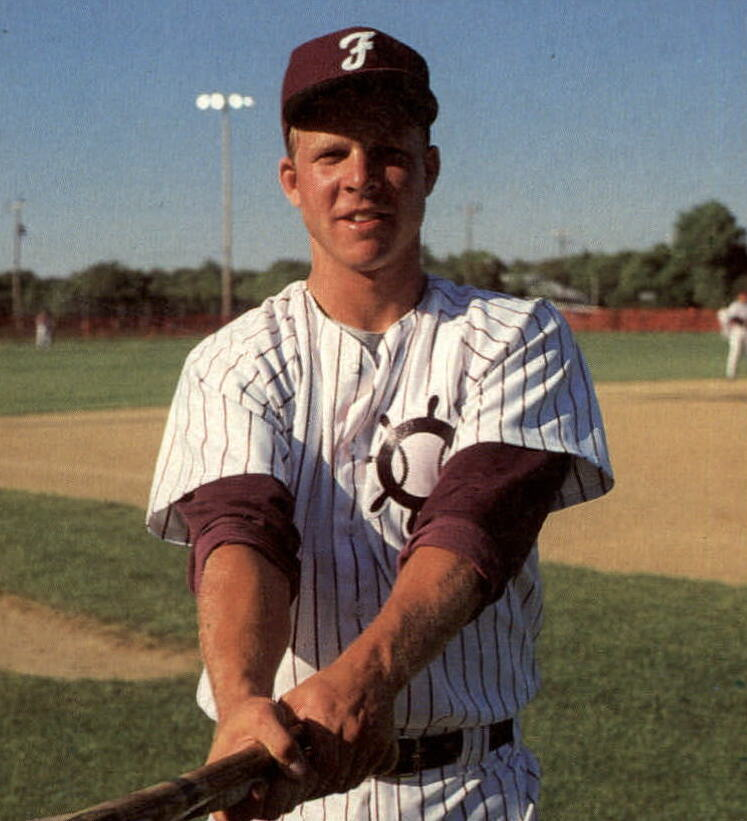
- Raffo with the Falmouth Commodores in 1988

Biographical details
- Born: December 22, 1967 (age 58)

Playing career
- 1987–1990: Mississippi State
- 1990: Miami Miracle
- 1991: Charleston Wheelers
- 1992: Cedar Rapids Reds
- 1993: St. Paul Saints
- Position: First baseman

Coaching career (HC unless noted)
- 1994–2008: Mississippi State (asst.)
- 2009–2024: Arkansas State

Head coaching record
- Overall: 381–459–2
- Tournaments: Sun Belt: 17–16; NCAA: 0–0

Accomplishments and honors

Awards
- Second Team All-SEC (1988); 2× First Team All-SEC (1989, 1990); Sun Belt Coach of the Year (2012)
Medal record
Men's baseball
Representing United States
World Junior Baseball Championship
Silver medal – second place	1985 Albany	Team

Thomas G. Raffo (born December 22, 1967) is an American college baseball coach and former first baseman. Raffo is the former head coach of the Arkansas State Red Wolves baseball team.

== Amateur career ==
Raffo attended Bishop Kenny High School in Jacksonville, Florida. He was named a First Team All-Florida Class AAA. He was drafted in the 34th round of the 1986 Major League Baseball draft by the Baltimore Orioles, but he decided not to sign. Raffo then accepted a scholarship to play at Mississippi State University, to play college baseball for the Mississippi State Bulldogs baseball team.

As a sophomore in 1988, Raffo was named Second Team All-Southeastern Conference (SEC), and after the season he played collegiate summer baseball with the Falmouth Commodores of the Cape Cod Baseball League.

As a junior in 1989, Raffo batted .383 with a 22 home runs and 80 RBIs. He was named First Team All-SEC.

As a senior in 1990, he batted .358 with 13 home runs and 69 RBIs. He was again named First Team All-SEC.

== Professional career ==
Raffo was drafted in the 8th round (209th overall) by the Miami Miracle in the 1990 Major League Baseball draft.

Raffo began his professional career with the Miracle of the Class A Florida State League, where he batted .258 with three home runs.

Raffo played 1991 season with the Charleston Wheelers of the Class A South Atlantic League as a member of the Cincinnati Reds organization. He batted .277 with 13 home runs and 68 RBIs in 133 games.

In 1992, he played with the Cedar Rapids Reds of the Midwest League. He batted .302 with nine home runs and 38 RBIs during the season. He signed with the St. Paul Saints to play the 1993 season. He hit .321 with 20 RBIs in 48 games.

== Coaching career ==
In 1994, Raffo was named a volunteer assistant at Mississippi State. In the fall of 1997, he was promoted to a full-time assistant. In 2008, Raffo was being considered for the head coaching position at Mississippi State, but when the team decided to go with John Cohen, he was named the head coach for the Arkansas State Red Wolves baseball program.

Raffo lead the Red Wolves to their best finish in Sun Belt Conference history going 19–9 finishing 2nd. As a result, he was named the 2012 Sun Belt Coach of the Year.

On May 29, 2024, Arkansas State Athletics and Vice Chancelor for Intercollegiate Athletics Jeff Purinton announced there would be a change in leadership for the Arkansas State baseball program and that Raffo would not return.

In 2025, Raffo was named Athletic Director for Nettleton (AR) Public Schools.

== Head coaching record ==
Record table
Season	Team	Overall	Conference	Standing	Postseason
Arkansas State Red Wolves (Sun Belt Conference) (2009–2024)
2009	Arkansas State	23–30	12–18	9th	
2010	Arkansas State	30–28	16–14	8th	Sun Belt Tournament
2011	Arkansas State	27–31–1	13–16–1	7th	Sun Belt Tournament
2012	Arkansas State	34–23	19–9	2nd	Sun Belt Tournament
2013	Arkansas State	28–31	12–18	8th	Sun Belt Tournament
2014	Arkansas State	32–27	18–12	3rd	Sun Belt Tournament
2015	Arkansas State	27–30	12–17	8th	Sun Belt Tournament
2016	Arkansas State	28–30	13–17	8th	Sun Belt Tournament
2017	Arkansas State	28–27	13–16	3rd (West)	Sun Belt Tournament
2018	Arkansas State	20–32	11–19	T-4th (West)	Sun Belt Tournament
2019	Arkansas State	26–29	11–20	6th (West)	
2020	Arkansas State	7–9	0–0	(West)	Season canceled due to COVID-19
2021	Arkansas State	19–30	10–14	5th (West)	Sun Belt Tournament
2022	Arkansas State	11–38	5–24	12th	
2023	Arkansas State	20–30	9–19	6th (West)	
2024	Arkansas State	21–32–1	7–22–1	14th	
Arkansas State:		381–459–2	181–255–2		
Total:		381–459–2			
National champion Postseason invitational champion Conference regular season champion Conference regular season and conference tournament champion Division regular season champion Division regular season and conference tournament champion Conference tournament champion

== See also ==
- List of current NCAA Division I baseball coaches
