= Sewell–Thomas Stadium =

Baseball park at University of Alabama

- "The Joe"
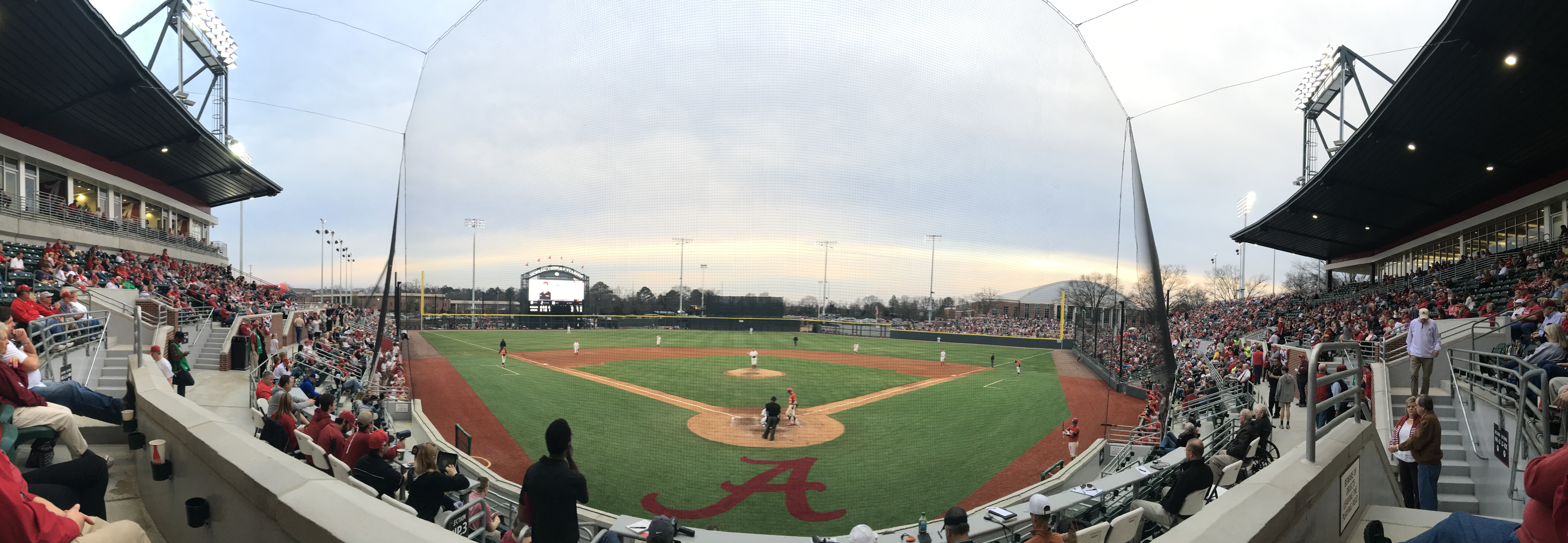
- Interactive map of Sewell–Thomas Stadium
- Location: 241 Paul W Bryant Drive, Tuscaloosa, Alabama 35401, United States
- Coordinates: 33.205156°N 87.538719°W
- Owner: University of Alabama
- Operator: University of Alabama
- Capacity: 8,500 (5,800 seated, 2,700 student section)
- Surface: Natural grass
- Field size: Foul lines: 320 feet Power alleys: 360 feet Center field: 390 feet

Construction
- Opened: March 26, 1948
- Renovated: 1996, 2001, 2015

Tenant
- Alabama Crimson Tide (NCAA) (1948–present)

Sewell–Thomas Stadium is a baseball stadium in Tuscaloosa, Alabama. It is the home field of the University of Alabama Crimson Tide college baseball team. The stadium opened in 1948 and the current seating capacity is 8,500. The stadium is commonly referred to as "The Joe".

Coleman Coliseum, the home to Crimson Tide basketball, is located beyond the right field fence. Sewell–Thomas sits across Paul W. Bryant Drive (formerly 10th Street) from the Bryant Museum and Conference Center.

== History ==
The stadium opened as Thomas Field on March 26, 1948, in honor of former Tide head football coach and athletic director Frank Thomas, with a capacity of 2,000. In 1978, a bill was introduced by undergraduate SGA Senator Mike Harrington to rename the stadium Sewell–Thomas Stadium, adding the name of former Alabama player and head coach Joe Sewell, who had just been inducted into the Baseball Hall of Fame in 1977.

Alabama has ranked in the top 10 nationally in attendance many times, particularly during the tenure of Jim Wells. In several years, the program has been in the nation's top 5 teams in average home attendance over the years, including second-place finishes in 2000, 2001, and 2002. In 2013, the Crimson Tide ranked 14th among Division I baseball programs in attendance, averaging 3,262 per home game.

=== Major renovations ===
In 2013, the University of Alabama Board of Trustees approved a $30 million full-renovation project for the stadium. While using some existing structures, the renovations essentially create a brand-new stadium. Renovations began immediately following the 2014 season and forced the team to play their home games at the Hoover Metropolitan Stadium during the 2015 season. The project was completed for the start of the 2016 season. Renovations included 12 suites, a new outfield walk that connects with the concourse, a playground and mini infield for families, a pre-game picnic area, team store, commissary, new seats, and an expanded canopy overhang over the primary seating area. New player amenities include a home team locker room and lounge, showers and restrooms, meeting room, weight room, bullpen and a four-lane indoor batting facility. The new seating capacity is 5,800 chair-back seats, plus 2,700 standing room only.

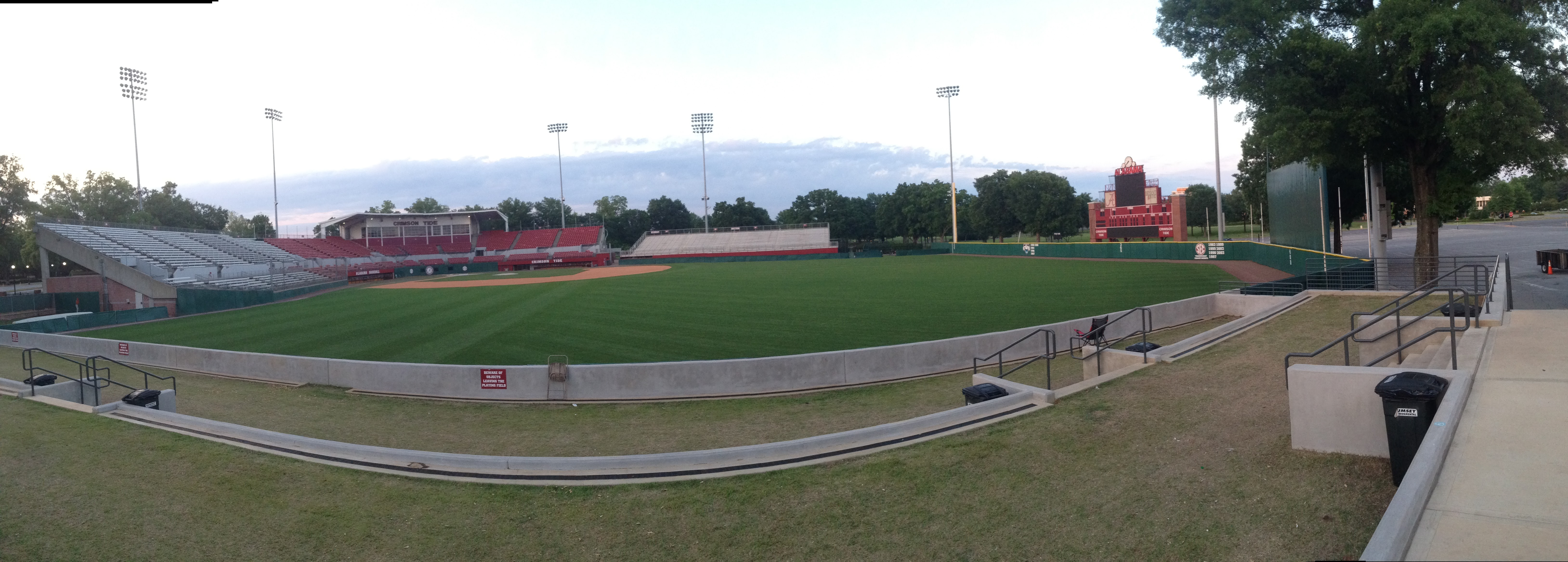
View from right field terrace, immediately prior to renovations

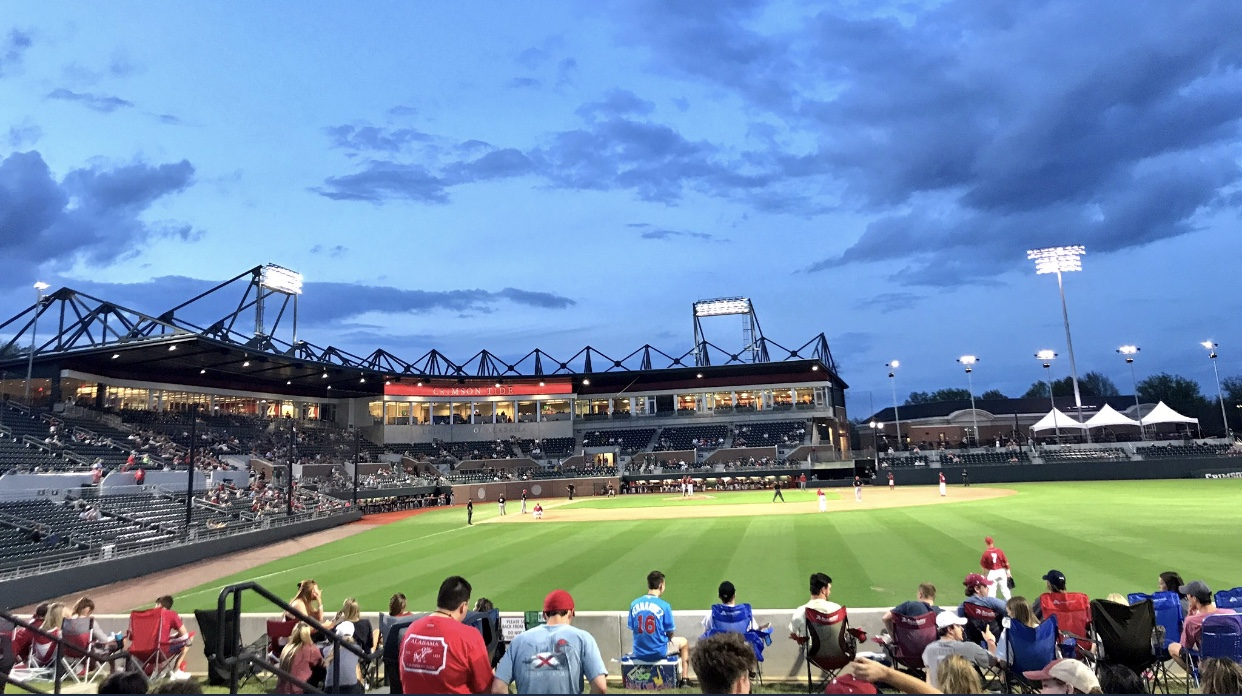
View from right field terrace, after renovations

== See also ==
- List of NCAA Division I baseball venues
- Alabama Crimson Tide baseball
