= 1997 Florida Gators baseball team =

American college baseball season

1997 Florida Gators baseball

SEC Eastern Division champions

Atlantic Regional, 2–2
- Conference: Southeastern Conference

Ranking
- Coaches: No. 18
- CB: No. 20
- Record: 40–24 (17–13 SEC)
- Head coach: Andy Lopez (3rd year)
- Assistant coach: Gary Henderson; Steve Kling; Eric Ekdahl
- Home stadium: Alfred A. McKethan Stadium

1997 Southeastern Conference baseball standings
	Conf.				Overall
Team	W		L	PCT	W		L	PCT
Eastern
No. 16 Florida ^{x}‍‍‍	17	–	13	.567	40	–	24	.625
No. 25 Tennessee ^{x}‍‍‍	17	–	13	.567	42	–	19	.689
Vanderbilt ‍‍‍	14	–	16	.467	31	–	24	.564
South Carolina ‍‍‍	13	–	17	.433	33	–	24	.579
Kentucky ‍‍‍	10	–	20	.333	20	–	34	.370
Georgia ‍‍‍	8	–	22	.267	28	–	27	.509
Western
No. 1 LSU ^{x}‍†‍‍	22	–	7	.759	57	–	13	.814
No. 2 Alabama ‍‍‡‍	20	–	9	.690	56	–	14	.800
No. 7 Mississippi State ‍‍‍	19	–	11	.633	47	–	21	.691
No. 6 Auburn ‍‍‍	17	–	12	.586	50	–	17	.746
Arkansas ‍‍‍	15	–	14	.517	36	–	20	.643
Ole Miss ‍‍‍	6	–	24	.200	22	–	31	.415
x – Division champion † – Conference champion ‡ – Tournament champion Rankings from Baseball America

The 1997 Florida Gators baseball team represented the University of Florida in the sport of baseball during the 1997 college baseball season. The Gators competed in Division I of the National Collegiate Athletic Association (NCAA) and the Eastern Division of the Southeastern Conference (SEC). They played their home games at Alfred A. McKethan Stadium, on the university's Gainesville, Florida campus. The team was coached by Andy Lopez, who was in his third season at Florida.

== Roster ==
1997 Florida Gators baseball team
Players
Coaches

#	Pos.	Name	B/T	Height	Weight	Year	Home town
9	INF	Nick Alvarez	R/R	6 ft 2 in (1.88 m)	179 lb (81 kg)	Jr	Miami, FL
33	INF	Travis Andre	R/R	6 ft 2 in (1.88 m)	198 lb (90 kg)	So	Greeley, CO
31	RHP	Charles Aulet	R/R	6 ft 1 in (1.85 m)	200 lb (91 kg)	So	Miami, FL
27	RHP	Tommy Bond	R/R	6 ft 3 in (1.91 m)	189 lb (86 kg)	Jr	Ocala, FL
45	RHP	Keith Brice	R/R	6 ft 1 in (1.85 m)	180 lb (82 kg)	Fr	Miami, FL
50	RHP	Jeffrey Cardozo	R/R	6 ft 3 in (1.91 m)	185 lb (84 kg)	Fr	Hobe Sound, FL
18	INF	David Eckstein	R/R	5 ft 9 in (1.75 m)	160 lb (73 kg)	Sr	Sanford, FL
23	OF	Dwight Edge	R/R	6 ft 6 in (1.98 m)	230 lb (104 kg)	Fr	Apopka, FL
2	INF	Mark Ellis	R/R	5 ft 11 in (1.8 m)	160 lb (73 kg)	So	Rapid City, SD
47	OF	Mike Floyd	R/R	6 ft 2 in (1.88 m)	180 lb (82 kg)	Fr	Brandon, FL
22	RHP	Josh Fogg	R/R	6 ft 1 in (1.85 m)	175 lb (79 kg)	So	Margate, FL
48	LHP	Evan Fujinaga	L/L	5 ft 10 in (1.78 m)	160 lb (73 kg)	Sr	Torrance, CA
44	LHP	Ryan Gleichowski	L/L	5 ft 10 in (1.78 m)	160 lb (73 kg)	Fr	Clearwater, FL
17	RHP	Michael Gray	R/R	6 ft 3 in (1.91 m)	200 lb (91 kg)	Jr	Fernandina Beach, FL
37	OF	Brian Haught	R/R	5 ft 10 in (1.78 m)	164 lb (74 kg)	So	Tampa, FL
24	INF	Chuck Hazzard	R/R	6 ft 4 in (1.93 m)	210 lb (95 kg)	Jr	Dallas, TX
13	INF	Josh Hudson	R/R	6 ft 0 in (1.83 m)	180 lb (82 kg)	Fr	Columbus, GA
46	RHP	Jeff Jackson	R/R	5 ft 11 in (1.8 m)	168 lb (76 kg)	So	Tampa, FL
40	C	Todd Johannes	R/R	6 ft 2 in (1.88 m)	157 lb (71 kg)	So	Miami, FL
3	INF	Tim Johnson	R/R	6 ft 2 in (1.88 m)	195 lb (88 kg)	Fr	Coventry, CT
30	RHP	Chris Knollin	R/R	6 ft 2 in (1.88 m)	201 lb (91 kg)	Sr	Melrose Park, IL
43	RHP	Steve Lockett	R/R	6 ft 2 in (1.88 m)	185 lb (84 kg)	Sr	Tavares, FL
5	INF	Ty Martin	S/R	6 ft 1 in (1.85 m)	160 lb (73 kg)	Fr	Melbourne, FL
36	RHP	Arin McCarthy	R/R	6 ft 4 in (1.93 m)	185 lb (84 kg)	Sr	Torrance, CA
34	RHP	Matt McClendon	R/R	6 ft 6 in (1.98 m)	210 lb (95 kg)	Fr	Orlando, FL
28	C	Octavio Medina	R/R	6 ft 0 in (1.83 m)	200 lb (91 kg)	So	Miami, FL
11	INF	Derek Nicholson	S/R	6 ft 0 in (1.83 m)	200 lb (91 kg)	Jr	Torrance, CA
38	OF	Brian Ogle	L/L	5 ft 9 in (1.75 m)	172 lb (78 kg)	Sr	Rapid City, SD
35	INF	Alan Rhine	R/R	5 ft 11 in (1.8 m)	170 lb (77 kg)	Fr	Sebring, FL
25	LHP	Sergio Rodriguez	L/L	6 ft 0 in (1.83 m)	180 lb (82 kg)	So	Miami, FL
32	OF	Shane Seroyer	R/R	6 ft 0 in (1.83 m)	183 lb (83 kg)	So	Neptune Beach, FL
15	C	Casey Smith	R/R	5 ft 10 in (1.78 m)	190 lb (86 kg)	Jr	Dallas, TX
21	RHP	Brian Varnes	R/R	6 ft 1 in (1.85 m)	195 lb (88 kg)	Sr	Panama City, FL
12	OF	Brad Wilkerson	L/L	6 ft 0 in (1.83 m)	193 lb (88 kg)	So	Owensboro, KY

Head coach

Andy Lopez

Assistant coach(es)

Gary Henderson
Steve Kling
Eric Ekdahl

Legend

- (C) Team captain
- (S) Suspended
- (I) Ineligible
- Injured
- Current redshirt

Roster

== See also ==
- Florida Gators
- List of Florida Gators baseball players
