= Jim Wells (baseball) =

American baseball coach (born 1955)

Current position
- Title: Head Coach

Biographical details
- Born: March 21, 1955 (age 71)

Coaching career (HC unless noted)
- 1987–1989: LSU (Asst.)
- 1990–1994: Northwestern State
- 1995–2009: Alabama

Head coaching record
- Overall: 817–411

Accomplishments and honors

Championships
- SLC Regular Season: 1991, 1993, 1994; SEC Regular Season: 1996, 2006; SEC Tournament: 1995, 1996, 1997, 1999, 2002, 2003

Awards
- SEC Coach of the Year: 1996, 2002

Jim Wells (born March 21, 1955) is an American college baseball coach, formerly the head coach at Northwestern State and Alabama. Overall, in 18 seasons as a Division 1 head coach, he compiled a 714–335 record. In 18 seasons, he won five regular season conference titles, eight post-season conference championships, as well as 13 of 17 tournament appearances. Three of his teams advanced to the College World Series.

Wells guided the Crimson Tide to NCAA tournament appearances in 10 out of his 12 seasons there. His teams also won the SEC tournament six times. In 1996, and 2002, he won the SEC Coach of the Year awards.

On September 1, 2009, Wells officially announced his retirement as head coach of the Alabama Crimson Tide baseball program. Wells retired after 15 seasons as head coach of the Crimson Tide, posting a 625–322 (.656) overall record during his tenure. Alabama hired Mitch Gaspard to replace Wells.

== Awards and honors ==
- Three college world series appearances
- Two SEC championships
- Three SEC West Division Titles
- Six SEC Tournament Championships
- Four 50 win seasons, including 12 40 win seasons
- Two time SEC coach of the year
- 1997 Baseball America Coach of the Year

== Year-by-year record ==
Year	School	Overall	Conference
1990	Northwestern State	38–13	9–9
1991	Northwestern State	40–21	13–5
1992	Northwestern State	29–26	9–13
1993	Northwestern State	40–14	18–6
1994	Northwestern State	45–15	16–5
1995	Alabama	42–23	19–11
1996	Alabama	50–19	20–10
1997	Alabama	56–14	20–9
1998	Alabama	46–18	19–9
1999	Alabama	53–16	22–8
2000	Alabama	42–24	16–14
2001	Alabama	32–23	15–15
2002	Alabama	51–15	20–10
2003	Alabama	38–24	14–16
2004	Alabama	29–26	10–20
2005	Alabama	40–23	17–13
2006	Alabama	44–21	20–10
2007	Alabama	31–26	15–15
2008	Alabama	35–28	16–14
2009	Alabama	37–21	18–11
OVERALL		817–411	
