= UCLA Bruins baseball statistical leaders =

The UCLA Bruins baseball statistical leaders are individual statistical leaders of the UCLA Bruins baseball program in various categories, including batting average, home runs, runs batted in, runs, hits, stolen bases, ERA, and Strikeouts. Within those areas, the lists identify single-game, single-season, and career leaders. The Bruins represent the University of California, Los Angeles in the NCAA's Big Ten Conference.

UCLA began competing in intercollegiate baseball in 1920. These lists are updated through the end of the 2025 season.

== Batting Average ==
Career
Rk	Player	AVG	Seasons
1	Bill Scott	.392	1998 1999 2000
2	Brian Baron	.376	2000 2001
3	Randy Schwartz	.369	1963 1964
4	Garrett Atkins	.368	1998 1999 2000
5	Eric Karros	.365	1986 1987 1988
6	Alden Carrithers	.364	2007 2008
7	Earl Altshuler	.362	1970 1971 1972
8	Shane Mack	.361	1982 1983 1984
9	John Joslyn	.358	1985 1986
10	Joel Wolfe	.348	1989 1990 1991

Season
Rk	Player	AVG	Season
1	Brian Baron	.443	2001
2	Don Slaught	.428	1979
3	Bill Scott	.421	2000
4	Shane Mack	.419	1983
5	Eric Karros	.415	1988
6	Troy Glaus	.409	1997
7	JT Schwartz	.396	2021
8	Vern Followell	.388	1979
9	Randy Schwartz	.386	1964
10	Garrett Atkins	.383	1998

== Home Runs ==
Career
Rk	Player	HR	Seasons
1	Eric Valent	69	1996 1997 1998
2	Troy Glaus	62	1995 1996 1997
3	Bill Scott	53	1998 1999 2000
	Chase Utley	53	1998 1999 2000
5	Roch Cholowsky	52	2024 2025 2026
6	Torey Lovullo	51	1984 1985 1986 1987
7	Eric Byrnes	48	1995 1996 1997 1998
8	Cody Decker	47	2006 2007 2008 2009
	Ryan McGuire	47	1991 1992 1993
10	Garrett Atkins	40	1998 1999 2000
11	Steve Hisey	39	1984 1985 1986 1987

Season
Rk	Player	HR	Season
1	Troy Glaus	34	1997
2	Eric Valent	30	1998
3	Jim Auten	29	1979
	Paul Ellis	29	1990
5	Jon Heinrichs	28	1997
	Bill Scott	28	1999
7	Eric Valent	27	1997
8	Ryan McGuire	26	1993
9	Torey Lovullo	24	1987
10	Forrest Johnson	23	2000
	Roch Cholowsky	23	2025

Single Game
Rk	Player	HR	Season	Opponent
1	Bill Scott	4	1999	Washington

== Runs Batted In ==
Career
Rk	Player	RBI	Seasons
1	Eric Valent	219	1996 1997 1998
2	Eric Byrnes	203	1995 1996 1997 1998
3	Torey Lovullo	188	1984 1985 1986 1987
4	Ryan McGuire	182	1991 1992 1993
5	Mulivai Levu	181	2024 2025 2026
6	Troy Glaus	180	1995 1996 1997
7	Steve Hisey	176	1984 1985 1986 1987
8	Chase Utley	174	1998 1999 2000
9	Bill Scott	173	1998 1999 2000
10	Lindsay Meggs	168	1981 1982 1983 1984
11	Garrett Atkins	167	1998 1999 2000
	Roch Cholowsky	167	2024 2025 2026

Season
Rk	Player	RBI	Season
1	Troy Glaus	91	1997
	Eric Valent	91	1997
	Ryan McGuire	91	1993
4	Bill Scott	86	1999
5	Mulivai Levu	85	2025
6	Paul Ellis	83	1990
7	Jon Heinrichs	79	1997
	Steve Hisey	79	1987
9	Forrest Johnson	78	2000
	Jim Auten	78	1979

Single Game
Rk	Player	RBI	Season	Opponent
1	Bill Scott	11	1999	Washington

== Runs ==
Career
Rk	Player	R	Seasons
1	Eric Byrnes	235	1995 1996 1997 1998
2	Troy Glaus	211	1995 1996 1997
	Torey Lovullo	211	1984 1985 1986 1987
4	Eric Valent	199	1996 1997 1998
5	Roch Cholowsky	191	2024 2025 2026
6	Jon Heinrichs	186	1994 1995 1996 1997
7	Charlie Fiacco	184	1986 1987 1988 1989
8	Chase Utley	182	1998 1999 2000
	Robbie Katzaroff	182	1987 1988 1989 1990
10	Garrett Atkins	180	1998 1999 2000
11	David Roberts	177	1991 1992 1993 1994

Season
Rk	Player	R	Season
1	Troy Glaus	100	1997
2	Eric Byrnes	95	1997
3	Jon Heinrichs	92	1997
4	Torey Lovullo	83	1987
5	Chase Utley	81	2000
6	Roch Cholowsky	80	2025
7	Bill Scott	75	2000
8	Eric Valent	74	1997
9	Garrett Atkins	73	2000
	Chris Pritchett	73	1990
	Roch Cholowsky	73	2026

== Hits ==
Career
Rk	Player	H	Seasons
1	Eric Byrnes	326	1995 1996 1997 1998
2	Garrett Atkins	276	1998 1999 2000
3	Torey Lovullo	266	1984 1985 1986 1987
4	Robbie Katzaroff	264	1987 1988 1989 1990
5	Chase Utley	256	1998 1999 2000
6	Pete Beall	246	1981 1982 1983 1984
7	Jon Heinrichs	245	1994 1995 1996 1997
8	Brian Graham	243	1979 1980 1981 1982
9	David Roberts	242	1991 1992 1993 1994
10	Troy Glaus	240	1995 1996 1997

Season
Rk	Player	H	Season
1	Bill Scott	112	2000
2	Chase Utley	108	2000
	Troy Glaus	108	1997
4	Jon Heinrichs	107	1997
5	Brian Baron	105	2001
6	Chris Pritchett	102	1990
7	Eric Karros	100	1988
8	Garrett Atkins	96	1999
9	Garrett Atkins	95	2000
10	Eric Valent	93	1997

== Stolen Bases ==
Career
Rk	Player	SB	Seasons
1	David Roberts	109	1991 1992 1993 1994
2	Robbie Katzaroff	96	1987 1988 1989 1990
3	Joel Wolfe	83	1989 1990 1991
4	Eric Byrnes	81	1995 1996 1997 1998
5	David Tokheim	55	1988 1989 1990 1991
	Charlie Fiacco	55	1986 1987 1988 1989
7	Brian Graham	54	1979 1980 1981 1982
8	Jon Heinrichs	52	1994 1995 1996 1997
9	Dave Penniall	48	1975 1976
10	Vince Beringhele	46	1981 1982 1983

Season
Rk	Player	SB	Season
1	David Roberts	45	1994
2	Dave Penniall	38	1976
3	David Roberts	36	1992
	Mike Carpenter	36	1978
5	Joel Wolfe	35	1991
6	Robbie Katzaroff	33	1989
7	Brian Carroll	32	2013
8	Eric Byrnes	30	1998
	Joel Wolfe	30	1990
10	Venoy Garrison	29	1975

== Earned Run Average ==
Career
Rk	Player	ERA	Seasons
1	David Berg	1.11	2012 2013 2014 2015
2	Tim Bottoms	1.81	1961 1962 1963
3	Larry Zeno	1.87	1963 1964
4	Jim York	2.01	1968 1969
	Howard Collins	2.01	1960 1961
6	Ryan Garcia	2.11	2017 2018 2019
7	James Kaprielian	2.06	2013 2014 2015
8	Steve Smith	2.24	1970 1971 1972
	Ron Bruckner	2.24	1960 1961
10	Adam Plutko	2.25	2011 2012 2013

Season
Rk	Player	ERA	Season
1	David Berg	0.68	2015
2	Larry Zeno	0.86	1963
3	Ryan Deeter	0.89	2012
4	David Berg	0.92	2013
5	Tom Pederson	1.24	1963
6	Trevor Bauer	1.25	2011
7	Ryan Garcia	1.44	2019
8	David Berg	1.46	2012
9	Jim York	1.48	1969
	Tim Bottoms	1.48	1962

== Strikeouts ==
Career
Rk	Player	K	Seasons
1	Trevor Bauer	460	2009 2010 2011
2	Gerrit Cole	376	2009 2010 2011
3	Alex Sanchez	328	1985 1986 1987
4	Jim Parque	319	1995 1996 1997
5	Pete Janicki	307	1990 1991 1992
6	Griffin Canning	301	2015 2016 2017
7	James Kaprielian	275	2013 2014 2015
8	Gary Robson	274	1970 1971 1972
9	Adam Plutko	272	2011 2012 2013
10	Jon Brandt	265	1998 1999 2000 2001

Season
Rk	Player	K	Season
1	Trevor Bauer	203	2011
2	Trevor Bauer	165	2010
3	Gerrit Cole	153	2010
4	Pete Janicki	150	1992
5	Alex Sanchez	142	1986
6	Griffin Canning	140	2017
7	Rob Henkel	136	2000
8	Rob Rasmussen	128	2010
9	Gerrit Cole	119	2011
	Jim Parque	119	1997
