= Eric Valent =

American baseball player (born 1977)

- Outfielder
- Born: April 4, 1977 (age 49); La Mirada, California, U.S.
- Batted: Left Threw: Left

Professional debut
- MLB: June 8, 2001, for the Philadelphia Phillies
- NPB: June 19, 2006, for the Tohoku Rakuten Golden Eagles

Last appearance
- MLB: May 27, 2005, for the New York Mets
- NPB: September 5, 2006, for the Tohoku Rakuten Golden Eagles

MLB statistics
- Batting average: .234
- Home runs: 13
- Runs batted in: 37

NPB statistics
- Batting average: .189
- Home runs: 1
- Runs batted in: 5
- Stats at Baseball Reference

Teams
- Philadelphia Phillies (2001–2002); Cincinnati Reds (2003); New York Mets (2004–2005); Tohoku Rakuten Golden Eagles (2006)
Medals
Men's baseball
Representing United States
World Junior Baseball Championship
Gold medal – first place	1995 Massachusetts	Team
World Junior Baseball Championship
Silver medal – second place	1994 Brandon	Team

Eric Christian Valent (born April 4, 1977) is an American former professional baseball outfielder who played in Major League Baseball (MLB) for the Philadelphia Phillies, Cincinnati Reds, and New York Mets. Valent is currently the National Cross Checker in the Miami Marlins organization.

== Playing career ==
=== High school ===
Valent was an All-American at Canyon High School in Anaheim, California. On June 1, 1995, he was drafted in the 26th round of the amateur draft by the Detroit Tigers, but he did not sign and instead elected to attend the University of California, Los Angeles (UCLA).

=== College ===
Valent had a standout career at UCLA, alongside teammates Troy Glaus, Eric Byrnes, Chase Utley, and Garrett Atkins. He helped lead UCLA to the 1997 College World Series.

Valent has the most career home runs in Pac-10 history (69), and is the UCLA career runs batted in (RBI) leader (219), achieved in only three years of play.

Valent was the Pac-10 Player of the year in 1998. On June 2, 1998, he was selected in the first round (42nd overall) of the supplemental draft by the Phillies.

Of his collegiate career, Valent said:

College baseball was fun, but it's a little deceiving because of the aluminum bats. If you hit home runs in college, you aren't necessarily going to hit them as a professional.

In 1996, he played collegiate summer baseball with the Cotuit Kettleers of the wood bat Cape Cod Baseball League.

=== Major leagues ===
On August 31, 2003, Valent was traded to the Cincinnati Reds for catcher Kelly Stinnett.

On December 15, Valent was drafted by the New York Mets in the Rule 5 draft.

Most of Valent's MLB playing time was with the Mets. On July 29, 2004, he became the eighth player in Mets history to hit for the cycle, in a game against the Montreal Expos. In late August, Valent had three pinch-hit home runs. During his days with the Mets, he wore uniform number 57 (later worn by pitcher Johan Santana).

On January 12, 2006, Valent was signed as a free agent by the San Diego Padres, but was released on May 14, after playing in 30 games for their Triple-A farm club, the Portland Beavers.

In a four-season career, Valent was a .234 hitter, with 13 home runs, and 37 RBIs, in 205 games.

== Japanese baseball league ==
After being released from the Padres organization, Valent signed a one-year contract worth 50 million Yen to play right field for the Tohoku Rakuten Golden Eagles in the Pacific League of Nippon Professional Baseball (NPB).

== Coaching ==
In December 2008, Valent was named the hitting coach for the Single-A Williamsport Crosscutters of the Philadelphia Phillies organization, but was reassigned to a scouting position in January 2009.

== See also ==
- List of Major League Baseball players to hit for the cycle

Achievements
Preceded by David Bell	Hitting for the cycle July 29, 2004	Succeeded by Mark Teixeira
