= The Last Crusade (disambiguation) =

Indiana Jones and the Last Crusade is a 1989 American action adventure film.

The Last Crusade may also refer to:

== Film and television ==
- Michael the Brave (film), a 1971 Romanian film also known as The Last Crusade
- Train Man Deluxe: The Last Crusade, a 2006 television special based on the television series Train Man
- "The Last Crusade" (My Little Pony: Friendship Is Magic), a 2019 television episode

== Other media ==
- The Last Crusade (collectible card game), a 1995 collectible card game
- The Dark Knight Returns: The Last Crusade, a 2016 comic book, a prequel to The Dark Knight Returns
- "The Last Crusade", a song from the 2011 album Collider by Sam Roberts

== History ==
- Crimea: The Last Crusade, a 2010 book by Orlando Figes
- The Last Crusade: Spain 1936, a 1996 book by Warren H. Carroll
- The historical last Crusades, see Fall of Outremer

== See also ==
- Indiana Jones and the Last Crusade (disambiguation)
- Our Last Crusade or the Rise of a New World
