= UCLA Bruins baseball =

Baseball team representing the University of California, Los Angeles

- 2027 UCLA Bruins baseball team
- Founded: 1920 (106 years ago)
- University: University of California, Los Angeles
- Head coach: John Savage (22nd season)
- Conference: Big Ten
- Location: Los Angeles, California
- Home stadium: Jackie Robinson Stadium
- Nickname: Bruins
- Colors: Blue and gold

College World Series champions
- 2013

College World Series runner-up
- 2010

College World Series appearances
- 1969, 1997, 2010, 2012, 2013, 2025

NCAA regional champions
- 1997, 2000, 2007, 2010, 2012, 2013, 2019, 2025

NCAA tournament appearances
- 1969, 1979, 1986, 1987, 1990, 1992, 1993, 1996, 1997, 1999, 2000, 2004, 2006, 2007, 2008, 2010, 2011, 2012, 2013, 2015, 2017, 2018, 2019, 2021, 2022, 2025, 2026

Conference tournament champions
- Big 10: 2026

Conference regular season champions
- Pac-10/12: 1944, 1969, 1976, 1979, 1986, 2000, 2011, 2012, 2015, 2019; Big 10: 2025, 2026

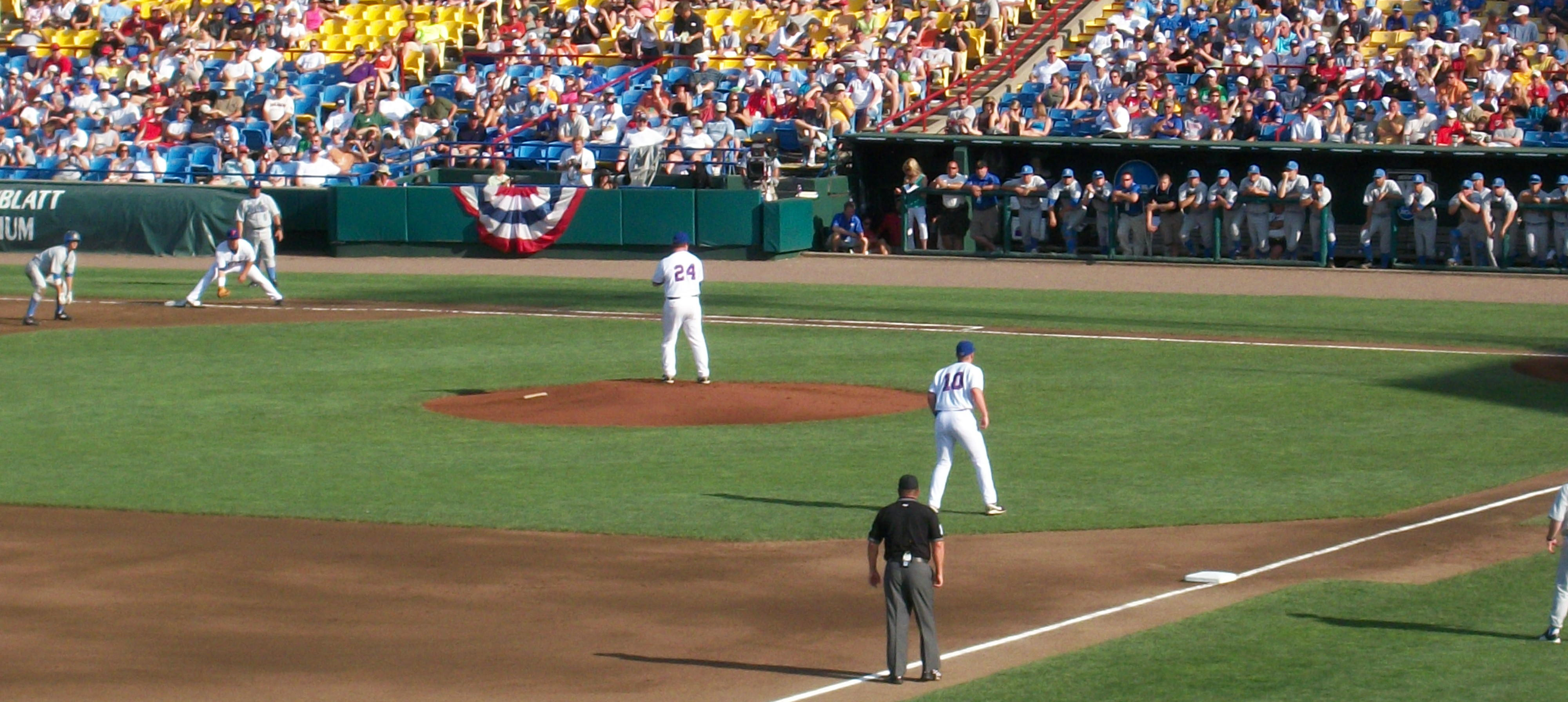
UCLA vs. Florida at 2010 CWS

The UCLA Bruins baseball team is the varsity college baseball team of the University of California, Los Angeles. Having started playing in 1920, the program is a member of the NCAA Division I Big Ten Conference. It plays its home games at Jackie Robinson Stadium. The program has appeared in six College World Series and won the 2013 National Championship.

== History ==
=== 1969 season ===
Chris Chambliss led the Bruins to the 1969 CWS, UCLA's first. The team defeated Santa Clara at the NCAA Regional and finished in 7th place, after losing to Tulsa, 6–5 in 10 innings, and to Arizona State, 2–1 in 12 innings. Chambliss, who went on to play for Major League Baseball's Cleveland Indians, New York Yankees, and Atlanta Braves between 1971 and 1986, had a team-high .340 batting average and 15 home runs. Other members of the team included Bill Bonham, Mike Reinbach, and Jim York.

=== 1997 season ===
The 1997 team won the Pac-10 title with a 43–18 record (21–9 Pac-10) and reached in the CWS. The team was led by head coach Gary Adams and included future Major League Baseball players Troy Glaus, Jim Parque, and Eric Byrnes. Jon Heinrichs, Tom Jacquez, Eric Valent, and Peter Zamora also played on the team. During the season, UCLA held a number one ranking, and the team finished the season ranked sixth.

At the NCAA tournament Midwest Regional in Stillwater, Oklahoma, the Bruins lost the first game to Harvard, but won the next four games, against Ohio, Tennessee, Harvard, and Oklahoma State, in order to advance to the College World Series.

At the College World Series, UCLA struggled with poor pitching and defense and lost its first game to Miami, 7–3 (12 innings), and was eliminated by Mississippi State, 7–5, in their second game.

=== 2010 season ===
The Bruins finished the 2010 season with a 43–13 record and were selected to host the Los Angeles Regional of the 2010 NCAA tournament at Jackie Robinson Stadium. The team won the regional by defeating its other three teams, UC Irvine (39–17), Kent State (39–23), and defending national champions LSU (40–20). The Bruins advanced to the Super Regional round, in which they defeated Cal State Fullerton.

The team became UCLA's first to win a College World Series game, defeating Florida in the first game, 11–3. The Bruins then defeated TCU twice to advance to the National Championship Series.

The Bruins lost both games to South Carolina in the CWS Championship Series to finish as national runners-up. The team was ranked No. 1 in an April Baseball America poll. Cody Regis, Beau Amaral, and Trevor Bauer were named to the All-College World Series Team. Rob Rasmussen was among ten players from the 2010 team that were selected in the 2010 MLB draft.

=== 2012 season ===
With a 42–14 record, the Bruins hosted the Los Angeles Regional of the NCAA tournament at Jackie Robinsion Stadium and defeated Creighton and New Mexico to advance to the Super Regional. The Bruins then defeated TCU to advance to the College World Series. At the College World Series, UCLA defeated Stony Brook, but was eliminated with losses to Arizona and Florida State.

=== 2013 season ===
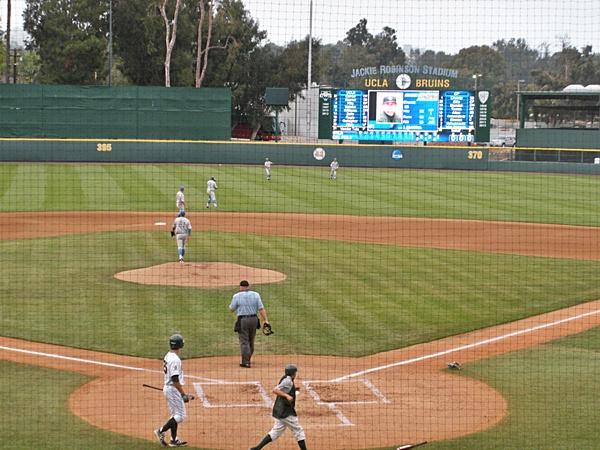
UCLA Bruins playing at the L.A. Regional at Jackie Robinson Stadium on June 1, 2013

Following a 39–17 regular season record and third-place finish in the Pac-12, UCLA was selected to host a regional in the 2013 NCAA tournament. In it, UCLA defeated Cal Poly, San Diego, and San Diego State to advance to the Super Regional. In the Fullerton Super Regional, UCLA defeated top ranked Cal State Fullerton, 5–3 (in extra innings) and 3–0, advance to the College World Series for the third time in four seasons.

UCLA advanced to the 2013 College World Series and faced Mississippi State in a best-of-three final, having defeating the number one national seed North Carolina, 4–1, in the final game of the preliminary round. The Bruins won the first game, 3–1. They won the second game, 8–0, to win the program's first national championship. The team's pitching staff, including starters Adam Plutko, Nick Vander Tuig, and Grant Watson, and relievers James Kaprielian, Zack Weiss, and David Berg, gave up only four runs in five games at the World Series. The Bruins became the first team to win the World Series without hitting a home run during the tournament since Ohio State did in 1966.

== USA National Team ==
Nine players from UCLA have played for the USA Collegiate National teams: Trevor Bauer, Gerrit Cole, Brandon Crawford, Josh Karp, Bill Scott, Jon Brandt, Eric Valent, Jim Parque, Troy Glaus, and Shane Mack, Jon Olsen.

Cole and catcher Steve Rodriguez were named to the 2010 USA Collegiate National Team. Cole was one of three veterans returning from the 2009 National Team.

== Notable alumni ==
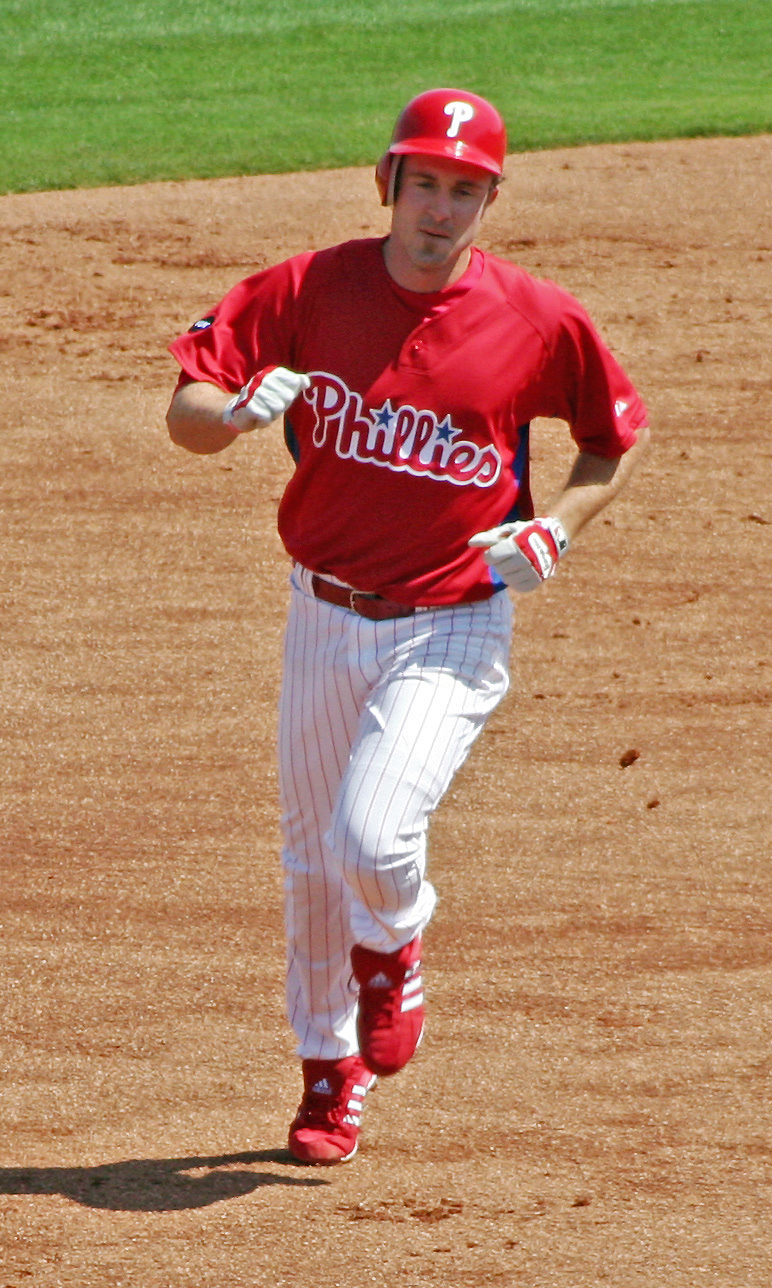
Chase Utley

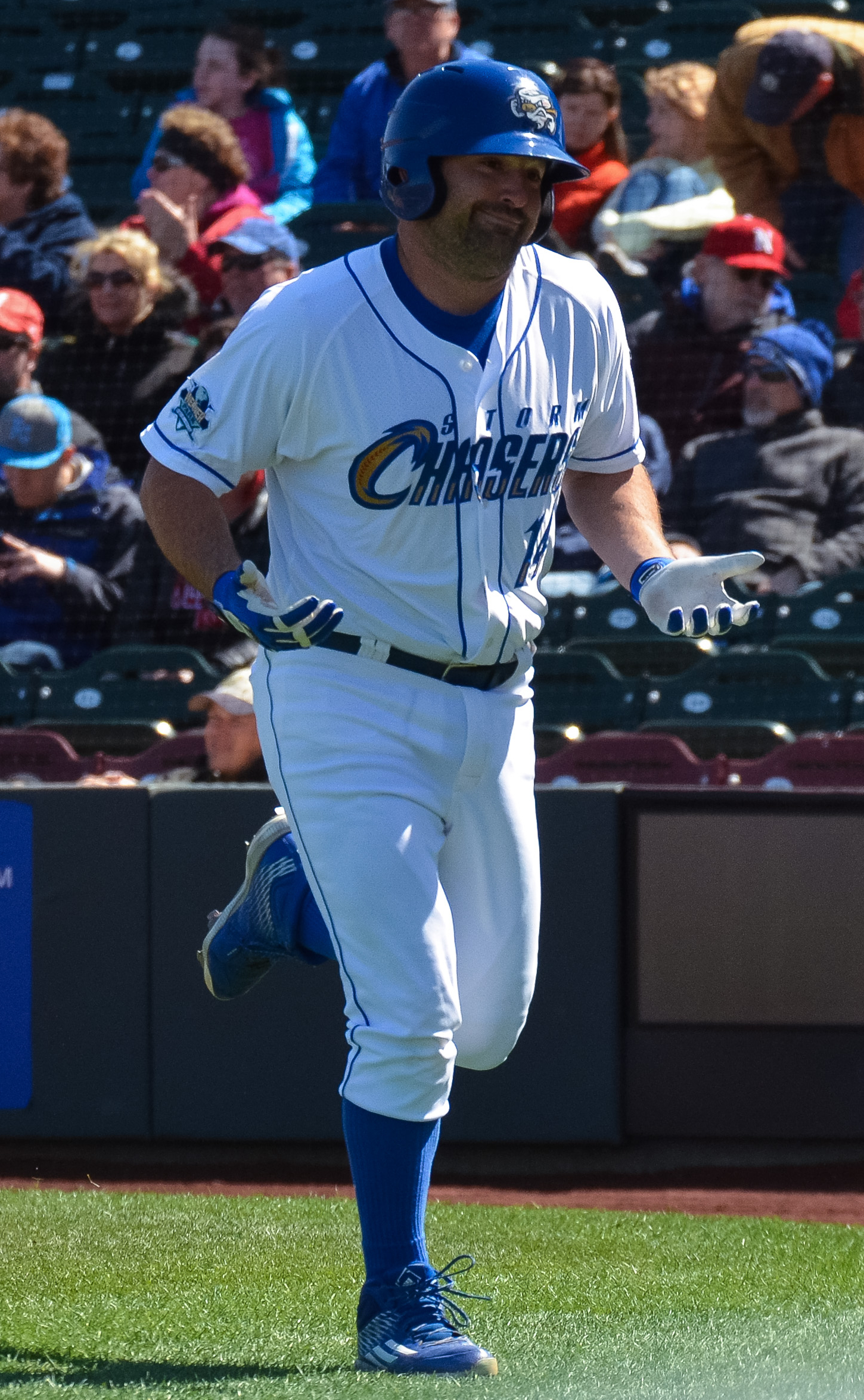
Cody Decker

101 former Bruins have competed in the major leagues, including the following players:

- Garrett Atkins – Colorado Rockies, Baltimore Orioles
- Trevor Bauer – Arizona Diamondbacks, Cleveland Indians, Cincinnati Reds, Los Angeles Dodgers
- Jake Bird (born 1995) - Colorado Rockies
- Eric Byrnes – five teams
- Chris Chambliss – Cleveland Indians, New York Yankees, Atlanta Braves
- Pat Clements - Pittsburgh Pirates, New York Yankees
- Gerrit Cole – Pittsburgh Pirates, Houston Astros, New York Yankees
- Dick Conger - Detroit Tigers, Pittsburgh Pirates, and Philadelphia Phillies
- Jeff Conine – Florida Marlins, five other teams
- Brandon Crawford – San Francisco Giants
- Cody Decker – San Diego Padres
- Ben Francisco – six teams
- Troy Glaus – Anaheim Angels, four other teams, 2002 World Series MVP
- Luis Gomez – Minnesota Twins, Toronto Blue Jays, Atlanta Braves
- David Huff – five teams
- Casey Janssen – Toronto Blue Jays, Washington Nationals
- Eric Karros – Los Angeles Dodgers, Chicago Cubs, Oakland Athletics
- Tim Leary – seven teams
- Adam Melhuse – Los Angeles Dodgers, Colorado Rockies, Oakland Athletics, Texas Rangers
- Jim Parque – Chicago White Sox, Tampa Bay Devil Rays
- Dave Roberts – five teams, and Los Angeles Dodgers manager (2016–present)
- Jackie Robinson – Brooklyn Dodgers
- Josh Roenicke – Cincinnati Reds, Toronto Blue Jays, Colorado Rockies, Minnesota Twins
- Ron Roenicke – six teams, Milwaukee Brewers manager from 2011 to 2015
- Chase Utley – Philadelphia Phillies, Los Angeles Dodgers
- Eric Valent – Philadelphia Phillies, Cincinnati Reds, New York Mets
- Jim York – Kansas City Royals, Houston Astros, New York Yankees

== Head coaches ==
- Fred W. Cozens (1920–1924)
- Caddy Works (1925–1926)
- A. J. Sturzenegger (1927–1931, 1933, 1943–1945)
- Alvin Montgomery (1932)
- Jack Fournier (1934–1936)
- Bill James (1936) (James coached last 19 games of 1936 season)
- Marty Krug (1937–1939)
- John Schaeffer (1940)
- Art Reichle (1941, 1946–1974)
- Lowell McGinnis (1942)
- Gary Adams (1975–2004)
- John Savage (2005–present)

== See also ==
- List of NCAA Division I baseball programs
