= Bleacher Creatures (toys) =

American toy company

Bleacher Creatures (founded 2011) is an American company producing plush figures of licensed personalities from sports and entertainment. The company has produced toys of over 1000 different figures, and also produces wigs, masks, and capes with licensed logos.

The company was founded in Blue Bell, Pennsylvania in the year 2011 by Matthew Hoffman, a sports-licensed industry veteran, beginning with licensed plush likenesses of famous athletes marketed for children. Bleacher Creatures first player that they released was a 14 in (360 mm) version of Philadelphia Phillies second baseman Chase Utley.

The company holds licensing deals with companies including the National Football League, National Basketball Association, World Wrestling Entertainment, Marvel Comics, DC Comics, Warner Brothers, and MGM Studios. As of 2016 they were selling more than 1 million dolls a year. In 2018 they were acquired by Uncanny Brands, with the Bleacher Creatures name continuing to be used.
