= Saffron Henderson =

Canadian voice actress

- Born: September 25, 1965 (age 60); Vancouver, British Columbia, Canada
- Occupations: Voice actress; singer
- Years active: 1979–present
- Spouse: Chris Pritchett (m. 2001)
- Children: 2
- Father: Bill Henderson
- Relatives: Camille Henderson (sister)

Saffron Henderson (born September 25, 1965) is a Canadian voice actress, actress and singer. She has often worked with Ocean Productions in numerous anime dubs.

== Early life, family and education ==
Saffron Henderson was born in Vancouver, British Columbia, Canada, a daughter of Canadian musician Bill Henderson, the lead guitarist and singer of the Canadian rock band Chilliwack. Her sister is singer Camille Henderson.

She recalled in an interview that she worked as a showgirl in Spain when she was seventeen years old.

== Career ==
Henderson tends to be cast as mature and flirtatious women, young boys and teenage girls, as well as foreign women and motherly figures. Her best known roles are Kid Goku and Kid Gohan in Dragon Ball and Dragon Ball Z, Shenhua in Black Lagoon, Sachiko Yagami in Death Note, Lucrezia Noin in Gundam Wing and Oxnard in Hamtaro. Henderson has acted in live-action roles, as well. She makes a brief appearance in The Fly II as Veronica Quaife (replacing Geena Davis who had starred in the first film), the romantic comedy Cousins as Terri Costello, and Friday the 13th Part VIII: Jason Takes Manhattan as rocker J.J. who is killed by Jason Voorhees with her own guitar.

Henderson has performed backing vocals on several albums, including for ex Free/Bad Company vocalist Paul Rodgers' 2000 album Electric. She is also an instructor for the On the Mic Training voice-over training school in Vancouver.

== Personal life ==
Henderson has stated that, if she weren't an actress, she would have been a psychologist in order to help people with diabetes, from which she suffers. She has mentioned Peter Sellers as an influence.

Henderson married Chris Pritchett, a professional baseball player, in 2001. They have two sons.

== Voice roles ==
- .hack//Roots – Midori
- A Christmas Adventure... From a Book Called Wisely's Tales – Rachael, Cupid
- Adventures from the Book of Virtues – Julie
- Animated Classic Showcase – Various Characters
- Barbie Fairytopia: Magic of the Rainbow – Lumina
- Billy the Cat – Nelson
- Black Lagoon series – Shenhua, Frederica Sawyer/Sawyer the Cleaner, Mami
- Brandy & Mr. Whiskers – Additional Voices
- Cardcaptors – Vicky (episode 14)
- Class of the Titans – Padma
- Death Note – Sachiko Yagami
- Dragon Ball (BLT Productions/FUNimation dub) – Goku (episodes 1–13 and movie 1)
- Dragon Ball Z (FUNimation/Saban Entertainment dub) – Gohan (episodes 1–67 (edited into 53 episodes) and movie 3 (edited into 3 episodes))
- Dragon Ball Z (FUNimation/Pioneer dub) – Gohan (movies 1–3)
- Dragon Ball Z (Westwood Media/AB Groupe dub) – Gohan (episodes 123–165/edited 108-150)
- Dragon Ball Z Kai (Ocean Productions dub) – Gohan
- Fat Dog Mendoza – Gothic Girl, Cissy Poole
- Galaxy Express 999 (movie) – Tetsuro Hoshino
- Ghost in the Shell: Stand Alone Complex – The Laughing Man – Kurutan
- Adieu Galaxy Express 999 – Tetsuro Hoshino
- Generation O! – Baby Powder
- The Girl Who Leapt Through Time – Kazuko Yoshiyama
- G.I. Joe Extreme – Additional Voices
- Greatest Heroes and Legends of the Bible — Simon
- Hamtaro – Oxnard, Maria
- Holly Hobbie & Friends: Fabulous Fashion Show - Joan Hobbie
- Holly Hobbie & Friends: Marvelous Makeover - Joan Hobbie
- Inuyasha – Sōta Higurashi, Eri (First voices, later replaced with Rebecca Shoichet)
- Inuyasha the Movie: Affections Touching Across Time – Sōta Higurashi, Eri
- Inuyasha the Movie: The Castle Beyond the Looking Glass – Sōta Higurashi, Eri
- Joon Joon and Friends – King Pow, Josh Josh, Hannah Tatsuma
- Key the Metal Idol – Miho Utsuse, Beniko Komori
- Kleo the Misfit Unicorn
- Kong: The Animated Series – Lua
- Maison Ikkoku – Kentaro Ichinose
- Master Keaton – Natalya
- MegaMan NT Warrior – Manuela
- Mobile Suit Gundam: Encounters in Space – Yuki Nakasato
- Mobile Suit Gundam SEED – Aisha
- Mobile Suit Gundam Wing – Lucrezia Noin
- Monster Rancher – Pixie/Granity, Sandra, Eared Mew, Pink Suezo, Furred Suezo
- My Little Pony: Dancing in the Clouds – Sky Wishes
- My Little Pony: Friends Are Never Far Away – Sky Wishes
- My Little Pony: Friendship Is Magic – Auntie Lofty ("The Last Crusade"), Teddie Safari ("Trade Ya!")
- My Scene Goes Hollywood – Audra
- Naruto – Kurenai Yuhi (Episode 3, later replaced with Mary Elizabeth McGlynn)
- Nana – Junko Saotome
- Nicktoons: Battle for Volcano Island – Queen of the Myrmecs, Crab Follower #1, Crab Refugee #1, Crab Refugee #3
- Nilus the Sandman – Polly, Sugar
- Ninja Turtles: The Next Mutation – Vam-Mi
- Pocket Dragon Adventures – Princess Betty Bye Bell
- Powerpuff Girls Z – Brandy
- Ranma ½ – Tsubasa Kurenai, Kogane Musashi, additional voices
- RoboCop: Alpha Commando – Kudzu Bodine
- Roswell Conspiracies: Aliens, Myths and Legends – Nema Perrera
- Saber Marionette J – Edge, Bloodberry
- Sabrina: The Animated Series – Additional Voices
- Sherlock Holmes in the 22nd Century – Lois St. Clair
- Street Fighter – Sakura
- Tara Duncan: The Evil Empress – Tara Duncan
- The Adventures of Corduroy
- The Deep – Agnes De-Krester
- The Little Prince – Ilnios (The Planet of Bubble Gob)
- The Vision of Escaflowne – Yukari Uchida, Eriya, Celena Schezar, Naria (Bandai Entertainment dub)
- Troll Tales – Rude
- Trouble Chocolate – Almond, Green Tea
- Ultimate Book of Spells – Additional Voices
- Walter Melon – Additional Voices
- What About Mimi? – Mary Beth, Mrs. Grindstone
- World Trigger – Yōtarō Rindō, Yuu Kunichika
- X-Men: Evolution – Callisto
- Zatch Bell! – Sherry Belmont (episodes 1–85)
- Zatch Bell! Mamodo Battles – Sherry Belmont
- Zatch Bell! Mamodo Fury – Sherry Belmont
- Zoids: New Century – Naomi Fluegel

== Singing roles ==
- Poison Ivy: The New Seduction (1997 / closing credits)
- Rainbow Fish (2000 / backing vocals, main title)
- The Bitsy Bears (1992 / main title)
- Simon (singing voice)
