= Indiana Jones and the Last Crusade (disambiguation) =

Indiana Jones and the Last Crusade is a 1989 film directed by Steven Spielberg.

Indiana Jones and the Last Crusade may also refer to:

- Indiana Jones and the Last Crusade (soundtrack), the soundtrack to the 1989 film
- Indiana Jones and the Last Crusade (1991 video game), for the NES
- Indiana Jones and the Last Crusade: The Action Game, 1989
- Indiana Jones and the Last Crusade: The Graphic Adventure, 1989

== See also ==
- Indiana Jones (disambiguation)
- The Last Crusade (disambiguation)
