= Aunt Holiday and Auntie Lofty =

Fictional characters from My Little Pony

- My Little Pony characters
- Aunt Holiday (left) and Auntie Lofty (right) as they appear in "The Last Crusade"
- First appearance: "The Last Crusade" (2019)
- Created by: Nicole Dubuc; Michael Vogel
- Voiced by: Jackie Blackmore (Aunt Holiday); Saffron Henderson (Auntie Lofty)

In-universe information
- Species: Earth Pony (Aunt Holiday); Pegasus (Auntie Lofty)
- Spouse: Each other
- Relatives: Snap Shutter (brother and brother-in-law); Mane Allgood (sister-in-law); Scootaloo (niece)

Aunt Holiday and Auntie Lofty are fictional characters who appear in the fourth incarnation of Hasbro's My Little Pony toyline and media franchise, specifically in My Little Pony: Friendship Is Magic (2010–2019). They are voiced by Jackie Blackmore and Saffron Henderson, respectively. As Scootaloo's aunts and legal guardians, Aunt Holiday and Auntie Lofty are the first explicitly LGBT couple to appear in the series.

== Appearances ==
=== Fourth My Little Pony incarnation (2010–2019) ===
==== My Little Pony: Friendship Is Magic ====
Aunt Holiday and Auntie Lofty make their debut in the ninth-season episode "The Last Crusade", where they are revealed to be Scootaloo's aunts and primary caregivers.

== Development ==
They're just showing the love between these two ponies and declaring their life by representing it and just having it be normal. I like the way that they did it. I think that's more powerful in the long run, because it is just about humans being humans and making their own choices and loving who they love. I think that's how it should be represented more, so that we get used to it and it's a more regular thing.

— Jackie Blackmore, CityNews Calgary

The inclusion of Aunt Holiday and Auntie Lofty as an LGBT couple was the result of collaboration between writer and producer Michael Vogel and showrunner Nicole Dubuc. According to Vogel, the characters first appeared in a book before their animated debut, and the development process began with getting them approved for that initial publication. Vogel told BuzzFeed News that he and Dubuc "thought this was a great opportunity to organically introduce an LGBTQ couple in the series," and they approached Hasbro, which approved the inclusion. Vogel, who is gay, reported that the decision was especially meaningful to him, as he felt it was important for the show to reflect the real world. Dubuc stated that the inclusion demonstrated "what truly defines a family is love," which she considered core to the My Little Pony message. Vogel further noted that My Little Pony "has always been about friendship and accepting people (or ponies) that are different from you."

The characters had previously appeared in the 2017 book Ponyville Mysteries: Riddle of the Rusty Horseshoe, where Vogel—one of the authors of the book—first confirmed their relationship. The episode resolved a long-standing mystery about Scootaloo's family situation, as the character had never mentioned her parents, aunts, or any other family members throughout the show's nine seasons.

== Reception ==
The announcement of Aunt Holiday and Auntie Lofty generated widespread media attention when writer Michael Vogel confirmed their romantic relationship on Twitter, calling them "a cute couple." According to CBS News, the inclusion followed the addition of a same-sex marriage in the children's show Arthur the previous month in the episode "Mr. Ratburn and the Special Someone".

According to Yahoo!, "many [...] have commended the show for its inclusivity." Romper listed Friendship Is Magic one of the "20 Amazing Shows With LGBTQ+ Characters To Watch With Your Kids" because of Aunt Holiday and Auntie Lofty. Similarly, The Globe and Mail featured the show as one of its parents' picks in "family programs that showcase LGBTQ+ representation". According to Jackie Blackmore, who voices Aunt Holiday, she has received an "explosion of love" from fans, including being given artworks.

According to Australian LGBT online magazine OutInPerth, the episode's inclusion of a same-sex couple upset conservative voices, with Lyle Shelton, then spokesperson for the Australian Conservatives, claiming that the characters were proof that allowing same-sex marriage would lead to children being "indoctrinated." On Twitter, he stated: "It's a brave new world folks & we need to push back while we can. Sitting outside politics is no longer an option for conservatives." Kirralie Smith, head of anti-transgender organization Binary, posted images of the characters with the message "They are coming for your kids..." Despite the backlash, the series would later introduce additional LGBTQ characters in subsequent episodes (Lyra Heartstrings and Bon Bon).

== See also ==
- List of My Little Pony: Friendship Is Magic characters
- LGBT representation in children's television
- My Little Pony: Friendship Is Magic fandom
