= Indiana Jones and the Temple of Doom (disambiguation) =

Indiana Jones and the Temple of Doom is a 1984 action-adventure film featuring the character Indiana Jones.

Indiana Jones and the Temple of Doom may also refer to:

- Indiana Jones and the Temple of Doom (soundtrack), the film's soundtrack
- Indiana Jones and the Temple of Doom (1985 video game), an arcade game based on the film
- Indiana Jones and the Temple of Doom (1988 video game), a video game based on the film for the Nintendo Entertainment System
- Indiana Jones and the Temple of Doom Adventure Pack, an expansion for The Adventures of Indiana Jones Role-Playing Game

== See also ==
- Indiana Jones (disambiguation)
