= Indiana Jones (disambiguation) =

Indiana Jones is an American media franchise.

Indiana Jones may also refer to:

- Indiana Jones (character), the title character of the media franchise
- Indiana Jones (comics), comics featuring the character
- Indiana Jones: The Pinball Adventure, a pinball machine featuring the character
- Daniel Jones, American football player nicknamed "Indiana Jones"

== See also ==
- Indiana Jones and the Last Crusade (disambiguation)
- Indiana Jones and the Temple of Doom (disambiguation)
- Raiders of the Lost Ark (disambiguation)
- Indiana (disambiguation)
- Jones (disambiguation)
