= Lost Ark =

Lost Ark may refer to:

- The Ark of the Covenant, a religious artifact considered lost
- Noah's Ark, as described in some searches for Noah's Ark
- Lost Ark (video game), 2019 video game

== See also ==
- Raiders of the Lost Ark (disambiguation)
- Lost Ark Dreaming
