= Raiders of the Lost Ark (disambiguation) =

Raiders of the Lost Ark is a 1981 adventure film in the Indiana Jones franchise.

Raiders of the Lost Ark may also refer to:

- Raiders of the Lost Ark (soundtrack), the soundtrack to the film
- Raiders of the Lost Ark (video game), a 1982 video game based on the film
- Raiders of the Lost Ark: The Adaptation, a 1989 fan film
- Raiders of the Lost Ark Adventure Pack, an expansion for The Adventures of Indiana Jones Role-Playing Game

== See also ==
- Indiana Jones (disambiguation)
- Lost Ark (disambiguation)
