= Ryan McGuire =

American baseball player (born 1971)

- First baseman / Outfielder
- Born: November 23, 1971 (age 53); Bellflower, California, U.S.
- Batted: Left Threw: Left

MLB debut
- June 5, 1997, for the Montreal Expos

Last MLB appearance
- July 14, 2002, for the Baltimore Orioles

MLB statistics
- Batting average: .211
- Home runs: 7
- Runs batted in: 55
- Stats at Baseball Reference

Teams
- Montreal Expos (1997–1999); New York Mets (2000); Florida Marlins (2001); Baltimore Orioles (2002)

Ryan Byron McGuire (born November 23, 1971) is an American former professional baseball player. He played six seasons in Major League Baseball, from 1997–2002, as a first baseman and outfielder. In his MLB career, he played for the Montreal Expos, New York Mets, Florida Marlins, and Baltimore Orioles.
