= Chris Pritchett =

American baseball player (born 1970)

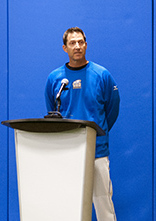
- First baseman
- Born: January 31, 1970 (age 55); Merced, California, U.S.
- Batted: Left Threw: Right

MLB debut
- September 6, 1996, for the California Angels

Last MLB appearance
- May 23, 2000, for the Philadelphia Phillies

MLB statistics
- Batting average: .221
- Home runs: 3
- RBI: 11
- Stats at Baseball Reference

Teams
- California/Anaheim Angels (1996, 1998–1999); Philadelphia Phillies (2000)

Christopher Davis Pritchett (born January 31, 1970) is an American former Major League Baseball (MLB) first baseman who played for the California/Anaheim Angels and Philadelphia Phillies between 1996 and 2000, and is currently a college baseball coach for the UBC Thunderbirds.

== Amateur career ==
A native of Merced, California, Pritchett graduated from Central Catholic High School (Modesto, California) and is an alumnus of the University of California, Los Angeles. In 1990, he played collegiate summer baseball with the Harwich Mariners of the Cape Cod Baseball League.

== Professional career ==
Drafted by the California Angels in the second round of the 1991 Major League Baseball draft, Pritchett made his Major League Baseball debut with the California Angels on September 6, 1996, and appeared in his final game on May 23, 2000.

== Scouting and coaching career ==
Following his playing career, Pritchett was an international scout for the Boston Red Sox of Major League Baseball, assigned to Canada.

In 2015 he became the head coach of the UBC Thunderbirds baseball team, which competes in the National Association of Intercollegiate Athletics.

== Personal ==
Pritchett has been married to Canadian voice actress and singer Saffron Henderson since 2001.
