= Trade Ya! =

- My Little Pony: Friendship Is Magic episode
- Episode no.: Season 4 Episode 22
- Written by: Scott Sonneborn
- Original air date: April 19, 2014
- Running time: 22 minutes

Episode chronology
← Previous "Testing Testing 1, 2, 3"	Next → "Inspiration Manifestation"
- My Little Pony: Friendship Is Magic season 4

"Trade Ya!" is the twenty-second episode of the fourth season of the animated television series My Little Pony: Friendship Is Magic. The episode was written by Scott Sonneborn. It originally aired on The Hub on April 19, 2014. In this episode, the Mane Six attend the Rainbow Falls Traders Exchange.

== Plot ==
The Mane Six arrive at the Rainbow Falls Traders Exchange with various trading goals: Rainbow Dash seeks a first-edition Daring Do book, Spike wants to trade comics, Fluttershy needs a bird whistle, and Applejack and Rarity hunt for vintage items. Rainbow discovers the book she wants but only has a horseshoe to trade, which the Daring Do collector rejects in favor of an orthros from an ancient beast dealer. This sets Rainbow and Fluttershy on a chain of trades involving Discord-shaped lamps, antique chickens, and crystal chalices, with each trader demanding something different.

Meanwhile, Applejack and Rarity argue over their conflicting vintage purchases—a dented pie tin and an expensive brooch, respectively—with each insisting the other should get what they want to prove who's the better friend. Pinkie Pie prevents Twilight from trading all her books for a young filly's broken quill, then sets up a promotional booth marketing Twilight's books as "official princess merchandise," drawing huge crowds but making Twilight uncomfortable.

Rainbow and Fluttershy race against the exchange's sunset deadline, including waiting for Stellar Eclipse to finish his lunch break and helping speed up an oat burger line. When they finally reach the orthros dealer, Fluttershy loses her bear call while clearing a crowd, and upon reaching the Daring Do collector, they discover she no longer wants it. The collector agrees to trade only if Fluttershy stays in Manehattan for months to train the orthros, and Rainbow eagerly accepts the deal before realizing she has essentially traded away her friend.

Rainbow rushes to Twilight and requests an official ruling on the trade's validity. Rainbow argues that no possession is worth more than a friend, moving the Daring Do collector to tears, and she agrees to cancel the arrangement. The friends return to Ponyville, and Twilight gives Rainbow her old paperback copy of the Daring Do book.

== Reception ==
Sherilyn Connelly, the author of Ponyville Confidential, gave the episode a "B+" rating and used it as an example of an episode that did not feature adventure elements as a rebuttal to the notion that "nearly all" episodes are adventure stories.

In a critical analysis of the episode, author Jen A. Blue described "Trade Ya!" as "one of the more structurally complex episodes of the series" with full A, B, C, and D plots and wrote that while it initially appears to be a farce, it lacks the typical farcical climactic collapse and instead becomes "an examination of desire and value." Blue analyzed how the episode demonstrates that value is subjective, arbitrary, and changeable through various trading scenarios, from Rainbow Dash's lucky horseshoe to Rarity and Applejack's conflict over absurd items. Blue argued that the show depicts how "the objects desired by various ponies don't have value of their own, but have it placed into them by other ponies" and noted that this challenges the show's premise about depicting the value of friendship, but concluded that the episode ultimately argues that "value is intangible, and therefore only intangible phenomena have value," with Rainbow Dash's friendship with Fluttershy being the prime example. Blue wrote that while the episode shows material objects' value as constructed, it does not make the show dishonest about friendship's value because "value is not just individually constructed, but also socially constructed".

Daniel Alvarez of Unleash The Fanboy gave the episode a rating of 5 out of 10 and called it "the weakest episode of Season 4, and the show in general," criticizing Scott Sonneborn's writing and arguing that most characters were badly written and acted like "parody versions of themselves." He praised the message that friends are worth more than material possessions but felt the episode was "a sea of mediocrity to get to that message." Jamie Kingston of WomenWriteAboutComics praised the episode's inclusion of ponies with disabilities.

Ryan Meitzler of DualShockers called the Easter egg cameo of ponified version of Robert and Rosalind Lutece from Bioshock Infinite as "very special".

== See also ==
- List of My Little Pony: Friendship Is Magic episodes
