= Eric Byrnes =

American baseball player (born 1976)

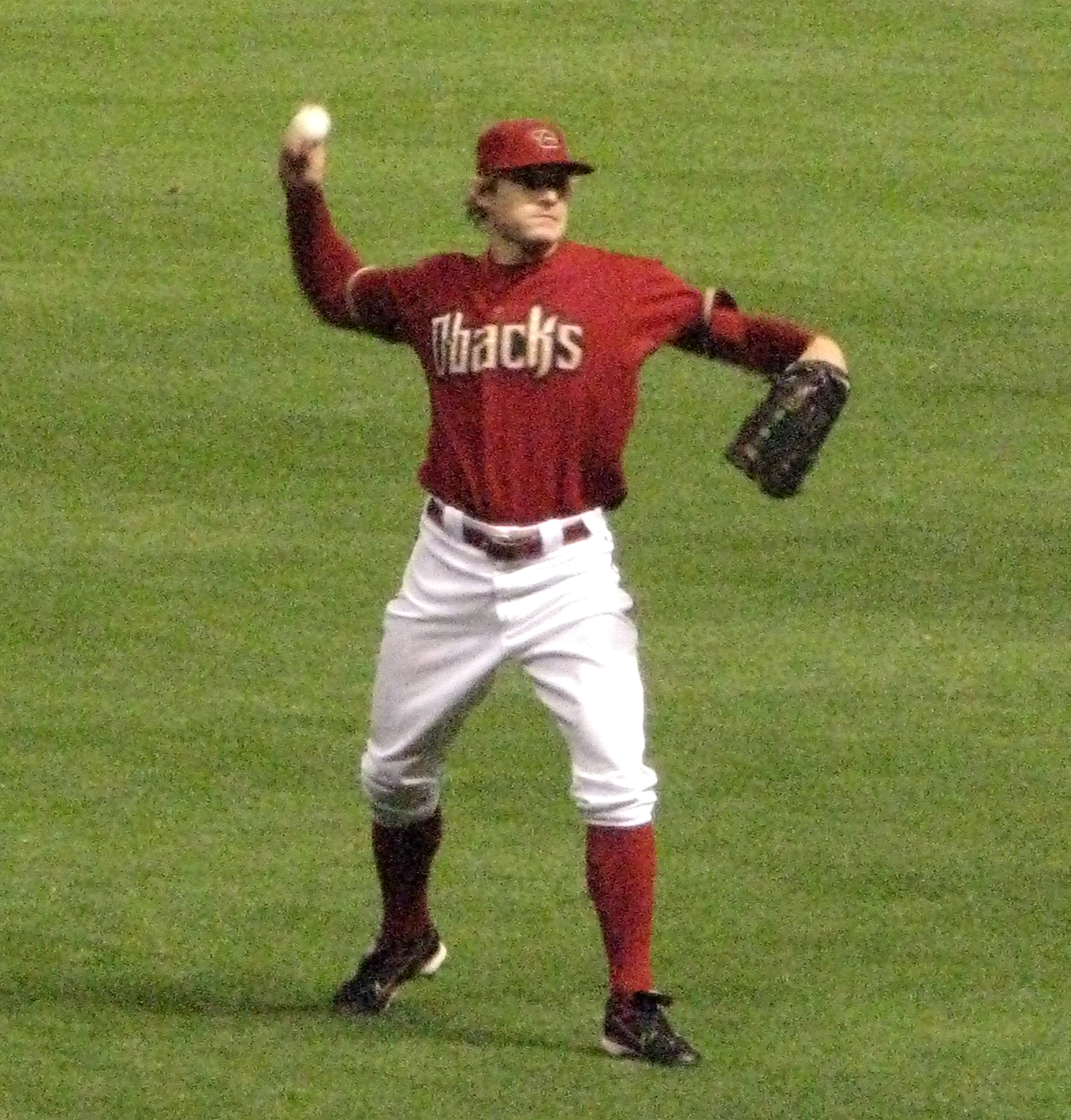
- Byrnes with the Arizona Diamondbacks
- Outfielder
- Born: February 16, 1976 (age 50); Redwood City, California, U.S.
- Batted: Right Threw: Right

MLB debut
- August 22, 2000, for the Oakland Athletics

Last MLB appearance
- May 2, 2010, for the Seattle Mariners

MLB statistics
- Batting average: .258
- Home runs: 109
- Runs batted in: 396
- Stats at Baseball Reference

Teams
- Oakland Athletics (2000–2005); Colorado Rockies (2005); Baltimore Orioles (2005); Arizona Diamondbacks (2006–2009); Seattle Mariners (2010)

Eric James Byrnes (born February 16, 1976), is an American baseball analyst and former outfielder. He played in Major League Baseball (MLB) for the Oakland Athletics, Colorado Rockies, Baltimore Orioles, Arizona Diamondbacks, and Seattle Mariners. Byrnes retired from playing in 2010 and was an analyst for MLB Network until 2021.

Byrnes was considered to be a player who relied on his speed and hustle. He could hit for power, but tended to be a "free-swinger" and went through hitting droughts. Byrnes was ranked in the top-three for best defensive left fielders in John Dewan's publication, Fielding Bible. Byrnes was selected to the All-Time great Oakland A's 50th Season team in 2018.

== Early life ==
Byrnes's high school career was spent in the West Catholic Athletic League, where he played for St. Francis High School in Mountain View, California. Byrnes regularly competed in baseball and football against Serra High School's Tom Brady, and Bellarmine College Prep's Pat Burrell. After graduating in 1994, he was selected in the 1994 Major League Baseball (MLB) draft by the Los Angeles Dodgers but elected to go to college at the University of California at Los Angeles (UCLA).

== College career ==
At UCLA (1995–98), Byrnes hit second in the batting order and played right field in a lineup that featured future major leaguers Troy Glaus (1995–97) and Garrett Atkins (1998). In 1995, Byrnes played collegiate summer baseball in the Cape Cod Baseball League for the Chatham A's, and in 1996 and 1997 for the Hyannis Mets. He was again selected in the MLB Draft, this time by the Houston Astros after his junior season, but again elected to stay in school. Byrnes finished his UCLA career as one of the most successful hitters in Pac-10 history, with a .331 batting average and 75 doubles—a conference record. Byrnes was inducted into the UCLA Athletics Hall of Fame in 2013.

== Professional career ==
=== Oakland Athletics ===
==== Draft and minor leagues (1998–2000) ====
Byrnes was selected in the 8th round of the 1998 Major League Baseball draft by the Oakland Athletics. In the 1998 season, he played for the Low-A Southern Oregon Timberjacks and the High-A Visalia Oaks, where he batted a combined .357 with 19 doubles, four triples, 11 home runs, 52 runs batted in (RBI), and 17 stolen bases. In 1999, Byrnes played for the High-A Modesto A's and the Double-A Midland RockHounds, and in 139 combined games, Byrnes batted .306 with 42 doubles, one triple, seven home runs, 88 RBI, and 34 stolen bases.

==== Major Leagues (2000–2005) ====
Byrnes made his major league debut on August 22, 2000, against the Cleveland Indians. He went two-for-four with a stolen base in his first games, playing designated hitter, and batting seventh in the batting order. Byrnes batted .300 his first season, with three hits in 10 at-bats. The next season, 2001, Byrnes played 19 games with the A's. He hit his first home run of his major league career on June 9, 2001, against the San Francisco Giants. He batted .237 with one double, three home runs, five RBI, and one stolen base with the A's in 2001. Byrnes played two games in the 2001 American League Division Series against the New York Yankees, going hitless in two at-bats.

Byrnes was also involved in a 2003 baseball game that included two significant base running gaffes in a single inning. With a chance to close out the Boston Red Sox, the Athletics had a potential rally stifled by two controversial plays. Byrnes was tagged out after failing to touch home plate after a collision with catcher Jason Varitek, who had blocked the plate before attempting to catch the ball. After the collision, a hobbling Byrnes shoved Varitek and began walking back to the dugout. Varitek picked up the ball and tagged Byrnes out. This play was then followed up by Red Sox third baseman Bill Mueller running into Miguel Tejada as Byrnes was rounding third (later in the same inning). Tejada then stopped running home and was eventually tagged out; the umpires called Tejada out because he was tagged as a result of not attempting to advance home, not because of the obstruction by the third baseman.

On June 29, 2003, Byrnes hit for the cycle. In 2004, Byrnes had his best year with the A's, batting .283 with 20 home runs and 73 RBI.

=== Colorado Rockies (2005) ===
On July 13, 2005, the A's traded Byrnes and prospect Omar Quintanilla to the Colorado Rockies for pitchers Joe Kennedy and Jay Witasick. In 15 games with the Rockies, Byrnes batted .189 with two doubles, five RBI, and two stolen bases.

=== Baltimore Orioles (2005) ===
On July 30, 2005, Byrnes was traded to the Baltimore Orioles in exchange for outfielder Larry Bigbie. On August 15, Byrnes and the Orioles traveled to Oakland, marking the first time Byrnes played against his former team. After struggling against right-handed pitchers, the Orioles benched Byrnes and questioned his ability to be an everyday player. In 52 games with the Orioles that season, Byrnes batted .192 with seven doubles, one triple, three home runs, 11 RBI, and three stolen bases. In his combined totals that season with Oakland, Colorado, and Baltimore, Byrnes batted .231 with 22 doubles, three triples, 10 home runs, 35 RBI, and five stolen bases in 111 games. After the season, Byrnes elected free agency.

=== Arizona Diamondbacks (2006–2009) ===
On December 30, 2005, Byrnes signed a one-year, $2.25 million contract with the Arizona Diamondbacks. Byrnes stated that he was excited for the opportunity to play center field regularly. In 2006, Byrnes batted .267 with 37 doubles, 3 triples, 26 home runs, 79 RBIs, and 25 stolen bases. He led the team in home runs, stolen bases, and slugging percentage, slugging .482.

Midway through the 2007 season, Byrnes signed a three-year, $30 million contract extension with the Diamondbacks. He became the 11th player in MLB history to record 50 stolen bases and hit 20 home runs in the same season. At the end on the season, Byrnes batted .286 with 30 doubles, 8 triples, 21 home runs, 83 RBIs, and 50 stolen bases in 160 games. He led the Diamondbacks in doubles, RBIs, stolen bases, caught stealing (7), and total bases (288). Byrnes was also 11^{th} in National League Most Valuable Player Award voting. He was honored with a Fielding Bible Award as the best fielding left fielder in MLB.

On May 27, 2008, Byrnes was placed on the 15-day disabled list for the first time in his career with sore hamstrings. He underwent an MRI that showed he had tears in both of his hamstrings. Byrnes returned to the team on June 23, 2008, batting leadoff against the Boston Red Sox at Fenway Park. After 6 games in June, his season was over. He batted .209 with 13 doubles, 1 triple, 6 home runs, 24 RBIs, and 4 stolen bases in 52 games.

On June 25, 2009, Byrnes was placed on the disabled list with broken left hand. He was injured during a game against the Texas Rangers after opposing pitcher Scott Feldman hit Byrnes on the hand with a pitch. After he sustained the injury, he was replaced by Ryan Roberts. He was reinstated from the disabled list on September 5. On January 15, 2010, Byrnes was designated for assignment by the Arizona Diamondbacks to make room on the roster for Adam LaRoche.

=== Seattle Mariners (2010) ===
Byrnes had shown interest in joining the San Francisco Giants after he was designated for assignment by the Diamondbacks, however, on January 29, 2010, Byrnes signed a one-year, $400,000 contract with the Seattle Mariners. To make room for Byrnes on the 40-man roster, the Mariners designated first baseman Tommy Everidge for assignment. The Diamondbacks were still responsible for the remaining $11 million on his contract he had with them before being released. Byrnes was slated to share playing time in the outfield with Milton Bradley at the time of his signing. Byrnes said this about being signed by the Mariners:

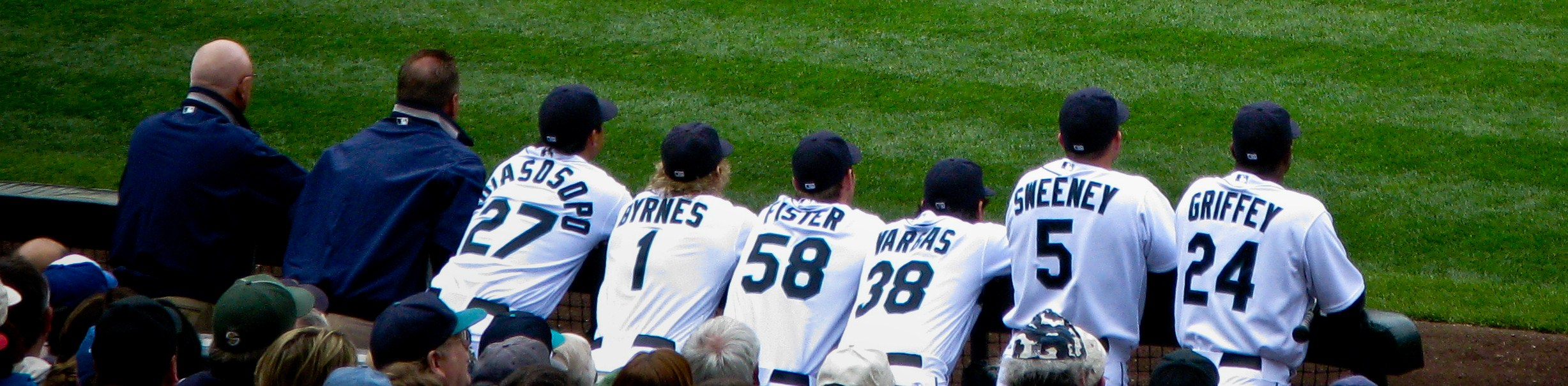
Eric Byrnes (center) signed with the Mariners in 2010.

Speaking with Jack [Zduriencik], the role wasn't necessarily specified other than the fact that he believes that I would contribute. That's all that I needed to hear. I'm healthy for the first time in two years. I just needed a team to believe in me half as much as I believe in myself.

— Eric Byrnes, MLB.com: January 29, 2010.

On April 30, in the 11th inning of the Mariners game versus the Rangers with Ichiro Suzuki on third base, manager Don Wakamatsu gave Byrnes the signal for a suicide squeeze. Byrnes was ordered to bunt on any pitch he saw, but as the pitch came to him, he inexplicably pulled his bat away, leaving Ichiro to be tagged out at home. After the Mariners lost the game, Byrnes stormed out of the clubhouse and out of Safeco Field on his bicycle, passing general manager Jack Zduriencik in a fury. He would be released two days later.

Byrnes was released by the Mariners on May 2, after batting .094 with three hits in 32 at-bats, one run scored, two doubles, nine strikeouts, and six bases on balls in 15 games on the season with Seattle. In a press release by the Mariners, Zduriencik said that, "Eric Byrnes is a tremendous competitor and a credit to baseball. We wish him only the best and expect him to land on his feet."

On May 13, 2010, Byrnes announced his retirement from MLB.

== Post-playing career ==
=== Broadcasting career ===
During the 2006 postseason, Byrnes was an analyst for ESPN's Baseball Tonight. He has also appeared on Fox's baseball pre-game show and The Best Damn Sports Show Period. Byrnes was a guest analyst for the first two games of the 2006 World Series pre-game show and for some of the 2007 World Series on Fox Sports. During the 2007 All Star Game at AT&T Park, he was in a kayak in McCovey Cove with his bulldog Bruin during the pre-game and game itself for the Fox Sports broadcast.

During the 2006 offseason, Byrnes hosted a radio show on KNBR in San Francisco. He had his own TV show, called "The Eric Byrnes Show," which aired on FSN Arizona during the Diamondbacks' regular season. The show featured behind-the-scenes looks at the Diamondbacks, as well as Byrnes's personal life. During the 2007 off-season, Byrnes began a weekly radio show on XM Satellite Radio, called "Hustle with Eric Byrnes."

Byrnes was a broadcaster with ESPN for the 2010 College World Series and was a contributor to the MLB Network. He departed the network in January 2021.

On March 18, 2011, Byrnes was hired by KNBR to host a nightly talk show, holding the 7–10 pm slot, as well as doing a Giants post-game show. Byrnes began his talk show on March 23, 2011. Byrnes occasionally co-hosted the Mr. T. show with Tom Tolbert and Ray Ratto. Byrnes also worked as an analyst for select Pac-12 Network baseball games.

=== Savannah Bananas ===
Byrnes was the manager for the Savannah Bananas, a barnstorming baseball team based in Savannah, Georgia, during the 2021 season. In 2022, he was named the manager of the Bananas Premier Team. He remained with the team in 2023 with the job title "director of chaos" and did not always travel with the team. He did not coach the team in 2024.

== Personal life ==
Byrnes lives in Lake Tahoe. He and his wife have three children. They have had several bulldogs. Byrnes played slow pitch softball and golf. He is also a trail runner.

On April 22–23, 2019, Byrnes set a Guinness Book of World Records mark for most holes of golf in a single day, 420 holes.

Byrnes has written three books: F*It List: Life Lessons from a Human Crash Test Dummy in 2019, The Daily Hustle 222 in 2022, and Let Them Play: A Parenting and Coaching Guide to Youth Sports in 2024.

== See also ==
- List of Major League Baseball players to hit for the cycle

Achievements
Preceded by Brad Wilkerson	Hitting for the cycle June 29, 2003	Succeeded by Travis Hafner
