= Garrett Atkins =

American baseball player (born 1979)

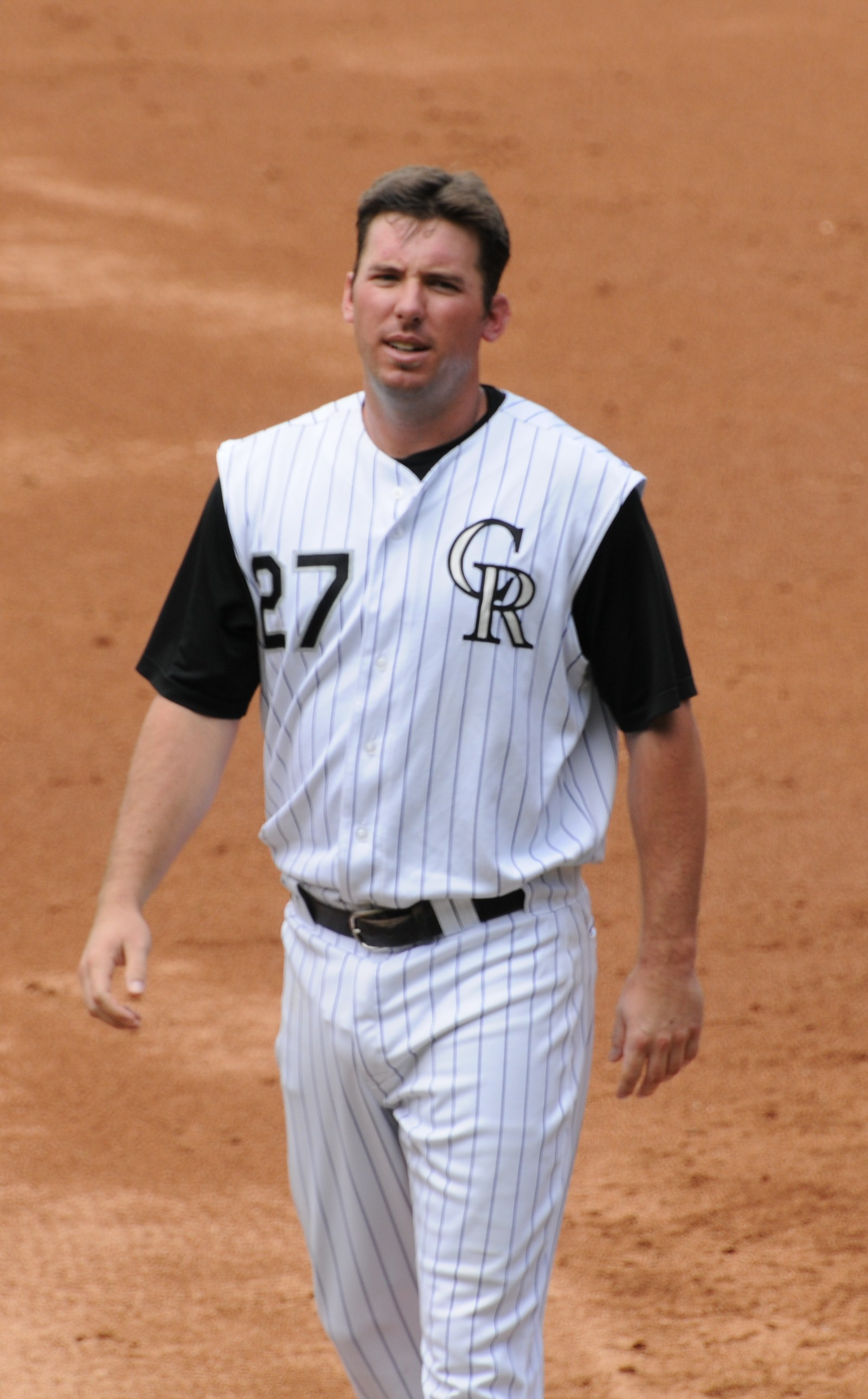
- Atkins with the Colorado Rockies in 2008
- Third baseman
- Born: December 12, 1979 (age 46); Orange, California, U.S.
- Batted: Right Threw: Right

MLB debut
- August 3, 2003, for the Colorado Rockies

Last MLB appearance
- June 25, 2010, for the Baltimore Orioles

MLB statistics
- Batting average: .285
- Home runs: 99
- Runs batted in: 488
- Stats at Baseball Reference

Teams
- Colorado Rockies (2003–2009); Baltimore Orioles (2010)

Garrett Bernard Atkins (born December 12, 1979) is an American former Major League Baseball third baseman. Between 2003 and 2010, he played for the Colorado Rockies and Baltimore Orioles.

== Amateur career ==
=== High school career ===
Atkins attended University High School in Irvine, California. As a senior, he was named the Irvine World News All-City MVP, after posting a .557 batting average, along with a school single-season record 13 home runs.

=== College career ===
After being drafted by the New York Mets in 1997 out of high school, Atkins elected to attend college. He was recruited by Pepperdine, USC, Oklahoma State, Cal State Fullerton and UCLA, choosing the Bruins. At UCLA, Atkins majored in sociology and became the first three-time All-American. He began as a first baseman before converting to third base, where he made 51 starts in 1998. However, in 1999, his sophomore campaign, Atkins played first base again and led the team in hits. He was a teammate and roommate of future MLB All-Star Chase Utley, and they were only two Bruins to start every game.

In 1998 and 1999, Atkins played collegiate summer baseball for the Cotuit Kettleers of the Cape Cod Baseball League (CCBL). He hit .383 in 1998, and in 1999, he was named playoff MVP as he led the Kettleers to the league title. Atkins was inducted into the CCBL Hall of Fame in 2013.

== Professional career ==
=== Colorado Rockies ===
The Colorado Rockies drafted Atkins in the fifth round (137th overall) of the 2000 MLB draft.

Atkins made his major league debut in 2003 and hit .159 with 0 home runs and 4 RBIs. He fared better in his second stint in the majors in 2004, hitting .357 with 1 home run and 8 RBIs. Atkins won the Rockies' third base job in 2005 but was placed on the DL with a strained hamstring before the season started. He returned in April and finished fourth in the Rookie of the Year voting after a season in which he topped National League rookies with 221 total bases, 31 doubles, 45 walks, and 45 extra-base hits. He also finished the year with a 16-game hitting streak in September. He hit .287 batting average, 13 homers, and 89 RBIs. Atkins followed with two strong seasons in 2006 and 2007, where he hit a combined 54 HR and 231 RBI and took part in his only World Series, where the Rockies lost in four games to the Boston Red Sox.

In 2008, Atkins spent much of the season playing first base, replacing the injured Todd Helton, marking a defensive transition to "a more natural position for him." Prior to the start of the 2009 season, Atkins accepted a one-year, $7 million contract from the Rockies. He struggled, hitting .226 with nine home runs, and 48 RBIs. With the emergence of Ian Stewart, Atkins became less of a priority in the Rockies long-term plans and was non-tendered on December 12, 2009, officially making him a free agent.

=== Baltimore Orioles ===
Atkins agreed to a one-year, $4 million deal with the Baltimore Orioles for 2010. On June 27, the Orioles designated Atkins for assignment. On July 6, he was released.

=== Pittsburgh Pirates ===
Atkins agreed to a minor league deal with the Pirates on December 23, 2010. In March 2011, Atkins was released.

== Awards and honors ==
- 2005 Topps Major League Rookie All-Star Team; 3B
- National League Rookie of the Month (June 2005)

Awards
Preceded by Ryan Church	National League Rookie of the Month; June 2005	Succeeded by Zach Duke
Preceded by Chad Tracy	Topps Rookie All-Star Third Baseman; 2005	Succeeded by Ryan Zimmerman
