= Chase Utley =

American baseball player (born 1978)

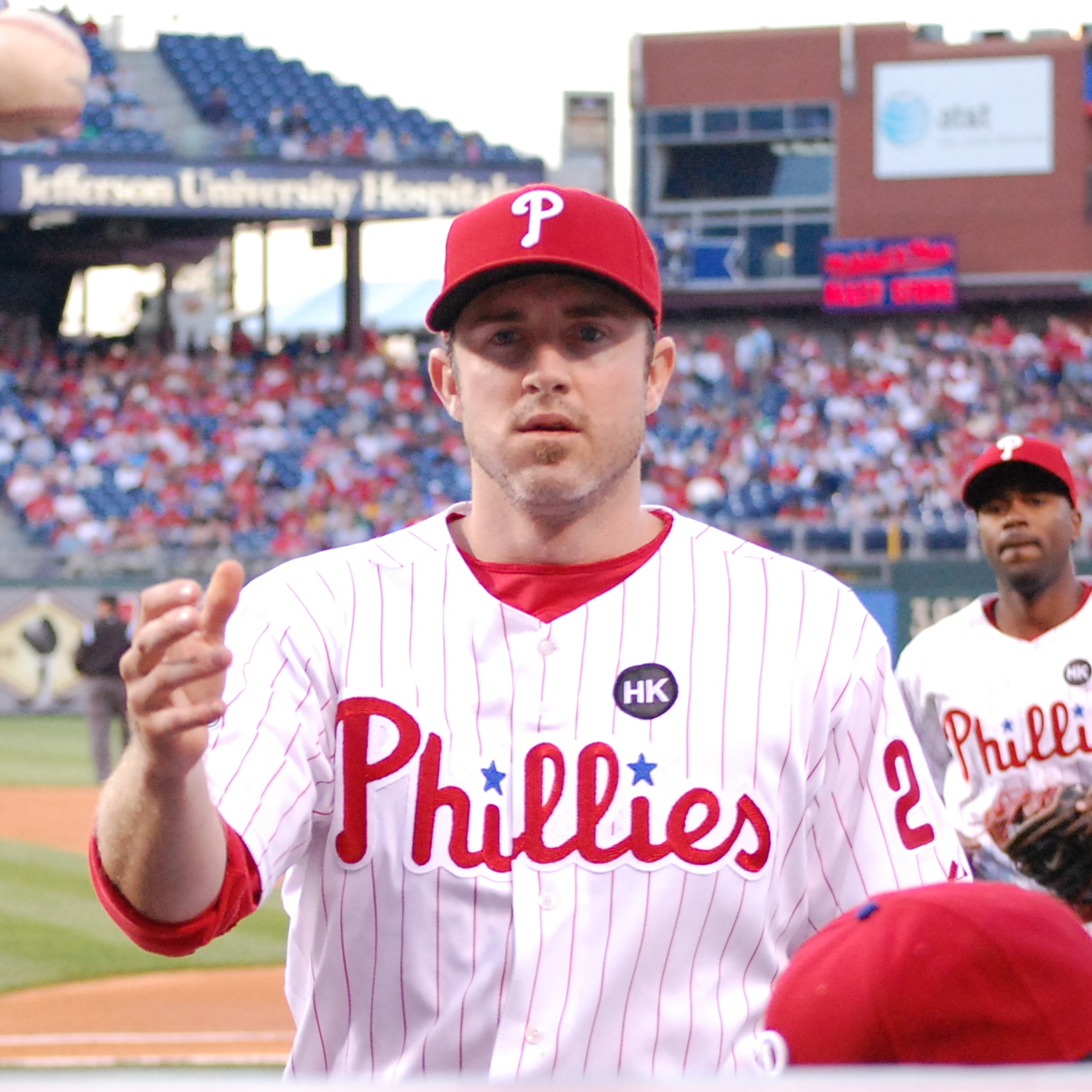
- Utley with the Philadelphia Phillies in 2009
- Second baseman
- Born: December 17, 1978 (age 47); Pasadena, California, U.S.
- Batted: Left Threw: Right

MLB debut
- April 4, 2003, for the Philadelphia Phillies

Last MLB appearance
- September 30, 2018, for the Los Angeles Dodgers

MLB statistics
- Batting average: .275
- Home runs: 259
- Runs batted in: 1,025
- Stats at Baseball Reference

Teams
- Philadelphia Phillies (2003–2015); Los Angeles Dodgers (2015–2018)

Career highlights and awards
- 6× All-Star (2006–2010, 2014); World Series champion (2008); 4× Silver Slugger Award (2006–2009); Philadelphia Phillies Wall of Fame

Chase Cameron Utley (born December 17, 1978), nicknamed "the Man" and "Silver Fox," is an American former professional baseball second baseman who played in Major League Baseball (MLB) for 16 seasons, primarily for the Philadelphia Phillies. He also played for the Los Angeles Dodgers. He is a six-time All-Star, won a World Series with the Phillies in 2008, and was chosen as the second baseman on the Sports Illustrated All-Decade Team for the 2000s. He batted left-handed and threw right-handed.

After becoming a permanent fixture as the Phillies' second baseman, Utley demonstrated versatility, spending some time at first base as well. As his fielding improved, he and shortstop Jimmy Rollins were regarded as one of the best middle-infield combinations in the NL until Rollins was traded to the Dodgers in the winter of 2014. Utley was considered by fans to be a team leader of the Phillies, alongside Rollins and Ryan Howard, and he was also noted for his leadership qualities with the Dodgers. Utley was known for his quiet understated demeanor, instead setting an example for teammates with his exhaustive preparation in the video room and the batting cage. He has been criticized by some as a "dirty" player, particularly for an overly aggressive baserunning style which included a 2015 incident where Utley intentionally slid into New York Mets shortstop Rubén Tejada, breaking his leg.

Utley's seven career World Series home runs are the most for a second baseman, and he shares the record of five home runs in a single World Series with Reggie Jackson and George Springer.

== Early life ==
Chase Cameron Utley was born on December 17, 1978, in Pasadena, California, to David and Terrell Utley. He was raised with his younger sister, Taylor Ann, in Long Beach, California.

Utley played baseball at Long Beach Polytechnic High School, alongside former MLB player, Milton Bradley and at the University of California, Los Angeles (UCLA) for the UCLA Bruins. In high school, his coach said that Utley had "the fastest hands he had ever seen on a high school player." He hit over .500 his senior year, with a slugging percentage of over 1.000, struck out just twice in 80 at bats, and earned high school All-American honors. He also set a school single-season record with 14 home runs Utley was drafted in the second round of the 1997 Major League Baseball draft by the Los Angeles Dodgers with the 76th pick, but turned down a $850,000 offer by the Dodgers to attend UCLA. A star shortstop in high school, the Bruins instead moved him to second base because his arm strength was more of a liability at shortstop. He hit .382 with 22 home runs as a junior at UCLA in 2000 while leading the Bruins to the NCAA Super Regionals. He was selected to the All-Pac-10 team and the Sporting News and National Collegiate Baseball Writers first team All-American teams.

While at UCLA, Utley played collegiate summer baseball for the Brewster Whitecaps of the Cape Cod Baseball League in 1998, and returned to the league in 1999 to play for the Cotuit Kettleers where he was named a league all-star.

== Professional career ==
=== Draft and minor leagues ===
Utley was drafted by the Philadelphia Phillies in the first round (15th pick) of the 2000 amateur draft. At the time, the team's scouting director claimed he was a combination of Jeff Kent and Adam Kennedy. He signed on July 29, 2000, for a $1,780,000 signing bonus.

Utley played for the Phillies' farm system with the Batavia Muckdogs of the Class A-Short Season New York–Penn League in 2000, the Clearwater Phillies of the Class A-Advanced Florida State League in 2001, and the Scranton/Wilkes-Barre Red Barons of the Class AAA International League in 2002 and 2003. He was selected to the All-Star Futures Game in 2001 and made the International League post-season all-star team in 2003.

=== Philadelphia Phillies (2003–2015) ===
Utley made his major league debut on April 4, 2003, as a pinch hitter against the Pittsburgh Pirates. He was struck out swinging by Jeff Suppan in his first at-bat. In his first major league start, on April 24 against the Colorado Rockies, Utley recorded his first major league hit, a grand slam off Aaron Cook. He was optioned back to the minors on April 30 recalled by the Phillies again in August 2003, to replace Plácido Polanco at second base (Polanco was moved to third to compensate for the loss of third baseman David Bell to the disabled list). Utley scored the final game winning RBI in Phillies history at Veterans Stadium, on September 27, 2003. Utley recorded the final at-bat at Veterans Stadium by grounding into a game-ending double play on September 28, 2003. In 43 games, he had a .239 batting average.

By the end of 2004, it became evident to management that Utley was the team's future second baseman (Utley often credits Tom Gresh for helping him improve his hitting). However, a roster spot was not permanently available; his path to the majors was effectively blocked by Polanco. Despite out-playing Polanco for much of the season, he remained on the bench despite Phillies fans and media commentators questioning why he was not playing more. He played in 94 games for the Phillies in 2004 (which included 13 at first base) and hit .266 with 13 homers and 57 RBI.

In June 2005, the Phillies traded Polanco to the Detroit Tigers for pitcher Ugueth Urbina and infielder Ramón Martínez. Now a full-time starter, Utley had a breakout season, hitting .291 with 28 home runs, 105 RBI, and 16 stolen bases. He was selected by the Philadelphia chapter of the Baseball Writers' Association of America as the co-recipient of the 2005 Mike Schmidt Most Valuable Player Award.

==== 2006 ====
Utley was a member of Team USA in the 2006 World Baseball Classic, and was selected by fans to start at second base for the National League at the 2006 Major League Baseball All-Star Game at PNC Park in Pittsburgh. In November, he traveled to Japan with other major league stars to compete against Japanese All-Stars in an exhibition tournament.

During the 2006 season, Utley maintained a 35-game hitting streak—the second-longest streak in Phillies history behind teammate Jimmy Rollins, who hit for 38 straight games between 2005 and 2006 (36 games in 2005 and two in 2006). Utley tied Luis Castillo, who had a 35-game hitting streak in 2002, for the longest hitting streak by a second baseman. Utley's streak was also the longest for a purely left-handed hitter since Tommy Holmes' 37-game streak in 1945. As a result, Utley was named the National League Player of the Month for July 2006.

On September 24, Utley hit two home runs in a 10–7 win over the Florida Marlins. It was his seventh multi-home run game of the 2006 season, tying a franchise record set in 1968 and tied by Ryan Howard in 2006. Utley combined with Jimmy Rollins in 2006 to become the first pair of middle infielders in National League history to hit 25 home runs each in the same season; Utley hit 32, while Rollins hit 25. He later received the Silver Slugger Award for being the best hitting second baseman in the National League. He also batted .309 in 2006 with 32 homers and 102 RBI.

==== 2007 ====
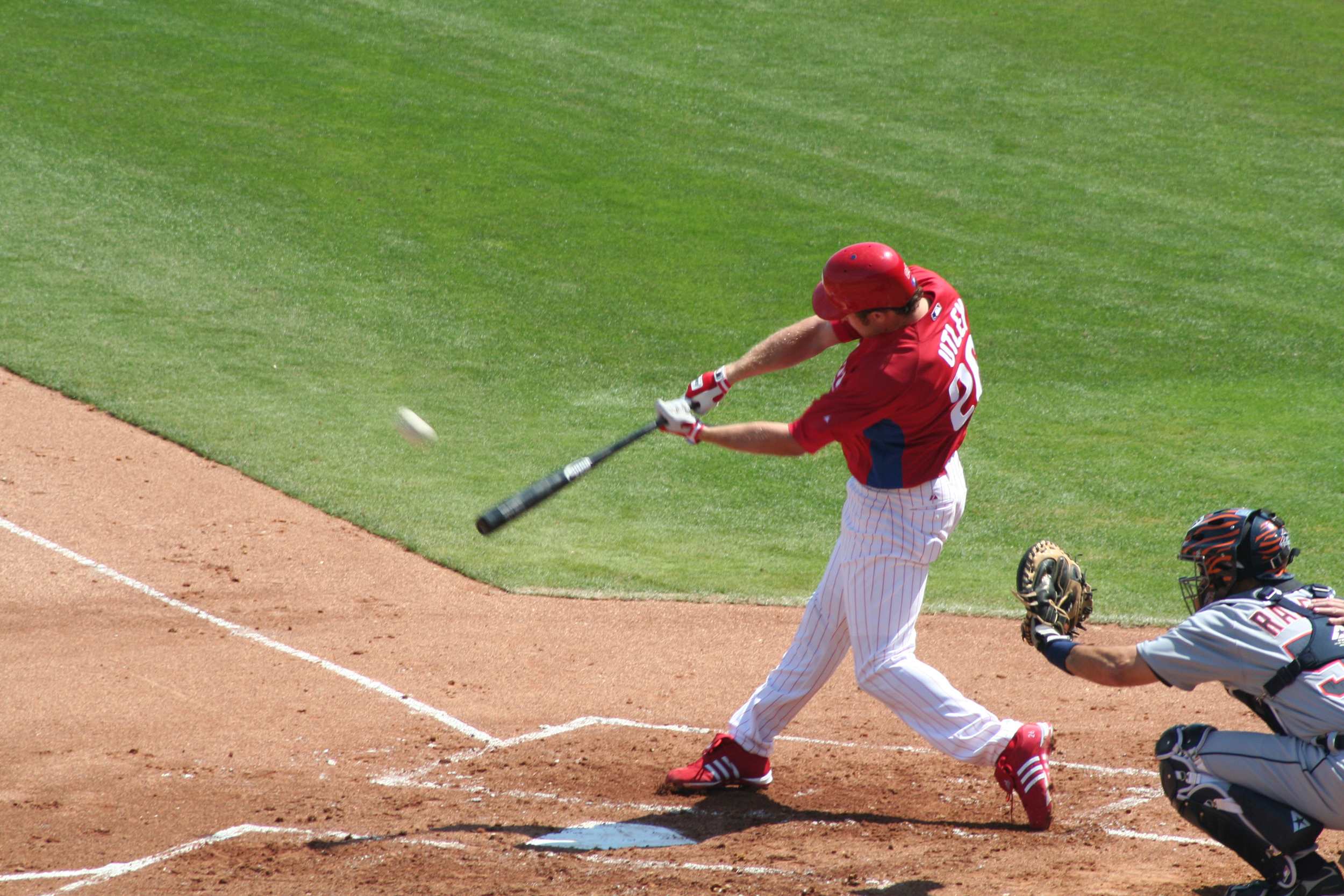
Utley hits a home run on March 11, 2007 against the Detroit Tigers during spring training.

On January 21, 2007, the day after his wedding, Utley signed a 7-year, $85 million contract extension with the Phillies.

After starting the season hot, Utley was again selected by the fans to be the starting second baseman in the 2007 Major League Baseball All-Star Game, which was his second All-Star selection. However, on July 26, Utley was hit by a pitch thrown by Washington Nationals pitcher John Lannan; he broke the fourth metacarpal bone in his right hand. "I'll be back. Don't worry, guys," Utley said after the game. "It's a break, but not that bad of a break. I definitely expect to be back ... this season." He had successful surgery on his hand, but as a result of the surgery, he was placed on the 15-day disabled list. Utley returned to the lineup on August 27, hit a home run and an RBI double, went 3 for 5, and drew a curtain call from the hometown crowd.

Utley finished the season with a .332 batting average, 22 home runs, 103 RBIs and 48 doubles (second in the National League). He helped the Phillies to their first playoff appearance in fourteen seasons as the team capped a dramatic comeback by clinching the National League East division title on the final day of the regular season. Utley's offensive performance also earned him a Silver Slugger Award for the second consecutive season. He had two hits in 11 at-bats as the Phillies were swept in three games by the Colorado Rockies in the 2007 National League Division Series.

==== 2008 ====
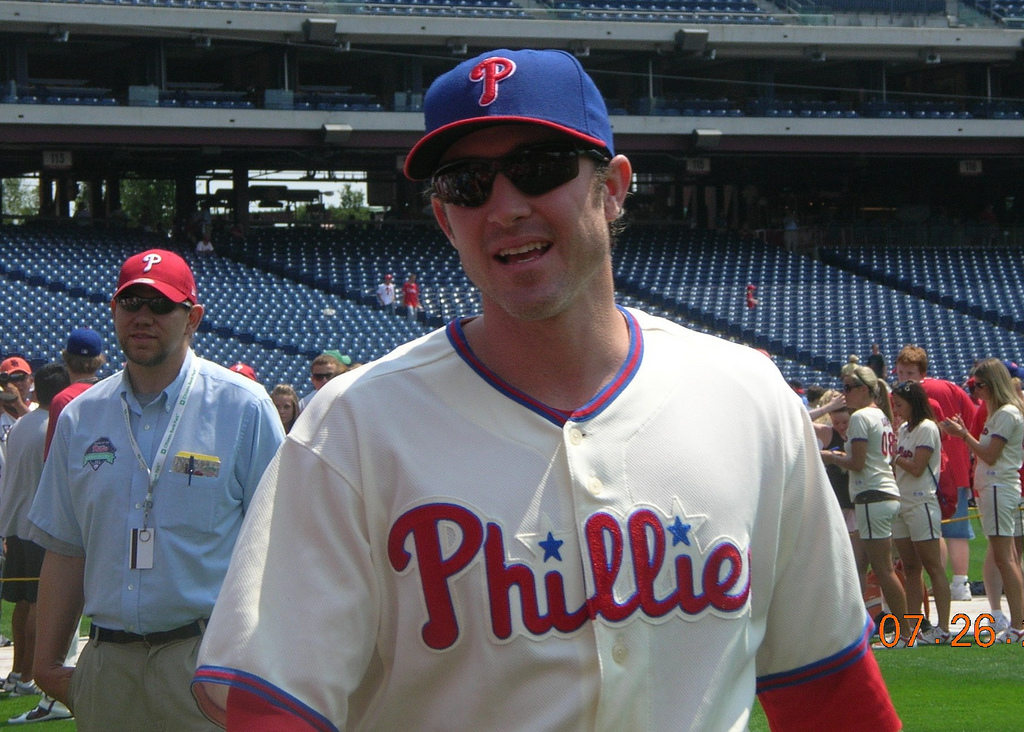
Chase Utley, Phillies Photo Day 2008

Through the month of April, Utley hit a league-leading 11 home runs – including seven in the seven games from April 17–23. He completed a streak of five consecutive games with a home run, and hit .360 (good for fifth in the National League) in 111 at-bats on his way to becoming the National League's Player of the Month. His five-game home run streak tied the Phillies franchise record, shared by Bobby Abreu (May 8–12, 2005), Mike Schmidt (June 6–10, 1979) and Dick Allen (May 27 – June 1, 1969).

Though his bat cooled a bit in May (his monthly average was .259), Utley still hit eight more home runs in the month, breaking the Phillies franchise record for home runs before June – Cy Williams (1923) and Ryan Howard (2006) shared the previous mark of 18 – and knocked in 26 RBIs. When Howard hit his 15th home run on May 30, he and Utley became the first pair of Phillies to hit 15 home runs each before June. On May 13, 2008, Utley received an unexpected accolade from lifelong baseball fan (and 43rd US President) George W. Bush, who stated in an interview with politico.com that Utley would be the first position player he would select if he were an MLB team owner. He was also selected by Fitness Magazine as one of the 25 "fittest guys in the country."

On June 1, Utley hit his Major League-leading 20th home run and drove in his National League-leading 50th run as part of a comeback win against the Florida Marlins that propelled the Phillies back into first place in the National League East; the 1-for-2 performance capped a productive week for Utley that earned him the National League Player of the Week Award, his fifth, for the first time since April 23–29, 2007. The next night, Utley hit another home run for another streak of five games with a longball amidst a span of eight games with seven home runs (May 25 – June 2). Utley hit the first in a set of back-to-back-to-back Philadelphia home runs in a 20–2 win over the St. Louis Cardinals on June 13, along with Ryan Howard and Pat Burrell. It was the seventh time that the Phillies had hit three consecutive home runs, the first time since May 18, 2004, and the fourth occurrence by any team in the 2008 season.

Utley went a career-long 0-for-24 in the midst of a 1-for-29 slump, during which the Phillies lost a season-high six in a row. On the 21st, Utley was benched for the first time this season, ending his streak of 101 consecutive games played. On the 25th, Utley broke out of his skid with a 4-for-5 performance – his first four-hit game of the season – in a 4–0 shutout over the Oakland Athletics. Utley was also selected to start his third consecutive All-Star game.

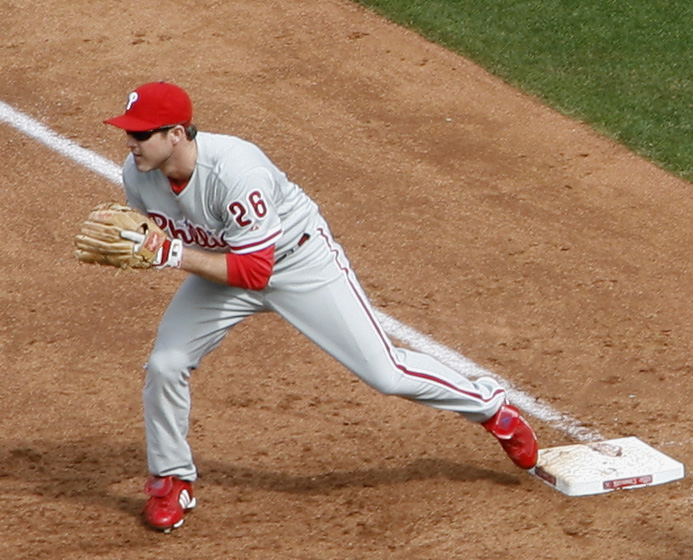
Chase Utley covers first base, 2009

===== Postseason =====
At the end of the 2008 regular season, with 33 home runs, 104 RBI, and a team-high 177 hits, Utley helped the Phillies into the 2008 playoffs, and win their first National League pennant since 1993 and first World Series title since 1980 (the second ever World Series title for the team). Utley batted 3 for 18 (.167) in the World Series, but hit two home runs and walked five times as well. During the seventh inning of Game 5, Utley faked a throw to first, then threw Jason Bartlett out at home for the third out in a play later described as having saved the Series for the Phillies. The fans voted his fake and throw to home plate in Game 5 as the "This Year in Baseball Awards" Postseason Moment of the Year. Sports Talk Philly highlighted this play as they named Utley as Number 6 on the list of the 25 greatest Phillies.

Following the ensuing World Series parade on October 31, 2008, culminating in a celebration at Citizens Bank Park, Utley came up to the microphone after being introduced by Harry Kalas and said to the fans in the stadium: "World champions. World fucking champions!" As he said this, his teammate Jayson Werth jumped up in roaring approval. The Philadelphia crowd erupted in prolonged cheers. The expletive was broadcast live on multiple Philadelphia television stations, which had not placed the celebration on tape delay.

Utley underwent hip surgery in November 2008.

==== 2009 ====
In 2009, he was named #6 on the Sporting News' list of the 50 greatest current players in baseball. A panel of 100 baseball people, many of them members of the Baseball Hall of Fame and winners of major baseball awards, was polled to arrive at the list.

He was the starter at second base for the National League All-Star team.

In 2009 Utley led the majors in hit by pitch, with 24. Utley also had a perfect stolen-base percentage in 2009, with 23 steals, setting a record for most steals in a single season without being caught.

===== Postseason =====
On October 28, Utley drew a two-out walk in the first inning of Game 1 of the 2009 World Series, setting a record for reaching base in consecutive postseason games (26). Utley hit two home runs in his next two at-bats, the first World Series game played in the new Yankee Stadium. With both home runs coming against left-hander CC Sabathia, Utley joined Babe Ruth as the second left-handed batter to hit two home runs in a World Series game against a left-handed pitcher. On November 1, Utley hit another home run against Sabathia in Game 4, and one day later, Utley hit two home runs in Game 5, giving him a total of five for the series, tying Reggie Jackson for the most home runs in a World Series. After the season, Utley was named the winner of the National League's Silver Slugger at second base for the fourth consecutive season. As of the 2021 World Series, Utley is the only player with two home runs in a November game.

In December, Sports Illustrated named Utley as the second baseman on its MLB All-Decade Team.

==== 2010 ====
On June 29, Utley was placed on the 15-day disabled list with a sprained thumb. He was voted into the All-Star Game as the starter at second base (for the fifth consecutive year), but was unable to play due to injury. He won a Fielding Bible Award for his statistically based defensive excellence during the year.

==== 2011 ====
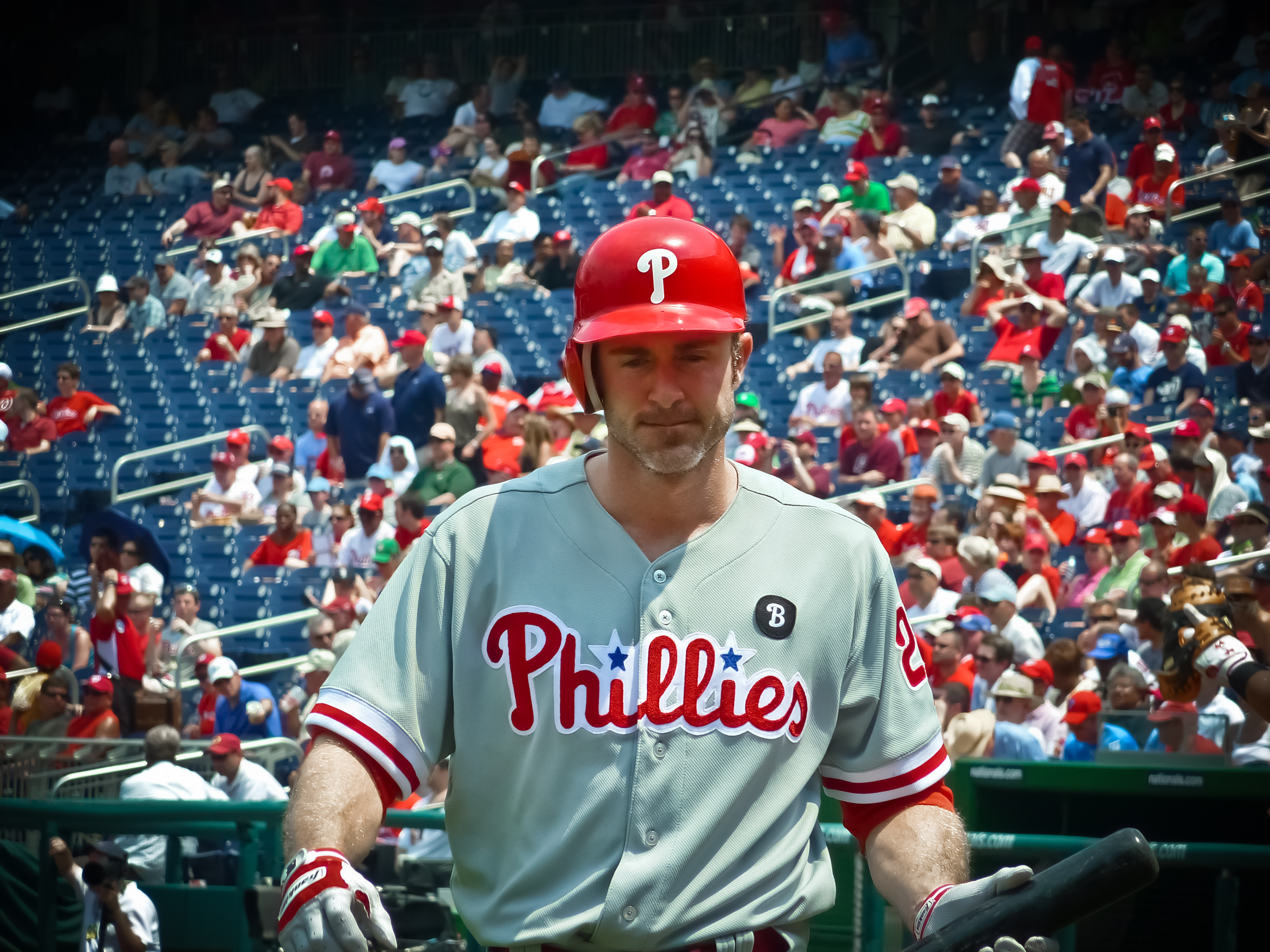
Utley in 2011

Utley finished the 2011 regular season having scored 54 runs, hitting safely 103 times (including 21 doubles, 6 triples, and 11 home runs), with a .259 batting average. This drop-off in performance coincided with the onset prior to the season of chronic knee problems. These conditions included patellar tendinitis, chondromalacia, and bone inflammation.

==== 2012 ====
During spring training, Utley left camp in mid-March to meet with a specialist regarding treatment of conditions in both knees, including cartilage damage. Utley began the season on the 15-day Disabled list. He was reactivated on June 27. In his first game of the season, Utley went 3 for 5 with a solo home run in his first at bat. He finished 2012 with numbers very similar to 2011, hitting .256 with 11 home runs and 45 RBI.

==== 2013 ====
Utley said that his knee was feeling great prior to the 2013 Grapefruit League games. On Opening Day, against the Atlanta Braves, he hit his 200th career home run. In 131 games of the 2013 season, Utley batted .284 with 18 homers and 69 runs batted in.

On August 7, 2013 it was announced that Utley and the Phillies had agreed on a two-year, $27 million contract extension with multiple vesting options.

==== 2014 ====
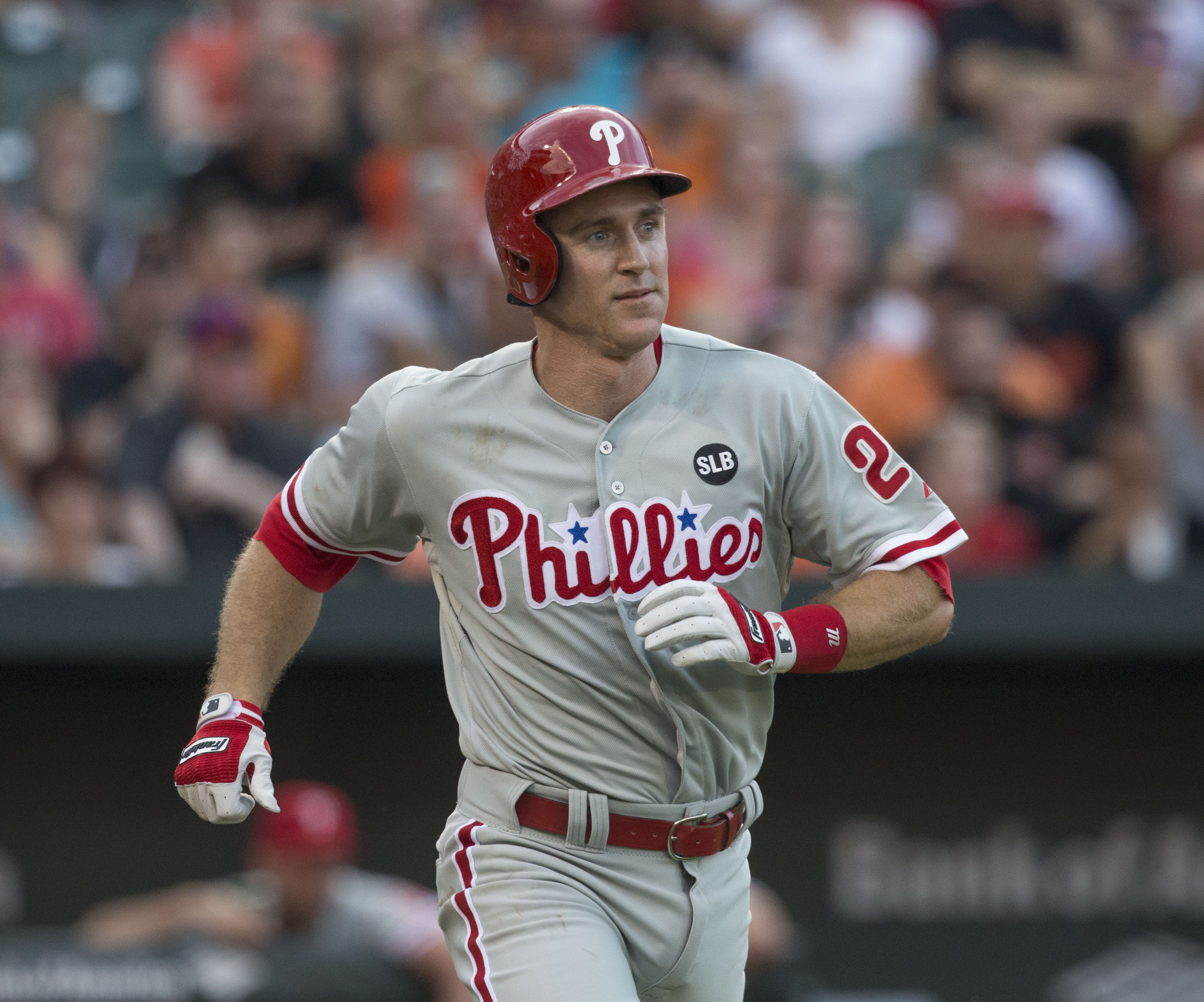
Utley in 2015

Utley had a slow start to spring training. He was hitting only .175 (10 for 57), including 1 double and 3 RBIs with just two games remaining. Utley remained confident for the 2014 season. "For younger guys, I think results make you feel better," Utley said. "But as you go, you realize they're not quite as important this time of year. Physically, I feel good. Early in the spring, I felt pretty decent at the plate. There were some times in the middle when I felt a little uncomfortable and a little out of sorts. The last four or five days, I've started to feel a little more comfortable at the dish. For a guy that has done this for a few years, your game plan for Spring training is different than it would be during the regular season." Despite a poor spring training, over the first two weeks of the season, he was "the hottest hitter in baseball", and as of April 13, possessed a 1.314 on-base plus slugging (OPS) average.

On May 25, Utley was the last out of Josh Beckett's no hitter when he struck out looking against the Los Angeles Dodgers right hander.

On July 6, MLB announced that Utley was voted in by the fans to start at second base in All-Star Game, which took place at Target Field in Minneapolis.

==== 2015 ====
In 249 at bats for the Phillies in 2015, he batted .217/.284/.333.

=== Los Angeles Dodgers (2015–2018) ===
==== 2015 ====
On August 19, 2015, Utley was traded to the Los Angeles Dodgers in exchange for Darnell Sweeney and John Richy. In his first game as a Dodger, Utley impressed with his aggressive baserunning, an area in which the Dodgers had struggled most of the season. On August 30, Utley was the final out of a no-hitter for the second time in as many years, this time against the Cubs' Jake Arrieta. As a Dodger, he was in 34 games and hit .202/.291/.363 with three homers and nine RBIs in 124 at bats. He also played three games at third base, the first time he had played there in the majors.

On October 10, 2015, in the seventh inning of Game 2 of the 2015 National League Division Series, Utley slid past second base into Rubén Tejada of the New York Mets in an attempt to break up what might have been an inning-ending double play, fracturing Tejada's right fibula in the collision. Utley was ruled safe by the umpires after a video review. The Dodgers, who trailed 2–1 at the time of the incident, scored four runs in the inning and went on to win by a score of 5–2. Major League Baseball suspended Utley for two games for his conduct "in violation of Official Baseball Rule 5.09 (a) (13), which is designed to protect fielders from precisely this type of rolling block that occurs away from the base." Utley appealed the suspension and remained active for the rest of the Dodgers' post-season games, as the Dodgers went on to lose the series to the Mets in five games. MLB subsequently dropped Utley's suspension on March 6, 2016, with Chief Baseball Officer Joe Torre stating "There wasn't anything clear-cut to say that play violated a rule." Tejada, whose career never fully recovered after that game, said in 2016 that what bothered him most about Utley's hit was that it came from a fellow middle infielder. "I would never do that to another infielder," Tejada said.

In February 2016 in response to Utley's slide into Tejada, the MLB and the MLB Players Association agreed that "slides on potential double plays will require runners to make a bona fide attempt to reach and remain on the base. Runners may still initiate contact with the fielder as a consequence of an otherwise permissible slide. A runner will be specifically prohibited from changing his pathway to the base or utilizing a 'roll block' for the purpose of initiating contact with the fielder." Reacting to the new rule, Utley said: "I imagine the rule probably is a little more clear and specific about what is allowed and not allowed."

==== 2016 ====
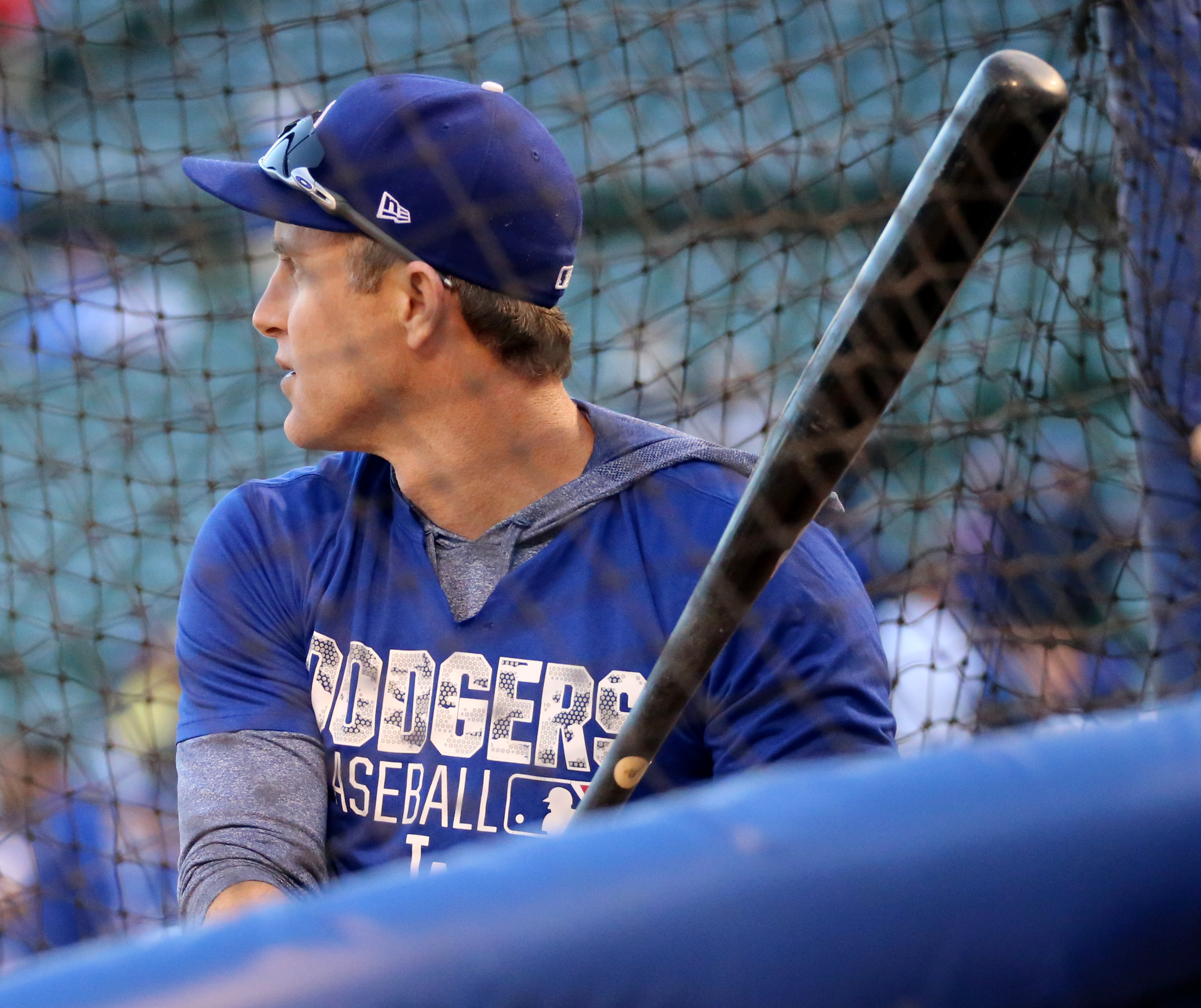
Utley during batting practice with the Dodgers during the 2016 NLCS

After the season, the Dodgers declined his 2016 option, making him a free agent. In December, he re-signed with the Dodgers on a one-year, $7 million, contract.

On May 28, 2016, in a regular season game against the New York Mets, Utley hit a solo home run and a grand slam, after he was thrown at by Mets pitcher Noah Syndergaard in the third inning in an apparent retaliation for Utley's slide on Rubén Tejada during the 2015 NLDS. He scored his 1,000th career run on June 22 against the Washington Nationals. On July 6, during a 14-inning 6–4 loss to the Baltimore Orioles, Utley had a career-high six hits and became the third-oldest player to accomplish such a feat. He was honored with the 2016 Roy Campanella Award. He appeared in 138 games in 2016, hitting .252/.319/.396 with 14 homers and 52 RBIs.

In Game 4 of the 2016 NLDS against the Washington Nationals, Utley hit a two-out RBI single in the bottom of the eighth inning to break a 5–5 tie and lead the Dodgers to an eventual 6–5 win. The Dodgers went on to eliminate the Nationals in five games.

==== 2017 ====
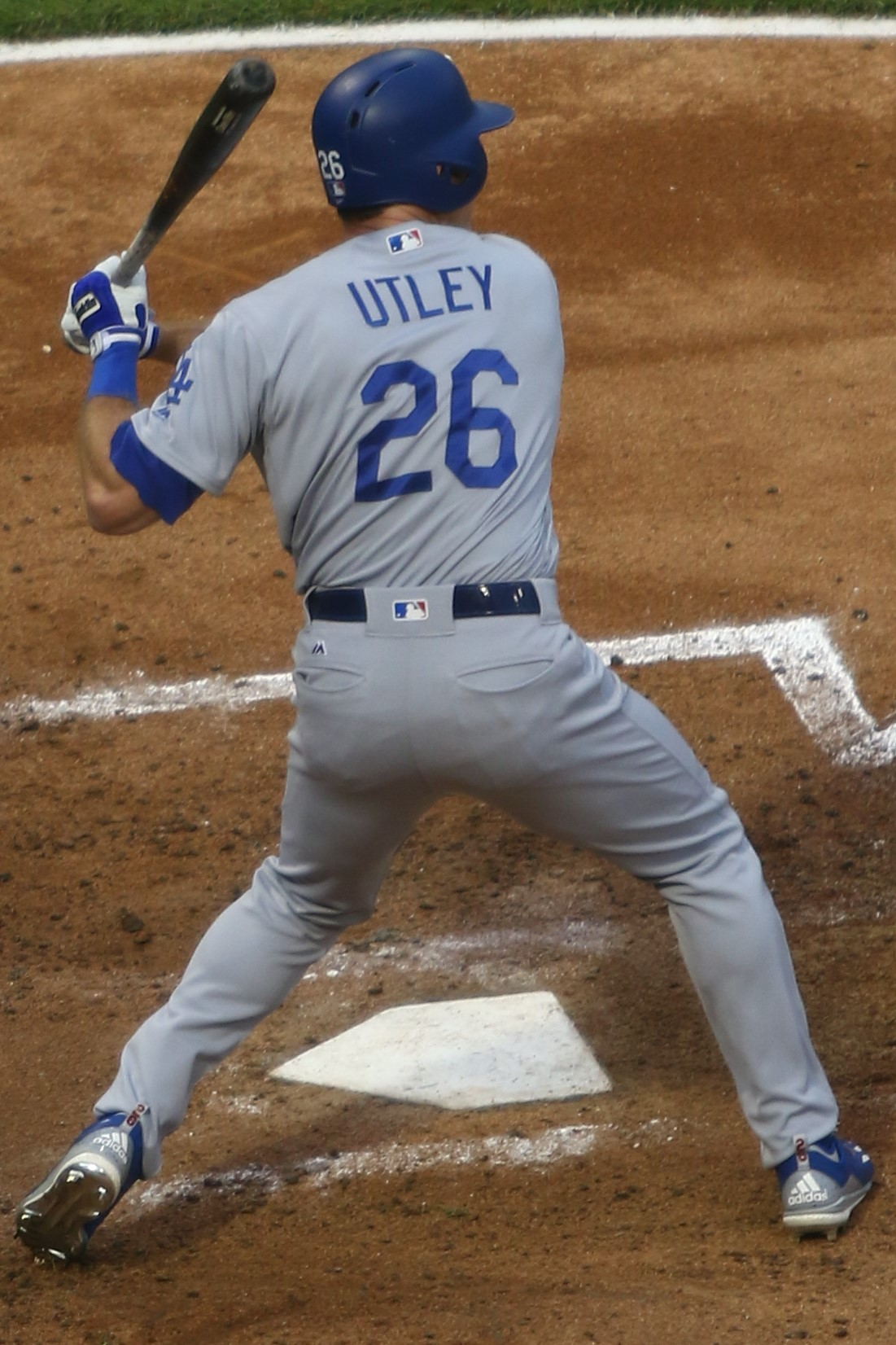
Utley at bat for the 2017 Los Angeles Dodgers

In February 2017, Utley signed a one-year, $2 million, contract to return to the Dodgers. He recorded his 1,000th career RBI with a double off Neftalí Feliz of the Kansas City Royals on July 7. On September 16, Utley recorded his 400th career double in a game against the Washington Nationals In 2017, he batted .236/.324/.405 in 309 at bats with eight home runs and 34 RBIs in 127 games played.

In the 2017 post-season, he was hitless in 15 at-bats, with five strikeouts, two walks and two hit by pitches. In Game 6 Utley was the oldest to score a go-ahead run in a World Series elimination game since Enos Slaughter in 1957.

==== 2018 ====
On February 17, 2018, Utley re-signed with the Dodgers for two years and $2 million. Utley was hit by a pitch on April 18 for the 200th time in his career, becoming the eighth player all-time to be hit by 200 career pitches.

On July 13, Utley announced his intention to retire after the conclusion of the 2018 season. His final MLB game was on September 30, 2018, where at San Francisco he struck out against Steven Okert in his only at-bat.

Utley was left off of the Dodgers’ postseason roster, but continued to travel and practice with the team as they lost the 2018 World Series to the Boston Red Sox four games to one.

== Personal life ==
Utley met his wife, Jennifer, while they were undergrads at UCLA. They married in January 2007 and have two children. During Utley's playing career, the family lived in Sausalito, California, during the offseason. In 2022, the family relocated to London after Utley was named MLB's "ambassador to Europe", tasked with "[promoting baseball] in Europe and in particular the United Kingdom".

Utley and his wife are avid animal lovers, having raised over $45,000 for the Pennsylvania Society for the Prevention of Cruelty to Animals. Utley appeared on behalf of PETA in their "Adopt Don't Buy" video, encouraging people to find companion animals at shelters. He and his wife are vocal proponents of rescue dogs and are particularly fond of pit bulls.

His batter introductory music in Philadelphia and in Los Angeles was the song "Kashmir" by Led Zeppelin. On team charter flights, Dodgers manager Dave Roberts noted that Utley "has the really pressed white shirts, the European-cut pants, the black shoes and the hair. He reminds you of James Bond."

Utley has made several appearances as himself in the show It's Always Sunny in Philadelphia, including alongside teammate Ryan Howard on the 2010 episode "The Gang Gets Stranded in the Woods", a 2013 episode where Utley responded to a letter written by Mac from the show years earlier, and the 2023 episode "The Gang Gets Cursed" where Mac finally meets him in person.

== See also ==
- List of Major League Baseball annual runs scored leaders
- List of Major League Baseball career assists as a second baseman leaders
- List of Major League Baseball career games played as a second baseman leaders
- List of Major League Baseball career hit by pitch leaders
- List of Major League Baseball career home run leaders
- List of Major League Baseball career putouts as a second baseman leaders
- List of Major League Baseball career runs scored leaders
- List of people from Pasadena, California
- List of Philadelphia Phillies award winners and league leaders
- List of University of California, Los Angeles people

Awards and achievements
Preceded by Bobby Abreu	Mike Schmidt Most Valuable Player (with Pat Burrell); 2005	Succeeded by Ryan Howard
Preceded by David Wright; Matt Holliday	National League Player of the Month; July 2006; April 2008	Succeeded by Ryan Howard; Lance Berkman
