= Troy Glaus =

American baseball player (born 1976)

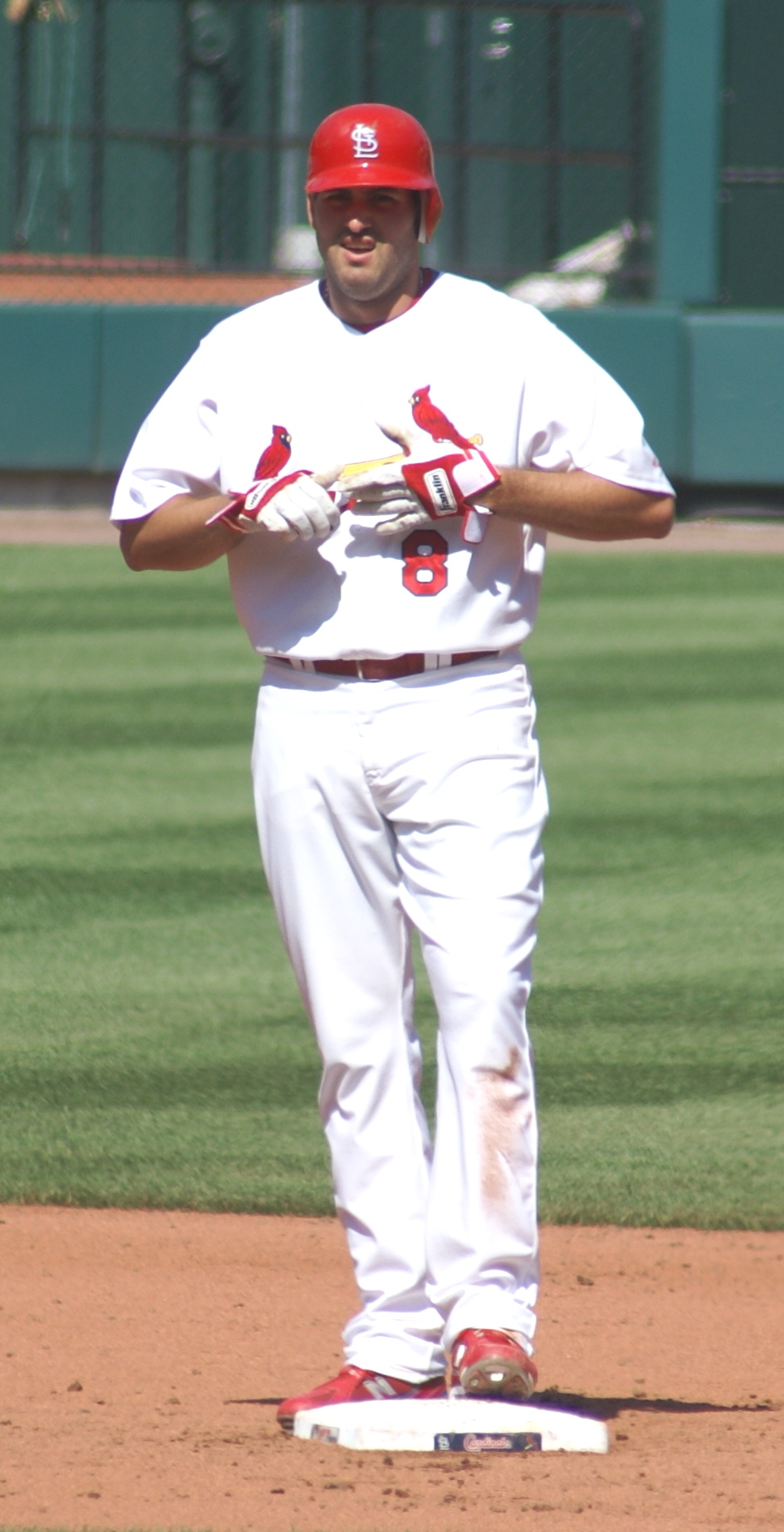
- Glaus with the St. Louis Cardinals in 2008
- Third baseman
- Born: August 3, 1976 (age 50); Tarzana, California, U.S.
- Batted: Right Threw: Right

MLB debut
- July 31, 1998, for the Anaheim Angels

Last MLB appearance
- October 1, 2010, for the Atlanta Braves

MLB statistics
- Batting average: .254
- Home runs: 320
- Runs batted in: 950
- Stats at Baseball Reference

Teams
- Anaheim Angels (1998–2004); Arizona Diamondbacks (2005); Toronto Blue Jays (2006–2007); St. Louis Cardinals (2008–2009); Atlanta Braves (2010)

Career highlights and awards
- 4× All-Star (2000, 2001, 2003, 2006); World Series champion (2002); World Series MVP (2002); 2× Silver Slugger Award (2000, 2001); AL home run leader (2000)
Medals
Men's baseball
Representing United States
Olympic Games
Bronze medal – third place	1996 Atlanta	Team

Troy Edward Glaus (/ˈɡlɔːs/; born August 3, 1976) is an American former professional baseball third baseman and first baseman. He played in Major League Baseball (MLB) with the Anaheim Angels (1998–2004), Arizona Diamondbacks (2005), Toronto Blue Jays (2006–2007), St. Louis Cardinals (2008–2009), and the Atlanta Braves (2010). Glaus lettered in baseball while attending UCLA. He won a bronze medal in baseball at the 1996 Summer Olympics as a member of the U.S. national baseball team. He was a four-time All-Star and won World Series MVP honors in 2002.

== Early life ==
In the 1997 season, he set two records with home runs: he hit 34 home runs to set the single-season record for the Pacific-10 Conference (breaking Mark McGwire's record). He helped the team reach the College World Series for the first time since 1969. He finished his career with 62 total home runs to set record for home runs by a Pacific-10 player. Within the South Division, he was named the Pac-12 Conference Baseball Player of the Year that year. He played shortstop and third base during his UCLA tenure; days after the end of the World Series, he was drafted by the Anaheim Angels in the MLB draft with the third overall pick.

== Professional career ==
In 13 seasons, Glaus hit .254 with 320 home runs and 950 RBI in 1537 games. In 19 postseason games, he hit .347 with nine home runs and 16 RBI. Glaus was selected to four All-Star Games, three with the Angels and one with the Blue Jays.

=== Anaheim Angels ===
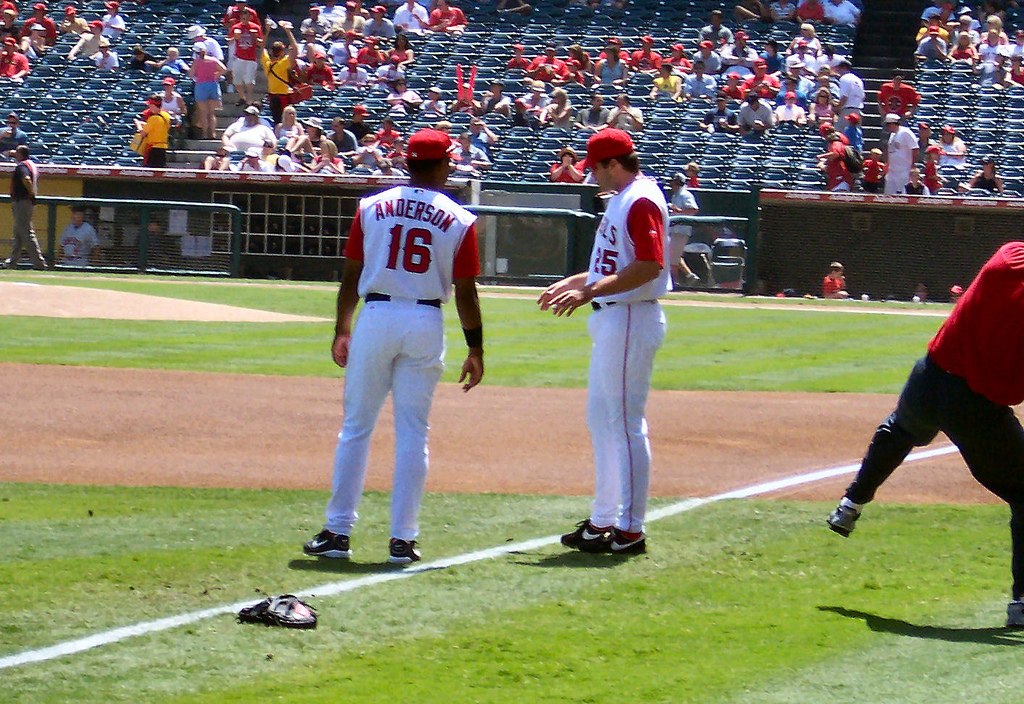
Garret Anderson (left) and Troy Glaus in 2002

Glaus began his career with the Angels in 1998 and was installed as the team's starting third baseman in 1999. He had a breakout season in 2000, becoming the all-time single season home run leader in Angels history with 47 while leading third baseman in adjusted range factor (2.95) in 2000. Glaus participated in the 2001 MLB All-Star Game and posted his second consecutive 40 home run season with 41 on the year.

In 2002, Glaus failed to reach the 40 home run club for the first time since the 1999 season, but he managed to hit thirty home runs in helping the Angels make the playoffs for the first time in 16 years. The Angels beat the San Francisco Giants in seven games in the 2002 World Series to win their first world championship title in team history. Glaus was awarded the World Series MVP award as he hit .385 with three home runs and eight RBIs and hit a go-ahead double in Game 6 to finish a five-run comeback for the Angels. Glaus had another All-Star year in 2003.

Glaus missed much of the 2004 season with a shoulder injury. 2004 was the last year of his contract with the Angels. As an established veteran, he was in demand on the free agent market and able to field lucrative offers for long-term contracts. Although Glaus had spent his entire career an Angel, and was a fan favorite, the team decided not to pursue Glaus' return. Amid concerns about Glaus' future health after his injury, the team decided to go with the much lower-priced alternative of turning the third base position over to young prospect Dallas McPherson, who they felt had a good chance to soon become as productive as Glaus had been.

=== Arizona Diamondbacks ===
Glaus ultimately signed with the Arizona Diamondbacks for $45 million over four years. He worked through his back problems in the 2005 season with the Diamondbacks, hitting 37 home runs with 97 RBIs. He also led the league in adjusted range factor (2.92), but his 24 errors tied him with David Wright for the most errors by a third baseman in the Major Leagues, and he had a Major League-low .946 fielding percentage at third.

=== Toronto Blue Jays ===
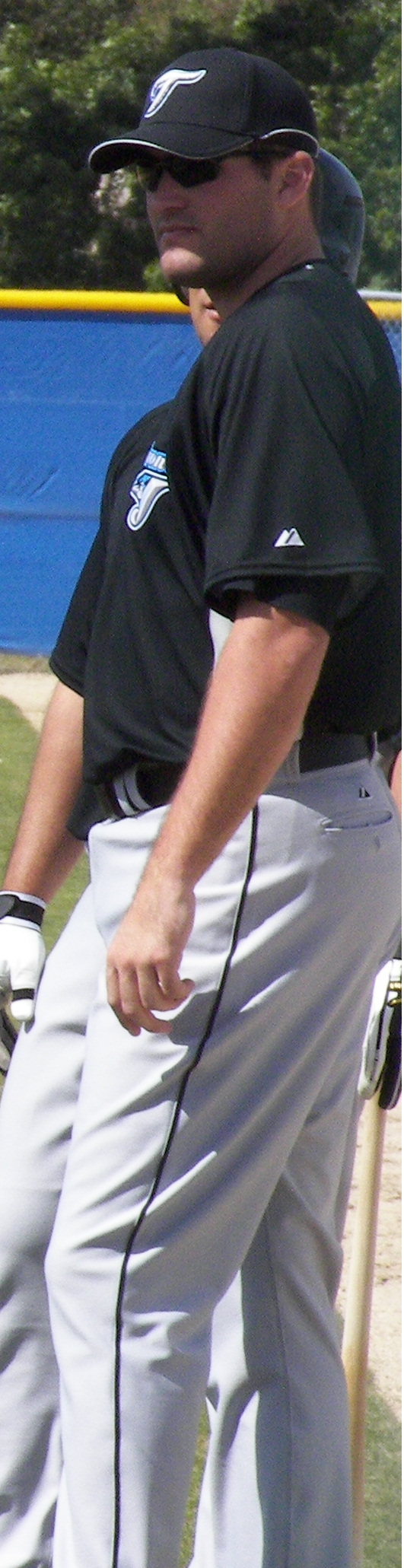
Glaus with the Blue Jays in 2007 spring training

After the 2005 season, Glaus was traded to the Toronto Blue Jays in the off-season along with minor league shortstop Sergio Santos. The trade sent pitcher Miguel Batista and second baseman Orlando Hudson to the Diamondbacks. The Jays badly needed a power bat a year after letting go of Carlos Delgado, however the emergence of Hudson at second base gave the statistical advantage of this trade to the Diamondbacks. Although Glaus was converted from shortstop to third base in the minors (and played 10 games at shortstop for the Angels), he started at shortstop for the Toronto Blue Jays against the Chicago White Sox on May 26, 2006, due to the demotion of shortstop Russ Adams. Glaus was not expected to do much fielding due to the fact the pitcher that day was known to induce many fly balls, instead of ground balls. This defensive alignment didn't affect his hitting, collecting two hits with a home run. Glaus made several starts at shortstop for the Blue Jays, usually when Toronto was facing National League opponents at their home ballpark, where there was no DH.

After hitting 38 home runs and 104 RBI in the 2006 season, Glaus earned a single 10th place vote for the 2006 American League MVP Award. In 2006, Glaus had the lowest zone rating of any Major League third baseman (.741). In 2007 Glaus' production was hampered all year by foot injuries and his production fell. On December 13, 2007, he was cited in the Mitchell Report.

=== St. Louis Cardinals ===
Glaus was traded to the St. Louis Cardinals in exchange for fellow third baseman Scott Rolen on January 14, 2008. This worked out well for the Cardinals, as Glaus did about as well as, or better than, his career rates in most offensive categories. Furthermore, Glaus committed only seven errors in 146 games and led the league with a .982 fielding percentage at 3B.

On September 3, 2008, he hit his 300th career home run off Doug Davis of the Arizona Diamondbacks in the third inning. He underwent arthroscopic right shoulder surgery on January 21, 2009. The Cardinals initially expected him to be ready around the start of 2009 season, but after a setback in his rehabilitation he was placed on the 15-day DL; after another reassessment the Cardinals announced that they did not expect him to return until June 2009. On July 11, 2009, he was assigned to the Palm Beach Cardinals of the Florida State League on a rehabilitation assignment. He returned September 2, against the Brewers in the bottom of the 6th inning.

=== Atlanta Braves ===
After an injury-shortened 2009 season with the St. Louis Cardinals, Glaus signed a one-year $1.75 million contract with the Atlanta Braves, a deal that allowed him to earn an additional $2.25 million in performance and roster bonuses. He became the starting first baseman in 2010. After a rough April in which he hit below the Mendoza Line, Glaus rebounded to become Player of the Month in May, hitting .330 with six home runs and 28 RBI. As of August 9, Glaus was hitting .242 with 14 home runs and 63 RBI.

Glaus's production faltered in July and August. After Atlanta acquired Derrek Lee on August 18 to play first base, Glaus was placed on the DL with knee fatigue. Glaus had a few setbacks, but returned to Atlanta in a back-up role behind Derrek Lee and rookie Freddie Freeman.

Glaus made only one appearance at third base during the regular season, but was used at third base in Game 2 of the NLDS against the San Francisco Giants, starting a key double play. Glaus then started Game 4 of the series at third base. He did not play in the 2011 season and considered himself retired.

== Coaching career ==
On June 3, 2025, Glaus was announced as a coach for the United States national under-18 baseball team's development program in Cary, North Carolina. On November 20, 2025, the Long Beach Coast of the Pioneer Baseball League announced that Glaus would join their staff as the hitting coach for their inaugural campaign in 2026 under manager and former Angels teammate Troy Percival.

== Personal life ==
Glaus and his wife, Ann, moved to San Diego in 2020 and they have a son. Troy Glaus appeared in a game for the Savannah Bananas on May 30, 2025 at Angel Stadium as a pinch hitter where he got a base hit single into left field. In July 2025, he served as a coach for the United States national under-18 baseball team's development program in Cary, North Carolina.

== See also ==
- List of Major League Baseball career assists as a third baseman leaders
- List of Major League Baseball career games played as a third baseman leaders
- List of Major League Baseball career home run leaders
- List of Major League Baseball players named in the Mitchell Report
- List of Olympic medalists in baseball
- Los Angeles Angels award winners and league leaders
