= 1997 College Baseball All-America Team =

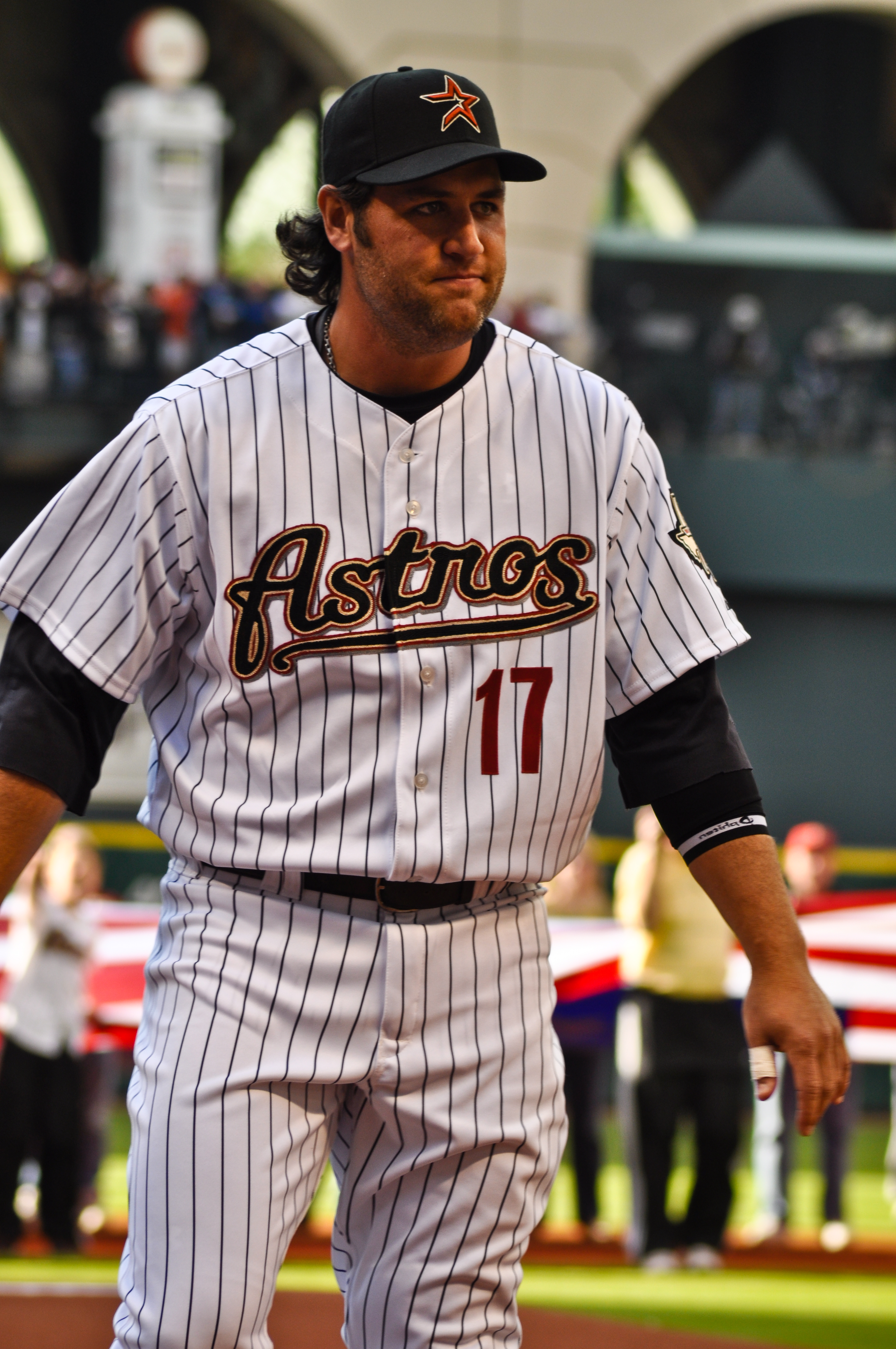
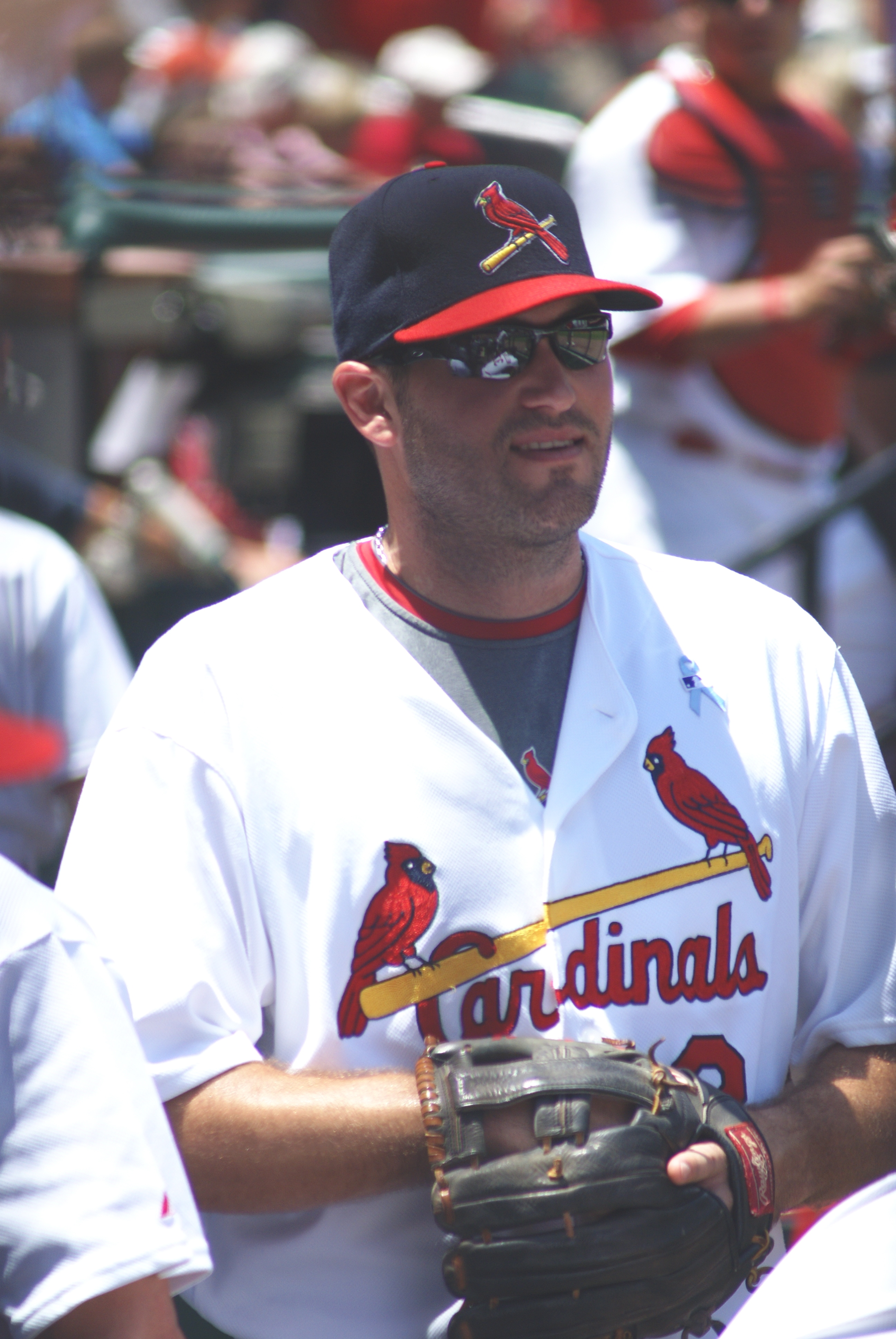
1997 All-Americans included six-time MLB All-Star Lance Berkman (left) and 2002 World Series MVP Troy Glaus (right).

This is a list of college baseball players named first team All-Americans for the 1997 NCAA Division I baseball season. In 1997, there were five generally recognized All-America selectors for baseball: the American Baseball Coaches Association, Baseball America, the Collegiate Baseball Newspaper, the National Collegiate Baseball Writers Association, and The Sporting News, which released a team for the first time since 1993. In order to be considered a "consensus" All-American, a player must have been selected by at least three of these.

== Key ==
A	American Baseball Coaches Association
B	Baseball America
C	Collegiate Baseball Newspaper
N	National Collegiate Baseball Writers Association
S	The Sporting News
	Member of the National College Baseball Hall of Fame
	Consensus All-American – selected by all five organizations
	Consensus All-American – selected by three or four organizations

== All-Americans ==
Position	Name	School	#	A	B	C	N	S	Other awards and honors
Starting pitcher	J. D. Arteaga	Miami (FL)	1	—	—	—	✓	—	
Starting pitcher	Patrick Coogan	LSU	1	—	—	—	✓	—	
Starting pitcher	Chris Enochs	West Virginia	2	✓	—	✓	—	—	
Starting pitcher	Jason Gooding	Texas Tech	4	✓	—	✓	✓	✓	
Starting pitcher	Jason Navarro	Tulane	3	✓	—	—	✓	✓	
Starting pitcher	Jim Parque	UCLA	2	—	✓	—	✓	—	
Starting pitcher	Kyle Peterson	Stanford	2	—	✓	—	✓	—	
Starting pitcher	Dan Reichert	Pacific	5	✓	✓	✓	✓	✓	
Starting pitcher	Jeff Weaver	Fresno State	2	—	✓	—	✓	—	
Starting pitcher	Randy Wolf	Pepperdine	1	—	—	—	✓	—	
Relief pitcher	Matt Anderson	Rice	5	✓	✓	✓	✓	✓	First overall pick in the 1997 MLB draft
Relief pitcher	Clay Eason	NC State	1	—	—	✓	—	—	
Relief pitcher	Ara Petrosian	Long Beach State	1	—	—	✓	—	—	
Catcher	Giuseppe Chiaramonte	Fresno State	3	✓	—	✓	✓	—	
Catcher	Javier Flores	Oklahoma	1	—	—	—	—	✓	
Catcher	Matthew LeCroy	Clemson	2	—	✓	—	✓	—	
First baseman	Lance Berkman	Rice	5	✓	✓	✓	✓	✓	
First baseman	Ross Gload	South Florida	1	—	—	—	✓	—	
Second baseman	Keith Ginter	Texas Tech	4	✓	—	✓	✓	✓	
Second baseman	Tom Sergio	NC State	2	—	✓	—	✓	—	
Shortstop	Adam Kennedy	Cal State Northridge	2	—	—	✓	✓	—	
Shortstop	Brandon Larson	LSU	4	✓	✓	—	✓	✓	College World Series Most Outstanding Player
Third baseman / DH	Pat Burrell	Miami (FL)	5	✓	✓	✓	✓	✓	
Third baseman	Joe Dillon	Texas Tech	2	—	—	—	✓	✓	
Third baseman	Troy Glaus	UCLA	2	—	✓	—	✓	—	
Outfielder	Casey Child	Pepperdine	1	—	—	—	✓	—	
Outfielder	J. D. Drew	Florida State	5	✓	✓	✓	✓	✓	Dick Howser Trophy Golden Spikes Award ABCA Player of the Year Baseball America Player of the Year Collegiate Baseball Player of the Year The Sporting News Player of the Year
Outfielder	Mark Fisher	Georgia Tech	1	—	—	—	—	✓	
Outfielder	Jeff Guiel	Oklahoma State	2	✓	—	✓	—	—	
Outfielder	Mike Marchiano	Fordham	3	✓	—	✓	✓	—	
Outfielder	Jeremy Morris	Florida State	3	—	✓	—	✓	✓	
Outfielder	Goefrey Tomlinson	Houston	1	—	—	—	✓	—	
Outfielder	Roberto Vaz	Alabama	3	✓	—	—	✓	✓	
Designated hitter	Ryan Bordenick	South Carolina	1	✓	—	—	—	—	
Utility player	Mike Frank	Santa Clara	1	—	—	✓	—	—	
Utility player	Tim Hudson	Auburn	5	✓	✓	✓	✓	✓	Rotary Smith Award
Utility player	Mark Maberry	Tennessee Tech	1	—	—	✓	—	—	
Utility player	Brad Wilkerson	Florida	2	—	✓	—	✓	—	
Utility player	Kris Wilson	Georgia Tech	1	—	—	—	✓	—	

== See also ==
- List of college baseball awards
