= All-Star Futures Game all-time roster =

Players in an American baseball game

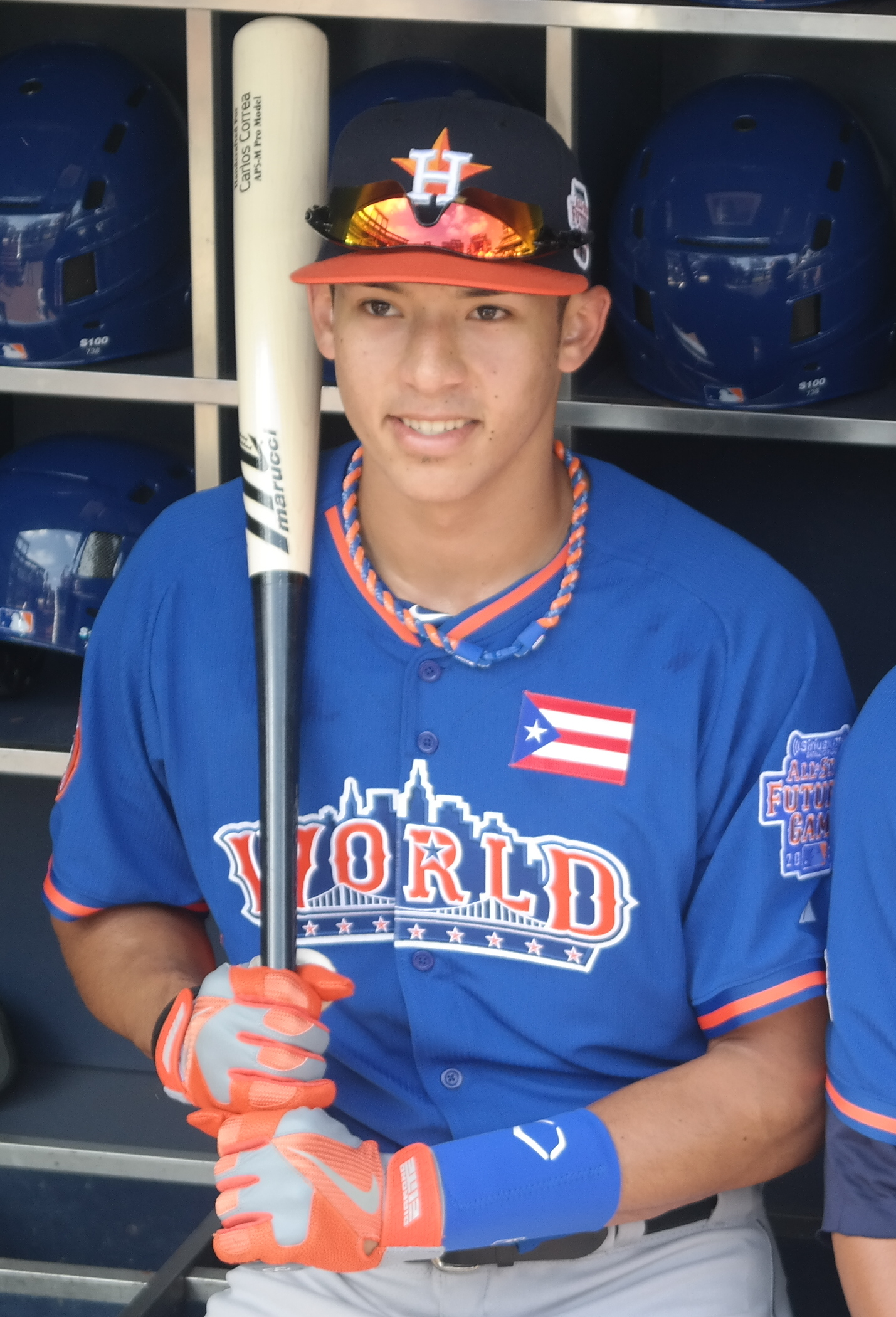
Carlos Correa at the 2013 All-Star Futures Game

The All-Star Futures Game is an annual baseball exhibition game hosted by Major League Baseball (MLB) as part of its midsummer All-Star Game festivities. From 1999 to 2018, a team of prospects from the United States (excluding Puerto Rico) competed against a team of prospects from other countries around the world and Puerto Rico. In 2019, the format shifted to a team of players from American League organizations against players from National League organizations. Over 800 players have been selected to participate in the All-Star Futures game since its first installment in 1999.

== United States team (1999–2018) ==
=== Pitchers ===
- (Maryland) Nick Adenhart (2006)
- (Louisiana) Kurt Ainsworth (2000)
- (Texas) Brett Anderson (2008)
- (Michigan) Ryan Anderson (1999–2000)
- (Florida) Shaun Anderson (2018)
- (Florida) Rick Ankiel (1999)
- (Texas) Mark Appel (2015)
- (Texas) Jake Arrieta (2008)
- (Texas) Homer Bailey (2006)
- (Vermont) Brad Baker (2002)
- (California) Collin Balester (2007)
- (Texas) Anthony Banda (2016)
- (Connecticut) Matt Barnes (2012)
- (California) Trevor Bauer (2012)
- (Texas) Josh Beckett (2000)
- (Massachusetts) Tyler Beede (2015)
- (California) Phil Bickford (2016)
- (Pennsylvania) Jesse Biddle (2013)
- (Florida) Christian Binford (2014)
- (Kentucky) Joe Blanton (2004)
- (Virginia) Travis Bowyer (2005)
- (Oklahoma) Archie Bradley (2013)
- (Florida) Bobby Bradley (2000)
- (California) Zach Britton (2010)
- (Texas) Clay Buchholz (2007)
- (Missouri) Mark Buehrle (2000)
- (Indiana) Bryan Bullington (2004)
- (North Carolina) Madison Bumgarner (2009)
- (Oklahoma) Dylan Bundy (2012)
- (Arkansas) A. J. Burnett (1999)
- (Florida) Sean Burnett (2002)
- (Texas) Beau Burrows (2017)
- (Virginia) Eddie Butler (2013)
- (Florida) Mike Bynum (2000)
- (California) Trevor Cahill (2008)
- (Alabama) Matt Cain (2004)
- (Georgia (U.S. state)) Dylan Cease (2018)
- (Nebraska) Joba Chamberlain (2007)
- (Louisiana) J. T. Chargois (2016)
- (Connecticut) Scott Chiasson (2001)
- (Florida) A. J. Cole (2013)
- (California) Gerrit Cole (2012)
- (Ohio) Aaron Cook (2002)
- (Kansas) Nate Cornejo (2001)
- (Texas) Jarred Cosart (2010–2011)
- (Illinois) Neal Cotts (2003)
- (Texas) Kyle Crick (2013)
- (Texas) John Danks (2004)
- (Arizona) Zach Davies (2015)
- (Louisiana) Thomas Diamond (2005)
- (Texas) Ryan Dittfurth (2002)
- (Texas) Kyle Drabek (2009)
- (California) Danny Duffy (2009)
- (Texas) Zach Duke (2005)
- (Texas) Jon Duplantier (2017)
- (Arizona) J. D. Durbin (2003)
- (South Carolina) C. J. Edwards (2015)
- (Oregon) Brett Evert (2002)
- (Texas) Clint Everts (2004)
- (California) Jack Flaherty (2017)
- (Maryland) Gavin Floyd (2003–2004)
- (Illinois) Christian Friedrich (2010)
- (Florida) Carson Fulmer (2016)
- (California) Amir Garrett (2015–2016)
- (California) Matt Garza (2007)
- (Indiana) Kyle Gibson (2011)
- (California) Lucas Giolito (2014–2015)
- (Colorado) Marco Gonzales (2014)
- (Florida) Gio González (2006)
- (Illinois) Tom Gorzelanny (2006)
- (California) Hunter Greene (2018)
- (Florida) Zack Greinke (2003)
- (Florida) Foster Griffin (2017)
- (New York (state)) Jason Grilli (1999)
- (South Carolina) Taylor Guerrieri (2013)
- (Maryland) Josh Hader (2016)
- (North Carolina) Hunter Harvey (2014)
- (Connecticut) Matt Harvey (2011)
- (Iowa) Jeremy Hellickson (2010)
- (Florida) Jimmy Herget (2017)
- (California) Jason Hirsh (2006)
- (Colorado) Luke Hochevar (2007)
- (New York (state)) Jeff Hoffman (2016)
- (Georgia (U.S. state)) Brent Honeywell (2017)
- (Tennessee) Dakota Hudson (2018)
- (Virginia) Daniel Hudson (2010)
- (California) Phil Hughes (2006)
- (Maryland) Danny Hultzen (2012)
- (Missouri) Eric Hurley (2006)
- (Virginia) Will Inman (2008)
- (Georgia (U.S. state)) Edwin Jackson (2003)
- (Pennsylvania) Zach Jackson (2005)
- (Idaho) Bobby Jenks (2005)
- (Nevada) Kevin Jepsen (2008)
- (Florida) Taylor Jordan (2013)
- (Ohio) Jimmy Journell (2002)
- (Washington (state)) Josh Karp (2002)
- (Iowa) Mitch Keller (2018)
- (Florida) Casey Kelly (2009)
- (Texas) Clayton Kershaw (2007)
- (Texas) Michael Kopech (2017)
- (New Hampshire) Chris Lambert (2005)
- (Illinois) Preston Larrison (2003)
- (Florida) Mat Latos (2009)
- (Pennsylvania) Anthony Lerew (2005)
- (Texas) Brad Lincoln (2009)
- (Idaho) Matt Lindstrom (2006)
- (California) Chuck Lofgren (2007)
- (South Carolina) Jordan Lyles (2010)
- (Florida) Triston McKenzie (2017)
- (Ohio) Michael Madsen (2007)
- (Mississippi) Paul Maholm (2005)
- (Virginia) John Maine (2003)
- (California) Matt Manning (2018)
- (California) Ryan Mattheus (2008)
- (Colorado) Brian Matusz (2009)
- (Washington (state)) Trevor May (2014)
- (Indiana) Alex Meyer (2012; 2014)
- (Texas) Adam Miller (2006)
- (Texas) Shelby Miller (2010–2011)
- (Tennessee) Mike Minor (2010)
- (Florida) Matt Moore (2011)
- (Illinois) Mark Mulder (1999)
- (California) Bill Murphy (2004)
- (California) Joe Musgrove (2016)
- (Florida) Brett Myers (2001–2002)
- (Ohio) Clint Nageotte (2003)
- (North Carolina) Chris Narveson (2003)
- (Florida) Jimmy Nelson (2013)
- (California) Nick Neugebauer (2001)
- (Massachusetts) Sean Newcomb (2015)
- (Texas) Jeff Niemann (2007)
- (Louisiana) Aaron Nola (2015)
- (Tennessee) Daniel Norris (2014)
- (Illinois) Jake Odorizzi (2012)
- (California) Garrett Olson (2007)
- (Ohio) Andy Oliver (2010)
- (California) Henry Owens (2014)
- (Indiana) Jarrod Parker (2009)
- (Texas) Troy Patton (2005)
- (Florida) Brad Peacock (2011)
- (Washington (state)) Josh Pearce (2001)
- (South Carolina) C. D. Pelham (2018)
- (Oklahoma) Brad Penny (1999)
- (Nebraska) Kyle Peterson (1999)
- (Tennessee) Drew Pomeranz (2011)
- (South Carolina) Kevin Pucetas (2008)
- (Iowa) A. J. Puk (2017)
- (California) Nick Pereira (2006)
- (New Jersey) Anthony Ranaudo (2013)
- (Iowa) Colin Rea (2015)
- (New Jersey) Trevor Reckling (2009)
- (Indiana) Clayton Richard (2008)
- (New York (state)) C. J. Riefenhauser (2013)
- (California) Matt Riley (1999)
- (California) Royce Ring (2003)
- (California) Grant Roberts (2000)
- (Louisiana) B. J. Ryan (1999)
- (California) CC Sabathia (2000)
- (California) Tanner Scheppers (2010)
- (Ohio) Tanner Scott (2017)
- (Louisiana) Ben Sheets (2000)
- (Tennessee) Justus Sheffield (2018)
- (Oregon) Braden Shipley (2014)
- (California) Tyler Skaggs (2011–2012)
- (Colorado) Kyle Sleeth (2004)
- (Ohio) Nate Smith (2016)
- (Washington (state)) Blake Snell (2015)
- (Delaware) Ian Snell (2005)
- (New York (state)) Tim Stauffer (2004)
- (Georgia (U.S. state)) Richard Stahl (2001)
- (Kansas) Ryne Stanek (2016)
- (California) Robert Stephenson (2014)
- (South Carolina) Billy Sylvester (2001)
- (Texas) Noah Syndergaard (2013–2014)
- (Texas) Jameson Taillon (2012)
- (Missouri) Dennis Tankersley (2001)
- (Nevada) Brad Thompson (2004)
- (Texas) Jake Thompson (2014)
- (Georgia (U.S. state)) Tyler Thornburg (2011)
- (Texas) Jess Todd (2008)
- (California) Billy Traber (2002)
- (Missouri) Jacob Turner (2011)
- (Ohio) John Van Benschoten (2003)
- (Virginia) Justin Verlander (2005)
- (Georgia (U.S. state)) Adam Wainwright (2002)
- (California) Taijuan Walker (2012–2013)
- (California) Casey Weathers (2008)
- (Texas) Kip Wells (1999)
- (Georgia (U.S. state)) Zack Wheeler (2010; 2012)
- (Texas) Forrest Whitley (2018)
- (Pennsylvania) Matt White (1999)
- (Hawaii) Jerome Williams (2001)
- (Alabama) Kyle Wright (2018)
- (California) Jason Young (2001–2002)
- (Nevada) Barry Zito (1999)
- (California) Joel Zumaya (2005)

=== Catchers ===
- (California) Bryan Anderson (2007–2008)
- (California) Rob Brantly (2012)
- (Utah) John Buck (2002)
- (Florida) Kevin Cash (2002)
- (California) Jason Castro (2009)
- (California) Giuseppe Chiaramonte (1999)
- (Florida) Zack Collins (2017)
- (California) Hank Conger (2010)
- (Georgia (U.S. state)) Kyle Farmer (2015)
- (Georgia (U.S. state)) Tyler Flowers (2009)
- (California) Ryan Garko (2005)
- (California) Toby Hall (2001)
- (California) Austin Hedges (2013)
- (Oklahoma) Koyie Hill (2004)
- (West Virginia) J. R. House (2001)
- (Rhode Island) Chris Iannetta (2005)
- (Virginia) Brandon Inge (2000)
- (Wisconsin) Danny Jansen (2018)
- (Arizona) Tommy Joseph (2012)
- (Oregon) Carson Kelly (2016)
- (Arizona) Lou Marson (2008)
- (Florida) Jeff Mathis (2003–2004)
- (Minnesota) Joe Mauer (2003)
- (California) James McCann (2013)
- (Pennsylvania) Devin Mesoraco (2011)
- (Ohio) Sean Murphy (2018)
- (Indiana) Justin O'Conner (2014)
- (Oregon) Ben Petrick (1999–2000)
- (Indiana) Josh Phegley (2013)
- (Indiana) Kevin Plawecki (2014)
- (California) Austin Romine (2010–2011)
- (Florida) Tony Sanchez (2010)
- (Ohio) Kyle Schwarber (2015)
- (California) Chance Sisco (2016–2017)
- (Hawaii) Kurt Suzuki (2006)
- (Texas) Taylor Teagarden (2008)
- (Texas) J. R. Towles (2007)
- (Pennsylvania) Neil Walker (2006)
- (Alabama) Josh Willingham (2005)

=== Infielders ===
- (Florida) Pete Alonso (2018)
- (New York (state)) Pedro Álvarez (2009)
- (Oklahoma) Brian Anderson (2017)
- (California) Nolan Arenado (2011–2012)
- (Louisiana) Michael Aubrey (2004)
- (Texas) Josh Barfield (2003; 2005)
- (California) Daric Barton (2005)
- (Texas) Josh Bell (2014–2015)
- (Tennessee) Mookie Betts (2014)
- (Florida) Bo Bichette (2017–2018)
- (New Mexico) Alex Bregman (2016)
- (Nevada) Kris Bryant (2014)
- (California) Hank Blalock (2001)
- (Virginia) Brian Bocock (2007)
- (California) Ryan Braun (2006)
- (Georgia (U.S. state)) Russell Branyan (1999)
- (Kentucky) Chris Burke (2003–2004)
- (California) Pat Burrell (1999)
- (California) Sean Burroughs (2000–2001)
- (North Carolina) Brent Butler (2001)
- (California) Willie Calhoun (2016)
- (Florida) Adrian Cárdenas (2007)
- (Nevada) Chris Carter (2009)
- (Florida) Nick Castellanos (2012)
- (Louisiana) Garin Cecchini (2013)
- (North Carolina) Lonnie Chisenhall (2010)
- (Florida) Chris Coghlan (2007)
- (Pennsylvania) Sean Coyle (2014)
- (California) J. P. Crawford (2014–2015)
- (Arizona) C. J. Cron (2013)
- (Virginia) Michael Cuddyer (1999)
- (Florida) Drew Cumberland (2010)
- (Connecticut) Jamie D'Antona (2008)
- (California) Chase d'Arnaud (2011–2012)
- (California) James Darnell (2011)
- (California) Matt Davidson (2013)
- (Texas) Chris Davis (2008)
- (South Carolina) Travis Dawkins (2000)
- (Georgia (U.S. state)) Travis Demeritte (2016)
- (Georgia (U.S. state)) Delino DeShields Jr. (2013)
- (California) Jason Donald (2008)
- (Texas) Hunter Dozier (2016)
- (Illinois) Kelly Dransfeldt (1999)
- (Georgia (U.S. state)) Stephen Drew (2006)
- (California) Danny Espinosa (2009–2010)
- (Florida) Prince Fielder (2004)
- (Oklahoma) Josh Fields (2006)
- (Nevada) Joey Gallo (2013–2014)
- (Florida) Mat Gamel (2008)
- (Ohio) Scooter Gennett (2012)
- (Michigan) Chris Getz (2008)
- (California) Marcus Giles (2000)
- (Texas) Paul Goldschmidt (2011)
- (California) Adrián González (2001)
- (Nebraska) Alex Gordon (2006)
- (Florida) Dee Gordon (2010)
- (Florida) Nick Gordon (2017)
- (California) Grant Green (2010–2011)
- (Florida) Khalil Greene (2003)
- (Mississippi) Bill Hall (2002)
- (Arizona) J. J. Hardy (2003)
- (Kentucky) Corey Hart (2002)
- (Texas) Ke'Bryan Hayes (2018)
- (California) Ryon Healy (2016)
- (California) Drew Henson (2000; 2002)
- (California) Aaron Hill (2004)
- (California) Keston Hiura (2018)
- (Tennessee) Wes Hodges (2008)
- (California) Rhys Hoskins (2017)
- (Florida) Eric Hosmer (2010)
- (Missouri) Ryan Howard (2003)
- (South Carolina) Orlando Hudson (2002)
- (California) Nick Johnson (1999; 2001)
- (Tennessee) Tony Kemp (2015)
- (Georgia (U.S. state)) Carter Kieboom (2018)
- (Arizona) Scott Kingery (2017)
- (Illinois) Jason Kipnis (2011)
- (Virginia) Joe Koshansky (2006)
- (Florida) Howie Kendrick (2006)
- (California) Adam Kennedy (1999)
- (Florida) Matt LaPorta (2008)
- (Kansas) Adam LaRoche (2003)
- (Kansas) Andy LaRoche (2005)
- (Louisiana) Joe Lawrence (1999)
- (Washington (state)) Brent Lillibridge (2007)
- (California) Evan Longoria (2007)
- (Georgia (U.S. state)) Nathaniel Lowe (2018)
- (Florida) Manny Machado (2011–2012)
- (California) Ryan McMahon (2017)
- (North Carolina) Dallas McPherson (2004)
- (Texas) Will Middlebrooks (2011)
- (Florida) Brad Miller (2013)
- (California) Scott Moore (2005)
- (Louisiana) Logan Morrison (2010)
- (Florida) Ryan Mountcastle (2018)
- (California) Mike Moustakas (2010)
- (California) Eric Munson (2000)
- (Indiana) Micah Johnson (2014)
- (Florida) Peter O'Brien (2014)
- (Georgia (U.S. state)) Matt Olson (2015)
- (Washington (state)) Lyle Overbay (2002)
- (South Carolina) Chris Owings (2013)
- (Georgia (U.S. state)) Eric Patterson (2006)
- (Florida) Steve Pearce (2007)
- (Texas) Cliff Pennington (2008)
- (Arizona) D. J. Peterson (2014)
- (Georgia (U.S. state)) Brandon Phillips (2002)
- (Arizona) Cody Ransom (2001)
- (Alabama) Colby Rasmus (2007)
- (Florida) Brendan Rodgers (2017–2018)
- (Florida) Jason Romano (2000)
- (Florida) Addison Russell (2013)
- (Florida) Marcus Sanders (2005)
- (North Carolina) Corey Seager (2014)
- (Tennessee) Nick Senzel (2017)
- (North Carolina) Richie Shaffer (2015)
- (California) Jon Singleton (2012)
- (Virginia) Scott Sizemore (2009)
- (California) Dominic Smith (2016)
- (California) Ian Stewart (2007)
- (Texas) Jason Stokes (2002)
- (Texas) Trevor Story (2015)
- (Georgia (U.S. state)) Dansby Swanson (2016)
- (North Carolina) Chad Tracy (2002)
- (California) Troy Tulowitzki (2006)
- (Florida) Trea Turner (2015)
- (Virginia) B. J. Upton (2004–2005)
- (Virginia) Justin Upton (2007)
- (California) Chase Utley (2001)
- (California) Chris Valaika (2008)
- (California) Josh Vitters (2009)
- (Pennsylvania) Christian Walker (2013)
- (California) Brett Wallace (2009)
- (Florida) Jemile Weeks (2009)
- (Florida) Rickie Weeks Jr. (2004)
- (Texas) Johnny Whittleman (2007)
- (Hawaii) Kolten Wong (2012–2013)
- (Texas) Brandon Wood (2005)
- (Virginia) David Wright (2004)
- (Ohio) Kevin Youkilis (2003)
- (New Jersey) Eric Young Jr. (2009)

=== Outfielders ===
- (Kentucky) Jo Adell (2018)
- (Georgia (U.S. state)) Tyler Austin (2012)
- (Ohio) Andrew Benintendi (2016)
- (Massachusetts) Peter Bergeron (1999)
- (Texas) Lance Berkman (1999)
- (California) Joe Borchard (2001–2002)
- (Florida) Lewis Brinson (2017)
- (New York (state)) Dee Brown (1999)
- (Florida) Domonic Brown (2010)
- (California) Gary Brown (2011)
- (Texas) Jay Bruce (2007)
- (Washington (state)) Travis Buck (2006)
- (Florida) Billy Butler (2006)
- (Georgia (U.S. state)) Byron Buxton (2013)
- (Georgia (U.S. state)) Marlon Byrd (2002)
- (Texas) Michael Choice (2012)
- (Texas) Carl Crawford (2002)
- (Washington (state)) Michael Conforto (2015)
- (Arizona) Dylan Cozens (2016)
- (New Jersey) Jack Cust (2000)
- (Alabama) David Dahl (2016)
- (Texas) Adam Dunn (2001)
- (Oregon) Jacoby Ellsbury (2007)
- (Pennsylvania) Derek Fisher (2017)
- (Georgia (U.S. state)) Dexter Fowler (2008)
- (Georgia (U.S. state)) Jeff Francoeur (2005)
- (Georgia (U.S. state)) Clint Frazier (2016)
- (Texas) Greg Golson (2008)
- (California) Anthony Gose (2012)
- (Mississippi) Billy Hamilton (2012–2013)
- (North Carolina) Josh Hamilton (2000)
- (Nevada) Bryce Harper (2011)
- (Pennsylvania) Chris Heisey (2009)
- (Georgia (U.S. state)) Jeremy Hermida (2005)
- (Georgia (U.S. state)) Jason Heyward (2009)
- (California) Brett Jackson (2010)
- (California) Conor Jackson (2004–2005)
- (Alabama) Desmond Jennings (2009)
- (Texas) Daryl Jones (2009)
- (California) Aaron Judge (2015)
- (Pennsylvania) Alex Kirilloff (2018)
- (Georgia (U.S. state)) David Kelton (2003)
- (Ohio) Dave Krynzel (2003)
- (California) Jason Kubel (2004)
- (California) Jason Lane (2001)
- (Georgia (U.S. state)) Kyle Lewis (2018)
- (Nevada) Ryan Ludwick (2001)
- (New Jersey) Val Majewski (2004)
- (North Carolina) Cameron Maybin (2006–2007)
- (Florida) Andrew McCutchen (2008)
- (Georgia (U.S. state)) Austin Meadows (2016)
- (Florida) Lastings Milledge (2005)
- (North Carolina) Wil Myers (2011–2012)
- (Wyoming) Brandon Nimmo (2013, 2015)
- (Connecticut) Mike Olt (2012)
- (Georgia (U.S. state)) Corey Patterson (1999–2000)
- (California) Joc Pederson (2013)
- (Texas) Hunter Pence (2006)
- (Georgia (U.S. state)) James Ramsey (2014)
- (Illinois) Corey Ray (2017)
- (Rhode Island) Buddy Reed (2018)
- (California) Jeremy Reed (2004)
- (Mississippi) Hunter Renfroe (2014; 2016)
- (Tennessee) Bryan Reynolds (2017)
- (Pennsylvania) Nolan Reimold (2006)
- (Minnesota) Michael Restovich (2002)
- (Georgia (U.S. state)) Ben Revere (2010)
- (California) Nate Schierholtz (2008)
- (Washington (state)) Grady Sizemore (2003)
- (Oklahoma) Stephen Smitherman (2003)
- (Florida) Denard Span (2008)
- (Connecticut) George Springer (2013)
- (California) Giancarlo Stanton (2009)
- (Georgia (U.S. state)) Christin Stewart (2016)
- (California) Jamal Strong (2001)
- (New Jersey) Matt Szczur (2011)
- (Florida) Michael A. Taylor (2014)
- (Florida) Joey Terdoslavich (2013)
- (Georgia (U.S. state)) Taylor Trammell (2018)
- (New Jersey) Mike Trout (2010–2011)
- (Florida) Kyle Tucker (2017)
- (Florida) Kyle Waldrop (2015)
- (Texas) Vernon Wells (1999–2000)
- (Kentucky) Brad Wilkerson (2000)
- (Texas) Nick Williams (2015)
- (Florida) Jesse Winker (2014)
- (California) Christian Yelich (2012–2013)
- (Texas) Chris Young (2005)
- (California) Delmon Young (2004–2005)
- (California) Bradley Zimmer (2015)

== World team (1999–2018) ==
=== Pitchers ===
- (Dominican Republic) Domingo Acevedo (2017)
- (Dominican Republic) Alfonso Alcantara (2014)
- (Dominican Republic) Edwin Almonte (2002)
- (Dominican Republic) Miguel Almonte (2013)
- (Venezuela) Henderson Álvarez (2010–2011)
- (Cuba) Yadier Álvarez (2017)
- (Australia) Craig Anderson (2000)
- (Venezuela) Tony Armas Jr. (1999)
- (Canada) Phillippe Aumont (2008)
- (Cuba) Danys Báez (2000)
- (Australia) Grant Balfour (2001)
- (Mexico) Manny Banuelos (2009)
- (Panama) Jaime Barría (2017)
- (Dominican Republic) Denny Bautista (2003)
- (Dominican Republic) Pedro Beato (2007)
- (Canada) Érik Bédard (2001–2002)
- (Dominican Republic) Francis Beltrán (2002)
- (Puerto Rico) José Berríos (2014–2015)
- (Australia) Travis Blackley (2003)
- (Dominican Republic) Lisalverto Bonilla (2012)
- (Dominican Republic) Edwar Cabrera (2012)
- (Puerto Rico) Fernando Cabrera (2005)
- (Dominican Republic) José Capellán (2004)
- (Venezuela) Carlos Carrasco (2006–2008)
- (Dominican Republic) Santiago Casilla (2004)
- (Dominican Republic) Simón Castro (2010)
- (Venezuela) Jhoulys Chacín (2009)
- (Dominican Republic) Carlos Contreras (2013)
- (Dominican Republic) Francisco Cordero (1999)
- (United States Virgin Islands) Jharel Cotton (2016)
- (Dominican Republic) Juan Cruz (2001)
- (Mexico) Jorge de la Rosa (2002–2003)
- (Dominican Republic) Enyel De Los Santos (2018)
- (Dominican Republic) Fautino de los Santos (2007)
- (Venezuela) Jesús Delgado (2008)
- (Dominican Republic) Rafael De Paula (2013)
- (Puerto Rico) Edwin Díaz (2015)
- (Mexico) Randey Dorame (2000)
- (Venezuela) Edwin Escobar (2014)
- (Colombia) Luis Escobar (2017)
- (Dominican Republic) Jeurys Familia (2010)
- (Dominican Republic) Michael Feliz (2014)
- (Dominican Republic) Neftalí Feliz (2009)
- (Cuba) José Fernández (2012)
- (Dominican Republic) Yohan Flande (2009)
- (Canada) Jeff Francis (2004)
- (Colombia) Emiliano Fruto (2007)
- (Mexico) Yovani Gallardo (2006)
- (Mexico) Gerardo García (2002)
- (Mexico) Jaime García (2006; 2008)
- (Dominican Republic) Jarlin García (2015)
- (Dominican Republic) José García (2006)
- (Dominican Republic) Domingo Germán (2014)
- (Dominican Republic) Franklyn Germán (2002)
- (Mexico) Édgar González (2003)
- (Venezuela) Juan González (2015)
- (Venezuela) Deolis Guerra (2007)
- (Colombia) Tayron Guerrero (2014, 2017)
- (Dominican Republic) Jorge Guzmán (2018)
- (Canada) Rich Harden (2003)
- (Australia) Liam Hendriks (2010–2011)
- (Venezuela) Carlos Hernández (2000–2001)
- (Venezuela) Félix Hernández (2004)
- (United States) Jonathan Hernández (2017)
- (Dominican Republic) Fausto Carmona (2004–2005)
- (Venezuela) Alex Herrera (2001)
- (Dominican Republic) Kelvin Herrera (2011)
- (Canada) Shawn Hill (2003)
- (Taiwan) Chih-Wei Hu (2016)
- (Taiwan) Wei-Chieh Huang (2015)
- (Venezuela) Gregory Infante (2011)
- (Puerto Rico) Joe Jiménez (2015–2016)
- (South Korea) Sun-woo Kim (1999–2000)
- (Dominican Republic) Jairo Labourt (2015, 2017)
- (Venezuela) Wilfredo Ledezma (2004)
- (Taiwan) C. C. Lee (2013)
- (Cuba) Serguey Linares (2007)
- (Dominican Republic) Francisco Liriano (2002; 2005)
- (Dominican Republic) Radhames Liz (2006)
- (Taiwan) Chia-Jen Lo (2009)
- (Canada) Adam Loewen (2005)
- (Puerto Rico) Jorge López (2014)
- (Dominican Republic) Reynaldo López (2016)
- (Cuba) Yoan López (2018)
- (Canada) Kyle Lotzkar (2012)
- (South Africa) Kieran Lovegrove (2018)
- (Peru) Jesús Luzardo (2018)
- (Venezuela) Bryan Mata (2018)
- (Canada) Trystan Magnuson (2010)
- (Dominican Republic) Jhan Mariñez (2011)
- (Dominican Republic) Carlos Martínez (2011)
- (Venezuela) Edgar R. Martínez (2006)
- (Curaçao) Shairon Martis (2008)
- (Canada) Scott Mathieson (2005)
- (Canada) Chris Mears (1999)
- (Dominican Republic) Adalberto Mejía (2016)
- (Dominican Republic) Jenrry Mejía (2009)
- (Dominican Republic) Keury Mella (2015)
- (Dominican Republic) Frankie Montas (2014–2015)
- (Dominican Republic) Rafael Montero (2013)
- (Venezuela) Franklin Morales (2007)
- (Dominican Republic) Juan Morillo (2005)
- (Cuba) Eduardo Morlan (2008)
- (Dominican Republic) Arnie Muñoz (2004)
- (Canada) Aaron Myette (1999–2000)
- (Lithuania) Dovydas Neverauskas (2016)
- (Venezuela) Fernando Nieve (2005)
- (Dominican Republic) Héctor Noesí (2010)
- (Japan) Tomo Ohka (1999–2000)
- (Dominican Republic) Ramón Ortiz (1999–2000)
- (Canada) James Paxton (2011)
- (Dominican Republic) Ariel Peña (2012)
- (Dominican Republic) Juan Peña (2001)
- (Dominican Republic) Ángel Perdomo (2016)
- (Dominican Republic) Luis Perdomo (2015)
- (Dominican Republic) Luis Pérez (2009)
- (Venezuela) Martín Pérez (2011)
- (Dominican Republic) Juan Pérez (2004)
- (Venezuela) Yusmeiro Petit (2004–2005)
- (Dominican Republic) Julio Pimentel (2008)
- (Dominican Republic) Stolmy Pimentel (2010)
- (Puerto Rico) Joel Piñeiro (2001)
- (Venezuela) Ricardo Pinto (2016)
- (Australia) Luke Prokopec (1999)
- (Canada) Cal Quantrill (2017)
- (United Kingdom) Chris Reed (2012)
- (United States) Alex Reyes (2015–2016)
- (Brazil) André Rienzo (2013)
- (Mexico) Francisco Ríos (2016)
- (Venezuela) Felipe Rivero (2012)
- (Venezuela) Eduardo Rodríguez (2013)
- (Venezuela) Francisco Rodríguez (2002)
- (Venezuela) Henry Rodríguez (2008)
- (Dominican Republic) Ricardo Rodríguez (2001–2002)
- (Venezuela) Wilfredo Rodríguez (2000)
- (Panama) Davis Romero (2006)
- (Dominican Republic) Enny Romero (2012–2014)
- (Puerto Rico) J. C. Romero (1999)
- (Venezuela) Bruce Rondón (2012)
- (South Korea) Jae Kuk Ryu (2006)
- (Mexico) Fernando Salas (2008)
- (Dominican Republic) Juan Salas (2006)
- (Venezuela) Aníbal Sánchez (2005)
- (Venezuela) Eduardo Sánchez (2010)
- (Dominican Republic) Humberto Sánchez (2006)
- (Dominican Republic) Ervin Santana (2003)
- (South Korea) Jae Seo (2001)
- (Dominican Republic) Leyson Séptimo (2009)
- (Dominican Republic) Wascar Serrano (1999)
- (Dominican Republic) Luis Severino (2014)
- (Venezuela) Carlos Silva (2000)
- (South Korea) Seung Song (2001–2003)
- (Canada) Mike Soroka (2017)
- (Dominican Republic) Henry Sosa (2007)
- (Australia) John Stephens (2002)
- (Curaçao) J. C. Sulbaran (2009)
- (Australia) Lewis Thorpe (2018)
- (Colombia) Julio Teherán (2010–2011)
- (Australia) Brad Thomas (2001)
- (Australia) Rich Thompson (2007)
- (Venezuela) Jesús Tinoco (2018)
- (Dominican Republic) Polin Trinidad (2008)
- (Taiwan) Chin-hui Tsao (2000; 2003)
- (South Africa) Dylan Unsworth (2016)
- (Mexico) Julio Urías (2014)
- (Dominican Republic) Merkin Valdéz (2003–2005)
- (Canada) Philippe Valiquette (2010)
- (Dominican Republic) José Valverde (2001)
- (Netherlands) Rick van den Hurk (2007)
- (Dominican Republic) Yordano Ventura (2012–2013)
- (Brazil) Thyago Vieira (2017)
- (Dominican Republic) Arodys Vizcaíno (2011)
- (Dominican Republic) Edinson Vólquez (2005)
- (Taiwan) Chien-Ming Wang (2003)
- (Australia) Alex Wells (2018)
- (Dominican Republic) Michael Ynoa (2013)

=== Catchers ===
- (Colombia) Jorge Alfaro (2013–2014)
- (Panama) Miguel Amaya (2018)
- (Panama) Christian Bethancourt (2012–2013)
- (Puerto Rico) Javier Cardona (1999)
- (Dominican Republic) Welington Castillo (2008)
- (Puerto Rico) Ramón Castro (2000)
- (Taiwan) Chun Chen (2010)
- (Mexico) Humberto Cota (2001)
- (Venezuela) Elías Díaz (2015)
- (Dominican Republic) Robinzon Díaz (2004, 2007)
- (Cuba) Yasmani Grandal (2012)
- (Puerto Rico) A. J. Jiménez (2013–2014)
- (Canada) George Kottaras (2006)
- (Dominican Republic) César King (1999)
- (Venezuela) Salomón Manríquez (2006)
- (Canada) Russell Martin (2005)
- (Venezuela) Víctor Martínez (2002)
- (Dominican Republic) Francisco Mejía (2016–2018)
- (Venezuela) Jesús Montero (2008–2009)
- (Venezuela) Miguel Montero (2005)
- (Venezuela) Dioner Navarro (2004)
- (Puerto Rico) Tomás Nido (2017)
- (Dominican Republic) Miguel Olivo (2000)
- (Venezuela) Guillermo Quiróz (2003)
- (Venezuela) Max Ramírez (2007–2008)
- (Puerto Rico) Mike Rivera (2001)
- (Dominican Republic) Wilin Rosario (2010–2011)
- (Venezuela) Keibert Ruiz (2018)
- (Dominican Republic) Gary Sánchez (2015–2016)
- (Dominican Republic) Carlos Santana (2009)
- (Mexico) Alí Solís (2012)
- (Puerto Rico) Geovany Soto (2007)
- (Mexico) Sebastián Valle (2011)
- (Puerto Rico) Christian Vázquez (2014)

=== Infielders ===
- (Dominican Republic) Willy Adames (2016)
- (Venezuela) Jesús Aguilar (2012)
- (Curaçao) Ozzie Albies (2015)
- (Venezuela) Jose Altuve (2011)
- (Dominican Republic) Arismendy Alcántara (2013)
- (Cuba) Yordan Alvarez (2017–2018)
- (Mexico) Alfredo Amézaga (2001)
- (Venezuela) Elvis Andrus (2007–2008)
- (Dominican Republic) Joaquín Arias (2006)
- (Venezuela) Orlando Arcia (2015)
- (Venezuela) Carlos Asuaje (2016)
- (Dominican Republic) Pedro Báez (2009–2010)
- (Puerto Rico) Javier Báez (2014)
- (Venezuela) William Bergolla (2005)
- (Dominican Republic) Ángel Berroa (2001–2002)
- (Cuba) Yuniesky Betancourt (2005)
- (Dominican Republic) Wilson Betemit (2001)
- (Venezuela) Andrés Blanco (2004)
- (Aruba) Xander Bogaerts (2012–2013)
- (Dominican Republic) Emilio Bonifacio (2008)
- (Venezuela) Miguel Cabrera (2001–2002)
- (New Zealand) Scott Campbell (2008)
- (Dominican Republic) Jeimer Candelario (2016)
- (Cuba) Bárbaro Cañizares (2009)
- (Dominican Republic) Robinson Canó (2003–2004)
- (Venezuela) José Castillo (1999; 2003)
- (Dominican Republic) Starlin Castro (2009)
- (Taiwan) Yung Chi Chen (2006)
- (South Korea) Hee-seop Choi (2002)
- (South Korea) Ji-man Choi (2013)
- (Dominican Republic) Pedro Ciriaco (2010)
- (Puerto Rico) Carlos Correa (2013–2014)
- (Mexico) Jesús Cota (2004)
- (Mexico) Luis Cruz (2006)
- (Dominican Republic) Rafael Devers (2015, 2017)
- (Mexico) Erubiel Durazo (1999)
- (Puerto Rico) Iván DeJesús Jr. (2008)
- (Dominican Republic) Víctor Díaz (2002)
- (Cuba) Yandy Díaz (2016)
- (Honduras) Mauricio Dubón (2017)
- (Mexico) Germán Durán (2007)
- (Dominican Republic) Edwin Encarnación (2003–2005)
- (Venezuela) Alcides Escobar (2007, 2009)
- (Cuba) Yunel Escobar (2006)
- (Venezuela) Wilmer Flores (2009; 2012)
- (The Bahamas) Lucius Fox (2017)
- (Dominican Republic) Juan Francisco (2008)
- (Dominican Republic) Maikel Franco (2013–2014)
- (Dominican Republic) Rafael Furcal (1999)
- (Mexico) Luis García (2001)
- (Dominican Republic) Luis García (2018)
- (Canada) Tyson Gillies (2009)
- (Venezuela) Andrés Giménez (2018)
- (Dominican Republic) Alexis Gómez (1999; 2003)
- (Puerto Rico) Rubén Gotay (2004)
- (Canada) Vladimir Guerrero Jr. (2017)
- (Dominican Republic) Joel Guzmán (2004; 2006)
- (Dominican Republic) Ronald Guzmán (2016)
- (Guam) John Hattig (2005)
- (Colombia) Dilson Herrera (2013; 2016)
- (Dominican Republic) Rosell Herrera (2014)
- (Taiwan) Chin-lung Hu (2006–2007)
- (Australia) Justin Huber (2002–2003; 2005)
- (Australia) Luke Hughes (2008)
- (Venezuela) Omar Infante (2002)
- (Venezuela) Hernán Iribarren (2005)
- (Dominican Republic) Luis Jiménez (2010)
- (Germany) Max Kepler (2015)
- (Canada) Pete Laforest (1999)
- (Canada) Brett Lawrie (2009–2010)
- (South Korea) Hak-ju Lee (2010–2011)
- (Canada) Jordan Lennerton (2013)
- (Puerto Rico) José León (2000)
- (Italy) Alex Liddi (2009–2011)
- (Puerto Rico) Francisco Lindor (2012–2014)
- (Puerto Rico) Felipe López (2000–2001)
- (Venezuela) José López (2002)
- (Dominican Republic) Dawel Lugo (2018)
- (Dominican Republic) Andy Marte (2003–2004)
- (Dominican Republic) Jefry Marté (2011)
- (Dominican Republic) Ketel Marte (2015)
- (Venezuela) Francisco Martinez (2011)
- (Puerto Rico) Ozzie Martínez (2010)
- (Dominican Republic) Jorge Mateo (2016)
- (Cuba) Yoán Moncada (2016)
- (Dominican Republic) Adalberto Mondesí (2015)
- (Cuba) Kendrys Morales (2005)
- (Canada) Justin Morneau (2002; 2004)
- (Canada) Josh Naylor (2016)
- (Dominican Republic) Ramón Nivar (1999; 2003)
- (Venezuela) Renato Núñez (2014–2015)
- (Dominican Republic) Pablo Ozuna (1999)
- (Taiwan) Chih-Fang Pan (2012)
- (Dominican Republic) Carlos Peña (2000–2001)
- (Mexico) Ramiro Peña (2008)
- (Venezuela) José Peraza (2014)
- (United States Virgin Islands) Calvin Pickering (1999)
- (Curaçao) Jurickson Profar (2011–2012)
- (Dominican Republic) Aramis Ramírez (1999)
- (Dominican Republic) Hanley Ramírez (2005)
- (Dominican Republic) José Reyes (2002)
- (Venezuela) José Rondón (2014)
- (Dominican Republic) Amed Rosario (2016)
- (Venezuela) Rubén Salazar (2000)
- (Venezuela) Carlos Sánchez (2012)
- (Mexico) Freddy Sandoval (2007)
- (Venezuela) Pablo Sandoval (2006; 2008)
- (Dominican Republic) Miguel Sanó (2013)
- (Curaçao) Jonathan Schoop (2011)
- (Dominican Republic) Jean Segura (2012)
- (Dominican Republic) Alfonso Soriano (1999)
- (Saudi Arabia) Craig Stansberry (2007)
- (Netherlands) Evert-Jan 't Hoen (1999)
- (Dominican Republic) Fernando Tatis Jr. (2018)
- (Canada) Scott Thorman (1999)
- (Mexico) Luis Urías (2018)
- (New Zealand) Travis Wilson (2000)
- (Puerto Rico) Kennys Vargas (2014)
- (Cuba) Dayán Viciedo (2009; 2011)
- (Dominican Republic) Angel Villalona (2008–2009)
- (Canada) Joey Votto (2006–2007)
- (Panama) Julio Zuleta (2000)

=== Outfielders ===
- (Venezuela) Ronald Acuña (2017)
- (Cuba) Yonder Alonso (2010–2011)
- (Cuba) Dariel Álvarez (2014)
- (Venezuela) Tony Álvarez (2002)
- (Venezuela) Oswaldo Arcia (2012)
- (Cuba) Randy Arozarena (2018)
- (Dominican Republic) Yeison Asencio (2013)
- (Venezuela) Luis Alexander Basabe (2018)
- (Curaçao) Wladimir Balentien (2006–2007)
- (Dominican Republic) Tony Blanco (2004)
- (Dominican Republic) Jorge Bonifacio (2016)
- (Dominican Republic) Socrates Brito (2015)
- (Dominican Republic) Melky Cabrera (2005)
- (Taiwan) Chin-Feng Chen (1999–2000)
- (Taiwan) Chih-Hsien Chiang (2011)
- (South Korea) Shin-Soo Choo (2002; 2004–2005)
- (Panama) Jorge Cortés (2004)
- (Dominican Republic) Nelson Cruz (2005)
- (Venezuela) Frank Díaz (2005)
- (Cuba) Yusniel Díaz (2018)
- (Panama) Luis Durango (2009)
- (Venezuela) Alex Escobar (2000–2001)
- (Dominican Republic) Estevan Florial (2017)
- (Puerto Rico) Rey Fuentes (2011; 2013)
- (Venezuela) Jesús Galindo (2013)
- (Brazil) Anderson Gomes (2006)
- (Venezuela) Carlos González (2006–2007)
- (Venezuela) Franklin Gutiérrez (2003)
- (South Korea) Jae-hoon Ha (2012)
- (Venezuela) Gorkys Hernández (2007–2008; 2010)
- (Dominican Republic) Eloy Jiménez (2016–2017)
- (South Korea) Kyeong Kang (2009)
- (Taiwan) Che-hsuan Lin (2008)
- (Dominican Republic) Rymer Liriano (2012)
- (Dominican Republic) Manuel Margot (2015–2016)
- (Dominican Republic) Alfredo Marte (2012)
- (Dominican Republic) Starling Marte (2011)
- (Dominican Republic) Seuly Matias (2018)
- (Dominican Republic) Fernando Martínez (2007–2008)
- (Dominican Republic) Nomar Mazara (2015)
- (Venezuela) Jackson Melián (2000)
- (Puerto Rico) Steven Moya (2014)
- (Zaire) Ntema Ndungidi (2000)
- (Canada) Tyler O'Neill (2016)
- (Australia) Trent Oeltjen (2006)
- (Cuba) Bill Ortega (2001)
- (Venezuela) Gerardo Parra (2008)
- (Dominican Republic) Carlos Peguero (2010)
- (Dominican Republic) Francisco Peguero (2010)
- (Dominican Republic) Wily Mo Peña (2001–2002)
- (Dominican Republic) Eury Pérez (2010)
- (Dominican Republic) Félix Pie (2003–2004)
- (Dominican Republic) Gregory Polanco (2013)
- (Canada) Dalton Pompey (2014)
- (Dominican Republic) Wilkin Ramírez (2008; 2010)
- (Puerto Rico) Heliot Ramos (2018)
- (Venezuela) René Reyes (1999)
- (Puerto Rico) Alex Ríos (2003)
- (Venezuela) Juan Rivera (2001)
- (Dominican Republic) Víctor Robles (2017)
- (Venezuela) Yorman Rodríguez (2015)
- (Dominican Republic) Wilkin Ruan (2001)
- (Cuba) Alex Sánchez (1999)
- (Dominican Republic) Jesus Sánchez (2018)
- (Dominican Republic) Domingo Santana (2014)
- (Dominican Republic) Luis Saturria (2000)
- (Canada) Michael Saunders (2007)
- (Dominican Republic) Alfredo Silverio (2011)
- (Cuba) Jorge Soler (2013)
- (Venezuela) José Tábata (2006)
- (Dominican Republic) Raimel Tapia (2015–2016)
- (Dominican Republic) Leody Taveras (2018)
- (Dominican Republic) Oscar Taveras (2012–2013)
- (Dominican Republic) Willy Taveras (2004)
- (Cuba) Jorge Toca (1999)
- (Jamaica) Goef Tomlinson (1999)
- (Puerto Rico) Andrés Torres (2002)
- (Canada) Rene Tosoni (2009)
- (Cuba) Henry Urrutia (2013)
- (Canada) Jimmy Van Ostrand (2007)
- (United States) Alex Verdugo (2017)
- (Canada) Nick Weglarz (2009)

== American League (2019–present) ==
=== Pitchers ===
- Kade Anderson (2026)
- Jamie Arnold (2026)
- Jordan Balazovic (2019)
- Shane Baz (2021)
- Clayton Beeter (2023)
- Brayan Bello (2021–2022)
- A. J. Blubaugh (2024)
- Taj Bradley (2022)
- Tyler Bremner (2026)
- Hunter Brown (2022)
- J. B. Bukauskas (2019)
- Ky Bush (2022)
- Jonathan Cannon (2023)
- Joey Cantillo (2023)
- Kendry Chourio (2026)
- Jurrangelo Cijntje (2025)
- Caden Dana (2024)
- Reid Detmers (2021)
- Marcos Diplán (2021)
- Shane Drohan (2023)
- Justin Dunn (2019)
- Joseph Dzierwa (2026)
- Anthony Eyanson (2026)
- David Festa (2023)
- Wilmer Flores (2022)
- Deivi García (2019)
- Keagan Gillies (2025)
- Ben Grable (2026)
- DL Hall (2019)
- Emerson Hancock (2021, 2022)
- Brody Hopkins (2025)
- Gage Jump (2025)
- George Klassen (2025)
- Will Klein (2023)
- Ben Kudrna (2024)
- Jack Leiter (2022)
- Matt Manning (2019)
- Alec Marsh (2022)
- Brendan McKay (2019)
- Luis Medina (2021)
- Parker Messick (2025)
- Luis Morales (2024)
- Frank Mozzicato (2025)
- Nate Pearson (2019)
- Fernando Pérez (2024)
- Nolan Perry (2026)
- Cole Ragans (2021)
- Sem Robberse (2023)
- Grayson Rodriguez (2019)
- Alimber Santa (2025)
- Winston Santos (2024)
- Caden Scarborough (2026)
- Noah Schultz (2024, 2025)
- Brady Singer (2019)
- Ryan Sloan (2026)
- Emiliano Teodo (2024)
- Ricky Tiedemann (2022)
- Ken Waldichuk (2022)
- Owen White (2023)
- Josh Winder (2021)
- Cole Winn (2021)
- Héctor Yan (2021)
- Trey Yesavage (2025)
- Yosver Zulueta (2022, 2023)

=== Catchers ===
- Samuel Basallo (2024)
- Josue Briceño (2025)
- Yainer Díaz (2022)
- Dillon Dingler (2022)
- Nathan Flewelling (2026)
- Harry Ford (2023–2025)
- Ronaldo Hernández (2019)
- Sam Huff (2019)
- Carter Jensen (2025)
- Shea Langeliers (2022)
- Blake Mitchell (2026)
- Bo Naylor (2021)
- Edgar Quero (2023)
- Jake Rogers (2019)
- Adley Rutschman (2021)
- Tyler Soderstrom (2021, 2023)
- Kyle Teel (2024)

=== Infielders ===
- Max Anderson (2026)
- Franklin Arias (2026)
- Caleb Bonemer (2026)
- Vidal Bruján (2021)
- Jake Burger (2021)
- Junior Caminero (2023)
- Kaelen Culpepper (2025)
- Leo De Vries (2026)
- Jeter Downs (2021)
- Xavier Edwards (2021)
- Wander Franco (2019)
- Dustin Harris (2022)
- Gunnar Henderson (2022)
- Jackson Holliday (2023)
- Xavier Isaac (baseball) (2024)
- Nolan Jones (2019)
- CJ Kayfus (2025)
- Luke Keaschall (2024)
- Colt Keith (2023)
- Hao-Yu Lee (2024)
- Royce Lewis (2019)
- George Lombard Jr. (2025)
- Nick Madrigal (2019)
- Justyn-Henry Malloy (2023)
- Kyle Manzardo (2023)
- Austin Martin (2021)
- Jorge Mateo (2019)
- Brice Matthews (2025)
- Marcelo Mayer (2023, 2024)
- Kevin McGonigle (2025)
- Curtis Mead (2022)
- Colson Montgomery (2024)
- Xavier Neyens (2026)
- Jhonkensy Noel (2022)
- Isaac Paredes (2019)
- JoJo Parker (2026)
- Kyren Paris (2023)
- Nick Pratto (2021–2022)
- Spencer Steer (2022)
- Spencer Torkelson (2021)
- Ralphy Velazquez (2024, 2026)
- Anthony Volpe (2022)
- Sebastian Walcott (2024, 2025)
- Evan White (2019)
- Tommy White (2025)
- Bobby Witt Jr. (2021)
- Nick Yorke (2023)
- Cole Young (2024)

=== Outfielders ===
- Jo Adell (2019)
- Kevin Alvarez (2026)
- Enrique Bradfield (2025)
- Lawrence Butler (2023)
- Yoelqui Céspedes (2021)
- Jaison Chourio (2024)
- Max Clark (2024, 2025)
- Denzel Clarke (2022)
- Jonatan Clase (2023)
- Oscar Colás (2022)
- Gavin Cross (2024)
- Jasson Domínguez (2021–2022)
- Jarren Duran (2019)
- Jhostynxon García (2025)
- Drew Gilbert (2023)
- Theo Gillen (2026)
- Riley Greene (2021)
- Ike Irish (2026)
- Walker Jenkins (2026)
- Daniel Johnson (2019)
- Spencer Jones (2023, 2024)
- Jarred Kelenic (2019, 2021)
- Heston Kjerstad (2023)
- Pedro León (2021)
- Lázaro Montes (2025)
- Braden Montgomery (2025)
- Nelson Rada (2026)
- Ceddanne Rafaela (2022)
- Luis Robert Jr. (2019)
- Julio Rodríguez (2021)
- Chandler Simpson (2024)
- Matt Wallner (2022)
- George Valera (2022)

== National League (2019–present) ==
=== Pitchers ===
- Mick Abel (2023)
- Andrew Abbott (2022)
- Adbert Alzolay (2019)
- Ian Anderson (2019)
- Ben Bowden (2019)
- Mike Burrows (2022)
- Cam Caminiti (2026)
- Cade Cavalli (2021, 2022)
- Bubba Chandler (2024)
- Alex Clemmey (2025)
- Roansy Contreras (2021)
- Liam Doyle (2026)
- Jake Eder (2021)
- José Ferrer (2022)
- MacKenzie Gore (2019)
- Marquis Grissom Jr. (2025)
- Hayden Harris (2025)
- Kyle Harrison (2022, 2023)
- Tink Hence (2023, 2024)
- Seth Hernandez (2026)
- Welinton Herrera (2025)
- Andre Jackson (2021)
- Anthony Kay (2019)
- Antoine Kelly (2022)
- Matthew Liberatore (2021)
- Nick Lodolo (2021)
- Rhett Lowder (2024)
- J. P. Massey (2023)
- Quinn Mathews (2024)
- Dustin May (2019)
- Kash Mayfield (2026)
- Mason McGwire (2026)
- Max Meyer (2021)
- Noble Meyer (2024)
- Karson Milbrandt (2026)
- Bobby Miller (2022)
- Erik Miller (2022)
- Jacob Misiorowski (2023)
- Patrick Monteverde (2023)
- Adrián Morejón (2019)
- Andrew Painter (2025)
- Wen Hui Pan (2026)
- Luis Patiño (2019)
- Eury Pérez (2022)
- Quinn Priester (2021)
- JR Ritchie (2025)
- Manuel Rodríguez (2021)
- Sixto Sánchez (2019)
- Spencer Schwellenbach (2023)
- Jared Shuster (2022)
- Miguel Sime Jr. (2026)
- Ethan Small (2021)
- Robby Snelling (2024)
- Brandon Sproat (2024)
- Travis Sykora (2025)
- Jonah Tong (2025)
- Mike Vasil (2023)
- Carson Whisenhunt (2023, 2025)
- Thomas White (2024, 2025)
- Jaxon Wiggins (2025)
- Devin Williams (2019)
- Gage Wood (2026)

=== Catchers ===
- Francisco Álvarez (2021, 2022)
- Miguel Amaya (2019)
- Drake Baldwin (2024)
- Joey Bart (2019)
- Luis Campusano (2021)
- Diego Cartaya (2022)
- Henry Davis (2022)
- Alfredo Duno (2025, 2026)
- Thayron Liranzo (2024)
- Willie MacIver (2021)
- Joe Mack (2025)
- Logan O'Hoppe (2022)
- Jeferson Quero (2023)
- Rainiel Rodríguez (2026)
- Dalton Rushing (2023)
- Ethan Salas (2024, 2026)
- Eduardo Tait (2025)
- Daulton Varsho (2019)

=== Infielders ===
- CJ Abrams (2021)
- Darren Baker (2022)
- Brett Baty (2021)
- Ryan Bliss (2023)
- Alec Bohm (2019)
- Michael Busch (2021)
- Ryan Clifford (2026)
- Cam Collier (2024)
- Charlie Condon (2025, 2026)
- Will Craig (2019)
- Kayson Cunningham (2026)
- Elly De La Cruz (2022)
- Deyvison De Los Santos (2024)
- Leo De Vries (2025)
- Bryce Eldridge (2024)
- Isan Díaz (2019)
- Nolan Gorman (2019, 2021)
- Konnor Griffin (2025)
- LuJames Groover (2025)
- Brady House (2023)
- Termarr Johnson (2024)
- Carter Kieboom (2019)
- Gavin Kilen (2026)
- Jordan Lawlar (2023)
- Marco Luciano (2021)
- Gavin Lux (2019)
- Jesús Made (2025, 2026)
- Noelvi Marte (2023)
- Jackson Merrill (2023)
- Aidan Miller (2024)
- BJ Murray (2023)
- Nasim Nuñez (2023)
- Luis Peña (2026)
- Jeral Pérez (2024)
- Cooper Pratt (2024)
- Endy Rodríguez (2023)
- Matt Shaw (2024)
- Sal Stewart (2025)
- Bryson Stott (2021)
- Michael Toglia (2021)
- Ezequiel Tovar (2022)
- Miguel Vargas (2022)
- Mark Vientos (2022)
- David Villar (2022)
- JJ Wetherholt (2025)
- Eli Willits (2026)
- Masyn Winn (2022)

=== Outfielders ===
- Carson Benge (2025)
- Roldy Brito (2026)
- Owen Caissie (2025)
- Slade Caldwell (2025)
- Dylan Carlson (2019)
- Corbin Carroll (2022)
- Jackson Chourio (2022, 2023)
- Justin Crawford (2023, 2024)
- Dylan Crews (2024)
- Pete Crow-Armstrong (2022, 2023)
- Brennen Davis (2021)
- Josue De Paula (2025, 2026)
- Yanquiel Fernández (2023)
- Edward Florentino (2026)
- Michael Harris II (2021)
- Monte Harrison (2019)
- Josiah Hartshorn (2026)
- Robert Hassell (2022)
- Zyhir Hope (2025)
- Druw Jones (2024)
- Dakota Jordan (2026)
- Jordan Lawlar (2022)
- Cristian Pache (2019)
- Heliot Ramos (2019, 2021)
- Victor Scott II (2023)
- Mike Sirota (2026)
- Alek Thomas (2019, 2021)
- Taylor Trammell (2019)
- James Triantos (2024)
- Esmerlyn Valdez (2025)
- Zac Veen (2022)
- Ryan Vilade (2021)
- Jordan Walker (2022)
- Drew Waters (2021)
- Joey Wiemer (2022)
- James Wood (2023)

== Sources ==
- "All-Star Futures Game History". MLB.com.
  - "2023 SiriusXM All-Star Futures Game". MLB.com.
  - "2022 SiriusXM All-Star Futures Game". MLB.com.
  - "2021 SiriusXM All-Star Futures Game". MLB.com.
  - "2019 SiriusXM All-Star Futures Game". MLB.com.
  - "2018 SiriusXM All-Star Futures Game". MLB.com.
