= Theodorou =

Theodorou (Greek: Θεοδώρου) is a Greek patronymic surname, the genitive form of the name Theodoros. It can refer to:

- Elias Theodorou (1988–2022), Canadian mixed martial artist
- Nick Theodorou (born 1975), American baseball player
- Nikolas Theodorou (born 2000), Greek chess grandmaster
- Panos Theodorou (born 1994), Cypriot football midfielder
- Paraskevi Theodorou (born 1986), Cypriot hammer thrower
- Zacharias Theodorou (born 1993), Cypriot football midfielder

== See also ==
- Theodoridis
