= Simon Mathews =

Simon Mathews may refer to:

- Simon Mathews (baseball) (born 1995), American baseball coach
- Simon Mathews (settler) (died 1755), Welsh American immigrant and millwright
