= Forest Park, Chalfont =

Former amusement park in Pennsylvania, USA

Forest Park was an amusement park located in Chalfont, Pennsylvania. It operated from 1835 to 1968.

== History of grounds ==
The introduction of the railroad in Chalfont brought new visitors to the area. In 1835, George Eckhardt opened Eckhardt's Grove, a park commonly used for picnics. The land eventually changed ownership, and in 1885, the new Forest Park opened. One of its main attractions was music played by the Chalfont Cornet Band.

== Amusement park ==
In 1930, business partners Koons and Sanders bought the park. In 1933, the Lusse family installed a scooter ride in the park. Later, the Lusses brought radio shows to the park, most notably the Uncle Ezra show in 1933. The park's popularity grew, and in 1934, the Lusses bought the park. A number of amusement rides, including a merry-go-round and swan ride came to the park. A large swimming pool was also constructed in the 1930s. In 1945, a woman was buried alive for ten days at the park, generating much local publicity and bringing guests. In 1948, the Frontiertown section was opened, featuring a miniature railway and several stores. A Native American, "Chief One Star", also served as an attraction. The park reached its height in the post-World War II years of the 1940s. Strings bands played weekly at the park, and many companies held picnics on its grounds. In a notable event, a company's picnic attracted 40,000 of its employees to the park.

== Decline ==
In the late 1950s, the park began to decline. The local school board levied an amusement tax, and limits were made to the trains which brought guests to the park. On Memorial Day of 1958, a race riot took place, causing much damage and injuring 20 people. That day, there were around 20,000 guests at the park, and during the riot many fled into the nearby forest to escape the danger. This event severely damaged both the park and its reputation. In 1968, the park closed.

== Legacy ==
The only attraction of the park which remained in use after 1968 was the swimming pool. In more recent years, neighborhoods with amusement park-inspired names have been built in the area. Many of the picnic groves and several other buildings remained standing for decades past the park's closure. As of 2014, there were still remains of concrete park benches scattered about the former location.
