= Simon Butler =

Simon Butler was an important historical figure in the history of Chalfont, Pennsylvania during the 18th century.

== Life ==
In 1712, Simon Butler, with his good friend Simon Mathews, immigrated from Wales to Pennsylvania. They landed in Philadelphia and lived for a time in New Castle County. In 1720, he purchased 176 acres of land that included much of the then-standing "Village of Chalfont" from a former land grant founded by William Penn. In 1730, he finished construction of his house and mill and then purchased over 400 more acres of land in 1745 including much of present-day Chalfont and New Britain. During this time, Butler built a number of gristmills on the sites of original mills, such as the Funk sawmill and the Shellenberger's mill.

He then acted as the sole justice of the peace in the county, and until his death he was the economic and legal power in the area. Among other important duties he wrote wills and was well known for his extremely sound judgement. He was also a devout Baptist and helped construct one of the first Baptist churches in the area, the New Britain Baptist Church. After his death in August 1764, his land was parceled to many people, most notably George Kungle, who opened a public house in the 1760s.

== Simon Butler Elementary School ==
Butler lives in local memory through the lending of his name to Butler Pike, laid out in 1712 and the local Butler Elementary School. The local elementary school, named for Simon Butler, is located in Chalfont near The Highlands. The land on which the school now stands was part of 450 acres that Simon Butler purchased in 1720, as mentioned above. He operated a mill here which was located nearby on U.S. Route 202 Business, known by locals as Butler Avenue. Butler's sons, Simon and Benjamin also intermarried into the area and their descendants continued to live in the township.
