= 1997 UCLA Bruins baseball team =

American college baseball season

1997 UCLA Bruins baseball

Midwest Regional champions

College World Series, T-7th
- Conference: Pacific-10
- CB: No. 8
- Record: 45–21–1 (19–11 Pac-10)
- Head coach: Gary Adams (23rd season)
- Hitting coach: Vince Beringhele (8th season)
- Pitching coach: Tim Leary (1st season)
- Captain: Jon Heinrich
- Home stadium: Jackie Robinson Stadium

1997 Pacific-10 Conference baseball standings
	Conf.				Overall
Team	W		L	PCT	W		L	PCT
Northern
No. 15 Washington ^{x}‍‍‍^{y}	20	–	4	.833	46	–	20	.697
Oregon State ‍‍‍	18	–	6	.750	38	–	12	.760
Washington State ‍‍‍	7	–	17	.292	13	–	42	.236
Portland State ‍‍‍	3	–	21	.125	10	–	43	.189
Southern
No. 4 Stanford ^{x}‍‍‍^{y}	21	–	9	.700	45	–	20	.692
No. 8 UCLA ‍‍‍^{y}	19	–	11	.633	45	–	21	.682
No. 13 Southern California ‍‍‍^{y}	17	–	13	.567	42	–	20	.677
No. 14 Arizona State ‍‍‍^{y}	16	–	14	.533	39	–	22	.639
Arizona ‍‍‍	13	–	17	.433	32	–	26	.552
California ‍‍‍	4	–	26	.133	21	–	38	.356
x – Division champion y – Invited to the NCAA tournament As of June 30, 1997; Rankings from Collegiate Baseball

The 1997 UCLA Bruins baseball team represented the University of California, Los Angeles in the 1997 NCAA Division I baseball season. The Bruins played their home games at Jackie Robinson Stadium. The team was coached by Gary Adams in his 23rd year at UCLA.

The Bruins won the Midwest Regional to advance to the College World Series, where they were eliminated after losses to the Miami (FL) Hurricanes and Mississippi State Bulldogs.

== Roster ==
1997 UCLA Bruins baseball team
Players
Coaches

#	Pos.	Name	B/T	Height	Weight	Year	Home town
1		Peter Zamora	/	—	—	Jr
2	LHP	Tom Jacquez	L/L	—	—	Fr
3	OF	Eric Valent	L/L	—	—	So
4		Brennan Hymes	/	—	—
5	C	Jason Green	/	—	—
6	OF	Eric Byrnes	R/R	—	—	Jr
7	INF	Jack Santora	/	—	—	So
8		Al Thielmann	/	—	—
9		Chad Matoian	/	—	—	Sr
10	P	Rob Henkel	/	—	—
12	P	Gabe Crecion	/	—	—
14	C	Royce Valent	/	—	—	Sr
15		Matt Walker	/	—	—
16		Rob Schult	/	—	—
17		Derek Fowler	/	—	—
19		Michael Hymes	/	—	—
20	P	Matt Klein	/	—	—
21		Glenn Thompkins	/	—	—
22	INF	Brett Nista	/	—	—	Jr
23	INF	Aldo Pinto	/	—	—	Fr
25	INF	Troy Glaus	R/R	—	—	Jr
26	INF	Nick Theodorou	/	—	—	Jr
27		Michael Caravelli	/	—	—
28	LHP	Jim Parque	L/L	—	—	Jr
29		Sam Brownell	/	—	—
30	C	Mike Jaramillo	/	—	—	Sr
31	P	Sam Madrid	/	—	—
32	OF	Jon Heinrichs (C)	/	—	—	Sr
33	P	Dan Keller	/	—	—
34	P	Tony Righetti	/	—	—
36		Ryan O'Toole	/	—	—
37	P	John Phillips	/	—	—
38	C	Casey Cloud	/	—	—	Jr
39		Nick St. George	/	—	—
40		Brandon Rogers	/	—	—
42		Ryan Reightley	/	—	—
43		Billy Pieper	/	—	—
45		Ryan Roques	/	—	—
49	INF	Cassidy Olson	/	—	—	Jr
51		Jeff Lassiter	/	—	—
53	P	Jake Meyer	/	—	—	Jr

Head coach

13 Gary Adams

Assistant coach(es)

24 Brian Criss

Hitting coach(es)

11 Vince Beringhele

Pitching coach(es)

54 Tim Leary

Legend

- (C) Team captain
- (S) Suspended
- (I) Ineligible
- Injured
- Current redshirt

== Schedule ==
1997 UCLA Bruins baseball game log
Regular season
January (4–0)

#	Date	Opponent	Site/stadium	Score	Overall record	Pac-10 record
1	January 23	at Hawaii	Rainbow Stadium • Honolulu, Hawaii	23–11	1–0	0–0
2	January 24	at Hawaii	Rainbow Stadium • Honolulu, Hawaii	10–0	2–0	0–0
3	January 25	at Hawaii	Rainbow Stadium • Honolulu, Hawaii	12–8	3–0	0–0
4	January 28	at UNLV	Earl Wilson Stadium • Paradise, Nevada	7–4	4–0	0–0

February (14–2–1)

#	Date	Opponent	Site/stadium	Score	Overall record	Pac-10 record
5	February 1	at UNLV	Earl Wilson Stadium • Paradise, Nevada	12–5	5–0	0–0
6	February 2	at UNLV	Earl Wilson Stadium • Paradise, Nevada	10–3	6–0	0–0
7	February 4	Pepperdine	Jackie Robinson Stadium • Los Angeles, California	6–5	7–0	0–0
8	February 5	at Cal State Northridge	Matador Field • Northridge, California	9–9	7–0–1	0–0
9	February 7	Nevada	Jackie Robinson Stadium • Los Angeles, California	11–3	8–0–1	0–0
10	February 8	Nevada	Jackie Robinson Stadium • Los Angeles, California	5–6	8–1–1	0–0
11	February 9	Nevada	Jackie Robinson Stadium • Los Angeles, California	11–0	9–1–1	0–0
12	February 11	at San Diego	John Cunningham Stadium • San Diego, California	7–1	10–1–1	0–0
13	February 14	Loyola Marymount	Jackie Robinson Stadium • Los Angeles, California	13–1	11–1–1	0–0
14	February 15	at Loyola Marymount	George C. Page Stadium • Los Angeles, California	10–5	12–1–1	0–0
15	February 16	Loyola Marymount	Jackie Robinson Stadium • Los Angeles, California	13–4	13–1–1	0–0
16	February 18	at UC Santa Barbara	Caesar Uyesaka Stadium • Santa Barbara, California	17–7	14–1–1	0–0
17	February 21	Arizona State	Jackie Robinson Stadium • Los Angeles, California	4–3	15–1–1	1–0
18	February 22	Arizona State	Jackie Robinson Stadium • Los Angeles, California	16–5	16–1–1	2–0
19	February 23	Arizona State	Jackie Robinson Stadium • Los Angeles, California	12–17	16–2–1	2–1
20	February 25	Cal State Dominguez Hills	Jackie Robinson Stadium • Los Angeles, California	21–10	17–2–1	2–1
21	February 28	vs Washington	Hubert H. Humphrey Metrodome • Minneapolis, Minnesota	11–5	18–2–1	2–1

March (10–4)

#	Date	Opponent	Site/stadium	Score	Overall record	Pac-10 record
22	March 1	vs Nebraska	Hubert H. Humphrey Metrodome • Minneapolis, Minnesota	12–9	19–2–1	2–1
23	March 2	at Minnesota	Hubert H. Humphrey Metrodome • Minneapolis, Minnesota	13–5	20–2–1	2–1
24	March 4	UC Santa Barbara	Jackie Robinson Stadium • Los Angeles, California	6–9	20–3–1	2–1
25	March 7	at Arizona	Jerry Kindall Field at Frank Sancet Stadium • Tucson, Arizona	2–4	20–4–1	2–2
26	March 8	at Arizona	Jerry Kindall Field at Frank Sancet Stadium • Tucson, Arizona	3–13	20–5–1	2–3
27	March 9	at Arizona	Jerry Kindall Field at Frank Sancet Stadium • Tucson, Arizona	12–1	21–5–1	3–3
28	March 11	Cal State Fullerton	Jackie Robinson Stadium • Los Angeles, California	7–6	22–5–1	3–3
29	March 13	Cal State Los Angeles	Jackie Robinson Stadium • Los Angeles, California	16–2	23–5–1	3–3
30	March 22	at USC	Dedeaux Field • Los Angeles, California	12–6	24–5–1	4–3
31	March 23	USC	Jackie Robinson Stadium • Los Angeles, California	8–5	25–5–1	5–3
32	March 24	at USC	Dedeaux Field • Los Angeles, California	7–8	25–6–1	5–4
33	March 27	California	Jackie Robinson Stadium • Los Angeles, California	13–1	26–6–1	6–4
34	March 28	California	Jackie Robinson Stadium • Los Angeles, California	9–0	27–6–1	7–4
35	March 29	California	Jackie Robinson Stadium • Los Angeles, California	8–0	28–6–1	8–4

April (8–8)

#	Date	Opponent	Site/stadium	Score	Overall record	Pac-10 record
36	April 1	at Pepperdine	Eddy D. Field Stadium • Malibu, California	7–8	28–7–1	8–4
37	April 4	at Arizona State	Packard Stadium • Tempe, Arizona	5–2	29–7–1	9–4
38	April 5	at Arizona State	Packard Stadium • Tempe, Arizona	3–4	29–8–1	9–5
39	April 6	at Arizona State	Packard Stadium • Tempe, Arizona	14–15	29–9–1	9–6
40	April 8	Long Beach State	Jackie Robinson Stadium • Los Angeles, California	3–14	29–10–1	9–6
41	April 11	Arizona	Jackie Robinson Stadium • Los Angeles, California	11–3	30–10–1	10–6
42	April 12	Arizona	Jackie Robinson Stadium • Los Angeles, California	13–6	31–10–1	11–6
43	April 13	Arizona	Jackie Robinson Stadium • Los Angeles, California	13–3	32–10–1	12–6
44	April 19	at Stanford	Sunken Diamond • Stanford, California	4–7	32–11–1	12–7
45	April 19	at Stanford	Sunken Diamond • Stanford, California	8–5	33–11–1	13–7
46	April 20	at Stanford	Sunken Diamond • Stanford, California	5–3	34–11–1	14–7
47	April 22	San Diego	Jackie Robinson Stadium • Los Angeles, California	8–3	35–11–1	14–7
48	April 25	USC	Jackie Robinson Stadium • Los Angeles, California	6–10	35–12–1	14–8
49	April 26	at USC	Jackie Robinson Stadium • Los Angeles, California	2–11	35–13–1	14–9
50	April 27	USC	Jackie Robinson Stadium • Los Angeles, California	14–4	36–13–1	15–9
51	April 29	at Cal State Fullerton	Goodwin Field • Fullerton, California	3–11	36–14–1	15–9

May (4–4)

#	Date	Opponent	Site/stadium	Score	Overall record	Pac-10 record
52	May 2	at California	Evans Diamond • Berkeley, California	6–5	37–14–1	16–9
53	May 3	at California	Evans Diamond • Berkeley, California	7–6	38–14–1	17–9
54	May 4	at California	Evans Diamond • Berkeley, California	8–9	38–15–1	17–10
55	May 6	at Long Beach State	Blair Field • Long Beach, California	3–7	38–16–1	17–10
56	May 9	Stanford	Jackie Robinson Stadium • Los Angeles, California	10–9	39–16–1	18–10
57	May 10	Stanford	Jackie Robinson Stadium • Los Angeles, California	13–8	40–16–1	19–10
58	May 11	Stanford	Jackie Robinson Stadium • Los Angeles, California	6–9	40–17–1	19–11
59	May 13	Cal State Northridge	Jackie Robinson Stadium • Los Angeles, California	6–12	40–18–1	19–11

Postseason
Midwest Regional (5–1)

#	Date	Opponent	Site/stadium	Score	Overall record	Pac-10 record
60	May 22	vs Harvard	Allie P. Reynolds Stadium • Stillwater, Oklahoma	2–7	40–19–1	19–11
61	May 23	vs Ohio	Allie P. Reynolds Stadium • Stillwater, Oklahoma	15–14	41–19–1	19–11
62	May 24	vs Tennessee	Allie P. Reynolds Stadium • Stillwater, Oklahoma	5–3	42–19–1	19–11
63	May 24	vs Harvard	Allie P. Reynolds Stadium • Stillwater, Oklahoma	14–9	43–19–1	19–11
64	May 25	at Oklahoma State	Allie P. Reynolds Stadium • Stillwater, Oklahoma	14–2	44–19–1	19–11
65	May 25	at Oklahoma State	Allie P. Reynolds Stadium • Stillwater, Oklahoma	22–2	45–19–1	19–11

College World Series (0–2)

#	Date	Opponent	Site/stadium	Score	Overall record	Pac-8 record
66	May 31	vs Miami (FL)	Johnny Rosenblatt Stadium • Omaha, Nebraska	3–7	45–20–1	19–11
67	June 1	vs Mississippi State	Johnny Rosenblatt Stadium • Omaha, Nebraska	5–7	45–21–1	19–11

== Awards and honors ==
Eric Byrnes

- All-Pac-10

Troy Glaus

- All-Pac-10
- All-Midwest Regional Team
- First Team All-American Baseball America
- First Team All-American The Sports Network
- First Team All-American National Collegiate Baseball Writers Association
- Second Team All-American Collegiate Baseball

Jon Heinrichs

- All-Pac-10
- Second Team All-American Collegiate Baseball
- Second Team All-American American Baseball Coaches Association
- Third Team All-American Baseball America
- Third Team All-American National Collegiate Baseball Writers Association

Tom Jacquez

- All-Pac-10

Jim Parque

- All-Pac-10
- All-Midwest Regional Team
- Third Team All-American Collegiate Baseball
- Second Team All-American The Sports Network
- Second Team All-American American Baseball Coaches Association

Nick Theodorou

- All-Midwest Regional Team

Eric Valent

- All-Pac-10
- All-Midwest Regional Team
- Second Team All-American The Sports Network
- Third Team All-American American Baseball Coaches Association

Peter Zamora

- All-Pac-10
- All-Midwest Regional Team
- Third Team All-American National Collegiate Baseball Writers Association
