= Simon Mathews (settler) =

Welsh immigrant (??–1755)

Simon Mathews (died 1755) was a Welsh immigrant who came to Pennsylvania with his cousin Simon Butler in 1712. Along with Butler, he is considered one of the founding fathers of Chalfont, Pennsylvania.

== Life ==
Mathews was born in Wales, the son of Thomas Mathew, a devout Baptist. In 1712, with his cousin, Simon Butler, he came to the new Pennsylvania Colony. He was a millwright, by trade, and a devout Baptist like his father before him. He moved to and raised a family in New Castle County in Delaware. In 1720, he moved to the New Britain area of Bucks County with Butler, who had already established himself in the area. In 1731, he bought 147 acres of land and built a home. His farmhouse still stands today and is the home of Nostalgia Weddings. He died in 1755 and his estate was bequeathed to his son Thomas. He fathered many children and his descendants are still in the area.

== Legacy ==
Mathews is lesser known than Simon Butler, who acted as both a legal power and large landowner in the area. Besides his descendants, his greatest legacy is his beautiful farmhouse which still stands today as the home of a local business.
