= Sean Coyle (baseball) =

American baseball player (born 1992)

- Second baseman
- Born: January 17, 1992 (age 33); Chalfont, Pennsylvania, U.S.
- Bats: Right Throws: Right

Sean Edward Coyle (born January 17, 1992) is an American former professional baseball second baseman. Listed at 5' 8" (1.70 m), 175 lb. (79 k), Coyle batted and threw right handed. He was born in Chalfont, Pennsylvania.

== High school ==
Coyle hit .562 with 55 runs batted in and a school-record 13 home runs as a senior at Germantown Academy, to claim 2009–2010 Pennsylvania Gatorade Player of the Year honors and a selection to the 2010 Baseball America All-America High School First Team. Previously, he had batted .296 in eight games for USA Baseball's 18-and-under team at the 2009 Pan American Junior Championships (COPABE) held in Barquisimeto, Venezuela.

== Professional career ==
=== Boston Red Sox ===
The Boston Red Sox selected Coyle in the third round of the 2010 MLB draft out of Germantown Academy in Fort Washington, Pennsylvania, signing him for a bonus of $1,300,000. He then played from 2010 through 2013 for the Gulf Coast League Red Sox, Greenville Drive and Salem Red Sox, before joining the Portland Sea Dogs in 2014. He was added to the 40-man roster in November 2014.

Coyle was named the Red Sox's No. 17 prospect by MLB.com entering the 2012 season, after leading Single-A Greenville and sharing the lead among Red Sox minor leaguers with seven triples in 2011. He also topped Greenville in walks (60), while ranking second both in doubles (27) and runs (77) as well as third in RBI (64) and stolen bases (14). In addition, Coyle collected a career-high seven RBI in Greenville's season finale against the Hickory Crawdads on September 5, 2011 and was named a MiLB Organizational All-Star in that season, repeating that honor in 2012.

In 2013, Coyle was a member of the Salem champion team and was named the Carolina League Championship Series MVP after hitting two two-run doubles for a total of seven RBI in the three-game series. Unfortunately, he did not play in the Division Series due to an injury.

Coyle was added to the US roster for the 2014 All-Star Futures Game in late June, 2014. He was named as a replacement for Mookie Betts, who was no longer eligible after his promotion to the Boston Red Sox. The announcement highlighted a resurgence for Coyle, who appeared in only 60 games in an injury-plagued 2013 season. Along with missing time with injuries to his thumb, knee, and elbow, he hit only .241 while repeating the Carolina League.

After a solid start in 2014 with Double-A Portland, Coyle then missed four weeks with a hamstring injury. Nevertheless, he was dominant after his activation in May, and excelled in June. In one particularly impressive stretch, he went 8-for-15 (.533) with five walks, four extra-base hits, and 11 RBI in a four-game series against the Reading Fightin Phils, winning a Player of the Week distinction (June 23–29). The month was capped when he posted a slash line of .348/.450/.652 with an organization-leading six home runs to earn Player of the Month honors, as well as his Futures Games and Eastern League All-Star Game selections on the same day. He hit .295/.371/.512 in 384 plate appearances in 2014, driving in 61 runs and scoring 60 times, while mashing 16 homers and stealing 13 bases. After that, he joined the Surprise Saguaros of the Arizona Fall League in the month of November. Coyle credited much of his success to the influence of former Red Sox catcher Rich Gedman, who served as his hitting instructor at Salem and coached him at Portland.

In 2015 Coyle gained a promotion to the Triple-A Pawtucket Red Sox. He was rated as the Red Sox's No. 17 prospect in 2015, according to MLB.com.

Coyle was designated for assignment by the Red Sox following the acquisition of Michael Martínez on July 8, 2016.

=== Los Angeles Angels of Anaheim ===
On July 18, 2016, Coyle was claimed off waivers by the Los Angeles Angels of Anaheim. He was designated for assignment following the promotion of Nick Buss on August 13. Coyle cleared waivers and was sent outright to the Double–A Arkansas Travelers on August 16. In 40 games for Arkansas, he hit .204/.278/.312 with three home runs and 13 RBI. Coyle elected free agency following the season on November 7.

=== Baltimore Orioles ===
On December 13, 2016, Coyle signed a minor league contract with the Baltimore Orioles. In 42 appearances for the Double-A Bowie Baysox, he batted .187/.273/.306 with one home run, eight RBI, and two stolen bases. Coyle was released by the Orioles organization on June 5, 2017.
