= Chalfont Historic District =

Historic district in Pennsylvania, United States

- U.S. National Register of Historic Places
- U.S. Historic district
- Main Street in Chalfont

- Location within Pennsylvania Location within the United States
- Location: Roughly bounded by Chestnut Street Park Avenue, Main Street, Butler Avenue and Sunset Avenue, Chalfont, Pennsylvania
- Coordinates: 40°17′25″N 75°12′38″W
- Built: 1856
- Architect: Martin, A Oscar,
- Architectural style: Gothic Revival, Classical Revival
- NRHP reference No.: 06001148
- Added to NRHP: December 18, 2006

The Chalfont Historic District is a national historic district located in a portion of the Borough of Chalfont, Bucks County, Pennsylvania. The district encompasses Main Street (Pennsylvania Route 152) and Butler Avenue (U.S. Route 202 Business) with their American colonial and Victorian-style homes. The district includes 121 contributing buildings and 1 contributing site in the borough of Chalfont. Historic buildings include the Simon Butler Mill House, built in 1730, and the Chalfont train station.

It was added to the National Register of Historic Places in 2006.

== See also ==
- List of Registered Historic Places in Bucks County, Pennsylvania
