= J. P. Massey =

American baseball player (born 2000)

- Pitcher
- Born: April 1, 2000 (age 26); Chicago, Illinois, U.S.
- Bats: Right Throws: Right

Jeffery Peathon Massey (born April 1, 2000) is an American professional baseball pitcher.

== Career ==
Attended Gwendolyn Brooks College Preparatory Academy In 2018, he won the RBI World Series. He enrolled at the University of Minnesota and played college baseball for the Minnesota Golden Gophers.

After the 2022 season, the Pittsburgh Pirates selected Massey in the seventh round of the 2022 MLB draft. Massey committed to transfer to the University of Missouri. He signed with the Pirates rather than transfer. He played for the Bradenton Marauders of the Low-A Florida State League (FSL) in 2023 and was named FSL pitcher of the month for May. In June, he was promoted to the Greensboro Grasshoppers of the High-A Carolina League. Massey was selected to represent the Pirates at the 2023 All-Star Futures Game.
