= Wes Hodges =

American baseball player (born 1984)

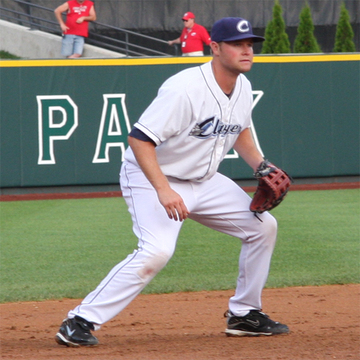
- Wes Hodges as a baseball player in 2009
- First baseman
- Born: September 14, 1984 (age 42); Chattanooga, Tennessee
- Bats: Right Throws: Right
- Stats at Baseball Reference

Career highlights and awards
- Team USA Baseball 2005; Selected as the 69th overall pick in the 2006 MLB Draft by the Cleveland Indians; Highest compensated pick for the Indians in the 2006 MLB Draft; 2008 MLB Futures Game Participant
Medals
Men's baseball
Representing United States

Wesley Michael Hodges (born September 14, 1984) is an American former professional baseball player. He played third base and first base in Minor League Baseball (MiLB) for the Cleveland Indians, Colorado Rockies, and San Francisco Giants organizations. Hodges was selected as the 69th overall pick in the 2006 Major League Baseball draft by the Cleveland Indians. He was the highest compensated pick for the Indians in the 2006 draft, agreeing to terms on $1,000,000 contract. After his playing career, he founded Pure Sports Capital, a wealth management firm focused on professional athletes.

== Early life and education ==
Wes Hodges was born in Chattanooga, Tennessee, to Mike and Tracie Hodges. He began playing baseball in his early childhood, growing up as an Atlanta Braves fan and idolizing outfielder Dale Murphy. As a teenager, he was a standout on the Baylor School baseball team.

=== College ===
Hodges played college baseball at Georgia Tech, and in 2004, he played collegiate summer baseball with the Yarmouth–Dennis Red Sox of the Cape Cod Baseball League. As a junior in 2006, Hodges was a Preseason All-American selection, batted .337 (69-205) with 49 runs scored, 19 doubles, 11 home runs and 64 RBI in 54 games while being named to the Atlantic Coast Conference 2nd Team. Wes later graduated from Georgia Tech with a bachelor's degree in Business Administration with a Finance concentration.

=== National team ===
Hodges was selected to play for the United States national baseball team in the summer of 2005, when he was the MVP of the USA vs Italy series.

== Professional Baseball career ==
=== Draft ===
Hodges was drafted by the Cleveland Indians as the 69th pick of the 2006 MLB Draft. The Cleveland Indians agreed on July 21 to a contract with Hodges, giving him a signing bonus of $1 million. At the time, Hodges was one of only 17 players to sign a seven figure bonus in the second round.

=== 2007 season ===
Hodges played for the Kinston Indians hitting .288, 15 HRs, 71 RBI's in 104 games. He was named to the 2007 Carolina League Post-Season All-Star Team.

=== 2008 season ===
In 2008 Wes earned Rookie of the Year honors in the Eastern League. He finished T1st in the Eastern League and led the Indians organization with 97 RBI (tying the Akron Aeros’ franchise record with Manny Ramirez). His 18HR were 9th in the league and 2nd among Tribe minor leaguers. His .466 slugging % was 11th in the EL and his 146 hits were 5th. He was a mid-season and post-season Eastern League all-star selection.

Wes was selected to play in the 2008 Futures Game at Yankee Stadium and hit a double. He was ranked as the 16th best prospect in the Eastern League by Baseball America. He had an 11-game hitting streak from June 5–17 and reached base in 23 straight games via hit or walk from June 3–27. He went 3 for 4 w/3RS, 2HR & 7RBI on April 15 vs. Binghamton...Best months were May (.347, 21RBI) &June (.314, 21RBI)...For the season he hit .300 (110-367) off RHP with 17HR & 76RBI (.872OPS)...Also hit .296 (77-260) with runners on base. After the season, he was named to the Arizona Fall League's 2008 Top Prospects Team. Wes hit .349 (38-109) with the Surprise Rafters with 8 2B, 6HR & 26 RBI in 25 games (.587SLG, .956OPS)...His 26 RBI ranked tied for seventh in the league while playing in the Arizona Fall League’s Rising Stars Game.

=== 2009 season ===
Wes was limited to 86 games with a sprained right wrist, suffered sliding into 2nd base on May 12 vs. Lehigh Valley. He was on the DL from May 13-July 3 and spent 5 games in A Lake County from June 26-July 2 rehabbing the injury. He was added to the Cleveland Indians 40-man roster on Nov 20.

=== 2010 season ===
Hodges spent the entire 2010 season in the International League (AAA) for the Columbus Clippers. He hit .270, 15 HR's, 60 RBI's. He was a member of the Indians 40 man roster until he was designated for assignment on July 27, 2010.

On August 3, 2010, Hodges was claimed off waivers by the Colorado Rockies. On August 5, 2010, Hodges was re-claimed off waivers by the Cleveland Indians. Hodges was outrighted to Triple-A Columbus on November 3, 2010, removing him from the 40-man roster.

=== 2011 season ===
Hodges was released by the Indians on June 7, 2011, and signed a minor league contract with the San Francisco Giants on June 14, 2011. He elected free agency after the season and later re-signed with the Giants on December 22, 2011.

=== 2012 season ===
Hodges spent most of the 2012 season on the disabled list. He was offered a contract by the Giants for 2013, but chose to retire from baseball in order to focus on his family and earn his degree in Business Administration and Finance from Georgia Tech.

== Post-playing career ==
Hodges retired from baseball in 2012 to finish his degree from the Scheller College of Business at Georgia Tech. In 2015, he was hired as Player Financial Consultant by the San Francisco Giants to counsel the organization's players by conducting seminars during spring training and the offseason.

== Personal life ==
Hodges lives in Charlotte, North Carolina with his wife and daughter.
