= 1997 Stanford Cardinal baseball team =

American college baseball season

1997 Stanford Cardinal baseball

West Regional champions

College World Series, 4th
- Conference: Pacific 10 Conference

Ranking
- Coaches: No. 4
- CB: No. 4
- Record: 45–20 (21–9 Pac-10)
- Head coach: Mark Marquess (21st season)
- Home stadium: Sunken Diamond

1997 Pacific-10 Conference baseball standings
	Conf.				Overall
Team	W		L	PCT	W		L	PCT
Northern
No. 15 Washington ^{x}‍‍‍^{y}	20	–	4	.833	46	–	20	.697
Oregon State ‍‍‍	18	–	6	.750	38	–	12	.760
Washington State ‍‍‍	7	–	17	.292	13	–	42	.236
Portland State ‍‍‍	3	–	21	.125	10	–	43	.189
Southern
No. 4 Stanford ^{x}‍‍‍^{y}	21	–	9	.700	45	–	20	.692
No. 8 UCLA ‍‍‍^{y}	19	–	11	.633	45	–	21	.682
No. 13 Southern California ‍‍‍^{y}	17	–	13	.567	42	–	20	.677
No. 14 Arizona State ‍‍‍^{y}	16	–	14	.533	39	–	22	.639
Arizona ‍‍‍	13	–	17	.433	32	–	26	.552
California ‍‍‍	4	–	26	.133	21	–	38	.356
x – Division champion y – Invited to the NCAA tournament As of June 30, 1997; Rankings from Collegiate Baseball

The 1997 Stanford Cardinal baseball team represented Stanford University in the 1997 NCAA Division I baseball season. The Cardinal played their home games at Sunken Diamond. The team was coached by Mark Marquess in his 21st year at Stanford.

The Cardinal won the West Regional to advanced to the College World Series, where they were defeated by the LSU Tigers.

== Roster ==
1997 Stanford Cardinal baseball team
Players
Coaches

#	Pos.	Name	B/T	Height	Weight	Year	Home town
		Damien Alvarado	/	—	—	Fr
	RHP	Jeff Austin	R/R	6 ft 0 in (1.83 m)	185 lb (84 kg)	So	Kingwood, Texas
		John Barneson	/	—	—
	INF	Eric Bruntlett	R/R	6 ft 0 in (1.83 m)	200 lb (91 kg)	Fr	West Lafayette, Indiana
		Stephen Chan	/	—	—
	OF	Chris Clark	R/R	5 ft 10 in (1.78 m)	180 lb (82 kg)	Jr	St. Petersburg, Florida
	LHP	Tony Cogan	L/L	6 ft 2 in (1.88 m)	205 lb (93 kg)	So	Highland Park, Illinois
		Chris Collins	/	—	—
		Nick Day	/	—	—	Fr
	RHP	Justin Dunning	R/R	6 ft 3 in (1.91 m)	210 lb (95 kg)	So	Dallas, Texas
	P	Brian Fearnow	/	—	—
	INF	John Gall	R/R	6 ft 0 in (1.83 m)	195 lb (88 kg)	Fr	Mountain View, California
	OF	Jody Gerut	L/L	6 ft 0 in (1.83 m)	190 lb (86 kg)	So	Villa Park, Illinois
	P	Adam Harris	/	—	—
	LHP	Brent Hoard	R/L	6 ft 4 in (1.93 m)	215 lb (98 kg)	Fr	San Jose, California
	INF	Josh Hochgesang	R/R	6 ft 3 in (1.91 m)	210 lb (95 kg)	So	Fullerton, California
	RHP	Chad Hutchinson	R/R	6 ft 5 in (1.96 m)	230 lb (104 kg)	So	San Diego, California
	INF	Joe Kilburg	L/R	5 ft 11 in (1.8 m)	180 lb (82 kg)	Jr	Cleveland, Ohio
	LHP	Josh Koons	L/L	6 ft 3 in (1.91 m)	215 lb (98 kg)	So	West Lafayette, Indiana
	P	Geoff Linville	/	—	—
	OF	Edmund Muth	L/L	6 ft 0 in (1.83 m)	190 lb (86 kg)	Fr	Long Beach, California
	P	Cameron Newton	/	—	—
		Cabe Nicksic	/	—	—
	INF	Jay Pecci	S/R	5 ft 11 in (1.8 m)	192 lb (87 kg)	Jr	Redwood City, California
	RHP	Kyle Peterson	L/R	6 ft 3 in (1.91 m)	215 lb (98 kg)	Jr	Omaha, Nebraska
	INF	Luke Quaccia	L/R	6 ft 6 in (1.98 m)	220 lb (100 kg)		Modesto, California
	INF	Jeff Rizzo	L/R	6 ft 0 in (1.83 m)	190 lb (86 kg)	Fr	La Jolla, California
		John Salter	/	—	—	So
		Joe Savig	/	—	—
	C	Jon Schaeffer	R/R	6 ft 1 in (1.85 m)	205 lb (93 kg)	Jr	Tarzana, California
	INF	Tony Schrager	R/R	6 ft 1 in (1.85 m)	170 lb (77 kg)	So	Omaha, Nebraska
	OF	Craig Thompson	S/R	6 ft 0 in (1.83 m)	190 lb (86 kg)	Fr	Dallas, Texas

Head coach

Mark Marquess

Assistant coach(es)

Legend

- (C) Team captain
- (S) Suspended
- (I) Ineligible
- Injured
- Current redshirt

Roster
Last update: January 17, 2021

== Schedule ==
1997 Stanford Cardinal baseball game log
Regular season
January (2–1)

#	Date	Opponent	Site/stadium	Score	Overall record	Pac-10 record
1	January 26	Saint Mary's	Sunken Diamond • Stanford, California	18–6	1–0	–
2	January 27	Saint Mary's	Sunken Diamond • Stanford, California	10–1	2–0	–
3	January 31	at Cal State Fullerton	Titan Field • Fullerton, California	5–6	2–1	–

February (11–5)

#	Date	Opponent	Site/stadium	Score	Overall record	Pac-10 record
4	February 1	at Cal State Fullerton	Titan Field • Fullerton, California	15–5	3–1	–
5	February 2	at Cal State Fullerton	Titan Field • Fullerton, California	5–9	3–2	–
6	February 4	Cal State Los Angeles	Sunken Diamond • Stanford, California	7–5	4–2	–
7	February 7	Fresno State	Sunken Diamond • Stanford, California	6–1	5–2	–
8	February 8	Fresno State	Sunken Diamond • Stanford, California	0–1	5–3	–
9	February 9	Fresno State	Sunken Diamond • Stanford, California	14–2	6–3	–
10	February 11	Nevada	Sunken Diamond • Stanford, California	15–3	7–3	–
11	February 15	Santa Clara	Sunken Diamond • Stanford, California	9–8	8–3	–
12	February 16	at Santa Clara	Stephen Schott Stadium • Santa Clara, California	5–6	8–4	–
13	February 17	Santa Clara	Sunken Diamond • Stanford, California	8–6	9–4	–
14	February 18	at UC Davis	Dobbins Stadium • Davis, California	12–4	10–4	–
15	February 21	UC Santa Barbara	Sunken Diamond • Stanford, California	4–6	10–5	–
16	February 22	UC Santa Barbara	Sunken Diamond • Stanford, California	8–10	10–6	–
17	February 23	UC Santa Barbara	Sunken Diamond • Stanford, California	12–7	11–6	–
18	February 25	at Sacramento State	John Smith Field • Sacramento, California	18–4	12–6	–
19	February 28	Southern California	Sunken Diamond • Stanford, California	4–0	13–6	1–0

March (10–2)

#	Date	Opponent	Site/stadium	Score	Overall record	Pac-10 record
20	March 1	Southern California	Sunken Diamond • Stanford, California	5–4	14–6	2–0
21	March 2	Southern California	Sunken Diamond • Stanford, California	22–13	15–6	3–0
22	March 4	San Francisco	Dante Benedetti Diamond at Max Ulrich Field • San Francisco, California	8–7	16–6	3–0
23	March 7	at Arizona State	Packard Stadium • Tempe, Arizona	11–9	17–6	4–0
24	March 8	at Arizona State	Packard Stadium • Tempe, Arizona	10–4	18–6	5–0
25	March 9	at Arizona State	Packard Stadium • Tempe, Arizona	8–12	18–7	5–1
26	March 22	California	Sunken Diamond • Stanford, California	6–5	19–7	6–1
27	March 23	at California	Evans Diamond • Berkeley, California	20–5	20–7	7–1
28	March 24	California	Sunken Diamond • Stanford, California	16–4	21–7	8–1
29	March 27	at Arizona	Jerry Kindall Field at Frank Sancet Stadium • Tucson, Arizona	10–3	22–7	9–1
30	March 28	at Arizona	Jerry Kindall Field at Frank Sancet Stadium • Tucson, Arizona	7–11	22–8	9–2
31	March 29	at Arizona	Jerry Kindall Field at Frank Sancet Stadium • Tucson, Arizona	4–2	23–8	10–2

April (11–5)

#	Date	Opponent	Site/stadium	Score	Overall record	Pac-10 record
32	April 4	at Southern California	Dedeaux Field • Los Angeles, California	15–9	24–8	11–2
33	April 5	at Southern California	Dedeaux Field • Los Angeles, California	4–2	25–8	12–2
34	April 6	at Southern California	Dedeaux Field • Los Angeles, California	10–3	26–8	13–2
35	April 8	at Santa Clara	Stephen Schott Stadium • Santa Clara, California	15–4	27–8	13–2
36	April 11	Arizona State	Sunken Diamond • Stanford, California	3–4	27–9	13–3
37	April 12	Arizona State	Sunken Diamond • Stanford, California	5–16	27–10	13–4
38	April 13	Arizona State	Sunken Diamond • Stanford, California	3–5	27–11	13–5
39	April 15	San Jose State	Sunken Diamond • Stanford, California	12–6	28–11	13–5
40	April 19	UCLA	Sunken Diamond • Stanford, California	7–4	29–11	14–5
41	April 19	UCLA	Sunken Diamond • Stanford, California	5–8	29–12	14–6
42	April 20	UCLA	Sunken Diamond • Stanford, California	3–5	29–13	14–7
43	April 22	Sacramento State	Sunken Diamond • Stanford, California	9–3	30–13	14–7
44	April 25	at California	Evans Diamond • Berkeley, California	14–2	31–13	15–7
45	April 26	California	Sunken Diamond • Stanford, California	8–0	32–13	16–7
46	April 27	at California	Evans Diamond • Berkeley, California	12–6	33–13	17–7
47	April 29	Cal Poly	Sunken Diamond • Stanford, California	4–3	34–13	17–7

May (4–3)

#	Date	Opponent	Site/stadium	Score	Overall record	Pac-10 record
48	May 2	Arizona	Sunken Diamond • Stanford, California	9–2	35–13	18–7
49	May 3	Arizona	Sunken Diamond • Stanford, California	13–9	36–13	19–7
50	May 4	Arizona	Sunken Diamond • Stanford, California	12–1	37–13	20–7
51	May 6	at San Jose State	San Jose Municipal Stadium • San Jose, California	5–14	37–14	20–7
52	May 9	at UCLA	Jackie Robinson Stadium • Los Angeles, California	9–10	37–15	20–8
53	May 10	at UCLA	Jackie Robinson Stadium • Los Angeles, California	8–13	37–16	20–9
54	May 11	at UCLA	Jackie Robinson Stadium • Los Angeles, California	9–6	38–16	21–9

Postseason
Pac-10 Championship Series (1–2)

#	Date	Opponent	Site/stadium	Score	Overall record	Pac-10 record
55	May 15	vs Washington	Sunken Diamond • Stanford, California	7–6	39–16	21–9
56	May 16	Washington	Sunken Diamond • Stanford, California	8–13	39–16	21–9
57	May 17	Washington	Sunken Diamond • Stanford, California	9–12	39–17	21–9

NCAA West Regional (4–0)

#	Date	Opponent	Site/stadium	Score	Overall record	Pac-10 record
58	May 22	Northeastern	Sunken Diamond • Stanford, California	12–3	40–17	21–9
59	May 23	Texas A&M	Sunken Diamond • Stanford, California	3–1	41–17	21–9
60	May 24	Santa Clara	Sunken Diamond • Stanford, California	9–2	42–17	21–9
61	May 25	Texas Tech	Sunken Diamond • Stanford, California	5–2	43–17	21–9

College World Series (2–2)

#	Date	Opponent	Site/stadium	Score	Overall record	Pac-10 record
62	May 30	vs Auburn	Johnny Rosenblatt Stadium • Omaha, Nebraska	8–3	44–17	21–9
63	June 1	vs LSU	Johnny Rosenblatt Stadium • Omaha, Nebraska	5–10	44–18	21–9
64	June 3	vs Auburn	Johnny Rosenblatt Stadium • Omaha, Nebraska	11–4	45–18	21–9
65	June 4	vs LSU	Johnny Rosenblatt Stadium • Omaha, Nebraska	9–13	45–19	21–9

== Awards and honors ==
Jeff Austin

- College World Series All-Tournament Team

John Gall

- Second Team Freshman All-American Baseball America

Jody Gerut

- All-Pac-10 South Division

Kyle Peterson

- Pac-10 Conference Southern Division Pitcher of the Year
- First Team All-American Baseball America

Edmund Muth

- All-Pac-10 South Division
- First Team Freshman All-American Baseball America

Jon Schaeffer

- All-Pac-10 South Division
