= 1997 Miami Hurricanes baseball team =

American college baseball season

1997 Miami Hurricanes baseball

NCAA Atlantic Regional champions

College World Series, 2–2
- Conference: Independent
- Record: 51–18
- Head coach: Jim Morris (4th year)
- Home stadium: Mark Light Field

1997 NCAA Division I baseball independents standings
	Conf.				Overall
Team	W		L	PCT	W		L	PCT
No. 3 Miami (FL) ‍‍‍^{y}		–		–	51	–	18	.739
Cal State Northridge ‍‍‍		–		–	42	–	20	.677
Oral Roberts ‍‍‍		–		–	26	–	30	.464
Hawaii–Hilo ‍‍‍		–		–	13	–	34	.277
Wofford ‍‍‍		–		–	13	–	34	.277
Southern Utah ‍‍‍		–		–	8	–	37	.178
y – Invited to the NCAA tournament As of June 30, 1997; Rankings from Collegiate Baseball

The 1997 Miami Hurricanes baseball team represented the University of Miami in the 1997 NCAA Division I baseball season. The Hurricanes played their home games at Mark Light Field. The team was coached by Jim Morris in his fourth season at Miami.

The Hurricanes reached the College World Series, where they finished tied for third after recording an opening round win against UCLA and a second round win over top-seeded and eventual runner-up Alabama and a pair of semifinal losses to Alabama.

== Personnel ==
=== Roster ===
1997 Miami Hurricanes roster
Pitchers: - J. D. Arteaga - Senior; - Robbie Morrison - Sophomore; - Todd Ozias - Junior; - Eddy Reyes - Junior; - Alex Santos - Freshman; - Darin Spassoff - Sophomore; Catchers: - Russ Jacobson - Freshman; - Mike Lopez-Cao - Senior; - Joe Curro - Freshman	Infielders: - Brad Brewer - Junior; - Pat Burrell - Sophomore; - Oscar Cartaya - Sophomore; - Lale Esquivel - Freshman; - Bobby Hill - Freshman; - Aubrey Huff - Sophomore; - Rick Saggese - Sophomore; Outfielders: - German Alvarez - Junior; - Ryan Grimmett - Senior; - Mandy Jacomino - Senior; - Jason Michaels - Junior; - Mark Walker - Freshman	Unknown: - David Gil; - Laz Gutierrez; - Greg Howell; - Andrew Lopez-Cao; - Bob Petretta

=== Coaches ===
1997 Miami Hurricanes baseball coaching staff
- Jim Morris – Head coach – 4th year

== Schedule and results ==
Legend
Miami win
Miami loss

1997 Miami Hurricanes baseball game log
Regular season

January
Date	Opponent	Site/stadium	Score	Overall record
Jan 16	at Hawaii	Rainbow Stadium • Honolulu, HI	L 2–3	0–1
Jan 17	at Hawaii	Rainbow Stadium • Honolulu, HI	W 14–7	1–1
Jan 18	at Hawaii	Rainbow Stadium • Honolulu, HI	W 10–7	2–1
Jan 19	at Hawaii	Rainbow Stadium • Honolulu, HI	W 13–11	3–1
Jan 31	South Alabama	Mark Light Field • Coral Gables, FL	W 4–2	4–1

February
Date	Opponent	Site/stadium	Score	Overall record
Feb 1	South Alabama	Mark Light Field • Coral Gables, FL	L 7–9	4–2
Feb 2	South Alabama	Mark Light Field • Coral Gables, FL	W 16–4	5–2
Feb 7	Stetson	Mark Light Field • Coral Gables, FL	L 6–10	5–3
Feb 8	Stetson	Mark Light Field • Coral Gables, FL	W 7–0	6–3
Feb 9	Stetson	Mark Light Field • Coral Gables, FL	W 11–4	7–3
Feb 15	at Florida	Alfred A. McKethan Stadium • Gainesville, FL	L 1–2	7–4
Feb 16	at Florida	Alfred A. McKethan Stadium • Gainesville, FL	L 5–12	7–5
Feb 17	at Stetson	Conrad Park • DeLand, FL	L 10–11	7–6
Feb 21	Florida	Mark Light Field • Coral Gables, FL	W 8–7	8–6
Feb 22	Florida	Mark Light Field • Coral Gables, FL	W 4–1	9–6
Feb 25	Barry	Mark Light Field • Coral Gables, FL	W 8–3	10–6
Feb 28	at Texas	Disch–Falk Field • Austin, TX	L 3–4	10–7

March
Date	Opponent	Site/stadium	Score	Overall record
Mar 1	at Texas	Disch–Falk Field • Austin, TX	L 3–22	10–8
Mar 2	at Texas	Disch–Falk Field • Austin, TX	L 12–13	10–9
Mar 6	FIU	Mark Light Field • Coral Gables, FL	W 5–0	11–9
Mar 7	FIU	Mark Light Field • Coral Gables, FL	L 3–4	11–10
Mar 8	FIU	Mark Light Field • Coral Gables, FL	W 3–4	12–10
Mar 9	FIU	Mark Light Field • Coral Gables, FL	W 9–0	13–10
Mar 12	Illinois State	Mark Light Field • Coral Gables, FL	W 17–3	14–10
Mar 14	Illinois	Mark Light Field • Coral Gables, FL	W 5–2	15–10
Mar 15	Illinois	Mark Light Field • Coral Gables, FL	W 12–1	16–10
Mar 16	Illinois	Mark Light Field • Coral Gables, FL	W 3–2	17–10
Mar 19	Liberty	Mark Light Field • Coral Gables, FL	W 6–0	18–10
Mar 21	C.W. Post	Mark Light Field • Coral Gables, FL	W 7–2	19–10
Mar 22	Toledo	Mark Light Field • Coral Gables, FL	W 22–3	20–10
Mar 24	at South Florida	Red McEwen Field • Tampa, FL	W 13–2	21–10
Mar 25	at South Florida	Red McEwen Field • Tampa, FL	L 2–11	21–11
Mar 27	Harvard	Mark Light Field • Coral Gables, FL	W 10–2	22–11
Mar 28	Harvard	Mark Light Field • Coral Gables, FL	W 22–4	23–11
Mar 29	Harvard	Mark Light Field • Coral Gables, FL	L 6–9	23–12
Mar 30	at Florida Marlins	Homestead Sports Complex • Homestead, FL	L 1–2	

April
Date	Opponent	Site/stadium	Score	Overall record
Apr 4	Georgia Tech	Mark Light Field • Coral Gables, FL	W 10–1	24–12
Apr 5	Georgia Tech	Mark Light Field • Coral Gables, FL	W 9–4	25–12
Apr 6	Georgia Tech	Mark Light Field • Coral Gables, FL	W 12–0	26–12
Apr 9	St. Thomas University	Mark Light Field • Coral Gables, FL	W 12–2	27–12
Apr 11	at Florida State	Dick Howser Stadium • Tallahassee, FL	W 9–5	28–12
Apr 12	at Florida State	Dick Howser Stadium • Tallahassee, FL	W 8–5	29–12
Apr 13	at Florida State	Dick Howser Stadium • Tallahassee, FL	L 7–8	29–13
Apr 18	Duke	Mark Light Field • Coral Gables, FL	W 6–2	30–13
Apr 19	Duke	Mark Light Field • Coral Gables, FL	W 9–5	31–13
Apr 20	Duke	Mark Light Field • Coral Gables, FL	W 17–1	32–13
Apr 23	Florida Atlantic	Mark Light Field • Coral Gables, FL	W 13–8	33–13
Apr 25	Coastal Carolina	Mark Light Field • Coral Gables, FL	W 10–2	34–13
Apr 27	Coastal Carolina	Mark Light Field • Coral Gables, FL	W 10–2	35–13
Apr 27	Coastal Carolina	Mark Light Field • Coral Gables, FL	W 7–3	36–13
Apr 30	Florida Atlantic	Mark Light Field • Coral Gables, FL	W 13–8	37–13

May
Date	Opponent	Site/stadium	Score	Overall record
May 2	Florida State	Mark Light Field • Coral Gables, FL	W 9–1	38–13
May 3	Florida State	Mark Light Field • Coral Gables, FL	W 7–6	39–13
May 4	Florida State	Mark Light Field • Coral Gables, FL	L 3–7	39–14
May 9	Jacksonville	Mark Light Field • Coral Gables, FL	W 12–1	40–14
May 10	Jacksonville	Mark Light Field • Coral Gables, FL	L 14–23	40–15
May 11	Jacksonville	Mark Light Field • Coral Gables, FL	W 10–1	41–15
May 15	Oral Roberts	Mark Light Field • Coral Gables, FL	W 20–3	42–15
May 16	Oral Roberts	Mark Light Field • Coral Gables, FL	W 7–3	43–15
May 17	Oral Roberts	Mark Light Field • Coral Gables, FL	W 7–3	44–15

Postseason

NCAA Atlantic Regional
Date	Opponent	Seed	Site/stadium	Score	Overall record	NCAAT record
May 22	(6) Richmond	(1)	Mark Light Field • Coral Gables, FL	W 11–4	45–15	1–0
May 23	(4) FIU	(1)	Mark Light Field • Coral Gables, FL	W 5–2	46–15	2–0
May 24	(3) Arizona State	(1)	Mark Light Field • Coral Gables, FL	L 3–10	46–16	2–1
May 24	(2) Florida	(1)	Mark Light Field • Coral Gables, FL	W 6–5^{11}	47–16	3–1
May 25	(3) Arizona State	(1)	Mark Light Field • Coral Gables, FL	W 7–6	48–16	4–1
May 25	(3) Arizona State	(1)	Mark Light Field • Coral Gables, FL	W 6–5	49–16	5–1

College World Series
Date	Opponent	Seed	Site/stadium	Score	Overall record	CWS record
May 31	(4) UCLA	(5)	Johnny Rosenblatt Stadium • Omaha, NE	W 7–3	50–16	1–0
June 2	(1) Alabama	(5)	Johnny Rosenblatt Stadium • Omaha, NE	W 6–1	51–16	2–0
June 5	(1) Alabama	(5)	Johnny Rosenblatt Stadium • Omaha, NE	L 6–8	51–17	2–1
June 6	(1) Alabama	(5)	Johnny Rosenblatt Stadium • Omaha, NE	L 2–8	51–18	2–2
