= Theodoridis =

Theodoridis (Greek: Θεοδωρίδης) is a Greek surname. It is a patronymic surname which literally means "the son of Theodoros (Theodore)". Notable people with surname Theodoridis:

- Anastasis Theodoridis, Greek journalist
- Chrysanthos Theodoridis (1933–2005), Pontic Greek singer
- Georgios Theodoridis (sprinter) (born 1972), Greek sprinter
- Giorgos Theodoridis (born 1980), Greek footballer
- Ioannis Theodoridis, Lufthansa Systems FMS Customer Support specialist
- Natassa Theodoridou (born 1970), Greek singer
- Savvas Theodoridis (1935–2020), Greek footballer
- Sergios Theodoridis, Greek scientist
- Stefanos Theodoridis (born 1950), Greek footballer
- Thallis Theodoridis (disambiguation), multiple people
- Theodoros Theodoridis, Greek fashion model
- Vasileios Theodoridis, Greek journalist
- Yannis Theodoridis, Greek scientist
