= Giuseppe Chiaramonte =

American baseball player (born 1976)

- Catcher
- Born: February 19, 1976 (age 50); Santa Cruz, California, U.S.
- Bats: Right Throws: Right
- Stats at Baseball Reference

Giuseppe Carlo Chiaramonte (born February 19, 1976) is an American former professional baseball catcher.

Chiaramonte attended Soquel High School in Soquel, California and Fresno State University, where he played for the Fresno State Bulldogs baseball team in the Western Athletic Conference (WAC) in National Collegiate Athletic Association's (NCAA) Division I. At Fresno State, Chiaramonte was named a First Team NCAA Division I All-American, named Fresno State male Athlete of the Year, and WAC All-Star catcher in 1997. In 1996, he played collegiate summer baseball with the Cotuit Kettleers of the Cape Cod Baseball League and was named a league all-star.

Chiaramonte was drafted by the San Francisco Giants in the fifth round (148th overall) of the 1997 Major League Baseball draft. He participated in the 1999 All-Star Futures Game at Fenway Park and during his tenure with the Giants played for the following minor league teams: San Jose Giants (A), Shreveport Captains/Swamp Dragons (AA), and the Fresno Grizzlies (AAA). Chiaramonte retired at age 26.
