= Nick Theodorou =

American baseball player (born 1975)

- Outfielder / Infielder
- Born: June 7, 1975 (age 50); Rialto, California, U.S.
- Bats: Both Throws: Right
Medals
Men's baseball
Representing Greece
European Baseball Championship
Silver medal – second place	2003 Netherlands	National team

Nicholas Anthony Theodorou (born June 7, 1975) is a former professional baseball outfielder and infielder. Theodorou played in the Los Angeles Dodgers minor league system from 1998 to 2005. He participated in the 2004 Olympics, as a member of Greece's baseball team.

== Biography ==
Theodorou was born in Rialto, California, United States and played college baseball at the University of California, Los Angeles. He was drafted by the Los Angeles Dodgers in the 27th round of the 1998 Major League Baseball draft.

In 2011, Theodorou played for the Greece's baseball team at the 2011 Baseball World Cup in Panama.
