= Chalfont, Pennsylvania =

Borough in Pennsylvania, US

Chalfont
- Home-rule borough
- Main Street in Chalfont

- Flag Seal

- Location of Chalfont in Bucks County, Pennsylvania

- Location of Chalfont in Pennsylvania Chalfont (the United States)
- Coordinates: 40°17′23″N 75°12′37″W
- Country: United States
- State: Pennsylvania
- County: Bucks
- Purchased: 1683

Government
  - Mayor: Sarbani Hazra

Area
  - Total: 1.64 sq mi (4.24 km^{2})
  - Land: 1.62 sq mi (4.19 km^{2})
  - Water: 0.019 sq mi (0.05 km^{2})
- Elevation: 272 ft (83 m)

Population (2020)
  - Total: 4,253
  - Density: 2,627.9/sq mi (1,014.63/km^{2})
- Time zone: UTC-5 (Eastern (EST))
  - Summer (DST): UTC-4 (EDT)
- ZIP Code: 18914
- Area codes: 215, 267 and 445
- FIPS code: 42-12504
- Website: chalfontborough.com

Chalfont is a borough with home rule status in Bucks County, Pennsylvania, United States. The population was 4,253 at the 2020 census. The borough is served by SEPTA Regional Rail's Lansdale/Doylestown Line at Chalfont station.

Chalfont is named after Chalfont St Giles in Buckinghamshire, England. Chalfont was the home of William Penn's first wife, and William Penn is buried at Jordans Quaker Meeting House near Chalfont St Giles.

== History ==
In 1720, Simon Butler bought over 150 acres of land, including the "Village of Chalfont." After the construction of his home and mill, Butler bought more than 400 more acres of land. Butler was a giant historical figure who acted as a legal and economic powerhouse in the area. After his death, the land was parceled to a number of people. Between then and 1901 Chalfont held several names, including Butler's Mill, Kungle's Tavern, Barndtsville, and Whitehallville. For many years, the most important building in the area was the tavern and public house, which has burnt down many times and now stands as Leonardo's Pizza. During the Victorian era in 1855, a train station was built along the newly constructed Doylestown Branch of the North Penn Railroad which helped the community grow and brought about the construction of the many Victorian-style houses.

In 1885, Chalfont established Forest Park. Forest Park began as a small picnic grounds with frequent live music. The construction of the train station assured the park's success. In time, the grounds grew to become a small amusement park where locals could enjoy rides, a large swimming pool built in the 1930s, music (including string bands in the 1940s), and a host for many company picnics. The park closed its doors forever in 1968.

George Eckhart later owned the Butler's mill. After it burned in 1835, Eckhart rebuilt with a larger mill. Later, Eckhart's son Martin inherited the mill and his other son inherited the farm. Part of the farmland included woods of mostly oak locally known as Eckhart's Grove which was frequently used for dance parties, family gatherings, religious camp meetings and Sunday School picnics. Later, in 1885, the mill was owned by Philip B. Grove who leased it to Valentine B. Clymer and Matthew S. Cogan when it burned again and was never rebuilt. Another gristmill was built in 1793 not far from where Bulter's mill was first operated by men named Miller and Evans, later by Francis D. Hartzel. Two of Hartzel's sons succeeded him. After a fire in 1878, the mill was rebuilt and much of the machinery replaced. About 1761, Henry Lewis built a stone tavern operated by George Kungle during the Revolutionary period. Chalfont was known as Kungles Tavern. After Kungle, the tavern was later owned consecutively by James Morris, Lewis Morris, Abner Morris, then John Barndt from Tylersport. The village was then known as Barndtsville.

William Stevens had a store on the south bank of the West Branch Neshaminy Creek and opened a post office in 1845. Chalfont was then known as Whitehallville. In 1869, the North Penn changed the name of the station to Chalfont. Sometime before 1885, the farm inherited by Charles Eckhart was purchased by Isaac Funk. On 27 June 1885, Funk opened the Forest Park on the grounds of the Eckhart's Grove. Guest speakers were attorneys from Doylestown J. Freeman Hendricks and John D. James. Music was provided by the Chalfont Cornet Band. On 20 June 1778, detachments of George Washington's army passed through the West Branch Neshaminy Creek and the North Branch Neshaminy Creek as they travelled from their camp at Valley Forge to Monmouth.

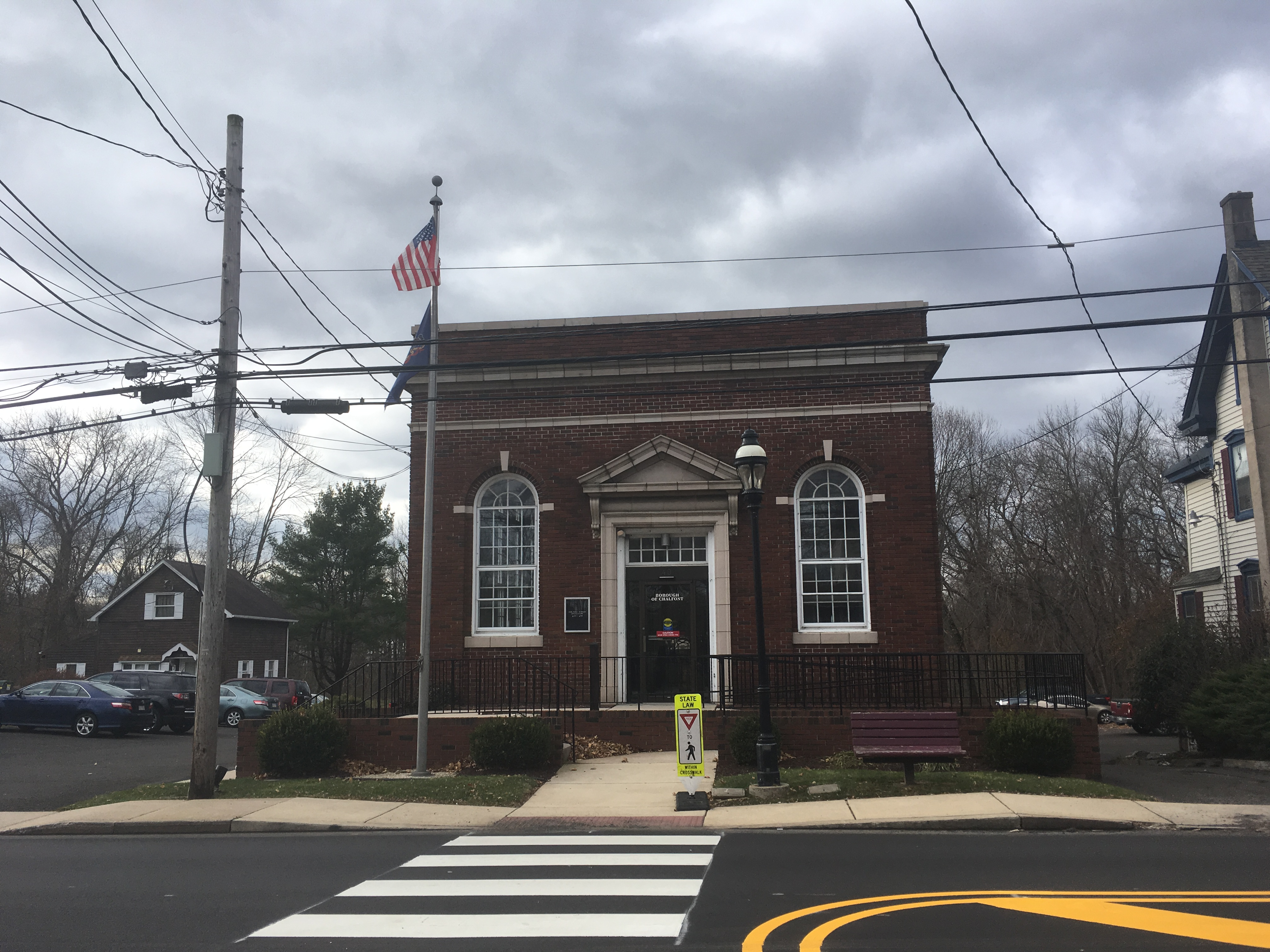
Chalfont Borough Hall

== Geography ==
Neshaminy Creek and Pine Run pass through Chalfont. According to the U.S. Census Bureau, the borough has a total area of 1.6 square miles (4.1 km^{2}), all land.

Chalfont is located within the Philadelphia metropolitan area.

=== Climate ===
According to the Köppen climate classification system, Chalfont has a Hot-summer Humid continental climate (Dfa). Dfa climates are characterized by at least one month having an average mean temperature ≤ 32.0 °F (0.0 °C), at least four months with an average mean temperature ≥ 50.0 °F (10.0 °C), at least one month with an average mean temperature ≥ 71.6 °F (22.0 °C) and no significant precipitation difference between seasons. Although most summer days are slightly humid in Chalfont, episodes of heat and high humidity can occur with heat index values > 106 °F (41 °C). Since 1981, the highest air temperature was 102.7 °F (39.3 °C) on July 22, 2011, and the highest daily average mean dew point was 74.8 °F (23.8 °C) on August 3, 2016. The average wettest month is July, which corresponds with the annual peak in thunderstorm activity. Since 1981, the wettest calendar day was 6.81 inches (173 mm) on September 16, 1999. During the winter months, the average annual extreme minimum air temperature is −0.6 °F (−18.1 °C). Since 1981, the coldest air temperature was −11.9 °F (−24.4 °C) on January 22, 1984. Episodes of extreme cold and wind can occur, with wind chill values < −11 °F (−24 °C). The average annual snowfall (November–April) is between 30 and 36 inches (76 and 91 cm). Ice storms and large snowstorms depositing ≥ 12 inches (30 cm) of snow occur once every few years, particularly during nor'easters from December through February.

Climate data for Chalfont. Elevation: 279 feet (85 m). 1981-2010 Averages (1981-2018 Records).
Month	Jan	Feb	Mar	Apr	May	Jun	Jul	Aug	Sep	Oct	Nov	Dec	Year
Record high °F (°C)	71.0 (21.7)	78.0 (25.6)	87.0 (30.6)	93.7 (34.3)	94.8 (34.9)	95.7 (35.4)	102.7 (39.3)	99.9 (37.7)	97.6 (36.4)	89.2 (31.8)	80.8 (27.1)	75.4 (24.1)	102.7 (39.3)
Mean daily maximum °F (°C)	39.1 (3.9)	42.3 (5.7)	50.7 (10.4)	62.7 (17.1)	72.7 (22.6)	81.5 (27.5)	85.6 (29.8)	84.0 (28.9)	77.0 (25.0)	65.6 (18.7)	54.6 (12.6)	43.2 (6.2)	63.3 (17.4)
Daily mean °F (°C)	30.3 (−0.9)	33.2 (0.7)	40.8 (4.9)	51.5 (10.8)	61.2 (16.2)	70.4 (21.3)	74.9 (23.8)	73.4 (23.0)	66.0 (18.9)	54.3 (12.4)	44.6 (7.0)	34.7 (1.5)	53.0 (11.7)
Mean daily minimum °F (°C)	21.6 (−5.8)	24.0 (−4.4)	30.8 (−0.7)	40.3 (4.6)	49.7 (9.8)	59.4 (15.2)	64.3 (17.9)	62.8 (17.1)	54.9 (12.7)	42.9 (6.1)	34.6 (1.4)	26.2 (−3.2)	42.7 (5.9)
Record low °F (°C)	−11.9 (−24.4)	−4.3 (−20.2)	2.6 (−16.3)	16.5 (−8.6)	32.8 (0.4)	40.8 (4.9)	47.4 (8.6)	42.0 (5.6)	34.6 (1.4)	23.4 (−4.8)	10.9 (−11.7)	−2.8 (−19.3)	−11.9 (−24.4)
Average precipitation inches (mm)	3.29 (84)	2.67 (68)	3.77 (96)	3.95 (100)	4.32 (110)	4.26 (108)	4.94 (125)	4.07 (103)	4.46 (113)	4.14 (105)	3.63 (92)	3.94 (100)	47.44 (1,205)
Average relative humidity (%)	66.8	63.4	59.1	58.2	62.5	67.4	67.7	69.9	71.4	70.2	69.1	69.1	66.3
Average dew point °F (°C)	20.6 (−6.3)	22.1 (−5.5)	27.6 (−2.4)	37.3 (2.9)	48.3 (9.1)	59.1 (15.1)	63.5 (17.5)	63.0 (17.2)	56.5 (13.6)	44.8 (7.1)	35.1 (1.7)	25.6 (−3.6)	42.1 (5.6)
Source: PRISM

== Demographics ==
Historical population
Census	Pop.	Note	%±
1880	216		—
1910	303		—
1920	317		4.6%
1930	550		73.5%
1940	670		21.8%
1950	828		23.6%
1960	1,410		70.3%
1970	2,366		67.8%
1980	2,802		18.4%
1990	3,069		9.5%
2000	3,900		27.1%
2010	4,009		2.8%
2020	4,253		6.1%

=== 2020 census ===
As of the 2020 census, Chalfont had a population of 4,253. The median age was 42.1 years. 21.7% of residents were under the age of 18 and 14.9% of residents were 65 years of age or older. For every 100 females there were 96.6 males, and for every 100 females age 18 and over there were 94.5 males age 18 and over.

100.0% of residents lived in urban areas, while 0.0% lived in rural areas.

There were 1,630 households in Chalfont, of which 33.2% had children under the age of 18 living in them. Of all households, 60.3% were married-couple households, 13.8% were households with a male householder and no spouse or partner present, and 20.4% were households with a female householder and no spouse or partner present. About 22.5% of all households were made up of individuals and 9.1% had someone living alone who was 65 years of age or older.

There were 1,674 housing units, of which 2.6% were vacant. The homeowner vacancy rate was 0.7% and the rental vacancy rate was 3.8%.

Racial composition as of the 2020 census
Race	Number	Percent
White	3,664	86.2%
Black or African American	56	1.3%
American Indian and Alaska Native	8	0.2%
Asian	305	7.2%
Native Hawaiian and Other Pacific Islander	1	0.0%
Some other race	54	1.3%
Two or more races	165	3.9%
Hispanic or Latino (of any race)	164	3.9%

=== 2010 census ===
As of the 2010 census, the borough was 92.7% Non-Hispanic White, 1.4% Black or African American, 0.3% Native American, 3.0% Asian, and 0.8% were two or more races. 1.7% of the population were of Hispanic or Latino ancestry.

=== 2000 census ===
As of the census of 2000, there were 3,977 people, 1,382 households, and 1,039 families residing in the borough. The population density was 2,365.8 people per square mile (913.4 people/km^{2}). There were 1,404 housing units at an average density of 851.7 per square mile (328.8/km^{2}). The racial makeup of the borough was 95.56% White, 1.15% African American, 0.08% Native American, 1.49% Asian, 0.05% from other races, and 0.77% from two or more races. Hispanic or Latino of any race were 1.25% of the population.

There were 1,382 households, out of which 40.1% had children under the age of 18 living with them, 66.2% were married couples living together, 6.9% had a female householder with no husband present, and 24.8% were non-families. 19.6% of all households were made up of individuals, and 4.8% had someone living alone who was 65 years of age or older. The average household size was 2.78 and the average family size was 3.25.

In the borough the population was spread out, with 29.1% under the age of 18, 5.5% from 18 to 24, 34.9% from 25 to 44, 21.9% from 45 to 64, and 8.6% who were 65 years of age or older. The median age was 36 years. For every 100 females, there were 96.9 males. For every 100 females age 18 and over, there were 94.4 males.

The median income for a household in the borough was $63,491, and the median income for a family was $70,592. Males had a median income of $51,139 versus $30,842 for females. The per capita income for the borough was $26,248. About 1.1% of families and 4.1% of the population were below the poverty line, including 1.4% of those under age 18 and 3.2% of those age 65 or over.

== Arts and culture ==
The Chalfont Historic District is listed on the National Register of Historic Places and contains many American colonial and Victorian-style houses. Several of these are former residences which are currently occupied by businesses and are concentrated near the intersection of Butler Avenue (U.S. Route 202 Business) and North Main Street (Pennsylvania Route 152) and extend along North Main Street.

== Infrastructure ==
=== Transportation ===
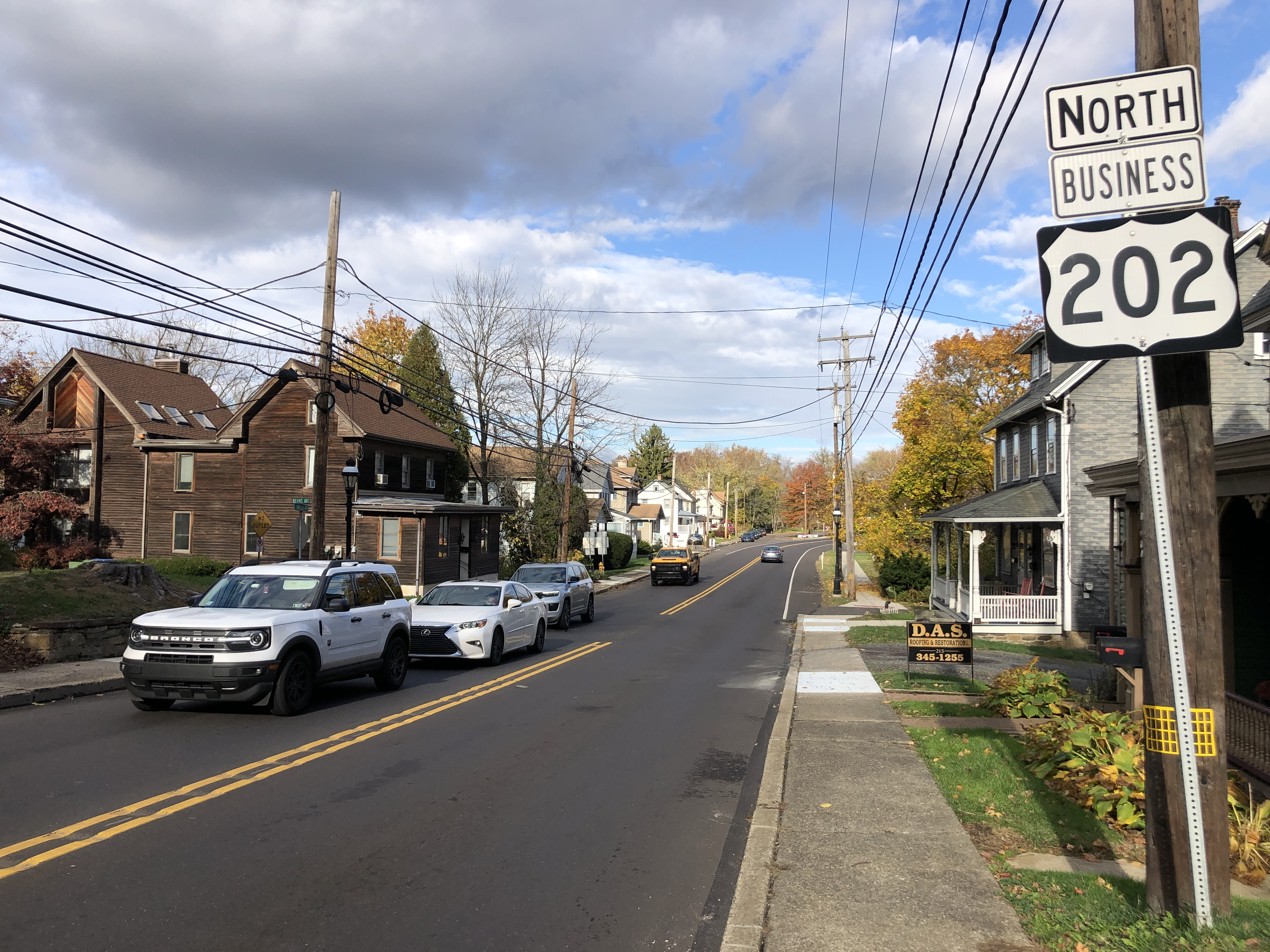
US 202 Business northbound in Chalfont

As of 2016 there were 19.70 miles (31.70 km) of public roads in Chalfont, of which 4.35 miles (7.00 km) were maintained by the Pennsylvania Department of Transportation (PennDOT) and 15.35 miles (24.70 km) were maintained by the borough.

U.S. Route 202 Business and Pennsylvania Route 152 are the numbered highways traversing Chalfont. US 202 Business follows the old alignment of US 202 along Butler Avenue. PA 152 follows a southeast-northwest alignment via Limekiln Pike, Butler Avenue and Main Street, running concurrently with US 202 Business for a short stretch.

Chalfont is served by the Chalfont station on SEPTA Regional Rail's Lansdale/Doylestown Line, which provides service to Doylestown and Center City Philadelphia. Bucks County Transport operates the DART West bus, which runs weekdays from Chalfont to a connection with the Doylestown DART bus to Doylestown at Delaware Valley University.

== Education ==
Chalfont Borough is in the Central Bucks School District. Unami Middle School is in the borough limits. Butler Elementary School has a Chalfont post office address but is within the Brittany Farms-The Highlands CDP in New Britain Township. Both Butler Elementary and Unami Middle School feed into Central Bucks South High School.

Chalfont Borough is divided between the attendance boundaries of Butler Elementary School and Pine Run Elementary School, Unami Middle School and Tohickon Middle School, and Central Bucks South High and Central Bucks West High School.

== Notable people ==
- Bobby Shantz, 1952 American League Most Valuable Player, operated a bowling alley and diner with baseball players Joe Astroth and Shantz's brother Billy.
