= 1997 NCAA Division I baseball season =

Baseball season

- Number of teams: 273

NCAA tournament

College World Series
- Champions: LSU (4th title)
- Runners-up: Alabama (10th CWS Appearance)
- Winning coach: Skip Bertman (4th title)
- MOP: Brandon Larson (LSU)

Seasons
- ← 1996 1998 →

The 1997 NCAA Division I baseball season, play of college baseball in the United States organized by the National Collegiate Athletic Association (NCAA), began in the spring of 1997. It concluded with the 1997 College World Series, the 51st, a double-elimination tournament of eight regional champions held in Omaha, Nebraska, at Johnny Rosenblatt Stadium. LSU claimed its second consecutive and fourth total Division I championship.

== Realignment ==
- The Big Eight Conference merged with four members of the Southwest Conference (Baylor, Texas, Texas A&M, and Texas Tech) to form the Big 12 Conference.

=== Format changes ===
- The Big West Conference divided into two divisions of four, called Northern and Southern.

== Conference winners ==
This is a list of conference champions from the 1997 season. The NCAA sponsored regional competitions to determine the College World Series participants. Each of the eight regionals consisted of six teams competing in double-elimination tournaments, with the winners advancing to Omaha. In order to provide all conference champions with an automatic bid, 10 conference champions participated in a play-in round. The five winners joined the other 19 conference champions with automatic bids, and 32 other teams earned at-large selections.

Conference	Regular season winner	Conference Tournament	Tournament Venue • City	Tournament Winner
America East Conference	Delaware	1997 America East Conference baseball tournament	Frawley Stadium • Wilmington, DE	Northeastern
Atlantic 10 Conference	East - UMass; West - Xavier	1997 Atlantic 10 Conference baseball tournament	Bear Stadium • Boyertown, PA	Virginia Tech
Atlantic Coast Conference	Georgia Tech	1997 Atlantic Coast Conference baseball tournament	Florida Power Park • St. Petersburg, FL	Florida State
Big 12 Conference	Texas Tech	1997 Big 12 Conference baseball tournament	All Sports Stadium • Oklahoma City, OK	Oklahoma
Big East Conference	American - West Virginia; National - Notre Dame	1997 Big East Conference baseball tournament	Senator Thomas J. Dodd Memorial Stadium • Norwich, CT	St. John's
Big South Conference	UNC Greensboro	1997 Big South Conference baseball tournament	Knights Stadium • Fort Mill, SC	UNC Greensboro
Big Ten Conference	Michigan	1997 Big Ten Conference baseball tournament	Ray Fisher Stadium • Ann Arbor, MI	Ohio State
Big West Conference	Northern - Nevada; Southern - Long Beach State	1997 Big West Conference baseball tournament	Blair Field • Long Beach, CA	Cal State Fullerton
Colonial Athletic Association	VCU	1997 Colonial Athletic Association baseball tournament	Grainger Stadium • Kinston, NC	Richmond
Conference USA	Tulane	1997 Conference USA baseball tournament	Turchin Stadium • New Orleans, LA	Houston
Ivy League	Gehrig - Princeton; Rolfe - Harvard	1997 Ivy League Baseball Championship Series	Joseph J. O'Donnell Field • Cambridge, MA	Harvard
Metro Atlantic Athletic Conference	Northern - Niagara; Southern - Fairfield	1997 Metro Atlantic Athletic Conference baseball tournament	Heritage Park • Colonie, NY	Siena
Mid-American Conference	Ohio	1997 Mid-American Conference baseball tournament	Trautwein Field • Athens, OH	Ohio
Midwestern Collegiate Conference	Wright State	1997 Midwestern Collegiate Conference baseball tournament	Wright Stadium • Dayton, OH	Detroit
Mid-Continent Conference	Eastern - Troy State; Western - Northeastern Illinois	1997 Mid-Continent Conference baseball tournament	Les Miller Field • Chicago, IL	Troy State
Mid-Eastern Athletic Conference	North - Howard; South - Florida A&M	1997 Mid-Eastern Athletic Conference baseball tournament	Moore–Kittles Field • Tallahassee, FL	Bethune-Cookman
Missouri Valley Conference	Wichita State	1997 Missouri Valley Conference baseball tournament	Eck Stadium • Wichita, KS	Southwest Missouri State
Northeast Conference	Marist/Fairleigh Dickinson	1997 Northeast Conference baseball tournament	Sussex, NJ	Marist
Ohio Valley Conference	Middle Tennessee/Tennessee Tech	1997 Ohio Valley Conference baseball tournament	Reese Smith Jr. Field • Murfreesboro, TN	Tennessee Tech
Pacific-10 Conference	North - Washington; South - Stanford	1997 Pacific-10 Conference Baseball Championship Series	Sunken Diamond • Stanford, CA	Washington
Patriot League	Army	1997 Patriot League baseball tournament	Johnson Stadium at Doubleday Field • West Point, NY	Army
Southeastern Conference	Eastern - Florida; Western - LSU	1997 Southeastern Conference baseball tournament	Golden Park • Columbus, GA	Alabama
Southern Conference	Western Carolina; Georgia Southern	1997 Southern Conference baseball tournament	Joseph P. Riley Jr. Park • Charleston, SC	Western Carolina
Southland Conference	Louisiana - Northwestern State; Texas - Southwest Texas State	1997 Southland Conference baseball tournament	Warhawk Field • Monroe, LA	Southwest Texas State
Southwestern Athletic Conference	East - Alcorn State; West - Southern	1997 Southwestern Athletic Conference baseball tournament	Kirsch-Rooney Stadium • New Orleans, LA	Southern
Sun Belt Conference	Southwestern Louisiana	1997 Sun Belt Conference baseball tournament	M.L. "Tigue" Moore Field • Lafayette, LA	South Alabama
Trans America Athletic Conference	Eastern - Mercer; Southern - Stetson; Western - Jacksonville State	1997 Trans America Athletic Conference baseball tournament	Conrad Park • DeLand, FL	UCF
West Coast Conference	Santa Clara	No tournament		
Western Athletic Conference	North - Utah; South - Rice; West - San Jose State	1997 Western Athletic Conference baseball tournament	Smith Field • San Diego, CA	Rice

== Conference standings ==
The following is an incomplete list of conference standings:

1997 America East Conference baseball standings
	Conf.				Overall
Team	W		L	PCT	W		L	PCT
Delaware ‍†‍‍	19	–	3	.864	45	–	10	.818
Maine ‍‍‍	16	–	8	.667	24	–	27	.471
Vermont ‍‍‍	15	–	9	.625	27	–	19	.587
Drexel ‍‍‍	13	–	10	.565	28	–	22	.560
Northeastern ‍‍‡‍^{y}	12	–	12	.500	33	–	19	.635
Towson State ‍‍‍	9	–	14	.391	24	–	28	.462
Hartford ‍‍‍	7	–	16	.304	16	–	23	.410
Hofstra ‍‍‍	7	–	16	.304	14	–	28	.333
New Hampshire ‍‍‍	7	–	17	.292	17	–	22	.436
† – Conference champion ‡ – Tournament champion y – Invited to the NCAA tournament As of June 30, 1997; Rankings from Collegiate Baseball

1997 Atlantic Coast Conference baseball standings
	Conf.				Overall
Team	W		L	PCT	W		L	PCT
No. 10 Georgia Tech ‍†‍‍^{y}	19	–	4	.826	46	–	15	.754
No. 9 Florida State ‍‍‡‍^{y}	18	–	6	.750	50	–	17	.746
No. 23 NC State ‍‍‍^{y}	15	–	8	.652	43	–	20	.683
Clemson ‍‍‍^{y}	13	–	10	.565	41	–	23	.641
Wake Forest ‍‍‍	10	–	13	.435	37	–	20	.649
Virginia ‍‍‍	10	–	13	.435	32	–	22	.593
Duke ‍‍‍	9	–	14	.391	33	–	25	.569
North Carolina ‍‍‍	6	–	18	.250	29	–	31	.483
Maryland ‍‍‍	5	–	19	.208	22	–	32	.407
† – Conference champion ‡ – Tournament champion y – Invited to the NCAA tournament As of June 30, 1997; Rankings from Collegiate Baseball

1997 Big 12 Conference baseball standings
	Conf.				Overall
Team	W		L	PCT	W		L	PCT
Texas Tech ‍†‍‍^{y}	23	–	7	.767	46	–	14	.767
No. 12 Oklahoma State ‍‍‍^{y}	21	–	9	.700	46	–	19	.708
No. 26 Texas A&M ‍‍‍^{y}	19	–	11	.633	39	–	22	.639
No. 17 Oklahoma ‍‍‡‍^{y}	18	–	11	.621	39	–	20	.661
Baylor ‍‍‍	18	–	12	.600	32	–	23	.582
Missouri ‍‍‍	15	–	16	.484	31	–	27	.534
Texas ‍‍‍	12	–	15	.444	29	–	22	.569
Kansas ‍‍‍	12	–	18	.400	31	–	25	.554
Kansas State ‍‍‍	10	–	20	.333	32	–	24	.571
Nebraska ‍‍‍	7	–	23	.233	27	–	35	.435
Iowa State ‍‍‍	6	–	21	.222	12	–	31	.279
† – Conference champion ‡ – Tournament champion y – Invited to the NCAA tournament As of June 30, 1997; Rankings from Collegiate Baseball

1997 Big East Conference baseball standings
	Conf.						Overall
Team	W		L		T	PCT	W		L		T	PCT
American Division
West Virginia ^{x}‍‍‍	17	–	7	–	0	.708	36	–	19	–	0	.655
St. John's ‍‍‡‍^{y}	16	–	7	–	0	.696	35	–	17	–	0	.673
Connecticut ‍‍‍	11	–	13	–	0	.458	27	–	20	–	0	.574
Providence ‍‍‍	10	–	15	–	0	.400	26	–	23	–	1	.530
Boston College ‍‍‍	8	–	17	–	0	.320	20	–	23	–	0	.465
Pittsburgh ‍‍‍	8	–	17	–	0	.320	19	–	26	–	0	.422
National Division
Notre Dame ^{x}‍‍‍	15	–	6	–	0	.714	41	–	19	–	0	.683
Rutgers ‍‍‍	13	–	11	–	0	.542	28	–	24	–	0	.538
Seton Hall ‍‍‍	13	–	11	–	0	.542	32	–	22	–	0	.593
Villanova ‍‍‍	12	–	12	–	0	.500	29	–	27	–	0	.518
Georgetown ‍‍‍	8	–	15	–	0	.348	19	–	37	–	1	.342
x – Division champion † – Conference champion ‡ – Tournament champion y – Invited to the NCAA tournament As of June 30, 1997; Rankings from Collegiate Baseball

1997 Big South Conference baseball standings
	Conf.						Overall
Team	W		L		T	PCT	W		L		T	PCT
No. 28 UNC Greensboro ‍†‍‡‍^{y}	18	–	3	–	0	.857	45	–	17	–	0	.726
Winthrop ‍‍‍	14	–	7	–	0	.667	27	–	29	–	1	.482
Charleston Southern ‍‍‍	12	–	8	–	0	.600	21	–	36	–	0	.368
Liberty ‍‍‍	11	–	10	–	0	.524	25	–	32	–	0	.439
UNC Asheville ‍‍‍	9	–	11	–	0	.450	20	–	33	–	0	.377
Radford ‍‍‍	9	–	12	–	0	.429	26	–	28	–	0	.481
UMBC ‍‍‍	5	–	16	–	0	.238	12	–	35	–	0	.255
Coastal Carolina ‍‍‍	5	–	16	–	0	.238	23	–	31	–	0	.426
† – Conference champion ‡ – Tournament champion y – Invited to the NCAA tournament As of June 30, 1997; Rankings from Collegiate Baseball

1997 Big Ten Conference baseball standings
	Conf.				Overall
Team	W		L	PCT	W		L	PCT
Michigan ‍†‍‍	17	–	9	.654	36	–	22	.621
No. 30 Ohio State ‍‍‡‍^{y}	18	–	10	.643	42	–	18	.700
Purdue ‍‍‍	17	–	11	.607	30	–	25	.545
Illinois ‍‍‍	17	–	11	.607	32	–	27	.542
Minnesota ‍‍‍	15	–	10	.600	30	–	24	.556
Penn State ‍‍‍	12	–	14	.462	29	–	24	.547
Michigan State ‍‍‍	12	–	16	.429	26	–	28	.481
Indiana ‍‍‍	8	–	16	.333	33	–	22	.600
Northwestern ‍‍‍	9	–	19	.321	20	–	35	.364
Iowa ‍‍‍	7	–	16	.304	17	–	30	.362
x – Division champion ‡ – Tournament champion y – Invited to the NCAA tournament As of June 30, 1997; Rankings from Collegiate Baseball

1997 Big West Conference baseball standings
	Conf.				Overall
Team	W		L	PCT	W		L	PCT
Northern
Nevada ^{x}‍‍‍	20	–	10	.667	39	–	21	.650
Pacific ‍‍‍	11	–	19	.367	29	–	29	.500
Sacramento State ‍‍‍	8	–	22	.267	16	–	39	.291
New Mexico State ‍‍‍	8	–	22	.267	21	–	33	.389
Southern
No. 24 Long Beach State ^{x}‍‍‍	22	–	8	.733	39	–	26	.600
No. 21 Cal State Fullerton ‍‍‍	21	–	9	.700	39	–	24	.619
Cal Poly ‍‍‍	15	–	15	.500	37	–	21	.638
UC Santa Barbara ‍‍‍	15	–	15	.500	26	–	30	.464
x – Division champion ‡ – Tournament champion y – Invited to the 1997 NCAA Division I baseball tournament As of June 30, 1997; Rankings from Collegiate Baseball

1997 Colonial Athletic Association baseball standings
	Conf.				Overall
Team	W		L	PCT	W		L	PCT
VCU ‍†‍‍	15	–	4	.789	32	–	23	.582
Old Dominion ‍‍‍	12	–	8	.600	34	–	20	.630
James Madison ‍‍‍	10	–	10	.500	31	–	26	.544
George Mason ‍‍‍	10	–	11	.476	29	–	24	.547
East Carolina ‍‍‍	10	–	11	.476	29	–	27	.518
William & Mary ‍‍‍	8	–	12	.400	30	–	24	.556
Richmond ‍‍‡‍^{y}	8	–	12	.400	34	–	26	.567
UNC Wilmington ‍‍‍	7	–	12	.368	28	–	29	.491
† – Conference champion ‡ – Tournament champion y – Invited to the NCAA tournament As of June 30, 1997; Rankings from Collegiate Baseball

1997 Conference USA baseball standings
	Conf.				Overall
Team	W		L	PCT	W		L	PCT
Tulane ‍†‍‍	19	–	7	.731	40	–	21	.656
Houston ‍‍‡‍^{y}	19	–	8	.704	40	–	23	.635
South Florida ‍‍‍^{y}	18	–	8	.692	39	–	24	.619
Southern Miss ‍‍‍	16	–	10	.615	34	–	23	.596
Charlotte ‍‍‍	14	–	12	.538	30	–	26	.536
UAB ‍‍‍	14	–	13	.519	31	–	29	.517
Louisville ‍‍‍	11	–	15	.423	23	–	32	.418
Memphis ‍‍‍	9	–	17	.346	20	–	31	.392
Saint Louis ‍‍‍	8	–	19	.296	21	–	30	.412
Cincinnati ‍‍‍	4	–	23	.148	12	–	46	.207
† – Conference champion ‡ – Tournament champion y – Invited to the NCAA tournament As of June 30, 1997; Rankings from Collegiate Baseball

1997 NCAA Division I baseball independents standings
	Conf.				Overall
Team	W		L	PCT	W		L	PCT
No. 3 Miami (FL) ‍‍‍^{y}		–		–	51	–	18	.739
Cal State Northridge ‍‍‍		–		–	42	–	20	.677
Oral Roberts ‍‍‍		–		–	26	–	30	.464
Hawaii–Hilo ‍‍‍		–		–	13	–	34	.277
Wofford ‍‍‍		–		–	13	–	34	.277
Southern Utah ‍‍‍		–		–	8	–	37	.178
y – Invited to the NCAA tournament As of June 30, 1997; Rankings from Collegiate Baseball

1997 Ivy League baseball standings
	Conf.						Overall
Team	W		L		T	PCT	W		L		T	PCT
Lou Gehrig
Princeton ^{x}‍‍‡‍^{y}	10	–	10	–	0	.500	20	–	25	–	0	.444
Penn ^{x}‍‍‍	10	–	10	–	0	.500	19	–	21	–	0	.475
Cornell ‍‍‍	7	–	13	–	0	.350	13	–	26	–	0	.333
Columbia ‍‍‍	6	–	14	–	0	.300	12	–	25	–	1	.329
Red Rolfe
Harvard ^{x}‍‍‍	18	–	2	–	0	.900	34	–	16	–	0	.680
Yale ‍‍‍	16	–	4	–	0	.800	24	–	19	–	0	.558
Dartmouth ‍‍‍	11	–	9	–	0	.550	22	–	16	–	0	.579
Brown ‍‍‍	2	–	18	–	0	.100	5	–	37	–	0	.119
x – Division champion ‡ – Championship Series champion y – Invited to the NCAA tournament As of June 30, 1997; Rankings from Collegiate Baseball

1997 Metro Atlantic Athletic Conference baseball standings
	Conf.				Overall
Team	W		L	PCT	W		L	PCT
Northern
Niagara ^{x}‍‍‍	11	–	7	.611	17	–	21	.447
Siena ‍‍‡‍^{y}	10	–	8	.556	21	–	34	.382
Le Moyne ‍‍‍	10	–	8	.556	16	–	23	.410
Canisius ‍‍‍	5	–	13	.278	18	–	19	.486
Southern
Fairfield ^{x}‍‍‍	13	–	5	.722	20	–	25	.444
Iona ‍‍‍	10	–	8	.556	19	–	27	.413
Saint Peter's ‍‍‍	7	–	11	.389	10	–	27	.270
Manhattan ‍‍‍	6	–	12	.333	11	–	28	.282
x – Division champion ‡ – Tournament champion y – Invited to the NCAA tournament As of June 30, 1997; Rankings from Collegiate Baseball

1997 Mid-American Conference baseball standings
	Conf.				Overall
Team	W		L	PCT	W		L	PCT
Ohio ‍†‍‡‍^{y}	22	–	9	.710	43	–	18	.705
Ball State ‍‍‍	21	–	10	.677	40	–	19	.678
Kent State ‍‍‍	18	–	13	.581	29	–	28	.509
Miami ‍‍‍	17	–	13	.567	27	–	28	.491
Eastern Michigan ‍‍‍	17	–	14	.548	29	–	25	.537
Central Michigan ‍‍‍	14	–	14	.500	29	–	20	.592
Akron ‍‍‍	31	–	23	.574	14	–	16	.467
Bowling Green ‍‍‍	13	–	17	.433	24	–	27	.471
Toledo ‍‍‍	9	–	20	.310	18	–	33	.353
Western Michigan ‍‍‍	6	–	24	.200	14	–	39	.264
† – Conference champion ‡ – Tournament champion y – Invited to the NCAA tournament As of June 30, 1997; Rankings from Collegiate Baseball

1997 Mid-Continent Conference baseball standings
	Conf.				Overall
Team	W		L	PCT	W		L	PCT
East
Troy State ^{x}‍‍‡‍^{y}	8	–	6	.571	36	–	24	.600
C.W. Post ‍‍‍	8	–	7	.533	21	–	24	.467
NYIT ‍‍‍	9	–	8	.529	21	–	25	.457
Pace ‍‍‍	6	–	6	.500	19	–	18	.514
Central Connecticut ‍‍‍	7	–	8	.467	20	–	16	.556
Youngstown State ‍‍‍	8	–	11	.421	29	–	21	.580
West
Northeastern Illinois ^{x}‍‍‍	16	–	7	.696	29	–	29	.500
Western Illinois ‍‍‍	10	–	9	.526	13	–	24	.351
Chicago State ‍‍‍	10	–	12	.455	14	–	35	.286
Valparaiso ‍‍‍	6	–	24	.200	20	–	31	.392
‡ – Tournament champion y – Invited to the NCAA tournament As of June 30, 1997; Rankings from Collegiate Baseball

1997 Northeast Conference baseball standings
	Conf.						Overall
Team	W		L		T	PCT	W		L		T	PCT
Marist ‍†‍‡‍^{y}	14	–	7	–	0	.667	32	–	19	–	0	.627
Fairleigh Dickinson ‍†‍‍	14	–	7	–	0	.667	23	–	24	–	1	.490
Wagner ‍‍‍	12	–	9	–	0	.571	17	–	29	–	2	.375
Rider ‍‍‍	12	–	9	–	0	.571	20	–	29	–	0	.408
Monmouth ‍‍‍	11	–	10	–	0	.524	23	–	25	–	0	.479
Long Island ‍‍‍	10	–	11	–	0	.476	17	–	21	–	0	.447
St. Francis ‍‍‍	6	–	15	–	0	.286	15	–	24	–	0	.385
Mount St. Mary's ‍‍‍	5	–	16	–	0	.238	10	–	23	–	1	.309
† – Conference champion ‡ – Tournament champion y – Invited to the NCAA tournament Rankings from Collegiate Baseball

1997 Pacific-10 Conference baseball standings
	Conf.				Overall
Team	W		L	PCT	W		L	PCT
Northern
No. 15 Washington ^{x}‍‍‍^{y}	20	–	4	.833	46	–	20	.697
Oregon State ‍‍‍	18	–	6	.750	38	–	12	.760
Washington State ‍‍‍	7	–	17	.292	13	–	42	.236
Portland State ‍‍‍	3	–	21	.125	10	–	43	.189
Southern
No. 4 Stanford ^{x}‍‍‍^{y}	21	–	9	.700	45	–	20	.692
No. 8 UCLA ‍‍‍^{y}	19	–	11	.633	45	–	21	.682
No. 13 Southern California ‍‍‍^{y}	17	–	13	.567	42	–	20	.677
No. 14 Arizona State ‍‍‍^{y}	16	–	14	.533	39	–	22	.639
Arizona ‍‍‍	13	–	17	.433	32	–	26	.552
California ‍‍‍	4	–	26	.133	21	–	38	.356
x – Division champion y – Invited to the NCAA tournament As of June 30, 1997; Rankings from Collegiate Baseball

1997 Patriot League baseball standings
	Conf.						Overall
Team	W		L		T	PCT	W		L		T	PCT
Army ‍†‍‡‍	15	–	5	–	0	.750	26	–	20	–	1	.564
Navy ‍‍‍	12	–	6	–	0	.667	19	–	27	–	0	.413
Bucknell ‍‍‍	10	–	10	–	0	.500	25	–	24	–	1	.510
Lehigh ‍‍‍	9	–	11	–	0	.450	18	–	24	–	1	.430
Lafayette ‍‍‍	7	–	12	–	0	.368	11	–	26	–	0	.297
Holy Cross ‍‍‍	5	–	14	–	0	.263	11	–	25	–	0	.306
‡ – Tournament champion As of June 30, 1997; Rankings from Collegiate Baseball

1997 Southeastern Conference baseball standings
	Conf.				Overall
Team	W		L	PCT	W		L	PCT
Eastern
No. 20 Florida ^{x}‍‍‍^{y}	17	–	13	.567	40	–	24	.625
No. 22 Tennessee ^{x}‍‍‍^{y}	17	–	13	.567	42	–	19	.689
Vanderbilt ‍‍‍	14	–	16	.467	31	–	24	.564
South Carolina ‍‍‍	13	–	17	.433	33	–	24	.579
Kentucky ‍‍‍	10	–	20	.333	20	–	34	.370
Georgia ‍‍‍	8	–	22	.267	28	–	27	.509
Western
No. 1 LSU ^{x}‍†‍‍^{y}	22	–	7	.759	57	–	13	.814
No. 2 Alabama ‍‍‡‍^{y}	20	–	9	.690	56	–	14	.800
No. 6 Mississippi State ‍‍‍^{y}	19	–	11	.633	47	–	21	.691
No. 5 Auburn ‍‍‍^{y}	17	–	12	.586	50	–	17	.746
Arkansas ‍‍‍	15	–	14	.517	36	–	20	.643
Ole Miss ‍‍‍	6	–	24	.200	22	–	31	.415
x – Division champion † – Conference champion ‡ – Tournament champion y – Invited to the NCAA tournament As of June 30, 1997; Rankings from Collegiate Baseball

1997 Southern Conference baseball standings
	Conf.				Overall
Team	W		L	PCT	W		L	PCT
Western Carolina ‍†‍‡‍^{y}	18	–	6	.750	42	–	20	.677
Georgia Southern ‍†‍‍	18	–	6	.750	34	–	26	.567
The Citadel ‍‍‍	16	–	7	.696	37	–	21	.638
Furman ‍‍‍	13	–	11	.542	29	–	23	.558
East Tennessee State ‍‍‍	11	–	11	.500	21	–	24	.467
Davidson ‍‍‍	8	–	15	.348	18	–	34	.346
Appalachian State ‍‍‍	8	–	16	.333	16	–	32	.333
VMI ‍‍‍	6	–	13	.316	13	–	35	.271
Marshall ‍‍‍	4	–	17	.190	7	–	39	.152
† – Conference champion ‡ – SoCon Tournament champion y – Invited to the NCAA tournament As of June 30, 1997; Rankings from Collegiate Baseball

1997 Southland Conference baseball standings
	Conf.						Overall
Team	W		L		T	PCT	W		L		T	PCT
Louisiana
Northwestern State ^{x}‍‍‍	19	–	9	–	0	.679	35	–	22	–	0	.614
Northeast Louisianae ‍‍‍	17	–	11	–	0	.607	33	–	21	–	0	.611
McNeese State ‍‍‍	11	–	19	–	0	.367	19	–	31	–	1	.382
Nicholls State ‍‍‍	9	–	19	–	0	.321	19	–	35	–	0	.352
Texas
Southwest Texas State ^{x}‍‍‡‍^{y}	18	–	11	–	0	.621	38	–	26	–	0	.594
Sam Houston State ‍‍‍	17	–	11	–	0	.607	36	–	27	–	0	.571
Texas–Arlington ‍‍‍	12	–	17	–	0	.414	22	–	35	–	0	.386
Texas–San Antonio ‍‍‍	12	–	18	–	0	.400	20	–	36	–	0	.357
x – Division champion ‡ – Tournament champion y – Invited to the NCAA tournament As of June 30, 1997; Rankings from Collegiate Baseball

1997 Trans America Athletic Conference baseball standings
	Conf.						Overall
Team	W		L		T	PCT	W		L		T	PCT
South
Stetson ^{x}‍‍‍^{y}	10	–	8	–	0	.556	37	–	26	–	1	.586
FIU ^{x}‍‍‍^{y}	10	–	8	–	0	.556	42	–	21	–	0	.667
Florida Atlantic ‍‍‍	8	–	9	–	0	.471	32	–	24	–	0	.571
UCF ‍‍‡‍^{y}	7	–	10	–	0	.412	40	–	24	–	0	.625
East
Mercer ^{x}‍‍‍	12	–	6	–	0	.667	36	–	23	–	0	.610
Georgia State ‍‍‍	10	–	8	–	0	.556	23	–	30	–	0	.434
Campbell ‍‍‍	7	–	11	–	0	.389	17	–	40	–	0	.298
College of Charleston ‍‍‍	7	–	11	–	0	.389	25	–	29	–	1	.464
West
Jacksonville State ^{x}‍†‍‍	14	–	4	–	0	.778	39	–	13	–	0	.750
Southeastern Louisiana ‍‍‍	11	–	7	–	0	.611	34	–	24	–	0	.586
Samford ‍‍‍	8	–	10	–	0	.444	31	–	29	–	0	.517
Centenary ‍‍‍	3	–	15	–	0	.167	11	–	39	–	0	.220
x – Division champion † – Conference champion ‡ – Tournament champion y – Invited to the NCAA tournament As of June 30, 1997; Rankings from Collegiate Baseball

1997 Western Athletic Conference baseball standings
	Conf.				Overall
Team	W		L	PCT	W		L	PCT
North
Utah ^{x}‍‍‍	22	–	8	.733	36	–	21	.632
BYU ‍‍‍	21	–	9	.700	37	–	18	.673
Air Force ‍‍‍	6	–	24	.200	13	–	37	.260
Grand Canyon ‍‍‍	5	–	25	.167	13	–	43	.232
South
No. 7 Rice ^{x}‍‍‡‍^{y}	20	–	9	.690	47	–	16	.746
TCU ‍‍‍	15	–	15	.500	26	–	27	.491
UNLV ‍‍‍	10	–	19	.345	24	–	31	.436
New Mexico ‍‍‍	10	–	20	.333	25	–	32	.439
West
San Jose State ^{x}‍‍‍	20	–	10	.667	38	–	21	.644
No. 18 Fresno State ‍‍‍^{y}	19	–	11	.633	40	–	28	.588
San Diego State ‍‍‍	17	–	13	.567	41	–	22	.651
Hawaii ‍‍‍	14	–	16	.467	22	–	34	.393
x – Division champion ‡ – Tournament champion y – Invited to the NCAA tournament As of June 30, 1997; Rankings from Collegiate Baseball

== College World Series ==
The 1997 season marked the fifty first NCAA baseball tournament, which culminated with the eight team College World Series. The College World Series was held in Omaha, Nebraska. The eight teams played a double-elimination format, with LSU claiming their fourth championship with a 13–6 win over Alabama in the final.

=== Bracket ===
First round
1	Alabama	3
8	Mississippi State	2
4	UCLA	3
5	Miami (FL)	7^{12}
8	Mississippi State	7
4	UCLA	5
2	LSU	5
7	Rice	4
3	Stanford	8
6	Auburn	3
7	Rice	1
6	Auburn	10

Second round
1	Alabama	1
5	Miami (FL)	6
1	Alabama	9
8	Mississippi State	5
2	LSU	10
3	Stanford	5
3	Stanford	11
6	Auburn	4

Semifinals
5	Miami (FL)	6	2
1	Alabama	8	8
2	LSU	13	—
3	Stanford	9	—

Finals
1	Alabama	6
2	LSU	13

== Coaching changes ==
This table lists programs that changed head coaches at any point from the first day of the 1997 season until the day before the first day of the 1998 season.

Team	Former coach	Interim coach	New coach	Reason
Coppin State	Jason Booker		Paul Blair	
East Carolina	Gary Overton		Keith LeClair	
Hartford	Jim Bretz		Bob Nenna	
Iowa	Duane Banks		Scott Broghamer	Banks retired after 28 seasons following 10th-place Big Ten finish in 1997.
James Madison	Kevin Anderson		Spanky McFarland	
La Salle	Frank DiMichele		Larry Conti	
Liberty	Johnny Hunton		Dave Pastors	
McNeese State	Jim Ricklefsen		Mike Bianco	
Mississippi State	Ron Polk		Pat McMahon	Polk retired following 1997 CWS appearance.
Mount St. Mary's	Ray Ruffing		Scott Thomson	
Nebraska	John Sanders		Dave van Horn	Sanders fired after 20 seasons following 10th-place Big 12 finish in 1997.
Northern Illinois	Spanky McFarland		Frank Del Medico	McFarland left to become head coach at James Madison.
Northwestern State	Dave van Horn		John Cohen	Van Horn left after an SLC Louisiana Division title to become head coach at Nebraska.
Pittsburgh	Mark Jackson		Joe Jordano	
Portland	Terry Pollreisz		Chris Sperry	
Princeton	Tom O'Connell		Scott Bradley	
Samford	Tommy Walker		Tim Parenton	
Santa Clara	John Oldham		Mike Cummins	
Southern Miss	Hill Denson		Corky Palmer	
Southern Utah	Jeff Scholzen		DeLynn Corry	
UTPA	Al Ogletree		Reggie Tredaway	
Western Carolina	Keith LeClair		Rodney Hennon	Hennon left after a SoCon Tournament title to become head coach at East Carolina.
