= 1997 Southland Conference baseball tournament =

- Teams: 6
- Format: Double-elimination
- Finals site: Warhawk Field; Monroe, Louisiana
- Champions: Southwest Texas State (1st title)
- Winning coach: Howard Bushong (1st title)
- MVP: Jeremy Fikac (Southwest Texas State)

1997 Southland Conference baseball standings
	Conf.						Overall
Team	W		L		T	PCT	W		L		T	PCT
Louisiana
Northwestern State ^{x}‍‍‍	19	–	9	–	0	.679	35	–	22	–	0	.614
Northeast Louisianae ‍‍‍	17	–	11	–	0	.607	33	–	21	–	0	.611
McNeese State ‍‍‍	11	–	19	–	0	.367	19	–	31	–	1	.382
Nicholls State ‍‍‍	9	–	19	–	0	.321	19	–	35	–	0	.352
Texas
Southwest Texas State ^{x}‍‍‡‍^{y}	18	–	11	–	0	.621	38	–	26	–	0	.594
Sam Houston State ‍‍‍	17	–	11	–	0	.607	36	–	27	–	0	.571
Texas–Arlington ‍‍‍	12	–	17	–	0	.414	22	–	35	–	0	.386
Texas–San Antonio ‍‍‍	12	–	18	–	0	.400	20	–	36	–	0	.357
x – Division champion ‡ – Tournament champion y – Invited to the NCAA tournament As of June 30, 1997; Rankings from Collegiate Baseball

The 1997 Southland Conference baseball tournament was held from May 14 to 17, 1997 to determine the champion of the Southland Conference in the sport of college baseball for the 1997 season. The event pitted the top six finishers from the conference's regular season in a double-elimination tournament held at Warhawk Field, home field of Northeast Louisiana in Monroe, Louisiana. Second-seeded Southwest Texas State won their first championship and claimed the automatic bid to the 1997 NCAA Division I baseball tournament.

== Seeding and format ==
The top six finishers from the regular season were seeded one through six. They played a double-elimination tournament.

Team	W	L	T	Pct	Seed
Louisiana Division
Northwestern State	19	9	.679	—	1
Northeast Louisiana	17	11	.607	2	4
McNeese State	11	19	.367	9	—
Nicholls State	9	19	.321	10	—

Team	W	L	T	Pct	Seed
Texas Division
Southwest Texas State	18	11	.621	—	2
Sam Houston State	17	11	.607	.5	3
Texas–Arlington	12	17	.414	6	5
UTSA	12	18	.400	6.5	6

== Bracket and results ==
First round
1	Northwestern State	3
6	UTSA	5
3	Sam Houston State	9
4	Northeast Louisiana	8
2	Southwest Texas State	10
5	Texas–Arlington	11

Second round
6	UTSA	5
4	Northeast Louisiana	3
3	Sam Houston State	12
5	Texas–Arlington	3
1	Northwestern State	3
2	Southwest Texas State	12

Third round
6	UTSA	3
3	Sam Houston State	2
5	Texas–Arlington	1
2	Southwest Texas State	14

Semifinals
3	Sam Houston State	4
2	Southwest Texas State	16

Final
6	UTSA	2	7
2	Southwest Texas State	8	9

== All-Tournament Team ==
The following players were named to the All-Tournament Team.

Pos.	Name	School
P	David Balcer	Northwestern State
P	Jeremy Fikac	Southwest Texas State
C	Chad Spear	Southwest Texas State
1B	Ron Thames	Sam Houston State
2B	Brad Prihoda	Sam Houston State
3B	Brad Eubank	Southwest Texas State
SS	Tim Linville	Texas–Arlington
OF	Sean Alvarez	UTSA
OF	Matt Schnabel	Southwest Texas State
OF	Colin Wissen	Southwest Texas State
DH	Tony Gee	UTSA

=== Most Valuable Player ===
Jeremy Fikac was named Tournament Most Valuable Player. Fikac was a pitcher for Southwest Texas State.
