= 2014 Louisiana–Lafayette Ragin' Cajuns baseball team =

American college baseball season

2014 Louisiana–Lafayette Ragin' Cajuns baseball

Sun Belt Conference Regular season Champions Sun Belt Conference Tournament champions Lafayette Regionals Champions Lafayette Super Regionals Appearance
- Conference: Sun Belt Conference

Ranking
- Coaches: No. 9
- Record: 58-10 (26-4 SBC)
- Head coach: Tony Robichaux (20th season)
- Assistant coaches: Anthony Babineaux; Matt Deggs
- Home stadium: M. L. Tigue Moore Field

2014 Sun Belt Conference baseball standings
	Conf.				Overall
Team	W		L	PCT	W		L	PCT
No. 9 Louisiana–Lafayette ‍†‍‡‍^{y}	26	–	4	.867	58	–	10	.853
Texas–Arlington ‍‍‍	19	–	11	.633	32	–	26	.552
Arkansas State ‍‍‍	18	–	12	.600	32	–	26	.552
Texas State ‍‍‍	16	–	14	.533	30	–	28	.517
WKU ‍‍‍	15	–	15	.500	29	–	28	.509
Troy ‍‍‍	11	–	18	.379	25	–	32	.439
South Alabama ‍‍‍	11	–	18	.379	22	–	33	.400
Arkansas–Little Rock ‍‍‍	11	–	19	.367	25	–	29	.463
Georgia State ‍‍‍	11	–	19	.367	25	–	31	.446
Louisiana–Monroe ‍‍‍	11	–	19	.367	23	–	36	.390
† – Conference champion ‡ – Tournament champion y – Invited to the NCAA tournament As of June 30, 2014; Rankings from Collegiate Baseball

The 2014 Louisiana–Lafayette Ragin' Cajuns baseball team represented the University of Louisiana at Lafayette in the 2014 NCAA Division I baseball season. The Ragin' Cajuns played their home games at M. L. Tigue Moore Field and were led by twentieth year head coach Tony Robichaux.

== Preseason ==
=== Sun Belt Conference Coaches Poll ===
The Sun Belt Conference Coaches Poll was released on February 10, 2014. Louisiana-Lafayette was picked to finish first in the Sun Belt with 98 votes and 8 first-place votes.

Coaches poll
Predicted finish	Team	Votes (1st place)
1	Louisiana-Lafayette	98 (8)
2	South Alabama	82 (1)
3	Troy	77
4	Texas State	57
5	UT Arlington	48
6	Western Kentucky	45
7	Arkansas State	41
7	Georgia State	41
9	Arkansas-Little Rock	33
10	Louisiana-Monroe	27 (1)

=== Preseason All-Sun Belt team ===
- Austin Robichaux (ULL, JR, Pitcher)
- Matt Bell (USA, SR, Pitcher)
- Shane McCain (TROY, SR, Pitcher)
- Ian Tompkins (WKU, JR, Pitcher)
- Michael Strentz (ULL, RS-JR, Catcher)
- Zach George (ARST, RS-JR, 1st Base)
- Caden Bailey (GSU, JR, 2nd Base)
- Blake Trahan (ULL, SO, Shortstop)
- Tyler Girouard (ULL, JR, 3rd Base)
- Seth Harrison (ULL, SR, Outfield)
- Matt Shortall (UTA, SR, Outfield)
- Regan Flaherty (WKU, SR, Outfield)
- Caleb Adams (ULL, JR, Designated Hitter)
- Scott Wilcox (WKU, SR, Utility)

==== 2015 Sun Belt Preseason Player of the Year ====
- Caleb Adams (ULL, JR, Designated Hitter)

==== 2015 Sun Belt Preseason Pitcher of the Year ====
- Austin Robichaux (ULL, JR, Pitcher)

== Roster ==
2014 Louisiana-Lafayette Ragin' Cajuns roster
Pitchers: 1 Connor Toups - Redshirt Freshman; 5 Riley Cooper - Freshman; 12 Austin Robichaux - Junior; 14 Greg Milhorn - Junior; 17 Martin Anderson - Junior; 18 Hayden Guidry - Freshman; 20 Cody Boutte - Senior; 24 Chris Griffitt - Senior; 26 Matt Hicks - Senior; 29 Chris Charpentier - Freshman; 30 Ben Carter - Senior; 33 Nick Zaunbrecher - Sophomore; 35 Matt Plint - Senior; 38 Trace Guidry - Freshman; 41 Reagan Bazar - Freshman; 44 Carson Baranik - Junior	Catchers: 6 Nick Thurman - Sophomore; 11 Michael Strentz - Junior; Infielders: 4 Blake Trahan - Sophomore; 9 Tyler Girouard - Junior; 10 Joe Robbins - Sophomore; 19 Jace Conrad - Junior; 32 Chase Compton - Senior; 39 Greg Davis - Junior; Outfielders: 2 Adam Angelle - Junior; 13 Caleb Adams - Junior; 15 Dylan Butler - Junior; 23 Ryan Wilson - Senior; 25 Kyle Clement - Junior; 27 Seth Harrison - Junior; Utility Players: 7 Ryan Leonards - Senior; 31 Evan Powell - Junior

=== Coaching staff ===
2014 Louisiana-Lafayette Ragin' Cajuns coaching staff
- Tony Robichaux – Head Coach – 20th year
- Anthony Babineaux – Associate head coach – 20th year
- Matt Deggs – Assistant Coach – 3rd year
- Chris Domingue – Director of Baseball Operations – 12th year

== Schedule and results ==
Legend
	Louisiana-Lafayette win
	Louisiana-Lafayette loss
	Postponement
**Bold**	Louisiana-Lafayette team member

2014 Louisiana–Lafayette Ragin' Cajuns baseball game log
Regular season (49-7)

February (9-1)
Date	Opponent	Rank	Site/stadium	Score	Win	Loss	Save	TV	Attendance	Overall record	SBC record
Feb. 14	Eastern Illinois	No. 14	M. L. Tigue Moore Field • Lafayette, LA	**L** 1-5	Johansmeier (1-0)	**Robichaux** (0-1)	Greenfield (1)	None	3,718	0-1	
Feb. 15	Eastern Illinois	No. 14	M. L. Tigue Moore Field • Lafayette, LA	**W** 1-0	**Baranik** (1-0)	Borens (0-1)	**Wilson** (1)	None	3,627	1-1	
Feb. 15	Eastern Illinois	No. 14	M. L. Tigue Moore Field • Lafayette, LA	**W** 13-0	**Milhorn** (1-0)	Slazinik (0-1)	None	None	3,627	2-1	
Feb. 16	Eastern Illinois	No. 14	M. L. Tigue Moore Field • Lafayette, LA	**W** 9-8	**Charpentier** (1-0)	Stenger (0-1)	**Bazar** (1)	None	3,211	3-1	
Feb. 19	at Northwestern State	No. 14	H. Alvin Brown–C. C. Stroud Field • Natchitoches, LA	**W** 5-3	**Hicks** (1-0)	Tanner (0-1)	**Bazar** (2)	None	609	4-1	
Feb. 21	at Southern Miss		Pete Taylor Park • Hattiesburg, MS	**W** 6-2	**Robichaux** (1-1)	Johnson (0-1)	None	None	3,096	5–1	
Feb. 22	at Southern Miss		Pete Taylor Park • Hattiesburg, MS	**W** 8-5 (12 inn)	**Bazar** (1-0)	Milton (0-1)	**Hicks** (1)	None	3,105	6-1	
Feb. 22	at Southern Miss		Pete Taylor Park • Hattiesburg, MS	9**W** -5	**Boutte** (1-0)	Nunez (0-1)	None	None	2,916	7-1	
Feb. 25	at No. 1 LSU	No. 10	Alex Box Stadium, Skip Bertman Field • Baton Rouge, LA	**W** 4-1	**Milhorn** (2-0)	Glenn (1-1)	None	CST	11,231	8-1	
Feb. 28	No. 21 Alabama	No. 10	M. L. Tigue Moore Field • Lafayette, LA	**W** 2-0	**Robichaux** (2-1)	Turnbill (0-1)	None	None	4,040	9-1	

March (17-2)
Date	Opponent	Rank	Site/stadium	Score	Win	Loss	Save	TV	Attendance	Overall record	SBC record
Mar. 1	No. 21 Alabama	No. 10	M. L. Tigue Moore Field • Lafayette, LA	**W** 6-0	**Baranik** (2-0)	Kamplain (1-1)	None	None	4,004	10-1	
Mar. 2	No. 21 Alabama	No. 10	M. L. Tigue Moore Field • Lafayette, LA	**L** 6-12	Keller (3-0)	**Milhorn** (2-1)	None	None	4,031	10-2	
Mar. 5	Southeastern Louisiana	No. 7	M. L. Tigue Moore Field • Lafayette, LA	Postponed to April 30 due to a threat of inclement weather in Lafayette.							
Mar. 7	Texas Southern	No. 7	M. L. Tigue Moore Field • Lafayette, LA	**W** 5-4	**Hicks** (2-0)	Gomez (0-3)	None	None	3,734	11-2	
Mar. 8	Texas Southern	No. 7	M. L. Tigue Moore Field • Lafayette, LA	**W** 13-0	**Baranik** (3-0)	Rios (2-2)	None	None	3,644	12-2	
Mar. 9	Texas Southern	No. 7	M. L. Tigue Moore Field • Lafayette, LA	**W** 7-2	**Plitt** (1-0)	Pearson (0-1)	None	None	3,461	13-2	
Mar. 12	at Tulane	No. 6	Greer Field at Turchin Stadium • New Orleans, LA	**W** 7-4	**Wilson** (1-0)	Flowers (0-1)	**Bazar** (3)	None	2,217	14-2	
Mar. 14	at Louisiana-Monroe	No. 6	Warhawk Field • Monroe, LA	**W** 4-1	**Robichaux** (3-1)	Hunt (1-1)	None	None	1,275	15-2	1-0
Mar. 15	at Louisiana-Monroe	No. 6	Warhawk Field • Monroe, LA	**W** 14-1	**Baranik** (4-0)	Hermeling (0-2)	None	None	882	16-2	2-0
Mar. 16	at Louisiana-Monroe	No. 6	Warhawk Field • Monroe, LA	**W** 21-2 (7 inn)	**Boutte** (2-0)	Dumaine (1-3)	None	None	1,001	17-2	3-0
Mar. 18	Nicholls State	No. 5	M. L. Tigue Moore Field • Lafayette, LA	**W** 5-1	**Wilson** (2-0)	Deemes (1-2)	**Plitt** (1)	None	3,430	18-2	
Mar. 19	at Nicholls State	No. 5	Ben Meyer Diamond at Ray E. Didier Field • Thibodaux, LA	**W** 7-1 (11 inn)	**Bazar** (2-0)	Sinibaldi (0-1)	None	None	470	19-2	
Mar. 21	Georgia State	No. 5	M. L. Tigue Moore Field • Lafayette, LA	**W** 8-3	**Robichaux** (4-1)	Anderson (2-2)	None	None	3,729	20–2	4-0
Mar. 22	Georgia State	No. 5	M. L. Tigue Moore Field • Lafayette, LA	**W** 14-6	**Baranik** (5-0)	Ford (0-1)	None	None	3,624	21-2	5-0
Mar. 23	Georgia State	No. 5	M. L. Tigue Moore Field • Lafayette, LA	**W** 5-3	**Boutte** (3-0)	Fessler (1-3)	**Griffitt** (1)	None	3,338	22-2	6-0
Mar. 25	Northwestern State	No. 1	M. L. Tigue Moore Field • Lafayette, LA	**W** 10-1	**Wilson** (3-0)	Bear (0-1)	**Plitt** (2)	None	3,586	23-2	
Mar. 26	Southern	No. 1	M. L. Tigue Moore Field • Lafayette, LA	**W** 17-3	**Hicks** (3-0)	Polk (0-1)	None	None	3,361	24-2	
Mar. 29	Western Kentucky	No. 1	M. L. Tigue Moore Field • Lafayette, LA	**L** 3-14	Hageman (2-1)	**Robichaux** (4-2)	None	None		24-3	6-1
Mar. 29	Western Kentucky	No. 1	M. L. Tigue Moore Field • Lafayette, LA	**W** 10-9	**Baranik** (6-0)	Clay (3-2)	**Bazar** (4)	None	4,266	25-3	7-1
Mar. 31	Western Kentucky	No. 1	M. L. Tigue Moore Field • Lafayette, LA	**W** 7-4	**Toups** (1-0)	Thompson (2-2)	None	None	3,712	26-3	8-1

April (15-3)
Date	Opponent	Rank	Site/stadium	Score	Win	Loss	Save	TV	Attendance	Overall record	SBC record
Apr. 1	Tulane	No. 2	M. L. Tigue Moore Field • Lafayette, LA	**W** 16-0	**Hicks** (4-0)	Merrill (0-2)	None	None	3,961	27-3	
Apr. 4	at Troy	No. 2	Riddle-Pace Field • Troy, AL	**W** 15-4	**Baranik** (7-0)	Hicks (2-5)	None	None	1,184	28-3	9-1
Apr. 5	at Troy	No. 2	Riddle-Pace Field • Troy, AL	**W** 11-8	**Wilson** (4-0)	McCain (3-3)	**Bazar** (5)	Sun Belt Network	1,389	29-3	10-1
Apr. 5	at Troy	No. 2	Riddle-Pace Field • Troy, AL	**W** 11-0	**Boutte** (4-0)	McGowan (2-3)	None	None	1,389	30-3	11-1
Apr. 8	New Orleans	No. 1	M. L. Tigue Moore Field • Lafayette, LA	**L** 7-8	Laigast (2-2)	**Zaunbrecher** (0-1)	McKingney (1)	None	4,158	30-4	
Apr. 9	at McNeese State	No. 1	Joe Miller Ballpark • Lake Charles, LA	**W** 14-8	**Milhorn** (3-1)	Prejean (3-2)	None	None	1,919	31-4	
Apr. 11	Arkansas-Little Rock	No. 1	M. L. Tigue Moore Field • Lafayette, LA	**W** 7-0	**Baranik** (8-0)	McDonald (2-4)	None	None	3,817	32-4	12-1
Apr. 12	Arkansas-Little Rock	No. 1	M. L. Tigue Moore Field • Lafayette, LA	**W** 5-2	**Wilson** (5-0)	Thoele (0-2)	**Milhorn** (1)	None	4,439	33-4	13-1
Apr. 13	Arkansas-Little Rock	No. 1	M. L. Tigue Moore Field • Lafayette, LA	**W** 6-3	**Bouette** (5-0)	Allen (3-3)	**Bazar** (6)	None	3,518	34-4	14-1
Apr. 18	at UT Arlington	No. 2	Clay Gould Ballpark • Arlington, TX	**W** 9-5	**Bazar** (3-0)	Weaver (3-2)	None	None	563	35-4	15-1
Apr. 19	at UT Arlington	No. 2	Clay Gould Ballpark • Arlington, TX	**W** 9-5	**Robichaux** (5-2)	Schnedler (1-4)	**Milhorn** (2)	None	610	36-4	16-1
Apr. 20	at UT Arlington	No. 2	Clay Gould Ballpark • Arlington, TX	**L** 4-5	Tornberg (1-1)	**Milhorn** (3-2)	None	None	426	36-5	16-2
Apr. 22	McNeese State	No. 2	M. L. Tigue Moore Field • Lafayette, LA	**W** 8-0	**Hicks** (5-0)	Desabrais (0-2)	**Carter** (1)	None	4,033	37-5	
Apr. 25	Texas State	No. 2	M. L. Tigue Moore Field • Lafayette, LA	**W** 8-6	**Milhorn** (4-2)	Goebel (2-1)	**Wilson** (2)	None	3,846	38-5	17-2
Apr. 26	Texas State	No. 2	M. L. Tigue Moore Field • Lafayette, LA	**L** 3-10	Black (4-4)	**Baranik** (8-1)	None	None	4,197	38-6	17-3
Apr. 27	Texas State	No. 2	M. L. Tigue Moore Field • Lafayette, LA	**W** 2-0	**Boutte** (6-0)	Humpal (3-4)	**Wilson** (3)	None	3,621	39-6	18-3
Apr. 29	at Southeastern Louisiana	No. 2	Pat Kennelly Diamond at Alumni Field • Hammond, LA	**W** 6-5	**Milhorn** (5-2)	Hills (3-3)	**Wilson** (4)	None	1,088	40-6	
Apr. 30	Southeastern Louisiana	No. 2	M. L. Tigue Moore Field • Lafayette, LA	**W** 10-8	**Carter** (1-0)	Von Rosenberg (1-1)	**Harrison** (1)	None	3,839	41-6	

May (8-1)
Date	Opponent	Rank	Site/stadium	Score	Win	Loss	Save	TV	Attendance	Overall record	SBC record
May 2	at Arkansas State	No. 2	Tomlinson Stadium-Kell Field • Jonesboro, AR	**W** 6-5	**Robichaux** (6-2)	Owen (5-4)	**Wilson** (5)	None	713	42-6	19-3
May 3	at Arkansas State	No. 2	Tomlinson Stadium-Kell Field • Jonesboro, AR	**W** 7-0	**Baranik** (9-1)	Wallace (3-4)	None	None	1,009	43-6	20-3
May 4	at Arkansas State	No. 2	Tomlinson Stadium-Kell Field • Jonesboro, AR	**L** 4-6	Zuber (2-0)	**Hicks** (5-1)	None	None	811	43-7	20-4
May 10	at South Alabama	No. 3	Eddie Stanky Field • Mobile, AL	**W** 5-2	**Robichaux** (7-2)	St. John (6-2)	**Wilson** (6)	None		44-7	21-4
May 10	at South Alabama	No. 3	Eddie Stanky Field • Mobile, AL	**W** 8-7	**Bazar** (4-0)	Traylor (1-2)	None	None	1,633	45-7	22-4
May 11	at South Alabama	No. 3	Eddie Stanky Field • Mobile, AL	**W** 13-3	**Boutte** (7-0)	Soleymani (0-3)	None	None	1,196	46-7	23-4
May 15	Louisiana-Monroe	No. 3	M. L. Tigue Moore Field • Lafayette, LA	**W** 12-9	**Hicks** (6-1)	Dumaine (3-5)	**Wilson** (7)	None	3,750	47-7	24-4
May 16	Louisiana-Monroe	No. 3	M. L. Tigue Moore Field • Lafayette, LA	**W** 9-1	**Baranik** (10-1)	Hunt (2-5)	**Plitt** (3)	None	4,303	48-7	25-4
May 17	Louisiana-Monroe	No. 3	M. L. Tigue Moore Field • Lafayette, LA	**W** 6-5	**Anderson** (1-0)	Bray (8-5)	None	None	4,302	49-7	26-4

Postseason (9-3)

SBC Tournament (4-0)
Date	Opponent	(Seed) / Rank	Site/stadium	Score	Win	Loss	Save	TV	Attendance	Overall record	SBC record
May 21	vs. (8) Louisiana-Monroe	(1) / No. 2	Eddie Stanky Field • Mobile, AL	**W** 7-3	**Plitt** (2-0)	Dumaine (3-6)	None	Sun Belt Network	459	50-7	
May 22	vs. (4) Texas State	(1) / No. 2	Eddie Stanky Field • Mobile, AL	**W** 11-4	**Hicks** (7-1)	Humpal (4-6)	None	Sun Belt Network	494	51-7	
May 24	vs. (4) Texas State	(1) / No. 2	Eddie Stanky Field • Mobile, AL	**W** 4-3	**Boutte** (8-0)	Bein (1-5)	**Plitt** (4)	Sun Belt Network		52-7	
May 25	vs. (2) UT Arlington	(1) / No. 2	Eddie Stanky Field • Mobile, AL	**W** 6-5	**Anderson** (2-0)	Weaver (4-3)	**Harrison** (2)	Sun Belt Network	812	53-7	

NCAA Division I Baseball Championship (5-3)
Date	Opponent	Seed/Rank	Site/stadium	Score	Win	Loss	Save	TV	Attendance	Overall record	SBC record
Lafayette Regionals
May 30	vs. Jackson State	No. 1	M. L. Tigue Moore Field • Lafayette, LA	**L** 0-1	Anthonia (4-0)	**Robichaux** (7-3)	Juday (3)	ESPN3	3,581	53-8	
May 31	vs. San Diego State	No. 1	M. L. Tigue Moore Field • Lafayette, LA	**W** 9-2	**Baranik** (11-1)	Derby (8-4)	None	ESPN3	3,591	54-8	
Jun. 1	vs. Jackson State	No. 1	M. L. Tigue Moore Field • Lafayette, LA	**W** 11-1	**Hicks** (8-1)	Wingard (2-2)	None	ESPN3	3,601	55-8	
Jun. 1	vs. No. 17 Mississippi State	No. 1	M. L. Tigue Moore Field • Lafayette, LA	**W** 14-8	**Boutte** (9-0)	Mitchell (8-5)	None	ESPN3	3,729	56-8	
Jun. 2	vs. No. 17 Mississippi State	No. 1	M. L. Tigue Moore Field • Lafayette, LA	**W** 5-3	**Wilson** (6-0)	Laster (0-1)	**Plitt** (5)	ESPN3	3,920	57-8	
Lafayette Super Regionals
Jun. 7	vs. No. 6 Ole Miss	No. 1	M. L. Tigue Moore Field • Lafayette, LA	**W** 9-5	**Robichaux** (8-3)	Ellis (10-2)	None	ESPN2	4,278	58-8	
Jun. 8	vs. No. 6 Ole Miss	No. 1	M. L. Tigue Moore Field • Lafayette, LA	**L** 2-5	Greenwood (3-1)	**Baranik** (11-2)	None	ESPN2	4,294	58-9	
Jun. 9	vs. No. 6 Ole Miss	No. 1	M. L. Tigue Moore Field • Lafayette, LA	**L** 4-10	Weathersby (3-1)	**Boutte** (9-1)	None	ESPN2	4,295	58-10	

Schedule source:

- Rankings are based on the team's current ranking in the Collegiate Baseball poll.

== Lafayette Regional ==
Lafayette Regional Teams
(1) Louisiana–Lafayette Ragin' Cajuns	(2) Mississippi State Bulldogs	(3) San Diego State Aztecs	(4) Jackson State Tigers

First Round
1	Louisiana–Lafayette	0
4	Jackson State	1
3	San Diego State	2
2	Mississippi State	5
Lower round 1
1	Louisiana–Lafayette	9
3	San Diego State	2

Semi-Finals
4	Jackson State	1
2	Mississippi State	3
Lower final
1	Louisiana–Lafayette	11
4	Jackson State	1

Finals
2	Mississippi State
1	Louisiana–Lafayette

== Lafayette Super Regional ==
Lafayette Super Regional Teams
(1) Louisiana–Lafayette Ragin' Cajuns	(2) Ole Miss Rebels

Game 1
Rank	Team	Score
	Ole Miss	5
6	Louisiana-Lafayette	9

Game 2
Rank	Team	Score
	Ole Miss	5
6	Louisiana-Lafayette	2

Game 3
Rank	Team	Score
	Ole Miss	10
6	Louisiana-Lafayette	4
