= 2014 Texas State Bobcats baseball team =

American college baseball season

2014 Texas State Bobcats baseball
- Conference: Sun Belt Conference
- Record: 30–28 (16–14 Sun Belt)
- Head coach: Ty Harrington (15th season)
- Assistant coaches: Jeremy Fikac (7th season); Mike Silva (2nd season); Daniel Fernandez (4th season)
- Home stadium: Bobcat Ballpark

2014 Sun Belt Conference baseball standings
	Conf.				Overall
Team	W		L	PCT	W		L	PCT
No. 9 Louisiana–Lafayette ‍†‍‡‍^{y}	26	–	4	.867	58	–	10	.853
Texas–Arlington ‍‍‍	19	–	11	.633	32	–	26	.552
Arkansas State ‍‍‍	18	–	12	.600	32	–	26	.552
Texas State ‍‍‍	16	–	14	.533	30	–	28	.517
WKU ‍‍‍	15	–	15	.500	29	–	28	.509
Troy ‍‍‍	11	–	18	.379	25	–	32	.439
South Alabama ‍‍‍	11	–	18	.379	22	–	33	.400
Arkansas–Little Rock ‍‍‍	11	–	19	.367	25	–	29	.463
Georgia State ‍‍‍	11	–	19	.367	25	–	31	.446
Louisiana–Monroe ‍‍‍	11	–	19	.367	23	–	36	.390
† – Conference champion ‡ – Tournament champion y – Invited to the NCAA tournament As of June 30, 2014; Rankings from Collegiate Baseball

The 2014 Texas State Bobcats baseball team represented Texas State University in the 2014 intercollegiate baseball season. Texas State competed in Division I of the National Collegiate Athletic Association (NCAA) in its inaugural season as a member of the Sun Belt Conference. The Bobcats played home games at Bobcat Ballpark on the university's campus in San Marcos, Texas. Fifteenth year head coach Ty Harrington led the Bobcats.

== Personnel ==
=== Coaches ===
2014 Texas State Bobcats baseball coaching staff
No.	Name	Position	Tenure	Alma mater
5	Ty Harrington	Head coach	15th season	University of Texas at Austin
28	Jeremy Fikac	Assistant coach	7th season	Southwest Texas State University (Note: Now known as Texas State University.)
39	Mike Silva	Assistant coach	2nd season	Bellevue University
25	Daniel Fernandez	Volunteer Assistant Coach	4th Season	Texas State University–San Marcos

== Schedule ==
2014 Texas State Bobcats baseball team game log
Date	Time	Opponent^{#}	Site/Event	TV	Win	Loss	Save	Result	Attd.	Record
February 14	3:55 PM	Michigan	Bobcat Ballpark • San Marcos, TX (Texas State Baseball Invitational)		Hunter Lemke (1–0)	Brett Adcock (0–1)		W 8–7	2,439	1–0
February 15	2:21 PM	Washington	Bobcat Ballpark • San Marcos, TX (Texas State Baseball Invitational)		Jeff Brigham (1–0)	Taylor Black (0–1)	Tyler Davis (1)	L 1–6	1,954	1–1
February 16	3:56 PM	Air Force	Bobcat Ballpark • San Marcos, TX (Texas State Baseball Invitational)		Austen Williams (1–0)	Steven Trojan (0–1)		W 6–0	1,904	2–1
February 18	4:30 PM	at #17 Rice	Reckling Park • Houston, TX		Zech Lemond (1–0)	Dylan Bein (0–1)		L 3–4	2,177	2–2
February 21	6:33 PM	UC Riverside	Bobcat Ballpark • San Marcos, TX		Lucas Humpai (1–0)	Jacob Smigeiski (1–1)		W 2–0	1,442	3–2
February 22	3:35 PM	UC Riverside	Bobcat Ballpark • San Marcos, TX		Hunter Lemke (2–0)	Jordan Kron (0–1)		W 8–7	1,359	4–2
February 23	1:01 PM	UC Riverside	Bobcat Ballpark • San Marcos, TX		Austen Williams (2–0)	Antonio Gonzales (0–1)		W 7–5	1,427	5–2
February 25	5:33 PM	Texas A&M–Corpus Christi	Bobcat Ballpark • San Marcos, TX		Cory Geisler (1–0)	Jacob Dorris (0–1)	Hunter Lemke (1)	W 6–4	1,059	6–2
February 28	6:32 PM	Wagner	Bobcat Ballpark • San Marcos, TX		Ross Goebel (1–0)	Mike Adams (0–1)	Hunter Lemke (2)	W 3–1	1,299	7–2
March 1	2:01 PM	Wagner	Bobcat Ballpark • San Marcos, TX		Taylor Black (1–1)	Matt Morris (0–2)	Hunter Lemke (3)	W 8–5	N/A	8–2
March 1	6:33 PM	Wagner	Bobcat Ballpark • San Marcos, TX		Cory Geisler (2–0)	Anthony Battaglia (0–1)	Hunter Lemke (4)	W 9–7	1,720	9–2
March 5	6:31 PM	Valparaiso	Bobcat Ballpark • San Marcos, TX		Ben Mahar (1–1)	Hunter Lemke (2–1)	Karch Kowalczyk (4)	L 2–3	1,138	9–3
March 7	5:58 PM	at Washington State	Bailey–Brayton Field • Pullman, WA		Matt Bower (1–0)	Tyler Davenport (0–1)	Ian Hamilton (2)	L 2–3	523	9–4
March 8	1:59 PM	at Washington State	Bailey–Brayton Field • Pullman, WA		Kellen Camus (1–0)	Taylor Black (1–2)	Ian Hamilton (3)	L 3–4	N/A	9–5
March 8	5:02 PM	at Washington State	Bailey–Brayton Field • Pullman, WA		Hunter Lemke (3–1)	Sam Triece (0–1)		W 5–3	711	10–5
March 11	6:36 PM	#14 Texas	Bobcat Ballpark • San Marcos, TX	KBVO	Ty Culbreth (1–0)	Dylan Bein (0–2)	John Curtiss (3)	L 3–6	2,603	10–6
March 14	6:31 PM	UT Arlington*	Bobcat Ballpark • San Marcos, TX		Taylor Black (2–2)	Jess Amedee (1–3)	Hunter Lemke (5)	W 10–5	1,265	11–6
March 15	3:01 PM	UT Arlington*	Bobcat Ballpark • San Marcos, TX		Hunter Lemke (4–2)	Jacob Moreland (0–1)		W 7–5	1,210	12–6
March 16	1:01 PM	UT Arlington*	Bobcat Ballpark • San Marcos, TX		Ross Goebel (2–0)	Zach Thompson (1–3)	Hunter Lemke (6)	W 3–1	1,154	13–6
March 18	6:37 PM	#21 Rice	Bobcat Ballpark • San Marcos, TX		Caleb Smith (1–0)	Chad Young (0–1)		L 1–14	2,013	13–7
March 21	6:04 PM	at WKU*	Nick Denes Field • Bowling Green, KY		Justin Hageman (1–1)	Taylor Black (2–3)		L 1–4	393	13–8
March 22	3:01 PM	at WKU*	Nick Denes Field • Bowling Green, KY		Austen Williams (3–0)	Austin Clay (3–1)	Justin Dellinger (1)	W 13–4	367	14–8
March 23	1:01 PM	at WKU*	Nick Denes Field • Bowling Green, KY		Lucas Humpal (2–0)	Jake Thompson (2–1)		W 7–5	303	15–8
March 25	6:00 PM	at #15 Texas	UFCU Disch–Falk Field • Austin, TX	LHN	Lukas Schiraldi (4–1)	Tyler Davenport (0–2)		L 1–5	5,163	15–9
March 28	6:00 PM	at Arkansas State*	Tomlinson Stadium–Kell Field • Jonesboro, AR		Hunter Lemke (5–1)	Cody Woodhouse (2–1)		W 4–3	N/A	16–9
March 29	4:00 PM	at Arkansas State*	Tomlinson Stadium–Kell Field • Jonesboro, AR		Colton Kibler (2–1)	Austen Williams (3–1)	Morgan Croft (4)	L 4–5	482	16–10
March 30	1:00 PM	at Arkansas State*	Tomlinson Stadium–Kell Field • Jonesboro, AR		Bradley Wallace (2–2)	Lucas Humpal (2–1)		L 1–4	276	16–11
April 1	6:35 PM	UTSA	Bobcat Ballpark • San Marcos, TX	KBVO	Andrew Boes (1–0)	Matt Sims (2–3)		W 7–6	1,613	17–11
April 4	6:30 PM	South Alabama*	Bobcat Ballpark • San Marcos, TX		Ben Taylor (3–1)	Hunter Lemke (5–2)		L 5–4	1,275	17–12
April 5	3:00 PM	South Alabama*	Bobcat Ballpark • San Marcos, TX		Austen Williams (4–1)	Kevin Hill (2–4)		W 2–0	1,728	18–12
April 6	1:00 PM	South Alabama*	Bobcat Ballpark • San Marcos, TX		Brandon Hallford (3–0)	Lucas Humpal (2–2)		L 2–7	1,108	18–13
April 8	6:30 PM	at Houston	Cougar Field • Houston, TX		Andrew Lantrip (2–0)	Dylan Bein (0–3)		L 1–7	1,227	18–14
April 11	6:00 PM	at UL Monroe*	Warhawk Field • Monroe, LA		Austen Williams (5–1)	Alex Hermeling (1–4)		W 12–5	916	19–14
April 12	6:00 PM	at UL Monroe*	Warhawk Field • Monroe, LA		Jared Dye (1–1)	Taylor Black (2–4)		L 12–17	1,201	19–15
April 13	1:00 PM	at UL Monroe*	Warhawk Field • Monroe, LA		Josh Leone (3–3)	Lucas Humpal (2–3)	Tyler Bray (5)	L 6–7	938	19–16
April 15	6:00 PM	at UTSA*	Roadrunner Field • San Antonio, TX		Jeremy Filipek (2–0)	Hunter Lemke (5–3)		L 2–7	335	19–17
April 18	6:30 PM	Georgia State*	Bobcat Ballpark • San Marcos, TX		Austen Williams (6–1)	Kenny Anderson (3–3)		W 8–1	1,221	20–17
April 19	3:00 PM	Georgia State*	Bobcat Ballpark • San Marcos, TX	SBCN	Taylor Black (3–4)	Nathan Bates (1–2)	Hunter Lemke (7)	W 4–2	1,263	21–17
April 20	1:00 PM	Georgia State*	Bobcat Ballpark • San Marcos, TX		Lucas Humpal (3–3)	Tyler McClure (2–7)	Hunter Lemke (8)	W 4–1	1,114	22–17
April 22	6:35 PM	at Baylor	Baylor Ballpark • Waco, TX		Drew Tolson (2–4)	Dylan Bein (0–4)	Josh Michalec (15)	L 3–4	2,591	22–18
April 23	6:35 PM	Baylor	Bobcat Ballpark • San Marcos, TX	KBVO	Cory Geisler (3–0)	Nick Lewis (1–1)	Hunter Lemke (9)	W 2–0	1,858	23–18
April 25	6:00 PM	at Louisiana*	M. L. Tigue Moore Field • Lafayette, LA		Greg Milhorn (4–2)	Ross Goebel (2–1)	Ryan Wilson (2)	L 6–8	3,846	23–19
April 26	6:00 PM	at Louisiana*	M. L. Tigue Moore Field • Lafayette, LA		Taylor Black (4–4)	Carson Baranik (8–1)		W 10–3	4,197	24–19
April 27	1:00 PM	at Louisiana*	M. L. Tigue Moore Field • Lafayette, LA		Cody Boutte (6–0)	Lucas Humpal (3–4)	Ryan Wilson (3)	L 0–2	3,621	24–20
April 29	6:35 PM	at Texas A&M	Olsen Field at Blue Bell Park • College Station, TX		Corey Ray (5–0)	Chad Young (0–2)		L 2–9	4,012	24–21
May 2	6:30 PM	Troy*	Bobcat Ballpark • San Marcos, TX		Austen Williams (7–1)	Shane McCain (3–4)	Dylan Bein (1)	W 7–3	1,353	25–21
May 3	3:00 PM	Troy*	Bobcat Ballpark • San Marcos, TX	SBCN	Taylor Black (5–4)	Tanner Hicks (2–8)	Hunter Lemke (10)	W 5–2	1,263	26–21
May 4	1:00 PM	Troy*	Bobcat Ballpark • San Marcos, TX		Lucas Humpal (4–4)	Ben Tidwell (1–2)	Dylan Bein (2)	W 6–2	1,298	27–21
May 9	6:30 PM	UALR*	Bobcat Ballpark • San Marcos, TX		Travis McDonald (3–6)	Austen Williams (7–2)	Ethan Schlechte (1)	L 3–0	1,235	27–22
May 10	3:00 PM	UALR*	Bobcat Ballpark • San Marcos, TX		Taylor Black (6–4)	Same Thoele (0–3)		W 6–2	1,169	28–22
May 11	1:00 PM	UALR*	Bobcat Ballpark • San Marcos, TX		Cameron Allen (5–5)	Lucas Humpal (4–5)	Tanner Rockwell (6)	L 2–3	1,350	28–23
May 15	6:30 PM	at UT Arlington*	Clay Gould Ballpark • Arlington, TX		Daniel Milliman (5–0)	Austen Williams (7–3)		L 7–11	361	28–24
May 16	6:30 PM	at UT Arlington*	Clay Gould Ballpark • Arlington, TX		Chase Weaver (4–2)	Cory Geisler (3–1)		L 0–1	339	28–25
May 17	2:00 PM	at UT Arlington*	Clay Gould Ballpark • Arlington, TX		Brad Vachon (5–5)	Justin Dellinger (0–1)	Keegan Hucul (2)	L 0–1	452	28–26
May 21	9:00 AM	WKU^	Stanky Field • Mobile, AL		Dylan Bein (1–4)	Brennan Pearson (0–2)		W 4–3	386	29–26
May 22	4:00 PM	Louisiana^	Stanky Field • Mobile, AL		Matt Hicks (7–1)	Lucas Humpal (4–6)		L 4–11	494	29–27
May 23	3:00 PM	UL Monroe^	Stanky Field • Mobile, AL		Austen Williams (8–3)	Alex Dumaine (3–7)	Hunter Lemke (11)	W 4–2	388	30–27
May 24	9:00 AM	Louisiana^	Stanky Field • Mobile, AL		Cody Boutte (8–0)	Dylan Bein (1–5)	Matt Plitt (4)	L 3–4	513	30–28
*Sun Belt Conference game. ^Sun Belt Conference Tournament game.^{#}Rankings from Collegiate Baseball released prior to game. All times are in Central Time.
