= Howard Bushong =

American baseball coach

Biographical details
- Born: June 4, 1953 (age 73)

Playing career
- 1975–1977: Texas

Coaching career (HC unless noted)
- 1990–1993: Texas (Asst.)
- 1994–1999: SW Texas State
- 2000: AZL Padres
- 2001–2003: GCL Tigers
- 2004–2009: Texas State (Asst.)
- 2009–2010: Oneonta/Connecticut Tigers

Accomplishments and honors

Championships
- Southland tournament: 1997, 1999; Southland Texas Div: 1996, 1997

Awards
- Southland Conference Coach of the Year: 1997

Howard Bushong is a former baseball coach at the high school, college, and minor league levels. He has moved between the college and professional levels several times, most recently coaching the Connecticut Tigers of the Class A New York–Penn League. He previously coached at Texas State as both a head coach (when it was known at Southwest Texas State) and an assistant, as well as the rookie league GCL Tigers and AZL Padres.

== Playing career ==
Bushong played for Texas from 1975–77, including the Longhorns championship run through the 1975 College World Series.

== Coaching career ==
Bushong began his coaching career at Tuloso Midway High School in Corpus Christi, TX. His next assignment was at Austin Westlake High School, winning two Texas state championships and amassing a 311–84 record over twelve years.

=== College coaching career ===
Bushong became an assistant coach at his alma mater, Texas, in 1990. After foure seasons, he took over as head coach of Southwest Texas State. Bushong led Southwest Texas State to their first ever division championships (Southland Texas Division, 1996 and 1997), Southland Conference baseball tournament title, and NCAA tournament appearance in 1997. He was named Southland Coach of the Year in 1996. His final season as head coach of SW Texas State was 1999, during which he again led the Bobcats to the Southland Tournament championship.

Following four seasons coaching at the minor league level, Bushong returned to the Bobcats, now known as Texas State, serving as an assistant coach to his successor, Ty Harrington, from 2004–2009.

=== Professional coaching career ===
In his first foray into managing at the professional level, Bushong took over the San Diego Padres affiliate AZL Padres for the 2000 season. He then took over the GCL Tigers, an affiliate of the Detroit Tigers. After three seasons with the Tigers organization, he returned to college coaching at Texas State.

In 2009, Bushong returned to professional ranks taking over the Class A Oneonta Tigers, who later moved to Norwich, Connecticut, to become the Connecticut Tigers. Bushong's final season as manager was 2010.

== Head coaching record ==
The following is a listing of Bushong's record as a head coach at the college level.

Record table
Season	Team	Overall	Conference	Standing	Postseason
SW Texas State Bobcats (Southland Conference) (1994–1999)
1994	SW Texas State	28–23	10–13	7th	
1995	SW Texas State	23–31	10–14	6th	
1996	SW Texas State	27–32	19–11	1st (Texas)	
1997	SW Texas State	38–26	18–11	1st (Texas)	Regional
1998	SW Texas State	28–28	13–11	5th	
1999	SW Texas State	37–32	15–12	3rd	Regional
SW Texas State:		181–172	85–72		
Total:		181–172			
National champion Postseason invitational champion Conference regular season champion Conference regular season and conference tournament champion Division regular season champion Division regular season and conference tournament champion Conference tournament champion
