= 1999 Southland Conference baseball tournament =

- Teams: 6
- Format: Double-elimination
- Finals site: Warhawk Field; Monroe, Louisiana
- Champions: Southwest Texas State (2nd title)
- Winning coach: Howard Bushong (2nd title)
- MVP: Matt Mize (Texas–Arlington)

1999 Southland Conference baseball standings
	Conf.				Overall
Team	W		L	PCT	W		L	PCT
Northeast Louisiana ‍†‍‍^{y}	19	–	7	.731	36	–	22	.621
Northwestern State ‍‍‍	18	–	9	.667	38	–	21	.644
Southwest Texas State ‍‍‡‍^{y}	15	–	12	.556	27	–	32	.458
Texas–San Antonio ‍‍‍	15	–	12	.556	27	–	33	.450
Texas–Arlington ‍‍‍	14	–	13	.519	26	–	35	.426
Southeastern Louisiana ‍‍‍	13	–	14	.481	28	–	29	.491
Lamar ‍‍‍	12	–	14	.462	34	–	21	.618
McNeese State ‍‍‍	12	–	15	.444	31	–	25	.554
Sam Houston State ‍‍‍	8	–	19	.296	22	–	33	.400
Nicholls State ‍‍‍	8	–	19	.296	20	–	32	.385
† – Conference champion ‡ – Tournament champion y – Invited to the NCAA tournament As of June 30, 1999; Rankings from Collegiate Baseball

The 1999 Southland Conference baseball tournament was held from May 16 to 19, 1999 to determine the champion of the Southland Conference in the sport of college baseball for the 1999 season. The event pitted the top six finishers from the conference's regular season in a double-elimination tournament held at Warhawk Field, home field of Northeast Louisiana in Monroe, Louisiana. Third-seeded Southwest Texas State won their second championship and claimed the automatic bid to the 1999 NCAA Division I baseball tournament.

== Seeding and format ==
The top six finishers from the regular season were seeded one through six. They played a double-elimination tournament.

Team	W	L	T	Pct	Seed
Northeast Louisiana	20	7	.741	—	1
Northwestern State	20	7	.741	—	2
Southwest Texas State	16	11	.593	4	3
UTSA	15	12	.556	5	4
Texas–Arlington	14	13	.519	6	5
Southeastern Louisiana	14	13	.519	6	6
Lamar	11	16	.407	9	—
McNeese State	10	17	.370	10	—
Sam Houston State	9	18	.333	11	—
Nicholls State	6	21	.222	14	—

== Bracket and results ==
First round
1	Northeast Louisiana	8
6	Southeastern Louisiana	4
3	Southwest Texas State	2
4	UTSA	11
2	Northwestern State	8
5	Texas–Arlington	11

Second round
1	Northeast Louisiana	4
3	Texas State	5
6	Southeastern Louisiana	11
2	Northwestern State	13
4	UTSA	3
5	Texas–Arlington	4
4	UTSA	7
1	Northeast Louisiana	4

Third round
3	Texas State	8
2	Northwestern State	4
5	Texas–Arlington	7
4	UTSA	3

Final
3	Texas State	6^{12}	9
5	Texas–Arlington	4	7

== All-Tournament Team ==
The following players were named to the All-Tournament Team.

Pos.	Name	School
P	Mike Bradley	Texas–Arlington
P	Ben Sheets	Northeast Louisiana
C	Chris Seaman	Texas State
1B	John Tompkins	Texas State
2B	Joe Kennedy	Texas–Arlington
3B	Nick Frank	Northeast Louisiana
SS	J.T. Herak	Texas–Arlington
OF	Matt Mize	Texas–Arlington
OF	Anthony Dominguez	Texas State
OF	Kent Wallis	UTSA
DH	Corey Artieta	Northeast Louisiana

=== Most Valuable Player ===
Matt Mize was named Tournament Most Valuable Player. Mize was an outfielder for Texas–Arlington.
