= 2014 Louisiana–Monroe Warhawks baseball team =

American college baseball season

2014 Louisiana–Monroe Warhawks baseball
- Conference: Sun Belt Conference
- Record: 5-6 (0–0 Sun Belt)
- Head coach: Jeff Schexnaider
- Home stadium: Warhawk Field

2014 Sun Belt Conference baseball standings
	Conf.				Overall
Team	W		L	PCT	W		L	PCT
No. 9 Louisiana–Lafayette ‍†‍‡‍^{y}	26	–	4	.867	58	–	10	.853
Texas–Arlington ‍‍‍	19	–	11	.633	32	–	26	.552
Arkansas State ‍‍‍	18	–	12	.600	32	–	26	.552
Texas State ‍‍‍	16	–	14	.533	30	–	28	.517
WKU ‍‍‍	15	–	15	.500	29	–	28	.509
Troy ‍‍‍	11	–	18	.379	25	–	32	.439
South Alabama ‍‍‍	11	–	18	.379	22	–	33	.400
Arkansas–Little Rock ‍‍‍	11	–	19	.367	25	–	29	.463
Georgia State ‍‍‍	11	–	19	.367	25	–	31	.446
Louisiana–Monroe ‍‍‍	11	–	19	.367	23	–	36	.390
† – Conference champion ‡ – Tournament champion y – Invited to the NCAA tournament As of June 30, 2014; Rankings from Collegiate Baseball

The 2014 Louisiana–Monroe Warhawks baseball team represented the University of Louisiana at Monroe in the 2014 NCAA Division I baseball season. The Warhawks played their home games in Warhawk Field.

== Personnel ==
=== Returning starters ===
Player	Class	Position
Austen Smith	Senior	1B
Kyle Overstreet	Sophomore	2B
Mikey White	Sophomore	SS
Georgie Salem	Sophomore	CF
Ben Moore	Sophomore	RF
Taylor Guilbeau	Junior	SP
Tucker Hawely	Senior	SP
Justin Kamplain	Junior	SP
Ray Castillo	Sophomore	Closer

=== Roster ===
2013 Louisiana–Monroe Warhawks baseball roster
Pitchers: 8 Christo Jones - Junior; 10 Logan Dopson - Junior; 13 Cale Wine - RsSenior; 16 Alex Hermeling - Sophomore; 20 Tyler Bray - Junior; 23 Cody Connalley - RsFreshman; 25 Alex Dumaine - Junior; 27 Josh Lenone - Freshman; 28 Ryan Bergeron - Sophomore; 29 Shelby Audls - Senior; 30 Andrew Richardson - RsSenior; 32 Carey Taylor - Junior; 33 Chet Simoneaux - RsJunior; 36 Devin Malone - Senior; 38 Jared Dye - Junior; 40 Chad Miller - Junior; 44 Trey Setzer - Junior	Catchers: 9 Logan Fiasco - Senior; 11 Dalton Todd - Freshman; 37 Blake Wolfe - RsFreshman	Infielders: 1 Trent Lucus - Senior; 2 Josh Faciane - RsFreshman; 5 Koddie Tidwell - Freshman; 7 Jeff Fuller - Junior; 12 Tanner Hebert - Freshman; 14 Judd Edwards - Senior; 21 Corben Green - RsSenior	Outfielders: 1 Raph Rhymes - Senior; 2 Chris Sciambra - Sophomore; 5 Andrew Stevenson - Freshman; 7 Sean McMullen - Junior; 9 Mark Laird - Freshman; 13 Alex Edward - Senior

== Schedule and results ==
2014 Louisiana-Monroe Warhawks baseball game log
Regular season

February (4–6)
Date	Opponent	Site/stadium	Score	Win	Loss	Save	Attendance	Overall record	Sun Belt record
February 14	Grand Canyon	Warhawk Field	6-3	C. Miller (1–0)	J. Perez (0-1)	T. Bray (1)	877	1-0	–
February 15	Grand Canyon	Warhawk Field	5-4	A. Dumaine (1-0)	A. Naderer (0-1)	None	864	2-0	–
February 16	Grand Canyon	Warhawk Field	1-7	C. Bruns (1-0)	T. High (0-1)	None	764	2–1	–
February 18	Southern Miss	Warhawk Field	2-14	Glasshof (1-0	J. Leone (1-1)	None	1,003	2-2	-
Carmel Inn Showdown Presented by the Sports Medicine Center of Thibodaux Regional
February 20	vs. Western Illinois	Ray E. Didier Field	6-2	C. Miller (1-0)	Michel (0-1)	C. Taylor (1)	130	3-2	-
February 21	vs. Nicholls State	Ray E. Didier Field	3-0	T. Byrd (1-1)	A. Dumaine (1-1)	M. Piccola (2)	366	3-3	-
February 22	vs. Western Illinois	Ray E. Didier Field	6-5 (11)	T. Bray (1-0)	Smith (0-1)	None	171	4-3	-
February 23	vs. Southern Illinois	Ray E. Didier Field	Canceled	-	-	-	-	4-3	-
February 25	@ #24 Ole Miss	Swayze Field	4-5	W. Short (1-0)	T. Bray (1-1)	None	6,089	4-4	-
February 26	@ #24 Ole Miss	Swayze Field	3-4	C. Bickle (1-1)	C. Taylor (0-1)	None	5,657	4-5	-
February 28	Southeastern Louisiana	Warhawk Field	3-14	A. Cutura (2-0)	A. Dumaine (1-2)	None	830	4-6	-

March (7–11)
Date	Opponent	Site/stadium	Score	Win	Loss	Save	Attendance	Overall record	Sun Belt record
March 1	Southeastern Louisiana	Warhawk Field	6-5	C. Miller (2-0)	D. Hills (0-1)	None	829	5-6	-
March 2	Southeastern Louisiana	Warhawk Field	3-2	C. Taylor (1-1)	J. Gremillion (0-1)	None	782	6-6	-
March 5	Michigan State	Warhawk Field	5-1	C. Hunt (1-0)	M. Theodore (0-1)	None	800	7-6	-
March 7	@ Samford	Joe Lee Griffin Stadium	3-9	Ledford (3-0)	J. Leone (1-2)	None	234	7-8	-
March 8	@ Samford	Joe Lee Griffin Stadium	6-9	Milazzo (2-0)	A. Hermeling (0-1)	None	1,217	7-9	-
March 9	@ Samford	Joe Lee Griffin Stadium	5-6 (10)	Donham (1-0)	T. Bray (1-2)	None	453	7-10	-
March 11	Jackson State	Warhawk Field	6-9					7-11	-
March 12	@ Jackson State	Braddy Field	2-5					7-12	-
March 14	Louisiana-Lafayette	Warhawk Field	1-4					7-13	0-1
March 15	Louisiana-Lafayette	Warahawk Field	1-14					7-14	0-2
March 16	Louisiana-Lafayette	Warhawk Field	2-21 (7)					7-15	0-3
March 18	@ Southern Miss	Pete Taylor Park	2-18					7-16	0-3
March 21	@ Troy	Riddle-Pace Field	7-4					8-16	1-3
March 22	@ Troy	Riddle-Pace Field	3-4					8-17	1-4
March 23	@ Troy	Riddle-Pace Field	3-19					8-18	1-5
March 28	Arkansas-Little Rock	Warhawk Field	6-4					9-18	2-5
March 29	Arkansas-Little Rock	Warhawk Field	11-10 (11)					10-18	3-5
March 30	Arkansas-Little Rock	Warhawk Field	16-5 (7)					11-18	4-5

April
Date	Opponent	Site/stadium	Score	Win	Loss	Save	Attendance	Overall record	Sun Belt record
April 1	@ Alabama	Sewell-Thomas Stadium							
April 2	Nicholls State	Warhawk Field							
April 4	@ UT-Arlington	Clay Gould Ballpark							
April 5	@ UT-Arlington	Clay Gould Ballpark							
April 6	@ UT-Arlington	Clay Gould Ballpark							
April 8	Northwestern State	Warhawk Field							
April 9	FIU	Warhawk Field							
April 11	Texas State	Warhawk Field							
April 12	Texas State	Warhawk Field							
April 13	Texas State	Warhawk Field							
April 15	@ Northwestern State	C. C. Stroud Field							
April 18	@ Arkansas State	Kell Field							
April 19	@ Arkansas State	Kell Field							
April 20	@ Arkansas State	Kell Field							
April 23	Grambling State	Warhawk Field							
April 25	@ South Alabama	Eddie Stanky Field							
April 26	@ South Alabama	Eddie Stanky Field							
April 27	@ South Alabama	Eddie Stanky Field							

May
Date	Opponent	Site/stadium	Score	Win	Loss	Save	Attendance	Overall record	Sun Belt record
May 2	Western Kentucky	Warhawk Field							
May 3	Western Kentucky	Warhawk Field							
May 4	Western Kentucky	Warhawk Field							
May 9	Georgia State	Warahawk Field							
May 10	Georgia State	Warhawk Field							
May 11	Georgia State	Warhawk Field							
May 15	@ Louisiana-Lafayette	M.L. Tigue Moore Field							
May 16	@ Louisiana-Lafayette	M.L. Tigue Moore Field							
May 17	@ Louisiana-Lafayette	M.L. Tigue Moore Field		KLAF / ESPN3					

== Rankings ==
Ranking movements Legend: — = Not ranked
	Week																			
Poll	Pre	1	2	3	4	5	6	7	8	9	10	11	12	13	14	15	16	17	18	Final
Coaches'	—	—*																		
Baseball America	—																			
Collegiate Baseball^	—																			
NCBWA†	—																			

^ Collegiate Baseball ranked 40 teams in their preseason poll, but only ranked 30 teams weekly during the season.
† NCBWA ranks 30 teams in their preseason poll, but only ranks 25 teams weekly during the season.
* A new poll was not released for this week, so for comparison purposes, the previous week's ranking is inserted in this week's slot.
