= Ty Harrington =

American baseball coach (born 1964)

Biographical details
- Born: July 16, 1964 (age 62); Pasadena, Texas, U.S.

Playing career
- 1986–1987: Texas
- Position: Infielder

Coaching career (HC unless noted)
- 1988–1991: Texas (asst.)
- 1991–1994: Arkansas State (asst.)
- 1995–1998: Northeast Texas CC
- 1999: Blinn
- 2000–2019: Texas State

Head coaching record
- Overall: 164–75 (.686) (junior college); 657–516–2 (.560) (college)
- Tournaments: 2–6 (NCAA)

Accomplishments and honors

Championships
- 2× Southland tournament (2000, 2011); 3× Southland regular season (2009, 2010, 2011); Sun Belt West Division (2019)

Awards
- 2× Southland Coach of the Year (2009, 2011); Sun Belt Coach of the Year (2019)

Ty Lee Harrington (born July 16, 1964) is an American former baseball player and coach. He served as the head baseball coach at Texas State University from 2000 through the 2019 season. Under Harrington, the Texas State Bobcats to three NCAA tournament appearances, two Southland Conference baseball tournament championships, and three Southland Conference baseball regular season championships. Harrington is the most victorious coach in program history.

== Early life and education ==
Ty Lee Harrington was born in Pasadena, Texas, where his parents Lee Pickens Harrington and Elaine Cezeaux Harrington were teachers in the local school district. The family later moved to Waco, Texas, when Lee became an assistant coach at Baylor. Ty Harrington graduated from Midway High School in Waco in 1983.

Harrington attended the University of Texas at Austin, where he lettered with Texas Longhorns baseball in 1986 and 1987 as an infielder under head coach Cliff Gustafson. Harrington was a team captain as a senior on the 1987 team that made the College World Series.

== Coaching career ==
=== Early career (1988–1999) ===
From 1988 to 1991, Harrington was a student assistant and later graduate assistant coach at Texas. From 1992 to 1994, Harrington was an assistant coach at Arkansas State. During his tenure, the team established many school records, and the 1994 team won the Sun Belt Conference baseball tournament and appeared in the NCAA tournament.

He then served as head coach at a pair of Texas junior colleges, the first of which was Northeast Texas Community College from 1995 to 1998, where he claimed the 1996 NJCAA championship and Coach of the Year awards. Harrington went 128–53 at Northeast Texas. Harrington then coached at Blinn College in 1999, going 36–22 in his lone season.

=== Southwest Texas State/Texas State (2000–2019) ===
On December 9, 1999, Harrington became head coach at Texas State (then Southwest Texas State) University. Harrington was hired after previous head coach Howard Bushong resigned to coach with the San Diego Padres organization.

In his debut season in 2000, Harrington went 34–29 with an NCAA tournament appearance at Southwest Texas State. Harrington would go on six straight winning seasons through 2005. On April 27, 2005, Texas State upset no. 1 Texas 2–1 in 10 innings at Disch–Falk Field, Texas's home field. Having been a member of the Southland Conference until the 2012 season, Texas State changed conferences twice, first to the Western Athletic Conference in 2013 then the Sun Belt Conference from 2014 on.

On April 23, 2011, he claimed his 400th career win over Northwestern State. During the 2012 season, Harrington led the team to their highest ever national ranking, at number 20 in the Baseball America poll on March 12. He has also developed three All-Americans, and numerous conference players of the year.

On June 20, 2019, Harrington retired from coaching baseball. In 20 seasons as Texas State head coach from 2000 to 2019, Harrington accumulated a 657–516–2 record. Under Harrington, Texas State appeared in three NCAA tournaments in 2000, 2009, and 2011 and won four conference titles, with three straight Southland regular season titles from 2009 to 2011 and the Sun Belt West Division title in 2019. Harrington was the Southland Coach of the Year in 2009 and 2011 and Sun Belt Coach of the Year in 2019.

== Post-coaching career ==
After retiring from baseball coaching, Harrington joined the investor relations team at San Antonio-based real estate development firm Casey Development.

== Personal life ==
Harrington is married to Leila Baggett and has two children with her. He also has a child from his previous marriage to Lori Groves.

== Head coaching record ==
The following section lists Harrington's year-by-year record as an NCAA Division I head coach.

Record table
Season	Team	Overall	Conference	Standing	Postseason
Southwest Texas State/Texas State Bobcats (Southland Conference) (2000–2012)
2000	Southwest Texas State	34–29	16–11	3rd	NCAA Regional
2001	Southwest Texas State	36–22	15–11	T–3rd	
2002	Southwest Texas State	36–24	14–13	6th	
2003	Southwest Texas State	30–28	19–7	2nd	
2004	Texas State	32–26	16–10	3rd	
2005	Texas State	32–26	15–12	3rd	
2006	Texas State	29–30	20–10	T–2nd	
2007	Texas State	37–23	20–10	2nd (West)	
2008	Texas State	30–27	19–11	2nd (West)	
2009	Texas State	41–17	24–7	1st	NCAA Regional
2010	Texas State	38–22	23–10	1st	
2011	Texas State	41–23	24–9	1st	NCAA Regional
2012	Texas State	32–24	19–14	T–3rd	
Texas State Bobcats (Western Athletic Conference) (2013)
2013	Texas State	29–29	16–11	3rd	
Texas State Bobcats (Sun Belt Conference) (2014–2019)
2014	Texas State	30–28	16–14	4th	
2015	Texas State	24–30–1	14–16	T–6th	
2016	Texas State	31–28	16–14	T–5th	
2017	Texas State	29–30	13–17	4th (West)	
2018	Texas State	30–28–1	16–14	2nd (West)	
2019	Texas State	36–20	20–10	1st (West)	
Texas State:		657–516–2 (.560)	355–231 (.606)		
Total:		657–516–2 (.560)			
National champion Postseason invitational champion Conference regular season champion Conference regular season and conference tournament champion Division regular season champion Division regular season and conference tournament champion Conference tournament champion
