= Steven Trout =

American college baseball coach

Current position
- Title: Head coach
- Team: Texas State
- Conference: Pac-12
- Record: 209–162

Biographical details
- Born: October 4, 1984 (age 41)

Playing career
- 2004–2005: Texarkana
- 2006–2007: TCU
- 2007: Macon Music
- 2007: Fort Worth Cats
- 2008: Kansas City T-Bones
- Position: Infielder

Coaching career (HC unless noted)
- 2009–2010: Texas State (assistant)
- 2011: Houston (assistant)
- 2012: Texarkana
- 2013–2015: West Virginia (assistant)
- 2016–2019: Texas State (assistant)
- 2020–present: Texas State

Head coaching record
- Overall: 209–162 (NCAA); 38–11 (NJCAA)
- Tournaments: Sun Belt: 2–5, NCAA: 3–3

Accomplishments and honors

Championships
- Southwest Junior College Conference (2012); Sun Belt Conference (2022)

Steven L. Trout (born October 4, 1984) is an American college baseball coach and former infielder. He is the head baseball coach of Texas State University. Trout played college baseball at Texarkana College from 2004 to 2005 before transferring to Texas Christian University where he played for coach Jim Schlossnagle in 2006 and 2007.

== Playing career ==
Trout attended Hooks High School in Hooks, Texas. Trout played for the school's varsity baseball, football, basketball and golf. Trout then enrolled at Texarkana College, to play college baseball for the Texarkana Bulldogs team.

As a freshman at Texarkana College in 2004, Trout had a .312 batting average, 8 home runs, and 25 RBIs.

As a sophomore in 2005, Trout batted .353 with four home runs.

In the 2006 season as a junior, Trout hit .286 with 2 home runs and 33 RBIs.

Trout had his best season as a senior in 2007, hitting a career high in doubles (18), home runs (4), RBIs (44), batting average (.326) and slugging (.455). He was named 2nd team All-Mountain West Conference.

Trout then played half a season each for the Macon Music, Fort Worth Cats, and the Kansas City T-Bones.

== Coaching career ==
In 2009, Trout was named a volunteer assistant for the Texas State Bobcats baseball program. In August 2010, Trout was named a volunteer assistant for the Houston Cougars baseball team. Trout became the head baseball coach at Texarkana College in the fall of 2011, replacing Will Bolt, and was the head coach for the 2012 season. On June 14, 2012, Trout was named the hitting coach of the West Virginia Mountaineers baseball team. Trout returned to the Texas State staff as a paid assistant in the fall of 2015.

On July 1, 2019, Trout was named the head coach of Texas State. After a record-setting 2022 season in which Texas State set a program record with 47 wins, won the Sun Belt regular season championship, and reached the finals of the Stanford Regional, Trout signed a 5-year extension through the 2027 season.

== Head coaching record ==
Record table
Season	Team	Overall	Conference	Standing	Postseason
Texarkana Bulldogs (Southwest Junior College Conference) (2012)
2012	Texarkana	38–11		1st	Region XIV Tournament
Texarkana (NJCAA):		38–11			
Texas State Bobcats (Sun Belt Conference) (2020–present)
2020	Texas State	14–4	0–0	N/A (West)	Season canceled due to COVID-19
2021	Texas State	21–36	9–15	6th (West)	Sun Belt tournament
2022	Texas State	47–14	26–4	1st	NCAA Regional
2023	Texas State	36–23	17–13	5th	Sun Belt tournament
2024	Texas State	27–29	13–17	5th (West)	
2025	Texas State	27–31	14–16	T–7th	Sun Belt tournament
2026	Texas State	37–24	16–14	T–6th	NCAA Regional
Texas State:		209–162	95–79		
Total:		247–173			
National champion Postseason invitational champion Conference regular season champion Conference regular season and conference tournament champion Division regular season champion Division regular season and conference tournament champion Conference tournament champion

== See also ==
- List of current NCAA Division I baseball coaches
