= 1997 Colonial Athletic Association baseball tournament =

American college baseball tournament

- Teams: 8
- Format: Double-elimination tournament
- Finals site: Grainger Stadium; Kinston, North Carolina
- Champions: Richmond (2nd title)
- Winning coach: Ron Atkins (2nd title)
- MVP: John Wagler (Richmond)

1997 Colonial Athletic Association baseball standings
	Conf.				Overall
Team	W		L	PCT	W		L	PCT
VCU ‍†‍‍	15	–	4	.789	32	–	23	.582
Old Dominion ‍‍‍	12	–	8	.600	34	–	20	.630
James Madison ‍‍‍	10	–	10	.500	31	–	26	.544
George Mason ‍‍‍	10	–	11	.476	29	–	24	.547
East Carolina ‍‍‍	10	–	11	.476	29	–	27	.518
William & Mary ‍‍‍	8	–	12	.400	30	–	24	.556
Richmond ‍‍‡‍^{y}	8	–	12	.400	34	–	26	.567
UNC Wilmington ‍‍‍	7	–	12	.368	28	–	29	.491
† – Conference champion ‡ – Tournament champion y – Invited to the NCAA tournament As of June 30, 1997; Rankings from Collegiate Baseball

The 1997 Colonial Athletic Association baseball tournament was held at Grainger Stadium in Kinston, North Carolina, from May 14 through 18. The event determined the champion of the Colonial Athletic Association for the 1997 season. Seventh-seeded Richmond won the tournament for the second time and earned the CAA's automatic bid to the 1997 NCAA Division I baseball tournament.

Entering the event, East Carolina had won the most championships, with five. Old Dominion had won three, George Mason had won two, while Richmond had won once.

== Format and seeding ==
The CAA's teams were seeded one to eight based on winning percentage from the conference's round robin regular season. They played a double-elimination tournament.

Team	W	L	Pct.	GB	Seed
VCU	15	4	.789	—	1
Old Dominion	12	8	.600	3.5	2
James Madison	10	10	.500	5.5	3
George Mason	10	11	.476	6	4
East Carolina	10	11	.476	6	5
William & Mary	8	12	.400	7.5	6
Richmond	8	12	.400	7.5	7
UNC Wilmington	7	12	.368	8	8

== Bracket and results ==
Upper round 1	Upper round 2	Upper final	Final
1	VCU	10
8	UNC Wilmington	11
8	UNC Wilmington	8
5	East Carolina	9^{12}
4	George Mason	5
5	East Carolina	7
5	East Carolina	3
7	Richmond	6
3	James Madison	8
6	William & Mary	2
3	James Madison	0
7	Richmond	14
2	Old Dominion	5
7	Richmond	8	7	Richmond	9
5	East Carolina	8	—
Lower round 1	Lower round 2	Lower round 3	Lower final
3	James Madison	2
1	VCU	15	1	VCU	4	5	East Carolina	3^{10}
4	George Mason	8	1	VCU	6	6	William & Mary	2
6	William & Mary	9
8	UNC Wilmington	0
6	William & Mary	8	6	William & Mary	12
2	Old Dominion	5

== Most Valuable Player ==
John Wagler was named Tournament Most Valuable Player. Wagler was an outfielder for Richmond.
