= 2014 Georgia State Panthers baseball team =

Baseball Team

2014 Georgia State Panthers baseball
- Conference: Sun Belt Conference
- Record: 25-31 (11-19 SBC)
- Head coach: Greg Frady (7th season)
- Home stadium: GSU Baseball Complex

2014 Sun Belt Conference baseball standings
	Conf.				Overall
Team	W		L	PCT	W		L	PCT
No. 9 Louisiana–Lafayette ‍†‍‡‍^{y}	26	–	4	.867	58	–	10	.853
Texas–Arlington ‍‍‍	19	–	11	.633	32	–	26	.552
Arkansas State ‍‍‍	18	–	12	.600	32	–	26	.552
Texas State ‍‍‍	16	–	14	.533	30	–	28	.517
WKU ‍‍‍	15	–	15	.500	29	–	28	.509
Troy ‍‍‍	11	–	18	.379	25	–	32	.439
South Alabama ‍‍‍	11	–	18	.379	22	–	33	.400
Arkansas–Little Rock ‍‍‍	11	–	19	.367	25	–	29	.463
Georgia State ‍‍‍	11	–	19	.367	25	–	31	.446
Louisiana–Monroe ‍‍‍	11	–	19	.367	23	–	36	.390
† – Conference champion ‡ – Tournament champion y – Invited to the NCAA tournament As of June 30, 2014; Rankings from Collegiate Baseball

The 2014 Georgia State Panthers baseball team represented Georgia State University in the 2014 NCAA Division I baseball season. The Panthers played their home games at the GSU Baseball Complex. 2014 represents the first year of GSU playing back in the Sun Belt Conference. The Panthers finished the season with a 25-31, going 11-19 in the Sun Belt Conference, going 19-14 at home vs 6-17 away. The Panthers finished 9th in the Sun Belt.

== Personnel ==
=== 2014 Roster ===
2014 Georgia State Panthers roster
Pitchers: 1 David Mayo - Freshman; 3 Andrew Fessler - Senior; 5 Matt Rose - Sophomore; 6 Michael Lelko - Sophomore; 11 Aiden McLaughlin - (redshirt) Senior; 12 Tyler McClure - Junior; 13 Garrett Ford - Sophomore; 17 Jerry Stuckey - Junior; 18 Conner Stanley - Junior; 20 Nathan Bates - Sophomore; 21 Ben Burns - Senior; 24 Kenny Anderson - Junior; 26 Wayne Wages - Sophomore; 27 Austin Parrish - Freshman; 29 Alex Prescott - Junior; 31 Kevin Burgee - Junior; 35 Hunter Cash - (redshirt) Senior; 47 Sean Wilson - Freshman	Catchers: 8 Joey Roach - Sophomore; 14 Trae Sweeting - Freshman; 19 Zach Moon - Freshman; Infielders: 7 Caden Bailey - Junior; 9 Chad Prain - Senior; 15 David Levy - Junior; 22 Nic Wilson - Senior	Outfielders: 2 Chris Triplett - Senior; 4 James Clements - Junior; 16 Ryan Blanton - Freshman; 23 Josh Merrigan - Freshman; 32 Chase Raffield - (redshirt) Senior

=== Coaching staff ===
2014 Georgia State Panthers baseball coaching staff
- 10 Greg Frady – Head coach - 7th year
- 48 Edwin Thompson – Assistant coach - 2nd year
- 25 Willie Stewart – Assistant coach - 3rd year

== Schedule ==
2014 Georgia State Panthers baseball game log
Regular season
February

#	Date	Opponent	Venue	Score	Overall record	SBC record
1	February 14	Illinois	GSU Baseball Complex	5-4	1-0	-
2	February 15	Illinois	GSU Baseball Complex	13-19	1-1	-
3	February 16	Illinois	GSU Baseball Complex	10-6	2-1	-
4	February 18	Savannah State	Savannah, GA	7-6	3-1	-
5	February 21	Ole Miss	Oxford, MS	0-3	3-2	-
6	February 22	Ole Miss	Oxford, MS	1-9	3-3	-
7	February 23	Ole Miss	Oxford, MS	6-4	4-3	-
8	February 26	Georgia	Athens, GA	3-2	5-3	-
9	February 28	Northern Kentucky	GSU Baseball Complex	5-6	5-4	-

March

#	Date	Opponent	Venue	Score	Overall record	SBC record
10	March 1	Northern Kentucky	GSU Sports Arena	3-4	5-5	-
11	March 2	Northern Kentucky	GSU Sports Arena	13-2	6-5	-
12	March 4	Kennesaw State	Kennesaw, GA	0-3	6-6	-
13	March 7	Xavier	GSU Baseball Complex	1-16	6-7	-
14	March 8	Xavier	GSU Baseball Complex	10-11	6-8	-
15	March 9	Xavier	GSU Baseball Complex	7-6	7-8	-
16	March 11	Siena	GSU Baseball Complex	15-9	8-8	-
17	March 12	Siena	GSU Baseball Complex	19-5	9-8	-
18	March 14	Western Kentucky	GSU Baseball Complex	6-5	10-8	1-0
19	March 15	Western Kentucky	GSU Baseball Complex	3-4	10-9	1-1
20	March 15	Western Kentucky	GSU Baseball Complex	5-6	10-10	1-2
21	March 19	Georgia Tech	GSU Baseball Complex	4-9	10-11	1-2
22	March 21	#5 Louisiana–Lafayette	Lafayette, LA	3-8	10-11	1-3
23	March 22	Louisiana–Lafayette	Lafayette, LA	6-14	10-13	1-4
24	March 23	Louisiana–Lafayette	Lafayette, LA	3-5	10-14	1-5
25	March 25	Alabama A&M	GSU Baseball Complex	19-3	11-14	1-5
26	March 26	Alabama A&M	GSU Baseball Complex	19-6	12-14	1-5
27	March 28	Troy	GSU Baseball Complex	8-6	13-14	2-5
28	March 29	Troy	GSU Baseball Complex	6-3	14-14	3-5
29	March 30	Troy	GSU Baseball Complex	9-13	14-15	3-6

April

#	Date	Opponent	Venue	Score	Overall record	SBC record
30	April 2	Georgia Tech	Atlanta, GA	3-7	14-16	3-6
31	April 4	Arkansas–Little Rock	Little Rock, AR	7-14	14-17	3-7
32	April 5	Arkansas–Little Rock	Little Rock, AR	3-2	15-17	4-7
33	April 6	Arkansas–Little Rock	Little Rock, AR	2-9	15-18	4-8
34	April 9	Mercer	GSU Baseball Complex	8-7	16-18	4-8
35	April 11	Texas–Arlington	GSU Baseball Complex	11-10	17-18	5-8
36	April 12	Texas–Arlington	GSU Baseball Complex	3-6	17-19	5-9
37	April 13	Texas–Arlington	GSU Baseball Complex	4-6	17-20	5-10
-	April 15	Kennesaw State	GSU Baseball Complex	Cancelled	-	-
38	April 18	Texas State	San Marcos, TX	1-8	17-21	5-11
39	April 19	Texas State	San Marcos	2-4	17-22	5-12
40	April 20	Texas State	San Marcos	1-4	17-23	5-13
41	April 22	Oglethorpe	GSU Baseball Complex	18-2	18-23	5-13
42	April 23	Savannah State	GSU Baseball Complex	12-6	19-23	5-13
43	April 25	Arkansas State	GSU Baseball Complex	5-1	20-23	6-13
44	April 26	Arkansas State	GSU Baseball Complex	7-6	21-23	7-13
45	April 27	Arkansas State	GSU Baseball Complex	6-10	21-24	7-14

May

#	Date	Opponent	Venue	Score	Overall record	SBC record
46	May 2	South Alabama	GSU Baseball Complex	1-8	21-25	7-15
47	May 3	South Alabama	GSU Baseball Complex	7-4	22-25	8-15
48	May 4	South Alabama	GSU Baseball Complex	15-10	23-25	9-15
49	May 7	Kennesaw State	GSU Baseball Complex	6-11	23-26	9-15
50	May 9	Louisiana–Monroe	Monroe, LA	6-5	24-26	10-15
51	May 10	Louisiana–Monroe	Monroe, LA	6-10	24-27	10-16
52	May 11	Louisiana–Monroe	Monroe, LA	1-11	24-28	10-17
53	May 13	Mercer	Macon, GA	5-6	24-29	10-17
54	May 15	Western Kentucky	Bowling Green, KY	1-10	24-30	10-18
55	May 16	Western Kentucky	Bowling Green, KY	1-2	24-31	10-19
56	May 17	Western Kentucky	Bowling Green, KY	5-4	25-31	11-19

Postseason
SBC Baseball Tournament

#	Date	Opponent	Site/stadium	Score	Overall record	SBC record	SBC Tournament record
57	NA	Did not qualify	Mobile, AL	-	-	-	-
