= 2014 Sun Belt Conference baseball tournament =

- 2014 Sun Belt Conference Baseball Tournament
- Teams: 8
- Format: Double-elimination
- Finals site: Eddie Stanky Field; Mobile, AL
- Champions: Louisiana–Lafayette (2nd title)
- Winning coach: Tony Robichaux (2nd title)
- MVP: Blake Trahan (Louisiana–Lafayette)
- Television: Sun Belt Network

2014 Sun Belt Conference baseball standings
	Conf.				Overall
Team	W		L	PCT	W		L	PCT
No. 9 Louisiana–Lafayette ‍†‍‡‍^{y}	26	–	4	.867	58	–	10	.853
Texas–Arlington ‍‍‍	19	–	11	.633	32	–	26	.552
Arkansas State ‍‍‍	18	–	12	.600	32	–	26	.552
Texas State ‍‍‍	16	–	14	.533	30	–	28	.517
WKU ‍‍‍	15	–	15	.500	29	–	28	.509
Troy ‍‍‍	11	–	18	.379	25	–	32	.439
South Alabama ‍‍‍	11	–	18	.379	22	–	33	.400
Arkansas–Little Rock ‍‍‍	11	–	19	.367	25	–	29	.463
Georgia State ‍‍‍	11	–	19	.367	25	–	31	.446
Louisiana–Monroe ‍‍‍	11	–	19	.367	23	–	36	.390
† – Conference champion ‡ – Tournament champion y – Invited to the NCAA tournament As of June 30, 2014; Rankings from Collegiate Baseball

The 2014 Sun Belt Conference baseball tournament was held at Eddie Stanky Field on the campus of the University of South Alabama in Mobile, Alabama from May 21 to May 25, 2014. The tournament used a double-elimination format. Louisiana–Lafayette won the tournament, earning the Sun Belt Conference's automatic bid to the 2014 NCAA Division I baseball tournament. The league was expected to divide into two six team divisions for 2014, but due to the departures of three baseball playing schools the plan was shelved, possibly to be implemented in 2015 with the additions of Appalachian State and Georgia Southern.

== Seeding ==
The top eight teams (based on conference results) from the conference earned invites to the tournament. The teams were seeded based on conference winning percentage, and then played a two bracket, double-elimination tournament. The winner of each bracket played a championship final.

Team	W	L	Pct	GB	Seed
Louisiana–Lafayette	26	4	.867	–	1
Texas–Arlington	19	11	.633	7	2
Arkansas State	18	12	.600	8	3
Texas State	16	14	.533	10	4
WKU	15	15	.500	11	5
Troy	11	18	.379	14.5	6
South Alabama	11	18	.379	14.5	7
Louisiana–Monroe	11	19	.367	15	8
Arkansas–Little Rock	11	19	.367	15	–
Georgia State	11	19	.367	15	–

== Results ==
First round
5	WKU	3
4	Texas State	4^{10}
8	Louisiana–Monroe	3
1	Louisiana–Lafayette	7
5	Western Kentucky	6
8	Louisiana–Monroe	8
6	Troy	4
3	Arkansas State	3^{13}
2	Texas–Arlington	8
7	South Alabama	4
3	Arkansas State	4
7	South Alabama	3

Second round
4	Texas State	4
1	Louisiana–Lafayette	11
4	Texas State	4
8	Louisiana–Monroe	2
2	Texas–Arlington	7
6	Troy	3
6	Troy	0
3	Arkansas State	12

Semifinals
1	Louisiana–Lafayette	4	–
4	Texas State	3	–
2	Texas–Arlington	8	–
3	Arkansas State	7	–

Final
1	Louisiana–Lafayette	6
2	Texas–Arlington	5

== All-Tournament Team ==
The following players were named to the All-Tournament Team. Louisiana–Lafayette's Blake Trahan, one of four Ragin' Cajuns selected, was named Most Outstanding Player.

Name	Team
Ross Moore	Louisiana–Monroe
David Hall	Troy
Austin O'Neal	Texas State
Austin Williams	Texas State
Zach Maggio	Arkansas State
Chandler Hawkins	Arkansas State
Travis Sibley	UT Arlington
Zach Thompson	UT Arlington
Darien McLemore	UT Arlington
Matt Shortall	UT Arlington
Jace Conrad	Louisiana–Lafayette
Matt Plitt	Louisiana–Lafayette
Caleb Adams	Louisiana–Lafayette
Blake Trahan	Louisiana–Lafayette
