= 1997 Mid-Continent Conference baseball tournament =

- Teams: 4
- Format: Double-elimination
- Finals site: Les Miller Field; Chicago, Illinois
- Champions: Troy State (2nd title)
- Winning coach: John Mayotte (2nd title)
- MVP: Bryan Kelly (Troy State)

1997 Mid-Continent Conference baseball standings
| | Conf. | | | | Overall |
| Team | W | | L | PCT | W | | L | PCT |
|---|---|---|---|---|---|---|---|---|
East
| Troy State ^{x}‍‍‡‍^{y} | 8 | – | 6 | .571 | 36 | – | 24 | .600 |
| C.W. Post ‍‍‍ | 8 | – | 7 | .533 | 21 | – | 24 | .467 |
| NYIT ‍‍‍ | 9 | – | 8 | .529 | 21 | – | 25 | .457 |
| Pace ‍‍‍ | 6 | – | 6 | .500 | 19 | – | 18 | .514 |
| Central Connecticut ‍‍‍ | 7 | – | 8 | .467 | 20 | – | 16 | .556 |
| Youngstown State ‍‍‍ | 8 | – | 11 | .421 | 29 | – | 21 | .580 |
West
| Northeastern Illinois ^{x}‍‍‍ | 16 | – | 7 | .696 | 29 | – | 29 | .500 |
| Western Illinois ‍‍‍ | 10 | – | 9 | .526 | 13 | – | 24 | .351 |
| Chicago State ‍‍‍ | 10 | – | 12 | .455 | 14 | – | 35 | .286 |
| Valparaiso ‍‍‍ | 6 | – | 24 | .200 | 20 | – | 31 | .392 |
‡ – Tournament champion y – Invited to the NCAA tournament As of June 30, 1997; Rankings from Collegiate Baseball

The 1997 Mid-Continent Conference Tournament took place from May 9 through 11. The top two regular season finishers of each of the league's two divisions met in the double-elimination tournament hosted by league member Northeastern Illinois in Chicago, Illinois. Troy State won the tournament for the second time.

== Format and seeding ==
The top two teams from each division advanced to the tournament.

East Division
| Team | W | L | Pct. | GB | Seed |
|---|---|---|---|---|---|
| Troy State | 8 | 6 | .571 | — | 1E |
| C.W. Post | 8 | 7 | .533 | .5 | 2E |
| NYIT | 9 | 8 | .529 | .5 | — |
| Pace | 6 | 6 | .500 | 1 | — |
| Central Connecticut | 7 | 8 | .467 | 1.5 | — |
| Youngstown State | 8 | 11 | .421 | 2.5 | — |

West Division
| Team | W | L | Pct. | GB | Seed |
|---|---|---|---|---|---|
| Northeastern Illinois | 16 | 7 | .696 | — | 1W |
| Western Illinois | 10 | 9 | .526 | 4 | 2W |
| Chicago State | 10 | 12 | .455 | 5.5 | — |
| Valparaiso | 6 | 24 | .200 | 13.5 | — |

== Tournament ==
Upper round 1
1E | Troy State | 15
2W | Western Illinois | 3
1W | Northeastern Illinois | 12
2E | C.W. Post | 3
Lower round 1
2W | Western Illinois | 6
2E | C.W. Post | 7

Upper final
1E | Troy State | 5
1W | Northeastern Illinois | 2
Lower final
1W | Northeastern Illinois | 7
2E | C.W. Post | 3

Final
1E | Troy State | 9
1W | Northeastern Illinois | 3

=== Game-by-game results ===
| Game | Winner | Score | Loser | Comment |
|---|---|---|---|---|
| 1 | (1E) Troy State | 15–3 | (2W) Western Illinois | |
| 2 | (1W) Northeastern Illinois | 12–3 | (2E) C.W. Post | |
| 3 | (2E) C.W. Post | 7–6 | (2W) Western Illinois | Western Illinois eliminated |
| 4 | (1E) Troy State | 5–2 | (1W) Northeastern Illinois | |
| 5 | (1W) Northeastern Illinois | 7–3 | (2E) C.W. Post | C.W. Post eliminated |
| 6 | (1E) Troy State | 9–3(1W) Northeastern Illinois | Troy State wins Mid-Con Championship | |

== All-Tournament Team ==
| Name | School |
|---|---|
| Tom Blake | C.W. Post |
| Rhodney Donaldson | Troy |
| Dan Eide | Troy |
| John Fodrowski | C.W. Post |
| Brian Hantosh | Northeastern Illinois |
| Jim Jasper | Northeastern Illinois |
| Bryan Kelly | Troy State |
| Kenny Krey | Troy State |
| Chris Langford | Troy State |
| Brian Quinn | Western Illinois |
| Mark Raciti | Northeastern Illinois |
| Jorge Soto | Troy State |

=== Tournament Most Valuable Player ===
Bryan Kelly of Troy State was named Tournament MVP.
