= Chris Sperry =

American college baseball coach (born 1965)

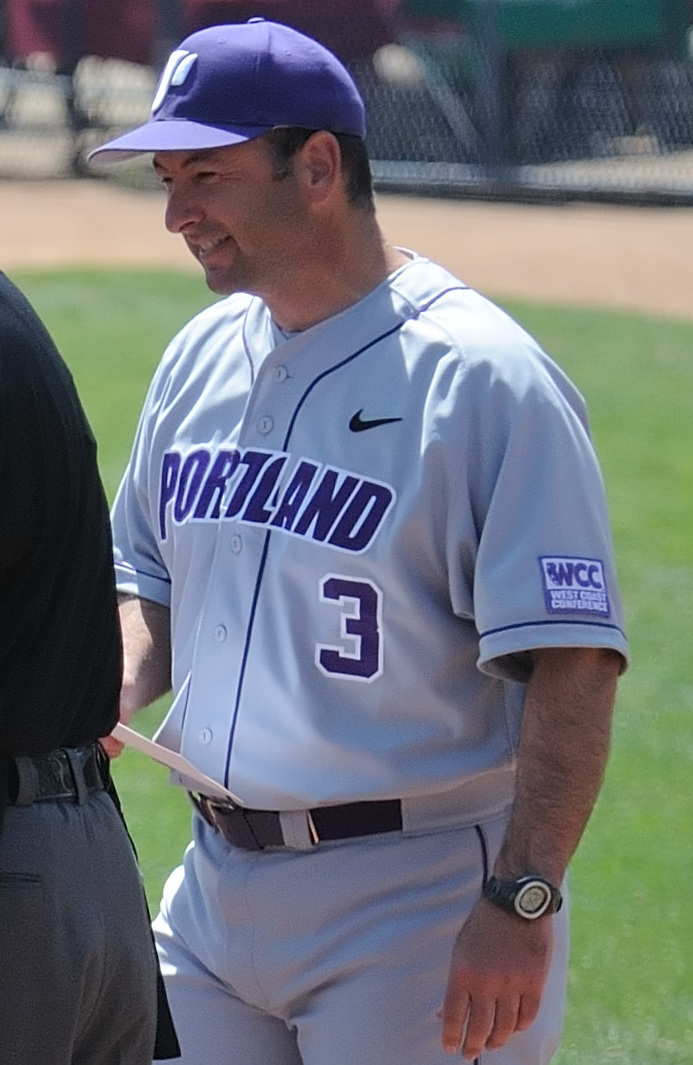
- Sperry with Portland in 2009

Biographical details
- Born: November 11, 1965 (age 60); Vancouver, Washington, U.S.

Playing career
- 1985–1987, 1989: Portland

Coaching career (HC unless noted)
- 1996–1997: Centralia (asst.)
- 1998–2015: Portland

Head coaching record
- Overall: 346–602–1

Christopher P. Sperry is a former American college baseball coach, formerly the head coach of the Portland Pilots baseball team from 1998 to 2015.

Sperry played four seasons at Portland as an infielder and catcher, earning All-Pac-10 honors in 1987 and helping the Pilots to the Conference Tournament title in 1989. He played a single season in the Los Angeles Dodgers organization. He later served as an assistant coach at A.C. Davis High School in Yakima, Washington from 1993 through 1995, while also assisting area American Legion Baseball teams. Sperry became an assistant at Centralia, serving for two seasons, and was the head coach of the 1997 Oregon team at the Olympic Trials. He earned a spot as top assistant at Portland State in September 1997, but left before seeing a game played to become head coach at Portland. He held the position for 18 seasons before the school fired him at the end of the 2015 season.

== Head coaching record ==
Record table
Season	Team	Overall	Conference	Standing	Postseason
Portland Pilots (West Coast Conference) (1998–2015)
1998	Portland	10–39	5–22	8th (8)	
1999	Portland	23–28	16–14	2nd Coast (4)	
2000	Portland	24–27	13–17	3rd West (4)	
2001	Portland	20–34	9–21	4th West (4)	
2002	Portland	24–30	16–14	2nd West (4)	
2003	Portland	9–45–1	5–24–1	4th West (4)	
2004	Portland	12–44	6–24	4th West (4)	
2005	Portland	17–36	7–23	4th West (4)	
2006	Portland	15–37	3–18	8th (8)	
2007	Portland	21–30	7–14	7th (8)	
2008	Portland	21–33	3–18	8th (8)	
2009	Portland	25–26	7–14	7th (8)	
2010	Portland	34–18	14–7	2nd (8)	
2011	Portland	23–31	11–10	T-3rd (8)	
2012	Portland	27–25	12–12	6th (9)	
2013	Portland	18–36	8–16	8th (9)	
2014	Portland	11–41	5–22	10th (10)	
2015	Portland	12–42	7–20	10th	
Portland:		346–602–1	154–310–1		
Total:		346–602–1			
National champion Postseason invitational champion Conference regular season champion Conference regular season and conference tournament champion Division regular season champion Division regular season and conference tournament champion Conference tournament champion
