= 1997 Big South Conference baseball tournament =

- Teams: 4
- Format: Double-elimination
- Finals site: Knights Stadium; Fort Mill, South Carolina
- Champions: UNC Greensboro (1st title)
- Winning coach: Mike Gaski (1st title)
- MVP: Jason Parsons (UNC Greensboro)

1997 Big South Conference baseball standings
	Conf.						Overall
Team	W		L		T	PCT	W		L		T	PCT
No. 28 UNC Greensboro ‍†‍‡‍^{y}	18	–	3	–	0	.857	45	–	17	–	0	.726
Winthrop ‍‍‍	14	–	7	–	0	.667	27	–	29	–	1	.482
Charleston Southern ‍‍‍	12	–	8	–	0	.600	21	–	36	–	0	.368
Liberty ‍‍‍	11	–	10	–	0	.524	25	–	32	–	0	.439
UNC Asheville ‍‍‍	9	–	11	–	0	.450	20	–	33	–	0	.377
Radford ‍‍‍	9	–	12	–	0	.429	26	–	28	–	0	.481
UMBC ‍‍‍	5	–	16	–	0	.238	12	–	35	–	0	.255
Coastal Carolina ‍‍‍	5	–	16	–	0	.238	23	–	31	–	0	.426
† – Conference champion ‡ – Tournament champion y – Invited to the NCAA tournament As of June 30, 1997; Rankings from Collegiate Baseball

The 1997 Big South Conference baseball tournament was the postseason baseball tournament for the Big South Conference, held from May 16 through 18 at Knights Stadium in Fort Mill, South Carolina. The top four finishers from the regular season participated in the double-elimination tournament. The champion, UNC Greensboro, won the title for the first time and earned an invitation to the 1997 NCAA Division I baseball tournament.

== Format ==
The top four finishers from the regular season qualified for the tournament. The teams were seeded one through four and played a double-elimination tournament.

Team	W	L	Pct.	GB	Seed
UNC Greensboro	18	3	.857	—	1
Winthrop	14	7	.667	4	2
Charleston Southern	12	8	.600	5.5	3
Liberty	11	10	.524	7	4
UNC Asheville	9	11	.450	8.5	—
Radford	9	12	.429	9	—
UMBC	5	16	.238	13	—
Coastal Carolina	5	16	.238	13	—

== Bracket and results ==
First round
1	UNC Greensboro	9
4	Liberty	18
3	Charleston Southern	10
2	Winthrop	9
Lower round 1
1	UNC Greensboro	4
2	Winthrop	3

Semi-finals
4	Liberty	1
3	Charleston Southern	4
Lower final
4	Liberty	1
1	UNC Greensboro	2

Finals
3	Charleston Southern
1	UNC Greensboro

== All-Tournament Team ==
Name	School
B.J. Bellush	Charleston Southern
Jason Benham	Liberty
Tony Costantino	Winthrop
Travis Easler	Charleston Southern
Mike Giordano	Liberty
Ryan McClellan	Liberty
Jason Parsons	UNC Greensboro
Dominic Pattie	UNC Greensboro
Nicky Phillips	UNC Greensboro
John Rocco	Charleston Southern
Lance Surridge	UNC Greensboro

=== Most Valuable Player ===
Jason Parsons was named Tournament Most Valuable Player. Parsons was a pitcher for UNC Greensboro.
