= 1997 Big West Conference baseball tournament =

American college baseball tournament

- Teams: 6
- Format: Double-elimination tournament
- Finals site: Blair Field; Long Beach, CA
- Champions: Cal State Fullerton (2nd title)
- Winning coach: George Horton (1st title)

1997 Big West Conference baseball standings
	Conf.				Overall
Team	W		L	PCT	W		L	PCT
Northern
Nevada ^{x}‍‍‍	20	–	10	.667	39	–	21	.650
Pacific ‍‍‍	11	–	19	.367	29	–	29	.500
Sacramento State ‍‍‍	8	–	22	.267	16	–	39	.291
New Mexico State ‍‍‍	8	–	22	.267	21	–	33	.389
Southern
No. 24 Long Beach State ^{x}‍‍‍	22	–	8	.733	39	–	26	.600
No. 21 Cal State Fullerton ‍‍‍	21	–	9	.700	39	–	24	.619
Cal Poly ‍‍‍	15	–	15	.500	37	–	21	.638
UC Santa Barbara ‍‍‍	15	–	15	.500	26	–	30	.464
x – Division champion ‡ – Tournament champion y – Invited to the 1997 NCAA Division I baseball tournament As of June 30, 1997; Rankings from Collegiate Baseball

The 1997 Big West Conference baseball tournament determined the conference champion for the Big West Conference at the end of the 1997 season. The teams met at Long Beach State's on campus venue, Blair Field from May 15 through 18.

== Seeding and format ==
The top team from each of the conference's two divisions after the regular season received the top two seeds, while the four teams with the highest conference winning percentage regardless of division were seeded three through six in the double-elimination tournament. Matchups were set to avoid inter-divisional games in the early rounds as much as possible.

Team	W	L	PCT	GB	Seed
North Division
Nevada	20	10	.667	–	2
Pacific	11	19	.367	9	6
Sacramento State	8	22	.267	12	–
New Mexico State	8	22	.267	12	–
South Division
Long Beach State	22	8	.733	–	1
Cal State Fullerton	21	9	.700	1	3
Cal Poly	15	15	.500	7	4
UC Santa Barbara	15	15	.500	7	5

== Bracket ==
The bracket below depicts the results of the tournament.

First round
2	Nevada	10
4	Cal Poly	6
3	Cal State Fullerton	4
6	Pacific	6
1	Long Beach State	5
5	UC Santa Barbara	1

Second round
2	Nevada	10
3	Cal State Fullerton	11
4	Cal Poly	11
5	UC Santa Barbara	10
6	Pacific	0
1	Long Beach State	4
2	Nevada	5
6	Pacific	8

Third round
3	Cal State Fullerton	8
4	Cal Poly	5
1	Long Beach State	7
6	Pacific	6

Final
3	Cal State Fullerton	7	15
1	Long Beach State	2	6
