= 1997 Trans America Athletic Conference baseball tournament =

American college baseball tournament

- Teams: 6
- Format: Double-elimination
- Finals site: Conrad Park; DeLand, Florida
- Champions: UCF (4th title)
- Winning coach: Jay Bergman (4th title)
- MVP: Greg Pacitti (UCF)

1997 Trans America Athletic Conference baseball standings
	Conf.						Overall
Team	W		L		T	PCT	W		L		T	PCT
South
Stetson ^{x}‍‍‍^{y}	10	–	8	–	0	.556	37	–	26	–	1	.586
FIU ^{x}‍‍‍^{y}	10	–	8	–	0	.556	42	–	21	–	0	.667
Florida Atlantic ‍‍‍	8	–	9	–	0	.471	32	–	24	–	0	.571
UCF ‍‍‡‍^{y}	7	–	10	–	0	.412	40	–	24	–	0	.625
East
Mercer ^{x}‍‍‍	12	–	6	–	0	.667	36	–	23	–	0	.610
Georgia State ‍‍‍	10	–	8	–	0	.556	23	–	30	–	0	.434
Campbell ‍‍‍	7	–	11	–	0	.389	17	–	40	–	0	.298
College of Charleston ‍‍‍	7	–	11	–	0	.389	25	–	29	–	1	.464
West
Jacksonville State ^{x}‍†‍‍	14	–	4	–	0	.778	39	–	13	–	0	.750
Southeastern Louisiana ‍‍‍	11	–	7	–	0	.611	34	–	24	–	0	.586
Samford ‍‍‍	8	–	10	–	0	.444	31	–	29	–	0	.517
Centenary ‍‍‍	3	–	15	–	0	.167	11	–	39	–	0	.220
x – Division champion † – Conference champion ‡ – Tournament champion y – Invited to the NCAA tournament As of June 30, 1997; Rankings from Collegiate Baseball

The 1997 Trans America Athletic Conference baseball tournament was held at Conrad Park on the campus of Stetson in DeLand, Florida. This was the nineteenth tournament championship held by the Trans America Athletic Conference. UCF won their fourth tournament championship in five years, and third in a row, and earned the conference's automatic bid to the 1997 NCAA Division I baseball tournament.

== Format and seeding ==
The top six finishers by overall winning percentage qualified for the tournament, with the top seed playing the lowest seed in the first round. Florida Atlantic and Jacksonville State did not qualify as they completed their transition from NCAA Division II.

Team	W	L	T	Pct.	Seed
South
Stetson	34	22	1	.605	2
FIU	40	17	0	.702	4
Florida Atlantic	32	24	0	.571	—
UCF	36	22	0	.621	6

Team	W	L	T	Pct.	Seed
East
Mercer	36	21	0	.632	1
Georgia State	23	30	0	.434	—
Campbell	17	40	0	.298	—
College of Charleston	25	29	1	.464	—

Team	W	L	T	Pct.	Seed
West
Jacksonville State	39	13	0	.750	—
Southeastern Louisiana	34	22	0	.607	3
Samford	30	27	0	.526	5
Centenary	11	39	0	.220	—

== Bracket ==
First round
1	Mercer	4
6	UCF	11
3	Southeastern Louisiana	5
4	FIU	8
2	Stetson	4
5	Samford	3

Second round
6	UCF	17
3	Southeastern Louisiana	9
4	FIU	3^{12}
2	Stetson	2
1	Mercer	0
5	Samford	6

Third round
6	UCF	8
4	FIU	4
2	Stetson	6
5	Samford	3

Semifinals
4	FIU	3
2	Stetson	4

Final
6	UCF	14	—
2	Stetson	9	—

== All-Tournament Team ==
The following players were named to the All-Tournament Team.

POS	Player	School
P	Jeff Newman	Samford
P	Eric Knott	Stetson
C	Eric Johnson	UCF
IF	Pat Williamson	UCF
IF	Clint Chrysler	Stetson
IF	Eric Riggs	UCF
IF	Bryan Bruce	UCF
OF	Sean Mahoney	FIU
OF	C.J. Fagan	Stetson
OF	Todd Bellhorn	UCF
OF	Gregg Pacitti	UCF

=== Most Valuable Player ===
Greg Pacitti was named Tournament Most Valuable Player. Pacitti was an outfielder for UCF.
