= 1997 Big Ten baseball tournament =

1997 Big Ten Conference baseball tournament
- Teams: 4
- Format: Double-elimination
- Finals site: Ray Fisher Stadium; Ann Arbor, MI
- Champions: Ohio State (4th title)
- Winning coach: Bob Todd (4th title)
- MVP: Mike Lockwood (Ohio State)

1997 Big Ten Conference baseball standings
	Conf.				Overall
Team	W		L	PCT	W		L	PCT
Michigan ‍†‍‍	17	–	9	.654	36	–	22	.621
No. 30 Ohio State ‍‍‡‍^{y}	18	–	10	.643	42	–	18	.700
Purdue ‍‍‍	17	–	11	.607	30	–	25	.545
Illinois ‍‍‍	17	–	11	.607	32	–	27	.542
Minnesota ‍‍‍	15	–	10	.600	30	–	24	.556
Penn State ‍‍‍	12	–	14	.462	29	–	24	.547
Michigan State ‍‍‍	12	–	16	.429	26	–	28	.481
Indiana ‍‍‍	8	–	16	.333	33	–	22	.600
Northwestern ‍‍‍	9	–	19	.321	20	–	35	.364
Iowa ‍‍‍	7	–	16	.304	17	–	30	.362
x – Division champion ‡ – Tournament champion y – Invited to the NCAA tournament As of June 30, 1997; Rankings from Collegiate Baseball

The 1997 Big Ten Conference baseball tournament was held at Ray Fisher Stadium on the campus of the University of Michigan in Ann Arbor, Michigan, from May 15 through 19. The top four teams from the regular season participated in the double-elimination tournament, the seventeenth annual tournament sponsored by the Big Ten Conference to determine the league champion. Ohio State won their fourth tournament championship and earned the Big Ten Conference's automatic bid to the 1997 NCAA Division I baseball tournament.

== Format and seeding ==
The 1997 tournament was a 4-team double-elimination tournament, with seeds determined by conference regular season winning percentage only.

Team	W	L	PCT	GB	Seed
Michigan	17	9	.654	–	1
Ohio State	18	10	.643	–	2
Purdue	17	11	.607	1	3
Illinois	17	11	.607	1	4
Minnesota	15	10	.600	1.5	–
Penn State	12	14	.462	5	–
Michigan State	12	16	.429	5	–
Indiana	8	16	.333	8	–
Northwestern	9	19	.321	9	–
Iowa	7	16	.304	8	–

== Tournament ==
Upper round 1
1	Michigan	8
4	Illinois	4
2	Ohio State	4
3	Purdue	2
Lower round 1
4	Illinois	8
3	Purdue	3

Upper final
1	Michigan	2
2	Ohio State	9
Lower final
1	Michigan	7
4	Illinois	5

Final
2	Ohio State	8
1	Michigan	5

== All-Tournament Team ==
The following players were named to the All-Tournament Team.

Pos	Name	School
P	Brett Weber	Illinois
P	Justin Fry	Ohio State
C	Mike Kremblas	Ohio State
1B	Bryan Besco	Michigan
2B	D. J. Svihlik	Illinois
SS	Brian Kalczynski	Michigan
3B	Mike Cervenak	Michigan
OF	Derek Besco	Michigan
OF	Jason Driscoll	Ohio State
OF	Mike Lockwood	Ohio State
DH	Jason Trott	Ohio State

=== Most Outstanding Player ===
Mike Lockwood was named Most Outstanding Player. Lockwood was an outfielder for Ohio State.
