= Texas State Bobcats baseball =

Baseball team representing Texas State University

- 2026 Texas State Bobcats baseball team
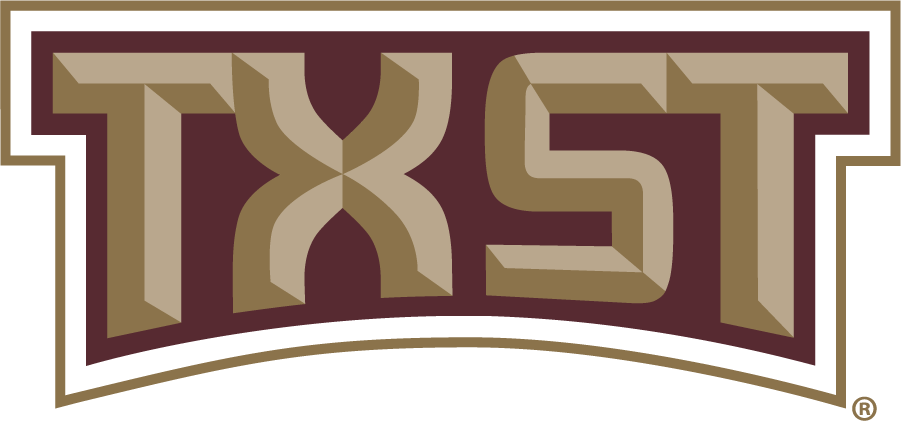
- Founded: 1985; 41 years ago
- University: Texas State University
- Head coach: Steven Trout (7th season)
- Conference: Pac-12
- Location: San Marcos, Texas
- Home stadium: Bobcat Ballpark (capacity: 2,400)
- Nickname: Bobcats
- Colors: Maroon and gold

NCAA tournament appearances
- 1997, 1999, 2000, 2009, 2011, 2022, 2026

Conference tournament champions
- Southland Conference: 1997, 1999, 2000, 2011

Conference regular season champions
- Southland: 2009, 2010, 2011; Sun Belt: 2019, 2022

The Texas State Bobcats baseball program is the intercollegiate baseball team representing Texas State University. The Bobcats' first season was in 1985, and have played their home games at Bobcat Ballpark on the university's campus in San Marcos, Texas since 2009.

Since 2026, the Bobcats have competed as a member of the Pac-12 Conference. Previously, the Bobcats were a member of the Sun Belt Conference, Western Athletic Conference (WAC), Southland Conference, and Gulf Star Conference.

== History ==
Ty Harrington (University of Texas at Austin '89) began his tenure as Texas State baseball's fourth head coach in the 2000 season and compiled an overall record of 657-516-2 over 20 seasons. His overall record includes a 265-146 record in the Southland Conference and a 95-85 record in the Sun Belt Conference. Harrington was honored as the Southland Conference Coach of the Year in 2009 and 2011. Texas State won three consecutive regular season SLC championships in 2009, 2010 and 2011 under Harrington. His teams also won the SLC tournament championship in 2000 and 2011 and made three NCAA Championship Regional appearances in 2000, 2009 and 2011. Harrington guided Texas State to its first Sun Belt Conference regular season championship in 2019. He has helped produce 88 all-conference selections, 10 All-Americans, seven conference players of the year and 53 Major League Baseball Draftees. On June 20, 2019, Harrington retired after 20 seasons at Texas State.

On July 1, 2019, Steven Trout was named Texas State baseball's fifth head coach. Trout previously served as Texas State's associate head coach for the 2018 and 2019 seasons and as an assistant coach in 2016 and 2017. Prior to his current stint with the Bobcats, Trout was an assistant coach on the West Virginia Mountaineers staff from 2013 to 2015.

== Texas State in the NCAA tournament ==
Year	Record	Pct	Notes
1997	2–2	.500	Central Regional
1999	0–2	.000	Houston Regional
2000	1–2	.333	Waco Regional
2009	0–2	.000	Austin Regional
2011	1–2	.333	Austin Regional
2022	2–2	.500	Stanford Regional
2026	1–2	.333	College Station Regional
TOTALS	7–14	.333	

== Bobcat Ballpark ==
Texas State hosted the Texas Longhorns in Bobcat Ballpark's first game on March 3, 2009 in front of a then-record 2,593 spectators. As of the end of the 2019 season, the Bobcats have a 225-116-1 record at the facility.

Bobcat Ballpark Attendance Records
	Date	Opponent	Result	Attendance
1.	March 21, 2017	Texas	W, 11-10 (10)	3,017
2.	March 28, 2017	Texas A&M	L, 9-3	2,952
3.	March 1, 2016	Texas	L, 10-4 (11)	2,776
4.	March 24, 2015	Texas	L, 6-4	2,653
T-5.	March 30, 2010	Texas A&M	W, 6-5 (11)	2,603
T-5.	March 11, 2014	Texas	L, 6-3	2,603
7.	March 3, 2009	Texas	L, 6-5	2,593
8.	March 27, 2018	Texas	L, 6-1	2,547
9.	April 23, 2013	Texas A&M	W, 4-1	2,512
10.	February 14, 2014	Michigan	W, 8-7 (10)	2,439

== Year-by-year results ==
Record table
Season	Coach	Overall	Conference	Standing	Postseason
Independent (1984)
1984	Dr. William Pool	18–31			
Independent:		18–31			
Gulf Star Conference (1985–1987)
1985	Jay Jeffrey	29–27			
1986	Jay Jeffrey	31–25			
1987	Steve Prentice	39–21–2			
Gulf Star:		99–73–2			
Southland Conference (1988–2012)
1988	Steve Prentice	31–27	7–11	7th	
1989	Steve Prentice	31–24	10–8	4th	
1990	Steve Prentice	31–22–1	7–11	6th	
1991	Steve Prentice	33–15	4–7	7th	
1992	Steve Prentice	31–19	11–10	3rd	
1993	Steve Prentice	26–29	8–15	8th	
1994	Howard Bushong	28–23	10–13	7th	
1995	Howard Bushong	23–31	10–14	6th	
1996	Howard Bushong	29–22	10–15	8th	
1997	Howard Bushong	38–26	8–11	1st (TX Division)	NCAA Regionals
1998	Howard Bushong	28–28	13–11	5th	
1999	Howard Bushong	27–32	15–12	3rd	NCAA Regionals
2000	Ty Harrington	34–29	16–11	3rd	NCAA Regionals
2001	Ty Harrington	36–22	15–11	4th	
2002	Ty Harrington	36–24	14–13	6th	
2003	Ty Harrington	30–28	19–7	2nd	
2004	Ty Harrington	32–26	16–10	3rd	
2005	Ty Harrington	32–26	15–12	3rd	
2006	Ty Harrington	29–30	20–10	3rd	
2007	Ty Harrington	37–23	20–10	2nd (West)	
2008	Ty Harrington	30–27	19–11	2nd (West)	
2009	Ty Harrington	41–17	24–7	1st	NCAA Regionals
2010	Ty Harrington	38–22	23–10	1st	
2011	Ty Harrington	41–23	24–9	1st	NCAA Regional
2012	Ty Harrington	32–24	19–14	4th	
Southland:		812–629–1	357–273		
Western Athletic Conference (2013)
2013	Ty Harrington	29–29	16–11	3rd	
WAC:		29–29	16–11		
Sun Belt Conference (2014–present)
2014	Ty Harrington	30–28	16–14	4th	
2015	Ty Harrington	24–32–1	14–16	6th	
2016	Ty Harrington	31–28	16–14	5th	
2017	Ty Harrington	29–30	13–17	4th (West)	
2018	Ty Harrington	30–28–1	16–14	2nd (West)	
2019	Ty Harrington	36–20	20–10	1st (West)	
2020	Steven Trout	14–4	0–0	No conference season	Season canceled due to the COVID-19 pandemic
2021	Steven Trout	21–36	9–15	6th (West)	
2022	Steven Trout	47-14	26-4	1st	NCAA Regional
2023	Steven Trout	36-23	17-13	5th	
2024	Steven Trout	27-29	13-17	T-10th	
Sun Belt:		325–272–2	160–134		
Total:		1,283–1,034–5			
National champion Postseason invitational champion Conference regular season champion Conference regular season and conference tournament champion Division regular season champion Division regular season and conference tournament champion Conference tournament champion

== Notable players ==
- Will Brunson
- Tommy Field
- Jeremy Fikac
- Paul Goldschmidt
- Billy Grabarkewitz
- Billy Jones
- Scott Linebrink
- Carson Smith
- Joe Vance
- Blake Williams
- Kyle Finnegan

== See also ==
- List of NCAA Division I baseball programs
