= 2014 Florida Gators baseball team =

American college baseball season

2014 Florida Gators baseball

SEC regular season champions

Gainesville Regional, 0–2
- Conference: Southeastern Conference

Ranking
- Coaches: No. 24
- CB: No. 24
- Record: 40–23 (21–9 SEC)
- Head coach: Kevin O'Sullivan (7th year)
- Assistant coach: Craig Bell (7th year); Brad Weitzel (7th year)
- Home stadium: Alfred A. McKethan Stadium

2014 Southeastern Conference baseball standings
	Conf.						Overall
Team	W		L		T	PCT	W		L		T	PCT
Eastern
No. 24 Florida ^{x}‍†‍‍^{y}	21	–	9	–	0	.700	40	–	23	–	0	.635
No. 25 South Carolina ‍‍‍^{y}	18	–	12	–	0	.600	44	–	18	–	0	.710
No. 1 Vanderbilt ‍‍‍^{y}	17	–	13	–	0	.567	51	–	21	–	0	.708
Kentucky ‍‍‍^{y}	14	–	16	–	0	.467	37	–	25	–	0	.597
Tennessee ‍‍‍	12	–	18	–	0	.400	31	–	23	–	0	.574
Georgia ‍‍‍	11	–	18	–	1	.383	26	–	29	–	1	.473
Missouri ‍‍‍	6	–	24	–	0	.200	20	–	33	–	0	.377
Western
No. 4 Ole Miss ^{x}‍‍‍^{y}	19	–	11	–	0	.633	48	–	21	–	0	.696
No. 21 LSU ‍‍‡‍^{y}	17	–	11	–	1	.603	46	–	16	–	1	.738
No. 28 Mississippi State ‍‍‍^{y}	18	–	12	–	0	.600	39	–	24	–	0	.619
No. 30 Arkansas ‍‍‍^{y}	16	–	14	–	0	.533	40	–	25	–	0	.615
Alabama ‍‍‍^{y}	15	–	14	–	0	.517	37	–	24	–	0	.607
Texas A&M ‍‍‍^{y}	14	–	16	–	0	.467	36	–	26	–	0	.581
Auburn ‍‍‍	10	–	20	–	0	.333	28	–	28	–	0	.500
x – Division champion † – Conference champion ‡ – Tournament champion y – Invited to the NCAA tournament Rankings from Collegiate Baseball

The 2014 Florida Gators baseball team represented the University of Florida in the sport of baseball during the 2014 college baseball season. This was the Gators' 100th season of baseball. They competed in Division I of the National Collegiate Athletic Association (NCAA) and the Eastern Division of the Southeastern Conference (SEC). They played their home games at Alfred A. McKethan Stadium on the university's Gainesville, Florida campus. The team was coached by Kevin O'Sullivan, who was in his seventh season at Florida. The Gators entered the season looking to build upon their appearance in the 2013 NCAA tournament, where they were eliminated after consecutive losses to Austin Peay and Valparaiso.

== Roster ==
=== By player ===
2014 Florida Gators baseball team
Players
Coaches

#	Pos.	Name	B/T	Height	Weight	Year	Home town
20	INF	Pete Alonso	R/R	6 ft 2 in (1.88 m)	225 lb (102 kg)	Fr	Tampa, FL
37	RHP	Shaun Anderson	R/R	6 ft 4 in (1.93 m)	225 lb (102 kg)	Fr	Coral Springs, FL
8	OF	Harrison Bader	R/R	5 ft 11 in (1.8 m)	190 lb (86 kg)	So	Bronxville, NY
4	RHP	Jay Carmichael	R/R	6 ft 2 in (1.88 m)	175 lb (79 kg)	So	Cape Coral, FL
26	LHP	Tyler Deel	L/L	6 ft 5 in (1.96 m)	190 lb (86 kg)	Fr	Jacksonville, FL
3	RHP	Dane Dunning	R/R	6 ft 3 in (1.91 m)	190 lb (86 kg)	Fr	Fleming Island, FL
29	C	Mike Fahrman	R/R	6 ft 0 in (1.83 m)	210 lb (95 kg)	Jr	Tampa, FL
17	C	Taylor Gushue	S/R	6 ft 2 in (1.88 m)	215 lb (98 kg)	Jr	Boca Raton, FL
25	RHP	Eric Hanhold	R/R	6 ft 5 in (1.96 m)	205 lb (93 kg)	So	Palm Harbor, FL
24	RHP	Ryan Harris	R/R	6 ft 2 in (1.88 m)	210 lb (95 kg)	Jr	Jupiter, FL
28	RHP	Keenan Kish	L/R	6 ft 4 in (1.93 m)	205 lb (93 kg)	RS Jr	Worcester, PA
66	OF	Ryan Larson	R/R	6 ft 0 in (1.83 m)	185 lb (84 kg)	Fr	Orlando, FL
38	INF	Jason Lombardozzi	S/R	5 ft 11 in (1.8 m)	180 lb (82 kg)	So	Chambersburg, PA
12	INF	Richie Martin	R/R	6 ft 0 in (1.83 m)	185 lb (84 kg)	So	Brandon, FL
33	C	Braden Mattson	R/R	6 ft 3 in (1.91 m)	205 lb (93 kg)	Jr	San Antonio, TX
34	RHP	Brett Morales	R/R	6 ft 1 in (1.85 m)	195 lb (88 kg)	Fr	Tampa, FL
30	LHP	Scott Moss	L/L	6 ft 5 in (1.96 m)	210 lb (95 kg)	Fr	Deltona, FL
6	C	Keith Oren	R/R	6 ft 1 in (1.85 m)	190 lb (86 kg)	Fr	Plantation, FL
35	RHP	Dean Pelman	R/R	5 ft 11 in (1.8 m)	210 lb (95 kg)	Fr	Weston, FL
5	INF	Zack Powers	L/R	6 ft 3 in (1.91 m)	205 lb (93 kg)	Jr	Seffner, FL
14	LHP	Bobby Poyner	L/L	6 ft 0 in (1.83 m)	205 lb (93 kg)	Jr	Wellington, FL
10	LHP	A.J. Puk	L/L	6 ft 7 in (2.01 m)	230 lb (104 kg)	Fr	Cedar Rapids, IA
23	OF	Buddy Reed	S/R	6 ft 3 in (1.91 m)	200 lb (91 kg)	Fr	Finksburg, MD
27	RHP	Aaron Rhodes	L/R	5 ft 11 in (1.8 m)	190 lb (86 kg)	So	Venice, FL
39	RHP	Frank Rubio	R/R	5 ft 11 in (1.8 m)	185 lb (84 kg)	Fr	Miami Shores, FL
16	RHP	Justin Shafer	R/R	6 ft 2 in (1.88 m)	210 lb (95 kg)	Jr	Lake Wales, FL
32	RHP	Logan Shore	R/R	6 ft 1 in (1.85 m)	210 lb (95 kg)	Fr	Coon Rapids, MN
13	LHP	Kirby Snead	R/R	6 ft 0 in (1.83 m)	190 lb (86 kg)	Fr	Alachua, FL
44	INF	John Sternagel	L/L	6 ft 1 in (1.85 m)	205 lb (93 kg)	Fr	Rockledge, FL
21	LHP	Corey Stump	R/R	6 ft 5 in (1.96 m)	215 lb (98 kg)	RS So	Lakeland, FL
11	INF	Josh Tobias	S/R	5 ft 10 in (1.78 m)	205 lb (93 kg)	Jr	Greensboro, NC
2	INF	Casey Turgeon	L/R	5 ft 9 in (1.75 m)	165 lb (75 kg)	Jr	Palm Harbor, FL
18	RHP	Mike Vinson	R/R	6 ft 4 in (1.93 m)	210 lb (95 kg)	So	Miami, FL
22	RHP	Karsten Whitson	R/R	6 ft 4 in (1.93 m)	225 lb (102 kg)	RS Jr	Chipley, FL
15	LHP	Danny Young	L/L	6 ft 2 in (1.88 m)	200 lb (91 kg)	So	Boca Raton, FL

Head coach

7 Kevin O'Sullivan

Assistant coach(es)

33 Craig Bell
42 Brad Weitzel

Legend

- (C) Team captain
- (S) Suspended
- (I) Ineligible
- Injured
- Current redshirt

Roster

=== By position ===
2014 Florida Gators roster
Pitchers: 3 – Dane Dunning – Freshman; 4 – Jay Carmichael – Sophomore; 10 – A. J. Puk – Freshman; 13 – Kirby Snead – Freshman; 14 – Bobby Poyner – Junior; 15 – Danny Young – Sophomore; 16 – Justin Shafer – Junior; 18 – Mike Vinson – Sophomore; 21 – Corey Stump – (redshirt) Sophomore; 22 – Karsten Whitson – (redshirt) Junior; 24 – Ryan Harris – Junior; 25 – Eric Hanhold – Sophomore; 26 – Tyler Deel – Freshman; 27 – Aaron Rhodes – Sophomore; 28 – Keenan Kish – (redshirt) Junior; 30 – Scott Moss – Freshman; 32 – Logan Shore – Freshman; 34 – Brett Morales – Freshman; 35 – Dean Pelman – Freshman; 37 – Shaun Anderson – Freshman; 39 – Frank Rubio – Freshman	Catchers: 6 – Keith Oren – Freshman; 17 – Taylor Gushue – Junior; 29 – Mike Fahrman – Junior; 33 – Braden Mattson – Junior; Infielders: 2 – Casey Turgeon – Junior; 5 – Zack Powers – Junior; 10 – A. J. Puk – Freshman; 11 – Josh Tobias – Junior; 12 – Richie Martin – Sophomore; 20 – Pete Alonso – Freshman; 38 – Jason Lombardozzi – Sophomore; 44 – John Sternagel – Freshman	Outfielders: 8 – Harrison Bader – Sophomore; 16 – Justin Shafer – Junior; 23 – Buddy Reed – Freshman; 66 – Ryan Larson – Freshman

== Coaches ==
Coaching Staff
- Kevin O'Sullivan – Head coach – 7th year
- Craig Bell – Assistant coach – 7th year
- Brad Weitzel – Assistant coach – 7th year
- Buddy Munroe – Volunteer assistant coach – 3rd year
- Jon Michelini – Athletic trainer – 1st year
- Paul Chandler – Strength & conditioning coordinator – 5th year

== Schedule ==
2014 Florida Gators baseball game log
Regular season
February

Date	Opponent	Rank	Stadium Site	Score	Win	Loss	Save	Attendance	Overall Record	SEC Record
February 14	Maryland	No. 20	McKethan Stadium	4–0	Poyner (1–0)	Stinnett (0–1)	Young (1)	4,026	1–0	–
February 15	Maryland	No. 20	McKethan Stadium	7–9	Shawaryn (1–0)	Morales (0–1)	Mooney (1)	3,900	1–1	–
February 16	Maryland	No. 20	McKethan Stadium	8–5^{8}	Hanhold (1–0)	Price (0–1)	Harris (1)	3,742	2–1	–
February 18	UCF	No. 20	McKethan Stadium	5–1	Young (1–0)	Marotta (0–1)	None	2,994	3–1	–
February 19	North Florida	No. 20	McKethan Stadium	8–7	Harris (1–0)	McMahon (0–1)	Anderson (1)	2,740	4–1	–
February 21	at No. 17 Miami (FL); Rivalry	No. 20	Alex Rodriguez Park; Coral Gables, FL	4–6	Diaz (2–0)	Poyner (1–1)	Garcia (1)	3,481	4–2	–
February 22	at No. 17 Miami (FL); Rivalry	No. 20	Alex Rodriguez Park	2–5	Hammond (1–0)	Hanhold (1–1)	Garcia (2)	4,076	4–3	–
February 23	at No. 17 Miami (FL); Rivalry	No. 20	Alex Rodriguez Park	6–4	Puk (1–0)	Suarez (1–1)	Hanhold (1)	3,500	5–3	–
February 27	Florida Gulf Coast	No. 23	McKethan Stadium	1–2	Murray (2–0)	Shore (0–1)	Anderson (3)	2,888	5–4	–
February 28	Illinois	No. 23	McKethan Stadium	0–6	Duchene (1–1)	Poyner (1–2)	None	3,097	5–5	–

March

Date	Opponent	Rank	Stadium Site	Score	Win	Loss	Save	Attendance	Overall Record	SEC Record
March 1	Florida Gulf Coast	No. 23	McKethan Stadium	4–0	Whitson (1–0)	Deckert (1–2)	Rhodes (1)	4,157	6–5	–
March 2	Illinois	No. 23	McKethan Stadium	1–5	Johnson (2–0)	Puk (1–1)	Jay (3)	3,132	6–6	–
March 4	vs. Southern Miss		Bayfront Stadium; Pensacola, FL	4–2	Rhodes (1–0)	Johnson (0–2)	Harris (2)	4,720	7–6	–
March 7	Connecticut		McKethan Stadium	1–0^{11}	Hanhold (2–1)	Ruotolo (1–2)	None	2,535	8–6	–
March 8	Connecticut		McKethan Stadium	2–1^{10}	Poyner (2–2)	Slade (0–1)	None	3,092	9–6	–
March 9	Connecticut		McKethan Stadium	6–5^{10}	Poyner (3–2)	Ruotolo (1–2)	None	3,015	10–6	–
March 12	Illinois State		McKethan Stadium	13–5	Young (2–0)	Learnard (1–2)	None	2,603	11–6	–
March 14	Arkansas		McKethan Stadium	2–1	Shore (1–1)	Beeks (3–2)	Rhodes (2)	3,120	12–6	1–0
March 15	Arkansas		McKethan Stadium	1–0	Hanhold (3–1)	Killian (0–3)	Harris (3)	3,557	13–6	2–0
March 16	Arkansas		McKethan Stadium	3–9	Stone (3–0)	Puk (1–2)	Gunn (2)	3,178	13–7	2–1
March 18	No. 1 Florida State; Rivalry		McKethan Stadium	3–1	Rhodes (2–0)	Miller (1–1)	Poyner (1)	5,657	14–7	2–1
March 21	at Texas A&M		Olsen Field; College Station, TX	5–3^{11}	Puk (2–2)	Jester (2–1)	Rhodes (3)	5,111	15–7	3–1
March 22	at Texas A&M		Olsen Field	4–5	Long (3–0)	Hanhold (3–2)	Jester (3)	5,726	15–8	3–2
March 23	at Texas A&M		Olsen Field	3–4^{11}	Minter (1–0)	Rhodes (2–1)	None	3,770	15–9	3–3
March 25	vs. No. 1 Florida State; Rivalry		Baseball Grounds; Jacksonville, FL	4–1	Young (3–0)	Miller (1–2)	Harris (4)	10,125	16–9	3–3
March 29 (1)	No. 4 LSU		McKethan Stadium	2–1	Rhodes (3–1)	Nola (5–1)	None	2,998	17–9	4–3
March 29 (2)	No. 4 LSU		McKethan Stadium	6–2	Shore (2–1)	Poche (5–2)	Poyner (2)	2,860	18–9	5–3
March 30	No. 4 LSU		McKethan Stadium	11–7	Snead (1–0)	Person (1–1)	None	4,012	19–9	6–3

April

Date	Opponent	Rank	Stadium Site	Score	Win	Loss	Save	Attendance	Overall Record	SEC Record
April 1	Florida Atlantic	No. 20	McKethan Stadium	4–5^{11}	Alexander (3–0)	Rhodes (3–2)	None	2,904	19–10	6–3
April 4	at No. 19 Kentucky	No. 20	Cliff Hagan Stadium; Lexington, KY	1–17	Reed (6–1)	Hanhold (3–3)	None	2,133	19–11	6–4
April 5	at No. 19 Kentucky	No. 20	Cliff Hagan Stadium	11–10	Shore (3–1)	Shepherd (5–2)	Puk (1)	1,992	20–11	7–4
April 6	at No. 19 Kentucky	No. 20	Cliff Hagan Stadium	8–9	Dwyer (3–1)	Poyner (3–3)	Cody (2)	1,920	20–12	7–5
April 8	at No. 1 Florida State; Rivalry	No. 25	Dick Howser Stadium; Tallahassee, FL	8–0	Young (4–0)	Strode (0–1)	None	6,514	21–12	7–5
April 11	at No. 4 South Carolina	No. 25	Carolina Stadium; Columbia, SC	1–4	Montgomery (5–2)	Shore (3–2)	Seddon (9)	8,242	21–13	7–6
April 12	at No. 4 South Carolina	No. 25	Carolina Stadium	4–3^{13}	Puk (3–2)	Seddon (1–1)	None	8,242	22–13	8–6
April 13	at No. 4 South Carolina	No. 25	Carolina Stadium	6–5	Dunning (1–0)	Crowe (6–2)	Hanhold (2)	8,242	23–13	9–6
April 15	vs. Florida Gulf Coast	No. 18	Hammond Stadium; Fort Myers, FL	7–1	Harris (2–0)	Anderson (2–2)	None	3,493	24–13	9–6
April 18	Georgia	No. 18	McKethan Stadium	3–2	Shore (4–2)	Lawlor (3–3)	Poyner (3)	3,355	25–13	10–6
April 19	Georgia	No. 18	McKethan Stadium	8–1	Rhodes (4–2)	Tyler (4–3)	None	3,596	26–13	11–6
April 20	Georgia	No. 18	McKethan Stadium	10–3	Young (5–0)	Boling (3–4)	None	3,046	27–13	12–6
April 22	Jacksonville	No. 12	McKethan Stadium	1–3	Russell (5–2)	Harris (2–1)	McRae (1)	2,535	27–14	12–6
April 23	Florida A&M	No. 12	McKethan Stadium	3–4	Fleming (3–3)	Anderson (0–1)	Weeks (1)	2,541	27–15	12–6
April 25	Missouri	No. 12	McKethan Stadium	7–1	Shore (5–2)	Graves (3–3)	None	3,744	28–15	13–6
April 26	Missouri	No. 12	McKethan Stadium	5–0	Rhodes (5–2)	Anderson (2–3)	None	2,925	29–15	14–6
April 27	Missouri	No. 12	McKethan Stadium	6–5^{10}	Poyner (4–3)	Fairbanks (4–5)	None	3,669	30–15	15–6

May

Date	Opponent	Rank	Stadium Site	Score	Win	Loss	Save	Attendance	Overall Record	SEC Record
May 2	at No. 20 Alabama	No. 12	Sewell–Thomas Stadium; Tuscaloosa, AL	7–3	Shore (6–2)	Turnbull (5–4)	Hanhold (3)	4,103	31–15	16–6
May 3	at No. 20 Alabama	No. 12	Sewell–Thomas Stadium	4–3	Puk (4–2)	Kamplain (5–3)	Harris (5)	4,191	32–15	17–6
May 4	at No. 20 Alabama	No. 12	Sewell–Thomas Stadium	13–3	Snead (2–0)	Keller (5–2)	None	3,662	33–15	18–6
May 6	Mercer	No. 8	McKethan Stadium	2–4	Barker (4–3)	Morales (0–2)	Kourtis (3)	2,722	33–16	18–6
May 8	No. 10 Vanderbilt	No. 8	McKethan Stadium	1–0	Shore (7–2)	Beede (7–6)	Poyner (4)	2,803	34–16	19–6
May 9	No. 10 Vanderbilt	No. 8	McKethan Stadium	0–3	Fulmer (4–1)	Dunning (1–1)	None	4,112	34–17	19–7
May 10	No. 10 Vanderbilt	No. 8	McKethan Stadium	2–16	Ferguson (3–3)	Whitson (1–1)	None	3,289	34–18	19–8
May 13	South Florida	No. 13	McKethan Stadium	8–2	Snead (3–0)	Pardo (1–2)	None	2,749	35–18	19–8
May 15	at Tennessee	No. 13	Lindsey Nelson Stadium; Knoxville, TN	5–4	Harris (3–1)	Lee (4–4)	Snead (1)	1,844	36–18	20–8
May 16 (1)	at Tennessee	No. 13	Lindsey Nelson Stadium	4–2	Puk (5–2)	Williams (5–5)	Snead (2)	2,516	37–18	21–8
May 16 (2)	at Tennessee	No. 13	Lindsey Nelson Stadium	5–7	Cox (5–1)	Anderson (0–2)	Lee (4)	2,396	37–19	21–9

Postseason
SEC Tournament

Date	Opponent	Rank	Stadium Site	Score	Win	Loss	Save	Attendance	Overall Record	SECT Record
May 21	vs. No. 22 (9) Kentucky	No. 12 (1)	Metropolitan Stadium; Hoover, AL	2–4	Cody (4–0)	Shore (7–3)	Shepherd (1)	7,526	37–20	0–1
May 22	vs. No. 6 (4) South Carolina	No. 12 (1)	Metropolitan Stadium	7–2	Poyner (5–3)	Wynkoop (7–5)	None	5,115	38–20	1–1
May 23	vs. (5) Mississippi State	No. 12 (1)	Metropolitan Stadium	5–1	Shafer (1–0)	Woodruff (1–3)	None	8,790	39–20	2–1
May 24	vs. No. 22 (9) Kentucky	No. 12 (1)	Metropolitan Stadium	6–5	Hanhold (4–3)	Shepherd (5–4)	None	8,116	40–20	3–1
May 25	vs. No. 8 (3) LSU	No. 12 (1)	Metropolitan Stadium	0–2	Person (3–1)	Harris (3–2)	McCune (5)	10,188	40–21	3–2

NCAA tournament: Gainesville Regional

Date	Opponent	Rank	Stadium Site	Score	Win	Loss	Save	Attendance	Overall Record	Regional Record
May 30	(4) College of Charleston	No. 8 (1)	McKethan Stadium	2–3	Bauer (6–2)	Shore (7–4)	Hanzik (15)	1,911	40–22	0–1
May 31	(3) North Carolina	No. 8 (1)	McKethan Stadium	2–5	Hovis (9–1)	Poyner (5–4)	None	1,855	40–23	0–2

Rankings from USA Today/ESPN Top 25 coaches' baseball poll. All times Eastern. Parenthesis indicate tournament seedings. Retrieved from FloridaGators.com

== Record vs. conference opponents ==
Last two do not qualify for conf. tourn. Blank are not scheduled. Blue are home games, otherwise away.

2014 SEC baseball records Source: 2014 SEC baseball game results
Team	W–L	ALA	ARK	AUB	FLA	UGA	KEN	LSU	MSU	MIZZ	MISS	SCAR	TENN	TAMU	VAN	Team	Div	SR	SW
ALA	15–14		1–2	2–1	0–3	.	2–1	1–1	1–2	.	3–0	1–2	2–1	2–1	.	ALA	W5	5–4	1–1
ARK	16–14	2–1		1–2	1–2	.	.	1–2	1–2	3–0	1–2	2–1	.	2–1	2–1	ARK	W4	5–5	1–0
AUB	10–20	1–2	2–1		.	.	1–2	0–3	0–3	1–2	0–3	1–2	2–1	2–1	.	AUB	W7	3–7	0–3
FLA	21–9	3–0	2–1	.		3–0	1–2	3–0	.	3–0	.	2–1	2–1	1–2	1–2	FLA	E1	7–3	4–0
UGA	11–18	.	.	.	0–3		1–2	0–2	1–2	2–1	1–2	2–1	2–1	2–1	0–3	UGA	E6	4–6	0–2
KEN	14–16	1–2	.	2–1	2–1	2–1		.	.	1–2	0–3	2–1	1–2	2–1	1–2	KEN	E4	5–5	0–1
LSU	17–11	1–1	2–1	3–0	0–3	2–0	.		3–0	.	2–1	.	2–1	1–2	1–2	LSU	W2	6–3	2–1
MSU	18–12	2–1	2–1	3–0	.	2–1	.	0–3		3–0	1–2	.	2–1	1–2	2–1	MSU	W3	7–3	2–1
MIZZ	6–24	.	0–3	2–1	0–3	1–2	2–1	.	0–3		0–3	0–3	1–2	.	0–3	MIZZ	E7	2–8	0–6
MISS	19–11	0–3	2–1	3–0	.	2–1	3–0	1–2	2–1	3–0		1–2	.	2–1	.	MISS	W1	7–3	3–1
SCAR	18–12	2–1	1–2	2–1	1–2	1–2	1–2	.	.	3–0	2–1		3–0	.	2–1	SCAR	E2	6–4	2–0
TENN	12–18	1–2	.	1–2	1–2	1–2	2–1	1–2	1–2	2–1	.	0–3		.	2–1	TENN	E5	3–7	0–1
TAMU	14–16	1–2	1–2	1–2	2–1	1–2	1–2	2–1	2–1	.	1–2	.	.		2–1	TAMU	W6	4–6	0–0
VAN	17–13	.	1–2	.	2–1	3–0	2–1	2–1	1–2	3–0	.	1–2	1–2	1–2		VAN	E3	5–5	2–0
Team	W–L	ALA	ARK	AUB	FLA	UGA	KEN	LSU	MSU	MIZZ	MISS	SCAR	TENN	TAMU	VAN	Team	Div	SR	SW

Updated for entire regular season. Georgia at LSU had a tie game.

== Gators in the MLB draft ==
Round	Selection	Player	Position	Team
4	131	Taylor Gushue	C	Pittsburgh Pirates
8	234	Justin Shafer	RHP	Toronto Blue Jays
11	344	Karsten Whitson	RHP	Boston Red Sox
24	735	Casey Turgeon	2B	St. Louis Cardinals
26	794	Ryan Harris	RHP	Boston Red Sox
34	1,025	Keenan Kish	RHP	Cincinnati Reds
