= 2014 Southeastern Conference baseball tournament =

- Teams: 12
- Format: See below
- Finals site: Hoover Metropolitan Stadium; Hoover, AL
- Champions: LSU (11th title)
- Winning coach: Paul Mainieri (5th title)
- MVP: Tyler Moore (LSU)
- Attendance: 120,386
- Television: ESPN2 (championship game)

2014 Southeastern Conference baseball standings
	Conf.						Overall
Team	W		L		T	PCT	W		L		T	PCT
Eastern
No. 24 Florida ^{x}‍†‍‍^{y}	21	–	9	–	0	.700	40	–	23	–	0	.635
No. 25 South Carolina ‍‍‍^{y}	18	–	12	–	0	.600	44	–	18	–	0	.710
No. 1 Vanderbilt ‍‍‍^{y}	17	–	13	–	0	.567	51	–	21	–	0	.708
Kentucky ‍‍‍^{y}	14	–	16	–	0	.467	37	–	25	–	0	.597
Tennessee ‍‍‍	12	–	18	–	0	.400	31	–	23	–	0	.574
Georgia ‍‍‍	11	–	18	–	1	.383	26	–	29	–	1	.473
Missouri ‍‍‍	6	–	24	–	0	.200	20	–	33	–	0	.377
Western
No. 4 Ole Miss ^{x}‍‍‍^{y}	19	–	11	–	0	.633	48	–	21	–	0	.696
No. 21 LSU ‍‍‡‍^{y}	17	–	11	–	1	.603	46	–	16	–	1	.738
No. 28 Mississippi State ‍‍‍^{y}	18	–	12	–	0	.600	39	–	24	–	0	.619
No. 30 Arkansas ‍‍‍^{y}	16	–	14	–	0	.533	40	–	25	–	0	.615
Alabama ‍‍‍^{y}	15	–	14	–	0	.517	37	–	24	–	0	.607
Texas A&M ‍‍‍^{y}	14	–	16	–	0	.467	36	–	26	–	0	.581
Auburn ‍‍‍	10	–	20	–	0	.333	28	–	28	–	0	.500
x – Division champion † – Conference champion ‡ – Tournament champion y – Invited to the NCAA tournament Rankings from Collegiate Baseball

The 2014 Southeastern Conference baseball tournament was held from May 20 through 25 at Hoover Metropolitan Stadium in Hoover, Alabama. The annual tournament determines the tournament champion of the Division I Southeastern Conference in college baseball. LSU claimed their record 11th tournament championship and earned the conference's automatic bid to the 2014 NCAA Division I baseball tournament.

The tournament has been held every year since 1977, with LSU claiming eleven championships, the most of any school. Original members Georgia and Kentucky along with 1992 addition Arkansas and 2012 additions Texas A&M and Missouri have never won the tournament. This is the seventeenth consecutive year and nineteenth overall that the event has been held at Hoover Metropolitan Stadium, known from 2007 through 2012 as Regions Park.

The SEC implemented experimental instant replay rules at the 2014 tournament. The rules allowed review of fair/foul, home run, and spectator interference calls.

== Format and seeding ==
The regular season division winners claimed the top two seeds and the next ten teams by conference winning percentage, regardless of division, claimed the remaining berths in the tournament. The bottom eight teams played a single-elimination opening round, followed by a double-elimination format until the semifinals, when the format reverted to single elimination through the championship game. This was the second year of this format.

Team	W–L–T	Pct	GB #1	Seed
Eastern Division
Florida	21–9	.700	–	1
South Carolina	18–12	.600	3	4
Vanderbilt	17–13	.567	4	6
Kentucky	14–16	.467	7	9
Tennessee	12–18	.400	9	11
Georgia	11–18–1	.379	9.5	12
Missouri	6–24	.200	15	–

Team	W–L–T	Pct	GB #1	Seed
Western Division
Ole Miss	19–11	.633	2	2
LSU	17–11–1	.603	2.5	3
Mississippi State	18–12	.600	3	5
Arkansas	16–14	.533	5	7
Alabama	15–14	.517	5.5	8
Texas A&M	14–16	.467	7	10
Auburn	10–20	.333	11	–

== Bracket ==
First round
6	Vanderbilt	3
11	Tennessee	2
7	Arkansas	4
10	Texas A&M	0
8	Alabama	1
9	Kentucky	7
5	Mississippi State	5
12	Georgia	4^{10}

Second round
3	LSU	11
6	Vanderbilt	1^{7}
2	Ole Miss	1
7	Arkansas	2
6	Vanderbilt	2
2	Ole Miss	7
1	Florida	2
9	Kentucky	4
4	South Carolina	0
5	Mississippi State	12^{7}
1	Florida	7
4	South Carolina	2

Third round
3	LSU	7
7	Arkansas	2
2	Ole Miss	7
7	Arkansas	8
9	Kentucky	7
5	Mississippi State	6^{12}
1	Florida	5
5	Mississippi State	1

Semifinals
3	LSU	11
7	Arkansas	1^{8}
9	Kentucky	5
1	Florida	6

Final
3	LSU	2
1	Florida	0

== All-Tournament Team ==
The following players were named to the All-Tournament Team.

Pos.	Player	School
P	Jared Poché	LSU
P	Aaron Nola	LSU
P	Karsten Whitson	Florida
C	Kade Scivicque	LSU
C	Gavin Collins	Mississippi State
1B	Tyler Moore	LSU
2B	Conner Hale	LSU
3B	Josh Tobias	Florida
3B	Austin Anderson	Ole Miss
SS	Alex Bregman	LSU
OF	Harrison Bader	Florida
OF	Mark Laird	LSU
OF	C.T. Bradford	Mississippi State
DH	Sean McMullen	LSU

Bold is MVP.
