= 2014 Arkansas Razorbacks baseball team =

American college baseball season

2014 Arkansas Razorbacks baseball
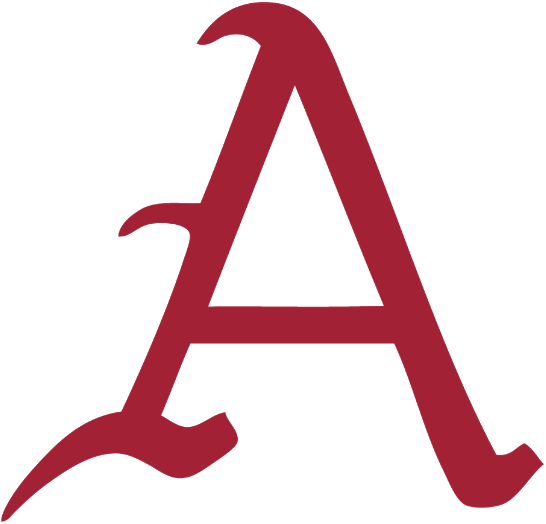

Charlottesville Regional, 2–2
- Conference: Southeastern Conference
- West
- Record: 40–25 (16–14 SEC)
- Head coach: Dave Van Horn
- Hitting coach: Tony Vitello
- Pitching coach: Dave Jorn
- Home stadium: Baum Stadium

2014 Southeastern Conference baseball standings
| | Conf. | | | | | | Overall |
| Team | W | | L | | T | PCT | W | | L | | T | PCT |
|---|---|---|---|---|---|---|---|---|---|---|---|---|
Eastern
| No. 24 Florida ^{x}‍†‍‍^{y} | 21 | – | 9 | – | 0 | .700 | 40 | – | 23 | – | 0 | .635 |
| No. 25 South Carolina ‍‍‍^{y} | 18 | – | 12 | – | 0 | .600 | 44 | – | 18 | – | 0 | .710 |
| No. 1 Vanderbilt ‍‍‍^{y} | 17 | – | 13 | – | 0 | .567 | 51 | – | 21 | – | 0 | .708 |
| Kentucky ‍‍‍^{y} | 14 | – | 16 | – | 0 | .467 | 37 | – | 25 | – | 0 | .597 |
| Tennessee ‍‍‍ | 12 | – | 18 | – | 0 | .400 | 31 | – | 23 | – | 0 | .574 |
| Georgia ‍‍‍ | 11 | – | 18 | – | 1 | .383 | 26 | – | 29 | – | 1 | .473 |
| Missouri ‍‍‍ | 6 | – | 24 | – | 0 | .200 | 20 | – | 33 | – | 0 | .377 |
Western
| No. 4 Ole Miss ^{x}‍‍‍^{y} | 19 | – | 11 | – | 0 | .633 | 48 | – | 21 | – | 0 | .696 |
| No. 21 LSU ‍‍‡‍^{y} | 17 | – | 11 | – | 1 | .603 | 46 | – | 16 | – | 1 | .738 |
| No. 28 Mississippi State ‍‍‍^{y} | 18 | – | 12 | – | 0 | .600 | 39 | – | 24 | – | 0 | .619 |
| No. 30 Arkansas ‍‍‍^{y} | 16 | – | 14 | – | 0 | .533 | 40 | – | 25 | – | 0 | .615 |
| Alabama ‍‍‍^{y} | 15 | – | 14 | – | 0 | .517 | 37 | – | 24 | – | 0 | .607 |
| Texas A&M ‍‍‍^{y} | 14 | – | 16 | – | 0 | .467 | 36 | – | 26 | – | 0 | .581 |
| Auburn ‍‍‍ | 10 | – | 20 | – | 0 | .333 | 28 | – | 28 | – | 0 | .500 |
x – Division champion † – Conference champion ‡ – Tournament champion y – Invited to the NCAA tournament Rankings from Collegiate Baseball

The 2014 Arkansas Razorbacks baseball team represented the University of Arkansas in baseball at the Division I level in the NCAA for the 2014 season. Dave van Horn was the coach and completed his twelfth year at his alma mater. Van Horn's Hogs won 40 games for the seventh time in his tenure.

== Personnel ==
=== Roster ===
2014 Arkansas Razorbacks roster
| Pitchers: 13 – Michael Gunn – Junior; 15 – Colin Poché – Sophomore; 21 – Trey Killian – Sophomore; 25 – Dominic Taccolini – Freshman; 26 – Austin Kerns – Freshman; 27 – Henry Weiler – Freshman; 28 – James Teague – Freshman; 30 – Jacob Stone – Junior; 32 – Zach Jackson – Freshman; 34 – Parker Sanburn – Freshman; 35 – Jackson Lowery – RS Junior; 37 – Chris Falwell – Freshman; 38 – Andrew Kelley – Freshman; 39 – Chris Oliver – Junior; 40 – Lance Phillips – Junior; 45 – Landon Simpson – RS Sophomore; 47 – Lawson Vassar – Freshman; 49 – Jalen Beeks – Junior; 51 – Zach Barr – Junior; 53 – Jake Smith – Freshman; 55 – Alex Phillips – Freshman | Catchers: 19 – Jake Wise – Senior; 20 – Carson Shaddy – Freshman; 24 – Blake Baxendale – RS Freshman; 33 – Krisjon Wilkerson – Junior; 44 – Alex Gosser – Freshman; Infielders: 1 – Brian Anderson – Junior; 3 – Michael Bernal – RS Sophomore; 5 – Brett McAfee – Junior; 7 – Bobby Wernes – Sophomore; 14 – Josh Alberius – RS Freshman; 18 – Matt Brown – Freshman; 29 – Eric Fisher – RS Junior; 41 – Dominic Todarello – Freshman; 10- Cameron Piggot | Outfielders: 8 Tyler Spoon – RS Sophomore; 9 Clark Eagan – Freshman; 10 Joe Serrano – Junior; 12 Garrett Rucker – RS Freshman; 16 Andrew Benintendi – Freshman |

=== Coaches ===
2014 Arkansas Razorbacks baseball coaching staff
- 2 Dave van Horn – Head coach
- 22 Tony Vitello – Hitting Coach
- 31 Dave Jorn – Pitching Coach
- – Clay Goodwin – Director of Baseball Operations
- 17 Brad Flanders – Volunteer assistant coach
- 6 Tim Carver – Student assistant coach

== Schedule ==
2014 Arkansas Razorbacks baseball game log
Regular season

February
| Date | Opponent | Site/stadium | Score | Win | Loss | Save | Attendance | Overall record | SEC record |
|---|---|---|---|---|---|---|---|---|---|
| Feb 14 | Appalachian State | Baum Stadium • Fayetteville, AR | 12–2 | Beeks (1–0) | Nunn (0–1) | None | 7,203 | 1–0 | |
| Feb 15 | Appalachian State | Baum Stadium • Fayetteville, AR | 7–6 | Oliver (1–0) | Moore (0–1) | Gunn (1) | 8,074 | 2–0 | |
| Feb 16 | Appalachian State | Baum Stadium • Fayetteville, AR | 8–3 | Stone (1–0) | Smith (0–1) | None | 8,102 | 3–0 | |
| Feb 21 | Eastern Illinois | Baum Stadium • Fayetteville, AR | 6–2 | Beeks (2–0) | Johansmeier (1–1) | None | 6,921 | 4–0 | |
| Feb 22 | Eastern Illinois | Baum Stadium • Fayetteville, AR | 8–3 | Borens (1–0) | Greenfield (0–1) | None | 8,094 | 5–0 | |
| Feb 23 | Eastern Illinois | Baum Stadium • Fayetteville, AR | 8–3 | Stone (2–0) | Stenger (0–2) | None | 6,968 | 6–0 | |
| Feb 28 | South Alabama | Baum Stadium • Fayetteville, AR | 12–1 | Beeks (3–0) | Bell (1–1) | None | 6,833 | 7–0 | |

March
| Date | Opponent | Site/stadium | Score | Win | Loss | Save | Attendance | Overall record | SEC record |
|---|---|---|---|---|---|---|---|---|---|
| Mar 1 | South Alabama | Baum Stadium • Fayetteville, AR | 1–2 | St. John (1–0) | Oliver (1–1) | Hallford (2) | | 7–1 | |
| Mar 1 | South Alabama | Baum Stadium • Fayetteville, AR | 3–5 | Hill (1–1) | Killian (0–1) | Hallford (3) | 7,842 | 7–2 | |
| Mar 3 | IPFW | Baum Stadium • Fayetteville, AR | Cancelled | | | | | | |
| Mar 7 | vs. San Francisco | Evans Diamond • Berkeley, CA | 1–2 | Bobb (2–1) | Beeks (3–1) | Hibberd (1) | 218 | 7–3 | |
| Mar 8 | vs. Tulane | Evans Diamond • Berkeley, CA | 4–0 | Jackson (1–0) | LeBlanc (2–1) | Stone (1) | 323 | 8–3 | |
| Mar 9 | @ California | Evans Diamond • Berkeley, CA | 3–4 | Porter (2–0) | Oliver (1–2) | Hildenberger (4) | 626 | 8–4 | |
| Mar 9 | @ California | Evans Diamond • Berkeley, CA | 1–2 | Siomkin (1–0) | Killian (0–2) | None | 759 | 8–5 | |
| Mar 14 | @ Florida | Alfred A. McKethan Stadium • Gainesville, FL | 1–2 | Shore (1–1) | Beeks (3–2) | Rhodes (2) | 3,120 | 8–6 | 0–1 |
| Mar 15 | @ Florida | Alfred A. McKethan Stadium • Gainesville, FL | 0–1 | Hanhold (3–1) | Killian (0–3) | Harris (3) | 3,557 | 8–7 | 0–2 |
| Mar 16 | @ Florida | Alfred A. McKethan Stadium • Gainesville, FL | 9–3 | Stone (3–0) | Puk (1–2) | Gunn (2) | 3,178 | 9–7 | 1–2 |
| Mar 18 | Grambling State | Baum Stadium • Fayetteville, AR | 4–3 | Poche (1–0) | O'Bear (0–2) | Jackson (1) | 7,110 | 10–7 | |
| Mar 19 | Grambling State | Baum Stadium • Fayetteville, AR | 8–0 | Phillips (1–0) | Baker (0–3) | None | 7,034 | 11–7 | |
| Mar 21 | #28 Alabama | Baum Stadium • Fayetteville, AR | 9–17 | Shaw (1–1) | Jackson (1–1) | None | 8,112 | 11–8 | 1–3 |
| Mar 22 | #28 Alabama | Baum Stadium • Fayetteville, AR | 2–1 | Killian (1–3) | Burrows (3–1) | None | 9,036 | 12–8 | 2–3 |
| Mar 23 | #28 Alabama | Baum Stadium • Fayetteville, AR | 1–0 | Oliver (2–2) | Keller (4–1) | Gunn (3) | 7,967 | 13–8 | 3–3 |
| Mar 25 | Mississippi Valley State | Baum Stadium • Fayetteville, AR | 6–0 | Poche (2–0) | Thomas (0–3) | None | DH | 14–8 | |
| Mar 25 | Mississippi Valley State | Baum Stadium • Fayetteville, AR | 12–1 | Teague (1–0) | Sheppard (1–7) | None | 7,412 | 15–8 | |
| Mar 26 | @ Mississippi Valley State | Dickey-Stephens Park • North Little Rock, Arkansas | 3–0 | Phillips (2–0) | Parker (0–4) | Gunn (4) | 8,867 | 16–8 | |
| Mar 29 | @ Mississippi State | Dudy Noble Field • Starkville, MS | 4–0 | Beeks (4–2) | Brown (3–1) | None | DH | 17–8 | 4–3 |
| Mar 29 | @ Mississippi State | Dudy Noble Field • Starkville, MS | 1–5 | Mitchell (5–1) | Killian (1–4) | None | 9,213 | 17–9 | 4–4 |
| Mar 30 | @ Mississippi State | Dudy Noble Field • Starkville, MS | 1–5 | Lindgren (4–0) | Oliver (2–3) | Holder (4) | 7,756 | 17–10 | 4–5 |

April
| Date | Opponent | Site/stadium | Score | Win | Loss | Save | Attendance | Overall record | SEC record |
|---|---|---|---|---|---|---|---|---|---|
| Apr 1 | Nebraska | Baum Stadium • Fayetteville, AR | 4–3 | Jackson (1–1) | Hohensee (0–3) | Gunn (5) | 7,571 | 18–10 | |
| Apr 2 | Nebraska | Baum Stadium • Fayetteville, AR | 4–6 | Kubat (2–1) | Lowery (0–1) | Roeder (5) | 7,357 | 18–11 | |
| Apr 4 | South Carolina | Baum Stadium • Fayetteville, AR | 1–2 | Montgomery (4–2) | Killian (1–5) | Seddon (8) | DH | 18–12 | 4–6 |
| Apr 4 | South Carolina | Baum Stadium • Fayetteville, AR | 4–1 | Beeks (5–2) | Wynkoop (5–2) | None | 9,947 | 19–12 | 5–6 |
| Apr 5 | South Carolina | Baum Stadium • Fayetteville, AR | 7–0 | Oliver (3–3) | Crowe (6–1) | None | 10,103 | 20–12 | 6–6 |
| Apr 8 | UNLV | Baum Stadium • Fayetteville, AR | 7–10 | Oakley (3–2) | Simpson (0–1) | None | 7,234 | 20–13 | |
| Apr 9 | UNLV | Baum Stadium • Fayetteville, AR | 9–2 | Phillips (3–0) | Roper (1–1) | None | 7,621 | 21–13 | |
| Apr 11 | @ LSU | Alex Box Stadium • Baton Rouge, LA | 3–5 | Nola (7–1) | Killian (1–6) | Broussard (8) | 7,034 | 21–14 | 6–7 |
| Apr 12 | @ LSU | Alex Box Stadium • Baton Rouge, LA | 4–5 | Broussard (1–0) | Gunn (1–1) | None | 5,431 | 21–15 | 6–8 |
| Apr 13 | @ LSU | Alex Box Stadium • Baton Rouge, LA | 10–4 | Oliver (4–3) | Bourman (3–2) | None | 10,695 | 22–15 | 7–8 |
| Apr 15 | Stephen F. Austin | Baum Stadium • Fayetteville, AR | 7–2 | Poche (3–0) | Maynard (0–2) | None | 7,124 | 23–15 | |
| Apr 18 | Vanderbilt | Baum Stadium • Fayetteville, AR | 6–2 | Killian (2–6) | Beede (5–5) | None | 9,044 | 24–15 | 8–8 |
| Apr 19 | Vanderbilt | Baum Stadium • Fayetteville, AR | 1–2 | Fulmer (1–1) | Beeks (5–3) | Miller (3) | 9,578 | 24–16 | 8–9 |
| Apr 20 | Vanderbilt | Baum Stadium • Fayetteville, AR | 3–1 | Oliver (5–3) | Ferguson (5–3) | Gunn (6) | 8,126 | 25–16 | 9–9 |
| Apr 22 | Northwestern State | Baum Stadium • Fayetteville, AR | 8–1 | Lowery (1–1) | Smith (0–2) | None | 7,368 | 26–16 | |
| Apr 23 | Northwestern State | Baum Stadium • Fayetteville, AR | 15–3 | Taccolini (1–0) | Bear (0–2) | None | 7,455 | 27–16 | |
| Apr 25 | Auburn | Baum Stadium • Fayetteville, AR | 1–2 | Ortman (8–2) | Killian (2–7) | Dedrick (3) | 10,087 | 27–17 | 9–10 |
| Apr 26 | Auburn | Baum Stadium • Fayetteville, AR | 4–3 | Gunn (2–0) | Dedrick (1–2) | None | DH | 28–17 | 10–10 |
| Apr 26 | Auburn | Baum Stadium • Fayetteville, AR | 2–7 | O'Neal (3–4) | Oliver (5–4) | None | 11,742 | 28–18 | 10–11 |
| Apr 29 | @ Missouri State | Hammons Field • Springfield, MO | 4–1 | Taccolini (2–0) | Cheray (1–1) | Gunn (7) | 525 | 29–18 | |

May
| Date | Opponent | Site/stadium | Score | Win | Loss | Save | Attendance | Overall record | SEC record |
|---|---|---|---|---|---|---|---|---|---|
| May 2 | @ Ole Miss | Swayze Field • Oxford, MO | 2–3 | Ellis (7–0) | Killian (2–8) | Greenwood (2) | 9,224 | 29–19 | 10–12 |
| May 3 | @ Ole Miss | Swayze Field • Oxford, MS | 4–7 | Trent (7–0) | Beeks (5–4) | Laxer (5) | 9,416 | 29–20 | 10–13 |
| May 4 | @ Ole Miss | Swayze Field • Oxford, MS | 11–1 | Oliver (6–4) | Smith (5–4) | None | 7,121 | 30–20 | 11–13 |
| May 9 | Texas A&M | Baum Stadium • Fayetteville, AR | 3–2 | Gunn (3–1) | Vinson (2–2) | None | 9,428 | 31–20 | 12–13 |
| May 10 | Texas A&M | Baum Stadium • Fayetteville, AR | 7–3 | Stone (4–0) | Kent (2–1) | None | 9,988 | 32–20 | 13–13 |
| May 11 | Texas A&M | Baum Stadium • Fayetteville, AR | 5–6 | Vinson (3–2) | Gunn (3–2) | Minter (1) | 5,126 | 32–21 | 13–14 |
| May 15 | @ Missouri | Taylor Stadium • Columbia, MO | 9–4 | Killian (3–8) | Graves (3–6) | None | 725 | 33–21 | 14–14 |
| May 16 | @ Missouri | Taylor Stadium • Columbia, MO | 4–0 | Oliver (7–4) | Fairbanks (4–7) | None | 758 | 34–21 | 15–14 |
| May 17 | @ Missouri | Taylor Stadium • Columbia, MO | 7–5 | Simpson (1–1) | Schwaab (1–1) | None | 765 | 35–21 | 16–14 |

Postseason

SEC Tournament
| Date | Opponent | Site/stadium | Score | Win | Loss | Save | Attendance | Overall record | SECT Record |
|---|---|---|---|---|---|---|---|---|---|
| May 20 | Texas A&M | Hoover Metropolitan Stadium • Hoover, AL | 4–0 | Killian (4–8) | Mengden (4–8) | Jackson (2) | 2,935 | 36–21 | 1–0 |
| May 21 | Ole Miss | Hoover Metropolitan Stadium • Hoover, AL | 2–1 | Oliver (8–4) | Ellis (7–1) | None | N/A | 37–21 | 2–0 |
| May 22 | LSU | Hoover Metropolitan Stadium • Hoover, AL | 2–7 | Nola (10–1) | Poche (3–1) | None | N/A | 37–22 | 2–1 |
| May 23 | Ole Miss | Hoover Metropolitan Stadium • Hoover, AL | 8–7 | Gunn (4–2) | Short (3–3) | Stone (3) | N/A | 38–22 | 3–1 |
| May 24 | LSU | Hoover Metropolitan Stadium • Hoover, AL | 1–11 | Bouman (5–2) | Jackson (2–2) | None | N/A | 38–23 | 3–2 |

NCAA tournament: Charlottesville Regional
| Date | Opponent | Site/stadium | Score | Win | Loss | Save | Attendance | Overall record | NCAAT record |
|---|---|---|---|---|---|---|---|---|---|
| May 30 | vs. (3) Liberty | Davenport Field • Charlottesville, VA | 3–2 | Oliver (9–4) | Lambert (11–3) | Stone (4) | 3,334 | 39–23 | 1–0 |
| May 31 | vs. (1)Virginia | Davenport Field • Charlottesville, VA | 0–3 | Kirby (9–1) | Killian (4–9) | Howard (19) | 4,579 | 39–24 | 1–1 |
| June 1 | vs. (4) Bucknell | Davenport Field • Charlottesville, VA | 10–0 | Beeks (6–4) | Andrychik (5–5) | None | 3,121 | 40–24 | 2–1 |
| June 1 | vs. (1) Virginia | Davenport Field • Charlottesville, VA | 2–9 | Waddell (8–3) | Jackson (2–2) | None | 4,005 | 40–25 | 2–2 |

== Record vs. conference opponents ==
Last two do not qualify for conf. tourn. Blank are not scheduled. Blue are home games, otherwise away.

2014 SEC baseball records Source: 2014 SEC baseball game results
| Team | W–L | ALA | ARK | AUB | FLA | UGA | KEN | LSU | MSU | MIZZ | MISS | SCAR | TENN | TAMU | VAN | Team | Div | SR | SW |
|---|---|---|---|---|---|---|---|---|---|---|---|---|---|---|---|---|---|---|---|
| ALA | 15–14 | | 1–2 | 2–1 | 0–3 | . | 2–1 | 1–1 | 1–2 | . | 3–0 | 1–2 | 2–1 | 2–1 | . | ALA | W5 | 5–4 | 1–1 |
| ARK | 16–14 | 2–1 | | 1–2 | 1–2 | . | . | 1–2 | 1–2 | 3–0 | 1–2 | 2–1 | . | 2–1 | 2–1 | ARK | W4 | 5–5 | 1–0 |
| AUB | 10–20 | 1–2 | 2–1 | | . | . | 1–2 | 0–3 | 0–3 | 1–2 | 0–3 | 1–2 | 2–1 | 2–1 | . | AUB | W7 | 3–7 | 0–3 |
| FLA | 21–9 | 3–0 | 2–1 | . | | 3–0 | 1–2 | 3–0 | . | 3–0 | . | 2–1 | 2–1 | 1–2 | 1–2 | FLA | E1 | 7–3 | 4–0 |
| UGA | 11–18 | . | . | . | 0–3 | | 1–2 | 0–2 | 1–2 | 2–1 | 1–2 | 2–1 | 2–1 | 2–1 | 0–3 | UGA | E6 | 4–6 | 0–2 |
| KEN | 14–16 | 1–2 | . | 2–1 | 2–1 | 2–1 | | . | . | 1–2 | 0–3 | 2–1 | 1–2 | 2–1 | 1–2 | KEN | E4 | 5–5 | 0–1 |
| LSU | 17–11 | 1–1 | 2–1 | 3–0 | 0–3 | 2–0 | . | | 3–0 | . | 2–1 | . | 2–1 | 1–2 | 1–2 | LSU | W2 | 6–3 | 2–1 |
| MSU | 18–12 | 2–1 | 2–1 | 3–0 | . | 2–1 | . | 0–3 | | 3–0 | 1–2 | . | 2–1 | 1–2 | 2–1 | MSU | W3 | 7–3 | 2–1 |
| MIZZ | 6–24 | . | 0–3 | 2–1 | 0–3 | 1–2 | 2–1 | . | 0–3 | | 0–3 | 0–3 | 1–2 | . | 0–3 | MIZZ | E7 | 2–8 | 0–6 |
| MISS | 19–11 | 0–3 | 2–1 | 3–0 | . | 2–1 | 3–0 | 1–2 | 2–1 | 3–0 | | 1–2 | . | 2–1 | . | MISS | W1 | 7–3 | 3–1 |
| SCAR | 18–12 | 2–1 | 1–2 | 2–1 | 1–2 | 1–2 | 1–2 | . | . | 3–0 | 2–1 | | 3–0 | . | 2–1 | SCAR | E2 | 6–4 | 2–0 |
| TENN | 12–18 | 1–2 | . | 1–2 | 1–2 | 1–2 | 2–1 | 1–2 | 1–2 | 2–1 | . | 0–3 | | . | 2–1 | TENN | E5 | 3–7 | 0–1 |
| TAMU | 14–16 | 1–2 | 1–2 | 1–2 | 2–1 | 1–2 | 1–2 | 2–1 | 2–1 | . | 1–2 | . | . | | 2–1 | TAMU | W6 | 4–6 | 0–0 |
| VAN | 17–13 | . | 1–2 | . | 2–1 | 3–0 | 2–1 | 2–1 | 1–2 | 3–0 | . | 1–2 | 1–2 | 1–2 | | VAN | E3 | 5–5 | 2–0 |
| Team | W–L | ALA | ARK | AUB | FLA | UGA | KEN | LSU | MSU | MIZZ | MISS | SCAR | TENN | TAMU | VAN | Team | Div | SR | SW |

Updated for entire regular season. Georgia at LSU had a tie game.
