= 2014 South Carolina Gamecocks baseball team =

American college baseball season

2014 South Carolina Gamecocks baseball

Columbia Regional, 2-2
- Conference: Southeastern Conference

Ranking
- Coaches: No. 22
- CB: No. 25
- Record: 44–18 (18–12 SEC)
- Head coach: Chad Holbrook (2nd season)
- Assistant coaches: Jerry Meyers (4th/12th season); Sammy Esposito (7th season)
- Home stadium: Carolina Stadium

2014 Southeastern Conference baseball standings
	Conf.						Overall
Team	W		L		T	PCT	W		L		T	PCT
Eastern
No. 24 Florida ^{x}‍†‍‍^{y}	21	–	9	–	0	.700	40	–	23	–	0	.635
No. 25 South Carolina ‍‍‍^{y}	18	–	12	–	0	.600	44	–	18	–	0	.710
No. 1 Vanderbilt ‍‍‍^{y}	17	–	13	–	0	.567	51	–	21	–	0	.708
Kentucky ‍‍‍^{y}	14	–	16	–	0	.467	37	–	25	–	0	.597
Tennessee ‍‍‍	12	–	18	–	0	.400	31	–	23	–	0	.574
Georgia ‍‍‍	11	–	18	–	1	.383	26	–	29	–	1	.473
Missouri ‍‍‍	6	–	24	–	0	.200	20	–	33	–	0	.377
Western
No. 4 Ole Miss ^{x}‍‍‍^{y}	19	–	11	–	0	.633	48	–	21	–	0	.696
No. 21 LSU ‍‍‡‍^{y}	17	–	11	–	1	.603	46	–	16	–	1	.738
No. 28 Mississippi State ‍‍‍^{y}	18	–	12	–	0	.600	39	–	24	–	0	.619
No. 30 Arkansas ‍‍‍^{y}	16	–	14	–	0	.533	40	–	25	–	0	.615
Alabama ‍‍‍^{y}	15	–	14	–	0	.517	37	–	24	–	0	.607
Texas A&M ‍‍‍^{y}	14	–	16	–	0	.467	36	–	26	–	0	.581
Auburn ‍‍‍	10	–	20	–	0	.333	28	–	28	–	0	.500
x – Division champion † – Conference champion ‡ – Tournament champion y – Invited to the NCAA tournament Rankings from Collegiate Baseball

The 2014 South Carolina Gamecocks baseball team represented the University of South Carolina in the 2014 NCAA Division I baseball season. The Gamecocks played their home games in Carolina Stadium. The team was coached by Chad Holbrook, who was in his second season as head coach at Carolina.

== Personnel ==
=== Roster ===
2014 South Carolina Gamecocks roster
Pitchers: 6 Joel Seddon - Junior; 13 Jack Wynkoop - Sophomore; 14 Evan Beal - Junior; 17 Taylor Widener - Freshman; 18 Tyler Haswell - Freshman; 23 Vince Fiori - Sophomore; 26 Matthew Vogel - Freshman; 28 John Parke - Freshman; 32 Canaan Cropper - Freshman; 34 Jordan Montgomery - Junior; 35 Curt Britt - Sophomore; 36 Hunter Privette - Senior; 37 Wil Crowe - Freshman; 39 Reed Scott - Freshman; 42 Cody Mincey - Junior; 46 Jackson Smith - Freshman; 47 Josh Reagan - Freshman; 54 Trey McNickle - Junior	Infielders: 7 DC Arendas - Sophomore; 8 Marcus Mooney - Sophomore; 9 Joey Pankake - Junior; 15 Jordan Gore - Freshman; 22 Max Schrock - Sophomore; 24 Brison Celek - Senior; 31 Weber Pike - Freshman; 33 Kyle Martin - Junior	Catchers: 5 Patrick Harrington - Junior; 16 Logan Koch - Freshman; 21 Grayson Greiner - Junior; Outfielders: 3 Tanner English - Junior; 4 Connor Bright - Junior; 11 Zack Madden - Freshman; 19 Gene Cone - Freshman; 20 Brock Maxwell - Freshman; 30 Elliot Caldwell - Junior

2014 South Carolina Gamecocks Baseball Roster & Bios http://gamecocksonline.cstv.com/sports/m-basebl/mtt/scar-m-basebl-mtt.html>

=== Coaching staff ===
2014 South Carolina Gamecocks baseball coaching staff
- 2 Chad Holbrook – Head coach – 2 years
- 12 Jerry Meyers - Associate head coach - 4 years / 12 years
- 41 Sammy Esposito - Assistant coach - 7 years
- 55 Brian Buscher - Volunteer assistant coach - 2 years

2014 South Carolina Gamecocks Baseball Coaches & Bios http://gamecocksonline.cstv.com/sports/m-basebl/mtt/scar-m-basebl-mtt.html#coaches

== Schedule ==
2014 South Carolina Gamecocks baseball game log
Regular season
February

#	Date	Opponent	Site/stadium	Score	Win	Loss	Save	Attendance	Overall record	SEC record
–	February 14	Bucknell	Carolina Stadium	Postponed						
1	February 15	Bucknell	Carolina Stadium	17-4	Montgomery (1-0)	Hough (0-1)	None	8,015	1–0	–
2	February 15	Bucknell	Carolina Stadium	12-2	Wynkoop (1-0)	Weigel (0-1)	None	7,822	2–0	–
3	February 16	Bucknell	Carolina Stadium	12-0	Crowe (1-0)	Andreychik (0-1)	None	7,512	3–0	–
4	February 18	Presbyterian	Carolina Stadium	4-0	Reagan (1-0)	Kehner (0-1)	None	6,642	4–0	–
5	February 21	Eastern Kentucky	Carolina Stadium	4-0	Montgomery (2-0)	Cobb (1-1)	None	6,842	5–0	–
6	February 22	Eastern Kentucky	Carolina Stadium	2-0	Wynkoop (2-0)	Perkins (0-1)	Seddon (1)	8,242	6–0	–
7	February 23	Eastern Kentucky	Carolina Stadium	6-0	Crowe (2-0)	Scott (0-2)	None	7,731	7–0	–
8	February 28	Clemson	Carolina Stadium	9-6	Mincey (1-0)	Bates (0-1)	Seddon (2)	8,242	8–0	–

March

#	Date	Opponent	Site/stadium	Score	Win	Loss	Save	Attendance	Overall record	SEC record
9	March 1	vs. Clemson	Fluor Field	10-2	Wynkoop (3-0)	Crownover (2-1)	Seddon (3)	7,182	9–0	–
10	March 2	@ Clemson	Doug Kingsmore Stadium	5-3	Mincey (2-0)	Schmidt (1-2)	None	6,016	10–0	–
11	March 4	Stetson	Carolina Stadium	7-1	Reagan (2-0)	Powers (1-2)	None	6,306	11–0	–
12	March 5	Stetson	Carolina Stadium	4-2	Privette (1-0)	Warmoth (0-2)	Seddon (4)	6,427	12–0	–
-	March 7	Brown	Carolina Stadium	Postponed						
13	March 8	Brown	Carolina Stadium	13-0	Montgomery (3-0)	Galan (0-1)	None	7,163	13–0	–
14	March 8	Brown	Carolina Stadium	8-0	Wynkoop (4-0)	St. Lawrence (0-1)	None	7,546	14–0	–
15	March 9	Brown	Carolina Stadium	1-0	Crowe (3-0)	Taugner (0-1)	Seddon (5)	6,903	15–0	–
16	March 11	Furman	Carolina Stadium	5-0	Widener (1-0)	Greenfield (1-1)	None	7,174	16–0	–
17	March 14	Ole Miss	Carolina Stadium	4-6	Ellis (3-0)	Montgomery (3-1)	Laxer (1)	7,859	16–1	0–1
18	March 15	Ole Miss	Carolina Stadium	5-4^{10}	Seddon (1-0)	Denny (0-1)	None	7,835	17–1	1–1
19	March 15	Ole Miss	Carolina Stadium	3-1	Crowe (4-0)	Smith (3-1)	Seddon (6)	7,349	18–1	2–1
-	March 18	@ The Citadel	Joseph P. Riley Jr. Park	Postponed						
20	March 21	@ Kentucky	Cliff Hagan Stadium	5-13	Reed (4-1)	Montgomery (3-2)	None	1,937	18–2	2–2
21	March 22	@ Kentucky	Cliff Hagan Stadium	1-2	Shepherd (5-0)	Wynkoop (4-1)	Salow (1)	2,220	18–3	2–3
22	March 23	@ Kentucky	Cliff Hagan Stadium	8-3	Crowe (5-0)	Nelson (1-1)	Seddon (7)	1,870	19–3	3–3
23	March 25	College of Charleston	Carolina Stadium	4-2	Reagan (3-0)	Thornton (0-2)	Mincey (1)	7,170	20–3	–
24	March 26	Coastal Carolina	Carolina Stadium	4-0	Britt (1-0)	Moats (0-3)	None	6,982	21–3	–
25	March 28	Tennessee	Carolina Stadium	3-2^{14}	Wynkoop (5-1)	Bettencourt (0-1)	None	7,506	22–3	4–3
26	March 29	Tennessee	Carolina Stadium	9-6	Scott (1-0)	Owenby (2-1)	None	7,473	23–3	5–3
27	March 30	Tennessee	Carolina Stadium	8-0	Crowe (6-0)	Lee (3-1)	None	8,242	24–3	6–3

April

#	Date	Opponent	Site/stadium	Score	Win	Loss	Save	Attendance	Overall record	SEC record
28	April 1	Appalachian State	Carolina Stadium	2-1	Fiori (1-0)	Thurber (0-3)	None	7,416	25–3	–
-	April 3	@ Arkansas	Baum Stadium	Postponed						
29	April 4	@ Arkansas	Baum Stadium	2-1	Montgomery (4-2)	Killian (1-5)	Seddon (8)	9,947	26–3	7–3
30	April 4	@ Arkansas	Baum Stadium	1-4	Beeks (5-2)	Wynkoop (5-2)	None	9,947	26–4	7–4
31	April 5	@ Arkansas	Baum Stadium	0-7	Oliver (3-3)	Crowe (6-1)	None	10,103	26–5	7–5
32	April 8	@ Furman	Fluor Field	9-2	Widener (2-0)	Dittmar (0-2)	None	4,247	27–5	–
33	April 11	Florida	Carolina Stadium	4-1	Montgomery (5-2)	Shore (3-2)	Seddon (9)	8,242	28–5	8–5
34	April 12	Florida	Carolina Stadium	3-4	Puk (3-2)	Seddon (1-1)	None	8,242	28–6	8–6
35	April 13	Florida	Carolina Stadium	5-6	Dunning (1-0)	Crowe (6-2)	Hanhold (2)	8,242	28–7	8–7
36	April 15	Charleston Southern	Carolina Stadium	1-4	Buckley (2-0)	Beal (0-1)	Weekley (7)	7,415	28–8	–
37	April 16	@ The Citadel	Joseph P. Riley Jr. Park	8-10	Livingston (2-4)	Vogel (0-1)	Hunter (7)	6,500	28–9	–
-	April 18	@ Auburn	Plainsman Park	Postponed						
38	April 19	@ Auburn	Plainsman Park	2-4	Ortman (7-2)	Montgomery (5-3)	None	3,770	28–10	8–8
39	April 19	@ Auburn	Plainsman Park	3-2	Mincey (3-0)	Wade (3-2)	Seddon (10)	4,096	29–10	9–8
40	April 20	@ Auburn	Plainsman Park	4-3	Seddon (2-1)	Cochran-Gill (0-2)	None	3,084	30–10	10–8
41	April 22	Davidson	Carolina Stadium	8-0	Widener (3-0)	Beeker (2-2)	None	6,886	31–10	–
42	April 23	USC Upstate	Carolina Stadium	6-1	Britt (2-0)	Birklund (0-7)	None	7,102	32–10	–
43	April 25	Alabama	Carolina Stadium	9-3	Montgomery (6-3)	Turnbull (5-3)	Seddon (11)	8,242	33–10	11–8
44	April 26	Alabama	Carolina Stadium	1-2	Kamplain (4-2)	Wynkoop (5-3)	Burrows (9)	8,242	33–11	11–9
45	April 27	Alabama	Carolina Stadium	9-3	Mincey (4-0)	Eicholtz (2-1)	Seddon (12)	8,074	34–11	12–9

May

#	Date	Opponent	Site/stadium	Score	Win	Loss	Save	Attendance	Overall record	SEC record
46	May 2	@ Georgia	Foley Field	1-3	Lawlor (4-4)	Montgomery (6-4)	None	2,682	34–12	12–10
47	May 3	@ Georgia	Foley Field	5-2	Wynkoop (6-3)	Ripple (2-1)	Seddon (13)	3,256	35–12	13–10
48	May 4	@ Georgia	Foley Field	3-5	Sosebee (1-3)	Crowe (6-3)	Cheek (1)	3,078	35–13	13–11
49	May 7	Wofford	Carolina Stadium	15-1	Britt (3-0)	Accetta (3-3)	None	7,274	36–13	–
50	May 9	Missouri	Carolina Stadium	8-2	Montgomery (7-4)	Graves (3-5)	None	7,419	37–13	14–11
51	May 10	Missouri	Carolina Stadium	3-1	Wynkoop (7-3)	Fairbanks (4-6)	Seddon (14)	7,903	38–13	15–11
52	May 11	Missouri	Carolina Stadium	2-1	Mincey (5-0)	Steele (0-8)	None	7,307	39–13	16–11
53	May 13	The Citadel	Carolina Stadium	10-1	Scott (2-0)	Brecklin (0-1)	None	8,054	40–13	–
54	May 15	@ Vanderbilt	Hawkins Field	4-3^{10}	Seddon (3-1)	Miller (1-1)	None	2,819	41–13	17–11
55	May 16	@ Vanderbilt	Hawkins Field	3-9	Fulmer (5-1)	Wynkoop (7-4)	Stone (3)	3,429	41–14	17–12
56	May 17	@ Vanderbilt	Hawkins Field	6-3	Crowe (7-3)	Ravenelle (3-1)	Seddon (15)	3,626	42–14	18–12

Postseason
SEC Tournament

#	Date	Opponent	Site/stadium	Score	Win	Loss	Save	Attendance	Overall record	SECT record
57	May 21	Mississippi State	Hoover Metropolitan Stadium	0-12^{7}	Lindgren (6-1)	Montgomery (7-5)	None	7,526	42–15	0–1
58	May 22	Florida	Hoover Metropolitan Stadium	2-7	Poyner (5-3)	Wynkoop (7-5)	None	5,115	42–16	0–2

NCAA tournament: Columbia Regional

#	Date	Opponent	Site/stadium	Score	Win	Loss	Save	Attendance	Overall record	NCAAT record
59	May 30	Campbell	Carolina Stadium	5-2	Montgomery (8-5)	Bowers (10-4)	None	7,382	43–16	1–0
60	May 31	Maryland	Carolina Stadium	3-4	Shawaryn (11-3)	Wynkoop (7-6)	Mooney (12)	6,813	43–17	1–1
61	June 1	Campbell	Carolina Stadium	9-0	Crowe (8-3)	Koopman (8-2)	None	5,986	44–17	2–1
62	June 1	Maryland	Carolina Stadium	10-1	Stiles (5-2)	Seddon (3-2)	Ruse (1)	6,340	44–18	2–2

2014 South Carolina Gamecocks Baseball Schedule http://gamecocksonline.cstv.com/sports/m-basebl/sched/scar-m-basebl-sched.html>

== Honors and awards ==
- Wil Crowe was named SEC Pitcher of the Week on February 18, SEC Freshman of the Week on February 25, and Collegiate Baseball Freshman All-American.
- Tanner English was named Second-Team All-SEC.
- Grayson Greiner was named SEC Player of the Week on March 31, SEC All-Defensive Team, Baseball America Second-Team All-American, and Johnny Bench Award semifinalist.
- Joey Pankake was named to the SEC All-Defensive Team.
- Joel Seddon was named Second-Team All-SEC. and NCBWA Second-Team All-American.

== Record vs. conference opponents ==
Last two do not qualify for conf. tourn. Blank are not scheduled. Blue are home games, otherwise away.

2014 SEC baseball records Source: 2014 SEC baseball game results
Team	W–L	ALA	ARK	AUB	FLA	UGA	KEN	LSU	MSU	MIZZ	MISS	SCAR	TENN	TAMU	VAN	Team	Div	SR	SW
ALA	15–14		1–2	2–1	0–3	.	2–1	1–1	1–2	.	3–0	1–2	2–1	2–1	.	ALA	W5	5–4	1–1
ARK	16–14	2–1		1–2	1–2	.	.	1–2	1–2	3–0	1–2	2–1	.	2–1	2–1	ARK	W4	5–5	1–0
AUB	10–20	1–2	2–1		.	.	1–2	0–3	0–3	1–2	0–3	1–2	2–1	2–1	.	AUB	W7	3–7	0–3
FLA	21–9	3–0	2–1	.		3–0	1–2	3–0	.	3–0	.	2–1	2–1	1–2	1–2	FLA	E1	7–3	4–0
UGA	11–18	.	.	.	0–3		1–2	0–2	1–2	2–1	1–2	2–1	2–1	2–1	0–3	UGA	E6	4–6	0–2
KEN	14–16	1–2	.	2–1	2–1	2–1		.	.	1–2	0–3	2–1	1–2	2–1	1–2	KEN	E4	5–5	0–1
LSU	17–11	1–1	2–1	3–0	0–3	2–0	.		3–0	.	2–1	.	2–1	1–2	1–2	LSU	W2	6–3	2–1
MSU	18–12	2–1	2–1	3–0	.	2–1	.	0–3		3–0	1–2	.	2–1	1–2	2–1	MSU	W3	7–3	2–1
MIZZ	6–24	.	0–3	2–1	0–3	1–2	2–1	.	0–3		0–3	0–3	1–2	.	0–3	MIZZ	E7	2–8	0–6
MISS	19–11	0–3	2–1	3–0	.	2–1	3–0	1–2	2–1	3–0		1–2	.	2–1	.	MISS	W1	7–3	3–1
SCAR	18–12	2–1	1–2	2–1	1–2	1–2	1–2	.	.	3–0	2–1		3–0	.	2–1	SCAR	E2	6–4	2–0
TENN	12–18	1–2	.	1–2	1–2	1–2	2–1	1–2	1–2	2–1	.	0–3		.	2–1	TENN	E5	3–7	0–1
TAMU	14–16	1–2	1–2	1–2	2–1	1–2	1–2	2–1	2–1	.	1–2	.	.		2–1	TAMU	W6	4–6	0–0
VAN	17–13	.	1–2	.	2–1	3–0	2–1	2–1	1–2	3–0	.	1–2	1–2	1–2		VAN	E3	5–5	2–0
Team	W–L	ALA	ARK	AUB	FLA	UGA	KEN	LSU	MSU	MIZZ	MISS	SCAR	TENN	TAMU	VAN	Team	Div	SR	SW

Updated for entire regular season. Georgia at LSU had a tie game.

== Rankings ==
Ranking movements Legend: ██ Increase in ranking ██ Decrease in ranking — = Not ranked
	Week																		
Poll	Pre	1	2	3	4	5	6	7	8	9	10	11	12	13	14	15	16	17	Final
Coaches'	14	14*	14*	1	1	2	3	3	4	6	8	7	11	8	6	13	—		
Baseball America	7	5	3	3	1	1	2	2	5	11	11	9	17	17	15	18	—		
Collegiate Baseball^	14	10	5	1	1	1	2	1	4	15	18	14	19	17	15	15	25		
NCBWA†	12	9	6	3	1	2	4	2	4	6	8	7	12	9	9	12	23		

^ Collegiate Baseball ranked 40 teams in their preseason poll, but only ranked 30 teams weekly during the season.
† NCBWA ranks 30 teams in their preseason poll, but only ranks 25 teams weekly during the season.
* A new poll was not released for this week, so for comparison purposes, the previous week's ranking is inserted in this week's slot.

== Gamecocks in the 2014 MLB draft ==
The following members of the South Carolina Gamecocks baseball program were drafted in the 2014 Major League Baseball draft.

Player	Position	Round	Overall	MLB team
Grayson Greiner	C	3rd	99th	Detroit Tigers
Jordan Montgomery	LHP	4th	122nd	New York Yankees
Joey Pankake	3B	7th	220th	Detroit Tigers
Tanner English	OF	11th	320th	Minnesota Twins
Joel Seddon	RHP	11th	342nd	Oakland A's
Kyle Martin	1B	20th	599th	Anaheim Angels
Evan Beal	RHP	21st	633rd	Kansas City Royals
