= 2014 Vanderbilt Commodores baseball team =

American college baseball season

2014 Vanderbilt Commodores baseball

National Champions

College World Series Final, W, 2–1
- Conference: Southeastern Conference
- Eastern Division

Ranking
- Coaches: No. 1
- CB: No. 1
- Record: 51–21 (17–13 SEC)
- Head coach: Tim Corbin
- Home stadium: Hawkins Field

2014 Southeastern Conference baseball standings
	Conf.						Overall
Team	W		L		T	PCT	W		L		T	PCT
Eastern
No. 24 Florida ^{x}‍†‍‍^{y}	21	–	9	–	0	.700	40	–	23	–	0	.635
No. 25 South Carolina ‍‍‍^{y}	18	–	12	–	0	.600	44	–	18	–	0	.710
No. 1 Vanderbilt ‍‍‍^{y}	17	–	13	–	0	.567	51	–	21	–	0	.708
Kentucky ‍‍‍^{y}	14	–	16	–	0	.467	37	–	25	–	0	.597
Tennessee ‍‍‍	12	–	18	–	0	.400	31	–	23	–	0	.574
Georgia ‍‍‍	11	–	18	–	1	.383	26	–	29	–	1	.473
Missouri ‍‍‍	6	–	24	–	0	.200	20	–	33	–	0	.377
Western
No. 4 Ole Miss ^{x}‍‍‍^{y}	19	–	11	–	0	.633	48	–	21	–	0	.696
No. 21 LSU ‍‍‡‍^{y}	17	–	11	–	1	.603	46	–	16	–	1	.738
No. 28 Mississippi State ‍‍‍^{y}	18	–	12	–	0	.600	39	–	24	–	0	.619
No. 30 Arkansas ‍‍‍^{y}	16	–	14	–	0	.533	40	–	25	–	0	.615
Alabama ‍‍‍^{y}	15	–	14	–	0	.517	37	–	24	–	0	.607
Texas A&M ‍‍‍^{y}	14	–	16	–	0	.467	36	–	26	–	0	.581
Auburn ‍‍‍	10	–	20	–	0	.333	28	–	28	–	0	.500
x – Division champion † – Conference champion ‡ – Tournament champion y – Invited to the NCAA tournament Rankings from Collegiate Baseball

The 2014 Vanderbilt Commodores baseball team represented Vanderbilt University in the 2014 NCAA Division I baseball season. The team played its home games at Hawkins Field in Nashville, Tennessee. The team was coached by Tim Corbin in his twelfth season at Vanderbilt.

The Commodores won the 2014 College World Series, defeating the Virginia Cavaliers 2 games to 1 in the championship series. It was the first NCAA men's championship in school history.

== Personnel ==
=== Roster ===
2014 Vanderbilt Commodores roster
Pitchers: 11 – Tyler Beede – Junior; 12 – Adam Ravenelle – Junior; 13 – Walker Buehler – Sophomore; 15 – Carson Fulmer – Sophomore; 19 – Steven Rice – Senior; 21 – John Kilichowski – Freshman; 24 – Jordan Sheffield – Freshman; 28 – Jared Miller – Junior; 31 – Ryan Johnson – Freshman; 32 – Hayden Stone – Freshman; 33 – Brian Miller – Junior; 34 – Luke Stephenson – (redshirt) Freshman; 35 – Ben Bowden – Freshman; 40 – T.J. Pecoraro – Senior; 45 – Tyler Ferguson – Sophomore	Catchers: 5 – Jason Delay – Freshman; 25 – Karl Ellison – Freshman; 44 – Chris Harvey – Junior; Infielders: 2 – Tyler Campbell – Sophomore; 3 – Vince Conde – Junior; 7 – Dansby Swanson – Sophomore; 9 – Xavier Turner – Sophomore; 16 – Penn Murfee – Freshman; 36 – Aubrey McCarty – Freshman; 43 – Zander Wiel – (redshirt) Sophomore; 55 – Tyler Green – Freshman	Outfielders: 1 – Ro Coleman – Freshman; 6 – Drake Parker – Freshman; 8 – Rhett Wiseman – Sophomore; 10 – John Norwood – Junior; 18 – Nolan Rogers – Freshman; 20 – Bryan Reynolds – Freshman; 23 – Will Cooper – Junior; 39 – Kyle Smith – Sophomore

=== Coaches ===
2014 Vanderbilt Commodores baseball coaching staff
- 4 – Tim Corbin – Head coach
- 26 – Scott Brown – Pitching Coach
- 50 – Travis Jewett – Assistant coach
- 17 – Drew Hedman – Volunteer assistant coach

== Schedule ==
2014 Vanderbilt Commodores baseball game log: 51–21
Regular season (40–16)

February (8–2)
Date	Opponent	Rank	Site/stadium	Score	Win	Loss	Save	Attendance	Overall record	SEC record
Feb 14	@ Long Beach State	No. 9	Blair Field • Long Beach, CA	W 5–2	Beede (1–0)	Sabo (0–1)	None	1,418	1–0	
Feb 15	@ Long Beach State	No. 9	Blair Field • Long Beach, CA	W 6–0	Miller (1–0)	Rohrbach (0–1)	Fulmer (1)	1,572	2–0	
Feb 16	@ Long Beach State	No. 9	Blair Field • Long Beach, CA	W 6–2	Ferguson (1–0)	Provencher (0–1)	None	1,463	3–0	
Feb 19	Lipscomb	No. 8	Hawkins Field • Nashville, TN	W 5–1	Buehler (1–0)	Martinez-McGraw (0–1)	None	2,451	4–0	
Feb 21	UIC	No. 8	Hawkins Field • Nashville, TN	W 14–1	Beede (2–0)	Michelson (1–1)	None	2,321	5–0	
Feb 22	UIC	No. 8	Hawkins Field • Nashville, TN	W 2–0	Miller (2–0)	Lewandowski (1–1)	Fulmer (2)	2,660	6–0	
Feb 23	UIC	No. 8	Hawkins Field • Nashville, TN	W 12–1	Ferguson (2–0)	Anderson (0–1)	None	2,423	7–0	
Feb 25	Western Kentucky	No. 4	Hawkins Field • Nashville, TN	L 2–3	Bartley (1–1)	Buehler (1–1)	Tompkins (4)	2,234	7–1	
Feb 26	Evansville	No. 4	Hawkins Field • Nashville, TN	L 3–8	Rodgers (2–0)	Pecoraro (0–1)	None	2,207	7–2	
Feb 28	Stanford	No. 4	Hawkins Field • Nashville, TN	W 4–1	Beede (3–0)	Hanewich (0–1)	Fulmer (3)	2,329	8–2	

March (15–4)
Date	Opponent	Rank	Site/stadium	Score	Win	Loss	Save	Attendance	Overall record	SEC record
Mar 1	Stanford	No. 4	Hawkins Field • Nashville, TN	W 5–1	Miller (3–0)	Viall (1–1)	None	2,515	9–2	
Mar 2	Stanford	No. 4	Hawkins Field • Nashville, TN	W 4–2	Ravenelle (1–0)	Brakeman (0–2)	Miller (1)	2,649	10–2	
Mar 4	Tennessee Tech	No. 6	Hawkins Field • Nashville, TN	W 4–0	Buehler (2–1)	Honea (1–1)	Stone (1)	2,253	11–2	
Mar 5	@ Middle Tennessee	No. 6	Reese Smith Jr. Field • Murfreesboro, TN	W 4–3	Pecoraro (1–0)	Foriest (0–1)	Fulmer (4)	793	12–2	
Mar 7	Winthrop	No. 6	Hawkins Field • Nashville, TN	W 9–1	Beede (4–0)	Kmiec (1–1)	None	2,288	13–2	
Mar 8	Winthrop	No. 6	Hawkins Field • Nashville, TN	W 5–0	Miller (4–0)	Strain (2–2)	None	2,540	14–2	
Mar 9	Winthrop	No. 6	Hawkins Field • Nashville, TN	W 4–1	Ferguson (3–0)	Strong (0–3)	Fulmer (5)	2,418	15–2	
Mar 11	Eastern Illinois	No. 4	Hawkins Field • Nashville, TN	W 11–2	Buehler (3–1)	Thurston (0–2)	None	2,336	16–2	
Mar 14	No. 3 LSU	No. 4	Hawkins Field • Nashville, TN	L 2–4	Person (1–0)	Beede (4–1)	Broussard (4)	3,626	16–3	0–1
Mar 15	No. 3 LSU	No. 4	Hawkins Field • Nashville, TN	W 5–3	Miller (5–0)	Bouman (3–1)	Fulmer (6)		17–3	1–1
Mar 15	No. 3 LSU	No. 4	Hawkins Field • Nashville, TN	W 9–3	Stone (1–0)	Poche (4–1)	None	3,626	18–3	2–1
Mar 18	@ Belmont	No. 3	E. S. Rose Park • Nashville, TN	W 8–4	Buehler (4–1)	Buckelew (1–3)	None	517	19–3	
Mar 21	@ No. 24 Mississippi State	No. 3	Dudy Noble Field • Starkville, MS	L 2–17	Brown (3–0)	Beede (4–2)	None	9,064	19–4	2–2
Mar 22	@ No. 24 Mississippi State	No. 3	Dudy Noble Field • Starkville, MS	L 3–6	Mitchell (4–1)	Miller (5–1)	Holder (3)	10,064	19–5	2–3
Mar 23	@ No. 24 Mississippi State	No. 3	Dudy Noble Field • Starkville, MS	W 5–1	Ferguson (4–0)	Fitts (2–1)	Fulmer (7)	7,252	20–5	3–3
Mar 25	Belmont	No. 5	Hawkins Field • Nashville, TN	W 2–1	Ravenelle (2–0)	Carroll (2–2)	Miller (2)	2,313	21–5	
Mar 28	No. 17 Kentucky	No. 5	Hawkins Field • Nashville, TN	L 2–4	Reed (5–1)	Beede (4–3)	Cody (1)	2,545	21–6	3–4
Mar 29	No. 17 Kentucky	No. 5	Hawkins Field • Nashville, TN	W 9–3	Miller (6–1)	Shepherd (5–1)	None	2,885	22–6	4–4
Mar 30	No. 17 Kentucky	No. 5	Hawkins Field • Nashville, TN	W 6–2	Ferguson (5–0)	Nelson (1–2)	Fulmer (8)	2,869	23–6	5–4

April (10–6)
Date	Opponent	Rank	Site/stadium	Score	Win	Loss	Save	Attendance	Overall record	SEC record
Apr 1	Tennessee–Martin	No. 5	Hawkins Field • Nashville, TN	W 5–0	Buehler (5–1)	Ross (0–3)	None	2,473	24–6	
Apr 4	@ Tennessee	No. 5	Lindsey Nelson Stadium • Knoxville, TN	W 6–4	Beede (5–3)	Williams (3–3)	Fulmer (9)	2,580	25–6	6–4
Apr 5	@ Tennessee	No. 5	Lindsey Nelson Stadium • Knoxville, TN	L 9–10	Marks (2–0)	Fulmer (0–1)	None	2,457	25–7	6–5
Apr 6	@ Tennessee	No. 5	Lindsey Nelson Stadium • Knoxville, TN	L 0–7	Serrano (3–1)	Ferguson (5–1)	None	3,306	25–8	6–6
Apr 8	Indiana State	No. 10	Hawkins Field • Nashville, TN	W 6–2	Buehler (6–1)	Lunsford (0–2)	None	2,251	26–8	
Apr 11	Texas A&M	No. 10	Hawkins Field • Nashville, TN	L 4–10	Ray (4–2)	Beede (5–4)	None	3,019	26–9	6–7
Apr 12	Texas A&M	No. 10	Hawkins Field • Nashville, TN	W 8–5	Miller (1–0)	Mengden (2–5)	None	3,362	27–9	7–7
Apr 13	Texas A&M	No. 10	Hawkins Field • Nashville, TN	L 2–8	Long (4–1)	Ferguson (5–2)	None	3,015	27–10	7–8
Apr 15	Middle Tennessee	No. 16	Hawkins Field • Nashville, TN	W 19–1	Buehler (7–1)	Kessler (2–1)	None	2,364	28–10	
Apr 18	@ Arkansas	No. 16	Baum Stadium • Fayetteville, AR	L 2–6	Killian (2–6)	Beede (5–5)	None	9,044	28–11	7–9
Apr 19	@ Arkansas	No. 16	Baum Stadium • Fayetteville, AR	W 2–1	Fulmer (1–1)	Beeks (5–3)	Miller (3)	9,578	29–11	8–9
Apr 20	@ Arkansas	No. 16	Baum Stadium • Fayetteville, AR	L 1–3	Oliver (5–3)	Ferguson (5–3)	Gunn (6)	8,126	29–12	8–10
Apr 22	vs. Memphis	No. 26	The Ballpark at Jackson • Jackson, TN	W 2–1	Buehler (8–1)	Toscano (3–3)	None	1,234	30–12	
Apr 26	Georgia	No. 26	Hawkins Field • Nashville, TN	W 12–9	Beede (6–5)	Lawlor (3–4)	Miller (4)	3,397	31–12	9–10
Apr 26	Georgia	No. 26	Hawkins Field • Nashville, TN	W 11–0	Fulmer (2–1)	Tyler (4–4)	None	2,952	32–12	10–10
Apr 27	Georgia	No. 26	Hawkins Field • Nashville, TN	W 6–1	Ferguson (6–3)	Sosebee (0–3)	None	3,353	33–12	11–10

May (7–4)
Date	Opponent	Rank	Site/stadium	Score	Win	Loss	Save	Attendance	Overall record	SEC record
May 2	@ Missouri	No. 25	Taylor Stadium • Columbia, MO	W 8–3	Beede (7–5)	Graves (3–4)	None	1,057	34–12	12–10
May 3	@ Missouri	No. 25	Taylor Stadium • Columbia, MO	W 5–1	Fulmer (3–1)	Miles (2–6)	Stone (2)	1,846	35–12	13–10
May 4	@ Missouri	No. 25	Taylor Stadium • Columbia, MO	W 3–1	Ravenelle (3–0)	Steele (0–7)	Miller (5)	1,427	36–12	14–10
May 6	No. 12 Louisville	No. 17	Hawkins Field • Nashville, TN	L 7–11	Alphin (1–0)	Buehler (8–2)	None	3,068	36–13	
May 8	@ No. 4 Florida	No. 17	Alfred A. McKethan Stadium • Gainesville, FL	L 0–1	Shore (7–2)	Beede (7–6)	Poyner (4)	2,803	36–14	14–11
May 9	@ No. 4 Florida	No. 17	Alfred A. McKethan Stadium • Gainesville, FL	W 3–0	Fulmer (4–0)	Dunning (1–1)	None	4,112	37–14	15–11
May 10	@ No. 4 Florida	No. 17	Alfred A. McKethan Stadium • Gainesville, FL	W 16–2	Ferguson (7–3)	Whitson (1–1)	None	3,289	38–14	16–11
May 13	Southeast Missouri State	No. 14	Hawkins Field • Nashville, TN	W 10–4	Buehler (9–2)	Stockton (0–1)	None	2,537	39–14	
May 15	No. 17 South Carolina	No. 14	Hawkins Field • Nashville, TN	L 3–4^{10}	Seddon (3–1)	Miller (1–1)	None	2,819	39–15	16–12
May 16	No. 17 South Carolina	No. 14	Hawkins Field • Nashville, TN	W 9–3	Fulmer (5–1)	Wynkoop (7–4)	Stone (3)	3,429	40–19	17–12
May 17	No. 17 South Carolina	No. 14	Hawkins Field • Nashville, TN	L 3–6	Crowe (7–3)	Ravenelle (3–1)	None	3,626	40–16	17–13

Postseason (11–5)

SEC Tournament (1–2)
Date	Opponent	Seed Rank	Site/stadium	Score	Win	Loss	Save	Attendance	Overall record	SECT Record
May 20	(11) Tennessee	(6) No. 18	Hoover Metropolitan Stadium • Hoover, AL	W 3–2	Buehler (10–2)	Martin (4–4)	Fulmer (10)		41–16	1–0
May 21	(3) No. 14 LSU	(6) No. 18	Hoover Metropolitan Stadium • Hoover, AL	L 1–11^{7}	Posche (9–3)	Miller (6–2)	None		41–17	1–1
May 22	(2) No. 13 Ole Miss	(6) No. 18	Hoover Metropolitan Stadium • Hoover, AL	L 2–7	Greenwood (2–1)	Beede (7–7)	None		41–18	1–2

NCAA tournament: Nashville Regional (3–0)
Date	Opponent	Seed Rank	Site/stadium	Score	Win	Loss	Save	Attendance	Overall record	NCAAT record
May 30	(4) Xavier	(1) No. 19	Hawkins Field • Nashville, TN	W 11–0	Beede (8–7)	Nittoli (6–4)	None	2,915	42–18	1–0
May 31	(2) No. 20 Oregon	(1) No. 19	Hawkins Field • Nashville, TN	W 7–2	Fulmer (6–1)	Gold (10–3)	None	2,841	43–18	2–0
June 1	(2) No. 20 Oregon	(1) No. 19	Hawkins Field • Nashville, TN	W 3–2	Buehler (11–2)	Cleavinger (3–2)	None	2,639	44–18	3–0

NCAA tournament: Nashville Super Regional (2–1)
Date	Opponent	Rank	Site/stadium	Score	Win	Loss	Save	Attendance	Overall record	NCAAT record
June 6	No. 15 Stanford	No. 8	Hawkins Field • Nashville, TN	W 11–6	Ferguson (8–3)	Hochstatter (10–3)	None	3,626	45–18	4–0
June 7	No. 15 Stanford	No. 8	Hawkins Field • Nashville, TN	L 4–5	Vanegas (4–3)	Ravenelle (3–2)	None	3,626	45–19	4–1
June 8	No. 15 Stanford	No. 8	Hawkins Field • Nashville, TN	W 12–5	Stone (2–0)	James (3–4)	None	3,626	46–19	5–1

College World Series (5–2)
Date	Opponent	Rank	Site/stadium	Score	Win	Loss	Save	Attendance	Overall record	CWS record
June 14	No. 3 Louisville	No. 5	TD Ameritrade Park • Omaha, NE	W 3–5	Fulmer (7–1)	Funkhouser (13–3)	Ravenelle (1)	23,625	47–19	1–0
June 16	No. 8 UC Irvine	No. 5	TD Ameritrade Park • Omaha, NE	W 6–4	Buehler (12–2)	Surrey (8–5)	None	20,792	48–19	2–0
June 20	No. 6 Texas	No. 5	TD Ameritrade Park • Omaha, NE	L 0–4	Thornhill (9–3)	Ferguson (8–4)	None	18,287	48–20	2–1
June 21	No. 6 Texas	No. 5	TD Ameritrade Park • Omaha, NE	W 4–3	Stone (3–0)	Curtiss (2–3)	None	16,084	49–20	3–1
June 23	(3) No. 1 Virginia	No. 5	TD Ameritrade Park • Omaha, NE	W 9–8	Miller (7–2)	Kirby (9–3)	Ravenelle (2)	20,755	50–20	4–1
June 24	(3) No. 1 Virginia	No. 5	TD Ameritrade Park • Omaha, NE	L 2–7	Waddell (10–3)	Beede (8–8)	None	24,308	50–21	4–2
June 25	(3) No. 1 Virginia	No. 5	TD Ameritrade Park • Omaha, NE	W 3–2	Stone (4–0)	Howard (2–2)	Ravenelle (3)	18,344	51–21	5–2

== Record vs. conference opponents ==
Last two do not qualify for conf. tourn. Blank are not scheduled. Blue are home games, otherwise away.

2014 SEC baseball records Source: 2014 SEC baseball game results
Team	W–L	ALA	ARK	AUB	FLA	UGA	KEN	LSU	MSU	MIZZ	MISS	SCAR	TENN	TAMU	VAN	Team	Div	SR	SW
ALA	15–14		1–2	2–1	0–3	.	2–1	1–1	1–2	.	3–0	1–2	2–1	2–1	.	ALA	W5	5–4	1–1
ARK	16–14	2–1		1–2	1–2	.	.	1–2	1–2	3–0	1–2	2–1	.	2–1	2–1	ARK	W4	5–5	1–0
AUB	10–20	1–2	2–1		.	.	1–2	0–3	0–3	1–2	0–3	1–2	2–1	2–1	.	AUB	W7	3–7	0–3
FLA	21–9	3–0	2–1	.		3–0	1–2	3–0	.	3–0	.	2–1	2–1	1–2	1–2	FLA	E1	7–3	4–0
UGA	11–18	.	.	.	0–3		1–2	0–2	1–2	2–1	1–2	2–1	2–1	2–1	0–3	UGA	E6	4–6	0–2
KEN	14–16	1–2	.	2–1	2–1	2–1		.	.	1–2	0–3	2–1	1–2	2–1	1–2	KEN	E4	5–5	0–1
LSU	17–11	1–1	2–1	3–0	0–3	2–0	.		3–0	.	2–1	.	2–1	1–2	1–2	LSU	W2	6–3	2–1
MSU	18–12	2–1	2–1	3–0	.	2–1	.	0–3		3–0	1–2	.	2–1	1–2	2–1	MSU	W3	7–3	2–1
MIZZ	6–24	.	0–3	2–1	0–3	1–2	2–1	.	0–3		0–3	0–3	1–2	.	0–3	MIZZ	E7	2–8	0–6
MISS	19–11	0–3	2–1	3–0	.	2–1	3–0	1–2	2–1	3–0		1–2	.	2–1	.	MISS	W1	7–3	3–1
SCAR	18–12	2–1	1–2	2–1	1–2	1–2	1–2	.	.	3–0	2–1		3–0	.	2–1	SCAR	E2	6–4	2–0
TENN	12–18	1–2	.	1–2	1–2	1–2	2–1	1–2	1–2	2–1	.	0–3		.	2–1	TENN	E5	3–7	0–1
TAMU	14–16	1–2	1–2	1–2	2–1	1–2	1–2	2–1	2–1	.	1–2	.	.		2–1	TAMU	W6	4–6	0–0
VAN	17–13	.	1–2	.	2–1	3–0	2–1	2–1	1–2	3–0	.	1–2	1–2	1–2		VAN	E3	5–5	2–0
Team	W–L	ALA	ARK	AUB	FLA	UGA	KEN	LSU	MSU	MIZZ	MISS	SCAR	TENN	TAMU	VAN	Team	Div	SR	SW

Updated for entire regular season. Georgia at LSU had a tie game.

== Ranking Movements ==
Ranking movements Legend: ██ Increase in ranking ██ Decrease in ranking
	Week																		
Poll	Pre	1	2	3	4	5	6	7	8	9	10	11	12	13	14	15	16	17	Final
Coaches'	8	8*		4	3	3	5	4	7	12	14	9	10	9	10	14			1
Baseball America	10	9	8	8	7	6	7	7	11	18	25	20	18	18	19	20			1
Collegiate Baseball^	9	8	4	6	5	3	5	5	10	16	26	25	17	14	18	19	8	5	1
NCBWA†	10	6	4	6	5	5	6	5	7	11	15	11	10	10	10	13	6	1	1

^ Collegiate Baseball ranked 40 teams in their preseason poll, but only ranked 30 teams weekly during the season.
† NCBWA ranks 30 teams in their preseason poll, but only ranks 25 teams weekly during the season.
* A new poll was not released for this week, so for comparison purposes, the previous week's ranking is inserted in this week's slot.
