= 2014 Alabama Crimson Tide baseball team =

American college baseball season

2014 Alabama Crimson Tide baseball

Tallahassee Regional, 2–2
- Conference: Southeastern Conference
- West
- Record: 34–22 (15–14 SEC)
- Head coach: Mitch Gaspard (5th season)
- Hitting coach: Andy Phillips
- Pitching coach: Dax Norris
- Home stadium: Sewell-Thomas Stadium

2014 Southeastern Conference baseball standings
	Conf.						Overall
Team	W		L		T	PCT	W		L		T	PCT
Eastern
No. 24 Florida ^{x}‍†‍‍^{y}	21	–	9	–	0	.700	40	–	23	–	0	.635
No. 25 South Carolina ‍‍‍^{y}	18	–	12	–	0	.600	44	–	18	–	0	.710
No. 1 Vanderbilt ‍‍‍^{y}	17	–	13	–	0	.567	51	–	21	–	0	.708
Kentucky ‍‍‍^{y}	14	–	16	–	0	.467	37	–	25	–	0	.597
Tennessee ‍‍‍	12	–	18	–	0	.400	31	–	23	–	0	.574
Georgia ‍‍‍	11	–	18	–	1	.383	26	–	29	–	1	.473
Missouri ‍‍‍	6	–	24	–	0	.200	20	–	33	–	0	.377
Western
No. 4 Ole Miss ^{x}‍‍‍^{y}	19	–	11	–	0	.633	48	–	21	–	0	.696
No. 21 LSU ‍‍‡‍^{y}	17	–	11	–	1	.603	46	–	16	–	1	.738
No. 28 Mississippi State ‍‍‍^{y}	18	–	12	–	0	.600	39	–	24	–	0	.619
No. 30 Arkansas ‍‍‍^{y}	16	–	14	–	0	.533	40	–	25	–	0	.615
Alabama ‍‍‍^{y}	15	–	14	–	0	.517	37	–	24	–	0	.607
Texas A&M ‍‍‍^{y}	14	–	16	–	0	.467	36	–	26	–	0	.581
Auburn ‍‍‍	10	–	20	–	0	.333	28	–	28	–	0	.500
x – Division champion † – Conference champion ‡ – Tournament champion y – Invited to the NCAA tournament Rankings from Collegiate Baseball

The 2014 Alabama Crimson Tide baseball team represented the University of Alabama in the 2014 NCAA Division I baseball season. The Crimson Tide played their home games in Sewell-Thomas Stadium.

== Personnel ==
=== Returning starters ===
Player	Class	Position
Austen Smith	Senior	1B
Kyle Overstreet	Sophomore	2B
Mikey White	Sophomore	SS
Georgie Salem	Sophomore	CF
Ben Moore	Sophomore	RF
Taylor Guilbeau	Junior	SP
Tucker Hawley	Senior	SP
Justin Kamplain	Junior	SP
Ray Castillo	Sophomore	Closer

=== Roster ===
2014 Alabama Crimson Tide roster
Pitchers: 15 Geoffrey Bramblett - Freshman; 17 Jay Shaw - Junior; 20 Taylor Guilbeau - Junior; 23 Ray Castillo - Sophomore; 26 Justin Kamplain - Junior; 28 Jake Hubbard - (redshirt) Sophomore; 29 Nick Eicholtz - Freshman; 31 Jonathan Hess - (redshirt) Freshman; 32 Spencer Turnbull - Junior; 33 Mitch Greer - Sophomore; 35 Jon Keller - Junior; 37 Matt Salom - Sophomore; 42 Tyler Adams - Freshman; 44 Tucker Hawley - Senior; 55 Mike Oczypok - Sophomore	Catchers: 10 Wade Wass - (redshirt) Junior; 37 Taylor Poe - (redshirt) Freshman; 50 Anthony Sherlag - Freshman; Infielders: 1 Mikey White - Sophomore; 3 Daniel Cucjen - Sophomore; 6 Kyle Overstreet - Sophomore; 11 Taylor Propst - Freshman; 12 Chance Vincent - Sophomore; 18 Austen Smith - Senior; 49 Steven Cole - Senior	Outfielders: 7 Ben Moore - Junior; 9 Casey Hughston - Freshman; 13 William Elliott - Freshman; 14 Mathew Goodson - (redshirt) Freshman; 19 Hunter Webb - Freshman; 22 Georgie Salem - Sophomore; 25 Ryan Blanchard - Sophomore; 45 Riley Colburn - Sophomore; Utility: 16 Cary Baxter - Junior; 21 Colton Freeman - (redshirt) Freshman; 24 Will Haynie - Freshman; 38 J.C. Wilhite - Junior; 40 Thomas Burrows - Freshman; 48 Trevor Sprowl - Junior

2014 Alabama Crimson Tide Baseball Roster

=== Coaching staff ===
2014 Alabama Crimson Tide baseball coaching staff
- 8 Mitch Gaspard – Head Coach - 14 years at Alabama (5th as Head Coach)
- 2 Andy Phillips – Assistant Coach, Hitting Coach - 4th year
- 4 Dax Norris – Assistant Coach, Pitching Coach, Recruiting Coordinator - 7th year
- 43 Bobby Barbier – Volunteer Coach - 5th year
- Ken Brown – Director of Baseball Operations - 3rd year

== Schedule and results ==
2014 Alabama Crimson Tide baseball game log
Regular season: 34–21
February (4–4)

Date	Opponent	Rank	Site/stadium	Score	Win	Loss	Save	Attendance	Overall record	SEC record
February 14	Saint Louis	No. 29	Sewell-Thomas Stadium	L 1–2	N. Bates (1–0)	T. Hawley (0–1)	M. Eckelman (1)	2,601	0–1	–
February 15	Saint Louis	No. 29	Sewell-Thomas Stadium	W 4–3	T. Burrows (1–0)	D. Rivera (0–1)	None	3,242	1–1	–
February 16	Saint Louis	No. 29	Sewell-Thomas Stadium	W 9–3	J. Keller (1–0)	Z. Girrens (0–1)	None	3,231	2–1	–
February 21	Stephen F. Austin	No. 28	Sewell-Thomas Stadium	L 1–2^{(13)}	T. Wiedenfeld (1–0)	J. Shaw (0–1)	P. Ledet (1)	3,996	2–2	–
February 22	Stephen F. Austin	No. 28	Sewell-Thomas Stadium	W 8–0	J. Kamplain (1–0)	K. Cross (0–2)	None	3,816	3–2	–
February 23	Stephen F. Austin	No. 28	Sewell-Thomas Stadium	W 3–2^{(10)}	J. Keller (2–0)	K. Bishop (0–2)	None	3,337	4–2	–
February 26	Southern Miss		Pete Taylor Park	L 1–2	J. Myrick (1–1)	T. Guilbeau (0–1)	B. Roney (2)	3,491	4–3	–
February 28	No. 13 Louisiana–Lafayette		M. L. Tigue Moore Field	L 0–2	A. Robichaux (2–1)	S. Turnbull (0–1)	None	4,040	4–4	–

March (15–4)

Date	Opponent	Rank	Site/stadium	Score	Win	Loss	Save	Attendance	Overall record	SEC record
March 1	No. 13 Louisiana–Lafayette		M. L. Tigue Moore Field	L 0–6	C. Baranik (2–0)	J. Kamplain (1–1)	None	4,004	4–5	–
March 2	No. 13 Louisiana–Lafayette		M. L. Tigue Moore Field	W 12–6	J. Keller (3–0)	G. Milhorn (2–1)	None	4,031	5–5	–
March 4†	Auburn		Riverwalk Stadium	W 4–3	T. Burrows (2–0)	T. Dedrick (0–2)	None	6,141	6–5	–
March 7	MS Valley State		Sewell-Thomas Stadium	W 8–0	S. Turnbull (1–1)	C. Sheppeard (0–4)	None	3,982	7–5	–
March 8	MS Valley State		Sewell-Thomas Stadium	W 7–0	J. Kamplain (2–1)	J. Parker (0–3)	None	4,139	8–5	–
March 9	MS Valley State		Sewell-Thomas Stadium	W 3–0	J. Keller (4–0)	B. McBride (0–1)	K. Overstreet (1)	3,109	9–5	–
March 11	Samford		Sewell-Thomas Stadium	W 12–1	N. Eicholtz (1–0)	C. Pugh (2–1)	None	2,820	10–5	–
March 14	No. 21 Kentucky		Sewell-Thomas Stadium	W 3–0	S. Turnbull (2–1)	A. Reed (3–1)	T. Burrows (1)	4,258	11–5	1–0
March 15	No. 21 Kentucky		Sewell-Thomas Stadium	L 2–7	C. Shepherd (4–0)	J. Kamplain (2–2)	None	–	11–6	1–1
March 15	No. 21 Kentucky		Sewell-Thomas Stadium	W 5–3^{(10)}	T. Burrows (3–0)	L. Salow (1–1)	None	4,142	12–6	2–1
March 18	Alcorn State	No. 28	Sewell-Thomas Stadium	W 17–3	G. Bramblett (1–0)	J. Vasquez (0–1)	None	2,554	13–6	–
March 19	Alcorn State	No. 28	Sewell-Thomas Stadium	W 12–0	T. Hawley (1–1)	J. Lemond (0–1)	None	2,524	14–6	–
March 21	Arkansas	No. 28	Baum Stadium	17–9	J. Shaw (1–1)	Z. Jackson (1–1)	None	8,112	15–6	3–1
March 22	Arkansas	No. 28	Baum Stadium	L 1–2	T. Killian (1–3)	T. Burrows (3–1)	None	9,036	15–7	3–2
March 23	Arkansas	No. 28	Baum Stadium	L 0–1	C. Oliver (2–2)	J. Keller (4–1)	M. Gunn (3)	7,967	15–8	3–3
March 25	Troy		Pensacola Bayfront Stadium	W 10–5	N. Eicholtz (2–0)	W. Shell (3–2)	None	5,038	16–8	–
March 28	No. 12 Ole Miss		Sewell-Thomas Stadium	W 7–6	S. Turnbull (3–1)	S. Weathersby (1–1)	T. Burrows (2)	4,258	17–8	4–3
March 29	No. 12 Ole Miss		Sewell-Thomas Stadium	W 6–5^{(10)}	G. Bramblett (2–0)	W. Short (3–1)	None	4,001	18–8	5–3
March 30	No. 12 Ole Miss		Sewell-Thomas Stadium	W 3–1	J. Keller (5–1)	S. Smith (3–2)	None	3,575	19–8	6–3

April (11–7)

Date	Opponent	Rank	Site/stadium	Score	Win	Loss	Save	Attendance	Overall record	SEC record
April 1	Louisiana–Monroe	No. 15	Sewell-Thomas Stadium	W 3–2	T. Hawley (2–1)	C. Taylor (2–2)	T. Burrows (3)	3,005	20–8	–
April 4	Texas A&M	No. 15	Olsen Field	W 5–1	S. Turnbull (4–1)	D. Mengden (2–4)	None	4,806	21–8	7–3
April 5	Texas A&M	No. 15	Olsen Field	L 7–13	P. Ray (3–2)	J. Shaw (1–2)	None	–	21–9	7–4
April 5	Texas A&M	No. 15	Olsen Field	W 6–4	R. Castillo (1–0)	J. Jester (2–2)	T. Burrows (4)	5,038	22–9	8–4
April 8	UAB	No. 9	Sewell-Thomas Stadium	L 1–2	A. Lamar (1–0)	J. Shaw (1–3)	A. Lau (4)	2,905	22–10	–
April 11	Auburn	No. 9	Sewell-Thomas Stadium	L 1–2	D. Ortman (6–2)	S. Turnbull (4–2)	K. Thompson (1)	6,069	22–11	8–5
April 12	Auburn	No. 9	Sewell-Thomas Stadium	W 4–1	J. Kamplain (3–2)	M. O'Neal (2–4)	T. Burrows (5)	6,142	23–11	9–5
April 13	Auburn	No. 9	Sewell-Thomas Stadium	W 4–3	T. Burrows (4–1)	K. Thompson (5–2)	None	4,468	24–11	10–5
April 15	Jackson State	No. 8	Sewell-Thomas Stadium	W 8–1	T. Hawley (3–1)	A. Juday (4–3)	None	2,587	25–11	–
April 16	UAB	No. 8	Regions Field	W 5–2	G. Bramblett (3–0)	A. Lamar (1–1)	T. Burrows (6)	3,067	26–11	–
April 18	Tennessee	No. 8	Lindsey Nelson Stadium	W 8–5	S. Turnbull (5–2)	N. Williams (4–4)	T. Burrows (7)	2,018	27–11	11–5
April 19	Tennessee	No. 8	Lindsey Nelson Stadium	W 7–6	J. Shaw (2–3)	A.Cox (3–1)	T. Burrows (8)	2,670	28–11	12–5
April 20	Tennessee	No. 8	Lindsey Nelson Stadium	L 9–10	A. Lee (4–1)	K. Overstreet (0–1)	None	1,845	28–12	12–6
April 22	Southern Miss	No. 8	Sewell-Thomas Stadium	L 3–6	C. Giannini (3–2)	G. Bramblett (3–1)	J. Seddon (11)	2,852	28–13	-
April 25	No. 18 South Carolina	No. 8	Carolina Stadium	L 3–9	J. Montgomery (6–3)	S. Turnbull (5–3)	None	8,242	28–14	12–7
April 26	No. 18 South Carolina	No. 8	Carolina Stadium	W 2–1	J. Kamplain (4–2)	J. Wynkoop (5–3)	T. Burrows (9)	8,242	29–14	13–7
April 27	No. 18 South Carolina	No. 8	Carolina Stadium	L 3–9	C. Mincey (4–0)	N. Eicholtz (2–1)	J. Seddon(12)	8,074	29–15	13–8
April 30	Samford	No. 16	Joe Lee Griffin Stadium	W 9–5	G. Bramblett (4–1)	C. Pugh (3–4)	None	1,927	30–15	–

May (4–6)

Date	Opponent	Rank	Site/stadium	Score	Win	Loss	Save	Attendance	Overall record	SEC record
May 2	No. 8 Florida	No. 16	Sewell-Thomas Stadium	L 3–7	L. Shore (6–2)	S. Turnbull (5–4)	E. Hanhold (3)	4,103	30–16	13-9
May 3	No. 8 Florida	No. 16	Sewell-Thomas Stadium	L 3–4	A. Puk (4–2)	J. Kamplain (5–3)	R. Harris (5)	4,191	30–17	13–10
May 4	No. 8 Florida	No. 16	Sewell-Thomas Stadium	L 3–13	K. Snead (2–0)	J. Keller (5–2)	None	3,662	30–18	13–11
May 6	Jacksonville State	No. 20	Sewell-Thomas Stadium	W 6–1	N. Eicholtz (3–1)	A. Polk (4–3)	T. Hawley (1)	2,820	31–18	–
May 10	No. 15 LSU	No. 20	Alex Box Stadium	L 0–2	A. Nola (8–1)	S. Turnbull (5–5)	None	11,163	31–19	13–12
May 10	No. 15 LSU	No. 20	Alex Box Stadium	W 5–1	J. Kamplain (5–3)	A. Cartwright (1–1)	None	11,286	32–19	14–12
May 11	No. 15 LSU	No. 20	Alex Box Stadium	Canceled						
May 13	Jacksonville State	No. 22	Rudy Abbott Field	W 15–10	T. Hawley (4–1)	T. Urban (1–3)	None	2,834	33–19	–
May 15	No. 16 Mississippi State	No. 22	Sewell-Thomas Stadium	L 4–2	J. Lindgren (5–1)	G. Bramblett (3–1)	M. Gentry (3)	3,201	33–20	14–13
May 16	No. 16 Mississippi State	No. 22	Sewell-Thomas Stadium	L 0–1	R. Mitchell (8–4)	S. Turnbull (5–6)	J. Holder (7)	3,647	33–21	14–14
May 17	No. 16 Mississippi State	No. 22	Sewell-Thomas Stadium	W 2–1	J. Kamplain (6–3)	P. Brown (4–2)	T. Burrows (10)	6,142	34–22	15–14

Postseason: 2–3
SEC tournament (0–1)

Date	Opponent	Seed/Rank	Site/stadium	Score	Win	Loss	Save	Attendance	Overall record	SECT record
May 20	vs. (9) Kentucky	(8)	Hoover Met	L 1–7	A. Reed (11–2)	N. Eicholtz (3–2)	A. Nelson (1)	8,175	34–22	0–1

NCAA tournament: Tallahassee Regional (2–2)

Date	Opponent	Seed/Rank	Site/stadium	Score	Win	Loss	Save	Attendance	Overall record	SECT record
May 30	(3) No. 27 Kennesaw State	(2)	Dick Howser Stadium	L 0–1	T. Bergen (7–4)	S. Turnbull (5–7)	J. McCalvin (15)	2,798	34–23	0–1
May 31	(1) No. 8 Florida State	(2)	Dick Howser Stadium	W 6–5	J. Kamplain (7–3)	L. Weaver (8–4)	T. Burrows (11)	3,586	35–23	1–1
June 1	(4) Georgia Southern	(2)	Dick Howser Stadium	W 6–0	G. Bramblett (4–2)	W. Jackson (3–2)	None	2,923	36–23	2–1
June 1	(3) No. 27 Kennesaw State	(2)	Dick Howser Stadium	L 2–4	T. Bergen (8–4)	T. Burrows (4–2)	J. McCalvin (16)	-	36–24	2–2

† Indicates the game does not count toward the 2014 Southeastern Conference standings.
*Rankings are based on the team's current ranking in the Collegiate Baseball poll the week Alabama faced each opponent.

== Honors and awards ==
- Thomas Burrows was named SEC Freshman of the Week on March 17.
- Jon Keller was named SEC Co-Pitcher of the Week on March 31.
- Hunter Webb was named SEC Freshman of the Week on April 7.
- Justin Kamplain was named SEC Pitcher of the Week on April 14.
- Thomas Burrows was named SEC Freshman of the Week on April 21.

== Record vs. conference opponents ==
Last two do not qualify for conf. tourn. Blank are not scheduled. Blue are home games, otherwise away.

2014 SEC baseball records Source: 2014 SEC baseball game results
Team	W–L	ALA	ARK	AUB	FLA	UGA	KEN	LSU	MSU	MIZZ	MISS	SCAR	TENN	TAMU	VAN	Team	Div	SR	SW
ALA	15–14		1–2	2–1	0–3	.	2–1	1–1	1–2	.	3–0	1–2	2–1	2–1	.	ALA	W5	5–4	1–1
ARK	16–14	2–1		1–2	1–2	.	.	1–2	1–2	3–0	1–2	2–1	.	2–1	2–1	ARK	W4	5–5	1–0
AUB	10–20	1–2	2–1		.	.	1–2	0–3	0–3	1–2	0–3	1–2	2–1	2–1	.	AUB	W7	3–7	0–3
FLA	21–9	3–0	2–1	.		3–0	1–2	3–0	.	3–0	.	2–1	2–1	1–2	1–2	FLA	E1	7–3	4–0
UGA	11–18	.	.	.	0–3		1–2	0–2	1–2	2–1	1–2	2–1	2–1	2–1	0–3	UGA	E6	4–6	0–2
KEN	14–16	1–2	.	2–1	2–1	2–1		.	.	1–2	0–3	2–1	1–2	2–1	1–2	KEN	E4	5–5	0–1
LSU	17–11	1–1	2–1	3–0	0–3	2–0	.		3–0	.	2–1	.	2–1	1–2	1–2	LSU	W2	6–3	2–1
MSU	18–12	2–1	2–1	3–0	.	2–1	.	0–3		3–0	1–2	.	2–1	1–2	2–1	MSU	W3	7–3	2–1
MIZZ	6–24	.	0–3	2–1	0–3	1–2	2–1	.	0–3		0–3	0–3	1–2	.	0–3	MIZZ	E7	2–8	0–6
MISS	19–11	0–3	2–1	3–0	.	2–1	3–0	1–2	2–1	3–0		1–2	.	2–1	.	MISS	W1	7–3	3–1
SCAR	18–12	2–1	1–2	2–1	1–2	1–2	1–2	.	.	3–0	2–1		3–0	.	2–1	SCAR	E2	6–4	2–0
TENN	12–18	1–2	.	1–2	1–2	1–2	2–1	1–2	1–2	2–1	.	0–3		.	2–1	TENN	E5	3–7	0–1
TAMU	14–16	1–2	1–2	1–2	2–1	1–2	1–2	2–1	2–1	.	1–2	.	.		2–1	TAMU	W6	4–6	0–0
VAN	17–13	.	1–2	.	2–1	3–0	2–1	2–1	1–2	3–0	.	1–2	1–2	1–2		VAN	E3	5–5	2–0
Team	W–L	ALA	ARK	AUB	FLA	UGA	KEN	LSU	MSU	MIZZ	MISS	SCAR	TENN	TAMU	VAN	Team	Div	SR	SW

Updated for entire regular season. Georgia at LSU had a tie game.

== Rankings ==
Ranking movements Legend: ██ Increase in ranking ██ Decrease in ranking — = Not ranked RV = Received votes
	Week																			
Poll	Pre	1	2	3	4	5	6	7	8	9	10	11	12	13	14	15	16	17	18	Final
Coaches'	RV	RV*	RV	RV	RV	RV	RV	21	16	19	18	20	22	22	RV					
Baseball America	21	21	21	—	—	—	—	15	10	8	8	12	19	19	—					
Collegiate Baseball^	28	28	—	—	—	28	—	15	9	8	8	16	20	22	—					
NCBWA†	27	27	28	RV	RV	28	30	21	16	17	17	20	23	22	25					

^ Collegiate Baseball ranked 40 teams in their preseason poll, but only ranked 30 teams weekly during the season.
† NCBWA ranks 30 teams in their preseason poll, but only ranks 25 teams weekly during the season.
* A new poll was not released for this week, so for comparison purposes, the previous week's ranking is inserted in this week's slot.

== See also ==
- Alabama Crimson Tide baseball
- 2014 NCAA Division I baseball season
- 2014 Alabama Crimson Tide softball season
