= 2014 Mississippi State Bulldogs baseball team =

American college baseball season

2014 Mississippi State Bulldogs baseball
- Conference: Southeastern Conference
- Western Division
- Record: 39–24 (18–12 SEC)
- Head coach: John Cohen (6th season)
- Assistant coaches: Butch Thompson (6th season); Nick Mingione (2nd season)
- Home stadium: Dudy Noble Field

2014 Southeastern Conference baseball standings
	Conf.						Overall
Team	W		L		T	PCT	W		L		T	PCT
Eastern
No. 24 Florida ^{x}‍†‍‍^{y}	21	–	9	–	0	.700	40	–	23	–	0	.635
No. 25 South Carolina ‍‍‍^{y}	18	–	12	–	0	.600	44	–	18	–	0	.710
No. 1 Vanderbilt ‍‍‍^{y}	17	–	13	–	0	.567	51	–	21	–	0	.708
Kentucky ‍‍‍^{y}	14	–	16	–	0	.467	37	–	25	–	0	.597
Tennessee ‍‍‍	12	–	18	–	0	.400	31	–	23	–	0	.574
Georgia ‍‍‍	11	–	18	–	1	.383	26	–	29	–	1	.473
Missouri ‍‍‍	6	–	24	–	0	.200	20	–	33	–	0	.377
Western
No. 4 Ole Miss ^{x}‍‍‍^{y}	19	–	11	–	0	.633	48	–	21	–	0	.696
No. 21 LSU ‍‍‡‍^{y}	17	–	11	–	1	.603	46	–	16	–	1	.738
No. 28 Mississippi State ‍‍‍^{y}	18	–	12	–	0	.600	39	–	24	–	0	.619
No. 30 Arkansas ‍‍‍^{y}	16	–	14	–	0	.533	40	–	25	–	0	.615
Alabama ‍‍‍^{y}	15	–	14	–	0	.517	37	–	24	–	0	.607
Texas A&M ‍‍‍^{y}	14	–	16	–	0	.467	36	–	26	–	0	.581
Auburn ‍‍‍	10	–	20	–	0	.333	28	–	28	–	0	.500
x – Division champion † – Conference champion ‡ – Tournament champion y – Invited to the NCAA tournament Rankings from Collegiate Baseball

The 2014 Mississippi State Bulldogs baseball team represented the Mississippi State University in the 2014 NCAA Division I baseball season. The Bulldogs played their home games at Dudy Noble Field.

== Schedule and results ==
Game results and box scores can be found at the reference.

== SEC Tournament ==
Mississippi State, the 5 seed, beats 12 seed Georgia and beats 4 seed South Carolina. They then lose to 9 seed Kentucky in an upset and lose to 1 seed Florida, eliminating them immediately before the semifinal game.

== NCAA tournament ==
Mississippi State, a regional 2 seed in the Lafayette Regional, beats regional 3 seed San Diego State and 4 seed Jackson State. Louisiana–Lafayette, having lost their first game to Jackson State, beats San Diego State and Jackson State, then beats Mississippi State twice to win the regional. Mississippi State finishes 2nd in the regional.

== MLB draft ==
Player	Position	Round	Overall	MLB team
Jacob Lindgren	LHP	2	55	New York Yankees
Jonathan Holder	RHP	6	182	New York Yankees
Brandon Woodruff	RHP	11	326	Milwaukee Brewers
Brett Pirtle	2B	23	700	Detroit Tigers

== Record vs. conference opponents ==
Last two do not qualify for conf. tourn. Blank are not scheduled. Blue are home games, otherwise away.

2014 SEC baseball records Source: 2014 SEC baseball game results
Team	W–L	ALA	ARK	AUB	FLA	UGA	KEN	LSU	MSU	MIZZ	MISS	SCAR	TENN	TAMU	VAN	Team	Div	SR	SW
ALA	15–14		1–2	2–1	0–3	.	2–1	1–1	1–2	.	3–0	1–2	2–1	2–1	.	ALA	W5	5–4	1–1
ARK	16–14	2–1		1–2	1–2	.	.	1–2	1–2	3–0	1–2	2–1	.	2–1	2–1	ARK	W4	5–5	1–0
AUB	10–20	1–2	2–1		.	.	1–2	0–3	0–3	1–2	0–3	1–2	2–1	2–1	.	AUB	W7	3–7	0–3
FLA	21–9	3–0	2–1	.		3–0	1–2	3–0	.	3–0	.	2–1	2–1	1–2	1–2	FLA	E1	7–3	4–0
UGA	11–18	.	.	.	0–3		1–2	0–2	1–2	2–1	1–2	2–1	2–1	2–1	0–3	UGA	E6	4–6	0–2
KEN	14–16	1–2	.	2–1	2–1	2–1		.	.	1–2	0–3	2–1	1–2	2–1	1–2	KEN	E4	5–5	0–1
LSU	17–11	1–1	2–1	3–0	0–3	2–0	.		3–0	.	2–1	.	2–1	1–2	1–2	LSU	W2	6–3	2–1
MSU	18–12	2–1	2–1	3–0	.	2–1	.	0–3		3–0	1–2	.	2–1	1–2	2–1	MSU	W3	7–3	2–1
MIZZ	6–24	.	0–3	2–1	0–3	1–2	2–1	.	0–3		0–3	0–3	1–2	.	0–3	MIZZ	E7	2–8	0–6
MISS	19–11	0–3	2–1	3–0	.	2–1	3–0	1–2	2–1	3–0		1–2	.	2–1	.	MISS	W1	7–3	3–1
SCAR	18–12	2–1	1–2	2–1	1–2	1–2	1–2	.	.	3–0	2–1		3–0	.	2–1	SCAR	E2	6–4	2–0
TENN	12–18	1–2	.	1–2	1–2	1–2	2–1	1–2	1–2	2–1	.	0–3		.	2–1	TENN	E5	3–7	0–1
TAMU	14–16	1–2	1–2	1–2	2–1	1–2	1–2	2–1	2–1	.	1–2	.	.		2–1	TAMU	W6	4–6	0–0
VAN	17–13	.	1–2	.	2–1	3–0	2–1	2–1	1–2	3–0	.	1–2	1–2	1–2		VAN	E3	5–5	2–0
Team	W–L	ALA	ARK	AUB	FLA	UGA	KEN	LSU	MSU	MIZZ	MISS	SCAR	TENN	TAMU	VAN	Team	Div	SR	SW

Updated for entire regular season. Georgia at LSU had a tie game.

== Rankings ==
Ranking movements Legend: ██ Increase in ranking ██ Decrease in ranking — = Not ranked
	Week																		
Poll	Pre	1	2	3	4	5	6	7	8	9	10	11	12	13	14	15	16	17	Final
Coaches'	4	4*	4*	20	20	19	16	12	21	—	22	24	21	21	22	21	21*	21*	—
Baseball America	8	7	18	12	24	21	16	9	17	24	20	—	21	20	18	17	17*	17*	—
Collegiate Baseball^	2	2	18	14	23	24	16	10	21	22	20	28	18	16	17	21	28	28	28
NCBWA†	4	7	15	12	20	18	15	13	19	22	21	23	21	21	21	22	28	28*	28

^ Collegiate Baseball ranked 40 teams in their preseason poll, but only ranked 30 teams weekly during the season.
† NCBWA ranks 30 teams in their preseason poll, but only ranks 25 teams weekly during the season.
* A new poll was not released for this week, so for comparison purposes, the previous week's ranking is inserted in this week's slot.
