= 2014 Ole Miss Rebels baseball team =

American college baseball season

2014 Ole Miss Rebels baseball

SEC Western Division champion Oxford Regional champion Lafayette Super Regional champion

College World Series, T-3rd Place
- Conference: Southeastern Conference

Ranking
- Coaches: No. 4
- CB: No. 4
- Record: 48–21 (19–11 SEC)
- Head coach: Mike Bianco (14th season)
- Assistant coach: Stephen Head (1st season)
- Hitting coach: Cliff Godwin (4th season)
- Pitching coach: Carl Lafferty (8th season)
- Home stadium: Swayze Field

2014 Southeastern Conference baseball standings
	Conf.						Overall
Team	W		L		T	PCT	W		L		T	PCT
Eastern
No. 24 Florida ^{x}‍†‍‍^{y}	21	–	9	–	0	.700	40	–	23	–	0	.635
No. 25 South Carolina ‍‍‍^{y}	18	–	12	–	0	.600	44	–	18	–	0	.710
No. 1 Vanderbilt ‍‍‍^{y}	17	–	13	–	0	.567	51	–	21	–	0	.708
Kentucky ‍‍‍^{y}	14	–	16	–	0	.467	37	–	25	–	0	.597
Tennessee ‍‍‍	12	–	18	–	0	.400	31	–	23	–	0	.574
Georgia ‍‍‍	11	–	18	–	1	.383	26	–	29	–	1	.473
Missouri ‍‍‍	6	–	24	–	0	.200	20	–	33	–	0	.377
Western
No. 4 Ole Miss ^{x}‍‍‍^{y}	19	–	11	–	0	.633	48	–	21	–	0	.696
No. 21 LSU ‍‍‡‍^{y}	17	–	11	–	1	.603	46	–	16	–	1	.738
No. 28 Mississippi State ‍‍‍^{y}	18	–	12	–	0	.600	39	–	24	–	0	.619
No. 30 Arkansas ‍‍‍^{y}	16	–	14	–	0	.533	40	–	25	–	0	.615
Alabama ‍‍‍^{y}	15	–	14	–	0	.517	37	–	24	–	0	.607
Texas A&M ‍‍‍^{y}	14	–	16	–	0	.467	36	–	26	–	0	.581
Auburn ‍‍‍	10	–	20	–	0	.333	28	–	28	–	0	.500
x – Division champion † – Conference champion ‡ – Tournament champion y – Invited to the NCAA tournament Rankings from Collegiate Baseball

The 2014 Ole Miss Rebels baseball team represented the University of Mississippi, familiarly known as Ole Miss, in the 2014 NCAA Division I baseball season. The Rebels were led by 14th-year head coach Mike Bianco, and played their home games in Oxford at Swayze Field, adjacent to campus. They compete in the Southeastern Conference's Western Division, and won their division in 2014.

The Rebels hosted an NCAA regional and defeated the #13 Washington Huskies twice in one-run games to finish undefeated. In the Super Regional at Louisiana-Lafayette, Ole Miss won in three games to advance to the College World Series, their first since 1972. The Rebels reached the semifinals and lost twice to Virginia. Ole Miss lost their opener by a run, then eliminated Texas Tech and TCU to reach the semifinals, but fell again to Virginia.

== Personnel ==
=== Roster ===
2014 Ole Miss Rebels roster
Pitchers: 2 – Jacob Waguespack – Sophomore; 10 – Chris Ellis – Junior; 16 – Matt Denny – Sophomore; 20 – Josh Laxer – Junior; 21 – Hawtin Buchanan – Junior; 29 – Sam Smith – Junior; 31 – Cheyne Bickel – Freshman; 32 – Austin Blunt – Senior; 35 – Jeremy Massie – Senior; 38 – Wyatt Short – Freshman; 40 – Scott Weathersby – (redshirt) Junior; 41 – Preston Tarkington – (redshirt) Sophomore; 44 – Aaron Greenwood – Senior; 45 – Scott Ashford – Senior; 47 – Christian Trent – (redshirt) Sophomore; 55 – Evan Anderson – Freshman; 65 – Gary Henry- Freshman	Catchers: 13 – Austin Knight – Junior; 22 – Henri Lartigue – Freshman; 30 – Will Allen – Senior; 42 – Holt Perdzock – Sophomore; Infielders: 1 – Preston Overbey – Senior; 6 – Errol Robinson – Freshman; 7 – Dalton Dulin – Freshman; 8 – Austin Anderson – Senior; 17 – Kyle Toth – Junior; 24 – Sikes Orvis – Junior; 25 – Colby Bortles – Freshman; 28 – Brantley Bell – Freshman; 36 – John Gatlin – (redshirt) Senior	Outfielders: 4 – Will Jamison – Junior; 9 – Auston Bousfield – Junior; 11 – Braxton Lee – Junior; 12 – J. B. Woodman – Freshman; 14 – Cameron Dishon – Sophomore; 19 – Peyton Attaway – Freshman

=== Coaches ===
2014 Ole Miss Rebels baseball coaching staff
- 5 – Mike Bianco – Head coach
- 23 – Cliff Godwin – Assistant coach
- 15 – Carl Lafferty – Assistant coach
- 18 – Stephen Head – Volunteer assistant coach

== Schedule ==
2014 Ole Miss Rebels baseball game log: 48–21
Regular season (40–16)

February (9–1)
Date	Opponent	Rank	Site/stadium	Score	Win	Loss	Save	Attendance	Overall record	SEC record
Feb 14	@ Stetson	No. 30	Melching Field at Conrad Park • DeLand, FL	W 7–0	Ellis (1–0)	Schluter (0–1)	None	932	1–0	—
Feb 15	@ Stetson	No. 30	Melching Field at Conrad Park • DeLand, FL	W 11–1	Trent (1–0)	Perez (0–1)	None	975	2–0	—
Feb 16	@ Stetson	No. 30	Melching Field at Conrad Park • DeLand, FL	W 8–2	Smith (1–0)	Powers (0–1)	None	845	3–0	—
Feb 19	Tennessee–Martin	No. 27	Swayze Field • Oxford, MS	W 6–0	Waguespack (1–0)	Boshers (0–1)	None	6,960	4–0	—
Feb 21	Georgia State	No. 27	Swayze Field • Oxford, MS	W 3–0	Ellis (2–0)	Bates (0–1)	None	9,042	5–0	—
Feb 22	Georgia State	No. 27	Swayze Field • Oxford, MS	W 9–1	Trent (2–0)	Fessler (0–1)	None	9,157	6–0	—
Feb 23	Georgia State	No. 27	Swayze Field • Oxford, MS	L 4–6	Rose (1–0)	Bickel (0–1)	None	7,164	6–1	—
Feb 25	Louisiana–Monroe	No. 25	Swayze Field • Oxford, MS	W 5–4	Short (1–0)	Bray (1–1)	None	6,089	7–1	—
Feb 26	Louisiana–Monroe	No. 25	Swayze Field • Oxford, MS	W 4–3	Bickel (1–1)	Taylor (0–1)	None	5,657	8–1	—
Feb 28	UCF	No. 25	Swayze Field • Oxford, MS	W 4–3^{13}	Bickel (2–1)	Thomas (1–2)	None	5,903	9–1	—

March (12–7)
Date	Opponent	Rank	Site/stadium	Score	Win	Loss	Save	Attendance	Overall record	SEC record
Mar 1	UCF	No. 25	Swayze Field • Oxford, MS	W 5–4^{10}	Short (2–0)	Thompson (0–1)	None	8,239	10–1	—
Mar 2	UCF	No. 25	Swayze Field • Oxford, MS	W 9–2	Smith (2–0)	Howell (0–1)	None	6,035	11–1	—
Mar 5	Memphis	No. 18	Swayze Field • Oxford, MS	L 1–4	Wallingford (3–0)	Massie (0–1)	Blackwood (3)	6,629	11–2	—
Mar 7	Arkansas–Little Rock	No. 18	Swayze Field • Oxford, MS	W 2–1^{10}	Laxer (1–0)	Harbin (2–1)	None	6,579	12–2	—
Mar 8	Arkansas–Little Rock	No. 18	Swayze Field • Oxford, MS	W 11–5	Greenwood (1–0)	Schlechte (1–1)	None	7,242	13–2	—
Mar 9	Arkansas–Little Rock	No. 18	Swayze Field • Oxford, MS	W 11–1	Smith (3–0)	Allen (1–1)	None	6,234	14–2	—
Mar 11	@ SE Louisiana	No. 16	Pat Kenelly Diamond at Alumni Field • Hammond, LA	W 2–1	Massie (1–1)	Kennel (1–2)	Short (1)	1,415	15–2	—
Mar 12	@ SE Louisiana	No. 16	Pat Kenelly Diamond at Alumni Field • Hammond, LA	W 8–3	Bickel (3–1)	Pickett (0–1)	None	1,375	16–2	—
Mar 14	@ No. 1 South Carolina	No. 16	Carolina Stadium • Columbia, SC	W 6–4	Ellis (3–0)	Montgomery (3–1)	Laxer (1)	7,859	17–2	1–0
Mar 15	@ No. 1 South Carolina	No. 16	Carolina Stadium • Columbia, SC	L 4–5^{10}	Seddon (1–0)	Denny (0–1)	None	7,835	17–3	1–1
Mar 15	@ No. 1 South Carolina	No. 16	Carolina Stadium • Columbia, SC	L 1–3	Crowe (4–0)	Smith (3–1)	Seddon (6)	7,349	17–4	1–2
Mar 19	Arkansas State	No. 16	Swayze Field • Oxford, MS	W 4–3	Weathersby (1–0)	Kibler (0–1)	Laxer (2)	6,716	18–4	—
Mar 21	Missouri	No. 16	Swayze Field • Oxford, MS	W 4–3	Ellis (4–0)	Miles (2–2)	Laxer (3)	9,651	19–4	2–2
Mar 22	Missouri	No. 16	Swayze Field • Oxford, MS	W 7–1	Trent (3–0)	Fairbanks (2–2)	Greenwood (1)	8,149	20–4	3–2
Mar 23	Missouri	No. 16	Swayze Field • Oxford, MS	W 8–3	Short (3–0)	Steele (0–3)	None	6,918	21–4	4–2
Mar 25	Southern Miss	No. 12	Swayze Field • Oxford, MS	L 3–5	Glasshof (2–2)	Massie (1–2)	Roney (7)	3,043	21–5	—
Mar 28	@ Alabama	No. 12	Sewell–Thomas Stadium • Tuscaloosa, AL	L 6–7	Turnbull (3–1)	Weathersby (1–1)	Burrows (2)	3,302	21–6	4–3
Mar 29	@ Alabama	No. 12	Sewell–Thomas Stadium • Tuscaloosa, AL	L 5–6^{10}	Bramblett (2–0)	Short (3–1)	None	4,001	21–7	4–4
Mar 30	@ Alabama	No. 12	Sewell–Thomas Stadium • Tuscaloosa, AL	L 1–3	Keller (5–1)	Smith (3–2)	None	3,575	21–8	4–5

April (12–5)
Date	Opponent	Rank	Site/stadium	Score	Win	Loss	Save	Attendance	Overall record	SEC record
Apr 2	Arkansas–Pine Bluff	No. 20	Swayze Field • Oxford, MS	W 11–1	Anderson (1–0)	Schwartz (2–4)	None	6,783	22–8	—
Apr 4	No. 27 Auburn	No. 20	Swayze Field • Oxford, MS	W 8–5^{13}	Laxer (2–0)	Wade (3–1)	None	9,187	23–8	5–5
Apr 5	No. 27 Auburn	No. 20	Swayze Field • Oxford, MS	W 6–0	Trent (4–0)	Thompson (5–1)	None		24–8	6–5
Apr 5	No. 27 Auburn	No. 20	Swayze Field • Oxford, MS	W 5–1	Smith (4–2)	O'Neal (2–3)	Laxer (4)	10,523	25–8	7–5
Apr 8	@ Memphis	No. 17	FedExPark • Memphis, TN	W 9–1	Massie (2–2)	Garner (0–3)	None	1,637	26–8	—
Apr 9	Murray State	No. 17	Swayze Field • Oxford, MS	W 8–5	Denny (1–1)	Finch (3–3)	Short (2)	6,553	27–8	—
Apr 11	@ No. 21 Mississippi State	No. 17	Dudy Noble Field • Starkville, MS	W 6–1	Ellis (5–0)	Mitchell (5–3)	Short (3)	13,244	28–8	8–5
Apr 12	@ No. 21 Mississippi State	No. 17	Dudy Noble Field • Starkville, MS	L 5–6^{10}	Tatum (1–0)	Laxer (2–1)	None	15,586	28–9	8–6
Apr 13	@ No. 21 Mississippi State	No. 17	Dudy Noble Field • Starkville, MS	W 12–2	Smith (5–2)	Bracewell (2–3)	Massie (1)	10,371	29–9	9–6
Apr 17	No. 14 LSU	No. 13	Swayze Field • Oxford, MS	L 3–4^{13}	Bugg (2–1)	Laxer (2–2)	McCune (2)	9.861	29–10	9–7
Apr 18	No. 14 LSU	No. 13	Swayze Field • Oxford, MS	W 5–1	Trent (5–0)	Poche (6–3)	None	10,061	30–10	10–7
Apr 19	No. 14 LSU	No. 13	Swayze Field • Oxford, MS	L 0–2	Devall (1–0)	Smith (5–3)	McCune (3)	9,741	30–11	10–8
Apr 22	vs. No. 20 Mississippi State	No. 12	Trustmark Park • Pearl, MS	L 3–8	Tatum (2–0)	Tarkington (0–1)	None	8,496	30–12	—
Apr 25	@ No. 21 Kentucky	No. 12	Cliff Hagan Stadium • Lexington, KY	W 12–4	Ellis (6–0)	Reed (7–2)	None	2,247	31–12	11–8
Apr 26	@ No. 21 Kentucky	No. 12	Cliff Hagan Stadium • Lexington, KY	W 18–5	Trent (6–0)	Dwyer (5–2)	Weathersby (1)	2,474	32–12	12–8
Apr 27	@ No. 21 Kentucky	No. 12	Cliff Hagan Stadium • Lexington, KY	W 9–6	Massie (3–2)	Salow (2–2)	None	2,380	33–12	13–8
Apr 30	Southern Miss	No. 10	Swayze Field • Oxford, MS	L 6–7	Roney (1–0)	Short (3–2)	None	7,655	33–13	—

May (7–3)
Date	Opponent	Rank	Site/stadium	Score	Win	Loss	Save	Attendance	Overall record	SEC record
May 2	Arkansas	No. 10	Swayze Field • Oxford, MS	W 3–2	Ellis (7–0)	Killian (2–8)	Greenwood (2)	9,224	34–13	14–8
May 3	Arkansas	No. 10	Swayze Field • Oxford, MS	W 7–4	Trent (7–0)	Beeks (5–4)	Laxer (5)	9,416	35–13	15–8
May 4	Arkansas	No. 10	Swayze Field • Oxford, MS	L 1–11	Oliver (6–4)	Smith (5–4)	None	7,121	35–14	15–9
May 9	Georgia	No. 13	Swayze Field • Oxford, MS	W 12–2	Ellis (8–0)	Lawlor (4–5)	None	7,781	36–14	16–9
May 10	Georgia	No. 13	Swayze Field • Oxford, MS	L 0–2	Tyler (5–4)	Greenwood (1–1)	None	8,158	36–15	16–10
May 11	Georgia	No. 13	Swayze Field • Oxford, MS	W 2–1^{10}	Massie (4–2)	Cheek (5–5)	None	7,338	37–15	17–10
May 13	@ Arkansas State	No. 13	Tomlinson Stadium–Kell Field • Jonesboro, AR	W 16–9	Anderson (2–0)	Gaines (4–1)	None	1,134	38–15	—
May 15	@ Texas A&M	No. 13	Olsen Field at Blue Bell Park • College Station, TX	W 8–4	Ellis (9–0)	Mengden (4–7)	Greenwood (3)	3,797	39–15	18–10
May 16	@ Texas A&M	No. 13	Olsen Field at Blue Bell Park • College Station, TX	W 4–2	Trent (8–0)	Long (6–2)	Weathersby (2)	4,595	40–15	19–10
May 17	@ Texas A&M	No. 13	Olsen Field at Blue Bell Park • College Station, TX	L 6–9	Minter (2–0)	Massie (4–3)	None	5,474	40–16	19–11

Postseason (8–5)

SEC Tournament (1–2)
Date	Opponent	Seed/Rank	Site/stadium	Score	Win	Loss	Save	Attendance	Overall record	SECT Record
May 21	vs. (7) No. 23 Arkansas	(2) No. 13	Hoover Metropolitan Stadium • Hoover, AL	L 1–2	Oliver (8–4)	Ellis (9–1)	Stone (2)	5,941	40–17	0–1
May 22	vs. (6) No. 18 Vanderbilt	(2) No. 13	Hoover Metropolitan Stadium • Hoover, AL	W 7–2	Greenwood (2–1)	Beede (7–7)	None		41–17	1–1
May 20	vs. (7) No. 23 Arkansas	(2) No. 13	Hoover Metropolitan Stadium • Hoover, AL	L 7–8	Gunn (4–2)	Short (3–3)	Stone (3)		41–18	1–2

NCAA tournament: Oxford Regional (3–0)
Date	Opponent	Seed/Rank	Site/stadium	Score	Win	Loss	Save	Attendance	Overall record	NCAAT record
May 30	(4) Jacksonville State	(1) No. 14	Swayze Field • Oxford, MS	W 12–2	Ellis (10–1)	Fowler (7–8)	None	10,394	42–18	1–0
May 31	(2) No. 13 Washington	(1) No. 14	Swayze Field • Oxford, MS	W 2–1	Trent (9–0)	Brigham (7–4)	Greenwood (4)	9,599	43–18	2–0
June 1	(2) No. 13 Washington	(1) No. 14	Swayze Field • Oxford, MS	W 3–2	Weathersby (2–1)	Nesbitt (0–1)	None	9,396	44–18	3–0

NCAA tournament: Lafayette Super Regional (2–1)
Date	Opponent	Rank	Site/stadium	Score	Win	Loss	Save	Attendance	Overall record	NCAAT record
June 6	(6) No. 1 Louisiana–Lafayette	No. 6	M. L. Tigue Moore Field • Lafayette, LA	L 5–9	Robichaux (8–3)	Ellis (10–2)	None	4,278	44–19	3–1
June 7	(6) No. 1 Louisiana–Lafayette	No. 6	M. L. Tigue Moore Field • Lafayette, LA	W 5–2	Greenwood (3–1)	Baranik (11–2)	None	4,294	45–19	4–1
June 8	(6) No. 1 Louisiana–Lafayette	No. 6	M. L. Tigue Moore Field • Lafayette, LA	W 10–4	Weathersby (3–1)	Boutte (9–1)	Laxer (6)	4,295	46–19	5–1

College World Series (2–2)
Date	Opponent	Rank	Site/stadium	Score	Win	Loss	Save	Attendance	Overall record	CWS record
June 15	(3) No. 1 Virginia	No. 4	TD Ameritrade Park • Omaha, NE	L 1–2	Lewicki (7–1)	Greenwood (3–2)	None	23,393	46–20	0–1
June 17	No. 7 Texas Tech	No. 4	TD Ameritrade Park • Omaha, NE	W 2–1	Weathersby (4–1)	Smith (8–3)	None	18,828	47–20	1–1
June 19	(7) No. 2 TCU	No. 4	TD Ameritrade Park • Omaha, NE	W 6–4	Laxer (3–2)	Kipper (8–3)	Greenwood (5)	25,783	48–20	2–1
June 21	(3) No. 1 Virginia	No. 4	TD Ameritrade Park • Omaha, NE	L 1–4	Sborz (6–4)	Ellis (10–3)	Howard (20)	22,924	48–21	2–2

== Record vs. conference opponents ==
Last two do not qualify for conf. tourn. Blank are not scheduled. Blue are home games, otherwise away.

2014 SEC baseball records Source: 2014 SEC baseball game results
Team	W–L	ALA	ARK	AUB	FLA	UGA	KEN	LSU	MSU	MIZZ	MISS	SCAR	TENN	TAMU	VAN	Team	Div	SR	SW
ALA	15–14		1–2	2–1	0–3	.	2–1	1–1	1–2	.	3–0	1–2	2–1	2–1	.	ALA	W5	5–4	1–1
ARK	16–14	2–1		1–2	1–2	.	.	1–2	1–2	3–0	1–2	2–1	.	2–1	2–1	ARK	W4	5–5	1–0
AUB	10–20	1–2	2–1		.	.	1–2	0–3	0–3	1–2	0–3	1–2	2–1	2–1	.	AUB	W7	3–7	0–3
FLA	21–9	3–0	2–1	.		3–0	1–2	3–0	.	3–0	.	2–1	2–1	1–2	1–2	FLA	E1	7–3	4–0
UGA	11–18	.	.	.	0–3		1–2	0–2	1–2	2–1	1–2	2–1	2–1	2–1	0–3	UGA	E6	4–6	0–2
KEN	14–16	1–2	.	2–1	2–1	2–1		.	.	1–2	0–3	2–1	1–2	2–1	1–2	KEN	E4	5–5	0–1
LSU	17–11	1–1	2–1	3–0	0–3	2–0	.		3–0	.	2–1	.	2–1	1–2	1–2	LSU	W2	6–3	2–1
MSU	18–12	2–1	2–1	3–0	.	2–1	.	0–3		3–0	1–2	.	2–1	1–2	2–1	MSU	W3	7–3	2–1
MIZZ	6–24	.	0–3	2–1	0–3	1–2	2–1	.	0–3		0–3	0–3	1–2	.	0–3	MIZZ	E7	2–8	0–6
MISS	19–11	0–3	2–1	3–0	.	2–1	3–0	1–2	2–1	3–0		1–2	.	2–1	.	MISS	W1	7–3	3–1
SCAR	18–12	2–1	1–2	2–1	1–2	1–2	1–2	.	.	3–0	2–1		3–0	.	2–1	SCAR	E2	6–4	2–0
TENN	12–18	1–2	.	1–2	1–2	1–2	2–1	1–2	1–2	2–1	.	0–3		.	2–1	TENN	E5	3–7	0–1
TAMU	14–16	1–2	1–2	1–2	2–1	1–2	1–2	2–1	2–1	.	1–2	.	.		2–1	TAMU	W6	4–6	0–0
VAN	17–13	.	1–2	.	2–1	3–0	2–1	2–1	1–2	3–0	.	1–2	1–2	1–2		VAN	E3	5–5	2–0
Team	W–L	ALA	ARK	AUB	FLA	UGA	KEN	LSU	MSU	MIZZ	MISS	SCAR	TENN	TAMU	VAN	Team	Div	SR	SW

Updated for entire regular season. Georgia at LSU had a tie game.

== Ranking Movements ==
Ranking movements Legend: ██ Increase in ranking ██ Decrease in ranking — = Not ranked
	Week																		
Poll	Pre	1	2	3	4	5	6	7	8	9	10	11	12	13	14	15	16	17	Final
Coaches'	—	—*		15	12	14	9	16	13	10	13	16	14	14	14	17			
Baseball America	—	—	—	25	21	20	13	23	19	13	16	11	11	11	10	12			
Collegiate Baseball^	30	27	25	18	16	16	12	20	17	13	12	10	13	13	13	14	6	4	
NCBWA†	—	26	24	17	14	15	12	18	14	12	18	15	16	16	16	17	8		

^ Collegiate Baseball ranked 40 teams in their preseason poll, but only ranked 30 teams weekly during the season.
† NCBWA ranks 30 teams in their preseason poll, but only ranks 25 teams weekly during the season.
* A new poll was not released for this week, so for comparison purposes, the previous week's ranking is inserted in this week's slot.
