= Karsten Whitson =

American baseball player (born 1991)

Current position
- Title: Pitching coach
- Team: FIU
- Conference: C-USA

Biographical details
- Born: August 25, 1991 (age 35); Chipley, Florida, U.S.

Playing career
- 2011–2014: Florida
- 2014: Lowell Spinners
- Position: Pitcher

Coaching career (HC unless noted)
- 2017–2018: Pensacola State (P)
- 2019–2023: South Florida (P)
- 2024–Present: FIU (P)

Karsten E. Whitson (born August 25, 1991) is an American college baseball coach and former pitcher. He is currently the pitching coach at the Florida International University. Whitson played college baseball at the University of Florida from 2011 to 2014 for head coach Kevin O'Sullivan. He played professionally from 2014 to 2016.

A first round pick in the 2010 Major League Baseball draft out of high school, Whitson opted to attend college, and was considered a top prospect in the 2013 MLB draft until his shoulder surgery. Whitson was drafted by the Washington Nationals in the 37th round of the 2013 draft and by the Boston Red Sox in the 11th round of the 2014 MLB draft.

== Career ==
Whitson attended Chipley High School in Chipley, Florida. As a senior, Whitson pitched to a 0.62 earned run average (ERA) and recorded 123 strikeouts in 55 innings pitched. Baseball America ranked Whitson the third best high school prospect in the United States. He played in the Aflac All-America game and pitched in the Pan American Junior Baseball Championship.

The San Diego Padres selected Whitson in the first round, with the ninth overall selection, of the 2010 Major League Baseball draft. Despite the Padres offering Whitson a signing bonus of $2.1 million, he opted not to sign, surprising the Padres front office. Whitson reportedly asked for $2.7 million, but stated that he felt he was not ready for the challenge of minor league baseball.

Whitson enrolled at the University of Florida, and joined the Florida Gators baseball team, pitching in the Southeastern Conference. As a freshman, Whitson pitched to an 8–1 win–loss record, with a 2.40 ERA and 92 strikeouts in 97 innings. He was named a Freshman All-American by Collegiate Baseball Newspaper.

Whitson pitched to a 4–0 with a 3.51 ERA in 2012 as a sophomore. After the 2012 season, he played collegiate summer baseball with the Orleans Firebirds of the Cape Cod Baseball League. He missed the entire 2013 season due to a shoulder injury that required surgery, which was performed by Dr. James Andrews. His labrum and rotator cuff were undamaged. The Washington Nationals selected Whitson in the 37th round, with the 1,126th overall selection, in the 2013 MLB draft. Whitson did not sign with the Nationals, returning to college for his senior year. Whitson had a 3.86 ERA with the Gators in 2014, making nine starts and five relief appearances.

The Boston Red Sox selected Whitson in the 11th round of the 2014 MLB draft. He signed on June 20. He pitched for the Lowell Spinners of the Low–A New York–Penn League in 2014.

== Personal ==
Whitson's parents both graduated from the University of Florida.
