= List of Kentucky Wildcats head baseball coaches =

The Kentucky Wildcats college baseball team represents the University of Kentucky in the East Division of the Southeastern Conference (SEC). The Wildcats compete as part of the National Collegiate Athletic Association Division I. As of 2023, the team has had 26 head coaches since it started playing organized baseball in the 1896 season.

== Key ==
General
#	Number of coaches (Note: A running total of the number of head coaches.)
GC	Games coached
†	Elected to the National College Baseball Hall of Fame

Overall
OW	Wins
OL	Losses
OT	Ties
O%	Winning percentage

Conference (Note: Kentucky was a member of the Southern Intercollegiate Athletic Association from 1896 until 1921. They joined the Southern Conference in 1921 and the Southeastern Conference in 1932.)
CW	Wins
CL	Losses
CT	Ties
C%	Winning percentage

Postseason (Note: Postseason play involving the NCAA Division I Baseball Championship.)
PA	Total Appearances (Note: Postseason appearances include seasons with NCAA Division I Baseball Championship bids since the tournament began in 1947.)
PW	Total Wins
PL	Total Losses
WA	College World Series appearances (Note: College World Series appearances include seasons with CWS bids since the tournament began in 1947.)
WW	College World Series wins
WL	College World Series losses

Championships
DC	Division regular season (Note: From 1959–1985 the west division finish is listed.)
CC	Conference regular season
CT	Conference tournament (Note: The SEC began a baseball tournament in 1977.)

== Coaches ==
List of head baseball coaches showing season(s) coached, overall records, conference records, postseason records, championships and selected awards*Statistics correct as of the end of the 2019 NCAA Division I baseball season
#	Name	Term (Note: Kentucky did not sponsor a baseball team in 1932-33, 1935-38 & 1943-45.)	GC	OW	OL	OT	O%	CW	CL	CT	C%	PA	PW	PL	WA	WW	WL	DCs	CCs	CTs	NCs	Awards (Note: National, regional and conference coach of the year awards.)
1	Unknown	1896–1897	6	1	5	0	.167	—	—	—	—	—	—	—	—	—	—	—	—	—	—	—
2	G. L. Byroade	1903	13	9	4	0	.692	—	—	—	—	—	—	—	—	—	—	—	—	—	—	—
3	A. A. Gordon	1904	18	7	10	1	.417	—	—	—	—	—	—	—	—	—	—	—	—	—	—	—
4	W. C. Kelly	1905	18	10	8	0	.556	—	—	—	—	—	—	—	—	—	—	—	—	—	—	—
5	H. E. Reed	1906	15	12	2	1	.833	—	—	—	—	—	—	—	—	—	—	—	—	—	—	—
6	F. C. Paullin	1907	15	12	3	0	.800	—	—	—	—	—	—	—	—	—	—	—	—	—	—	—
7	C. M. Leaphart	1908	18	12	5	1	.694	—	—	—	—	—	—	—	—	—	—	—	—	—	—	—
8	Unknown	1909–1910	37	21	16	1	.568	—	—	—	—	—	—	—	—	—	—	—	—	—	—	—
9	Frank Engel	1911–1913	40	26	12	2	.675	—	—	—	—	—	—	—	—	—	—	—	—	—	—	—
10	Alpha Brumage	1914–1915	30	16	13	1	.550	—	—	—	—	—	—	—	—	—	—	—	—	—	—	—
11	Bill Tuttle	1916	11	7	4	0	.636	—	—	—	—	—	—	—	—	—	—	—	—	—	—	—
12	J. B. Fledge	1917	7	6	1	0	.857	—	—	—	—	—	—	—	—	—	—	—	—	—	—	—
13	Unknown	1918–1919	20	16	4	0	.800	—	—	—	—	—	—	—	—	—	—	—	—	—	—	—
14	Thomas Andrew Gill	1920–1921	26	18	8	0	.692	—	—	—	—	—	—	—	—	—	—	—	—	—	—	—
15	Jim Park	1922	15	7	9	0	.438	—	—	—	—	—	—	—	—	—	—	—	—	—	—	—
16	Cy Barger	1924	24	12	12	0	.500	—	—	—	—	—	—	—	—	—	—	—	—	—	—	—
17	Fred J. Murphy	1925–1926	24	9	14	2	.400	—	—	—	—	—	—	—	—	—	—	—	—	—	—	—
18	John Devereaux	1927, 1929–1931, 1934	61	28	31	2	.475	—	—	—	—	—	—	—	—	—	—	—	—	—	—	—
19	Fred Major	1928	14	7	6	1	.536	—	—	—	—	—	—	—	—	—	—	—	—	—	—	—
20	Frank Moseley	1939–1941, 1946, 1948–1950	116	60	55	1	.522	40	32	0	.556	—	—	—	—	—	—	—	—	—	—	—
21	Bill Black	1942	13	7	6	0	.538	2	4	0	.333	—	—	—	—	—	—	—	—	—	—	—
22	Harry Lancaster	1947, 1951–1965	329	163	163	3	.500	93	128	1	.419	—	—	—	—	—	—	—	—	—	—	—
23	Abe Shannon	1966–1969	105	45	60	0	.429	26	34	0	.433	—	—	—	—	—	—	—	—	—	—	—
24	Dick Parsons	1970–1972	86	42	43	1	.494	13	28	0	.317	—	—	—	—	—	—	—	—	—	—	—
25	Jordan E. Horne	1973–1978	254	127	126	1	.502	48	64	0	.429	—	—	—	—	—	—	—	—	—	—	—
26	Keith Madison	1979–2003	1378	735	638	5	.535	246	386	3	.387	2	3	4	—	—	—	—	—	—	—	—
27	John Cohen	2004–2008	288	175	112	1	.610	63	85	1	.423	2	4	4	—	—	—	—	1	—	—	SEC (2006)
28	Gary Henderson	2009–2016	457	258	199	0	.564	104	144	0	.419	2	4	4	—	—	—	—	—	—	—	SEC (2012)
29	Nick Mingione	2017–present	529	322	207	0	.609	123	138	0	.471	4	18	12	1	1	2	1	1	—	—	SEC (2017, 2024)
