= Cliff Hagan Stadium =

Baseball park at the University of Kentucky

Coordinates: 38.02762°N 84.49872°W

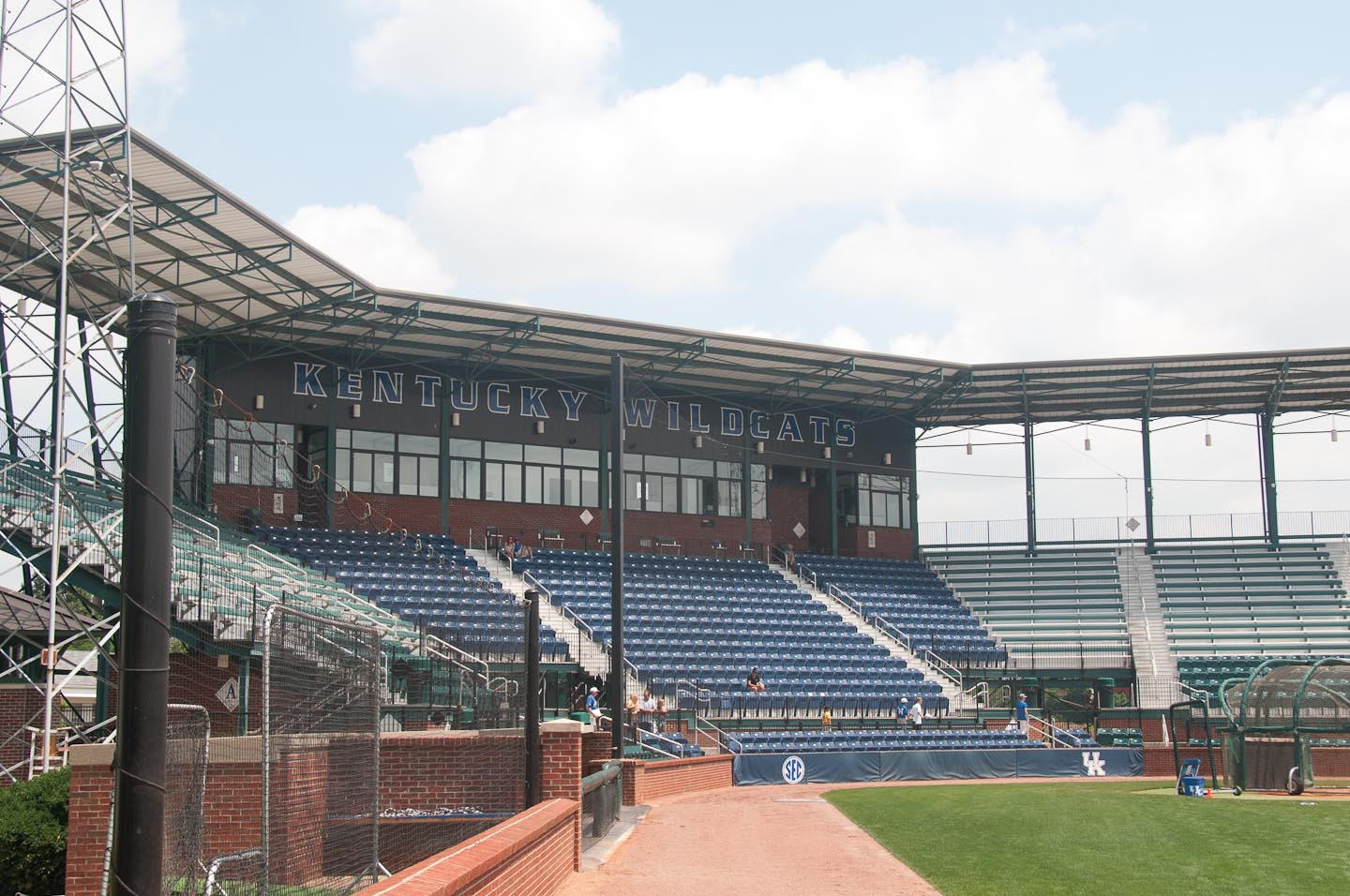
- Interactive map of Cliff Hagan Stadium
- Former names: Bernie A. Shively Sports Center (1969-1993)
- Location: 700 Jerry Claiborne Way; Lexington, Kentucky 40506
- Owner: University of Kentucky
- Operator: University of Kentucky
- Capacity: 3,000
- Surface: Grass
- Field size: Left Field: 340 feet Left Center: 365 feet Center Field: 390 feet Right Center: 350 feet Right Field: 310 feet

Construction
- Groundbreaking: 1968
- Opened: 1969 (renovated 1990, 2002)
- Closed: 2018
- Demolished: 2023
- Cost: USD4.2 million (2002 renovation)

Tenant
- Kentucky Wildcats (NCAA) (1969-2018)

Cliff Hagan Stadium (Officially named Shively Field at Cliff Hagan Stadium) was a baseball stadium located in Lexington, Kentucky, United States. Cliff Hagan Stadium or better known to Kentucky Wildcat baseball fans as "The Cliff" is on the southwest side of the university's campus, two blocks away from Kroger Field. Since its opening in 1969, the University of Kentucky Baseball called this place home for just under 50 years. The Wildcats then opened a $49 million baseball stadium called Kentucky Proud Park in 2019. Cliff Hagan Stadium had 7 coaches during its time and 15 All Americans. The stadium was renamed in 1993 in honor of Cliff Hagan, the Basketball Hall of Famer who had played at Kentucky during the 1950s under Adolph Rupp and returned to Kentucky as athletic director after his professional basketball playing days. It was extensively renovated in 2002. Following its final 2018 season, while construction was ongoing on its nearby replacement, it was used for UK baseball summer camps. In 2023, "The Cliff" was torn down to make way for the university's indoor track and field complex.

In the wake of the Wildcats' surprising success in the 2006 season, which saw them win a regular-season Southeastern Conference title for the first time in over 30 years, coach John Cohen was signed to a five-year contract extension. Cohen left the program at the end of the 2008 season for his alma mater Mississippi State, where he served as athletic director from 2016 to 2022. His assistant Gary Henderson was then given the head coaching job.

== Reuse of stadium site ==
Cliff Hagan stadium held its last game on May 13, 2018. Following the 2018 season and the stadiums closing summer camps were held at "The Cliff" for one more summer. But, in 2019 the University of Kentucky totally abandoned this stadium even through having a 4.2 million. dollar renovation in 2002. It was later demolished and the land was used for the Jim Green Indoor Track and Field Center.

== Stadium records ==
- Longest Winning Streak: 12 (2012)
- Most Runs Scored by UK: 27 vs. Tennessee-Martin (March 10, 2007)
- Most Runs Scored by Both Teams: 44 - Mississippi State 28, Kentucky 16 (1989)
- SEC Series Sweeps (3-game series): 12
- SEC Series Wins (3-game series): 45

== All-Americans ==
University of Kentucky Players
| Year | Player | Position |
|---|---|---|
| 1976 | Jimmy Sherrill | OF |
| 1981 | Jeff Keener | P |
| 1987 | Terry Shumpert | 2B |
| 1988 | Chris Estep | OF |
| 1991 | Rick Norton | 3B |
| 1993 | Brad Hindersman | DH |
| 1994 | Jeff Abbott | OF |
| 1996 | Chad Green | OF |
| 1996 | Sam White | 2B |
| 1999 | John Wilson | C |
| 2006 | Ryan Strieby | 1B |
| 2007 | Sean Coughlin | C |
| 2008 | Sawyer Carroll | OF |
| 2008 | Collin Cowgill | OF |
| 2014 | A.J. Reed | 1B |

== List of coaches at Cliff Hagan Stadium ==
| Name | Years |
|---|---|
| Nick Mingione | 2017–Present |
| Gary Henderson | 2009-2016 |
| John Cohen | 2004-2008 |
| Keith Madison | 1979-2003 |
| Jordan Horne | 1973-1978 |
| Dick Parsons | 1970-1972 |
| Abe Shannon | 1966-1969 |
