= Kentucky Wildcats =

Intercollegiate sports teams of the University of Kentucky

- University: University of Kentucky
- Nickname: Wildcats
- NCAA: Division I (FBS)
- Conference: SEC (primary) (Note: Kentucky Wildcats teams compete in the Southeastern Conference for all sports excluding men's soccer, women's stunt, and rifle, which respectively compete in Sun Belt Conference, as an independent, and in the Great America Rifle Conference.); Sun Belt (men's soccer); Great America Rifle Conference
- Athletic director: J Batt
- Location: Lexington, Kentucky
- Varsity teams: 25
- Football stadium: Kroger Field
- Basketball arena: Rupp Arena (men); Memorial Coliseum (women)
- Baseball stadium: Kentucky Proud Park
- Softball stadium: John Cropp Stadium
- Volleyball arena: Memorial Coliseum
- Colors: Blue and white
- Mascot: Blue, Scratch, and The Wildcat
- Fight song: On, On, U of K, Kentucky Fight
- Website: ukathletics.com
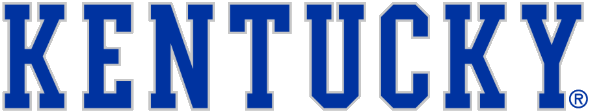

Team NCAA championships
- 14

SEC logo in Kentucky's colors

The Kentucky Wildcats are the men's and women's intercollegiate athletic squads of the University of Kentucky (UK), a founding member of the Southeastern Conference. The Kentucky Wildcats is the student body of the University of Kentucky. 30,473 students attend the university. Historically, the women's teams and athletes were referred to as the "Lady Kats", but all athletic squads adopted the "Wildcats" nickname in 1995. Collectively, the fans of the Kentucky Wildcats are often referred to as the Big Blue Nation. Their main and most intense rival is the University of Louisville. The Wildcats are composed of 25 varsity teams that compete nationally—23 in NCAA-recognized sports, plus the cheerleading squad and dance team.

On April 25, 2025, the UK board of trustees approved a proposal to transfer the athletic department to a non-profit company to be known as Champions Blue, LLC. Articles of incorporation for Champions Blue had been filed on April 17. Both UK and outside media characterized this move, considered to be the first by a major U.S. university, as a response to the impending settlement of the House v. NCAA legal case, which is expected to establish revenue sharing between athletic programs and student athletes. Champions Blue will be chaired by the UK president, with its board otherwise consisting of "outside experts" which will regularly meet with the president and athletic director.

== Background ==
The nickname "Wildcats" became synonymous with UK shortly after a 6–2 football road victory over Illinois on October 9, 1909. Commandant Philip W. Corbusier, then head of the military department at old State University, told a group of students in a chapel service following the game that the Kentucky football team had "fought like Wildcats". Later the name Wildcats became more and more popular among UK followers as well as with members of the media. As a result, the nickname was adopted by the university.

The university adopted blue and white as its official colors in 1892. Originally, however, UK students had decided on blue and light yellow prior to the Kentucky-Centre College football game on December 19, 1887. The shade of blue, which is close to a royal blue, was chosen when a student asked the question, "What color blue?" At the time, Richard C. Stoll (who lettered in football at UK in 1889–94) pulled off his necktie and held it up. The students then adopted that particular shade of blue. A year later, UK students officially dropped the light yellow color for white because the two colors did not look good together.

== Sports sponsored ==
Men's sports	Women's sports
Baseball	Basketball
Basketball	Cross country
Cross country	Golf
Football	Gymnastics
Golf	Softball
Soccer	Soccer
Swimming & diving	Stunt
Tennis	Swimming & diving
Track & field^{†}	Tennis
	Track & field^{†}
	Volleyball
Co-ed sports
Rifle
† – Track and field includes both indoor and outdoor.

UK has won 13 national championships including the 2012 men's basketball title. UK also boasts the 1988 women's cross country national championship; 2020–21 women's volleyball championship; 2011, 2018, and 2021 rifle championships, and 8 men's basketball titles. UK was also crowned an NCAA co-champion, after knocking off #1 Oklahoma in the 1951 Sugar Bowl to win the 1950 National Championship in college football.

=== Basketball ===
Beginning in the 1890s, students at the University of Kentucky started scheduling football games with neighboring colleges. The basketball program began on campus in 1902, originally as a women's sport; a men's team was added one year later. Several decades later, in 1930, then-high school coach Adolph Rupp was hired as a basketball coach for the university, a career that would span over 40 years until 1972. During his tenure, he led the Kentucky Wildcats to four NCAA crowns in 1948, 1949, 1951 and 1958. The Wildcats later won a fifth championship under Joe B. Hall in 1978, another in 1996 under Rick Pitino, in 1998 under Orlando "Tubby" Smith, and its most recent in 2012 under Coach John Calipari. Mark Pope is currently the head coach of the Wildcats, hired after Calipari's departure to Arkansas in 2024.

In 2007, the university unveiled the Joe Craft Center, a $30 million state-of-the-art basketball practice facility for both the men's and women's teams, named after businessman and philanthropist Kentuckian Joe Craft.

==== Men's ====
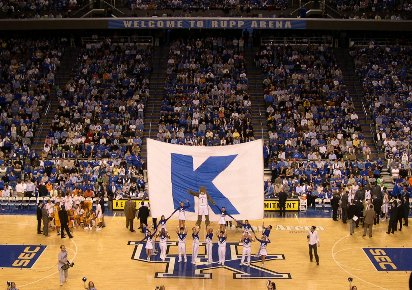
The Kentucky cheerleaders at Rupp Arena during a basketball game

Considered to be an elite NCAA basketball program, the University of Kentucky men's basketball team is the winningest program in the history of college basketball. The team was the first ever Division I squad to reach 2,000 victories after defeating Drexel University on December 21, 2009. Kentucky also leads all NCAA schools in all-time winning percentage (.762) with an all-time record of 2111–661.

The men's team has earned a total of eight NCAA Men's Division I Basketball Championships, second only to UCLA's eleven championships. UK's eight championships were won by five different coaches – Adolph Rupp in 1948, 1949, 1951 and 1958, Joe B. Hall in 1978, Rick Pitino in 1996, Tubby Smith in 1998, and John Calipari in 2012. Kentucky's 1933 and 1954 teams were also awarded the Helms national championship, and his 1934, 1947, and 1948 teams were retroactively recognized as the national champion by the Premo-Porretta Power Poll. The Wildcats also won two NIT Championships in 1946 and 1976. The program has garnered 45 SEC regular season titles. Since the 2009–10 season, John Calipari has coached the Wildcats with a "one-and-done" approach to recruiting, resulting in freshman-laden lineups – including a record 5 first-round draft picks in the 2010 NBA draft and 6 Wildcats taken in the 2012 NBA draft.

==== Women's ====
The first University of Kentucky women's basketball team was organized in 1902, competing for the first time on February 21, 1903. However, in 1924, the University Senate passed a bill to abolish women's basketball in part because "basketball had proven to be a strenuous sport for boys and therefore was too strenuous for girls." After a 50-year absence, women's basketball finally reached varsity status in 1974. The team was given the nickname "Lady Kats" and was coached by Debbie Yow.

Led by UK all-time leading scorer Valerie Still, Patty Jo Hedges, and Lea Wise, the Lady Kats won the SEC Tournament in 1982. The following year, the same trio led the team to a #4 ranking in the country, the highest in the team's history.

The team was previously coached by Matthew Mitchell, named as the SEC Coach of the Year in 2010 after leading the 2009–10 team to a surprising 28–8 season in which they set school records for best start, most consecutive SEC wins, best SEC finish, and most wins in a season, culminating in their first NCAA regional final since 1982. The team also had the conference Player of the Year in Victoria Dunlap and Freshman of the Year in A'dia Mathies.

Under later coach Kyra Elzy, the Wildcats upset top-ranked South Carolina in the 2022 SEC Women's Basketball Tournament finals. The star of this team, Rhyne Howard, would become the first overall pick in that year's WNBA draft. Elzy would be dismissed after the 2023–24 season.

The current head coach, Kenny Brooks, was hired away from Virginia Tech shortly after Elzy's firing.

=== Football ===
Kentucky plays at Kroger Field (formerly Commonwealth Stadium from 1973 to 2017), which replaced Stoll Field in 1973.

Paul "Bear" Bryant era

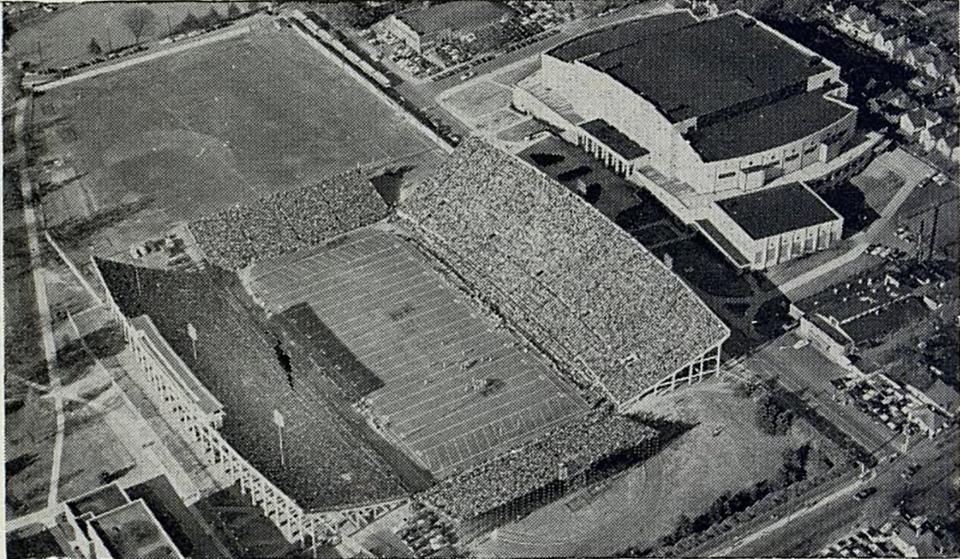
Stoll Field/McLean Stadium and Memorial Coliseum, c. 1956

Paul "Bear" Bryant was Kentucky's head football coach for eight seasons. Under Bryant the Wildcats won the 1947 Great Lakes Bowl, lost the 1950 Orange Bowl, won the 1951 Sugar Bowl and the 1952 Cotton Bowl Classic. In final AP polls, the Wildcats were ranked #11 in 1949, #7 in 1950, #15 in 1951, #20 in 1952 and #16 in 1953.

At the time of the 1951 Sugar Bowl win over #1 Oklahoma, the final polls were taken before the bowl games. The NCAA has never officially recognized a national champion from among the bowl coalition institutions, but in 2004 the NCAA commissioned Jeff Sagarin to use his computer model to retroactively determine the highest ranked teams for the years prior to the BCS. His champion for the 1950 season is Kentucky.

Fran Curci era

The 1976 Wildcats retroactively claimed a share of the Southeastern Conference championship under coach Fran Curci via a loss later forfeited by Mississippi State (and despite losing at home to conference champion Georgia) and won the Peach Bowl, finishing #18 in the final AP poll. The 1977 Kentucky team went 10–1 and was undefeated in SEC play but, despite finishing the season ranked #6 in the AP poll, did not play in a bowl game due to NCAA sanctions. Kentucky finished at #6 and Penn State at #5 despite the fact that Kentucky defeated Penn State at Penn State during the regular season.

Jerry Claiborne era

Coach Jerry Claiborne led the Wildcats to the 1983 Hall of Fame Bowl. In 1984 Kentucky returned to the Hall of Fame Bowl and defeated a ranked Wisconsin team to finish the season with a 9–3 record and a #19 ranking in the final AP poll.

Bill Curry era

The Wildcats played in the 1993 Peach Bowl under coach Bill Curry.

Hal Mumme era

Coach Hal Mumme led the Wildcats to the 1998 Outback Bowl and the 1999 Music City Bowl but the program was hit with severe sanctions for infractions during Mumme's tenure.

Guy Morriss era

Under coach Guy Morriss the Wildcats posted a 7–5 record in 2002 but were not eligible for postseason play due to NCAA sanctions.

Rich Brooks era

Coach Rich Brooks led the team to an 8–5 regular season record in 2006, including a memorable upset over the defending SEC champion Georgia, snapping a nine-game losing streak to the Bulldogs. Brooks also led the football team to its first bowl game since 1999 and its first bowl game victory since 1984, as Kentucky defeated the Clemson University Tigers 28–20 in the 2006 Music City Bowl. On September 15, 2007. Brooks led UK to a 40–34 win over number 9 ranked Louisville. This marked UK's first win over a top 10 team since #4 Penn State in 1977. The Wildcats were ranked 8th in the nation before a loss to South Carolina on October 4. After the loss to South Carolina, Kentucky bounced back on October 13 to defeat #1 LSU in an historic triple overtime game.

The 2007 Kentucky Wildcats football defeated the Florida State Seminoles 35–28 in the 2007 Music City Bowl in Nashville, Tennessee, on December 31, 2007. It was the Wildcats second straight bowl appearance. Quarterback Andre' Woodson was named the Music City Bowl MVP for the second year in a row. The last three bowl appearances for the Cats have been in the Music City Bowl, which they have appeared in more than any other SEC team in the conference's affiliation with the game, which dates back to the inaugural game in 1998.

On January 2, 2009, Kentucky football set a record with the school's first back to back to back bowl games. After a bad start in the Liberty Bowl, Kentucky made a comeback from a 16–3 deficit at halftime to beat East Carolina 25–19. After a fumble by the East Carolina running back, UK Defensive Tackle Ventrell Jenkins returned the ball over 50 yards for the score that gave Kentucky their first lead of the game.

Joker Phillips era

Former Wildcat wide receiver and longtime assistant coach Joker Phillips was formally named head coach January 6, 2010 after Brooks' retirement. Phillips took Kentucky to the BBVA Compass Bowl in Birmingham, Alabama in his first season as a head coach, losing to Big East Conference co-champion Pittsburgh 27–10. However, the Wildcats would not return to a bowl in either of the next two seasons. The main highlight of those years came in 2011, when Kentucky defeated Tennessee for the first time since 1984. Phillips was fired in November 2012, effective at season's end.

Mark Stoops era

Phillips was replaced by Florida State defensive coordinator Mark Stoops, younger brother of Oklahoma head coach Bob Stoops. Stoops has gone on to become the winningest coach in Kentucky's history. In 2018, Stoops and Kentucky had arguably the best season in program history going 10–3 and beating Penn State 27–24 in the 2019 Citrus Bowl which was led by 2019 7th overall pick Josh Hines-Allen and all-time leading rusher Benny Snell. Stoops also led Kentucky to win the Belk Bowl along with the Gator Bowl. After a historic 6–0 start in 2021, the Wildcats lost three games in a row to fall out of contention for the conference title.

=== Baseball ===
The Wildcats baseball team began play in their new stadium, Kentucky Proud Park, in fall 2018, replacing Cliff Hagan Stadium, where they had played since 1969.

The baseball program, partly hampered by being the northernmost school in the heavily warm-weather SEC, has historically achieved only modest success at best. Wildcats baseball hit bottom at the turn of the 21st century, with only one winning season from 1997 through 2004, and last-place finishes in the SEC East division in every season from 2001 through 2005. In 2003, after the retirement of longtime coach Keith Madison, Kentucky hired Florida assistant John Cohen as head coach. Cohen was able to lead the Cats to a winning overall season in 2005, despite another SEC cellar finish. In 2008, Cohen left Kentucky to accept the coaching position at Mississippi State University. He was replaced by former Kentucky assistant Gary Henderson.

Few could have expected the season the Cats would have in 2006. They went from worst to first in the SEC, winning a regular-season conference title for the first time in three decades, and being ranked as high as fourth in the country by one major baseball poll during the season. However, the Kentucky fans saw the Cats crash out of the SEC tournament early and fail to make it out of the regionals of the NCAA tournament at home.

In 2012, Kentucky garnered its most successful season ever in program history. Henderson was voted SEC Coach of the Year by the league coaches. Henderson directed the Wildcats to a school-record 45-win season, with UK completing its best finishes in the SEC and NCAA tournaments in school annals. The 2012 season also marked the first time that UK had ever been ranked No. 1. UK finished the season with a No. 11 ranking by Baseball America. UK also achieved a program record by winning seven of ten series in SEC play. UK also ran up a school-record 22-game winning streak, which is the second longest in SEC history.

In 2014, Kentucky produced its first ever College Baseball National Player of the Year in A. J. Reed. During the regular season Reed was 11–2 with a 2.10 earned-run average on the mound and at the plate led the nation in home runs (23)—more than 193 entire Division I teams — slugging percentage (.768) and OPS (1.259). Reed also won SEC Player of the Year honors. The Wildcats made it to the Semifinals of the SEC Tournament and played in the Louisville regional of the 2014 NCAA tournament.

In 2017, Henderson had resigned and was replaced by Nick Mingione, who had been an assistant in the 2006 season. Mingione brought a new attitude to the team and they had a 43–23 record with 19–11 in the SEC. They went on to host an NCAA regional NCAA Regional. The Cats won the Regional and advanced on the Super Regional and were defeated by Louisville. Minione was named SEC coach of the year.

=== Softball ===
The University of Kentucky softball team had their inaugural season in 1997.

University of Kentucky Athletic Director Mitch Barnhart hired Rachel Lawson in July 2007. Since Lawson's hire she has become the winningest coach in program history. She has also guided UK to six NCAA Super Regionals since 2011 including an appearance in the 2014 College World Series, the program's first.

Now sitting at 361–232 in her eleven seasons at Kentucky, Lawson is the winningest head coach in school history and already has more wins in SEC play than UK had total as a program when she took over in 2007. UK also finished 2016 in the top 14 of both collegiate softball rankings for the third time in school history with eleven wins over ranked teams.

Another accomplishment since Lawson's hire in 2007 is the integration of John Cropp Stadium. The facility cost $9.5 million, and debuted for the 2013 season. UK hosted the 2013 SEC Tournament as well as an NCAA regional, another first for the program. Since 2013, UK has hosted an NCAA regional in 2014 and 2016–2018.

=== Track and field ===
Edrick Floréal was hired a UK Track and Field coach in 2012, and has led the Wildcats to 6 NCAA individual championships and 29 individual SEC championships.

Notable track athletes:

- Kendra Harrison – 100 meters hurdles
- Jasmine Quinn – 100 meters hurdles
- Rondel Sorrillo – sprinter
- Dezerea Bryant – sprinter
- Andrew Evans – discus
- Sydney McLaughlin – 400 meters hurdles
- Daniel Roberts – 110 meters hurdles
- Abby Steiner - 200 meters

=== Women's volleyball ===
The Wildcats women's volleyball became an official varsity sport in 1977 and has won the SEC regular season 14 times and won the NCAA championship in 2020. Under coach Craig Skinner, the team has become a national power.

=== Cheerleading and stunt ===
The University of Kentucky cheerleaders have won the UCA (Division I-A) Cheerleading Championship 24 times, more than any other school. They are the only school to win more than two consecutive championships, having won each year from 1995 through 2002 and from 2004 through 2006, and are the only school to win consecutive championships on multiple occasions, having done so four times (1987–1988, 1995–2002, 2004–2006, and 2008–2010). They have won championships in 1985, 1987, 1988, 1992, 1995, 1996, 1997, 1998, 1999, 2000, 2001, 2002, 2004, 2005, 2006, 2008, 2009, 2010, 2012, 2014, 2016, 2017, 2018, and 2019; have also placed second four times, and have finished in the top ten every year since the existence of the UCA National College Championships. The squad has been featured on the "CBS Evening News", Connie Chung's "Eye to Eye", and the "CBS Morning Show", NBC's The Today Show, in "Southern Living" and Gentlemen's Quarterly, "ESPN the Magazine", and "Seventeen" magazines.

A reality show on WE: Women's Entertainment called "Cheerleader U." followed the team during the 2006–07 season.

Although cheerleading as a whole has no NCAA recognition, UK considers it to be a varsity sport. In recent years, UK added a team in stunt (often stylized as STUNT), an emerging all-female cheerleading discipline that emphasizes the sport's acrobatic and technical aspects. The stunt program was initially sponsored at club level until being elevated to varsity status in 2022–23, a year before stunt became part of the NCAA Emerging Sports for Women program.

=== Golf ===
The men's and women's golf teams call the University Club of Kentucky their home course. Notable alumni of the golf team include 1967 Masters tournament winner Gay Brewer, current PGA Tour golfers J. B. Holmes and Steve Flesch, current Champions Tour golfer Russ Cochran, and former Kentucky governor John Y. Brown Jr.

=== Soccer ===
The University of Kentucky fields both men's and women's varsity soccer teams competing in NCAA Division I. Both programs play their home matches at the Wendell & Vickie Bell Soccer Complex in Lexington, Kentucky.

The men's soccer team, established in 1991, competes as an affiliate member of the Sun Belt Conference and has made multiple NCAA Tournament appearances, earning a reputation as a consistent postseason contender.

The women's soccer team competes in the Southeastern Conference (SEC) and has developed into a competitive program within one of the nation's strongest women's soccer conferences, with several NCAA Tournament berths and strong recent seasons.

=== Men's tennis ===
The University of Kentucky Men's Tennis Team is coached by longtime assistant coach and former All-American Cedric Kauffmann. They play their home matches at the Boone Tennis Center since January 1986. They have won the SEC Regular season title twice (1992,2012) and the SEC tournament once (1992)

Notable Kentucky tennis athletes:

- Cedric Kauffmann
- Andy Jackson
- Mario Rincón
- Greg Van Emburgh
- Jesse Witten

=== Rifle ===
The co-ed Rifle team is coached by Harry Mullins. It began as a club sport in 1982. UK is a member of the single-sport Great America Rifle Conference. UK won the team national championship in 2011, as well as the title in smallbore. Individual National Champions include: Nancy Napolski – 1994 Air Rifle, Ethan Settlemires – 2011 Smallbore, Connor Davis – 2014 Air Rifle, Henrik Larsen – 2018 Air Rifle, and Mary Tucker - 2021 Smallbore and 2021 Air Rifle.

Facility: Buell Armory
Head Coach: Harry Mullins
NCAA Appearances: 21
NCAA Team Championships: 4
NCAA Team Runner up: 6
National Individual Champions: 6
NCAA All-Americans: 86
Conference Championships (Regular season): 8
Conference Championships (Tournament): 6

== Championships ==
=== NCAA team championships ===
Kentucky has won 14 NCAA team national championships.

- Men (8)
  - Basketball (8): 1948, 1949, 1951, 1958, 1978, 1996, 1998, 2012
- Women (2)
  - Cross country (1): 1988
  - Volleyball (1): 2020 (Note: Due to COVID-19, the NCAA moved its Division I championships in fall sports, including women's volleyball, from fall 2020 to spring 2021. It labeled the tournament as the "2020" edition, but the season as the "2020–21" season.)
- Co-ed (4)
  - Rifle (4): 2011, 2018, 2021, 2022
- see also
  - SEC NCAA team championships
  - List of NCAA schools with the most NCAA Division I championships

=== Other national team championships ===
The following national team titles were not bestowed by the NCAA:

- Men (2)
  - Basketball (1): 1946 (NIT)
  - Football (1): 1950
- Co-Ed (24)
  - Cheerleading (24): 1985, 1987–88, 1992, 1995–2002, 2004–2006, 2008–2010, 2012, 2014, and 2016–2019.

== Other non varsity sports ==
=== Hockey ===
UK has a men's hockey team that competes at club level, which means that it is student-operated without university assistance, and they compete in the American Collegiate Hockey Association's Division I level.

The University of Kentucky Hockey Team (founded 1984) competes in the American Collegiate Hockey Association. The "Coolcats" play their home games at the Lexington Ice Center. In 1998 the cats released their first poster featuring actress and UK alum Ashley Judd. Since the debut of the first poster, the “Coolcats” have issued an annual poster featuring a celebrity with ties to the bluegrass. The program has achieved success including 3 national tournament appearances, 1992 national runner-up, and 18 winning seasons.

Recently, the Cool Cats simply became the Wildcats. The Wildcats have enjoyed a regional bid in the 06–07 season. In the 2007–08 season the cats finished in the national tournament failing to make it out of pool play. All home games are played at the Lexington Ice Center at midnight.

=== Rugby program ===
The University of Kentucky Rugby Club was founded in 1970. The club was organized by an engineering professor Dr. Roy Elmore and two of his students Larry Sonnifield and Rick Wunderlich. The team began competing in the fall of 1971 and quickly become a power in the newly formed SEC Conference. Kentucky won 3 conference titles in their initial Southeastern run in 1979, 1986, and 1987.

Despite this success, the program spent much of the 90s and 00s flipping between the Indiana Rugby Union and Ohio Rugby Union Division 3 competitions. In 2011, Kentucky joined the Southeastern Collegiate Rugby Conference. Since then, they have won an additional 3 conference championships in 15s in 2017, 2018, and 2023. In 2019 the Wildcats also won the SCRC Olympic (7s) championship.

In 2010 Gary Anderson became an assistant to then Head Coach Tony Vince and began to recruit high school players from Ohio and Indiana. This practice led to the rapid improvement of the program and in 2016 Anderson was named head coach. During his tenure, the club won 3 SCRC championships, 2 in 15s and 1 in 7s. Following their 2017 conference championship, the Wildcats advanced to the USA Rugby D1-AA National Semifinal, falling to eventual champions Mary Washington. In 2018, the Wildcats again won the SCRC and advanced to the national D1-AA tournament, again losing to the eventual national champions, Bowling Green, in the quarterfinal.

In 2022, Anderson stepped down as head coach and moved to an administrative role. To replace him, the club hired Samuel Enari to a 3-year contract. This was the first time the club had hired a fully professional head coach. Enari's tenure with UK has been massively successful. In 2022 the Wildcats were undefeated in conference play but did not advance to the conference final. The SCRC had joined the NCR D1-AA competition, but UK had stayed with USA Rugby, thus they were ineligible for postseason play within the conference. Instead, the Wildcats accepted a bid to play in the Mint City Bowl against Colorado State, which they won 32–15.

In 2023, the Wildcats joined NCR and went undefeated in conference play once again. Now able to compete for the conference title, the Wildcats downed Alabama in the SCRC semifinal 27–10. In the SCRC Championship, they faced Tennessee and won 32–12. Notably, 2023 featured a first ever SCRC B-Side championship, which Kentucky also won. In the NCR D1-AA Quarterfinal, Kentucky hosted Southern Conference champions North Carolina State and won 32–12. In the NCR D1-AA Semifinal held in Reading, Pennsylvania, Kentucky beat Boston College 51–12. One week later, Kentucky met in-state rivals Louisville in Houston at Sabercats Stadium and defeated the Cardinals decisively, 43–26, at one point leading 40–0 before a pair of yellow cards allowed Louisville to come back into the game.

The program currently plays college rugby in NCR Division 1-AA in the Southeastern Collegiate Rugby Conference. This conference is made up of several of the traditional SEC teams, and is divided into East and West.

The program has a fully professional head coach Samuel Enari, and six volunteer coaches, five of which are alumni. The program also offers a limited amount of scholarship funding to rugby players. The program funds itself with the support of an alumni base that puts together events throughout the year. This includes a charity golf tournament held in the fall in honor of alumnus Rob Shelton and is capped off each spring with an Alumni Game where the old boys play against the present UK squad.

== Mascots ==
The University of Kentucky has three official mascots:

- Blue — A live bobcat (note that in American English, "wildcat" generally refers to this particular mammal). He lives at the state-operated Salato Wildlife Education Center near Frankfort. Unlike the school's two costumed mascots, he never attends games, because bobcats are very shy by nature and do not react well with large crowds.
- The Wildcat — A costumed student, he made his debut in the 1976–77 school year. The Wildcat is the university's main mascot.
- Scratch — A later addition, he is a more child-friendly version of The Wildcat. Scratch wears his hat backwards and loves to have fun.

== All-time records by sport ==
Men's and Women's Basketball, Volleyball, Football, Men's Soccer, Men's Tennis, Women's Tennis, and Baseball all updated as of 6/26/17.

Sport	First season	Win	Loss	Tie	Win Pct.
Baseball	1896	1839	1776	26	.508
Basketball (men)	1903–04	2237	688		.765
Basketball (women)	1974–75	773	515		.586
Football	1881	652	647	44	.502
Soccer (men)	1991	275	197	67	.506
Soccer (women)	1992	167	114	25	.546
Softball	1997	518	604	1	.461
Tennis (men)	1916	1045	611	8	.628
Tennis (women)	1974	579	341		.629
Volleyball	1977	854	496	1	.628
Overall record		8604	5785	171	.589

== See also ==
- Bill Keightley
- Cawood Ledford
- C. M. Newton
- Pat Riley
- Keenan Burton
- Tim Couch
- Mark Higgs
- Art Still
- Jeff Van Note
- Moe Williams
- Jared Lorenzen
- Wesley Woodyard
- Craig Yeast
- Billy Gillispie
- Eddie Sutton
- Antoine Walker
- Mickie DeMoss
- Bernadette Locke-Mattox
- Brandon Webb
