= 2014 Kentucky Wildcats baseball team =

2014 season of University of Kentucky baseball team

2014 Kentucky Wildcats baseball
- Conference: Southeastern Conference
- Record: 37–25 (14–16 SEC)
- Head coach: Gary Henderson (6th season)
- Assistant coaches: Brian Green (6th season); Brad Bohannon (10th season); Keith Vorhoff (7th season)
- Home stadium: Cliff Hagan Stadium

2014 Southeastern Conference baseball standings
| | Conf. | | | | | | Overall |
| Team | W | | L | | T | PCT | W | | L | | T | PCT |
|---|---|---|---|---|---|---|---|---|---|---|---|---|
Eastern
| No. 24 Florida ^{x}‍†‍‍^{y} | 21 | – | 9 | – | 0 | .700 | 40 | – | 23 | – | 0 | .635 |
| No. 25 South Carolina ‍‍‍^{y} | 18 | – | 12 | – | 0 | .600 | 44 | – | 18 | – | 0 | .710 |
| No. 1 Vanderbilt ‍‍‍^{y} | 17 | – | 13 | – | 0 | .567 | 51 | – | 21 | – | 0 | .708 |
| Kentucky ‍‍‍^{y} | 14 | – | 16 | – | 0 | .467 | 37 | – | 25 | – | 0 | .597 |
| Tennessee ‍‍‍ | 12 | – | 18 | – | 0 | .400 | 31 | – | 23 | – | 0 | .574 |
| Georgia ‍‍‍ | 11 | – | 18 | – | 1 | .383 | 26 | – | 29 | – | 1 | .473 |
| Missouri ‍‍‍ | 6 | – | 24 | – | 0 | .200 | 20 | – | 33 | – | 0 | .377 |
Western
| No. 4 Ole Miss ^{x}‍‍‍^{y} | 19 | – | 11 | – | 0 | .633 | 48 | – | 21 | – | 0 | .696 |
| No. 21 LSU ‍‍‡‍^{y} | 17 | – | 11 | – | 1 | .603 | 46 | – | 16 | – | 1 | .738 |
| No. 28 Mississippi State ‍‍‍^{y} | 18 | – | 12 | – | 0 | .600 | 39 | – | 24 | – | 0 | .619 |
| No. 30 Arkansas ‍‍‍^{y} | 16 | – | 14 | – | 0 | .533 | 40 | – | 25 | – | 0 | .615 |
| Alabama ‍‍‍^{y} | 15 | – | 14 | – | 0 | .517 | 37 | – | 24 | – | 0 | .607 |
| Texas A&M ‍‍‍^{y} | 14 | – | 16 | – | 0 | .467 | 36 | – | 26 | – | 0 | .581 |
| Auburn ‍‍‍ | 10 | – | 20 | – | 0 | .333 | 28 | – | 28 | – | 0 | .500 |
x – Division champion † – Conference champion ‡ – Tournament champion y – Invited to the NCAA tournament Rankings from Collegiate Baseball

The 2014 Kentucky Wildcats baseball team represented the University of Kentucky in the 2014 NCAA Division I baseball season. The Wildcats played their home games in Cliff Hagan Stadium. The team was coached by Gary Henderson, who was in his sixth season at Kentucky.

Consensus All-American A. J. Reed (pitcher - first baseman) won numerous awards: Golden Spikes Award, Dick Howser Trophy, SEC Player of the Year, and John Olerud Award (two-way player).

== Roster ==
2014 Kentucky Wildcats baseball team
Players
Coaches

| # | Pos. | Name | B/T | Height | Weight | Year | Previous school | Home town |
|---|---|---|---|---|---|---|---|---|
| 2 | INF | Tyler Tipton | R/R | 6 ft 0 in (1.83 m) | 190 lb (86 kg) | Jr | Martha Layne Collins/Itawamba JC | Shelbyville, KY |
| 4 | OF | Kyle Barrett | L/L | 5 ft 11 in (1.8 m) | 180 lb (82 kg) | So | Chapel Hill | Douglasville, GA |
| 5 | INF | JaVon Shelby | R/R | 2 ft 2 in (0.66 m) | 188 lb (85 kg) | So | Tates Creek | Lexington, KY |
| 6 | INF | Matt Reida | L/R | 5 ft 11 in (1.8 m) | 178 lb (81 kg) | RS Sr | Western | Russiaville, IN |
| 7 | INF | Conner Heady | R/R | 6 ft 0 in (1.83 m) | 170 lb (77 kg) | Fr | North Oldham | Prospect, KY |
| 9 | INF | Max Kuhn | R/R | 5 ft 10 in (1.78 m) | 205 lb (93 kg) | Jr | Zionsville | Zionsville, IN |
| 11 | LHP | Matt Snyder | L/L | 6 ft 4 in (1.93 m) | 190 lb (86 kg) | RS So | Colonie Central/Virginia Tech/Fulton-Montgomery CC/Temple | Albany, NY |
| 14 | RHP | Chandler Shepherd | R/R | 6 ft 2 in (1.88 m) | 185 lb (84 kg) | Jr | Lawrence County | Louisa, KY |
| 15 | OF | Marcus Carson | L/L | 5 ft 8 in (1.73 m) | 165 lb (75 kg) | Fr | North Laurel | London, KY |
| 16 | C | Troy Squires | L/R | 5 ft 11 in (1.8 m) | 180 lb (82 kg) | Fr | Central Hardin | Elizabethtown, KY |
| 17 | RHP | Taylor Martin | R/R | 6 ft 5 in (1.96 m) | 205 lb (93 kg) | RS So | Lexington Catholic | Lexington, KY |
| 18 | LHP | A.J. Reed | L/L | 6 ft 4 in (1.93 m) | 240 lb (109 kg) | Jr | Terre Haute South | Terre Haute, IN |
| 19 | OF | Austin Cousino | L/L | 5 ft 10 in (1.78 m) | 185 lb (84 kg) | Jr | Dublin Coffman | Dublin, OH |
| 21 | RHP | Robert Ziegler | R/R | 6 ft 3 in (1.91 m) | 215 lb (98 kg) | Fr | Defiance | Defiance, OH |
| 23 | RHP | Kyle Cody | R/R | 6 ft 7 in (2.01 m) | 245 lb (111 kg) | So | McDonnell Central | Chippewa Falls, WI |
| 24 | LHP | Dylan Dwyer | L/L | 6 ft 1 in (1.85 m) | 175 lb (79 kg) | So | Calloway County | Murray, KY |
| 25 | LHP | Ryne Combs | L/L | 6 ft 0 in (1.83 m) | 190 lb (86 kg) | So | Bryan Station | Lexington, KY |
| 28 | LHP | Logan Salow | L/L | 6 ft 2 in (1.88 m) | 180 lb (82 kg) | Fr | Paul G. Blazer | Ashland, KY |
| 29 | RHP | Zach Strecker | R/R | 6 ft 4 in (1.93 m) | 220 lb (100 kg) | RS So | Eastern | Louisville, KY |
| 30 | LHP | Sam Mahar | R/R | 6 ft 1 in (1.85 m) | 175 lb (79 kg) | RS So | Tremper | Kenosha, WI |
| 33 | RHP | Zack Brown | R/R | 6 ft 2 in (1.88 m) | 190 lb (86 kg) | Fr | Seymour | Seymour, IN |
| 35 | C | Zach Arnold | R/R | 6 ft 2 in (1.88 m) | 180 lb (82 kg) | So | Franklin County | Frankfort, KY |
| 37 | RHP | Austin Perry | R/R | 6 ft 2 in (1.88 m) | 190 lb (86 kg) | Fr | Martha Layne Collins | Shelbyville, KY |
| 40 | C | Greg Fettes | R/R | 6 ft 2 in (1.88 m) | 225 lb (102 kg) | RS So | Lamphere | Madison Heights, MI |
| 42 | C | Michael Thomas | R/R | 5 ft 11 in (1.8 m) | 210 lb (95 kg) | RS Sr | Elizabethtown | Elizabethtown, KY |
| 44 | OF | Dorian Hairston | R/R | 5 ft 11 in (1.8 m) | 210 lb (95 kg) | So | Tates Creek | Lexington, KY |
| 46 | INF | Thomas Bernal | R/R | 6 ft 0 in (1.83 m) | 210 lb (95 kg) | RS Jr | Paso Robles | Paso Robles, CA |
| 47 | INF | Tyler Marshall | L/R | 6 ft 1 in (1.85 m) | 185 lb (84 kg) | Fr | Trinity | Louisville, KY |
| 49 | RHP | Logan Parrett | R/R | 6 ft 1 in (1.85 m) | 170 lb (77 kg) | Fr | Woodford County | Versailles, KY |

Head coach

Gary Henderson

Assistant coach(es)

Brad Bohannon
Brian Green
Keith Vorhoff

Legend

- (C) Team captain
- (S) Suspended
- (I) Ineligible
- Injured
- Current redshirt

Roster
Last update: January 16, 2014

== Schedule ==
2014 Kentucky Wildcats baseball game log: 37–25
Regular season: 32–22
February: 7–2

| # | Date | Opponent | Rank | Site/stadium | Score | Win | Loss | Save | Attendance | Overall record | SEC record |
|---|---|---|---|---|---|---|---|---|---|---|---|
| 1 | February 14 | No. 12 Virginia | | Brooks Field | W 8–3 | Reed (1–0) | Waddell (0–1) | none | | 1–0 | – |
| 2 | February 15 | @ UNC Wilmington | | Brooks Field | W 10–4 | Shepherd (1–0) | Ramsey (0–1) | none | 1,513 | 2–0 | – |
| 3 | February 16 | VMI | | Brooks Field | L 9–10 | Thomas (1–0) | Strecker (0–1) | none | | 2–1 | – |
| 4 | February 17 | @ USC Upstate | | Cleveland S. Harley Baseball Park | L 6–8 | Mitchell (1–0) | Zeigler (0–1) | Samples (1) | 117 | 2–2 | – |
| 5 | February 21 | St. Josephs | | Bud Metheny Baseball Complex | W 16–2 | Reed (2–0) | Carter (0–1) | none | | 3–2 | – |
| 6 | February 22 | @ Old Dominion | | Bud Metheny Baseball Complex | W 7–5 | Combs (1–0) | Ali (0–1) | none | 772 | 4–2 | – |
| 7 | February 23 | St. John's | | Bud Metheny Baseball Complex | W 13–0 | Cody (1–0) | McCormick (0–1) | none | | 5–2 | – |
| 8 | February 25 | Wright State | | Cliff Hagan Stadium | W 7–1 | Salow (1–0) | Braun (0–1) | none | 1,469 | 6–2 | – |
| 9 | February 26 | Dayton | | Cliff Hagan Stadium | Canceled | | | | | | |
| 10 | February 28 | Eastern Michigan | | Cliff Hagan Stadium | W 8–2 | Reed (3–0) | Andrews (1–1) | none | 1,461 | 7–2 | – |

March: 12–7

| # | Date | Opponent | Rank | Site/stadium | Score | Win | Loss | Save | Attendance | Overall record | SEC record |
|---|---|---|---|---|---|---|---|---|---|---|---|
| 11 | March 1 | Eastern Michigan | | Cliff Hagan Stadium | W 9–5 | Shepherd (2–0) | Russell (0–1) | none | | 8–2 | – |
| 12 | March 1 | Eastern Michigan | | Cliff Hagan Stadium | W 13–2 | Cody (2–0) | Land (0–1) | none | 1,668 | 9–2 | – |
| 13 | March 5 | Cincinnati | No. 23 | Cliff Hagan Stadium | W 7–0 | Dwyer (1–0) | Walsh (1–2) | none | | 10–2 | – |
| 14 | March 5 | Cincinnati | No. 23 | Cliff Hagan Stadium | W 11–4 | Jack (1–0) | Walker (0–2) | none | 1,460 | 11–2 | – |
| 15 | March 7 | Ball State | No. 23 | Cliff Hagan Stadium | L 8–10^{10} | Bautista (1–0) | Combs (1–1) | none | 1,911 | 11–3 | – |
| 16 | March 8 | Ball State | No. 23 | Cliff Hagan Stadium | W 24–1 | Shepherd (3–0) | Baker (1–2) | none | 2,091 | 12–3 | – |
| 17 | March 9 | Ball State | No. 23 | Cliff Hagan Stadium | W 26–3 | Nelson (1–0) | Manering (1–2) | none | 1,596 | 13–3 | – |
| 18 | March 11 | @ Indiana | No. 21 | Bart Kaufman Field | L 2–7 | Hart (2–1) | Dwyer (1–1) | none | 2,746 | 13–4 | – |
| 19 | March 12 | Northern Kentucky | No. 21 | Cliff Hagan Stadium | Canceled | | | | | | |
| 20 | March 14 | @ Alabama | No. 21 | Sewell-Thomas Stadium | L 0–3 | Turnbull (2–1) | Reed (3–1) | none | 4,258 | 13–5 | 0–1 |
| 21 | March 15 | @ Alabama | No. 21 | Sewell-Thomas Stadium | W 7–2 | Shepherd (4–0) | Kamplain (2–2) | none | | 14–5 | 1–1 |
| 22 | March 15 | @ Alabama | No. 21 | Sewell-Thomas Stadium | L 3–5^{10} | Burrows (3–0) | Salow (1–1) | none | 4,142 | 14–6 | 1–2 |
| 23 | March 18 | WKU | | Cliff Hagan Stadium | W 10–3 | Mahar (1–0) | Bartley (2–2) | none | 1,633 | 15–6 | 1–2 |
| 24 | March 21 | No. 1 South Carolina | | Cliff Hagan Stadium | W 13–5 | Reed (4–1) | Montgomery (3–2) | none | 1,937 | 16–6 | 2–2 |
| 25 | March 22 | No. 1 South Carolina | | Cliff Hagan Stadium | W 2–1 | Shepherd (5–0) | Wynkoop (4–1) | Salow (1) | 2,220 | 17–6 | 3–2 |
| 26 | March 23 | No. 1 South Carolina | | Cliff Hagan Stadium | L 3–8 | Crowe (5–0) | Nelson (1–1) | Seddon (7) | 1,870 | 17–7 | 3–3 |
| 27 | March 26 | Xavier | No. 17 | Cliff Hagan Stadium | W 9–6 | Cody (3–0) | Astle (1–2) | Jack (1) | 1,424 | 18–7 | 3–3 |
| 28 | March 28 | @ No. 5 Vanderbilt | No. 17 | Hawkins Field | W 4–2 | Reed (5–1) | Beede (4–3) | Cody (1) | 2,545 | 19–7 | 4–3 |
| 29 | March 29 | @ No. 5 Vanderbilt | No. 17 | Hawkins Field | L 3–9 | Miller (6–1) | Shepherd (5–1) | none | 2,885 | 19–8 | 4–4 |
| 30 | March 30 | @ No. 5 Vanderbilt | No. 17 | Hawkins Field | L 2–6 | Ferguson (5–0) | Nelson (1–2) | Fulmer (8) | 2,869 | 19–9 | 4–5 |

April: 8–8

| # | Date | Opponent | Rank | Site/stadium | Score | Win | Loss | Save | Attendance | Overall record | SEC record |
|---|---|---|---|---|---|---|---|---|---|---|---|
| 31 | April 1 | No. 8 Louisville | No. 21 | Cliff Hagan Stadium | W 8–3 | Dwyer (2–1) | Rogers (0–1) | Jack (2) | 3,742 | 20–9 | 4–5 |
| 32 | April 4 | No. 12 Florida | No. 21 | Cliff Hagan Stadium | W 17–1 | Reed (6–1) | Hanhold (3–3) | none | 2,133 | 21–9 | 5–5 |
| 33 | April 5 | No. 12 Florida | No. 21 | Cliff Hagan Stadium | L 10–11 | Shore (3–1) | Shepherd (5–2) | Puk (1) | 1,992 | 21–10 | 5–6 |
| 34 | April 6 | No. 12 Florida | No. 21 | Cliff Hagan Stadium | W 9–8 | Dwyer (3–1) | Poyner (3–3) | Cody (2) | 1,920 | 22–10 | 6–6 |
| 35 | April 8 | Morehead State | No. 18 | Cliff Hagan Stadium | L 4–6 | Schneider (2–2) | Combs (1–2) | none | 1,618 | 22–11 | 6–6 |
| 36 | April 11 | Missouri | No. 18 | Cliff Hagan Stadium | L 7–8 | Williams (2–1) | Jack (1–1) | Steele (8) | 1,950 | 22–12 | 6–7 |
| 37 | April 12 | Missouri | No. 18 | Cliff Hagan Stadium | W 12–0 | Dwyer (4–1) | Miles (2–4) | none | 2,458 | 23–12 | 7–7 |
| 38 | April 13 | Missouri | No. 18 | Cliff Hagan Stadium | L 3–8 | Anderson (2–2) | Nelson (1–3) | Steele (9) | 2,063 | 23–13 | 7–8 |
| 39 | April 15 | @Louisville | | Jim Patterson Stadium | W 4–2 | Salow (2–1) | Rogers (0–2) | Cody (S) | 2,597 | 24–13 | 7–8 |
| 40 | April 18 | @ Texas A&M | | Olsen Field at Blue Bell Park | W 6–3 | Reed (7–1) | Ray (4–3) | Cody (4) | 4,339 | 25–13 | 8–8 |
| 41 | April 19 | @ Texas A&M | | Olsen Field at Blue Bell Park | W 11–4 | Dwyer (5–1) | Mengden (2–6) | none | 5,311 | 26–13 | 9–8 |
| 42 | April 20 | @ Texas A&M | No. 21 | Olsen Field at Blue Bell Park | L 2–14 | Long (5–1) | Nelson (1–4) | none | 3,308 | 26–14 | 9–9 |
| 43 | April 22 | Tennessee Tech | No. 21 | Cliff Hagan Stadium | W 15–13 | Jack (2–1) | Tolle (3–1) | Cody (5) | 1,830 | 27–14 | 9–9 |
| 44 | April 25 | No. 12 Ole Miss | No. 21 | Cliff Hagan Stadium | W 12–4 | Ellis (6–0) | Reed (7–2) | none | 2,247 | 27–15 | 9–10 |
| 45 | April 26 | No. 12 Ole Miss | No. 21 | Cliff Hagan Stadium | L 5–18 | Trent (6–0) | Dwyer (5–2) | Weathersby (1) | 2,474 | 27–16 | 9–11 |
| 46 | April 27 | No. 12 Ole Miss | No. 21 | Cliff Hagan Stadium | L 6–9 | Massie (3–2) | Salow (2–2) | none | 2,380 | 27–17 | 9–12 |

May: 5–5

| # | Date | Opponent | Rank | Site/stadium | Score | Win | Loss | Save | Attendance | Overall record | SEC record |
|---|---|---|---|---|---|---|---|---|---|---|---|
| 47 | May 1 | @ Tennessee | | Lindsey Nelson Stadium | W 15–1 | Reed (8–2) | Martin (3–3) | none | 1,894 | 28–17 | 10–12 |
| 48 | May 2 | @ Tennessee | | Lindsey Nelson Stadium | L 2–8 | Williams (5–4) | Dwyer (5–3) | Serrano (1) | 2,089 | 28–18 | 10–13 |
| 49 | May 3 | @ Tennessee | | Lindsey Nelson Stadium | L 1–5 | Cox (4–1) | Nelson (1–5) | none | 1,991 | 28–19 | 10–14 |
| 50 | May 9 | Auburn | | Cliff Hagan Stadium | W 6–3 | Reed (9–2) | Dedrick (1–3) | Jack (3) | 2,239 | 28–19 | 11–14 |
| 51 | May 10 | Auburn | | Cliff Hagan Stadium | L 1–8 | Ortman (9–3) | Shepherd (5–3) | none | 2,492 | 29–20 | 11–15 |
| 52 | May 11 | Auburn | | Cliff Hagan Stadium | W 6–5^{10} | Jack (3–1) | Tella (0–1) | none | 2,279 | 30–20 | 12–15 |
| 53 | May 13 | Murray State | | Brooks Stadium | L 3–4^{12} | Lollar (1–1) | Salow (2–3) | none | 502 | 30–21 | 12–15 |
| 54 | May 15 | @ Georgia | | Foley Field | W 13–0 | Reed (10–2) | Lawlor (4–6) | none | 2,003 | 31–21 | 13–15 |
| 55 | May 16 | @ Georgia | | Foley Field | W 10–0 | Nelson (2–5) | Sosebee (1–4) | none | 1,933 | 32–21 | 14–15 |
| 56 | May 17 | @ Georgia | | Foley Field | L 10–11 | Tyler (6–4) | Brown (0–1) | Cheek (3) | 2,507 | 32–22 | 14–16 |

Postseason: 5–3
SEC Tournament: 3–1

| # | Date | Opponent | Seed/Rank | Site/stadium | Score | Win | Loss | Save | Attendance | Overall record | SECT record |
|---|---|---|---|---|---|---|---|---|---|---|---|
| 57 | May 20 | vs. (8) Alabama | (9) | Hoover Met | W 7–1 | Reed (11–2) | Eicholtz (3–2) | Nelson (1) | | 33–22 | 1–0 |
| 58 | May 21 | vs. (1) No. 11 Florida | (9) | Hoover Met | W 4–2 | Cody (4–0) | Shore (7–3) | Shepherd (1) | | 34–22 | 2–0 |
| 59 | May 22 | vs. (5) No. 17 Mississippi State | (9) | Hoover Met | W 7–6^{12} | Jack (4–1) | Brown (4–3) | none | 8,501 | 35–22 | 3–0 |
| 60 | May 24 | vs. (1) No. 11 Florida | (9) | Hoover Met | L 5–6 | Hanhold (4–3) | Shepherd (5–4) | none | 8,116 | 35–23 | 3–1 |

NCAA tournament: Louisville Regional: 2–2

| # | Date | Opponent | Seed/Rank | Site/stadium | Score | Win | Loss | Save | Attendance | Overall record | NCAAT record |
|---|---|---|---|---|---|---|---|---|---|---|---|
| 61 | May 30 | vs. (3) Kansas | (2) No. 26 | Jim Patterson Stadium | L 6–10 | Drew (10–4) | Shepherd (5–5) | none | 2,365 | 35–24 | 0–1 |
| 62 | May 31 | vs. (4) Kent State | (2) No. 26 | Jim Patterson Stadium | W 4–2 | Reed (12–2) | Fasola (2–2) | none | 2,258 | 36–24 | 1–1 |
| 63 | June 1 | vs. (3) Kansas | (2) No. 26 | Jim Patterson Stadium | W 8–6 | Brown (1–1) | Kahana (4–7) | Jack (4) | 2,275 | 37–24 | 2–1 |
| 64 | June 1 | @ (1) No. 12 Louisville | (2) No. 26 | Jim Patterson Stadium | L 1–4 | Rogers (3–3) | Salow (2–4) | Burdi (16) | 4,319 | 37–25 | 2–2 |

2014 Kentucky Wildcats Baseball Schedule

== Record vs. conference opponents ==
Last two do not qualify for conf. tourn. Blank are not scheduled. Blue are home games, otherwise away.

2014 SEC baseball records Source: 2014 SEC baseball game results
| Team | W–L | ALA | ARK | AUB | FLA | UGA | KEN | LSU | MSU | MIZZ | MISS | SCAR | TENN | TAMU | VAN | Team | Div | SR | SW |
|---|---|---|---|---|---|---|---|---|---|---|---|---|---|---|---|---|---|---|---|
| ALA | 15–14 | | 1–2 | 2–1 | 0–3 | . | 2–1 | 1–1 | 1–2 | . | 3–0 | 1–2 | 2–1 | 2–1 | . | ALA | W5 | 5–4 | 1–1 |
| ARK | 16–14 | 2–1 | | 1–2 | 1–2 | . | . | 1–2 | 1–2 | 3–0 | 1–2 | 2–1 | . | 2–1 | 2–1 | ARK | W4 | 5–5 | 1–0 |
| AUB | 10–20 | 1–2 | 2–1 | | . | . | 1–2 | 0–3 | 0–3 | 1–2 | 0–3 | 1–2 | 2–1 | 2–1 | . | AUB | W7 | 3–7 | 0–3 |
| FLA | 21–9 | 3–0 | 2–1 | . | | 3–0 | 1–2 | 3–0 | . | 3–0 | . | 2–1 | 2–1 | 1–2 | 1–2 | FLA | E1 | 7–3 | 4–0 |
| UGA | 11–18 | . | . | . | 0–3 | | 1–2 | 0–2 | 1–2 | 2–1 | 1–2 | 2–1 | 2–1 | 2–1 | 0–3 | UGA | E6 | 4–6 | 0–2 |
| KEN | 14–16 | 1–2 | . | 2–1 | 2–1 | 2–1 | | . | . | 1–2 | 0–3 | 2–1 | 1–2 | 2–1 | 1–2 | KEN | E4 | 5–5 | 0–1 |
| LSU | 17–11 | 1–1 | 2–1 | 3–0 | 0–3 | 2–0 | . | | 3–0 | . | 2–1 | . | 2–1 | 1–2 | 1–2 | LSU | W2 | 6–3 | 2–1 |
| MSU | 18–12 | 2–1 | 2–1 | 3–0 | . | 2–1 | . | 0–3 | | 3–0 | 1–2 | . | 2–1 | 1–2 | 2–1 | MSU | W3 | 7–3 | 2–1 |
| MIZZ | 6–24 | . | 0–3 | 2–1 | 0–3 | 1–2 | 2–1 | . | 0–3 | | 0–3 | 0–3 | 1–2 | . | 0–3 | MIZZ | E7 | 2–8 | 0–6 |
| MISS | 19–11 | 0–3 | 2–1 | 3–0 | . | 2–1 | 3–0 | 1–2 | 2–1 | 3–0 | | 1–2 | . | 2–1 | . | MISS | W1 | 7–3 | 3–1 |
| SCAR | 18–12 | 2–1 | 1–2 | 2–1 | 1–2 | 1–2 | 1–2 | . | . | 3–0 | 2–1 | | 3–0 | . | 2–1 | SCAR | E2 | 6–4 | 2–0 |
| TENN | 12–18 | 1–2 | . | 1–2 | 1–2 | 1–2 | 2–1 | 1–2 | 1–2 | 2–1 | . | 0–3 | | . | 2–1 | TENN | E5 | 3–7 | 0–1 |
| TAMU | 14–16 | 1–2 | 1–2 | 1–2 | 2–1 | 1–2 | 1–2 | 2–1 | 2–1 | . | 1–2 | . | . | | 2–1 | TAMU | W6 | 4–6 | 0–0 |
| VAN | 17–13 | . | 1–2 | . | 2–1 | 3–0 | 2–1 | 2–1 | 1–2 | 3–0 | . | 1–2 | 1–2 | 1–2 | | VAN | E3 | 5–5 | 2–0 |
| Team | W–L | ALA | ARK | AUB | FLA | UGA | KEN | LSU | MSU | MIZZ | MISS | SCAR | TENN | TAMU | VAN | Team | Div | SR | SW |

Updated for entire regular season. Georgia at LSU had a tie game.

== See also ==
- Kentucky Wildcats baseball
