= Great America Rifle Conference =

NCAA rifle-only conference

- Association: NCAA
- Founded: 1998
- Commissioner: Harry Mullins
- Sports fielded: Rifle
- Division: I
- No. of teams: 6

The Great America Rifle Conference (GARC) is a National Collegiate Athletic Association (NCAA) rifle-only conference. The GARC was established for schools that sponsor rifle teams, but do not have rifle sponsored in their respective conferences.

== Members ==
=== Current members ===
Institution	Location	Founded	Enrollment	Nickname	Home conference
Army	West Point, NY	1802	4,294	Black Knights	Patriot League
Akron	Akron, OH	1870	14,813 (2024)	Zips	Mid-American Conference
Kentucky	Lexington, KY	1865	35,952 (2024)	Wildcats	SEC
Memphis	Memphis, TN	1912	20,276	Tigers	American Athletic Conference
Navy	Annapolis, MD	1845	4,576	Midshipmen	Patriot League
West Virginia	Morgantown, WV	1867	25,998 (2024)	Mountaineers	Big 12

=== Former members ===
- Jacksonville State Gamecocks (Left in 2003 when it joined the rifle-sponsoring Ohio Valley Conference)
- NC State Wolfpack – Dropped rifle after the 2022–23 season.
- Nebraska (Left in 2021, joined the Patriot Rifle Conference)
- Xavier Musketeers (Left in 2005, Dropped the sport)
- Ole Miss (Left in 2024, joined the Patriot Rifle Conference)

=== Founding members ===
- Jacksonville State Gamecocks
- Kentucky Wildcats
- West Virginia Mountaineers
- Xavier Musketeers

== Champions ==
=== GARC championships ===
Year	Regular season	Tournament
1998	West Virginia	West Virginia
1999	West Virginia	West Virginia
2000	West Virginia	West Virginia
2001	West Virginia	Kentucky
2002	Xavier	Kentucky
2003	West Virginia	Jacksonville State
2004	Army, Kentucky, Xavier (tie)	Kentucky
2005	Army	Nebraska
2006	Nebraska	Nebraska
2007	Kentucky	Kentucky
2008	Memphis	Army
2009	Kentucky	Kentucky
2010	West Virginia	West Virginia
2011	Kentucky	West Virginia
2012	Kentucky	West Virginia
2013	Kentucky	West Virginia
2014	West Virginia	West Virginia
2015	West Virginia	West Virginia
2016	West Virginia	West Virginia
2017	West Virginia	West Virginia
2018	West Virginia	West Virginia
2019	West Virginia	West Virginia

=== NCAA Championships ===
- Army – 2005
- Kentucky – 2011, 2018, 2021, 2022
- West Virginia (20) – 1983, 1984, 1986, 1988–93, 1995–98, 2009, 2013–17, 2025

== See also ==
- List of NCAA rifle programs
- NCAA Rifle Championship
