= Harry Lancaster =

American basketball and baseball coach

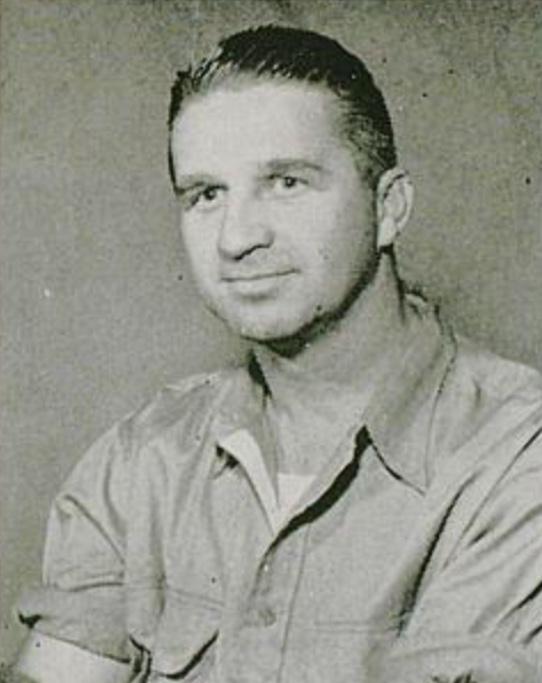
- Lancaster from the 1948 Kentuckian

Biographical details
- Born: February 14, 1911; Paris, Kentucky, U.S.
- Died: February 5, 1985 (aged 73); Lexington, Kentucky, U.S.
- Education: Georgetown College

Coaching career (HC unless noted)

Basketball
- 1943–1944: Kentucky (assistant)
- 1946–1969: Kentucky (assistant)
- 1981: Kentucky (assistant)

Baseball
- 1947: Kentucky
- 1951–1965: Kentucky

Administrative career (AD unless noted)
- 1969–1975: Kentucky

Head coaching record
- Overall: 163–164–2

Harry Lancaster (February 14, 1911 – February 5, 1985) was an American college sports coach and administrator. He was an assistant men's basketball coach at Kentucky for more than 20 seasons under Adolph Rupp. He was also Kentucky's head baseball coach in 1947 and from 1951 to 1965. Lancaster attended Georgetown College in Kentucky, where he played basketball and baseball.

In addition to coaching, Lancaster worked as an instructor and administrator. He was a physical education professor at Kentucky from 1941 to 1975 and Kentucky's athletic director from 1969 to 1975.

Lancaster died on February 5, 1985, at age 73. He had liver cancer and diabetes.

== Coaching career ==
=== Basketball ===
Lancaster was an assistant to Adolph Rupp for 22 years, hired to replace Paul McBrayer when McBrayer took the head coaching job at Eastern Kentucky. He was at Rupp's side for UK's first four NCAA Championships (1948, 1949, 1951, 1958) and "Rupp's Runts" of 1966, that finished NCAA Runner-Up.

=== Baseball ===
Lancaster served as Kentucky's head baseball coach for 16 seasons over two stints (1947, 1951–1965). He had an overall record of 163–164–1. Through 1958, the Wildcats had only one winning season under Lancaster, when they went 8–7 in 1952. From 1959 to 1965, however, the team did not finish below .500 and won more than 15 games four times. It finished as high as second in the SEC East, in 1961.

From 1962 to 1964, future Major League Baseball player Cotton Nash played at Kentucky under Lancaster. Lancaster's final season, 1965, was the first year of the Major League Baseball draft. The Houston Astros selected Kentucky's James Monin in the 3rd round.

== Legacy ==
The Lancaster Aquatic Center at the University of Kentucky, the home of the Wildcat's swimming and diving teams, is named for Lancaster.

== Head coaching record ==
Below is a table of Lancaster's yearly records as a collegiate head baseball coach.

Record table
Season	Team	Overall	Conference	Standing	Postseason
Kentucky Wildcats (Southeastern Conference) (1947)
1947	Kentucky	7–9	4–4	T–6th	
Kentucky Wildcats (Southeastern Conference) (1951–1965)
1951	Kentucky	8–10–1	5–9–1	10th	
1952	Kentucky	8–7	6–6	6th	
1953	Kentucky	7–11	5–9	10th	
1954	Kentucky	9–10	4–10	T–11th	
1955	Kentucky	2–13	0–12	12th	
1956	Kentucky	4–18	1–12	12th	
1957	Kentucky	6–18	2–14	12th	
1958	Kentucky	8–9	5–4	7th	
1959	Kentucky	18–8	9–5	4th (East)	
1960	Kentucky	18–8	9–7	T–3rd (East)	
1961	Kentucky	17–8	10–6	2nd (East)	
1962	Kentucky	12–7–1	9–7	T–3rd (East)	
1963	Kentucky	11–11	8–10	T–4th (East)	
1964	Kentucky	16–7	10–5	3rd (East)	
1965	Kentucky	12–10	7–7	4th (East)	
Kentucky:		163–164–2	94–127–1		
Total:		163–164–2			
