= Terry Shumpert =

American baseball player (born 1966)

- Second baseman
- Born: August 16, 1966 (age 59); Paducah, Kentucky, U.S.
- Batted: Right Threw: Right

MLB debut
- May 1, 1990, for the Kansas City Royals

Last MLB appearance
- September 28, 2003, for the Tampa Bay Devil Rays

MLB statistics
- Batting average: .252
- Home runs: 49
- Runs batted in: 223
- Stats at Baseball Reference

Teams
- Kansas City Royals (1990–1994); Boston Red Sox (1995); Chicago Cubs (1996); San Diego Padres (1997); Colorado Rockies (1998–2002); Los Angeles Dodgers (2003); Tampa Bay Devil Rays (2003)

Terrance Darnell Shumpert (born August 16, 1966) is an American former professional baseball utility player. He played in Major League Baseball (MLB) for the Kansas City Royals, Boston Red Sox, Chicago Cubs, San Diego Padres, Colorado Rockies, Los Angeles Dodgers, and Tampa Bay Devil Rays. He played college baseball at Kentucky.

== Collegiate career ==
As a three-year starter in the middle infield for coach Keith Madison's Kentucky Wildcats baseball program, Shumpert earned All-America honors at second base in 1987. He was named first-team All-SEC in 1986 and 1987 and was a member of the SEC All-Tournament Team in 1987.

As a sophomore in 1986, Shumpert hit .364 with 19 doubles, two triples, 10 homers and 37 RBI, stealing 28 bases. Shumpert had a dynamic junior season in 1987, hitting .376 with 19 doubles, four triples, nine homers and 32 stolen bases. His .374 average in 1987 ranks as the 11th-best mark in program history and he finished ranking sixth and eighth in the UK single-season stolen base record book.

== Professional career ==
A second-round pick in the 1987 MLB Draft by the Kansas City Royals, Shumpert would make his Major League Baseball debut with the Kansas City Royals on May 1, 1990. He last appeared in a Major League game during the 2003 season. Shumpert hit .252 during his MLB career in 854 games, with 49 homers, 223 RBI and 85 steals.

== Personal life ==
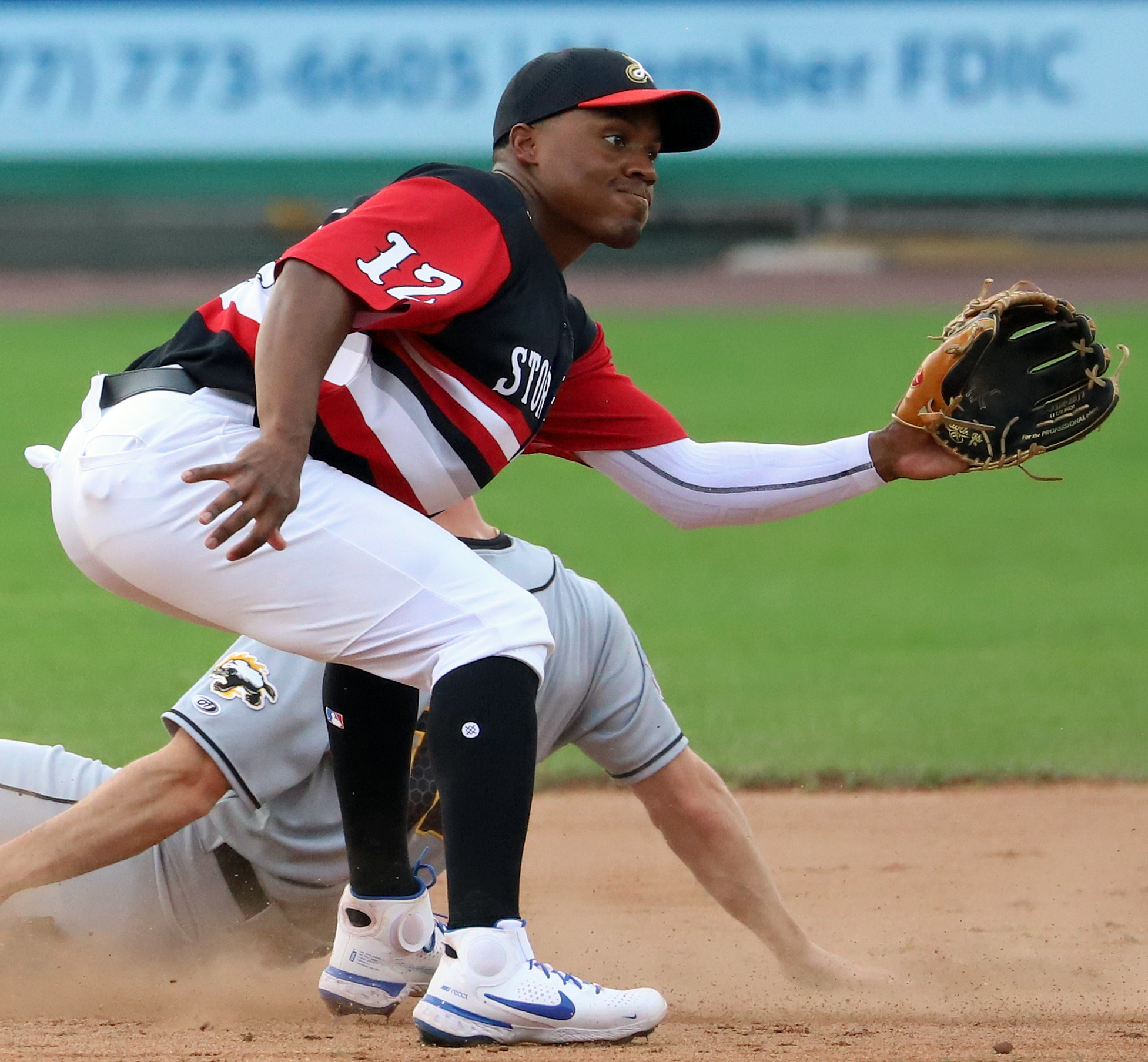
Nick Shumpert with the Lancaster Barnstormers in 2021

Shumpert's son, Nick, a shortstop, was drafted by the Detroit Tigers in the seventh round of the 2015 MLB draft. Nick chose to head to junior college and was drafted and signed by the Atlanta Braves in the 2016 MLB draft. He currently plays for the Lincoln Saltdogs of the American Association of Professional Baseball.

Although it has been reported that Mookie Betts is a nephew of Shumpert, they are actually first cousins once removed, as Shumpert is a first cousin to Betts' mother, Diana. In 2004, Shumpert worked extensively with Betts while playing in Tennessee for the Nashville Sounds.
