= Kentucky Proud Park =

Baseball park at the University of Kentucky

Coordinates: 38.018610°N 84.503595°W

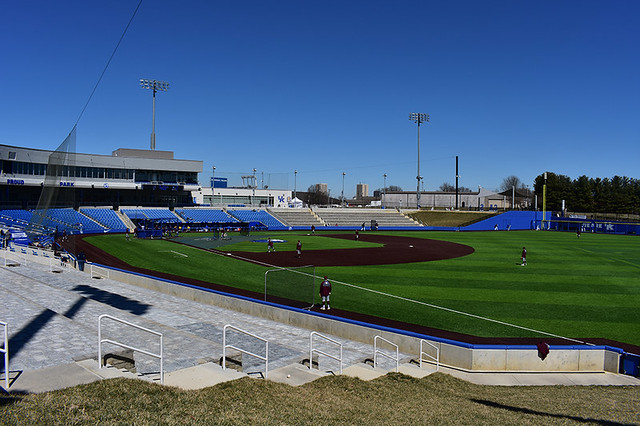

- Location in Kentucky Location in the United States
- Interactive map of Kentucky Proud Park
- Address: 510 Wildcat Court
- Location: Lexington, Kentucky 40506
- Owner: University of Kentucky
- Operator: University of Kentucky
- Capacity: 5,000
- Type: Stadium
- Event: Baseball
- Surface: Artificial turf; AstroTurf Rootzone Diamond Blend
- Record attendance: 7,558 (vs. Oregon State; June 10, 2024)
- Field size: LF: 335 ft (102.1 m); LC: 375 ft (114.3 m); CF: 400 ft (121.9 m); RC: 365 ft (111.3 m); RF: 320 ft (97.5 m)

Construction
- Groundbreaking: March 2, 2017
- Built: 2018
- Opened: February 26, 2019
- Cost: $49 million
- Architects: HNTB; RossTarrant Architects; BallparkDesignAssociates, LLC

Tenant
- Kentucky Wildcats (NCAA) (2019–present)

Website
- https://ukathletics.com/facilities/kentucky-proud-park/62

Kentucky Proud Park is a baseball stadium in Lexington, Kentucky. It is the home field of the University of Kentucky Wildcats college baseball team. The stadium opened in 2018, with the Wildcats playing their first season there in 2019. It has 2,500 fixed seats, with grass berm seating adding an additional 1,500-plus to the total capacity. Temporary seating can also be added to bring the capacity to 7,000 for NCAA tournament games.

The replacement for Cliff Hagan Stadium, the park received its name in a deal between JMI Sports, which holds the multimedia rights for UK sports and also markets the naming rights to all Wildcats venues, and the Kentucky Farm Bureau, an organization promoting the interests of Kentucky farmers which is best known by the non-farming public for its insurance business. The Farm Bureau chose to donate its naming rights to the Kentucky Department of Agriculture, which uses "Kentucky Proud" as the brand for its marketing program for agricultural products made in the state.

Kentucky opened up Kentucky Proud Park on February 26, 2019, with a 7–3 win over Eastern Kentucky in front of 4,074 fans.

== Kentucky Proud Park in detail ==
The Kentucky Proud Park features a large entrance right being home plate and a left field entrance directly connected to the parking lot. There is also an interactive screen at the entrance that allows fans to touch to see the history of the team, the information about the stadium, the players who played in the major leagues, and design their own uniform with the Kentucky colors. The large concourse wraps around the entire field and is spacious with dealerships, bathrooms and other signs. Club and lounge areas are also available to fans. A small grass area in left field is accessible for kids to get entertained during the game. The Kentucky Proud Park include a big video board. Measured at 48 feet wide and 30 feet tall, the video board is the eight largest video board in all College Baseball.

== First reaction ==
A couple days before the 2019 opening season, Nick Mingione, head coach of the Kentucky Wildcats Baseball team, was interviewed concerning the new Kentucky Proud Park. “It really is just a special place,” was his original reaction. “I’m excited for the Big Blue Nation to experience it. I think they’re really going to fall in love with it,” Head Coach Mingione said. “The team has really fit in here,” “They’re comfortable here. T.J. Collett already hit the first Big Blue Bomb here. We won the first one... this is our true home. We’re excited to stay and finish the season strong here,” Mingione said on February 26, 2019, after a 7–3 win.

== 2016–2017 season ==
The last time the Wildcats made a postseason run was in 2016. They ended up hosting a regional tournament in Lexington. The Cliff Hagan Stadium saw its first postseason action since 2006. Nick Mingione led his troops to this postseason run in his first year. After beating Ohio University, Indiana University and North Carolina State University twice in Lexington during the regionals, the Wildcats moved on to the Super Regionals. They faced the Louisville Cardinals. The Wildcats saw their season end after two consecutive lost to Louisville who advanced to the College World Series.

== Kentucky Wildcats' record in Kentucky Proud Park (since 2019) ==
=== Year ===	=== Games ===	=== Overall W-L ===	=== Overall Win Pct ===	=== SEC W-L ===	=== SEC Win Pct ===
2019	31	16–15	.516	2–13	.133
2020	14	11–3	.786	NA	NA
2021	35	22–13	.629	6–9	.400
2022	34	22–12	.647	7–8	.563
2023	36	29–7	.806	11–4	.733
2024	32	25–7	.781	10–5	.667
2025	29	19–10	.655	8–7	.533

Locker Room	Entertainment and Nutrition area	Cages

== See also ==
- List of NCAA Division I baseball venues
- Climate Pledge Arena, an indoor arena in Seattle that received its current name via a similar donation of naming rights
- Nationalarenan, a stadium in Stockholm that received one of its former sponsored names via a similar donation of naming rights
