= Kentucky Wildcats baseball =

Baseball team of the University of Kentucky

Kentucky Wildcats
- 2026 Kentucky Wildcats baseball team
- Founded: 1896 (129 years ago)
- University: University of Kentucky
- Athletic director: J Batt
- Head coach: Nick Mingione (10th season)
- Conference: SEC
- Location: Lexington, Kentucky
- Home stadium: Kentucky Proud Park (from 2019) (capacity: 7250)
- Nickname: Wildcats
- Colors: Blue and white

College World Series appearances
- 2024

NCAA regional champions
- 2017, 2023, 2024

NCAA tournament appearances
- 1949, 1950, 1988, 1993, 2006, 2008, 2012, 2014, 2017, 2023, 2024, 2025, 2026

Conference regular season champions
- 2006, 2024

The Kentucky Wildcats baseball team represents the University of Kentucky in NCAA Division I college baseball and competes in the Southeastern Conference (SEC). The current head coach of the Wildcats is Nick Mingione.

== History ==
The baseball program, partly hampered by being the northernmost school in the heavily warm-weather SEC (until Missouri's arrival in 2013), has historically achieved only modest success at best. Under longtime coach Keith Madison (1979–2003), the Wildcats had some good teams. However, due to playing in the same league as national powers Florida, LSU (which won five national championships under Skip Bertman from 1991 through 2000), Mississippi State, and South Carolina, regular-season success was rarely rewarded with a postseason berth. In 28 years, Madison was only able to lead the Wildcats to two NCAA tournaments, in 1988 and 1993. The Wildcats won their first three regional games in 1988 to move to within one win of the CWS, but lost twice in the championship round to 1987 national champion Stanford, which went on to successfully defend its title.

Wildcats baseball hit bottom at the turn of the 21st century, with only one winning season from 1997 through 2004, and five straight last-place finishes in the SEC East from 2001 through 2005. In 2003, after Madison's retirement, Kentucky hired Florida assistant John Cohen as head coach. Cohen was able to lead the Cats to a winning overall season in 2005, despite another SEC cellar finish.

The Cats are noted to have had a Cinderella season in 2006. The team went from worst to first in the SEC, winning a regular-season conference title for the first time in three decades, and being ranked as high as fourth in the country by one major baseball poll during the season. However, the newly energized Kentucky baseball faithful saw the Cats crash out of the SEC tournament early and fail to make it out of the regionals of the NCAA tournament at home.

There were high hopes for the 2007 team and for the most part they delivered. They started the season 19–0 before falling to Arkansas. They then fell into a tailspin but rebounded at the end of the year to just miss the SEC playoffs after a Tennessee Volunteers win. They finished with a 37–19 record. Jason Kipnis, who was an outfielder for that team, is now a second baseman for the Cleveland Indians.

In 2008, Kentucky started off strong posting a 19–0 record and being ranked as high as #4 in the nation. The Wildcats rolled into conference play and began to struggle after being swept by eventual College World Series runner-up Georgia and College World Series participant LSU. The Wildcats finished the season strong and made it into the NCAA tournament. The Wildcats would end up losing to Arizona in the regional final in Ann Arbor, Michigan. The Wildcats finished the season with a 44–19 record, the most wins in school history. They finished 25th in the final ESPN/USA Today poll.

The Wildcats slumped back to the SEC's second division in 2009, though they finished two games over .500 overall. Cohen left for Mississippi State after the season, and pitching coach Gary Henderson was named his successor.

In 2012, Kentucky garnered its most successful season in program history up until that time. Henderson was voted SEC Coach of the Year by the league coaches. Henderson directed the Wildcats to a school-record 45-win season, with UK completing its best finishes in the SEC and NCAA tournaments in school annals. The 2012 season also marked the first time that UK had ever been ranked No. 1. UK finished the season with a No. 11 ranking by Baseball America. UK also achieved a program record by winning seven of ten series in SEC play. UK also ran up a school-record 22-game winning streak, which is the second longest in SEC history.

At the end of the 2016 season, Henderson resigned, and the university replaced him with Nick Mingione, who had previously been an assistant coach at UK and Mississippi State under Cohen. In his first season, he led the Wildcats to a home regional championship. He repeated this in 2023 before losing to eventual national champion LSU in the super regional.

In 2024, Kentucky had a school-best ever year, starting the season at 32–5 and 15–1 in the SEC. They finished the regular season 39–12 and 22–8 in the SEC. The Wildcats hosted the regional and super regional where they went undefeated. They were one of eight teams that went to the 2024 College World Series, where they lost out in the double elimination round with CWS record of 1–2.

== Stadium ==
The Wildcats played their home games on campus at Cliff Hagan Stadium from 1969 through 2018. On October 21, 2016, Kentucky announced plans to build a new stadium, with fixed seating for 2,400, additional grass berm seating for a permanent capacity of 4,000, and the capability to add temporary seating to raise capacity to as much as 7,000. The new stadium, Kentucky Proud Park, opened on February 26, 2019, with a 7–3 win over Eastern Kentucky in front of 4,074 fans.

== Head coaches ==
- G.L. Byroade (1903)
- A.A. Gordon (1904)
- W.C. Kelly (1905)
- H.E. Reed (1906)
- F.C. Paullin (1907)
- C.M. Leaphart (1908)
- Frank Engel (1911–1913)
- Alpha Brummage (1914–1915)
- Bill Tuttle (1916)
- J.B. Fledge (1917)
- Andrew Gill (1920–1921)
- Jim Park (1922)
- C.E. Barger (1923–1924)
- Fred J. Murphy (1925–1926)
- John Devereauux (1927, 1929–1931)
- Fred Major (1928)
- Frank Moseley (1939–1941, 1946, 1948–1950)
- Bill Black (1942)
- Harry Lancaster (1947, 1951–1965)
- Abe Shannon (1966–1969)
- Dick Parsons (1970–1972)
- Jordan "Tuffy" Horne (1973–1978)
- Keith Madison (1979–2003)
- John Cohen (2004–2008)
- Gary Henderson (2009–2016)
- Nick Mingione (2017–present)

== Former players ==
- Jeff Abbott
- Joe Blanton
- Collin Cowgill
- Scott Downs
- Doug Flynn
- Marv Foley
- Andy Green
- Rod Henderson
- Sean Hjelle
- Paul Kilgus
- Jason Kipnis
- Jim Leyritz
- Larry Luebbers
- Luke Maile
- Alex Meyer
- Cotton Nash
- Jeff Parrett
- James Paxton
- Tristan Pompey
- Frank Ramsey
- AJ Reed
- Chris Rusin
- Jack Savage
- Terry Shumpert
- Ryan Strieby
- Mark Thompson
- William Van Landingham
- Brandon Webb
- Evan White
- JT Riddle

== Player awards ==
=== National awards ===
Dick Howser Trophy

Dick Howser Trophy
| Player | Position | year |
| A.J. Reed | Utility Player | 2014 |

Golden Spikes Award

Golden Spikes Award winners
| Player | Position | year |
| A.J. Reed | Utility Player | 2014 |

- Baseball America College Player of the Year Award

A. J. Reed (2014)

- Collegiate Baseball Newspaper College Player of the Year Award

A. J. Reed (2014)

- John Olerud Award

A. J. Reed (2014)

=== SEC Awards ===
- Player of the Year Award

Ryan Strieby (2006)
A. J. Reed (2014)

== All-Americans ==
The following is a list of Kentucky's All-Americans:

| Year | Player | Position |
|---|---|---|
| 1949 | Dom Fucci | C |
| 1961 | Dickie Parsons | SS |
| 1976 | Jimmy Sherrill | OF |
| 1981 | Jeff Keener | P |
| 1987 | Terry Shumpert | 2B |
| 1988 | Chris Estep | OF |
| 1991 | Rick Norton | 3B |
| 1991 | Mike Harris | 1B |
| 1993 | Brad Hindersman | DH |
| 1994 | Jeff Abbott | OF |
| 1996 | Chad Green | OF |
| 1996 | Sam White | 2B |
| 1999 | John Wilson | C |
| 2006 | Ryan Strieby | 1B |
| 2007 | Sean Coughlin | C |
| 2008 | Sawyer Carroll | OF |
| 2008 | Collin Cowgill | OF |
| 2014 | A. J. Reed | 1B |
| 2019 | Jake Sanford | OF |
Kentucky Wildcats All-Americans

== NCAA tournament record ==
Year-by-Year Results
| Year | Record | Pct. | Notes |
|---|---|---|---|
| 1988 | 3-2 | .600 | Northeast Regional |
| 1993 | 0-2 | .000 | Central II Regional |
| 2006 | 2-2 | .500 | Lexington Regional |
| 2008 | 2-2 | .500 | Ann Arbor Regional |
| 2012 | 2-2 | .500 | Gary Regional |
| 2014 | 2-2 | .500 | Louisville Regional |
| 2017 | 3-3 | .500 | Louisville Super Regional |
| 2023 | 4–3 | .571 | Baton Rouge Super Regional |
| 2024 | 6–2 | .750 | College World Series |
| 2025 | 2–2 | .500 | Clemson Regional |
| 2026 | 2–2 | .000 | Morgantown Regional |

== Wildcats in MLB ==
Several Wildcats players have gone on to play in Major League Baseball.

| Position | Name | Bats | Throws | Hometown | Draft year | Round | MLB team |
|---|---|---|---|---|---|---|---|
| OF | Collin Cowgill | R | L | Lexington, KY | 2008 | 5th | Los Angeles Angels |
| RP | Scott Downs | L | L | Louisville, KY | 1997 | 3rd | Chicago White Sox |
| SP | James Paxton | L | L | Richmond, BC | 2010 | 4th | Seattle Mariners |
| RP | Chris Rusin | L | L | Detroit, MI | 2009 | 4th | Colorado Rockies |
| RP | Trevor Gott | R | R | Lexington, KY | 2013 | 4th | Washington Nationals |
| SP | Alex Meyer | R | R | Greensburg, IN | 2011 | 1st | Minnesota Twins |
| RP | Taylor Rogers | L | L | Littleton, CO | 2012 | 11th | Minnesota Twins |
| 1B | A. J. Reed | L | L | Terre Haute, IN | 2014 | 2nd | Houston Astros |

== See also ==
- List of NCAA Division I baseball programs
