= Dick Parsons (coach) =

American basketball and baseball coach

Biographical details
- Born: May 31, 1938 (age 88); Yancey, Kentucky, U.S.

Playing career
- 1957–1961: Kentucky (basketball, baseball)
- Positions: guard (basketball) shortstop (baseball)

Coaching career (HC unless noted)

Basketball
- 1970–1980: Kentucky (assistant)

Baseball
- 1970–1972: Kentucky

Administrative career (AD unless noted)
- ?: Kentucky

Head coaching record
- Overall: 163-164-2

James R. "Dick" Parsons is a former American college baseball and college basketball coach. He was the coach of the Kentucky Wildcats baseball team from 1970 to 1972 and was also an assistant coach for the Kentucky Wildcats men's basketball team from 1970 to 1980 under Joe B. Hall. He attended the University of Kentucky from 1957 to 1961 where he played both baseball and basketball.

== Early years ==
Parson was born in Yancey, Kentucky and attended Harlan High School where he ran track and played baseball, basketball and football. He attended the University of Kentucky where he was a two sport athlete. In baseball, he was all-SEC in 1959 and 1961 and All-American in 1961.

== Coaching career ==
=== Baseball ===
==== Head coaching record ====
Below is a table of Parson's yearly records as a collegiate head baseball coach. He served in 3 seasons between 1970 and 1972.

Record table
Season	Team	Overall	Conference	Standing	Postseason
Kentucky (Southeastern Conference) (1970–1972)
1970	Kentucky	8-19	2-12	6th (East)	
1971	Kentucky	18-15	7-8	5th (East)	
1972	Kentucky	16-10-1	4-8	5th (East)	
Total:		42-43-1			
National champion Postseason invitational champion Conference regular season champion Conference regular season and conference tournament champion Division regular season champion Division regular season and conference tournament champion Conference tournament champion
