= Kentucky Fight =

Song

Kentucky Fight is a fight song at the University of Kentucky. It is a fairly traditional-sounding march, and the lyrics are almost never sung. The song has three verses: one is generic, one is for football, and one is for basketball.

== Lyrics ==
Normal Verse:

Kentucky! We will beat the foe!
Kentucky! Onward we’ll go
Kentucky! We will hail to thee
And victorious we will be today
Rah! Rah! Rah!

Basketball Verse:

Kentucky! Dribble down the floor!
Kentucky! Fight for ev’ry score!
And you’ll win for the blue and white
So yea! You wildcats!

Football verse:

Kentucky! Hit that line real hard!
Kentucky! Fight for ev’ry yard!
And you’ll win for the blue and white!
So yea! You wildcats!
Fight! Fight! Fight!

Normal verse:

Kentucky! We will beat the foe!
Kentucky! Onward we will go!
Kentucky! We will hail to thee
And victory will be today!
