= Bill Black (baseball coach) =

American baseball coach (1920–2002)

Biographical details
- Born: September 25, 1920; Paducah, Kentucky, U.S.
- Died: May 1, 2002 (aged 81)

Playing career

Football
- 1940: Kentucky

Baseball
- 1940: Kentucky
- 1942: Kentucky

Coaching career (HC unless noted)

Baseball
- 1942: Kentucky

Head coaching record
- Overall: 7–6

William Ray Black (September 25, 1920 – May 1, 2002) was an American construction executive and college baseball coach.

== Early life ==
Black was born and raised in Paducah, Kentucky, where his father, Ray owned a construction business. He attended the University of Kentucky and graduated in 1942 from the University of Kentucky College of Education. He played baseball and football at UK and during his senior year, served as player-coach of the baseball team. The Kentucky Wildcats baseball team had a record of seven wins and six losses under his leadership.

== Later life ==
After graduation from UK, Black enlisted in the US Army during World War II. After the war, he worked for the family business, by then called Ray Black & Son. He served the University of Kentucky by serving four terms as alumni representative to the university's board of trustees. He also served for 22 years on the Paducah Board of Education.
