= A. J. Reed =

American baseball player (born 1993)

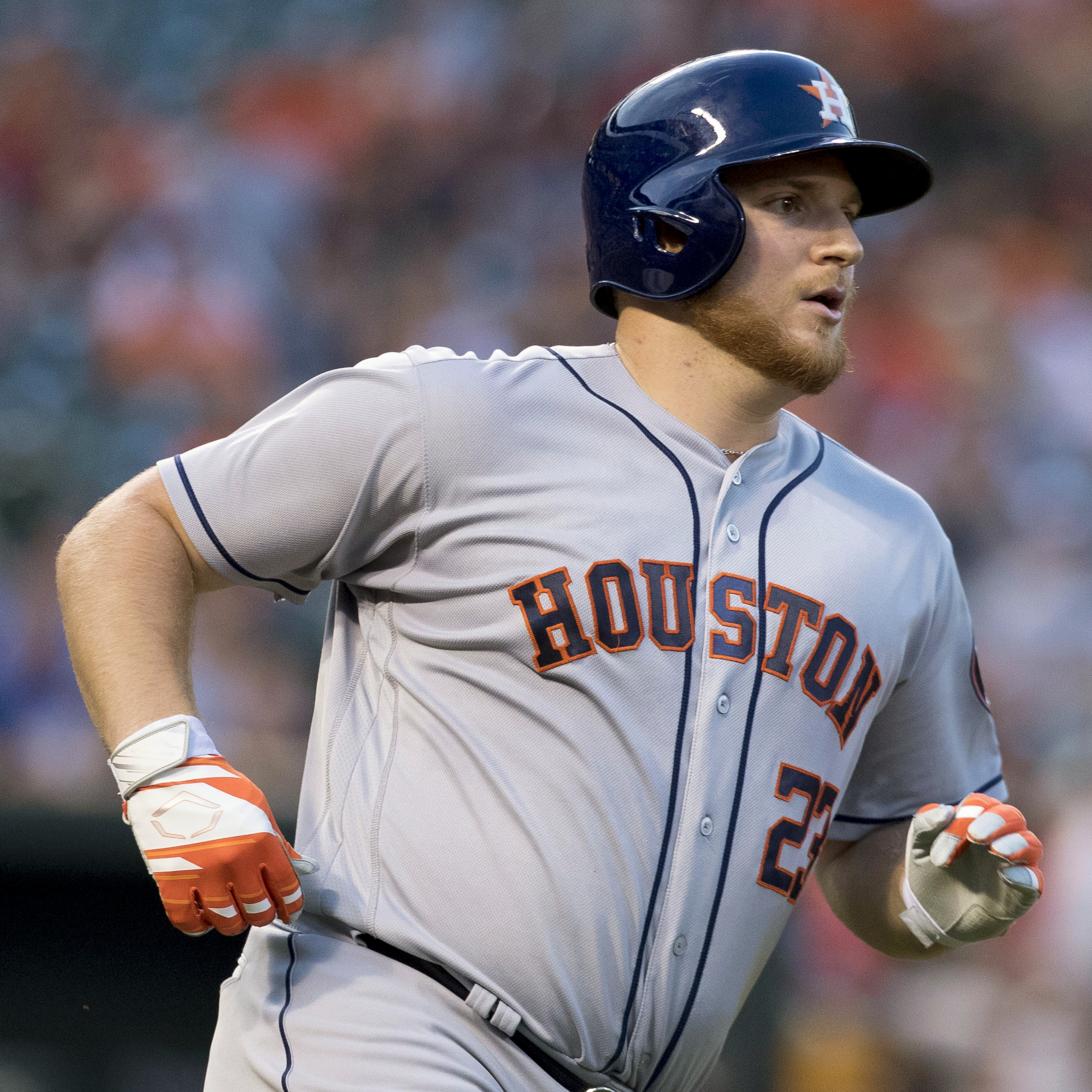
- Reed with the Houston Astros in 2016
- First baseman
- Born: May 10, 1993 (age 32); Terre Haute, Indiana, U.S.
- Batted: Left Threw: Left

MLB debut
- June 25, 2016, for the Houston Astros

Last MLB appearance
- August 1, 2019, for the Chicago White Sox

Career statistics
- Batting average: .149
- Home runs: 4
- Runs batted in: 12
- Stats at Baseball Reference

Teams
- Houston Astros (2016–2018); Chicago White Sox (2019)

Career highlights and awards
- Golden Spikes Award (2014); Dick Howser Trophy (2014)

Andrew Joseph Reed (born May 10, 1993) is an American former professional baseball first baseman. He played in Major League Baseball (MLB) for the Houston Astros and Chicago White Sox. He played college baseball at Kentucky and was drafted by the Astros in the second round of the 2014 MLB draft.

== Early years ==
Reed attended Terre Haute South Vigo High School in Terre Haute, Indiana. During his career he hit .425 with 41 home runs and 150 runs batted in (RBI) as a batter and was 26–10 record with a 1.88 earned run average (ERA), and 390 strikeouts in 260 innings as a pitcher. Reed was drafted by the New York Mets in the 25th round of the 2011 Major League Baseball draft, but did not sign and attended the University of Kentucky.

== College career ==
While at Kentucky he was considered one of the best two-way players in college baseball. As a freshman in 2012 at the Kentucky he became the first consensus first-team freshman All-American in Kentucky's baseball history. He played in 55 games with 51 starts, hitting .300 with four home runs and 43 runs batted in as a batter. As a pitcher he went 5–3 with a 2.52 ERA and 51 strikeouts over 16 games (five starts). As a sophomore in 2013 he started all 55 games and started 14 games as a pitcher. As a batter he hit .280 with 13 home runs and 52 runs batted in. As a pitcher he was 2–8 with a 4.04 ERA and 52 strikeouts. In 2012 and 2013, he played collegiate summer baseball with the Harwich Mariners of the Cape Cod Baseball League.

As a junior in 2014, Reed hit .336/.476/.735 and led the nation in home runs with 23. As a pitcher he was 12–2 with a 2.09 ERA and 71 strikeouts. He was the winner of the Golden Spikes Award and the Dick Howser Trophy. He also won numerous other awards, including the John Olerud Award, SEC Player of the Year, National Player of the Year from Collegiate Baseball and American Baseball Coaches Association, as well as Baseball America College Player Of The Year. He was also the SEC Male Athlete of the Year for all sports.

== Professional career ==
=== Houston Astros ===
Reed was drafted by the Houston Astros in the second round, with the 42nd overall selection, of the 2014 Major League Baseball draft. He signed on June 11. Reed hit 34 home runs for the Lancaster JetHawks of the High-A California League and Corpus Christi Hooks of the Double-A Texas League in the 2015 season, winning the Joe Bauman Home Run Award.

Reed began the 2016 season with the Fresno Grizzlies of the Triple-A Pacific Coast League. He was called up and made his major league debut on June 25, 2016. On July 1, 2016, he recorded his first Major League hit with a single against Chicago White Sox. Next day he hit his first Major League home run off Chicago White Sox pitcher David Robertson.

On March 21, 2017, he was optioned back to the Fresno Grizzlies of the Triple-A Pacific Coast League. Reed appeared in only 2 games for the Astros in 2017 without recording a stat in 6 at-bats. Reed earned his first World Series Championship ring.

On June 28, 2018, Reed was recalled to the Astros when Yuli Gurriel was on a 3-day paternity leave. He was optioned back to the Grizzlies on July 3. During Reed's cup of coffee, he appeared in one game, with three at bats and no hits.

On July 2, 2019, Reed was designated for assignment by the Astros; he had been hitting .224/.329/.469 with 12 home runs and 35 RBI in 56 games for the Triple-A Round Rock Express.

=== Chicago White Sox ===
On July 8, 2019, the Chicago White Sox claimed Reed off waivers. In 14 appearances for Chicago, he went 6-for-44 (.136) with one home run and four RBI. On August 16, Reed was removed from the 40-man roster and sent outright to the Triple-A Charlotte Knights. In 2019, he had the slowest sprint speed of all major league designated hitters, at 23.2 feet/second. On March 4, 2020, Reed announced his retirement from professional baseball at the age of 26.

== Personal life ==
Reed is married to Shelbie Scamihorn, his high school sweetheart. Scamihorn played college softball at Ball State University in Muncie, Indiana. They have two pet cockatoos.
