= Ryan Strieby =

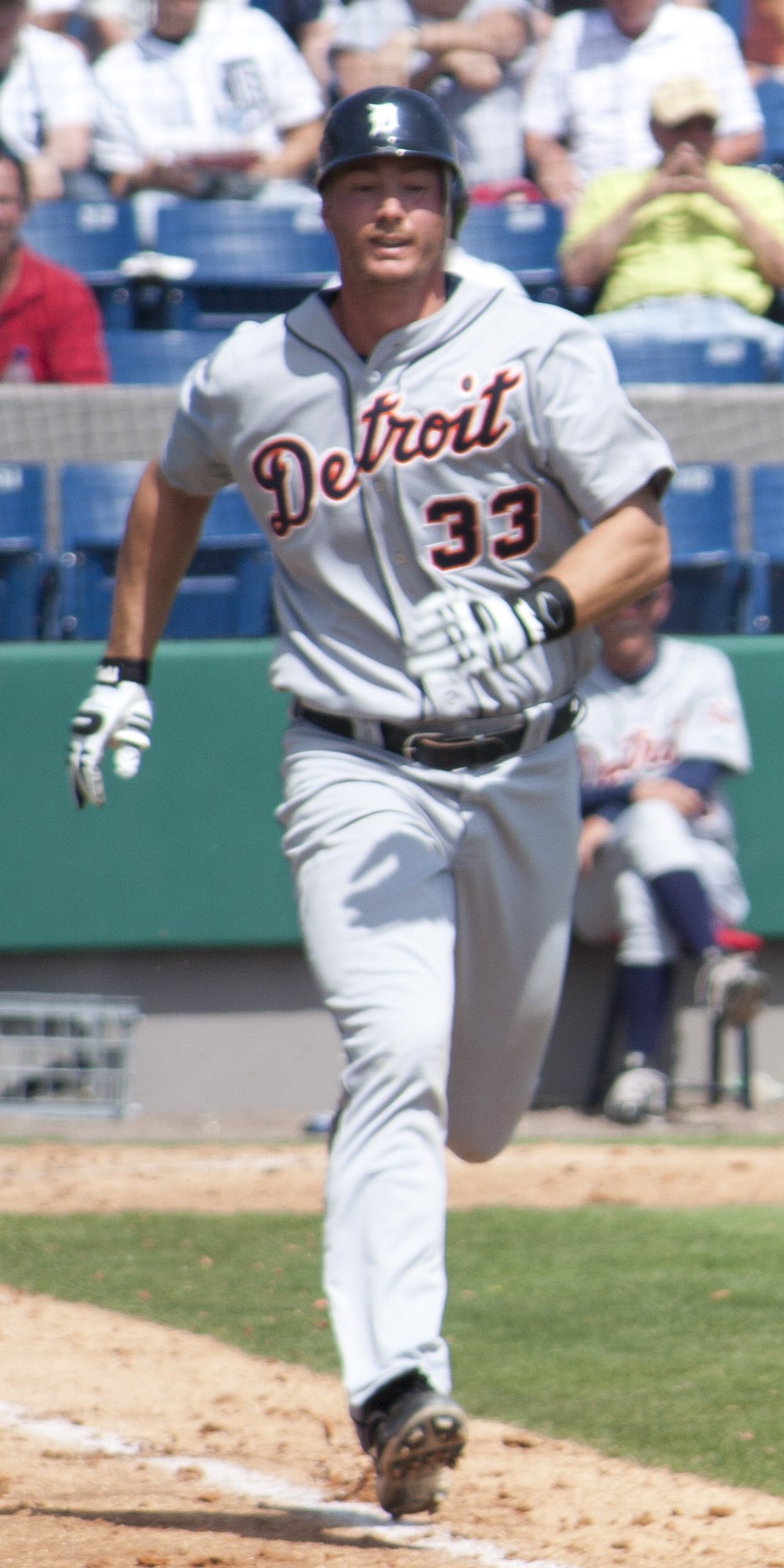
- Strieby with the Detroit Tigers
- First baseman / Outfielder
- Born: August 9, 1985 (age 40); Seattle, Washington, U.S.
- Bats: Right Throws: Right
- Stats at Baseball Reference

Ryan Kristoffer Strieby (born August 9, 1985) is an American former professional baseball first baseman.

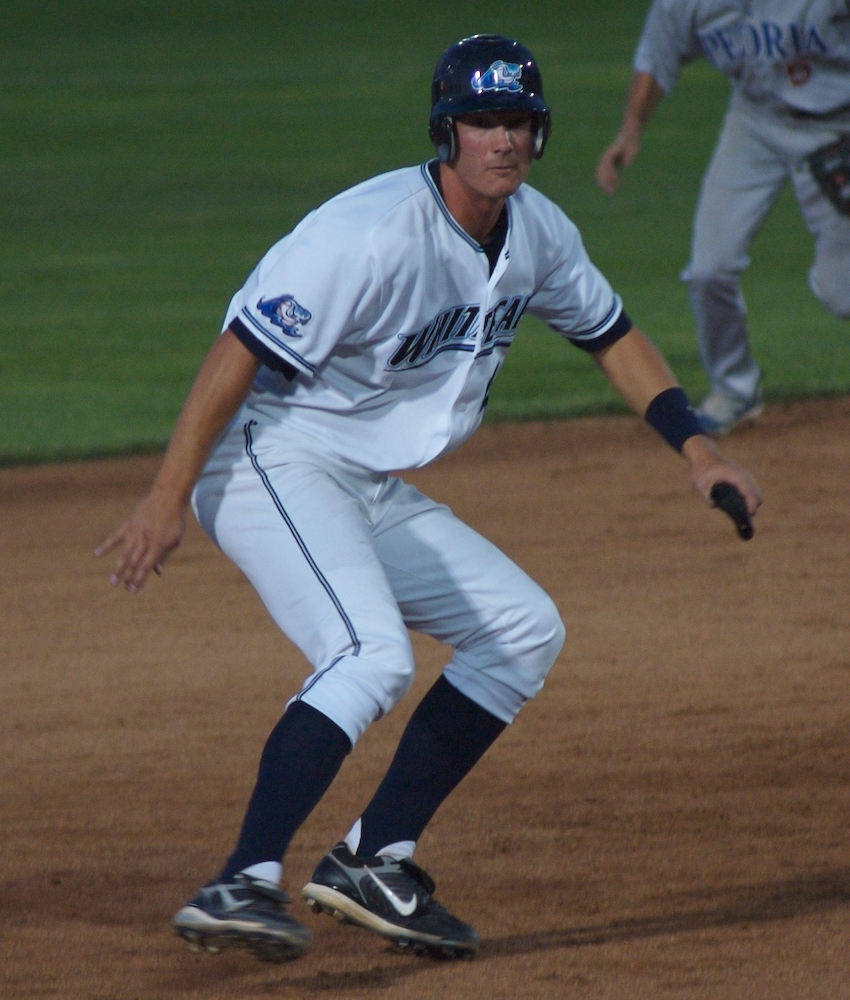
Strieby playing for the West Michigan Whitecaps, Single-A affiliates of the Detroit Tigers, in 2007

Strieby played baseball and basketball at Mountlake Terrace High School in Mountlake Terrace, Washington. He attended Edmonds Community College, and although he was drafted by the Los Angeles Dodgers after his freshman year, he did not sign with them. He decided to pursue college, and after his sophomore season at Edmonds, he left for the University of Kentucky.

After leading the University of Kentucky to the 2006 Southeastern Conference (SEC) Championship, Strieby was drafted in the fourth round of the 2006 Major League Baseball draft by the Detroit Tigers. In the same year, he was named the SEC Player of the Year and a First-Team All American by the American Baseball Coaches Association and Baseball America.

Strieby has advanced in minor league levels each year since 2006 when he began with the Oneonta Tigers. In 2007, he played for the West Michigan Whitecaps. In 2008, he broke the Lakeland Flying Tigers franchise record with 29 home runs in a season earning Tigers Minor League Players of the Year. In 2009, Strieby played for the Erie SeaWolves where he debuted with two home runs in his first game. In 2010, he played for the Toledo Mud Hens.

Strieby was released from the Tigers organization in 2012, ending his seven-year career with the club. On July 18, 2012, he signed a minor league deal with the Arizona Diamondbacks and was sent to the Diamondbacks Double-A affiliate, the Mobile BayBears. He finished the 2012 season with the Diamondbacks Triple-A affiliate, the Reno Aces.

He became a free agent after the 2015 season from the Camden Riversharks.
