= John Cohen (baseball) =

American athletic director (born 1966)

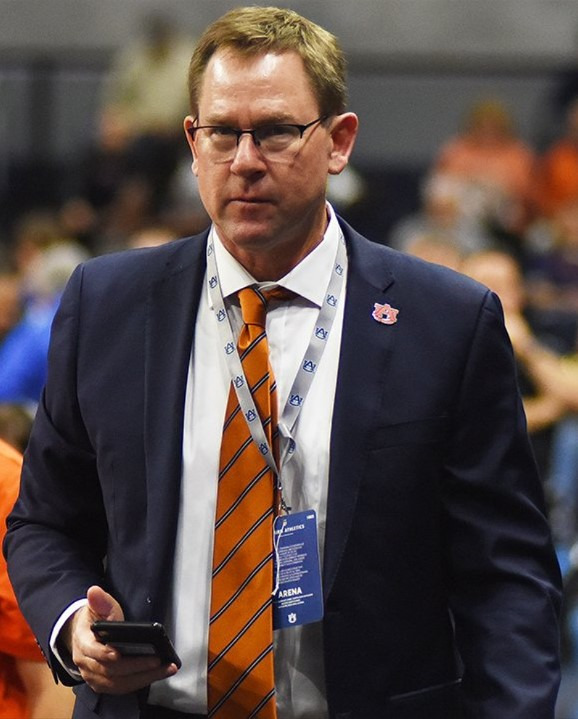
- Cohen at Neville Arena in 2022

Current position
- Title: Athletic director
- Team: Auburn
- Conference: SEC

Biographical details
- Born: September 21, 1966 (age 60); Tuscaloosa, Alabama, U.S.
- Education: Mississippi State University (BS); University of Missouri (MS)

Playing career
- 1986: Birmingham–Southern
- 1987–1990: Mississippi State
- 1990–1991: Visalia Oaks
- Position: Outfielder

Coaching career (HC unless noted)
- 1992–1997: Missouri (asst.)
- 1998–2001: Northwestern State
- 2002–2003: Florida (asst.)
- 2004–2008: Kentucky
- 2009–2016: Mississippi State

Administrative career (AD unless noted)
- 2016: Mississippi State (assoc. AD)
- 2016–2022: Mississippi State
- 2022–present: Auburn

Head coaching record
- Overall: 605–399–2 (.602)

Accomplishments and honors

Championships
- 1998 Southland Conference; 2001 Southland Conference; 2006 Southeastern Conference; 2012 SEC Tournament; 2013 College World Series Runner-up; 2016 Southeastern Conference; Governor's Cup Record 4–4

Awards
- 1998 Southland Conference Coach of the Year; 2001 Southland Conference Coach of the Year; 2005 USA Baseball National Team; 2006 Southeastern Conference Coach of the Year; 2006 ABCA South Region Coach of the Year; 2006 National Coach of the Year; 2013 ABCA South Region Coach of the Year; 2016 Southeastern Conference Coach of the Year

John Cohen (born September 21, 1966) is an American former baseball player and coach who is currently the 16th athletic director for the Auburn University Tigers. He is former head baseball coach of Mississippi State University, where he also served as the athletic director from 2016 to 2022.

== Playing career ==
Cohen played college baseball at Mississippi State (1988–1990) after spending a single season at Birmingham–Southern College in Alabama (1986). In 1989, he played collegiate summer baseball with the Hyannis Mets of the Cape Cod Baseball League and was named a league all-star. He also played on the 1990 College World Series team his senior year at Mississippi State. He then spent two years in the Minnesota Twins farm system (1990–1991).

== Coaching career ==
Cohen served as an assistant coach at the University of Missouri from 1992 to 1997 before becoming head coach at Northwestern State University from 1998 to 2001, where he won two conference championships. He moved on to the University of Florida for two seasons (2002–2003) as an assistant before accepting the head coaching job at the University of Kentucky. On June 6, 2008, Cohen was announced as the head coach of his alma mater, Mississippi State.

== Tenure as athletic director ==
John Cohen became the new Auburn athletic director in November 2022, replacing Allen Greene. In Cohen's previous stop, he was AD at his alma mater, Mississippi State University. John Cohen guided the Bulldog program to record-breaking success since being announced as the school's 17th director of athletics on November 4, 2016. Cohen leads a department that encompasses 16 sports and more than 350 student-athletes.

The former MSU head baseball coach and two-time Southeastern Conference Coach of the Year oversaw arguably the greatest era in Bulldog athletics history, highlighted by a 2021 College World Series Championship for the school's first team national title in any sport. Under Cohen's watch, 44 teams advanced to NCAA postseason play, including a school-record 13 during the 2018-19 athletic year. That occurred just a year after the Bulldogs produced a then-school-record 12 postseason squads during the 2017-18 athletic campaign.

In the classroom, MSU student-athletes continued to set new standards, achieving a department GPA of 3.0 or higher for nine consecutive semesters while continuing to exceed the national APR multiyear rate in all sports. Most recently, Bulldog student-athletes turned in a 3.1 GPA in the fall of 2021 with 11 sports recording at least a 3.0 GPA.

A nationally respected leader within intercollegiate athletics, Cohen served on the prestigious 10-member NCAA Division I Baseball Committee as part of a four-year term that began on September 1, 2019. Sixteen individuals have played and coached in the College World Series. Cohen is one of two among that elite group, who have played, coached and later served as director of athletics for a participating school. He is one of three active SEC athletics directors to hire an eventual national championship-winning head coach in any sport.

During the 2021-22 athletic year, football became one of eight programs nationally and four in the SEC to make a bowl game in each of the last dozen years, joining Alabama, Georgia and Texas A&M as the only conference teams to do so. The Bulldogs were one of four teams in the nation with three wins against opponents ranked in the final College Football Playoff Top 25 and the only team in the nation that faced six teams in the final rankings during the season. In the classroom, head coach Mike Leach's squad turned in a record GPA for the second straight semester.

Volleyball made the program's first NCAA tournament appearance after earning an at-large bid. The Bulldogs rewrote the record books, posting a 25–6 overall record and 16–2 mark in SEC play to finish second overall in the conference. Head coach Julie Darty Dennis was named the 2021 SEC Coach of the Year and the 2021 AVCA South Region Coach of the Year after leading the Bulldogs to the most successful season in program history. Dennis became the first coach in MSU volleyball history to take home Coach of the Year honors.

State's 2020-21 athletic year featured unprecedented success in the sport of baseball. Tanner Allen earned the SEC's Player of the Year award, head coach Chris Lemonis garnered National Coach of the Year accolades, and most notably, the Bulldogs won the College World Series in Omaha, Nebraska, among 25,000-plus members of the Bulldog family.

Football claimed its first win over a ranked opponent in a bowl game since 1940. Men's basketball turned in a runner-up finish at the 2021 NIT, earning a bid in postseason play for the third straight year. Softball finished the regular season winning seven straight SEC games and reached the NCAA tournament for the 16th time. Track and field was well-represented in Tokyo, Japan, at the Olympic Games with six Bulldogs competing for their respective countries. Eight members of the track and field earned All-America honors at either the indoor or outdoor NCAA Track and Field Championships, and the men's team finished ranked inside the top 15 nationally. Meanwhile, Bulldog student-athletes enjoyed success in the classroom again during the spring of 2021, posting the highest department GPA for a semester ever at 3.2. Four programs (baseball, men's basketball, football and women's golf) recorded their highest-ever spring GPA, while football's GPA marked its highest ever at the time.

MSU student-athletes continue to earn opportunities to compete at the next level. In 2020, MSU was the only school in the country with multiple players selected in each of the NFL, MLB and NBA drafts.

Though several sport seasons were cut short in 2019-20 due to COVID-19, Bulldog student-athletes posted many outstanding achievements. Football reached a bowl game to conclude the decade as one of only five SEC programs to go to a bowl every season from 2010 to 2019. A few months later, MSU made history when it became the first school to sweep all four Mississippi Sports Hall of Fame and Museum awards in the same athletic year for the best player in the state of Mississippi and was on its way to accomplishing the feat again prior to the cancellation of spring sports. Baseball finished ranked among the top 10 and saw a program-record three student-athletes picked in the first two rounds of the 2020 MLB First Year Player Draft. Women's basketball competed in its fifth consecutive SEC Tournament title game. Only Tennessee (1988–92) matches that mark for most consecutive championship game appearances in SEC Tournament history. Women's basketball ended the year ranked inside the top 10 of the AP Poll for the fourth year in a row, finishing the season ranked ninth. Softball turned in 25 wins which tied for the most in the country and earned its highest final ranking in program history at No. 20.

Cohen hired 12 head coaches during his tenure, including Mike Leach who is a two-time national coach of the year, three-time conference coach of the year and the mastermind behind the NCAA record-setting “Air Raid” offense. The accomplishments for Leach in his 20 years as a head coach are long and distinguished. Leach, a proven winner, has earned 150 career victories, which is tied for the fourth most as an FBS head coach among active coaches. He has guided his squads to 18 bowl games, produced seven seasons of at least nine victories and captured two conference division titles. Leach is the winningest coach in Texas Tech history and owns school records for bowl appearances at both Texas Tech (10) and Washington State (6).

Cohen's third athletic year in charge was a historic one. MSU captured three SEC team championships during 2018–19 as women's basketball and men's tennis defended their respective crowns. Women's basketball also secured its first-ever SEC Tournament championship before going onto an Elite Eight appearance and finishing as high as No. 4 in the national polls.

The Bulldogs combined for 151 victories in the sports of football, men's and women's basketball, softball and baseball in 2018–19, representing the highest total in the SEC. MSU tied for the national lead with the most first-round selections in the NFL, NBA, WNBA and MLB Drafts with five. The five first-round picks are the most by MSU in a calendar year in its history.

In the summer of 2018, Cohen identified one of the top recruiters and player development coaches in the country to serve as the Diamond Dawgs’ 18th head baseball skipper. Chris Lemonis became the winningest first-year head coach in SEC history as MSU won 52 games en route to its second consecutive College World Series appearance in Omaha, Nebraska. The Diamond Dawgs earned a national seed (No. 6), hosted regional and super regionals at the new Dudy Noble Field, clinched a share of the SEC Western Division title and finished as high as No. 3 in the final polls.

In addition, the Bulldog men's and women's basketball programs both appeared in the NCAA tournament during the same season for the first time since 2008–09.

The 2017-18 athletic year saw State become the only school in the nation to win a bowl game, reach an NCAA Final Four – men's or women's – and the College World Series. During that same campaign, MSU claimed multiple SEC championships in a single athletic year for the first time since 1996. Women's basketball earned its first SEC regular season title with a perfect 30–0 regular season and a second-straight NCAA national championship game appearance. Matt Roberts, the SEC Coach of the Year, guided the men's tennis team to its first SEC Tournament championship since 1996.

As a result of the Bulldogs’ unprecedented athletic success, CBS Sports named MSU the 14th-best athletics program in the country and fourth overall in the SEC for 2017–18. The top four Director's Cup finishes in school history have occurred in the last four years with three under Cohen's watch.

Since becoming athletic director, Cohen was the driving force for numerous facility projects on campus, including the new $68 million Dudy Noble Field, which opened in full capacity in the spring of 2019. The ballpark features the Left Field Lofts, an experience with luxury two-bedroom suites offering views of the new Dudy Noble Field.

Cohen approved construction of a new $3.6 million football game-day home locker room and recruiting center inside the north end of Davis Wade Stadium. The 11,100 square-foot locker room, which opened in September 2018, includes custom-built player lockers, separate coaches and staff locker rooms, an expansive athletic training room as well as an equipment room. In July 2019, state-of-the-art updates were completed in the Leo Seal Jr. Football Complex locker room, which serves as the daily headquarters for MSU football.

The Templeton Athletic Academic Center underwent a major renovation in the summer of 2018 with modern wall graphics and displays. In addition, ground was broken in the summer of 2019 on the $8 million-dollar MSU Tennis Pavilion which was completed in the fall of 2020. The 48,815-square-foot facility features six indoor courts, elevated spectator seating, LED lighting and more.

Cohen was instrumental in providing a “championship-level fan experience” at all of MSU's athletic venues. For the first time in school history, State drew over 1 million combined fans in the ticketed sports of football, men's and women's basketball and baseball during the 2018-19 athletic year. In the summer of 2018, MSU announced significant price decreases on all food and beverage at concessions for all home venues that continues today. State also unveiled a football season ticket price reduction in several sections of Davis Wade Stadium.

Cohen's vision launched the Hail State Family Fan Experience survey, an initiative to best serve Bulldog fans based on their feedback. The plan has been responsible for numerous enhancements at venues, including improved sound at Davis Wade Stadium and boosted cell service for major carriers.

Cohen is the only coach in SEC history to win an SEC championship, SEC tournament championship, and advance to the College World Series both as a player and head coach. He and Ron Polk are the only two baseball coaches in SEC history to lead multiple schools to SEC titles. His 2013 Bulldog club advanced to the CWS championship series for the first time in MSU history. Cohen also had the privilege of being a part of a College World Series as a player, head coach and now three times as an athletic director when the Diamond Dawgs reached Omaha in June 2018, 2019 and 2021. His 2012 club produced an SEC record-tying eight Major Leaguers.

== Head coaching record ==
Record table
Season	Team	Overall	Conference	Standing	Postseason
Northwestern State Demons (Southland Conference) (1998–2001)
1998	Northwestern State	40–20	15–8	1st	
1999	Northwestern State	38–21	18–9	2nd	
2000	Northwestern State	30–26	14–13	T–5th	
2001	Northwestern State	38–17	19–8	1st	
Northwestern State:		146–84 (.635)	66–38 (.635)		
Kentucky Wildcats (Southeastern Conference) (2004–2008)
2004	Kentucky	24–30	7–23	6th (East)	
2005	Kentucky	29–27	7–22	6th (East)	
2006	Kentucky	44–17	20–10	1st (East)	NCAA Regional
2007	Kentucky	34–19–1	13–16–1	5th (East)	
2008	Kentucky	44–19	16–14	3rd (East)	NCAA Regional
Kentucky:		175–112–1 (.609)	63–85–1 (.426)		
Mississippi State Bulldogs (Southeastern Conference) (2009–present)
2009	Mississippi State	25–29	9–20	6th (West)	
2010	Mississippi State	23–33	6–24	6th (West)	
2011	Mississippi State	38–25	14–16	T–2nd (West)	NCAA Super Regional
2012	Mississippi State	40–24	16–14	T–2nd (West)	NCAA Regional
2013	Mississippi State	51–20	16–14	3rd (West)	College World Series Runner-up
2014	Mississippi State	39–24	18–12	3rd (West)	NCAA Regional
2015	Mississippi State	24–30	8–22	7th (West)	
2016	Mississippi State	44–18–1	21–9	1st (West)	NCAA Super Regional (#6 National Seed)
Mississippi State:		284–203–1 (.583)	108–130 (.454)		
Total:		605–399–2 (.602)			
National champion Postseason invitational champion Conference regular season champion Conference regular season and conference tournament champion Division regular season champion Division regular season and conference tournament champion Conference tournament champion

== Coaching tree ==
Assistant coaches under John Cohen who are, or have been, head coaches include Gary Henderson, Nick Mingione, and Butch Thompson.

== Personal life ==
John Cohen is originally from Tuscaloosa, Alabama, as is his wife, Nelle Bashinsky Cohen. They have a son and a daughter. Cohen is Jewish.
