= Gary Henderson (baseball coach) =

American baseball player and coach (born 1961)

Current position
- Title: Head coach
- Team: Utah
- Conference: Big 12
- Record: 128–135–2 (.487)

Biographical details
- Born: February 3, 1961 (age 65); Eugene, Oregon, U.S.
- Education: San Diego State University

Playing career
- 1980: Linfield
- 1982–1984: San Diego State
- Position: Pitcher

Coaching career (HC unless noted)
- 1988: San Diego State (JV HC)
- 1989: Cal State Fullerton (Asst.)
- 1990: Riverside CC (Asst.)
- 1991–1992: Chapman (Asst.)
- 1993: Chapman
- 1994: Pepperdine (Asst.)
- 1995–1998: Florida (Asst.)
- 1999–2002: Oregon State (Asst.)
- 2003–2008: Kentucky (Asst.)
- 2009–2016: Kentucky
- 2016–2018: Mississippi State (Asst.)
- 2018: Mississippi State (Interim)
- 2020–2021: Utah (Asst.)
- 2022–present: Utah

Head coaching record
- Overall: 447–392–2 (.533)

Accomplishments and honors

Awards
- 1996 Collegiate Baseball National Assistant Coach of the Year; 2012 SEC Coach of the Year; 2018 Perfect Game/Rawlings Coach Of The Year; 2018 National College Baseball Writers Association Coach Of The Year

Gary Henderson (born February 3, 1961) is an American college baseball coach and former pitcher who is the current head baseball coach for the Utah Utes. He played college baseball at Linfield College in 1980 and at San Diego State for head coach Jim Dietz from 1982 to 1984. He was the head coach of the Chapman Panthers (1993), the Kentucky Wildcats (2009–2016) and the Mississippi State Bulldogs (2018).

== Playing career ==
Henderson pitched one year at Linfield College before transferring to San Diego State University, compiling a 19–5 career record at the two schools.

== Coaching career ==
Henderson started coaching at his alma mater, San Diego State, as the junior varsity head coach. He had assistant coaching stints at Cal State Fullerton, Riverside Community College, Chapman College (served as head coach for 1 season), and Pepperdine.

Henderson became an assistant at Florida in 1995. Following a trip to the 1996 College World Series, he was named the National Assistant Coach of the Year by Collegiate Baseball newspaper. With Henderson's assistance, Florida returned to the 1998 College World Series. After a successful stay at Florida, he moved back to the west coast as an assistant coach at Oregon State.

In 2003, he joined John Cohen's staff at Kentucky as the associate head coach. Following the 2008 season, Cohen accepted the head coaching position at his alma mater, Mississippi State, resulting in Henderson's promotion to head coach.

In 2012, Henderson was named Southeastern Conference Coach of the Year.

On June 1, 2016, Henderson resigned as Kentucky Baseball Coach, citing burnout due to the demands of being a head coach in the SEC.

In June 2016, Henderson was named pitching coach at Mississippi State, re-joining John Cohen.

In February 2018, Henderson was named interim head coach at Mississippi State after Andy Cannizaro resigned due to off the field indiscretions. After a poor start, the team turned around and reached the college world series. As a result, Henderson was named the National Collegiate Baseball Writers Coach of the Year. Despite the success of the team, Mississippi State did not retain Henderson as head coach.

On June 20, 2019, Henderson was named the associate head coach at the University of Utah. When Bill Kinneberg resigned as head coach of the Utes, Henderson was elevated to head coach.

== Head coaching record ==
Record table
Season	Team	Overall	Conference	Standing	Postseason
Chapman Panthers (Southern California Intercollegiate Athletic Conference) (1993)
1993	Chapman	22–32			
Chapman:		22–32 (.407)			
Kentucky Wildcats (Southeastern Conference) (2009–2016)
2009	Kentucky	28–26	12–18	5th (East)	
2010	Kentucky	31–25	13–17	4th (East)	
2011	Kentucky	25–30	8–22	5th (East)	
2012	Kentucky	45–18	18–12	T–2nd (East)	NCAA Regional
2013	Kentucky	30–25	11–19	4th (East)	
2014	Kentucky	37–25	14–16	4th (East)	NCAA Regional
2015	Kentucky	30–25	14–15	4th (East)	
2016	Kentucky	32–25	15–15	4th (East)	
Kentucky:		258–199 (.565)	105–134 (.439)		
Mississippi State Bulldogs (Southeastern Conference) (2018)
2018	Mississippi State	39–26	15–15	T–3rd (West)	College World Series
Mississippi State:		39–26 (.600)	15–15 (.500)		
Utah Utes (Pac-12 Conference) (2022–2024)
2022	Utah	26–27–1	10–20	10th	
2023	Utah	22–32–1	9–20–1	11th	
2024	Utah	33–22	16–14	7th	Pac-12 Tournament
Utah Utes (Big 12 Conference) (2025–present)
2025	Utah	21–29	8–22	14th	
2026	Utah	26–25	12–18	10th	
Utah:		128–135–2 (.487)	55–93–1 (.372)		
Total:		447–392–2 (.533)			
National champion Postseason invitational champion Conference regular season champion Conference regular season and conference tournament champion Division regular season champion Division regular season and conference tournament champion Conference tournament champion
