= Jeff Abbott (baseball) =

American baseball player (born 1972)

- Outfielder
- Born: August 17, 1972 (age 53); Atlanta, Georgia, U.S.
- Batted: Right Threw: Left

MLB debut
- June 10, 1997, for the Chicago White Sox

Last MLB appearance
- September 29, 2001, for the Florida Marlins

MLB statistics
- Batting average: .263
- Home runs: 18
- Runs batted in: 83
- Stats at Baseball Reference

Teams
- Chicago White Sox (1997–2000); Florida Marlins (2001)

Jeffrey William Abbott (born August 17, 1972) is an American former professional baseball player who played outfield in Major League Baseball (MLB) from 1997 to 2001. He played for the Chicago White Sox and Florida Marlins.

== Career ==
Abbott attended Dunwoody High School, in Dunwoody, Georgia and the University of Kentucky. He was first drafted by the Chicago White Sox in the 32nd round (901st overall) of the 1993 MLB draft, but decided not to sign the contract offered to him. He was then drafted by the Chicago White Sox, again, in the 4th round (117th overall) of the 1994 MLB draft.

Abbott began his minor league career with the Hickory Crawdads of the ‘A’ ball league Southern Atlantic League (North). After just four games he was called up to the GCL White Sox in the Gulf Coast League in 1994. In 63 games with the GCL White Sox he batted .393 with six home runs and 48 RBI. He began the 1995 season at advanced A ball league Prince William Cannons and in 70 games he batted .348 with four home runs and 48 RBI, before advancing to AA Birmingham Barons of the Southern League. In 55 games with the Barons he had three home runs and 28 RBI while batting with an average of .320.

The 1996 season saw Abbott playing for the AAA Nashville Sounds of the American Association where he would remain all year as the team's starting left fielder. There, in 113 games Abbott batted .325 with 14 home runs and 60 RBI while stealing 12 bases. He led the Trams starters in HR's and had the third highest batting average on the team. He was with Nashville for the 1997 season as well where he again batted over .300, this time hitting at .327 with 11 home runs and 63 RBI while again swiping a dozen bases, before getting the call to join the MLB in June of that year.

Abbott made his first MLB plate appearance for the Chicago White Sox on June 10, 1997, against the New York Yankees’ Andy Pettite grounding into a double play. He collected his first two major league hits the next day off the Yankees Kenny Rogers. His first major league home run would come on September 15 in Milwaukee off the Brewers Cal Eldred. He would remain with the White Sox for the remainder of the season, playing ten errorless games in the outfield, and hitting .263 over 19 games with two RBI, and the lone home run. Abbott remained with the big club for the 1998 season, as the team's 4th outfielder. Abbott posted fairly respectable numbers averaging .279 with 12 home runs to with 41 RBI in 89 games that season, but his defense declined, as he committed four errors, for a rather poor .971 fielding average. Abbott began the 1999 campaign again with the White Sox, but following a poor first month (.158 avg. 2 HRs and only six RBI) he was demoted to the AAA Charlotte Knights of the International League where he regained his form with the bat to hit .318 with nine homers and 37 RBI in the 67 games he appeared.

2000 had Abbott back in Chicago for another season with the White Sox. While hitting for average once again (.274) his power numbers dropped (only three home runs) along with 29 RBI over 80 games, where again Abbott served as an extra outfielder and occasional Designated Hitter. He saw his only postseason action in game 2 of the American League Division Series in which the White Sox were swept in 3 games by the Seattle Mariners. In December 2000, Abbott was traded to the Florida Marlins in exchange for outfielder Julio Ramirez. Abbott opened the 2001 season in the Marlins farm system. He played briefly in both A and AA ball before batting .320 with 9 home runs and 24 RBI with the AAA Calgary Cannons of the Pacific Coast League before getting the call to the Marlins the end of July. With Florida, Abbott appeared in just 28 games in what would be his final major league season, and batted .262 with five RBI and no home runs primarily as a pinch hitter. Abbott was granted free agency following the 2001 season and signed with Boston Red Sox affiliate Pawtucket in the International League. Here he platooned in the outfield, while hitting .283 with ten home runs and 41 RBI in 100 games. The following season, Abbott's last in professional baseball, was spent with the AAA Tacoma Rainiers the Seattle Mariners farm team, but he appeared in only four games, getting only two hits in fifteen at bats.

.
