= Keith Madison =

American baseball coach

Biographical details
- Born: October 24, 1951 (age 75); Brownsville, Kentucky, U.S.

Coaching career (HC unless noted)
- 1979–2003: Kentucky

Keith Madison (born 1951) is a former head coach of the Kentucky Wildcats baseball team. He coached the Wildcats from 1979 to 2003, and remains the most winning baseball coach in the history of UK Baseball.

== Playing career ==
Madison was born in Brownsville, Kentucky and played high school baseball and basketball for Edmonson County High School.

He signed a professional baseball contract with the Montreal Expos Major League Baseball Club as a 17 year old in 1969, reaching AAA (Winnipeg Whips) by the age of 19.

In 1972, Madison signed with the Cincinnati Reds Major League Baseball Club, playing in Tampa and Trois-Rivières (Quebec) before being released in 1974.

During the off-season, Madison attended college at Western Kentucky University where he graduated in 1975.

== Coaching career ==
Madison began his coaching career at Lake Wales High School in Lake Wales, Florida in 1976. The following year, he was offered the graduate assistant position at Mississippi State University under the tutelage of legendary coach, Ron Polk. Upon completing his master's degree at Mississippi State, Madison was hired as the head baseball coach at the University of Kentucky at age 26 in July 1978. At the time, he was the youngest head baseball coach in NCAA Division l.

In his first season at Kentucky, the Wildcats broke the school record for wins. He remained at UK for 25 years, retiring from coaching in June 2003. Madison broke the record for most victories by a coach in Wildcat history with 737 wins. At the time, only Ron Polk and LSU's Skip Bertman had more wins in the SEC.

Madison coached 17 players who eventually played Major League Baseball, including 2006 Cy Young Award winner, Brandon Webb.

Madison is a member of three Halls of Fame: the Kentucky High School Baseball Coaches Association Hall of Fame, the University of Kentucky Athletic Hall of Fame and the American Baseball Coaches Association Hall of Fame. His jersey is retired at U.K. and in 2013 Madison was awarded the prestigious Lefty Gomez Award for his contributions to amateur baseball.

== Life after coaching ==
Since 2006, Madison has served with Christian mission organization, SCORE International, and has helped to lead hundreds of baseball players and coaches on dozens of short term baseball mission trips to the Dominican Republic.

Madison is also the publisher of baseball magazine, Inside Pitch. Inside Pitch is the official magazine of the American Baseball Coaches Association.
