= Nick Mingione =

American baseball coach (born 1978)

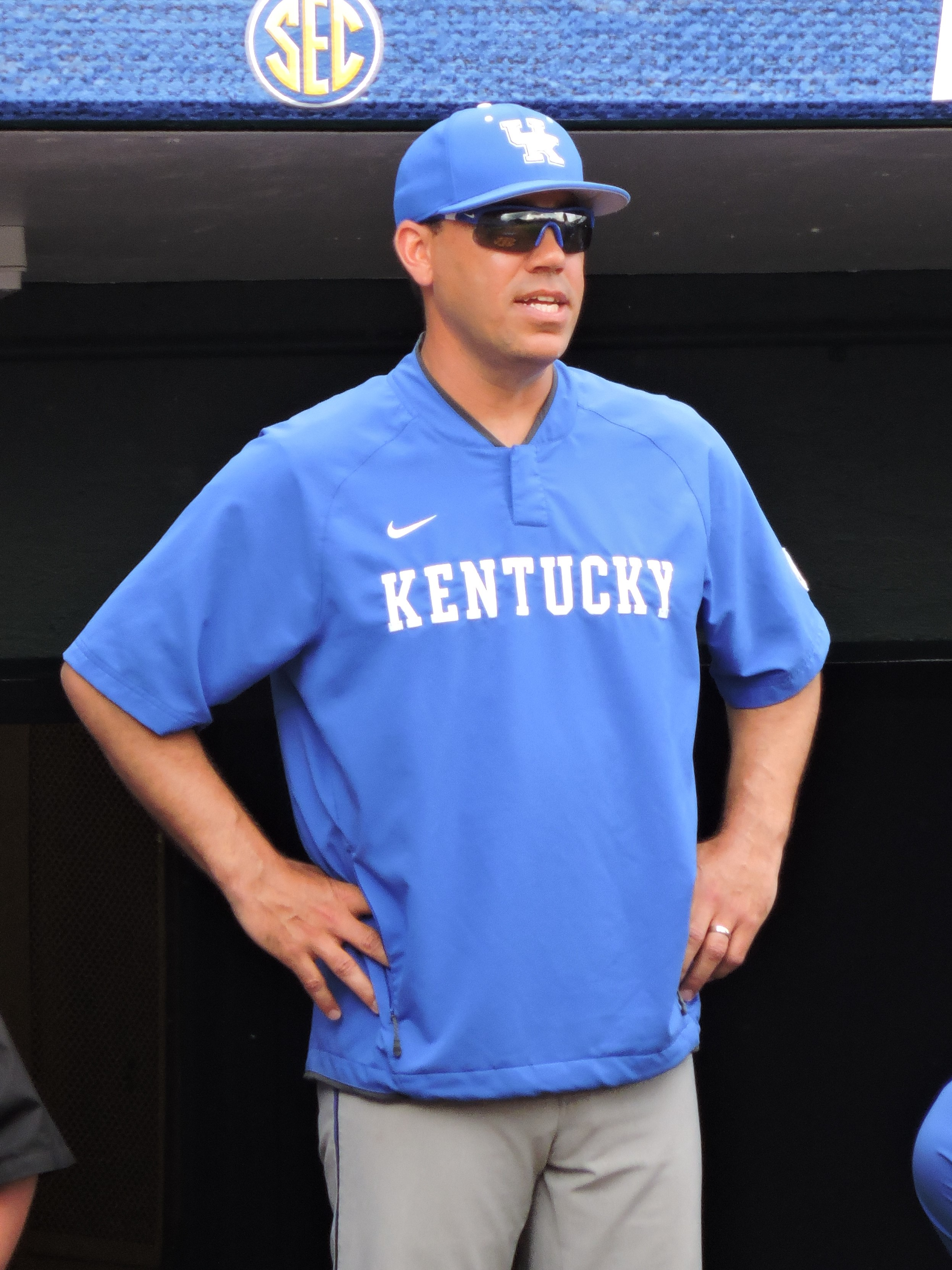
- Mingione as the Head Coach of the Kentucky Wildcats

Current position
- Title: Head coach
- Team: Kentucky
- Conference: SEC
- Record: 328–215 (.604)
- Annual salary: $1,435,000

Biographical details
- Born: September 10, 1978 (age 48); Tarrytown, New York, U.S.

Playing career
- 1997–2000: Embry–Riddle
- Position: Infielder

Coaching career (HC unless noted)
- 2002: Florida Gulf Coast (assistant)
- 2003–2005: Embry-Riddle (assistant)
- 2006–2007: Kentucky (assistant)
- 2008: Western Carolina (assistant)
- 2009–2016: Mississippi State (assistant)
- 2017–present: Kentucky

Head coaching record
- Overall: 328–215 (.604)
- Tournaments: SEC 5–11 (.313); NCAA 18–12 (.600)

Accomplishments and honors

Championships
- SEC Regular Season (2024)

Awards
- SEC Coach of the Year (2017, 2024); Perfect Game National Coach of the Year (2024); National Collegiate Baseball Writers Association Coach of the Year (2024); Dick Howser Award (2024)

Nick Mingione (born September 10, 1978) is an American college baseball coach and former infielder who is the current head coach for the Kentucky Wildcats. He played college baseball at Embry–Riddle Aeronautical University for coach Greg Guilliams from 1997 to 2000.

== Playing career ==
Mingione played his college career at Embry–Riddle Aeronautical University. He graduated from ERAU in 2000 with a degree in aerospace studies.

== Coaching career ==
=== Kentucky ===
After serving as an assistant college coach for 13 seasons, Mingione was named head coach of Kentucky for the 2017 season. In his first season as a head coach, he was named SEC Coach of the Year. He also led Kentucky to its first regional win and first super regional appearance in the program's history.

== Head coaching record ==
Record table
Season	Team	Overall	Conference	Standing	Postseason
Kentucky Wildcats (Southeastern Conference) (2017–present)
2017	Kentucky	43–23	19–11	2nd (East)	NCAA Super Regional
2018	Kentucky	34–22	13–17	5th (East)	
2019	Kentucky	28–29	7–23	7th (East)	
2020	Kentucky	11–6	0–0		Season canceled due to COVID-19
2021	Kentucky	29–23	12–18	6th (East)	
2022	Kentucky	33–26	12–18	6th (East)	
2023	Kentucky	40–21	16–14	4th (East)	NCAA Super Regional
2024	Kentucky	46–16	22–8	T–1st (East)	College World Series
2025	Kentucky	31–26	13–17	13th	NCAA Regional
2026	Kentucky	33–23	13–17	13th	NCAA Regional
Kentucky:		328–215 (.604)	127–143 (.470)		
Total:		328–215 (.604)			
National champion Postseason invitational champion Conference regular season champion Conference regular season and conference tournament champion Division regular season champion Division regular season and conference tournament champion Conference tournament champion
