= 2014 NCAA Division I baseball season =

Baseball season

- Duration: February 14, 2014 – June 25, 2014
- Number of teams: 302
- Preseason No. 1: Cal State Fullerton (CB, Coaches, NCBWA); Virginia (BA)

Tournament
- Duration: May 30 – June 25, 2014
- Most conference bids: SEC (10)

College World Series
- Champions: Vanderbilt (1st title)
- Runners-up: Virginia (3rd CWS Appearance)
- Winning coach: Tim Corbin (1st title)
- MOP: Dansby Swanson (Vanderbilt)

Seasons
- ← 2013 2015 →

The 2014 NCAA Division I baseball season, play of college baseball in the United States organized by the National Collegiate Athletic Association (NCAA) at the Division I level, began on February 14, 2014. The season progressed through the regular season, many conference tournaments and championship series, and concluded with the 2014 NCAA Division I baseball tournament and 2014 College World Series. The College World Series, consisting of the eight remaining teams in the NCAA tournament and held annually in Omaha, Nebraska, at TD Ameritrade Park Omaha, ended on June 25, 2014, with the final game of the best-of-three championship series between Vanderbilt and Virginia, won by Vanderbilt.

== Realignment ==
There were many significant conference changes that took effect prior to the season.

- Notre Dame and Pittsburgh departed the original Big East for the ACC, joining the Atlantic and Coastal Divisions respectively, and making that a 14-team conference for baseball (the other 2013 arrival in the ACC, Syracuse, does not sponsor baseball).
- The Big East split into two leagues:

- The legal successor, composed of Cincinnati, Connecticut, Louisville, Rutgers, and South Florida, along with Conference USA departures Houston, Memphis, Temple, and UCF, formed the American.
- Georgetown, Seton Hall, St. John's, and Villanova joined with Butler and Xavier from the Atlantic 10 and Creighton of the MVC to reform the Big East.

- The Great West Conference ceased operations after all but two baseball members secured a place in other conferences. Full member NJIT and baseball affiliate NYIT became Division I Independents.
- George Mason moved from the CAA to the Atlantic 10.
- College of Charleston moved from the Southern Conference to the CAA.
- Conference USA replaced its departing members with Florida Atlantic, FIU, Middle Tennessee, and North Texas of the Sun Belt, Louisiana Tech and UTSA of the WAC, Old Dominion from the CAA and Charlotte from the Atlantic 10.
- Oakland moved from The Summit League to the Horizon League.
- The MAAC added Quinnipiac and Monmouth, both formerly of the NEC.
- San Jose State moved from the WAC to the Mountain West.
- Dallas Baptist shifted its baseball-only membership in the WAC to the MVC.
- New Orleans joined the Southland after previously playing as an Independent. Houston Baptist departed the Great West to join the Southland.
- The Sun Belt added former WAC members Texas State and Texas–Arlington, plus Georgia State from the CAA.
- Former Great West full members Utah Valley, Chicago State, Texas–Pan American, as well as associate members North Dakota and Northern Colorado, joined the WAC.
- Pacific rejoined the West Coast Conference, a league in which it was a charter member. The Tigers departed the Big West Conference, now a nine-team league.

This was also the final season for several teams in their then-current leagues:

- Maryland would leave the ACC for the Big Ten.
- Louisville and Rutgers would spend only the 2014 season in The American; they respectively left for the ACC and Big Ten.
- A third team from The American, Temple, announced that it would drop the sport after the season.
- East Carolina and Tulane would leave C-USA for The American.
- Western Kentucky would leave the Sun Belt for C-USA
- Appalachian State, Davidson, Georgia Southern, and Elon would all leave the Southern Conference (SoCon). Appalachian State and Georgia Southern joined the Sun Belt, Davidson the Atlantic 10, and Elon the CAA.
- East Tennessee State and Mercer would leave the Atlantic Sun for the SoCon. ETSU returned to the SoCon after a nine-year absence.
- VMI would leave the Big South and return to the SoCon after an 11-year absence.
- Oral Roberts would return to The Summit League after two seasons in the Southland.

=== Reclassifications from Division II ===
- UMass Lowell joined the America East.
- Abilene Christian and Incarnate Word joined the Southland.
- Grand Canyon joined the WAC.

== Eligibility investigations ==
The Philadelphia Phillies selected college juniors Ben Wetzler of Oregon State University in the fifth round and Jason Monda of the University of Washington in the sixth round of the 2013 Major League Baseball draft. Both entered into negotiations with the Phillies with the help of a financial adviser, which is against National Collegiate Athletic Association rules, but is "something that reportedly happens all the time". Both also chose to return to college for their senior year. The Phillies reported Wetzler and Monda to the NCAA, which cleared Monda and suspended Wetzler for the first 11 games, which is 20%, of the college season.

== Season outlook ==
Collegiate Baseball News
Ranking	Team
1	Cal State Fullerton
2	Mississippi State
3	LSU
4	Oregon State
5	Florida State
6	Oregon
7	Indiana
8	Louisville
9	Vanderbilt
10	NC State
11	North Carolina
12	Virginia
13	Miami (FL)
14	South Carolina
15	UCLA
16	Florida
17	Rice
18	Oklahoma State
19	TCU
20	Texas
21	Clemson
22	Arizona State
23	Louisiana–Lafayette
24	Arizona
25	Texas A&M

Baseball America
Ranking	Team
1	Virginia
2	Oregon State
3	Indiana
4	Cal State Fullerton
5	NC State
6	Florida State
7	South Carolina
8	Mississippi State
9	LSU
10	Vanderbilt
11	Oregon
12	UCLA
13	Clemson
14	Louisiana–Lafayette
15	Rice
16	Miami (FL)
17	North Carolina
18	Texas
19	TCU
20	Louisville
21	Alabama
22	Kansas State
23	Florida
24	Texas A&M
25	Arkansas

Coaches
Ranking	Team
1	Cal State Fullerton 18
2	LSU 6
3	Oregon State
4	Mississippi State 4
5	Florida State
6	Virginia
7	Oregon
8	Vanderbilt
9	NC State
10	UCLA
11	Indiana
12	North Carolina
13	Louisville
14	South Carolina
15	Rice
16	Clemson
17	Miami (FL)
18	Oklahoma State
19	Arizona State
20	Florida
21	Kansas State
22	Texas
23	TCU
24	Louisiana–Lafayette
25	Stanford

NCBWA
Ranking	Team
1	Cal State Fullerton
2	Virginia
3	Oregon State
4	Mississippi State
5	Florida State
6	LSU
7	Indiana
8	NC State
9	UCLA
10	Vanderbilt
11	Oregon
12	South Carolina
13	North Carolina
14	Louisville
15	Rice
16	Clemson
17	Miami (FL)
18	Kansas State
19	Oklahoma State
20	Arizona State
21	Florida
22	TCU
23	Texas A&M
24	Louisiana–Lafayette
25	Texas

== Conference standings ==
2014 America East Conference baseball standings
	Conf.				Overall
Team	W		L	PCT	W		L	PCT
Stony Brook ‍†‍‍	18	–	5	.783	35	–	18	.660
Hartford ‍‍‍	16	–	7	.696	31	–	23	.574
UMass Lowell ‍‍‍	10	–	10	.500	20	–	22	.476
Binghamton ‍‍‡‍^{y}	11	–	12	.478	25	–	26	.490
Maine ‍‍‍	10	–	11	.476	24	–	29	.453
UMBC ‍‍‍	7	–	17	.292	17	–	29	.370
Albany ‍‍‍	7	–	17	.292	12	–	33	.267
† – Conference champion ‡ – Tournament champion y – Invited to the NCAA tournament As of June 6, 2014; Rankings from Collegiate Baseball

2014 American Athletic Conference baseball standings
	Conf.				Overall
Team	W		L	PCT	W		L	PCT
No. 7 Louisville ‍†‍‍^{y}	19	–	5	.792	50	–	17	.746
UCF ‍‍‍	17	–	7	.708	36	–	23	.610
No. 11 Houston ‍‍‡‍^{y}	14	–	9	.609	48	–	18	.727
Rutgers ‍‍‍	14	–	9	.609	30	–	25	.545
South Florida ‍‍‍	10	–	14	.417	27	–	31	.466
Temple ‍‍‍	9	–	14	.391	15	–	32	.319
Connecticut ‍‍‍	9	–	14	.391	27	–	31	.466
Memphis ‍‍‍	8	–	16	.333	30	–	29	.508
Cincinnati ‍‍‍	6	–	18	.250	22	–	31	.415
† – Conference champion ‡ – Tournament champion y – Invited to the NCAA tournament As of June 26, 2014; Rankings from Collegiate Baseball

2014 Atlantic 10 Conference baseball standings
	Conf.						Overall
Team	W		L		T	PCT	W		L		T	PCT
Saint Louis ‍†‍‍	18	–	7	–	1	.712	34	–	21	–	1	.616
Saint Joseph's ‍‍‍	18	–	8	–	0	.692	35	–	16	–	0	.686
George Mason ‍‍‡‍^{y}	16	–	9	–	0	.640	34	–	22	–	0	.607
VCU ‍‍‍	15	–	10	–	0	.600	37	–	20	–	0	.649
Richmond ‍‍‍	13	–	12	–	0	.520	24	–	28	–	1	.462
Dayton ‍‍‍	14	–	13	–	0	.519	24	–	30	–	0	.444
Fordham ‍‍‍	13	–	14	–	0	.481	24	–	30	–	0	.444
George Washington ‍‍‍	12	–	15	–	0	.444	20	–	30	–	0	.400
UMass ‍‍‍	12	–	15	–	0	.444	15	–	31	–	0	.326
La Salle ‍‍‍	9	–	15	–	1	.380	14	–	34	–	1	.296
Rhode Island ‍‍‍	7	–	18	–	0	.280	13	–	40	–	0	.245
St. Bonaventure ‍‍‍	6	–	17	–	0	.261	12	–	30	–	0	.286
† – Conference champion ‡ – Tournament champion y – Invited to the NCAA tournament As of June 7, 2014; Rankings from Collegiate Baseball

2014 Atlantic Coast Conference baseball standings
	Conf.						Overall
Team	W		L		T	PCT	W		L		T	PCT
Atlantic
No. 21 Florida State ^{x}‍‍‍^{y}	21	–	9	–	0	.700	43	–	17	–	0	.717
No. 16 Maryland ‍‍‍^{y}	15	–	14	–	0	.517	40	–	23	–	0	.635
Clemson ‍‍‍^{y}	15	–	14	–	0	.517	36	–	25	–	0	.590
Wake Forest ‍‍‍	15	–	15	–	0	.500	30	–	26	–	0	.536
NC State ‍‍‍	13	–	17	–	0	.433	32	–	23	–	0	.582
Boston College ‍‍‍	10	–	20	–	0	.333	22	–	33	–	0	.400
Notre Dame ‍‍‍	9	–	21	–	0	.300	22	–	31	–	0	.415
Coastal
No. 22 Miami (FL) ^{x}‍‍‍^{y}	24	–	6	–	0	.800	44	–	19	–	0	.698
No. 2 Virginia ‍‍‍^{y}	22	–	8	–	0	.733	47	–	14	–	0	.770
Duke ‍‍‍	16	–	14	–	0	.533	33	–	25	–	0	.569
North Carolina ‍‍‍^{y}	15	–	15	–	0	.500	35	–	27	–	0	.565
Georgia Tech ‍‍‡‍^{y}	14	–	16	–	0	.467	37	–	27	–	0	.578
Pittsburgh ‍‍‍	11	–	19	–	0	.367	22	–	30	–	0	.423
Virginia Tech ‍‍‍	9	–	21	–	0	.300	21	–	31	–	1	.406
x – Division champion ‡ – Tournament champion y – Invited to the NCAA tournament As of January 16, 2015; Rankings from Collegiate Baseball

2014 Atlantic Sun Conference baseball standings
	Conf.				Overall
Team	W		L	PCT	W		L	PCT
Florida Gulf Coast ‍†‍‍	19	–	8	.704	39	–	22	.639
Mercer ‍‍‍	18	–	9	.667	38	–	17	.691
No. 13 Kennesaw State ‍‍‡‍^{y}	17	–	9	.654	40	–	24	.625
Lipscomb ‍‍‍	17	–	10	.630	33	–	28	.541
East Tennessee State ‍‍‍	13	–	13	.500	27	–	30	.474
Jacksonville ‍‍‍	13	–	13	.500	21	–	33	.389
Stetson ‍‍‍	13	–	14	.481	26	–	34	.433
North Florida ‍‍‍	11	–	16	.407	22	–	31	.415
USC Upstate ‍‍‍	6	–	20	.231	17	–	38	.309
Northern Kentucky ‍‍‍	6	–	21	.222	14	–	37	.275
† – Conference champion ‡ – Tournament champion y – Invited to the NCAA tournament As of June 8, 2014; Rankings from Collegiate Baseball

2014 Big 12 Conference baseball standings
	Conf.				Overall
Team	W		L	PCT	W		L	PCT
No. 10 Oklahoma State ‍†‍‍^{y}	18	–	6	.750	48	–	18	.727
No. 5 TCU ‍‍‡‍^{y}	17	–	7	.708	48	–	18	.727
Kansas ‍‍‍^{y}	15	–	9	.625	35	–	26	.574
No. 8 Texas Tech ‍‍‍^{y}	14	–	10	.583	45	–	21	.682
No. 3 Texas ‍‍‍^{y}	13	–	11	.542	46	–	21	.687
West Virginia ‍‍‍	9	–	14	.391	28	–	26	.519
Baylor ‍‍‍	8	–	15	.348	26	–	31	.456
Oklahoma ‍‍‍	8	–	16	.333	29	–	29	.500
Kansas State ‍‍‍	5	–	19	.208	25	–	30	.455
† – Conference champion ‡ – Tournament champion y – Invited to the NCAA tournament Rankings from Collegiate Baseball

2014 Big East Conference baseball standings
	Conf.						Overall
Team	W		L		T	PCT	W		L		T	PCT
No. 30 Creighton ‍†‍‍	14	–	4	–	0	.778	32	–	17	–	1	.650
St. John's ‍‍‍	13	–	5	–	0	.722	35	–	20	–	0	.636
Seton Hall ‍‍‍	11	–	7	–	0	.611	38	–	15	–	0	.717
Xavier ‍‍‡‍^{y}	8	–	10	–	0	.444	30	–	29	–	0	.508
Butler ‍‍‍	7	–	11	–	0	.389	20	–	30	–	0	.400
Georgetown ‍‍‍	5	–	13	–	0	.278	19	–	29	–	0	.396
Villanova ‍‍‍	5	–	13	–	0	.278	16	–	34	–	0	.320
† – Conference champion ‡ – Tournament champion y – Invited to the NCAA tournament As of June 2, 2014; Rankings from Collegiate Baseball

2014 Big South Conference baseball standings
	Conf.						Overall
Team	W		L		T	PCT	W		L		T	PCT
North
Liberty ^{x}‍‍‍^{y}	23	–	3	–	0	.885	41	–	18	–	0	.695
Campbell ‍‍‡‍^{y}	18	–	8	–	0	.692	41	–	21	–	0	.661
High Point ‍‍‍	18	–	8	–	0	.692	33	–	22	–	0	.600
Radford ‍‍‍	17	–	10	–	0	.630	33	–	23	–	0	.589
VMI ‍‍‍	11	–	16	–	0	.407	25	–	23	–	0	.521
Longwood ‍‍‍	9	–	18	–	0	.333	22	–	33	–	0	.400
South
Winthrop ^{x}‍‍‍	14	–	13	–	0	.519	27	–	33	–	0	.450
Coastal Carolina ‍‍‍	13	–	13	–	0	.500	24	–	33	–	0	.421
Charleston Southern ‍‍‍	12	–	14	–	0	.462	30	–	26	–	0	.536
Gardner–Webb ‍‍‍	11	–	15	–	0	.423	24	–	31	–	0	.436
Presbyterian ‍‍‍	9	–	18	–	0	.333	19	–	34	–	1	.361
UNC Asheville ‍‍‍	4	–	22	–	0	.154	13	–	40	–	0	.245
x – Division champion ‡ – Tournament champion y – Invited to the NCAA tournament As of June 1, 2014; Rankings from Collegiate Baseball

2014 Big Ten Conference baseball standings
	Conf.						Overall
Team	W		L		T	PCT	W		L		T	PCT
No. 8 Indiana ‍†‍‡‍^{y}	21	–	3	–	0	.875	44	–	15	–	0	.746
No. 26 Nebraska ‍‍‍^{y}	18	–	6	–	0	.750	41	–	21	–	0	.661
Illinois ‍‍‍	17	–	7	–	0	.708	32	–	21	–	0	.604
Minnesota ‍‍‍	13	–	11	–	0	.542	27	–	24	–	0	.529
Michigan ‍‍‍	13	–	11	–	0	.542	30	–	29	–	1	.508
Michigan State ‍‍‍	11	–	13	–	0	.458	31	–	26	–	0	.544
Iowa ‍‍‍	10	–	14	–	0	.417	30	–	23	–	0	.566
Ohio State ‍‍‍	10	–	14	–	0	.417	30	–	28	–	0	.517
Northwestern ‍‍‍	7	–	16	–	0	.304	19	–	33	–	0	.365
Purdue ‍‍‍	6	–	18	–	0	.250	13	–	37	–	0	.260
Penn State ‍‍‍	5	–	18	–	0	.217	18	–	32	–	0	.360
† – Conference champion ‡ – Tournament champion y – Invited to the NCAA tournament Rankings from Coaches' Poll

2014 Big West Conference baseball standings
	Conf.						Overall
Team	W		L		T	PCT	W		L		T	PCT
No. 19 Cal Poly ‍†‍‍^{y}	19	–	5	–	0	.792	48	–	11	–	0	.814
Long Beach State ‍‍‍^{y}	17	–	7	–	0	.708	34	–	26	–	0	.567
No. 6 UC Irvine ‍‍‍^{y}	15	–	9	–	0	.625	41	–	25	–	0	.621
No. 29 Cal State Fullerton ^{y} ‍‍‍	14	–	10	–	0	.583	34	–	24	–	0	.586
UC Santa Barbara ‍‍‍	12	–	12	–	0	.500	34	–	17	–	1	.663
UC Riverside ‍‍‍	12	–	12	–	0	.500	26	–	28	–	0	.481
UC Davis ‍‍‍	7	–	17	–	0	.292	23	–	31	–	0	.426
Hawaii ‍‍‍	6	–	18	–	0	.250	22	–	31	–	0	.415
Cal State Northridge ‍‍‍	6	–	18	–	0	.250	18	–	38	–	0	.321
† – Conference champion y – Invited to the NCAA tournament Rankings from Collegiate Baseball

2014 Colonial Athletic Association baseball standings
	Conf.				Overall
Team	W		L	PCT	W		L	PCT
William & Mary ‍†‍‍	15	–	5	.750	34	–	22	.607
No. 16 College of Charleston ‍‍‡‍^{y}	15	–	6	.714	44	–	19	.698
UNC Wilmington ‍‍‍	10	–	9	.526	30	–	27	.526
Delaware ‍‍‍	10	–	10	.500	26	–	27	.491
Northeastern ‍‍‍	9	–	12	.429	26	–	29	.473
James Madison ‍‍‍	8	–	12	.400	17	–	36	.321
Hofstra ‍‍‍	7	–	11	.389	20	–	24	.455
Towson ‍‍‍	4	–	13	.235	22	–	25	.468
† – Conference champion ‡ – Tournament champion y – Invited to the NCAA tournament As of June 30, 2014; Rankings from Collegiate Baseball

2014 Conference USA baseball standings
	Conf.						Overall
Team	W		L		T	PCT	W		L		T	PCT
No. 26 Rice ‍†‍‡‍^{y}	23	–	7	–	0	.767	42	–	20	–	0	.677
UAB ‍‍‍	20	–	10	–	0	.667	35	–	21	–	0	.625
Southern Miss ‍‍‍	19	–	11	–	0	.633	35	–	25	–	0	.583
Middle Tennessee ‍‍‍	17	–	13	–	0	.567	31	–	27	–	0	.534
Old Dominion ‍‍‍^{y}	17	–	13	–	0	.567	36	–	26	–	0	.581
East Carolina ‍‍‍	16	–	14	–	0	.533	33	–	26	–	0	.559
UTSA ‍‍‍	16	–	14	–	0	.533	35	–	26	–	0	.574
FIU ‍‍‍	16	–	14	–	0	.533	36	–	20	–	0	.643
Florida Atlantic ‍‍‍	14	–	16	–	0	.467	28	–	25	–	0	.528
Tulane ‍‍‍	10	–	18	–	0	.357	23	–	29	–	0	.442
Marshall ‍‍‍	10	–	19	–	0	.345	20	–	31	–	0	.392
Charlotte ‍‍‍	10	–	19	–	0	.345	19	–	31	–	1	.382
Louisiana Tech ‍‍‍	5	–	25	–	0	.167	15	–	35	–	0	.300
† – Conference champion ‡ – Tournament champion y – Invited to the NCAA tournament Rankings from Collegiate Baseball

2014 Horizon League baseball standings
	Conf.				Overall
Team	W		L	PCT	W		L	PCT
Wright State ‍†‍‍	25	–	4	.862	35	–	22	.614
UIC ‍‍‍	17	–	13	.567	24	–	27	.471
Valparaiso ‍‍‍	12	–	12	.500	25	–	28	.472
Milwaukee ‍‍‍	10	–	14	.417	21	–	29	.420
Oakland ‍‍‍	7	–	17	.292	12	–	33	.267
Youngstown State ‍‍‡‍^{y}	6	–	17	.261	17	–	38	.309
† – Conference champion ‡ – Tournament champion y – Invited to the NCAA tournament Rankings from Collegiate Baseball

2014 Ivy League baseball standings
	Conf.				Overall
Team	W		L	PCT	W		L	PCT
Lou Gehrig
Columbia ^{x}‍‍‡‍^{y}	15	–	5	.750	29	–	20	.592
Penn ^{x}‍‍‍	15	–	5	.750	24	–	17	.585
Cornell ‍‍‍	9	–	11	.450	18	–	21	.462
Princeton ‍‍‍	8	–	12	.400	14	–	26	.350
Red Rolfe
Dartmouth ^{x}‍‍‍	11	–	9	.550	18	–	21	.462
Yale ^{x}‍‍‍	11	–	9	.550	19	–	22	.463
Brown ‍‍‍	6	–	14	.300	13	–	24	.351
Harvard ‍‍‍	5	–	15	.250	11	–	28	.282
x – Division champion ‡ – Championship Series champion y – Invited to the NCAA tournament Rankings from Collegiate Baseball

2014 Metro Atlantic Athletic Conference baseball standings
	Conf.				Overall
Team	W		L	PCT	W		L	PCT
Canisius ‍†‍‍	20	–	4	.833	40	–	16	.714
Siena ‍‍‡‍^{y}	17	–	7	.708	27	–	33	.450
Fairfield ‍‍‍	15	–	8	.652	32	–	24	.571
Monmouth ‍‍‍	12	–	10	.545	24	–	25	.490
Quinnipiac ‍‍‍	12	–	10	.545	18	–	31	.367
Manhattan ‍‍‍	11	–	13	.458	17	–	33	.340
Marist ‍‍‍	10	–	14	.417	17	–	32	.347
Iona ‍‍‍	9	–	15	.375	13	–	31	.295
Niagara ‍‍‍	8	–	14	.364	20	–	31	.392
Rider ‍‍‍	7	–	15	.318	16	–	33	.327
Saint Peter's ‍‍‍	6	–	17	.261	11	–	41	.212
† – Conference champion ‡ – Tournament champion y – Invited to the NCAA tournament Rankings from Collegiate Baseball

2014 Mid-American Conference baseball standings
	Conf.						Overall
Team	W		L		T	PCT	W		L		T	PCT
East Division
Miami (OH) ^{x}‍‍‍	18	–	9	–	0	.667	30	–	27	–	0	.526
Kent State ‍‍‡‍^{y}	16	–	11	–	0	.593	36	–	21	–	0	.632
Bowling Green ‍‍‍	15	–	12	–	0	.556	25	–	27	–	0	.481
Buffalo ‍‍‍	13	–	13	–	0	.500	26	–	26	–	0	.500
Akron ‍‍‍	12	–	15	–	0	.444	28	–	29	–	0	.491
Ohio ‍‍‍	7	–	20	–	0	.259	11	–	40	–	0	.216
West Division
Ball State ^{x}‍‍‍	22	–	4	–	0	.846	39	–	18	–	0	.684
Central Michigan ‍‍‍	19	–	8	–	0	.704	36	–	23	–	0	.610
Western Michigan ‍‍‍	11	–	16	–	0	.407	24	–	31	–	0	.436
Toledo ‍‍‍	11	–	16	–	0	.407	21	–	32	–	0	.396
Northern Illinois ‍‍‍	11	–	16	–	0	.407	17	–	35	–	1	.330
Eastern Michigan ‍‍‍	6	–	21	–	0	.222	19	–	34	–	0	.358
x – Division champion ‡ – Tournament champion y – Invited to the NCAA tournament Rankings from Collegiate Baseball

2014 Mid-Eastern Athletic Conference baseball standings
	Conf.						Overall
Team	W		L		T	PCT	W		L		T	PCT
Northern
Delaware State ^{x}‍‍‍	17	–	7	–	0	.708	30	–	17	–	0	.638
Norfolk State ‍‍‍	14	–	10	–	0	.583	23	–	26	–	0	.469
Coppin State ‍‍‍	9	–	15	–	0	.375	12	–	34	–	0	.261
Maryland Eastern Shore ‍‍‍	8	–	16	–	0	.333	13	–	35	–	0	.271
Southern
Florida A&M ^{x}‍‍‍	14	–	10	–	0	.583	26	–	26	–	0	.500
Bethune–Cookman ^{x}‍‍‡‍^{y}	14	–	10	–	0	.583	27	–	33	–	0	.450
North Carolina Central ‍‍‍	12	–	12	–	0	.500	19	–	32	–	1	.375
Savannah State ‍‍‍	11	–	13	–	0	.458	22	–	31	–	0	.415
North Carolina A&T ‍‍‍	9	–	15	–	0	.375	17	–	31	–	0	.354
x – Division champion ‡ – Tournament champion y – Invited to the NCAA tournament Rankings from Collegiate Baseball

2014 Missouri Valley Conference baseball standings
	Conf.				Overall
Team	W		L	PCT	W		L	PCT
Evansville ‍†‍‍	15	–	6	.714	34	–	21	.618
Indiana State ‍‍‍	14	–	7	.667	35	–	18	.660
Dallas Baptist ‍‍‡‍^{y}	14	–	7	.667	39	–	21	.650
Wichita State ‍‍‍	13	–	8	.619	31	–	28	.525
Illinois State ‍‍‍	10	–	11	.476	33	–	22	.600
Missouri State ‍‍‍	9	–	12	.429	26	–	31	.456
Bradley ‍‍‍	5	–	16	.238	24	–	27	.471
Southern Illinois ‍‍‍	4	–	17	.190	26	–	31	.456
† – Conference champion ‡ – Tournament champion y – Invited to the NCAA tournament As of May 24, 2014; Rankings from Collegiate Baseball

2014 Mountain West Conference baseball standings
	Conf.						Overall
Team	W		L		T	PCT	W		L		T	PCT
UNLV ‍†‍‍^{y}	20	–	10	–	0	.667	36	–	25	–	0	.590
New Mexico ‍†‍‍	20	–	10	–	0	.667	37	–	20	–	1	.647
San Diego State ‍‍‡‍^{y}	17	–	13	–	0	.567	42	–	21	–	0	.667
Nevada ‍‍‍	15	–	15	–	0	.500	31	–	27	–	0	.534
Fresno State ‍‍‍	13	–	17	–	0	.433	28	–	29	–	0	.491
Air Force ‍‍‍	10	–	20	–	0	.333	20	–	34	–	0	.370
San Jose State ‍‍‍	10	–	20	–	0	.333	19	–	38	–	0	.333
† – Conference champion ‡ – Tournament champion y – Invited to the NCAA Division I Baseball Championship; As of June 1, 2014; Rankings from Collegiate Baseball

2014 Northeast Conference baseball standings
	Conf.						Overall
Team	W		L		T	PCT	W		L		T	PCT
Bryant ‍†‍‡‍^{y}	19	–	5	–	0	.792	42	–	16	–	0	.724
Central Connecticut ‍‍‍	14	–	10	–	0	.583	27	–	22	–	0	.551
Sacred Heart ‍‍‍	13	–	11	–	0	.542	29	–	28	–	0	.509
LIU Brooklyn ‍‍‍	11	–	13	–	0	.458	25	–	25	–	1	.500
Wagner ‍‍‍	11	–	13	–	0	.458	19	–	35	–	0	.352
Mount St. Mary's ‍‍‍	10	–	14	–	0	.417	17	–	24	–	0	.415
Fairleigh Dickinson ‍‍‍	6	–	18	–	0	.250	15	–	32	–	0	.319
† – Conference champion ‡ – Tournament champion y – Invited to the NCAA tournament Rankings from Collegiate Baseball

2014 Pac-12 Conference baseball standings
	Conf.						Overall
Team	W		L		T	PCT	W		L		T	PCT
No. 17 Oregon State ‍†‍‍^{y}	23	–	7	–	0	.767	45	–	14	–	0	.763
No. 22 Washington ‍‍‍^{y}	21	–	9	–	0	.700	41	–	17	–	1	.703
Arizona State ‍‍‍^{y}	19	–	11	–	0	.633	33	–	24	–	0	.579
No. 27 Oregon ‍‍‍^{y}	18	–	12	–	0	.600	44	–	20	–	0	.688
No. 15 Stanford ‍‍‍^{y}	16	–	14	–	0	.533	35	–	26	–	0	.574
Southern California ‍‍‍	16	–	14	–	0	.533	29	–	24	–	0	.547
Washington State ‍‍‍	14	–	16	–	0	.467	24	–	30	–	0	.444
California ‍‍‍	13	–	17	–	0	.433	26	–	27	–	0	.491
UCLA ‍‍‍	12	–	18	–	0	.400	25	–	30	–	1	.455
Arizona ‍‍‍	9	–	21	–	0	.300	22	–	33	–	0	.400
Utah ‍‍‍	4	–	26	–	0	.133	16	–	36	–	0	.308
† – Conference champion y – Invited to the NCAA tournament Rankings from Collegiate Baseball

2014 Southeastern Conference baseball standings
	Conf.						Overall
Team	W		L		T	PCT	W		L		T	PCT
Eastern
No. 24 Florida ^{x}‍†‍‍^{y}	21	–	9	–	0	.700	40	–	23	–	0	.635
No. 25 South Carolina ‍‍‍^{y}	18	–	12	–	0	.600	44	–	18	–	0	.710
No. 1 Vanderbilt ‍‍‍^{y}	17	–	13	–	0	.567	51	–	21	–	0	.708
Kentucky ‍‍‍^{y}	14	–	16	–	0	.467	37	–	25	–	0	.597
Tennessee ‍‍‍	12	–	18	–	0	.400	31	–	23	–	0	.574
Georgia ‍‍‍	11	–	18	–	1	.383	26	–	29	–	1	.473
Missouri ‍‍‍	6	–	24	–	0	.200	20	–	33	–	0	.377
Western
No. 4 Ole Miss ^{x}‍‍‍^{y}	19	–	11	–	0	.633	48	–	21	–	0	.696
No. 21 LSU ‍‍‡‍^{y}	17	–	11	–	1	.603	46	–	16	–	1	.738
No. 28 Mississippi State ‍‍‍^{y}	18	–	12	–	0	.600	39	–	24	–	0	.619
No. 30 Arkansas ‍‍‍^{y}	16	–	14	–	0	.533	40	–	25	–	0	.615
Alabama ‍‍‍^{y}	15	–	14	–	0	.517	37	–	24	–	0	.607
Texas A&M ‍‍‍^{y}	14	–	16	–	0	.467	36	–	26	–	0	.581
Auburn ‍‍‍	10	–	20	–	0	.333	28	–	28	–	0	.500
x – Division champion † – Conference champion ‡ – Tournament champion y – Invited to the NCAA tournament Rankings from Collegiate Baseball

2014 Southern Conference baseball standings
	Conf.				Overall
Team	W		L	PCT	W		L	PCT
Western Carolina ‍†‍‍	20	–	6	.769	37	–	18	.673
Davidson ‍‍‍	17	–	8	.680	29	–	19	.604
Georgia Southern ‍‍‡‍^{y}	15	–	12	.556	40	–	23	.635
Samford ‍‍‍	15	–	12	.556	35	–	25	.583
Wofford ‍‍‍	12	–	14	.462	32	–	28	.533
Appalachian State ‍‍‍	12	–	14	.462	21	–	34	.382
Elon ‍‍‍	12	–	15	.444	27	–	26	.509
Furman ‍‍‍	11	–	15	.423	26	–	32	.448
UNC Greensboro ‍‍‍	8	–	16	.333	21	–	28	.429
The Citadel ‍‍‍	8	–	18	.308	24	–	34	.414
† – Conference champion ‡ – Tournament champion y – Invited to the NCAA tournament As of June 30, 2014; Rankings from Collegiate Baseball

2014 Southland Conference baseball standings
	Conf.				Overall
Team	W		L	PCT	W		L	PCT
Sam Houston State ‍†‍‍^{y}	22	–	8	.733	43	–	19	.694
Nicholls State ‍‍‍	21	–	9	.700	32	–	26	.552
Northwestern State ‍‍‍	19	–	11	.633	33	–	26	.559
Texas A&M–Corpus Christi ‍‍‍	19	–	11	.633	31	–	27	.534
Southeastern Louisiana ‍‍‡‍^{y}	18	–	12	.600	38	–	25	.603
Central Arkansas ‍‍‍	17	–	13	.567	32	–	22	.593
McNeese State ‍‍‍	17	–	13	.567	30	–	28	.517
Lamar ‍‍‍	16	–	14	.533	31	–	25	.554
Oral Roberts ‍‍‍	15	–	15	.500	30	–	26	.536
Houston Baptist ‍‍‍	12	–	18	.400	23	–	28	.451
Incarnate Word* ‍‍‍	9	–	15	.375	18	–	32	.360
Stephen F. Austin ‍‍‍	11	–	19	.367	20	–	35	.364
Abilene Christian* ‍‍‍	6	–	18	.250	18	–	36	.333
New Orleans ‍‍‍	2	–	28	.067	11	–	38	.224
† – Conference champion ‡ – Tournament champion y – Invited to the NCAA tournament Rankings from Collegiate Baseball; *Ineligible for postseason play due to Division I transition

2014 Southwestern Athletic Conference baseball standings
	Conf.				Overall
Team	W		L	PCT	W		L	PCT
East
Alabama State ^{x}‍‍‍	21	–	3	.875	37	–	20	.649
Alabama A&M ‍‍‍	12	–	9	.571	21	–	32	.396
Alcorn State ‍‍‍	10	–	12	.455	11	–	42	.208
Jackson State ‍‍‡‍^{y}	9	–	15	.375	32	–	25	.561
Mississippi Valley State ‍‍‍	4	–	18	.182	4	–	38	.095
West
Arkansas–Pine Bluff ^{x}‍‍‍	16	–	7	.696	22	–	28	.440
Texas Southern ‍‍‍	13	–	9	.591	23	–	29	.442
Prairie View A&M ‍‍‍	11	–	12	.478	21	–	30	.412
Grambling State ‍‍‍	11	–	13	.458	16	–	32	.333
Southern ‍‍‍	6	–	16	.273	10	–	26	.278
x – Division champion ‡ – Tournament champion y – Invited to the NCAA tournament Rankings from Collegiate Baseball

2014 Sun Belt Conference baseball standings
	Conf.				Overall
Team	W		L	PCT	W		L	PCT
No. 9 Louisiana–Lafayette ‍†‍‡‍^{y}	26	–	4	.867	58	–	10	.853
Texas–Arlington ‍‍‍	19	–	11	.633	32	–	26	.552
Arkansas State ‍‍‍	18	–	12	.600	32	–	26	.552
Texas State ‍‍‍	16	–	14	.533	30	–	28	.517
WKU ‍‍‍	15	–	15	.500	29	–	28	.509
Troy ‍‍‍	11	–	18	.379	25	–	32	.439
South Alabama ‍‍‍	11	–	18	.379	22	–	33	.400
Arkansas–Little Rock ‍‍‍	11	–	19	.367	25	–	29	.463
Georgia State ‍‍‍	11	–	19	.367	25	–	31	.446
Louisiana–Monroe ‍‍‍	11	–	19	.367	23	–	36	.390
† – Conference champion ‡ – Tournament champion y – Invited to the NCAA tournament As of June 30, 2014; Rankings from Collegiate Baseball

2014 West Coast Conference baseball standings
	Conf.				Overall
Team	W		L	PCT	W		L	PCT
No. 12 Pepperdine ‍†‍‡‍^{y}	18	–	9	.667	43	–	18	.705
Loyola Marymount ‍‍‍	17	–	10	.630	32	–	24	.571
Gonzaga ‍‍‍	17	–	10	.630	26	–	29	.473
Santa Clara ‍‍‍	16	–	11	.593	26	–	30	.464
San Diego ‍‍‍	16	–	11	.593	34	–	20	.630
Pacific ‍‍‍	15	–	12	.556	26	–	26	.500
BYU ‍‍‍	12	–	15	.444	22	–	31	.415
San Francisco ‍‍‍	11	–	16	.407	25	–	28	.472
Saint Mary's ‍‍‍	8	–	19	.296	16	–	38	.296
Portland ‍‍‍	5	–	22	.185	11	–	41	.212
† – Conference champion ‡ – Tournament champion y – Invited to the NCAA tournament Rankings from Collegiate Baseball

2014 Western Athletic Conference baseball standings
	Conf.				Overall
Team	W		L	PCT	W		L	PCT
Sacramento State ‍†‍‡‍^{y}	21	–	6	.778	40	–	24	.625
Grand Canyon ‍‍‍	19	–	8	.704	30	–	23	.566
Texas–Pan American ‍‍‍	17	–	10	.630	27	–	30	.474
Utah Valley ‍‍‍	16	–	11	.593	28	–	30	.483
Cal State Bakersfield ‍‍‍	15	–	12	.556	26	–	33	.441
Seattle ‍‍‍	13	–	11	.542	26	–	27	.491
New Mexico State ‍‍‍	11	–	13	.458	23	–	31	.426
North Dakota ‍‍‍	8	–	16	.333	10	–	29	.256
Chicago State ‍‍‍	5	–	19	.208	17	–	37	.315
Northern Colorado ‍‍‍	4	–	23	.148	10	–	43	.189
† – Conference champion ‡ – Tournament champion y – Invited to the NCAA tournament Rankings from Collegiate Baseball

=== Conference winners and tournaments ===
Twenty-nine athletic conferences each end their regular seasons with a single-elimination tournament or a double-elimination tournament. The teams in each conference that win their regular season title are given the number one seed in each tournament. The winners of these tournaments receive automatic invitations to the 2014 NCAA Division I baseball tournament.

Conference	Regular Season Winner	Conference Player of the Year	Conference Coach of the Year	Conference Tournament	Tournament Venue (City)	Tournament Winner
America East Conference	Stony Brook	Kevin Krause, Stony Brook	Matt Senk, Stony Brook	2014 America East Conference baseball tournament	Edward A. LeLacheur Park • Lowell, MA	Binghamton
American Athletic Conference	Louisville	Jeff Gardner, Louisville	Terry Rooney, UCF	2014 American Athletic Conference baseball tournament	Bright House Field • Clearwater, FL	Houston
Atlantic 10 Conference	Saint Louis	Collin Forgey, Saint Joseph's	Fritz Hamburg, Saint Joseph's	2014 Atlantic 10 Conference baseball tournament	Billiken Sports Center • St. Louis, MO	George Mason
Atlantic Coast Conference	Atlantic - Florida State; Coastal - Miami (FL)	D. J. Stewart, Florida State	Brian O'Connor, Virginia	2014 Atlantic Coast Conference baseball tournament	NewBridge Bank Park • Greensboro, NC	Georgia Tech
Atlantic Sun Conference	Florida Gulf Coast	Max Pentecost, Kennesaw State	Dave Tollett, Florida Gulf Coast	2014 Atlantic Sun Conference baseball tournament	Swanson Stadium • Fort Myers, FL	Kennesaw State
Big 12 Conference	Oklahoma State	Zach Fish, Oklahoma State	Josh Holliday, Oklahoma State	2014 Big 12 Conference baseball tournament	Chickasaw Bricktown Ballpark • Oklahoma City, OK	TCU
Big East Conference	Creighton	Reagan Fowler, Creighton and D. J. Ruhlman, Seton Hall	Ed Servais, Creighton	2014 Big East Conference baseball tournament	MCU Park • Brooklyn, NY	Xavier
Big South Conference	North - Liberty; South - Winthrop	Ryan Seiz, Liberty	Jim Toman, Liberty	2014 Big South Conference baseball tournament	Winthrop Ballpark • Rock Hill, SC	Campbell
Big Ten Conference	Indiana	Sam Travis, Indiana	Tracy Smith, Indiana	2014 Big Ten Conference baseball tournament	TD Ameritrade Park Omaha • Omaha, NE	Indiana
Big West Conference	Cal Poly	Mark Mathias, Cal Poly	Larry Lee, Cal Poly	No tournament, regular season champion earns auto bid		
Colonial Athletic Association	William & Mary	Michael Katz, William & Mary	Brian Murphy, William & Mary	2014 Colonial Athletic Association baseball tournament	Brooks Field • Wilmington, NC	College of Charleston
Conference USA	Rice	Aramis Garcia, Florida International	Brian Shoop, UAB	2014 Conference USA baseball tournament	Pete Taylor Park • Hattiesburg, MS	Rice
Horizon League	Wright State	Ryan Solberg, Milwaukee	Greg Lovelady, Wright State	2014 Horizon League baseball tournament	Kapco Park • Milwaukee, WI	Youngstown State
Ivy League	Gehrig - Penn/Columbia; Rolfe - Yale/Dartmouth	Alec Keller, Princeton	—N/a	2014 Ivy League Baseball Championship Series	Campus Sites	Columbia
Metro Atlantic Athletic Conference	Canisius	Connor Panas, Canisius	Mike McRae, Canisius	2014 Metro Atlantic Athletic Conference baseball tournament	FirstEnergy Park • Lakewood, NJ	Siena
Mid-American Conference	East - Miami (OH); West - Ball State	Sean Godfrey, Ball State	Rich Maloney, Ball State	2014 Mid-American Conference baseball tournament	All Pro Freight Stadium • Avon, OH	Kent State
Mid-Eastern Athletic Conference	Northern - Delaware State; Southern - Bethune-Cookman/Florida A&M	Bennie Robinson, Florida A&M	Jamey Shouppe, Florida A&M	2014 Mid–Eastern Athletic Conference baseball tournament	Marty L. Miller Field • Norfolk, VA	Bethune-Cookman
Missouri Valley Conference	Evansville	Casey Gillaspie, Wichita State	Wes Carroll, Evansville	2014 Missouri Valley Conference baseball tournament	Bob Warn Field at Sycamore Stadium • Terre Haute, IN	Dallas Baptist
Mountain West Conference	UNLV/New Mexico	Jordan Luplow, Fresno State	Tim Chambers, UNLV	2014 Mountain West Conference baseball tournament	Earl E. Wilson Stadium • Paradise, NV	San Diego State
Northeast Conference	Bryant	John Ziznewski, LIU Brooklyn	Steve Owens, Bryant	2014 Northeast Conference baseball tournament	Dodd Stadium • Norwich, CT	Bryant
Ohio Valley Conference	Southeast Missouri State	Matt Tellor, Southeast Missouri State	Steve Bieser, Southeast Missouri State	2014 Ohio Valley Conference baseball tournament	The Ballpark at Jackson • Jackson, TN	Jacksonville State
Pac-12 Conference	Oregon State	Michael Conforto, Oregon State	Lindsay Meggs, Washington	No tournament, regular season champion earns auto bid		
Patriot League	Bucknell/Army	Kash Manzelli, Navy	Scott Heather, Bucknell	2014 Patriot League baseball tournament	Campus Sites	Bucknell
Southeastern Conference	East – Florida; West – Mississippi	A. J. Reed, Kentucky	Kevin O'Sullivan, Florida	2014 Southeastern Conference baseball tournament	Hoover Metropolitan Stadium • Hoover, AL	LSU
Southern Conference	Western Carolina	Forrest Brandt, Davidson & Casey Jones, Elon	Dick Cooke, Davidson	2014 Southern Conference baseball tournament	Joseph P. Riley Jr. Park • Charleston, SC	Georgia Southern
Southland Conference	Sam Houston State	Anthony Azar, Sam Houston State	Seth Thibodeaux, Nicholls	2014 Southland Conference baseball tournament	Bear Stadium • Conway, AR	Southeastern Louisiana
Southwestern Athletic Conference	East - Alabama State; West - Arkansas–Pine Bluff	Emmanuel Marrero, Alabama State	Mervyl Melendez, Alabama State	2014 Southwestern Athletic Conference baseball tournament	Wesley Barrow Stadium • New Orleans, LA	Jackson State
The Summit League	Omaha	Tim Colwell, North Dakota State	Bob Herold, Omaha	2014 Summit League baseball tournament	Erv Huether Field • Brookings, SD	North Dakota State
Sun Belt Conference	Louisiana-Lafayette	Jace Conrad, Louisiana-Lafayette	Tony Robichaux, Louisiana-Lafayette	2014 Sun Belt Conference baseball tournament	Eddie Stanky Field • Mobile, AL	Louisiana-Lafayette
West Coast Conference	Pepperdine	Connor Joe, San Diego	Steve Rodriguez, Pepperdine	2014 West Coast Conference baseball tournament	Banner Island Ballpark • Stockton, CA	Pepperdine
Western Athletic Conference	Sacramento State	Rhys Hoskins, Sacramento State	Reggie Christiansen, Sacramento State	2014 Western Athletic Conference baseball tournament	Cubs Park • Mesa, AZ	Sacramento State

== College World Series ==
The 2014 season marked the sixty eighth NCAA baseball tournament, which culminated with the eight team College World Series. The College World Series was held in Omaha, Nebraska. The eight teams played a double-elimination format, with Commodores claiming their first championship with a two games to one series win over Virginia in the final.

=== Bracket ===
First round
UC Irvine	3
Texas	1
Louisville	3
Vanderbilt	5
Texas	4
Louisville	1
Texas Tech	2
7	TCU	3
Ole Miss	1
3	Virginia	2
Texas Tech	1
Ole Miss	2

Second round
UC Irvine	4
Vanderbilt	6
Texas	1
UC Irvine	0
7	TCU	2
3	Virginia	3^{15}
Ole Miss	6
7	TCU	4

Semifinals
Vanderbilt	0	4
Texas	4	3^{10}
3	Virginia	4	–
Ole Miss	1	–

Final
Vanderbilt	9	2	3
3	Virginia	8	7	2

== Award winners ==
=== Major player of the year awards ===
- Dick Howser Trophy: A. J. Reed, Kentucky
- Baseball America: A. J. Reed, Kentucky
- Collegiate Baseball/Louisville Slugger: A. J. Reed, Kentucky
- American Baseball Coaches Association: A. J. Reed, Kentucky
- Golden Spikes Award: A. J. Reed, Kentucky

=== Major freshman of the year awards ===
- Baseball America Freshman Of The Year: Zach Collins, Miami
- Collegiate Baseball Freshman Player of the Year: Jake Noll, Florida Gulf Coast
- Collegiate Baseball Freshman Pitcher of the Year: Zach Plesac, Ball State

=== Major coach of the year awards ===
- American Baseball Coaches Association: Tim Corbin, Vanderbilt
- Baseball America: Tim Corbin, Vanderbilt
- Collegiate Baseball Coach of the Year: Tim Corbin, Vanderbilt
- National Collegiate Baseball Writers Association (NCBWA) National Coach of the Year: Mike Gillespie, UC Irvine
- ABCA/Baseball America Assistant Coach of the Year: Butch Thompson, Mississippi State

=== Other major awards ===
- Senior CLASS Award (baseball) (outstanding Senior of the Year in baseball): Andrew Morales, UC Irvine
- Johnny Bench Award (Catcher of the Year): Max Pentecost, Kennesaw State
- Brooks Wallace Award (Shortstop of the Year): Trea Turner, NC State
- John Olerud Award (best two-way player): A. J. Reed, Kentucky
- American Baseball Coaches Association Gold Glove:

== Coaching changes ==
This table lists programs that changed head coaches at any point from the first day of the 2014 season until the day before the first day of the 2015 season.

Team	Former coach	Interim coach	New coach	Reason
Arizona State	Tim Esmay		Tracy Smith	Esmay resigned on June 9, 2014.
Brown	Marek Drabinski		Grant Achilles	Drabinski resigned on April 11, 2014. The Bears were 6–15, 0–8 in the Ivy League and coming off a loss to Connecticut.
Campbell	Greg Goff		Justin Haire	Goff resigned to take the coaching position at Louisiana Tech.
Illinois State	Mark Kingston		Bo Durkac	Kingston resigned on June 4 to take the coaching position at South Florida
Indiana	Tracy Smith		Chris Lemonis	Smith resigned on June 9 to take the coaching position at Arizona State.
Louisiana Tech	Wade Simoneaux		Greg Goff	Simoneaux was fired on May 19 at the end of a 15–35 season, finishing last in C-USA.
Mississippi Valley State	Doug Shanks		Aaron Stevens	Shanks retired November 12.
New Mexico State	Rocky Ward		Brian Green	Ward was fired on May 27 at the end of a 23 - 31 season, finishing 7th in the WAC.
Northern Illinois	Ed Mathey		Mike Kunigonis	Mathey resigned on November 20 to take over at Division III North Central College.
Rhode Island	Jim Foster		Raphael Cerrato	Foster resigned to take an assistant coaching job with Boston College on July 17, 2014. Cerrato was originally announced as interim head coach on July 17, 2014, interim tag lifted on June 23, 2015.
Rutgers	Fred Hill		Joe Litterio	Hill announced on February 20, 2014, that he would retire.
Sam Houston State	David Pierce		Matt Deggs	Pierce resigned to take the coaching position at Tulane.
San Diego State	Tony Gwynn		Mark Martinez	Gwynn died of cancer on June 16. The San Diego Padres Hall of Famer and San Diego State alumnus had gone on medical leave in March 2014 for treatment.
South Florida	Lelo Prado		Mark Kingston	Prado accepted a non-coaching position in the South Florida Athletic Department on May 19, 2014.
Tulane	Rick Jones		David Pierce	Jones retired on May 24 after 21 years of coaching the Green Wave.
VMI	Marlin Ikenberry		Jonathan Hadra	Ikenberry resigned November 3 to pursue a private sector opportunity. Hadra was initially named interim head coach, and announced as permanent head coach on November 13.

== See also ==
- 2014 NCAA Division I baseball rankings
- 2014 NCAA Division I baseball tournament
