= 2014 Louisville Cardinals baseball team =

American college baseball season

2014 Louisville Cardinals baseball

College World Series, 0–2
- Conference: American Athletic Conference

Ranking
- Coaches: No. 6
- CB: No. 7
- Record: 50–17 (19–5 The American)
- Head coach: Dan McDonnell (8th season)
- Assistant coaches: Chris Lemonis (8th season); Roger Williams (8th season); Kyle Cheesebrough (3rd season)
- Home stadium: Jim Patterson Stadium

2014 American Athletic Conference baseball standings
	Conf.				Overall
Team	W		L	PCT	W		L	PCT
No. 7 Louisville ‍†‍‍^{y}	19	–	5	.792	50	–	17	.746
UCF ‍‍‍	17	–	7	.708	36	–	23	.610
No. 11 Houston ‍‍‡‍^{y}	14	–	9	.609	48	–	18	.727
Rutgers ‍‍‍	14	–	9	.609	30	–	25	.545
South Florida ‍‍‍	10	–	14	.417	27	–	31	.466
Temple ‍‍‍	9	–	14	.391	15	–	32	.319
Connecticut ‍‍‍	9	–	14	.391	27	–	31	.466
Memphis ‍‍‍	8	–	16	.333	30	–	29	.508
Cincinnati ‍‍‍	6	–	18	.250	22	–	31	.415
† – Conference champion ‡ – Tournament champion y – Invited to the NCAA tournament As of June 26, 2014; Rankings from Collegiate Baseball

The 2014 Louisville Cardinals baseball team represented the University of Louisville in the 2014 NCAA Division I baseball season. The Cardinals were coached by Dan McDonnell, in his eighth season, and played their home games at Jim Patterson Stadium.

== Personnel ==
=== Roster ===
2014 Louisville Cardinals roster
Pitchers: 6 – Ryan Lauria – Freshman; 10 – Mason Richardson – Freshman; 13 – Josh Rogers – Freshman; 16 – Kyle Funkhouser – Sophomore; 19 – Nick Burdi – Junior; 20 – Drew Harrington – Freshman; 25 – Robert Strader – Freshman; 28 – Brandon Alphin – Junior; 31 – Joe Filomeno – Junior; 34 – Michael Bollmer – Freshman; 36 – Jonah Philley – Sophomore; 40 – Jared Ruxer – Junior; 43 – Zack Burdi – Freshman; 44 – Jake Sparger – Freshman; 45 – Kyle McGrath – Junior	Catchers: 14 – Kyle Gibson – Senior; 33 – Ryan Summers – Freshman; 38 – Aaron Gershenfeld – Junior; 41 – Shane Crain – Senior; Infielders: 1 – Sutton Whiting – Junior; 4 – Alex Chittenden – Senior; 5 – Anthony Kidston – Sophomore; 7 – Grant Kay – Junior; 8 – Danny Rosenbaum – Sophomore; 9 – Jordan Striegel – Freshman; 11 – Zach Lucas – Junior; 17 – Nick Solak – Freshman; 26 – Blake Tiberi – Freshman	Outfielders: 2 – Corey Ray – Freshman; 15 – Cole Sturgeon – Senior; 18 – Mike White – Junior; 24 – Logan Taylor – Freshman; 30 – Will Smith – Freshman; 35 – Colin Lyman – Freshman; 42 – Jeff Gardner – Senior

=== Coaches ===
2014 Louisville Cardinals baseball coaching staff
- 9 Dan McDonnell – Head coach
- 22 Chris Lemonis – Assistant coach/Recruiting coordinator
- 23 Roger Williams – Assistant coach/Pitching Coach
- 21 Kyle Cheesebrough – Assistant coach

== Schedule ==
2014 Louisville Cardinals baseball game log: 50–17
Regular season: 43–13

February: 7–2
Date	Opponent	Rank	Site/stadium	Score	Win	Loss	Save	Attendance	Overall record	AAC Record
Feb 14	vs. West Virginia	No. 8	Riley Park • Charleston, SC	W 7–6^{10}	Burdi (1–0)	Walter (0–1)	None	460	1–0	—
Feb 15	@ The Citadel	No. 8	Riley Park • Charleston, SC	L 3–5	Sherrill (1–0)	McGrath (0–1)	Hunter (1)	1,122	1–1	—
Feb 16	vs. Delaware	No. 8	Riley Park • Charleston, SC	W 6–1	Ruxer (1–0)	Hinkle (0–1)	None	392	2–1	—
Feb 19	Eastern Kentucky	No. 7	Jim Patterson Stadium • Louisville, KY	W 13–1	Burdi (2–0)	Lynch (0–1)	None	1,208	3–1	—
Feb 21	Western Michigan	No. 7	Jim Patterson Stadium • Louisville, KY	W 21–8	Philley (1–0)	Laudicina (0–1)	None	1,197	4–1	—
Feb 22	Western Michigan	No. 7	Jim Patterson Stadium • Louisville, KY	W 8–0	Funkhouser (1–0)	Mayle (0–2)	None	1,502	5–1	—
Feb 23	Western Michigan	No. 7	Jim Patterson Stadium • Louisville, KY	L 2–4	Berman (1–0)	Ruxer (1–1)	None	1,058	5–2	—
Feb 25	Eastern Illinois	No. 9	Jim Patterson Stadium • Louisville, KY	W 6–0	Sparger (1–0)	Haberer (0–1)	None	411	6–2	—
Feb 26	Morehead State	No. 9	Jim Patterson Stadium • Louisville, KY	Postponed						
Feb 28	Toledo	No. 9	Jim Patterson Stadium • Louisville, KY	W 6–2	Filomeno (1–0)	Wilkinson (0–1)	Strader (1)	628	7–2	—

March: 14–4
Date	Opponent	Rank	Site/stadium	Score	Win	Loss	Save	Attendance	Overall record	AAC Record
Mar 1	Indiana	No. 9	Jim Patterson Stadium • Louisville, KY	L 2–6	DeNato (3–0)	Funkhouser (1–1)	None	1,836	7–3	—
Mar 1	Toledo	No. 9	Jim Patterson Stadium • Louisville, KY	W 8–2	Ruxer (2–1)	Slack (0–2)	None	1,836	8–3	—
Mar 7	Miami (OH)	No. 10	Jim Patterson Stadium • Louisville, KY	L 4–6	Varner (2–1)	Filomeno (1–1)	McMartin (2)	1,205	8–4	—
Mar 8	Miami (OH)	No. 10	Jim Patterson Stadium • Louisville, KY	W 10–1	Funkhouser (2–1)	Williams (0–2)	None	1,160	9–4	—
Mar 9	Miami (OH)	No. 10	Jim Patterson Stadium • Louisville, KY	W 9–0	Ruxer (3–1)	Powers (1–2)	None	1,536	10–4	—
Mar 11	Western Illinois	No. 11	Jim Patterson Stadium • Louisville, KY	W 8–0	Kidston (1–0)	Church (0–1)	None	1,456	11–4	—
Mar 11	Western Illinois	No. 11	Jim Patterson Stadium • Louisville, KY	W 5–2	Sparger (2–0)	Cheesman (0–1)	Burdi (1)	1,456	12–4	—
Mar 14	Samford	No. 11	Jim Patterson Stadium • Louisville, KY	W 20–10	Funkhouser (3–1)	Ledford (3–1)	None	705	13–4	—
Mar 15	Samford	No. 11	Jim Patterson Stadium • Louisville, KY	W 18–2	Ruxer (4–1)	Milazzo (2–1)	None	1,756	14–4	—
Mar 15	Samford	No. 11	Jim Patterson Stadium • Louisville, KY	W 4–2	McGrath (1–1)	Brasher (0–1)	Burdi (2)	1,756	15–4	—
Mar 19	@ Indiana	No. 9	Bart Kaufman Field • Bloomington, IN	L 3–9	Sullivan (1–0)	Filomeno (1–2)	Belcher (1)	1,799	15–5	—
Mar 21	Rutgers	No. 9	Jim Patterson Stadium • Louisville, KY	W 6–1	Funkhouser (4–1)	Driscoll (1–2)	None	2,013	16–5	1–0
Mar 22	Rutgers	No. 9	Jim Patterson Stadium • Louisville, KY	W 9–8	Sturgeon (1–0)	Brey (2–1)	Burdi (3)	1,388	17–5	2–0
Mar 23	Rutgers	No. 9	Jim Patterson Stadium • Louisville, KY	L 2–11	Rosa (2–0)	Sparger (2–1)	None	914	17–6	2–1
Mar 26	@ Western Kentucky	No. 11	Nick Denes Field • Bowling Green, KY	W 5–3	Harrington (1–0)	Glasscock (0–1)	Burdi (4)	1,108	18–6	—
Mar 28	Xavier	No. 11	Jim Patterson Stadium • Louisville, KY	W 8–1	Funkhouser (5–1)	Hall (3–1)	None	1,197	19–6	—
Mar 29	Butler	No. 11	Jim Patterson Stadium • Louisville, KY	W 15–1	Ruxer (5–1)	Allen (3–3)	None	458	20–6	—
Mar 30	Xavier	No. 11	Jim Patterson Stadium • Louisville, KY	W 12–3	Kidston (2–0)	Nittoli (3–2)	None	1,379	21–6	—

April: 13–5
Date	Opponent	Rank	Site/stadium	Score	Win	Loss	Save	Attendance	Overall record	AAC Record
Apr 1	@ No. 21 Kentucky	No. 8	Cliff Hagan Stadium • Lexington, KY	L 3–8	Dwyer (2–1)	Rogers (0–1)	Jack (2)	3,742	21–7	—
Apr 4	Memphis	No. 8	Jim Patterson Stadium • Louisville, KY	W 5–4	Funkhouser (6–1)	Wallingford (4–2)	Burdi (5)	1,269	22–7	3–1
Apr 5	Memphis	No. 8	Jim Patterson Stadium • Louisville, KY	L 2–3	Reed (4–1)	Filomeno (1–3)	Beeler (7)	1,393	22–8	3–2
Apr 6	Memphis	No. 8	Jim Patterson Stadium • Louisville, KY	W 8–7^{12}	Burdi (2–0)	Beeler (2–1)	None	1,934	23–8	4–2
Apr 8	@ Purdue	No. 11	Alexander Field • West Lafayette, IN	W 3–1^{10}	Sturgeon (2–0)	Lutz (1–5)	None	664	24–8	—
Apr 11	@ No. 16 Houston	No. 11	Cougar Field • Houston, TX	W 4–2	Funkhouser (7–1)	Garza (6–3)	Burdi (6)	3,349	25–8	5–2
Apr 12	@ No. 16 Houston	No. 11	Cougar Field • Houston, TX	W 3–2	Ruxer (6–1)	Lemoine (5–2)	Burdi (7)	2,908	26–8	6–2
Apr 13	@ No. 16 Houston	No. 11	Cougar Field • Houston, TX	W 10–3	Kidston (3–0)	West (2–2)	None	1,283	27–8	7–2
Apr 15	Kentucky	No. 9	Jim Patterson Stadium • Louisville, KY	L 2–4	Salow (2–1)	Rogers (0–2)	Cody (3)	2,597	27–9	—
Apr 17	@ UCF	No. 9	Jay Bergman Field • Orlando, FL	L 2–8	Skoglund (6–1)	Funkhouser (7–2)	None		27–10	7–3
Apr 17	@ UCF	No. 9	Jay Bergman Field • Orlando, FL	L 3–4^{11}	Thompson (1–4)	Burdi (2–1)	None	1,342	27–11	7–4
Apr 18	@ UCF	No. 9	Jay Bergman Field • Orlando, FL	W 3–2	Kidston (4–0)	Meyer (3–1)	Burdi (8)	1,194	28–11	8–4
Apr 22	Western Kentucky	No. 23	Jim Patterson Stadium • Louisville, KY	W 3–1	Rogers (1–2)	Higgs (4–4)	Burdi (9)	2,604	29–11	—
Apr 23	Morehead State	No. 23	Jim Patterson Stadium • Louisville, KY	W 7–3	Lauria (1–0)	Schneider (2–3)	Sturgeon (1)	1,007	30–11	—
Apr 25	Connecticut	No. 23	Jim Patterson Stadium • Louisville, KY	W 2–0	Funkhouser (8–2)	Marzi (4–5)	Burdi (10)	2,246	31–11	9–4
Apr 26	Connecticut	No. 23	Jim Patterson Stadium • Louisville, KY	W 6–1	Ruxer (7–1)	Tabakman (3–1)	Harrington (1)	1,667	32–11	10–4
Apr 27	Connecticut	No. 23	Jim Patterson Stadium • Louisville, KY	W 8–2	Kidston (5–0)	Kay (3–4)	None	1,909	33–11	11–4
Apr 30	Ohio State	No. 19	Jim Patterson Stadium • Louisville, KY	W 7–3	Harrington (2–0)	Irving (0–1)	None	1,479	34–11	—

May: 9–2
Date	Opponent	Rank	Site/stadium	Score	Win	Loss	Save	Attendance	Overall record	AAC Record
May 3	@ South Florida	No. 19	USF Baseball Stadium • Tampa, FL	W 3–1	Funkhouser (9–2)	Mulholland (4–1)	Burdi (11)	312	35–11	12–4
May 3	@ South Florida	No. 19	USF Baseball Stadium • Tampa, FL	W 3–2^{11}	Sturgeon (3–0)	Pardo (1–1)	Burdi (12)	1,206	36–11	13–4
May 4	@ South Florida	No. 19	USF Baseball Stadium • Tampa, FL	W 9–5	Harrington (3–0)	Thomas (0–1)	Filomeno (1)	1,231	37–11	14–4
May 6	@ No. 17 Vanderbilt	No. 12	Hawkins Field • Nashville, TN	W 11–7	Alphin (1–0)	Buehler (8–2)	None	3,068	38–11	—
May 9	@ Temple	No. 12	Skip Wilson Field • Ambler, PA	W 2–0	Funkhouser (10–2)	Hockenberry (4–5)	Burdi (13)	312	39–11	15–4
May 10	@ Temple	No. 12	Campbell's Field • Camden, NJ	L 2–4	Vanderslice (1–3)	Alphin (1–1)	Krall (1)	328	39–12	15–5
May 11	@ Temple	No. 12	Campbell's Field • Camden, NJ	W 6–4^{11}	Burdi (3–1)	McCarthy (3–3)	None	312	40–12	16–5
May 13	No. 8 Indiana	No. 11	Jim Patterson Stadium • Louisville, KY	L 2–7	Harrison (5–0)	Harrington (3–1)	Kelzer (1)	2,433	40–13	—
May 15	Cincinnati	No. 11	Jim Patterson Stadium • Louisville, KY	W 5–1	Funkhouser (11–2)	Ring (2–3)	Burdi (14)	1,217	41–13	17–5
May 16	Cincinnati	No. 11	Jim Patterson Stadium • Louisville, KY	W 5–1	Rogers (2–2)	Walsh (5–8)	None	1,745	42–13	18–5
May 17	Cincinnati	No. 11	Jim Patterson Stadium • Louisville, KY	W 10–0^{7}	Kidston (6–0)	Zellner (4–4)	None	2,052	43–13	19–5

Postseason: 7–4

American Athletic Conference Tournament: 2–2
Date	Opponent	Seed/Rank	Site/stadium	Score	Win	Loss	Save	Attendance	Overall record	AACT Record
May 22	vs. (8) Memphis	(1) No. 10	Bright House Field • Clearwater, FL	W 13–3^{7}	Funkhouser (12–2)	Wallingford (6–5)	None		44–13	1–0
May 23	vs. (5) South Florida	(1) No. 10	Bright House Field • Clearwater, FL	L 1–2	Herget (8–6)	Rogers (2–3)	None		44–14	1–1
May 24	vs. (4) Rutgers	(1) No. 10	Bright House Field • Clearwater, FL	W 9–3	Kidston (7–0)	Rosa (6–3)	None		45–14	2–1
May 25	vs. (3) No. 19 Houston	(1) No. 10	Bright House Field • Clearwater, FL	L 4–10	Ford (8–0)	Harrington (3–2)	None	737	45–15	2–2

NCAA tournament Louisville Regional: 3–0
Date	Opponent	Seed/Rank	Site/stadium	Score	Win	Loss	Save	Attendance	Overall record	NCAAT record
May 30	(4) Kent State	(1) No. 12	Jim Patterson Stadium • Louisville, KY	W 5–0	Funkhouser (13–2)	Clark (6–7)	None	3,488	46–15	1–0
May 31	(3) Kansas	(1) No. 12	Jim Patterson Stadium • Louisville, KY	W 6–3	Kidston (8–0)	Duncan (8–0)	Burdi (15)	3,341	47–15	2–0
June 1	(2) No. 26 Kentucky	(1) No. 12	Jim Patterson Stadium • Louisville, KY	W 4–1	Rogers (3–3)	Salow (2–4)	Burdi (16)	4,319	48–15	3–0

NCAA tournament Louisville Super Regional: 2–0
Date	Opponent	Rank	Site/stadium	Score	Win	Loss	Save	Attendance	Overall record	NCAAT record
June 6	No. 12 Kennesaw State	No. 5	Jim Patterson Stadium • Louisville, KY	W 5–3	McGrath (2–1)	Connell (7–4)	Burdi (17)	5,351	49–15	4–0
June 7	No. 12 Kennesaw State	No. 5	Jim Patterson Stadium • Louisville, KY	W 7–4	Kidston (9–0)	Bergen (9–5)	Burdi (18)	6,007	50–15	5–0

College World Series: 0–2
Date	Opponent	Rank	Site/stadium	Score	Win	Loss	Save	Attendance	Overall record	CWS record
June 14	No. 5 Vanderbilt	No. 3	TD Ameritrade Park • Omaha, NE	L 3–5	Fulmer (7–1)	Funkhouser (13–3)	Ravenelle (1)	23,625	50–17	0–1
June 16	No. 6 Texas	No. 3	TD Ameritrade Park • Omaha, NE	L 1–4	French (7–5)	Kidston (9–1)	Duke (1)	17,612	50–17	0–2

== Ranking movements ==
Ranking movements Legend: ██ Increase in ranking ██ Decrease in ranking
	Week																		
Poll	Pre	1	2	3	4	5	6	7	8	9	10	11	12	13	14	15	16	17	Final
Coaches'	13	13*		13	11	9	13	8	11	9	17	8	7	6	7	9			
Baseball America	20	20	20	19	17	14	14	11	13	10	13	13	10	10	12	13			
Collegiate Baseball^	8	7	9	10	11	9	11	8	11	9	23	19	12	11	10	12	5	3	
NCBWA†	14	13	12	10	10	7	10	8	10	9	13	8	5	5	5	8	4		

^ Collegiate Baseball ranked 40 teams in their preseason poll, but only ranked 30 teams weekly during the season.
† NCBWA ranks 30 teams in their preseason poll, but only ranks 25 teams weekly during the season.
* A new poll was not released for this week, so for comparison purposes, the previous week's ranking is inserted in this week's slot.
