= 2014 American Athletic Conference baseball tournament =

American college baseball tournament

- Tournament Logo
- Teams: 8
- Format: Round-robin tournament
- Finals site: Bright House Field; Clearwater, FL
- Champions: Houston (1st title)
- Winning coach: Todd Whitting (1st title)
- MVP: Josh Vidales (Houston)
- Television: ESPNU (Championship game)

2014 American Athletic Conference baseball standings
| | Conf. | | | | Overall |
| Team | W | | L | PCT | W | | L | PCT |
|---|---|---|---|---|---|---|---|---|
| No. 7 Louisville ‍†‍‍^{y} | 19 | – | 5 | .792 | 50 | – | 17 | .746 |
| UCF ‍‍‍ | 17 | – | 7 | .708 | 36 | – | 23 | .610 |
| No. 11 Houston ‍‍‡‍^{y} | 14 | – | 9 | .609 | 48 | – | 18 | .727 |
| Rutgers ‍‍‍ | 14 | – | 9 | .609 | 30 | – | 25 | .545 |
| South Florida ‍‍‍ | 10 | – | 14 | .417 | 27 | – | 31 | .466 |
| Temple ‍‍‍ | 9 | – | 14 | .391 | 15 | – | 32 | .319 |
| Connecticut ‍‍‍ | 9 | – | 14 | .391 | 27 | – | 31 | .466 |
| Memphis ‍‍‍ | 8 | – | 16 | .333 | 30 | – | 29 | .508 |
| Cincinnati ‍‍‍ | 6 | – | 18 | .250 | 22 | – | 31 | .415 |
† – Conference champion ‡ – Tournament champion y – Invited to the NCAA tournament As of June 26, 2014; Rankings from Collegiate Baseball

The 2014 American Athletic Conference baseball tournament was held at Bright House Field in Clearwater, Florida, from May 21 through 25. The event, held at the end of the conference regular season, determined the champion of the American Athletic Conference for the 2014 season. Houston won the round-robin tournament and received the conference's automatic bid to the 2014 NCAA Division I baseball tournament.

== Format and seeding ==
The top eight finishers from the regular season were seeded one through eight. The tournament used a round-robin format, with the field divided into two groups. The winners of each group, Louisville and Houston, faced off in a single championship game. With nine teams in the league, the last-place regular season finisher, Cincinnati, was not in the field.

| Team | W | L | Pct. | GB | Seed |
|---|---|---|---|---|---|
| Louisville | 19 | 5 | .792 | – | 1 |
| UCF | 17 | 7 | .708 | 2 | 2 |
| Houston | 14 | 9 | .609 | 4.5 | 3 |
| Rutgers | 14 | 9 | .609 | 4.5 | 4 |
| South Florida | 10 | 14 | .417 | 9 | 5 |
| Temple | 9 | 14 | .391 | 9.5 | 6 |
| Connecticut | 9 | 14 | .391 | 9.5 | 7 |
| Memphis | 8 | 16 | .333 | 11 | 8 |
| Cincinnati | 6 | 18 | .250 | 13 | – |

== Bracket ==
| | Division A | UL | RU | USF | Mem | Overall |
| 1 | Louisville | | W 9–3 | L 1–2 | W 13–3 | 2–1 |
| 4 | Rutgers | L 3–9 | | W 10–0 | L 1–5 | 1–2 |
| 5 | South Florida | W 2–1 | L 0–10 | | L 1–2 | 1–2 |
| 8 | Memphis | L 3–13 | W 5–1 | W 2–1 | | 2–1 |

| | Division B | UCF | Hou | Tem | UConn | Overall |
| 2 | UCF | | L 8–13 | W 6–2 | W 7–1 | 2–1 |
| 3 | Houston | W 13–8 | | W 3–0 | L 2–7 | 2–1 |
| 6 | Temple | L 2–6 | L 0–3 | | W 9–4 | 1–2 |
| 7 | Connecticut | L 1–7 | W 7–2 | L 4–9 | | 1–2 |

| Finals |
| A | Louisville | 4 |
| B | Houston | 10 |

== All-Tournament Team ==
The following players were named to the All-Tournament Team.

| Pos | Name | School |
|---|---|---|
| P | Andrew Lantrip | Houston |
| P | Jimmy Herget | USF |
| C | Kyle Gibson | Louisville |
| C | Keaton Aldridge | Memphis |
| IF | James Vasquez | UCF |
| IF | Casey Grayson | Houston |
| IF | Josh Vidales | Houston |
| IF | Kyle Teaf | USF |
| OF | Jeff Gardner | Louisville |
| OF | Kyle Survance | Houston |
| OF | Vinny Zarrillo | Rutgers |
| DH | Nick Solak | Louisville |

=== Most Outstanding Player ===
Josh Vidales was named Tournament Most Outstanding Player. Vidales was a second baseman for Houston.
