= 2014 Delaware State Hornets baseball team =

American college baseball season

2014 Delaware State Hornets baseball

MEAC Northern Division Champions
- Conference: Mid-Eastern Athletic Conference
- Record: 30-17 (17-7 MEAC)
- Head coach: J. P. Blandin (14th Year)
- Assistant coaches: Chris Barker (1st Year); Tom Riley; Scott Davis

2014 Mid-Eastern Athletic Conference baseball standings
	Conf.						Overall
Team	W		L		T	PCT	W		L		T	PCT
Northern
Delaware State ^{x}‍‍‍	17	–	7	–	0	.708	30	–	17	–	0	.638
Norfolk State ‍‍‍	14	–	10	–	0	.583	23	–	26	–	0	.469
Coppin State ‍‍‍	9	–	15	–	0	.375	12	–	34	–	0	.261
Maryland Eastern Shore ‍‍‍	8	–	16	–	0	.333	13	–	35	–	0	.271
Southern
Florida A&M ^{x}‍‍‍	14	–	10	–	0	.583	26	–	26	–	0	.500
Bethune–Cookman ^{x}‍‍‡‍^{y}	14	–	10	–	0	.583	27	–	33	–	0	.450
North Carolina Central ‍‍‍	12	–	12	–	0	.500	19	–	32	–	1	.375
Savannah State ‍‍‍	11	–	13	–	0	.458	22	–	31	–	0	.415
North Carolina A&T ‍‍‍	9	–	15	–	0	.375	17	–	31	–	0	.354
x – Division champion ‡ – Tournament champion y – Invited to the NCAA tournament Rankings from Collegiate Baseball

The 2014 Delaware State Hornets baseball team represented Delaware State University in the sport of baseball during the 2014 college baseball season. The Hornets competed in NCAA Division I and the Eastern Division of the Mid-Eastern Athletic Conference (MEAC). The team is coached by J. P. Blandin, who entered his fourteenth season at Delaware State. The Hornets looked to build upon their appearance in the 2013 MEAC baseball tournament, where they were eliminated after losing after two straight games in the tournament, the first to North Carolina A&T and then Bethune–Cookman.

== Departures ==
Position	Name	Reason for departure
LHP	Zach Adkins	Graduated
OF	Nick Arrue	Unknown
RHP	Tommy Dill	Unknown
INF	JP Frey	Graduated
RHP	Elliott Gardner	Graduated
OF	Kevin Guthrie	Unknown
C	Eddie Sorondo	Graduated
C	Chad Sturgeon	Graduated
RHP	Derek Marshallsea	Graduated
RHP	Jordan Elliott	Graduated; Signed to Washington Wild Things

== Roster ==
2014 Delaware State Hornets baseball team
Players
Coaches

#	Pos.	Name	B/T	Height	Weight	Year	Home town
9	C	Jacob Bartlett	R/R	5 ft 11 in (1.8 m)	185 lb (84 kg)	Fr	Wilmington, Delaware
15	OF	Justin Allen	L/L	6 ft 0 in (1.83 m)	175 lb (79 kg)	RS Jr	Laurel, Delaware
21	OF	Charles Dailey	R/R	5 ft 11 in (1.8 m)	190 lb (86 kg)	RS Jr	Pasadena, Maryland
20	OF	Bobby Brown	R/R	5 ft 8 in (1.73 m)	150 lb (68 kg)	Jr	Dover, Delaware
40	RHP	Zach Candeloro	R/R	6 ft 4 in (1.93 m)	220 lb (100 kg)	Jr	Dover, Delaware
5	INF	Cameron Cecil	R/R	5 ft 9 in (1.75 m)	180 lb (82 kg)	Sr	Gloucester
13	INF	Ryan Haas	L/L	6 ft 0 in (1.83 m)	200 lb (91 kg)	Sr	Bear, Delaware
23	RHP	Matt McClain	R/R	6 ft 2 in (1.88 m)	180 lb (82 kg)	Sr	Dover, Delaware
8	INF	DJ Miller	R/R	6 ft 0 in (1.83 m)	170 lb (77 kg)	Sr	Wilmington, Delaware
30	OF	Aaron Nardone	L/R	6 ft 0 in (1.83 m)	185 lb (84 kg)	Sr	Chesapeake, Virginia
35	C	Mike Alexander	R/R	5 ft 10 in (1.78 m)	180 lb (82 kg)	Sr	New Castle, Delaware
24	OF	Hassan Evans	R/R	6 ft 3 in (1.91 m)	210 lb (95 kg)	Sr	Brooklyn, New York
2	RHP	George Michael	R/R	5 ft 10 in (1.78 m)	160 lb (73 kg)	So	Milford, Delaware
28	INF	Mitchell Moore	R/R	6 ft 0 in (1.83 m)	195 lb (88 kg)	So	Dover, Delaware
14	INF	Cameron Onderko	R/R	5 ft 9 in (1.75 m)	165 lb (75 kg)	So	McKeesport, Pennsylvania
12	INF	Chris Rivera	R/R	5 ft 6 in (1.68 m)	150 lb (68 kg)	So	Lincoln, Delaware
25	OF	Ronald Farley	R/R	6 ft 0 in (1.83 m)	200 lb (91 kg)	Fr	Cockeysville, Maryland
11	LHP	Dan Galati	L/L	5 ft 11 in (1.8 m)	170 lb (77 kg)	Fr	Wilmington, Delaware
27	RHP	Christopher Gonzales	R/R	5 ft 11 in (1.8 m)	190 lb (86 kg)	Fr	Canóvanas, Puerto Rico
19	RHP	Kyle Mace	R/R	6 ft 3 in (1.91 m)	185 lb (84 kg)	Fr	Dover, Delaware
34	OF	Ryan Mordecai	R/R	6 ft 3 in (1.91 m)	190 lb (86 kg)	Fr	Holmes, New York
7	INF	Richard Rodriguez	S/R	5 ft 8 in (1.73 m)	170 lb (77 kg)	Fr	Brooklyn, New York
16	RHP	Eric Sharff	R/R	6 ft 3 in (1.91 m)	225 lb (102 kg)	Fr	Georgetown, Delaware
1	INF	Kwestin Smith	S/R	5 ft 8 in (1.73 m)	170 lb (77 kg)	Fr	Teaneck, New Jersey
48	RHP	Harry Thomas	R/R	6 ft 4 in (1.93 m)	230 lb (104 kg)	Fr	Washington, D.C.
18	OF	Tyler Williams	L/L	5 ft 10 in (1.78 m)	175 lb (79 kg)	Fr	Wilmington, Delaware
17	LHP	Jaylen Zielecki	L/L	6 ft 0 in (1.83 m)	185 lb (84 kg)	Fr	Stafford, Virginia
10	INF	David Kimbrough	R/R	6 ft 1 in (1.85 m)	165 lb (75 kg)	Jr	Atlanta
26	RHP	Kenneth Thomas	R/R	6 ft 2 in (1.88 m)	190 lb (86 kg)	Jr	New Castle, Delaware

Head coach

J. P. Blandin

Assistant coach(es)

Chris Barker

Legend

- (C) Team captain
- (S) Suspended
- (I) Ineligible
- Injured
- Current redshirt

Roster
Last update: March 3, 2014

== Schedule ==
2014 Delaware State Hornets baseball game log
Regular Season

Date	Opponent	Rank	Site/stadium	Score	Win	Loss	Save	Attendance	Overall record	MEAC record
February 22	Iona		Dover, Delaware	5–6	Brucker (1–0)	Candeloro (0–1)		81	0–1	
February 22	Bucknell		Dover, Delaware	1–0	Sharff (1–0)	Bryson (0–2)		69	1–1	
February 23	Iona		Dover, Delaware	8–7	Sharff (2–0)	Pucillo		62	2–1	
February 26	George Washington		Washington, D.C.	Postponed						
February 27	George Washington		Washington, D.C.	7–5	Gonzalez (1–0)	Milon (0–1)	Sharff (1)	34	3–1	
March 1	Akron		Dover, Delaware	4–0	McClain (1–0)	Valek		44	4–1	
March 2	Akron		Dover, Delaware	13–1	Michael (1–0)	Steensen		47	5–1	
March 3	Akron		Dover, Delaware	10–11	Beaver (2–0)	Sharff (2–1)		39	5–2	
March 5	Delaware		Dover, Delaware	Postponed						
March 9	Saint Peter's		Dover, Delaware	13–7	McClain (2–0)	Hopf (1–1)		61	6–2	
March 9	Saint Peter's		Dover, Delaware	8–6	Michael (2–0)	Leiter (0–2)	Sharff (2)	46	7–2	
March 10	Saint Peter's		Dover, Delaware	6–3	Brown (1–0)	Morris (0–3)		38	8–2	
March 11	Penn		Dover, Delaware	1–4	Thomson (1–0)	Candeloro (0–2)	Reitcheck (1)	28	8–3	
March 11	Penn		Dover, Delaware	9–17	Hartman (1–0)	Evans (0–1)		49	8–4	
March 15	Norfolk State		Norfolk, Virginia,	12–1	McClain (3–0)	Bhatti (1–4)		211	9–4	1-0
March 15	Norfolk State		Norfolk, Virginia	1–2	Outman (2–1)	Michael (2–1)	Fulgo (1)	211	9–5	1-1
March 16	Norfolk State		Norfolk, Virginia	18–8	Candeloro (1–2)	Vales (1–3)		130	10–5	2-1
March 18	George Washington		Dover, Delaware	Cancelled						
March 20	Navy		Annapolis, Maryland	1–12	McCormick (1–1)	Thomas (0–1)		72	10–6	
March 22	Coppin State		Dover, Delaware	16–1	McClain (4–0)	Burgess		51	11–6	3-1
March 22	Coppin State		Dover, Delaware	6–7	Roberts	Gonzalez (1–1)		48	11–7	3-2
March 23	Coppin State		Dover, Delaware	6–8	O'Brien	Brown (1–1)		67	11–8	3-3
April 1	UMBC		Dover, Delaware	16–9	Thomas (1–1)	Gomez (1–1)		48	12–8	
April 2	Towson		Towson, Maryland	1–4	Patton (2–2)	Candeloro (1–3)	Gonnella (5)	185	12–9	
April 5	Norfolk State		Norfolk, Virginia,	14–10	Thomas (2–1)	Jones (0–3)		210	13–9	4-3
April 5	Norfolk State		Norfolk, Virginia	5–7	Bhatti (2–4)	Sharff (2–2)	Haynes (1)	210	13–10	4-4
April 6	Norfolk State		Norfolk, Virginia	19–10	Candeloro (2–3)	Butt (1–2)		178	14–10	5-4
April 8	Towson		Dover, Delaware	4–3	Sharff (3–2)	Gonnella (1–2)		103	15–10	
April 9	UMBC		Baltimore	5–17	Applegate (1–2)	Thomas (0–1)		106	15–11	
April 12	Coppin State		Anne Arundel, Maryland	10–1	McClain (5–0)	Devilme		65	16–11	6-4
April 12	Coppin State		Anne Arundel, Maryland	15–7	Sharff (4–2)	O'Brien		65	17–11	7-4
April 13	Coppin State		Anne Arundel, Maryland	15–5	Michael (3–1)	Burgess		51	18–11	8-4
April 15	La Salle		Philadelphia, Penn.	Cancelled						
April 18	UMES		Dover, Delaware	2-3(11)	Parker (1–0)	Sharff (4–3)	Repine (3)	69	18–12	8-5
April 18	UMES		Dover, Delaware	1–5	Parker (2–0)	Thomas (2–2)		57	18–13	8-6
April 19	UMES		Dover, Delaware	16–6	Michael (4–1)	Berry (1–5)		84	19–13	9-6
April 19	UMES		Dover, Delaware	15–8	Mordecai (1–0)	Black		124	20–13	10-6
April 23	Navy		Dover, Delaware	13–8	Sharff (5–3)	Sorenson (1–3)		77	21–13	
April 26	Norfolk State		Dover, Delaware	8–5	McClain (6–0)	Hemmerich (3–3)	Sharff (3)	119	22–13	11-6
April 26	Norfolk State		Dover, Delaware	4–2	Thomas (3–2)	Outman (5–2)		88	23–13	12-6
April 27	Norfolk State		Dover, Delaware	16–8	Michael (5–1)	Vales (1–5)		133	24–13	13-6
May 1	Delaware		Newark, Delaware	8-9(13)	Geffre (1–4)	Evans (0–1)		180	24–14	
May 3	Coppin State		Dover, Delaware	8-7(10)	Sharff (6–3)	Roberts (2–2)		74	25–14	14-6
May 3	Coppin State		Dover, Delaware	6–0	Thomas (4–2)	Davies (1–5)		69	26–14	15–6
May 4	Coppin State		Dover, Delaware	4–8	Devilme (3–4)	Michael (5–2)		87	26–15	15-7
May 9	UMES		Princess Anne, Maryland	8–3	McClain (7–0)	Parker (2–1)		85	27–15	16-7
May 9	UMES		Princess Anne, Maryland	5–3	Thomas (5–2)	Smith (2–7)	Sharff (4)	95	28–15	17-7
May 10	New York Tech		Dover, Delaware	8–7	Gonzalez (2–1)	Martinez (1–3)		158	29–15	
May 10	New York Tech		Dover, Delaware	10–7	Galati (1–0)	Plotkin (1–7)		107	30–15	

MEAC Tournament

Date	Opponent	Rank	Site/stadium	Score	Win	Loss	Save	Attendance	Overall record	MEAC record
May 14	(4S) Savannah State	(1N)	Norfolk, Virginia	4–8	Ricks (5–4)	Michael (5–3)		208	30–16	
May 15	(3N) Coppin State	(1N)	Norfolk, Virginia	1–6	O'Brien (2–2)	Gonzalez (2–2)		152	30–17	
