= 2014 Big Ten baseball tournament =

2014 Big Ten Conference baseball tournament
- Teams: 8
- Format: Double-elimination
- Finals site: TD Ameritrade Park; Omaha, NE
- Champions: Indiana (4th title)
- Winning coach: Tracy Smith (3rd title)
- MVP: Kyle Schwarber (Indiana)
- Television: BTN

2014 Big Ten Conference baseball standings
	Conf.						Overall
Team	W		L		T	PCT	W		L		T	PCT
No. 8 Indiana ‍†‍‡‍^{y}	21	–	3	–	0	.875	44	–	15	–	0	.746
No. 26 Nebraska ‍‍‍^{y}	18	–	6	–	0	.750	41	–	21	–	0	.661
Illinois ‍‍‍	17	–	7	–	0	.708	32	–	21	–	0	.604
Minnesota ‍‍‍	13	–	11	–	0	.542	27	–	24	–	0	.529
Michigan ‍‍‍	13	–	11	–	0	.542	30	–	29	–	1	.508
Michigan State ‍‍‍	11	–	13	–	0	.458	31	–	26	–	0	.544
Iowa ‍‍‍	10	–	14	–	0	.417	30	–	23	–	0	.566
Ohio State ‍‍‍	10	–	14	–	0	.417	30	–	28	–	0	.517
Northwestern ‍‍‍	7	–	16	–	0	.304	19	–	33	–	0	.365
Purdue ‍‍‍	6	–	18	–	0	.250	13	–	37	–	0	.260
Penn State ‍‍‍	5	–	18	–	0	.217	18	–	32	–	0	.360
† – Conference champion ‡ – Tournament champion y – Invited to the NCAA tournament Rankings from Coaches' Poll

The 2014 Big Ten Conference baseball tournament was held at TD Ameritrade Park in Omaha, NE from May 21 through 25. The eight team, double-elimination tournament determined the league champion for the 2014 NCAA Division I baseball season. Indiana won their second consecutive, and fourth overall, tournament championship and claimed the Big Ten Conference's automatic bid to the 2014 NCAA Division I baseball tournament. The event was aired on the Big Ten Network. This was the first time the event was held in Omaha and the first time it featured eight teams.

== Format and seeding ==
The 2014 tournament was an 8 team double-elimination tournament. The top eight teams based on conference regular season winning percentage earned invitations to the tournament. The teams then played a double-elimination tournament leading to a single championship game. This was the first year of this format in the Big Ten.

Team	W	L	Pct	GB	Seed
Indiana	21	3	.875	–	1
Nebraska	18	6	.750	3	2
Illinois	17	7	.708	4	3
Minnesota	13	11	.542	8	4
Michigan	13	11	.542	8	5
Michigan State	11	13	.458	10	6
Ohio State	10	14	.417	11	7
Iowa	10	14	.417	11	8
Northwestern	7	16	.304	13.5	–
Purdue	6	18	.250	15	–
Penn State	5	18	.217	15.5	–

== Tournament ==
First round
1	Indiana	5
8	Iowa	2
4	Minnesota	2
5	Michigan	3
7	Ohio State	5
3	Illinois	6
2	Nebraska	7
7	Ohio State	6
3	Illinois	1
6	Michigan State	2
8	Iowa	2
4	Minnesota	1

Second round
1	Indiana	5
5	Michigan	0
3	Illinois	2
6	Michigan State	11
2	Nebraska	3
6	Michigan State	2
8	Iowa	1
5	Michigan	7

Semifinals
1	Indiana	7	–
6	Michigan State	4	–
2	Nebraska	6	–
5	Michigan	1	–

Final
1	Indiana	8
2	Nebraska	4

== All-Tournament Team ==
The following players were named to the All-Tournament Team.

Pos	Name	School
P	Christian Morris	Indiana
P	Aaron Bummer	Nebraska
P	Kyle Kubat	Nebraska
C	Joel Fisher	Michigan State
1B	Dan Olinger	Minnesota
2B	Casey Rodrigue	Indiana
2B	Pat Kelly	Nebraska
SS	Travis Maezes	Michigan
3B	Dustin DeMuth	Indiana
DH	Scott Donley	Indiana
OF	Kyle Schwarber	Indiana
OF	Cam Gibson	Michigan State
OF	Ryan Boldt	Nebraska

=== Most Outstanding Player ===
Kyle Schwarber, an outfielder for Indiana, was named Tournament Most Valuable Player.
