= 2014 Houston Cougars baseball team =

American college baseball season

2014 Houston Cougars baseball

AAC tournament champions Baton Rouge Regional champions

Austin Super Regional, 0–2
- Conference: American Athletic Conference

Ranking
- Coaches: No. 11
- CB: No. 11
- Record: 48–18 (14–9 The American)
- Head coach: Todd Whitting (4th season)
- Assistant coaches: Trip Couch (4th season); Ryan Shotzberger (3rd season)
- Hitting coach: Mike Taylor (1st season)
- Pitching coach: Frank Anderson (2nd season)
- Home stadium: Cougar Field

2014 American Athletic Conference baseball standings
	Conf.				Overall
Team	W		L	PCT	W		L	PCT
No. 7 Louisville ‍†‍‍^{y}	19	–	5	.792	50	–	17	.746
UCF ‍‍‍	17	–	7	.708	36	–	23	.610
No. 11 Houston ‍‍‡‍^{y}	14	–	9	.609	48	–	18	.727
Rutgers ‍‍‍	14	–	9	.609	30	–	25	.545
South Florida ‍‍‍	10	–	14	.417	27	–	31	.466
Temple ‍‍‍	9	–	14	.391	15	–	32	.319
Connecticut ‍‍‍	9	–	14	.391	27	–	31	.466
Memphis ‍‍‍	8	–	16	.333	30	–	29	.508
Cincinnati ‍‍‍	6	–	18	.250	22	–	31	.415
† – Conference champion ‡ – Tournament champion y – Invited to the NCAA tournament As of June 26, 2014; Rankings from Collegiate Baseball

The 2014 Houston Cougars baseball team represented the University of Houston in the 2014 intercollegiate baseball season. Houston competed in Division I of the National Collegiate Athletic Association (NCAA) in its inaugural season as a member of the American Athletic Conference. The Cougars played home games at Cougar Field on the university's campus in Houston, Texas. Fourth-year head coach Todd Whitting, a former second baseman for the team during the 1992, 1994, and 1995 seasons and an assistant coach with the Cougars from 1996 through 2003, led the Cougars.

Upon winning the inaugural American Athletic Conference tournament, Houston entered the 2014 NCAA Division I baseball tournament for the nineteenth time in school history. In the Baton Rouge Regional, they defeated LSU to advance to the super regional round for the first time since 2003, and the fourth time in school history.

== Personnel ==
=== Coaches ===
2014 Houston Cougars baseball coaching staff
No.	Name	Position	Tenure	Alma mater
9	Todd Whitting	Head coach	4th season (Note: 12th season overall coaching with the Houston Cougars.)	University of Houston
11	Trip Couch	Recruiting Coordinator	4th season (Note: 10th season overall coaching with the Houston Cougars.)	University of Louisiana at Lafayette
14	Ryan Shotzberger	Assistant coach	3rd season	McDaniel College
3	Frank Anderson	Pitching Coach	2nd Season	Emporia State University
24	Mike Taylor	Assistant coach	1st Season	Prairie View A&M University

== Players ==
2014 Houston Cougars baseball team
Players
Coaches

#	Pos.	Name	B/T	Height	Weight	Year	Previous school	Home town
1	OF	Landon Appling	R/R	5 ft 10 in (1.78 m)	185 lb (84 kg)	Sr	El Campo	El Campo, TX
2	OF	Michael Pyeatt	L/R	5 ft 9 in (1.75 m)	190 lb (86 kg)	Jr	Brazoswood	Lake Jackson, TX
4	INF	Cole Coakley	R/R	5 ft 9 in (1.75 m)	170 lb (77 kg)	Jr	Alvin CC	Houston, TX
5	INF	Garrett Dominque	L/R	5 ft 11 in (1.8 m)	170 lb (77 kg)	Fr	Klein	Spring, TX
7	INF	Frankie Ratcliff	S/R	5 ft 9 in (1.75 m)	185 lb (84 kg)	Sr	Pensacola JC	Key West, FL
8	INF	Josh Vidales	S/R	5 ft 8 in (1.73 m)	160 lb (73 kg)	So	La Porte	La Porte, TX
12	RHP	Jared Robinson	R/R	6 ft 0 in (1.83 m)	180 lb (82 kg)	Jr	Midland JC	Lubbock, TX
13	RHP	Andrew Lantrip	R/R	6 ft 1 in (1.85 m)	170 lb (77 kg)	Fr	Livingston	Livingston, TX
14	LHP	Matt Locus	L/L	5 ft 11 in (1.8 m)	180 lb (82 kg)	Jr	San Jacinto JC	Katy, TX
15	RHP	Chase Wellbrock	R/R	5 ft 10 in (1.78 m)	200 lb (91 kg)	Sr	Brenham	Brenham, TX
17	C	Daniel Smith	R/R	5 ft 10 in (1.78 m)	190 lb (86 kg)	Sr	Santa Rosa JC	Cypress, TX
18	INF	Casey Grayson	L/L	6 ft 1 in (1.85 m)	215 lb (98 kg)	RS Sr	Navarro JC	Cypress, TX
19	RHP	Ryan Vruggink	R/R	6 ft 2 in (1.88 m)	205 lb (93 kg)	Jr	Clear Brook	Houston, TX
20	INF	Justin Montemayor	L/R	6 ft 3 in (1.91 m)	225 lb (102 kg)	So	Anderson	Austin, TX
21	RHP	Aaron Garza	R/R	6 ft 4 in (1.93 m)	200 lb (91 kg)	Jr	Ball	Galveston, TX
23	OF	Ashford Fulmer	R/R	6 ft 1 in (1.85 m)	190 lb (86 kg)	RS So	Cypress Ranch	Cypress, TX
25	RHP	Kirby Peek	R/R	6 ft 0 in (1.83 m)	220 lb (100 kg)	Fr	Jersey Village	Jersey Village, TX
26	RHP	Jake Lemoine	R/R	6 ft 5 in (1.96 m)	220 lb (100 kg)	So	Bridge City	Bridge City, TX
27	C	Caleb Barker	R/R	6 ft 3 in (1.91 m)	210 lb (95 kg)	Sr	Grayson County CC	Keller, TX
28	RHP	Bubba Maxwell	R/R	5 ft 11 in (1.8 m)	185 lb (84 kg)	RS So	Panola College	Vidor, TX
29	LHP	Tyler Ford	R/L	5 ft 8 in (1.73 m)	185 lb (84 kg)	Sr	Alvin CC	Richmond, TX
30	LHP	Aaron Stewart	L/L	5 ft 11 in (1.8 m)	190 lb (86 kg)	RS Sr	Blinn JC	Alvin, TX
31	C	Jacob Campbell	R/R	5 ft 10 in (1.78 m)	200 lb (91 kg)	So	Alvin	Alvin, TX
32	LHP	Jared West	L/L	6 ft 6 in (1.98 m)	215 lb (98 kg)	So	North Desoto	Frierson, LA
33	RHP	Kyle Dowdy	R/R	6 ft 2 in (1.88 m)	205 lb (93 kg)	Jr	Orange Coast College	San Diego, CA
34	OF	Kyle Survance	L/R	6 ft 1 in (1.85 m)	190 lb (86 kg)	So	Jersey Village	Jersey Village, TX
35	INF	Jordan Stading	L/R	6 ft 3 in (1.91 m)	205 lb (93 kg)	Fr	Second Baptist	Katy, TX
36	RHP	Cade Killingsworth	R/R	6 ft 4 in (1.93 m)	195 lb (88 kg)	Fr	Ridge Point	Missouri City, TX
36	RHP	David Longville	R/R	6 ft 3 in (1.91 m)	210 lb (95 kg)	Jr	Orange Coast College	Mission Viejo, CA
40	OF	Gino Marucci	R/R	5 ft 11 in (1.8 m)	175 lb (79 kg)	Fr	University	Baton Rouge, LA
41	LHP	Nathan Jackson	L/L	6 ft 1 in (1.85 m)	175 lb (79 kg)	Fr	Bellaire	Bellaire, TX
42	INF	Jacob Lueneburg	L/L	6 ft 0 in (1.83 m)	210 lb (95 kg)	RS Sr	Kishwaukee College	Caledonia, WI
43	RHP	Taylor Cobb	R/R	6 ft 3 in (1.91 m)	220 lb (100 kg)	Jr	Blinn JC	Houston, TX
44	INF	Connor Hollis	R/R	5 ft 10 in (1.78 m)	175 lb (79 kg)	Fr	Lamar	Arlington, TX

Head coach

Todd Whitting

Assistant coach(es)

Trip Couch
Ryan Shotzberger

Hitting coach(es)

Mike Taylor

Pitching coach(es)

Frank Anderson

Legend

- (C) Team captain
- (S) Suspended
- (I) Ineligible
- Injured
- Current redshirt

Roster
Last update: May 8, 2014

== Schedule ==
2014 Houston Cougars baseball team game log
Date	Time	Opponent^{#}	Rank^{#}	Site/Event	TV	Win	Loss	Save	Result	Attd.	Record
February 14	6:34 PM	Nicholls State		Cougar Field • Houston, TX		Aaron Garza (1–0)	Taylor Byrd (0–1)	Chase Wellbrock (1)	W 3–0	1,173	1–0
February 15	6:33 PM	Nicholls State		Cougar Field • Houston, TX		Jake Lemoine (1–0)	Ryan Deemes (0–1)		W 4–0	1,269	2–0
February 16	1:01 PM	Nicholls State		Cougar Field • Houston, TX		Jared West (1–0)	Grant Borne (0–1)	Tyler Ford (1)	W 3–2	1,101	3–0
February 19	4:33 PM	at #17 Rice		Reckling Park • Houston, TX (Silver Glove Series)		Tyler Ford (1–0)	Matt Ditman (0–1)		W 3–0	2,258	4–0
February 21	6:36 PM	Michigan		Cougar Field • Houston, TX		Aaron Garza (2–0)	Trent Szkutnick (0–1)	Chase Wellbrock (2)	W 3–0	1,120	5–0
February 22	6:33 PM	Michigan		Cougar Field • Houston, TX		Jared Robinson (1–0)	James Bourque (0–1)		W 1–0^{10 INN}	1,426	6–0
February 23	11:34 AM	Michigan		Cougar Field • Houston, TX		Bubba Maxwell (1–0)	Brett Adcock (0–2)	Chase Wellbrock (3)	W 4–3	1,010	7–0
February 23	6:30 PM	McNeese State		Cougar Field • Houston, TX		Suspended (weather). Resume: April 29					
February 28	12:05 PM	vs. #26 Texas Tech		Minute Maid Park • Houston, TX (Houston College Classic)	CSNH	Aaron Garza (3–0)	Dominic Moreno (0–2)		W 9–0	N/A	8–0
March 1	3:35 PM	vs. #24 Texas		Minute Maid Park • Houston, TX (Houston College Classic)	LHN	Parker French (2–1)	Jake Lemoine (1–1)	Nathan Thornhill (1)	L 3–2	N/A	8–1
March 2	5:05 PM	vs. #12 TCU		Minute Maid Park • Houston, TX (Houston College Classic)	CSNH	Alex Young (1–0)	Jared Robinson (1–1)	Riley Ferrell (1)	L 2–1	N/A	8–2
March 5	4:00 PM	Texas A&M–Corpus Christi		Cougar Field • Houston, TX		Matt Locus (1–0)	Kevin Landgrebe (1–1)		W 10–0	742	9–2
March 7	8:00 PM	at Southern California		Dedeaux Field • Los Angeles, CA (Dodgertown Classic)	Pac-12	Aaron Garza (4–0)	Kyle Tworney (0–1)		W 6–1	835	10–2
March 8	4:00 PM	at #16 UCLA		Jackie Robinson Stadium • Los Angeles (Dodgertown Classic)	Pac-12	Jake Lemoine (2–1)	Max Schuh (0–1)	Chase Wellbrock (4)	W 4–3	701	11–2
March 9	12:00 PM	at Pepperdine		Eddy D. Field Stadium • Malibu, CA (Dodgertown Classic)		Aaron Brown (3–0)	Jared West (1–1)	Eric Karch (1)	L 3–0	358	11–3
March 11	6:30 PM	Baylor		Cougar Field • Houston, TX		Andrew Lantrip (1–0)	Drew Tolson (0–3)		W 7–2	2,012	12–3
March 14	6:30 PM	Towson		Cougar Field • Houston, TX		Aaron Garza (5–0)	Chris Acker (2–1)	Chase Wellbrock (5)	W 6–3	1,188	13–3
March 15	4:00 PM	Towson		Cougar Field • Houston, TX		Jake Lemoine (3–1)	Bruce Zimmermann (3–1)		W 20–3	1,052	14–3
March 16	1:00 PM	Towson		Cougar Field • Houston, TX		Tyler Ford (2–0)	Brandon Gonnella (1–1)		W 7–6	1,081	15–3
March 18	6:30 PM	Lamar		Cougar Field • Houston, TX		Lance Warren (2–0)	Aaron Stewart (0–1)	Danny Fernandez (3)	L 4–2	1,221	15–4
March 19	6:30 PM	Texas Southern		Cougar Field • Houston, TX		Jared Robinson (2–1)	Jacob Martinez (0–3)		W 1–0^{10 INN}	1,216	16–4
March 21	6:30 PM	College of Charleston		Cougar Field • Houston, TX		Aaron Garza (6–0)	Taylor Clarke (4–2)		W 8–3	1,181	17–4
March 22	4:00 PM	College of Charleston		Cougar Field • Houston, TX		Jake Lemoine (4–1)	Bailey Ober (4–1)	Chase Wellbrock (6)	W 3–2	1,173	18–4
March 23	11:00 AM	College of Charleston		Cougar Field • Houston, TX		Jared West (2–1)	Nathan Helvey (2–2)		W 7–1	1,003	19–4
March 25	6:30 PM	#14 Rice	#18	Cougar Field • Houston, TX (Silver Glove Series)		Tyler Ford (3–0)	Caleb Smith (1–1)		W 6–2	2,481	20–4
March 28	6:30 PM	Memphis*	#18	Cougar Field • Houston, TX		Caleb Wallingford (4–1)	Aaron Garza (6–1)	Bryce Beeler (6)	L 2–1	1,126	20–5
March 29	6:35 PM	Memphis*	#18	Cougar Field • Houston, TX		Tyler Ford (4–0)	Jon Reed (3–1)		W 6–3	1,088	21–5
March 30	1:05 PM	Memphis*	#18	Cougar Field • Houston, TX		Chase Wellbrock (1–0)	Colin Lee (1–3)		W 6–2	1,225	22–5
April 1	6:35 PM	at Texas A&M	#17	Olsen Field at Blue Bell Park • College Station, TX		Bubba Maxwell (2–0)	Ty Schlottmann (0–1)	Chase Wellbrock (7)	W 10–8	4,707	23–5
April 5	11:00 AM	at Rutgers*	#17	Bainton Field • Piscataway, NJ		Howie Brey (3–1)	Aaron Garza (6–2)	Jon Young (6)	L 7–3	204	23–6
April 5	2:51 PM	at Rutgers*	#17	Bainton Field • Piscataway, NJ		Jake Lemoine (5–1)	Gaby Rose (2–2)		W 9–1	133	24–6
April 6	12:00 PM	at Rutgers*	#17	Bainton Field • Piscataway, NJ		Chase Wellbrock (2–0)	Kevin Baxter (1–5)		W 2–1	142	25–6
April 8	6:34 PM	Texas State	#16	Cougar Field • Houston, TX		Andrew Lantrip (2–0)	Dylan Bein (0–3)		W 7–1	1,227	26–6
April 11	7:00 PM	#11 Louisville*	#16	Cougar Field • Houston, TX		Kyle Funkhouser (7–1)	Aaron Garza (6–3)	Nick Burdi (6)	L 4–2	3,349	26–7
April 12	6:30 PM	#11 Louisville*	#16	Cougar Field • Houston, TX		Jared Ruxer (6–1)	Jake Lemoine (5–2)	Nick Burdi (7)	L 3–2	2,908	26–8
April 13	1:00 PM	#11 Louisville*	#16	Cougar Field • Houston, TX		Anthony Kidston (3–0)	Jared West (2–2)		L 10–3	1,283	26–9
April 15	6:30 PM	at Sam Houston State	#28	Don Sanders Stadium • Huntsville, TX		Andrew Lantrip (3–0)	Seth Holbert (1–1)	Tyler Ford (2)	W 5–2	1,191	27–9
April 17	6:30 PM	South Florida*	#28	Cougar Field • Houston, TX		Jared Robinson (3–1)	Jimmy Herget (5–5)	Chase Wellbrock (8)	W 3–2	1,026	28–9
April 18	6:30 PM	South Florida*	#28	Cougar Field • Houston, TX		Casey Mulholland (4–0)	Jake Lemoine (5–3)	Lawrence Pardo (2)	L 4–3	1,209	28–10
April 19	1:00 PM	South Florida*	#28	Cougar Field • Houston, TX		Chase Wellbrock (3–0)	Janick Serrallonga (1–2)		W 5–3	1,291	29–10
April 22	6:30 PM	Sam Houston State	#14	Cougar Field • Houston, TX		Seth Holbert (2–1)	Aaron Stewart (0–2)		L 5–4	1,121	29–11
April 25	5:30 PM	Cincinnati*	#14	Marge Schott Stadium • Cincinnati, OH		Tyler Ford (5–0)	Colton Cleary (0–2)		W 11–4	1,018	30–11
April 26	3:00 PM	Cincinnati*	#14	Marge Schott Stadium • Cincinnati, OH		Connor Walsh (4–6)	Jake Lemoine (5–4)	Austin Woodby (1)	L 3–0	483	30–12
April 27	11:00 AM	Cincinnati*	#14	Marge Schott Stadium • Cincinnati, OH		David Longville (1–0)	Grant Walker (2–4)		W 15–1	927	31–12
April 29	6:00 PM	at McNeese State		Cowboy Diamond • Lake Charles, LA		Aaron Stewart (1–2)	Cole Prejean (5–3)	Chase Wellbrock (9)	W 5–2	1,001	32–12
April 29	7:00 PM	McNeese State		Cowboy Diamond • Lake Charles, LA		Andrew Lantrip (4–0)	Lance Sefcik (1–1)	Bubba Maxwell (1)	W 8–2	323	33–12
May 2	6:30 PM	#18 Central Florida*		Cougar Field • Houston, TX		Eric Skoglund (8–1)	Aaron Garza (6–4)	Zach Rodgers (5)	L 4–3	1,226	33–13
May 3	6:30 PM	#18 Central Florida*		Cougar Field • Houston, TX		Bubba Maxwell (3–0)	Trent Thompson (1–5)		W 4–3	1,383	34–13
May 4	1:00 PM	#18 Central Florida*		Cougar Field • Houston, TX		Tyler Ford (6–0)	Tanner Olsen (3–3)	Chase Wellbrock (10)	W 5–2	1,488	35–13
May 6	6:30 PM	Prairie View A&M	#25	Cougar Field • Houston, TX		Andrew Lantrip (5–0)	Chadd Flick (1–5)		W 6–0	1,002	36–13
May 10	10:00 AM	at Connecticut*	#25	J. O. Christian Field • Storrs, CT		Aaron Garza (7–4)	Anthony Marzi (4–6)		W 3–1	113	37–13
May 10	3:30 PM	at Connecticut*	#25	J. O. Christian Field • Storrs, CT		Jake Lemoine (6–4)	Jordan Tabakman (3–4)	Tyler Ford (3)	W 7–2	107	38–13
May 11	10:00 AM	at Connecticut*	#25	J. O. Christian Field • Storrs, CT		Chase Wellbrock (4–0)	David Mahoney (2–4)		W 8–4	84	39–13
May 13	6:30 PM	vs. #21 Rice	#19	Constellation Field • Sugar Land, TX (Silver Glove Series)		Jared Robinson (4–1)	Chase McDowell (4–5)		W 7–3	2,643	40–13
May 15	2:00 PM	at Temple*	#19	Campbell's Field • Camden, NJ		Matt Hockenberry (5–5)	Jake Lemoine (6–5)	Patrick Krall (2)	L 4–1	114	40–14
May 17	10:00 AM	at Temple*	#19	Campbell's Field • Camden, NJ		Tyler Ford (7–0)	Patrick Vanderslice (1–4)	Chase Wellbrock (11)	W 7–5	367	41–14
May 17	2:00 PM	at Temple*	#19	Campbell's Field • Camden, NJ		Cancelled (weather).					
May 21	3:00 PM	vs. Temple	#19	Bright House Field • Clearwater, FL (American Athletic Conference tournament)		Andrew Lantrip (6–0)	Matt Hockenberry (5–6)	Tyler Ford (4)	W 3–0		42–14
May 22	11:00 AM	vs. Connecticut	#19	Bright House Field • Clearwater, FL (American Athletic Conference Tournament)		Jordan Tabakman (4–4)	Jake Lemoine (6–6)	Anthony Kay (2)	L 7–2		42–15
May 23	7:00 PM	vs. Central Florida	#19	Bright House Field • Clearwater, FL (American Athletic Conference Tournament)		Aaron Garza (8–4)	Eric Skoglund (9–3)	Chase Wellbrock (12)	W 13–8	1,327	43–15
May 25	12:00 PM	vs. #5 Louisville	#19	Bright House Field • Clearwater, FL (American Athletic Conference Tournament)	ESPNU	Tyler Ford (8–0)	Drew Harrington (3–2)		W 10–4	737	44–15
May 30	7:00 PM	vs. Bryant	#16	Alex Box Stadium/Skip Bertman Field • Baton Rouge, LA (NCAA Baton Rouge Regional)	ESPN3	Tyler Ford (9–0)	Kyle Wilcox (3–3)		W 3–2^{10 INN}	2,538	45–15
May 31	7:05 PM	at #7 Louisiana State	#16	Alex Box Stadium/Skip Bertman Field • Baton Rouge, LA (NCAA Baton Rouge Regional)	ESPN3	Aaron Nola (11–1)	Jake Lemoine (6–7)		L 5–1	10,436	45–16
June 1	2:05 PM	vs. Southeastern Louisiana	#16	Alex Box Stadium/Skip Bertman Field • Baton Rouge, LA (NCAA Baton Rouge Regional)	ESPN3	Aaron Garza (9–4)	Sean Kennel (5–4)		W 9–5	2,291	46–16
June 1	7:35 PM	at #7 Louisiana State	#16	Alex Box Stadium/Skip Bertman Field • Baton Rouge, LA (NCAA Baton Rouge Regional)	ESPN3	Chase Wellbrock (5–0)	Joe Broussard (3–2)		W 5–4^{11 INN}	9,482	47–16
June 2	8:00 PM	at #7 Louisiana State	#16	Alex Box Stadium/Skip Bertman Field • Baton Rouge, LA (NCAA Baton Rouge Regional)	ESPN3	Jared Robinson (5–1)	Parker Bugg (2–2)		W 12–2	9,032	48–16
June 6	3:00 PM	at #9 Texas	#7	UFCU Disch–Falk Field • Austin, TX (NCAA Austin Super Regional)	ESPN2	Nathan Thornhill (8–2)	Jake Lemoine (6–8)	John Curtiss (9)	L 4–2	7,385	48–17
June 7	1:00 PM	at #9 Texas	#7	UFCU Disch–Falk Field • Austin, TX (NCAA Austin Super Regional)	ESPN	Parker French (6–5)	Aaron Garza (9–5)		L 4–0	7,461	48–18
*American Athletic Conference game. ^{#}Rankings from Collegiate Baseball released prior to game. All times are in Central Time.

== Ranking movements ==
Ranking movements Legend: ██ Increase in ranking ██ Decrease in ranking — = Not ranked RV = Received votes ( ) = First-place votes
	Week																			
Poll	Pre	1	2	3	4	5	6	7	8	9	10	11	12	13	14	15	16	17	18	Final
Coaches'	—	—*	—	—	28	24	17 (1)	13	10	15	16	18	18	16	17	15				
Baseball America	—	—	—	—	—	23	17	10	8	14	14	16	16	16	16	15				
Collegiate Baseball^	—	—	—	—	—	—	18	17	16	28	14	—	25	19	19	16				
NCBWA†	—	RV	RV	RV	30	23	17	12	11	14	12	16	14	12	12	9	5	—	—	11

^ Collegiate Baseball ranked 40 teams in their preseason poll, but only ranked 30 teams weekly during the season.
† NCBWA ranks 30 teams in their preseason poll, but only ranks 25 teams weekly during the season.
* A new poll was not released for this week, so for comparison purposes, the previous week's ranking is inserted in this week's slot.

== Awards and honors ==
Caleb Barker

- Baton Rouge All-Regional Team
- First Team All-American Conference (C)
- American Weekly Honor Roll (March 17)
- Johnny Bench Award Watch List

Tyler Ford

- ABCA/Rawlings Second Team All-Central Region (RP)
- MVP: All-Silver Glove Series vs. Rice
- American Weekly Honor Roll (March 31)
- College Baseball 360 Primetime Performer (Feb. 27)
- American Pitcher of the Week (Feb. 24)

Aaron Garza

- Second Team All-American Conference (RHP)
- Gregg Olson Award Watch List
- USA Baseball Golden Spikes Midseason Award Watch List
- American Weekly Honor Roll (March 10)
- Houston College Classic MVP
- American Pitcher of the Week (March 3)
- American Weekly Honor Roll (Feb. 17)

Casey Grayson

- ABCA/Rawlings First Team All-Central Region (1B)
- American Championship All-Tournament Team
- Second Team All-American Conference (1B)
- All-Silver Glove Series vs. Rice
- All-Tournament Team Houston College Classic (1B)
- American Player of the Week (April 21)
- American Weekly Honor Roll (May 5)

Connor Hollis

- Third Team All-American Conference (3B)
- All-Silver Glove Series vs. Rice

Andrew Lantrip

- Louisville Slugger Freshman All-American
- American Championship All-Tournament Team
- American Rookie of the Year
- American Weekly Honor Roll (May 12)

Jake Lemoine

- Premier Player of College Baseball Winner
- Second Team All-American Conference
- USA Baseball Collegiate National Team (Summer '14) Invitee
- American Weekly Honor Roll (April 7)

Jacob Lueneburg

- All-Silver Glove Series vs. Rice
- All-Tournament Team Houston College Classic (DH)

Justin Montemayor

- CollegeSportsMadness Preseason All-American Athletic Conference First Team
- Perfect Game Preseason All-American Athletic Conference Team
- Preseason All-American Athletic Conference Team
- American Weekly Honor Roll (April 28)
- CoSIDA Academic All-District
- First Team All-American Conference (DH)

Michael Pyeatt

- Perfect Game Preseason All-American Athletic Conference Team
- All-Silver Glove Series vs. Rice

Frankie Ratcliff

- Perfect Game Preseason All-American Athletic Conference Team
- CollegeSportsMadness Preseason All-American Athletic Conference Second Team
- American Player of the Week (March 10)
- American Weekly Honor Roll (April 7)
- All-Silver Glove Series vs. Rice

Jared Robinson

- All-Silver Glove Series vs. Rice
- Baton Rouge All-Regional Team

Kyle Survance

- Baton Rouge Regional Most Outstanding Player
- Baton Rouge All-Regional Team
- American Championship All-Tournament Team
- Second Team All-American Conference (OF)
- All-Silver Glove Series vs. Rice
- All-Tournament Team Houston College Classic (OF)
- CollegeSportsMadness Preseason All-American Athletic Conference Second Team

Josh Vidales

- American Championship All-Tournament Team
- American Championship Most Outstanding Player

Chase Wellbrock

- CollegeSportsMadness Preseason All-American Athletic Conference Second Team
- NCBWA Stopper of the Year Watch List
- Houston Male Cougar of the Year
- Second Team All-American Conference (RHP)
- ABCA/Rawlings First Team All-Central Region (RP)

Jared West

- American Weekly Honor Roll (March 24)
- American Pitcher of the Week (Feb. 17)

== Cougars in the 2014 MLB draft ==
The following members of the Houston Cougar baseball program were drafted in the 2014 Major League Baseball draft.

Player	Position	Round	Overall	MLB team
Casey Grayson	1B	21st	645th	St. Louis Cardinals
Tyler Ford	LHP	27th	820th	Detroit Tigers
Aaron Garza	RHP	29th	866th	Milwaukee Brewers
Jared West	LHP	32nd	968th	Cleveland Indians
Chase Wellbrock	RHP	33rd	984th	Toronto Blue Jays
