= 2014 UCF Knights baseball team =

American college baseball season

2014 UCF Knights baseball
- Conference: American Athletic Conference
- Record: 36–23 (17–7 The American)
- Head coach: Terry Rooney (6th year)
- Assistant coaches: Ryan Klosterman (3rd year); Kevin Schnall (2nd year)
- Home stadium: Jay Bergman Field

2014 American Athletic Conference baseball standings
	Conf.				Overall
Team	W		L	PCT	W		L	PCT
No. 7 Louisville ‍†‍‍^{y}	19	–	5	.792	50	–	17	.746
UCF ‍‍‍	17	–	7	.708	36	–	23	.610
No. 11 Houston ‍‍‡‍^{y}	14	–	9	.609	48	–	18	.727
Rutgers ‍‍‍	14	–	9	.609	30	–	25	.545
South Florida ‍‍‍	10	–	14	.417	27	–	31	.466
Temple ‍‍‍	9	–	14	.391	15	–	32	.319
Connecticut ‍‍‍	9	–	14	.391	27	–	31	.466
Memphis ‍‍‍	8	–	16	.333	30	–	29	.508
Cincinnati ‍‍‍	6	–	18	.250	22	–	31	.415
† – Conference champion ‡ – Tournament champion y – Invited to the NCAA tournament As of June 26, 2014; Rankings from Collegiate Baseball

The 2014 UCF Knights baseball team represented the University of Central Florida in the 2014 college baseball season. The Knights competed in Division I of the National Collegiate Athletic Association (NCAA) and the American Athletic Conference (The American). The team played their home games at Jay Bergman Field (also known as the UCF Baseball Complex), located on UCF's main campus in Orlando, Florida. The Knights were led by head coach Terry Rooney, who was in his sixth season with the team.

== Personnel ==
=== Coaching staff ===
2014 UCF Knights coaching staff
- 26 Terry Rooney – Head Coach - 6th season
- 8 Ryan Klosterman - Assistant Coach – 3rd season
- 22 Kevin Schnall - Assistant Coach – 2nd season
- 7 Kyle Sprague - Assistant Coach – 1st season

=== Roster ===
2014 UCF Knights roster
Pitchers: 19 Vinnie Rosace - Freshman; 23 Tyler Martin - Sophomore; 25 Eric Skoglund - Junior; 27 Nathan Morris - Junior; 28 Tanner Olson - Junior; 31 Zach Favre - Sophomore; 32 Parker Thomas - Junior; 34 Mitchell Tripp - Redshirt Sophomore; 35 Spencer Davis - Redshirt Junior; 37 Danny Dixon - Junior; 38 Joe Marotta - Junior; 39 Zach Rodgers - Junior; 40 Drew Faintich - Freshman; 42 Trent Thompson - Freshman; 44 Ryan Meyer - Redshirt Sophomore	Infielders: 2 Dylan Moore - Junior; 3 Kam Gellinger - Freshman; 5 Brooks Morgan - Freshman; 13 James Vasquez - Junior; 14 Tommy Williams - Junior; 16 Sam Tolleson - Junior; 36 Bret Gordon - Senior; Utility: 21 Jarrod Petree - Redshirt Freshman	Catchers: 20 Hayden Platt - Freshman; 24 Kyle Perkins - Freshman; 29 Jordan Savinon - Junior; 30 Matt Diorio - Freshman; Outfielders: 6 JoMarcos Woods - Sophomore; 10 Erik Barber - Sophomore; 11 Dalton Duty - Freshman; 12 Chad Whiteaker - Junior; 15 Tyler Hayden - Freshman; 17 Derrick Salberg - Junior; 18 Eugene Vazquez - Freshman

== Schedule ==
2014 UCF Knights baseball game log
Regular season
February

Date	Opponent	Rank	Site/stadium	Score	Win	Loss	Save	Attendance	Overall record	Conf. Record
February 14	Siena	–	Jay Bergman Field	8–1	SKOGLUND, E. (1-0)	Gage (0-1)	None	1,891	1-0	–
February 15	Siena	–	Jay Bergman Field	11–4	DAVIS, S. (1-0)	Lewicki (0-1)	None	1,310	2-0	–
February 16	Siena	–	Jay Bergman Field	9–6	THOMAS, P. (1-0)	Quintana (0-1)	FAVRE, Z. (1)	1,477	3-0	–
February 18	at Florida	–	Alfred A. McKethan Stadium	1–5	Young (1-0)	MAROTTA, J. (0-1)	None	2,994	3-1	–
February 21	Ohio State	–	Jay Bergman Field	3–9	Lakins (1-0)	THOMAS, P. (0-1)	None	1,616	3-2	–
February 22	Oklahoma	–	Jay Bergman Field	4–1	DAVIS, S. (2-0)	Choplick, A. (1-1)	THOMPSON, T. (1)	1,493	4-2	–
February 23	The Citadel	–	Jay Bergman Field	9–7	OLSON, T. (1-0)	Livingston (0-1)	MARTIN, T. (1)	1,349	5-2	–
February 25	at Jacksonville	–	John Sessions Stadium	5–3	RODGERS, Z. (1-0)	Maxon, A. (0-1)	None	147	6-2	–
February 28	at #24 Ole Miss	–	Swayze Field	3–4	C. Bickel (2-1)	THOMAS, P. (1-2)	None	5,903	6-3	–

March

Date	Opponent	Rank	Site/stadium	Score	Win	Loss	Save	Attendance	Overall record	Conf. Record
March 1	at #24 Ole Miss	–	Swayze Field	4-5	W. Short (2-0)	THOMPSON, T. (0-1)	None	8,239	6-4	-
March 2	at #24 Ole Miss	–	Swayze Field	2-9	S. Smith (2-0)	HOWELL, R. (0-1)	None	6,035	6-5	–
March 4	at Bethune-Cookman	–	Jackie Robinson Ballpark	2-5	DURAPAU, M (2-0)	RODGERS, Z. (1-1)	AUSTIN, M (1)	218	6-6	–
March 5	Michigan	–	Jay Bergman Field	2-3	Balicki (1-1)	OLSON, T. (1-1)	Bourque (1)	1,330	6–7	-
March 7	Central Michigan	–	Jay Bergman Field	6-7	T. Black (1-1)	T. Thompson (0-2)	None	937	6-8	-
March 8	Central Michigan	–	Jay Bergman Field	2-3	T. Black (2-1)	P. Thomas (1-3)	J. McNamara (1)	1,058	6-9	–
March 9	Central Michigan	–	Jay Bergman Field	5-4	J. Petree (1-0)	N. Deeg (0-1)	T. Thompson (2)	1,073	7-9	–
March 11	#2 Florida State	–	Jay Bergman Field	10-11	D. Silva (1-0)	T. Thompson (0-3)	J. Winston (3)	3,953	7-10	–
March 12	#2 Florida State	–	Jay Bergman Field	1-18	B. Holtman (3-0)	T. Martin (0-1)	None	3,105	7-11	–
March 14	Central Connecticut	–	Jay Bergman Field	10-0	E. Skoglund (2-0)	Coughlin (0-1)	None	1,197	8-11	–
March 15	Central Connecticut	–	Jay Bergman Field	9-8	Z. Rodgers (2-1)	Severino (0-1)	None	1,279	9-11	–
March 16	Central Connecticut	–	Jay Bergman Field	4-5	Ingham (1-0)	T. Martin (0-2)	None	1,097	9-12	–
March 18	at #25 Miami	–	Alex Rodriguez Park at Mark Light Field	9-2	T. Olson (2-1)	D. Garcia (0-1)	None	2,406	10-12	–
March 21	Cincinnati*	–	Jay Bergman Field	7-1	E. Skoglund (3-0)	Atkinson (2-1)	None	1,239	11-12	1–0
March 22	Cincinnati*	–	Jay Bergman Field	7-4	J. Petree (2-0)	C. Walsh (2-3)	Z. Rodgers (1)	1,174	12-12	2–0
March 23	Cincinnati*	–	Jay Bergman Field	5-1	R. Meyer (1-0)	Zellner (1-2)	J. Marotta (1)	1,168	13-12	3–0
March 26	Bethune-Cookman	–	Jay Bergman Field	4-1	R. Meyer (2-0)	R. O'Brien (0-1)	T. Thompson (3)	1,305	14-12	3–0
March 28	Temple*	–	Jay Bergman Field	6-4	E. Skoglund (4-0)	Hockenberry (3-1)	Z. Rodgers (2)	1,279	15-12	4–0
March 29	Temple*	–	Jay Bergman Field	8-2	T. Olson (3-1)	Hill (0-4)	None	1,039	16-12	5–0
March 30	Temple*	–	Jay Bergman Field	12-5	Z. Rodgers (3-1)	Kuehn (1-1)	None	1,281	17-12	6–0

April

Date	Opponent	Rank	Site/stadium	Score	Win	Loss	Save	Attendance	Overall record	Conf. Record
April 1	at North Florida	–	Harmon Stadium	8-4	J. Marrota (1-1)	Nolan (1-2)	None	583	18-12	6-0
April 4	at South Florida*	–	USF Baseball Stadium	2-0	E. Skoglund (5-0)	Herget (4-4)	Z. Rodgers (3)	1,219	19-12	7-0
April 5	at South Florida*	–	USF Baseball Stadium	2-4	MULHOLLAND (3-0)	T. Olson (3-2)	None	1,189	19-13	7-1
April 6	at South Florida*	–	USF Baseball Stadium	6-3	Z. Rodgers (4-1)	Peterson (2-1)	T. Thompson (4)	1,739	20-13	8-1
April 9	#24 Miami	–	Jay Bergman Field	5-6	Garcia (3-2)	T. Thompson (0-4)	None	2,021	20-14	8-1
April 11	at Memphis*	–	FedExPark	1-2	Caufield (1-1)	E. Skoglund (5-1)	None	704	20-15	8-2
April 12	at Memphis*	–	FedExPark	9-8	Z. Farve (1-0)	Myers (0-1)	Z. Rodgers (1)	871	21-15	9-2
April 13	at Memphis*	–	FedExPark	10-0	R. Meyer (3-0)	Lee (1-4)	None	857	22-15	10-2
April 15	Florida A&M	–	Jay Bergman Field	11-4	R. Howell (1-1)	SCHAEFFER (0-2)	None	1,004	23-15	10-2
April 17	#9 Louisville*	–	Jay Bergman Field	8-2	E. Skoglund (6-1)	Funkhouser (7-2)	None	1,342	24-15	11-2
April 17	#9 Louisville*	–	Jay Bergman Field	4-3	T. Thompson (1-4)	Burdi (2-1)	None	1,342	25-15	12-2
April 18	#9 Louisville*	–	Jay Bergman Field	2-3	Kidston (4-0)	R. Myer (3-1)	Burdi (8)	1,194	25-16	12-3
April 25	Rutgers*	22	Jay Bergman Field	3-1	E. Skoglund (7-1)	Brey (4-2)	None	1,344	26-16	13-3
April 26	Rutgers*	22	Jay Bergman Field	4-3	Z. Rodgers (5-1)	Young (0-4)	None	1,253	27-16	14-3
April 27	Rutgers*	22	Jay Bergman Field	10-3	J. Petree (3-0)	Baxter (2-7)	None	1,183	28-16	15-3

May

Date	Opponent	Rank	Site/stadium	Score	Win	Loss	Save	Attendance	Overall record	Conf. Record
May 2	at #13 Houston*	18	Cougar Field	4–3	E. Skoglund (8–1)	Garza (6–4)	Z. Rodgers (5)	1,226	29–16	16–3
May 3	at #13 Houston*	18	Cougar Field	3–4	Maxwell (3–0)	T. Thompson (1–5)	None	1,383	29–17	16–4
May 4	at #13 Houston*	18	Cougar Field	2–5	Ford (6–0)	T. Olson (3–3)	Wellbrock (10)	1,448	29–18	16–5
May 6	Florida Atlantic	26	Jay Bergman Field	0–1	Rhodes (3–0)	S. Davis (2–1)	Alexander (6)	1,208	29–19	16–5
May 7	at Florida Atlantic	26	FAU Baseball Stadium	4–1	Z. Rodgers (6–1)	Strawn (4–6)	T. Thompson (5)	376	30–19	16–5
May 9	Presbyterian	26	Jay Bergman Field	10–0	E. Skoglund (9–1)	C. Knox (6–7)	None	1,104	31–19	16–5
May 10	Presbyterian	26	Jay Bergman Field	3–6	Wortkoetter (3–3)	T. Thompson (1–6)	None	1,293	31–20	16–5
May 11	Presbyterian	26	Jay Bergman Field	11–2	J. Petree (4–0)	T. Hayes (0–4)	None	1,239	32–20	16–5
May 13	at #4 Florida State	–	Dick Howser Stadium	8–3	R. Howell (2–1)	Byrd (1–1)	None	3,871	33–20	16–5
May 15	at Connecticut*	–	J. O. Christian Field	4–5	Marzi (5–6)	E. Skoglund (9–2)	Kay (1)	108	33–21	16–6
May 16	at Connecticut*	–	J. O. Christian Field	5–6	Kay (5–4)	Z. Favre (1–1)	None	116	33–22	16–7
May 17	at Connecticut*	–	J. O. Christian Field	7–6	R. Howell (3–1)	Brown (1–1)	P. Thomas (1)	127	34–22	17–7

Post Season
The American Tournament

Date	Opponent	Rank	Site/stadium	Score	Win	Loss	Save	Attendance	Tournament record
May 21	Connecticut	–	Bright House Field	7–1	Z. Rodgers (7–1)	Marzi (5–7)	None	–	1–0
May 22	Temple	–	Bright House Field	6–2	R. Howell (4–1)	Vanderslice (1–5)	None	1,157	2–0
May 23	Houston	–	Bright House Field	8–13	Garza (8–4)	E. Skoglund (9–3)	Wellbrock (12)	1,327	2–1

Rankings from USA TODAY/ESPN Top 25 coaches' baseball poll. Parenthesis indicate tournament seedings.
*Conference game

== See also ==
- UCF Knights
