= 2014 Indiana Hoosiers baseball team =

American college baseball season

2014 Indiana Hoosiers baseball

Big Ten regular season champions Big Ten Conference tournament champions

Bloomington Regional, L 4-5 vs. Stanford
- Conference: Big Ten Conference
- Record: 44-15 (21-3 Big Ten)
- Head coach: Tracy Smith (9th season)
- Home stadium: Bart Kaufman Field (Capacity: 2,500)

2014 Big Ten Conference baseball standings
	Conf.						Overall
Team	W		L		T	PCT	W		L		T	PCT
No. 8 Indiana ‍†‍‡‍^{y}	21	–	3	–	0	.875	44	–	15	–	0	.746
No. 26 Nebraska ‍‍‍^{y}	18	–	6	–	0	.750	41	–	21	–	0	.661
Illinois ‍‍‍	17	–	7	–	0	.708	32	–	21	–	0	.604
Minnesota ‍‍‍	13	–	11	–	0	.542	27	–	24	–	0	.529
Michigan ‍‍‍	13	–	11	–	0	.542	30	–	29	–	1	.508
Michigan State ‍‍‍	11	–	13	–	0	.458	31	–	26	–	0	.544
Iowa ‍‍‍	10	–	14	–	0	.417	30	–	23	–	0	.566
Ohio State ‍‍‍	10	–	14	–	0	.417	30	–	28	–	0	.517
Northwestern ‍‍‍	7	–	16	–	0	.304	19	–	33	–	0	.365
Purdue ‍‍‍	6	–	18	–	0	.250	13	–	37	–	0	.260
Penn State ‍‍‍	5	–	18	–	0	.217	18	–	32	–	0	.360
† – Conference champion ‡ – Tournament champion y – Invited to the NCAA tournament Rankings from Coaches' Poll

The 2014 Indiana Hoosiers baseball team is a college baseball team that represented Indiana University in the 2014 NCAA Division I baseball season. The Hoosiers are members of the Big Ten Conference (B1G) and played their home games at Bart Kaufman Field in Bloomington, Indiana. They were led by ninth-year head coach Tracy Smith.

Following the conclusion of the regular season, the Hoosiers were selected to play in the 2014 NCAA tournament, they would host the Bloomington Regional for the second consecutive year. Indiana would win the first two games to advance to the regional final where they would meet the Stanford Cardinal, the Hoosiers would lose back to back games and be eliminated from the Bloomington Regional by Stanford by a score of 4–5 in the final game.

== Previous season ==
The Hoosiers finished the 2013 NCAA Division I baseball season 49–16 overall (17-7 conference) and first place in conference standings. The Hoosiers were selected to play in the 2013 NCAA tournament, beginning by hosting the Bloomington Regional. The Hoosiers swept the Bloomington Regional with three straight wins to advance to their first-ever Super Regional. The Hoosiers would travel to Tallahassee to play Florida State in the Tallahassee Super Regional. Indiana would win the first two games to clinch their first-ever birth to the College World Series in Omaha. They would win the first game 2–0 over the Louisville Cardinals after a brilliant performance from starting pitcher Joey DeNato before losing their next two games and being eliminated.

== Roster ==
2014 Indiana Hoosiers roster
Pitchers: 8 Bell, Evan - Sophomore; 17 Eldred, CJ - Freshman; 21 Williams, Kent - Freshman; 14 Hart, Kyle - Sophomore; 21 Morris, Christian - Sophomore; 23 DeNato, Joey - Senior; 24 Stadler, Walker - Sophomore; 26 Moody, Nick - Freshman; 27 Korte, Brian - Senior; 28 Harrison, Luke - Junior; 31 Slegers, Aaron - RS Sophomore; 34 Halstead, Ryan - Senior; 35 Coursen-Carr, Will - Sophomore; 37 Effross, Scott - Sophomore; 43 Belcher, Thomas - Freshman; 44 Kelzer, Jacob - Freshman; 31 Foote, Austin - Freshman	Catchers: 10 Schwarber, Kyle - Sophomore; 12 Gibbs, Brent - Freshman; 7 Webb, Demetrius - Freshman; Infielders: 1 Ramos, Nick - Sophomore; 3 Donley, Scott - RS Junior; 6 Travis, Sam - Junior; 40 Flood, Brendan - Freshman; 9 Rodrigue, Casey - Freshman; 16 DeMuth, Dustin - Senior; 29 Goldaris, Eli - Junior; 18 Cangelosi, Austin - Freshman; 20 Smith, Casey - RS Junior; 13 Clark, Chad - Junior; 40 Wilhite, Brian - Sophomore	Outfielders: 4 Sujka, Chris - Junior; 11 Nolden, Will - Junior; 32 Cureton, Luke - Freshman; 24 Stadler, Sullivan - Sophomore; 36 O'Conner, Tim - Junior; 19 Alfonso, Ricky - Sophomore; 39 Dedelow, Craig - Sophomore

== Bloomington Regional ==
Bloomington Regional Teams
(1) Indiana Hoosiers	(2) Indiana State Sycamores	(3) Stanford Cardinal	(4) Youngstown State Penguins

First round
1	Indiana	10
4	Youngstown State	2
3	Stanford	8
2	Indiana State	1
Lower round 1
4	Youngstown State	5
2	Indiana State	2

Regional semifinals
1	Indiana	4
3	Stanford	2
Lower final
4	Youngstown State	4
3	Stanford	12

Regional final
1	Indiana
3	Stanford

- Bloomington Regional Scores Source
