= 2014 Colonial Athletic Association baseball tournament =

American college baseball tournament

- Teams: 6
- Format: Double-elimination tournament
- Finals site: Brooks Field (Wilmington); Wilmington, North Carolina
- Champions: College of Charleston (1st title)
- Winning coach: Monte Lee (1st title)
- MVP: Bailey Ober (College of Charleston)

2014 Colonial Athletic Association baseball standings
	Conf.				Overall
Team	W		L	PCT	W		L	PCT
William & Mary ‍†‍‍	15	–	5	.750	34	–	22	.607
No. 16 College of Charleston ‍‍‡‍^{y}	15	–	6	.714	44	–	19	.698
UNC Wilmington ‍‍‍	10	–	9	.526	30	–	27	.526
Delaware ‍‍‍	10	–	10	.500	26	–	27	.491
Northeastern ‍‍‍	9	–	12	.429	26	–	29	.473
James Madison ‍‍‍	8	–	12	.400	17	–	36	.321
Hofstra ‍‍‍	7	–	11	.389	20	–	24	.455
Towson ‍‍‍	4	–	13	.235	22	–	25	.468
† – Conference champion ‡ – Tournament champion y – Invited to the NCAA tournament As of June 30, 2014; Rankings from Collegiate Baseball

The 2014 Colonial Athletic Association baseball tournament was held at Brooks Field on the campus of UNC Wilmington in Wilmington, North Carolina, from May 21 through 24. In its first season in the conference, College of Charleston won the tournament for the first time, earning the Colonial Athletic Association's automatic bid to the 2014 NCAA Division I baseball tournament.

== Seeding and format ==
Continuing the format adopted in 2012, the top six finishers from the regular season competed in the double-elimination tournament. The top two seeds, William & Mary and College of Charleston, earned first round byes.

Team	W	L	Pct.	GB	Seed
William & Mary	15	5	.750	–	1
College of Charleston	15	6	.714	.5	2
UNC Wilmington	10	9	.526	4.5	3
Delaware	10	10	.500	5	4
Northeastern	9	12	.429	6.5	5
James Madison	8	12	.400	7	6
Hofstra	7	11	.389	7	–
Towson	4	13	.235	9.5	–

== Bracket ==
Upper round 1	Upper round 2	Upper final	Final
1	William & Mary	11
4	Delaware	4	4	Delaware	4
5	Northeastern	3	1	William & Mary	1
2	College of Charleston	3
2	College of Charleston	7
3	UNC Wilmington	11	3	UNC Wilmington	4
6	James Madison	10
2	College of Charleston	6	—
1	William & Mary	4	—
Lower round 1	Lower round 2	Lower round 3	Lower final
3	UNC Wilmington	6
4	Delaware	3	1	William & Mary	12
5	Northeastern	2	3	UNC Wilmington	5
5	Northeastern	3	4	Delaware	3
6	James Madison	1

== All-Tournament Team ==
The following players were named to the All-Tournament team. College of Charleston pitcher Bailey Ober, one of the Cougars' five selections, was named Most Outstanding Player.

Name	School
Nick Berger	Northeastern
Brandon Hinkle	Delaware
Corey Dick	UNC Wilmington
Drew Farber	UNC Wilmington
Nick Brown	William & Mary
Ryan Hissey	William & Mary
Josh Smith	William & Mary
Ben Boykin	College of Charleston
Bailey Ober	College of Charleston
Nick Pappas	College of Charleston
Tyler Thornton	College of Charleston
Carl Wise	College of Charleston
