= 2014 Mid-Eastern Athletic Conference baseball tournament =

- Teams: 8
- Format: Double-elimination tournament
- Finals site: Marty L. Miller Field; Norfolk, VA
- Champions: Bethune-Cookman (14th title)
- Winning coach: Jason Beverlin (2nd title)
- MVP: Montana DuRapau (Bethune-Cookman)

2014 Mid-Eastern Athletic Conference baseball standings
	Conf.						Overall
Team	W		L		T	PCT	W		L		T	PCT
Northern
Delaware State ^{x}‍‍‍	17	–	7	–	0	.708	30	–	17	–	0	.638
Norfolk State ‍‍‍	14	–	10	–	0	.583	20	–	25	–	0	.444
Coppin State ‍‍‍	9	–	15	–	0	.375	12	–	33	–	0	.267
Maryland Eastern Shore ‍‍‍	8	–	16	–	0	.333	13	–	35	–	0	.271
Southern
Florida A&M ^{x}‍‍‍	14	–	10	–	0	.583	25	–	25	–	0	.500
Bethune–Cookman ^{x}‍‍‍	14	–	10	–	0	.583	24	–	31	–	0	.436
North Carolina Central ‍‍‍	12	–	12	–	0	.500	19	–	32	–	1	.375
Savannah State ‍‍‍	11	–	13	–	0	.458	21	–	30	–	0	.412
North Carolina A&T ‍‍‍	9	–	15	–	0	.375	17	–	32	–	0	.347
x – Division champion ‡ – Tournament champion As of May 16, 2014; Rankings from Collegiate Baseball

The 2014 Mid-Eastern Athletic Conference baseball tournament began on May 14 and ended on May 19 at Marty L. Miller Field, on the campus of Norfolk State University in Norfolk, Virginia. It was an eight-team double elimination tournament. Bethune-Cookman won their fourteenth tournament championship to claim the Mid-Eastern Athletic Conference's automatic bid to the 2014 NCAA Division I baseball tournament. Bethune-Cookman has claimed fourteen of the sixteen tournament championships, with Savannah State winning in 2013 and North Carolina A&T earning the 2005 title.

== Format and seeding ==
The four teams in the North Division and top four finishers from the South Division were seeded one through four based on regular season records, with first round matchups of the top seed from the North and the fourth seed from the South, the second seed from the North against the third seed from the South, and so on. The winners advanced in the winners' bracket, while first round losers play elimination games. The format means that one team from the South, North Carolina A&T, was left out of the field.

Team	W	L	Pct.	GB	Seed
Northern Division
Delaware State	17	7	.708	–	1N
Norfolk State	14	10	.583	3	2N
Coppin State	9	15	.375	8	3N
Maryland Eastern Shore	8	16	.333	9	4N
Southern Division
Bethune-Cookman	14	10	.583	–	1S
Florida A&M	14	10	.583	–	2S
North Carolina Central	12	12	.500	2	3S
Savannah State	11	13	.458	3	4S
North Carolina A&T	9	15	.375	5.5	–

Rain forced adjustments in the schedule, with all three third round games postponed by one day to Saturday.

== Bracket ==
Upper round 1	Upper round 2	Upper final	Final
1S	Bethune-Cookman	4
4N	Maryland Eastern Shore	0
1S	Bethune-Cookman	10
2N	Norfolk State	2
2N	Norfolk State	6
3S	North Carolina Central	1
1S	Bethune-Cookman	16
4S	Savannah State	6
2S	Florida A&M	10
3N	Coppin State	0
2S	Florida A&M	6
4S	Savannah State	14
1N	Delaware State	4
4S	Savannah State	8	1S	Bethune-Cookman	4	—
2N	Norfolk State	2	—
Lower round 1	Lower round 2	Lower round 3	Lower final
2N	Norfolk State	10
4N	Maryland Eastern Shore	5	3S	North Carolina Central	1	4S	Savannah State	0
3S	North Carolina Central	10	2N	Norfolk State	6	2N	Norfolk State	5
2S	Florida A&M	3
2S	Florida A&M	11
3N	Coppin State	6	3N	Coppin State	6
1N	Delaware State	1

== All-Tournament Team ==
The following players were named to the All-Tournament Team.

Name	School
Zach Brigham	Savannah State
Mendez Elder	Savannah State
Stephen Bull	Maryland Eastern Shore
Bennie Robinson	Florida A&M
Marlon Gibbs	Florida A&M
Matt Outman	Norfolk State
Joshua Vales	Norfolk State
Ross Caldwell	Norfolk State
Montana Durapau	Bethune-Cookman
Shawn McCarty	Bethune-Cookman
Zach Olszewski	Bethune-Cookman

=== Most Outstanding Performer ===
Montana Durapau was named Tournament Most Outstanding Performer. Durapau was a pitcher for Bethune-Cookman.
