= 2014 Horizon League baseball tournament =

- Teams: 6
- Format: Double-elimination
- Finals site: Kapco Park; Milwaukee, WI
- Champions: Youngstown State (2nd title)
- Winning coach: Steve Gillispie (1st title)
- MVP: Phil Lipari (Youngstown State)

2014 Horizon League baseball standings
	Conf.				Overall
Team	W		L	PCT	W		L	PCT
Wright State ‍†‍‍	25	–	4	.862	35	–	22	.614
UIC ‍‍‍	17	–	13	.567	24	–	27	.471
Valparaiso ‍‍‍	12	–	12	.500	25	–	28	.472
Milwaukee ‍‍‍	10	–	14	.417	21	–	29	.420
Oakland ‍‍‍	7	–	17	.292	12	–	33	.267
Youngstown State ‍‍‡‍^{y}	6	–	17	.261	17	–	38	.309
† – Conference champion ‡ – Tournament champion y – Invited to the NCAA tournament Rankings from Collegiate Baseball

The 2014 Horizon League baseball tournament was held from May 21 through 24. All six of the league's teams met in the double-elimination tournament held at Kapco Park on the campus of Concordia University Wisconsin in Milwaukee. Youngstown State won the tournament for the second time, earning the conference's automatic bid to the 2014 NCAA Division I baseball tournament.

== Seeding and format ==
The league's six teams were seeded one through six based on winning percentage, using conference games only. They then played a double-elimination tournament, with the top two seeds (top-seeded Wright State and UIC) earning a single bye.

Team	W	L	Pct	GB	Seed
Wright State	25	4	.862	–	1
UIC	17	13	.567	8.5	2
Valparaiso	12	12	.500	10.5	3
Milwaukee	10	14	.417	12.5	4
Oakland	7	17	.292	15.5	5
Youngstown State	6	17	.261	16	6

== Bracket ==
Upper round 1	Upper round 2	Upper final	Final
1	Wright State	1
3	Valparaiso	3	6	Youngstown State	7
6	Youngstown State	7	6	Youngstown State	11
4	Milwaukee	5
2	UIC	4
4	Milwaukee	4	4	Milwaukee	12
5	Oakland	2
6	Youngstown State	5	–
1	Wright State	4	–
Lower round 1	Lower round 2	Lower round 3	Lower final
1	Wright State	4
3	Valparaiso	0	4	Milwaukee	3
3	Valparaiso	1	1	Wright State	7
5	Oakland	0	2	UIC	0
3	Valparaiso	2

== All-Tournament Team ==
The following players were named to the All-Tournament Team. Youngstown State second baseman Phil Lipari, one of five Penguins selected, was named Most Valuable Player.

Pos.	Name	Team
P	Andrew Elliott	Wright State
P	Jeremy Quinlan	Youngstown State
C	Josh White	Youngstown State
1B	Andrew Bynum	Valparaiso
2B	Phil Lipari	Youngstown State
SS	Shane Willoughby	Youngstown State
3B	Matt Sullivan	Youngstown State
OF	Robby Enslen	Oakland
OF	Ryan Solberg	Milwaukee
OF	Jeff Limbaugh	Wright State
DH	Pat Wilson	Milwaukee
