= 2014 College Baseball All-America Team =

This is a list of college baseball players named first team All-Americans for the 2014 NCAA Division I baseball season. From 2011 to 2014, there were five generally recognized All-America selectors for baseball: the American Baseball Coaches Association, Baseball America, Collegiate Baseball Newspaper, the National Collegiate Baseball Writers Association, and Perfect Game. In order to be considered a "consensus" All-American, a player must have been selected by at least three of these.

== Key ==
| A | American Baseball Coaches Association |
| B | Baseball America |
| C | Collegiate Baseball Newspaper |
| N | National Collegiate Baseball Writers Association |
| P | Perfect Game |
| | Member of the National College Baseball Hall of Fame |
| | Consensus All-American – selected by all five organizations |
| | Consensus All-American – selected by three or four organizations |

== All-Americans ==
| Position | Name | School | # | A | B | C | N | P | Other awards and honors |
|---|---|---|---|---|---|---|---|---|---|
| Starting pitcher | Casey Bloomquist | Cal Poly | 1 | — | — | — | ✓ | — | |
| Starting pitcher | Chris Diaz | Miami (FL) | 1 | — | — | ✓ | — | — | |
| Starting pitcher | Blake Fox | Rice | 1 | — | — | — | ✓ | — | |
| Starting pitcher | Jace Fry | Oregon State | 3 | ✓ | — | ✓ | ✓ | — | |
| Starting pitcher | Kyle Freeland | Evansville | 2 | — | ✓ | — | — | ✓ | |
| Starting pitcher | Kyle Funkhouser | Louisville | 1 | ✓ | — | — | — | — | |
| Starting pitcher | Nathan Kirby | Virginia | 4 | ✓ | ✓ | ✓ | — | ✓ | |
| Starting pitcher | Andrew Morales | UC Irvine | 3 | ✓ | — | ✓ | — | ✓ | Senior CLASS Award |
| Starting pitcher | Aaron Nola | LSU | 5 | ✓ | ✓ | ✓ | ✓ | ✓ | National Pitcher of the Year |
| Starting pitcher | Ben Wetzler | Oregon State | 3 | — | ✓ | ✓ | ✓ | — | |
| Relief pitcher | Nick Burdi | Louisville | 4 | ✓ | — | ✓ | ✓ | ✓ | Stopper of the Year |
| Relief pitcher | Michael Cederoth | San Diego State | 1 | — | — | ✓ | — | — | |
| Relief pitcher | Jacob Lindgren | Mississippi State | 2 | — | ✓ | — | — | ✓ | |
| Relief pitcher | Brendan McCurry | Oklahoma State | 1 | — | — | — | ✓ | — | |
| Relief pitcher | Sam Moore | UC Irvine | 1 | — | — | — | ✓ | — | |
| Catcher | Max Pentecost | Kennesaw State | 5 | ✓ | ✓ | ✓ | ✓ | ✓ | Johnny Bench Award |
| First baseman | Casey Gillaspie | Wichita State | 5 | ✓ | ✓ | ✓ | ✓ | ✓ | |
| Second baseman | Jace Conrad | Louisiana–Lafayette | 5 | ✓ | ✓ | ✓ | ✓ | ✓ | |
| Shortstop | Blake Trahan | Louisiana–Lafayette | 1 | ✓ | — | — | — | — | |
| Shortstop | Trea Turner | NC State | 4 | — | ✓ | ✓ | ✓ | ✓ | Brooks Wallace Award |
| Third baseman | Matt Chapman | Cal State Fullerton | 1 | ✓ | — | — | — | — | |
| Third baseman | Dustin DeMuth | Indiana | 2 | — | ✓ | — | — | ✓ | |
| Third baseman | Daniel Miles | Tennessee Tech | 2 | — | — | ✓ | ✓ | — | |
| Outfielder | Caleb Adams | Louisiana–Lafayette | 2 | — | ✓ | — | — | ✓ | |
| Outfielder | Austin Bousefield | Ole Miss | 1 | ✓ | — | — | — | — | |
| Outfielder | Michael Conforto | Oregon State | 5 | ✓ | ✓ | ✓ | ✓ | ✓ | |
| Outfielder | Michael Katz | William & Mary | 3 | ✓ | — | ✓ | ✓ | — | |
| Outfielder | D. J. Stewart | Florida State | 1 | ✓ | — | — | — | — | |
| Outfielder | Brandon Thomasson | Tennessee Tech | 2 | — | — | ✓ | ✓ | — | |
| Outfielder | Drew Weeks | North Florida | 1 | — | — | — | ✓ | — | |
| Outfielder | Bradley Zimmer | San Francisco | 3 | ✓ | ✓ | — | — | ✓ | |
| Designated hitter | Derek Gibson | Southeast Missouri State | 1 | — | — | — | ✓ | — | |
| Designated hitter | Kyle Schwarber | Indiana | 2 | — | ✓ | — | — | ✓ | |
| Utility player | Aaron Brown | Pepperdine | 1 | ✓ | — | — | — | — | |
| Utility player | A. J. Reed | Kentucky | 5 | ✓ | ✓ | ✓ | ✓ | ✓ | Dick Howser Trophy Golden Spikes Award ABCA Player of the Year Baseball America Player of the Year Collegiate Baseball Player of the Year John Olerud Award |

== See also ==
- List of college baseball awards
