= 2014 Grand Canyon Antelopes baseball team =

American college baseball season

2014 Grand Canyon Antelopes baseball
- Conference: Western Athletic Conference
- Record: 30–23 (19–8 WAC)
- Head coach: Andy Stankiewicz (3rd season)
- Assistant coaches: Gregg Wallis (1st season); Ryan Cisterna (3rd season)
- Pitching coach: Nathan Choate (3rd season)
- Home stadium: Brazell Stadium

2014 Western Athletic Conference baseball standings
	Conf.				Overall
Team	W		L	PCT	W		L	PCT
Sacramento State ‍†‍‡‍^{y}	21	–	6	.778	40	–	24	.625
Grand Canyon ‍‍‍	19	–	8	.704	30	–	23	.566
Texas–Pan American ‍‍‍	17	–	10	.630	27	–	30	.474
Utah Valley ‍‍‍	16	–	11	.593	28	–	30	.483
Cal State Bakersfield ‍‍‍	15	–	12	.556	26	–	33	.441
Seattle ‍‍‍	13	–	11	.542	26	–	27	.491
New Mexico State ‍‍‍	11	–	13	.458	23	–	31	.426
North Dakota ‍‍‍	8	–	16	.333	10	–	29	.256
Chicago State ‍‍‍	5	–	19	.208	17	–	37	.315
Northern Colorado ‍‍‍	4	–	23	.148	10	–	43	.189
† – Conference champion ‡ – Tournament champion y – Invited to the NCAA tournament Rankings from Collegiate Baseball

The 2014 Grand Canyon Antelopes baseball team represented Grand Canyon University in the 2014 NCAA Division I baseball season. The 'Lopes played their home games at Brazell Stadium and were first-year members of the Western Athletic Conference. The team was coached by Andy Stankiewicz in his 3rd season at Grand Canyon.

== Previous season ==
The 'Lopes were coming off of a 40–19 overall record and a 26–10 conference record, competing in the Division II PacWest Conference, where they were crowned Co-Conference Champions. Grand Canyon advanced to the NCAA Division II Baseball Championship where they went 1–2, eventually being eliminated with a loss to St. Edward's University.

== Roster ==
2014 Grand Canyon Antelopes roster
Pitchers: 8 Scott Serigstad - Freshman; 12 Ethan Evanko - Freshman; 14 Jaren Drummond - Sophomore; 23 Brandon Bonilla - Junior; 26 Robert Beltran - Freshman; 28 Joey Wise - Freshman; 31 Houston Edwards - R Freshman; 33 Andrew Naderer - Sophomore; 34 Malcolm Purdy - Senior; 35 Jorge Perez - Junior; 37 Trent Wilson - Senior; 38 Kyle Detwiler - Sophomore; 40 Kevin Behnke - Senior; 43 Connor Belfiore - Junior; 45 Zebastian Valenzuela - Freshman	Catchers: 24 Josh Meyer - Freshman; 42 Humberto Aranda - Junior; Infielders: 1 Josh Ethier - Freshman; 3 Paul Panaccione - Sophomore; 4 Ben Mauseth - Freshman; 6 Seth Fretheim - Sophomore; 7 Michael Pomeroy - R Senior; 11 Charles Wagner - Junior; 15 Chris Lindmark - Senior; 18 Dominic Portocarrera - Junior; 29 Jon Kealoha - Junior; 30 Chad De La Guerra - Junior; 32 Zayne Clancy - Freshman; 36 Rouric Bridgewater - Junior	Outfielders: 2 David Walker - Junior; 5 Brian Kraft - Sophomore; 7 Michael Pomeroy - R Senior; 13 Brandon Smith - Sophomore; 21 Garrett Jeffries - Sophomore; 27 Matt Haggerty - Freshman

== Coaches ==
2014 Grand Canyon Antelopes baseball coaching staff
- Andy Stankiewicz - Head coach - 3rd year
- Nathan Choate - Pitching coach - 3rd year
- Gregg Wallis - Assistant coach - 1st year
- Ryan Cisterna - Assistant coach - 3rd year

== Schedule ==
2014 Grand Canyon Antelopes baseball game log
Regular season
February

Date	Opponent	Site/stadium	Score	Attendance	Overall record	WAC record
Feb 14	@ Louisiana-Monroe	Warhawk Field • Monroe, LA	3-6	877	0–1	–
Feb 15	@ Louisiana-Monroe	Warhawk Field • Monroe, LA	4–5	864	0–2	–
Feb 16	@ Louisiana-Monroe	Warhawk Field • Monroe, LA	7–1	764	1-2	–
Feb 18	@ Fresno State	Pete Beiden Field • Fresno, CA	1-10	1,261	1–3	–
Feb 21	vs Hofstra	Brazell Stadium • Phoenix, AZ	8-1	612	2–3	–
Feb 22	vs Hofstra	Brazell Stadium • Phoenix, AZ	10-3	205	3-3	-
Feb 22	vs Hofstra	Brazell Stadium • Phoenix, AZ	5-7	171	3-4	-
Feb 23	vs Hofstra	Brazell Stadium • Phoenix, AZ	9-2	192	4-4	
Feb 28	vs Kansas State	Crutcher Scott Field • Abilene, TX	4-9	228	4-5	-

March

Date	Opponent	Site/stadium	Score	Attendance	Overall record	WAC record
Mar 1	vs Kansas State	Crutcher Scott Field • Abilene, TX	1-11	225	4-6	-
Mar 1	@ Abilene Christian	Crutcher Scott Field • Abilene, TX	2-3 (10)	751	4-7	-
Mar 7	vs Nebraska-Omaha	Brazell Stadium • Phoenix, AZ	0-6	204	4-8	-
Mar 8	vs Nebraska-Omaha	Brazell Stadium • Phoenix, AZ	9-2	191	5-8	-
Mar 8	vs Nebraska-Omaha	Brazell Stadium • Phoenix, AZ	14-0 (7)	122	6-8	-
Mar 9	vs Nebraska-Omaha	Brazell Stadium • Phoenix, AZ	5-2	211	7-8	-
Mar 14	@ Bakersfield	Hardt Field • Bakersfield, CA				
Mar 15	@ Bakersfield	Hardt Field • Bakersfield, CA				
Mar 16	@ Bakersfield	Hardt Field • Bakersfield, CA				
Mar 18	@ Arizona	Hi Corbett Field • Tucson, AZ				
Mar 21	vs UC Irvine	Cicerone Field • Irvine, CA				
Mar 22	vs UC Irvine	Cicerone Field • Irvine, CA				
Mar 23	vs UC Irvine	Cicerone Field • Irvine, CA				
Mar 28	vs Chicago State	Brazell Stadium • Phoenix, AZ				
Mar 29	vs Chicago State	Brazell Stadium • Phoenix, AZ				
Mar 30	vs Chicago State	Brazell Stadium • Phoenix, AZ				
Mar 31	@ Nevada	William Peccole Park • Reno, NV				

April

Date	Opponent	Site/stadium	Score	Attendance	Overall record	WAC record
Apr 1	@ Nevada	William Peccole Park • Reno, NV				
Apr 4	@ Texas-Pan American	Edinburg Stadium • Edinburg, TX				
Apr 5	@ Texas-Pan American	Edinburg Stadium • Edinburg, TX				
Apr 6	@ Texas-Pan American	Edinburg Stadium • Edinburg, TX				
Apr 11	vs Sacramento State	Brazell Stadium • Phoenix, AZ				
Apr 12	vs Sacramento State	Brazell Stadium • Phoenix, AZ				
Apr 13	vs Sacramento State	Brazell Stadium • Phoenix, AZ				
Apr 15	@ Kansas	Hoglund Ballpark • Lawrence, KS				
Apr 16	@ Kansas	Hoglund Ballpark • Lawrence, KS				
Apr 18	@ Northern Colorado	Jackson Field • Greeley, CO				
Apr 19	@ Northern Colorado	Jackson Field • Greeley, CO				
Apr 20	@ Northern Colorado	Jackson Field • Greeley, CO				
Apr 25	vs New Mexico State	Brazell Stadium • Phoenix, AZ				
Apr 26	vs New Mexico State	Brazell Stadium • Phoenix, AZ				
Apr 27	vs New Mexico State	Brazell Stadium • Phoenix, AZ				

May

Date	Opponent	Site/stadium	Score	Attendance	Overall record	WAC record
May 2	@ Seattle U	Bannerwood Park • Bellevue, WA				
May 3	@ Seattle U	Bannerwood Park • Bellevue, WA				
May 4	@ Seattle U	Bannerwood Park • Bellevue, WA				
May 5	@ Washington	Husky Ballpark • Seattle, WA				
May 9	@ North Dakota	Harold Kraft Memorial Field • Grand Forks, ND				
May 10	@ North Dakota	Harold Kraft Memorial Field • Grand Forks, ND				
May 11	@ North Dakota	Harold Kraft Memorial Field • Grand Forks, ND				
May 16	vs Utah Valley	Brazell Stadium • Phoenix, AZ				
May 17	vs Utah Valley	Brazell Stadium • Phoenix, AZ				
May 18	vs Utah Valley	Brazell Stadium • Phoenix, AZ				
May 19	@ USC	Dedeaux Field • Los Angeles, CA				
May 20	@ UC Riverside	Riverside Sports Complex • Riverside, CA				
