= 2014 NCAA All-American =

2014 NCAA All-American may refer to:

- 2014 NCAA Men's Basketball All-Americans
- 2014 College Baseball All-America Team
- 2014 College Football All-America Team
