= 2014 UC Irvine Anteaters baseball team =

American college baseball season

2014 UC Irvine Anteaters baseball

College World Series, 1–2
- Conference: Big West Conference
- Record: 41–25 (15–9 Big West)
- Head coach: Mike Gillespie (7th season)
- Assistant coaches: Ben Orloff (1st season); Bob Macaluso (4th season); Danny Bibona (1st season)
- Home stadium: Cicerone Field

2014 Big West Conference baseball standings
	Conf.						Overall
Team	W		L		T	PCT	W		L		T	PCT
No. 19 Cal Poly ‍†‍‍^{y}	19	–	5	–	0	.792	48	–	11	–	0	.814
Long Beach State ‍‍‍^{y}	17	–	7	–	0	.708	34	–	26	–	0	.567
No. 6 UC Irvine ‍‍‍^{y}	15	–	9	–	0	.625	41	–	25	–	0	.621
No. 29 Cal State Fullerton ^{y} ‍‍‍	14	–	10	–	0	.583	34	–	24	–	0	.586
UC Santa Barbara ‍‍‍	12	–	12	–	0	.500	34	–	17	–	1	.663
UC Riverside ‍‍‍	12	–	12	–	0	.500	26	–	28	–	0	.481
UC Davis ‍‍‍	7	–	17	–	0	.292	23	–	31	–	0	.426
Hawaii ‍‍‍	6	–	18	–	0	.250	22	–	31	–	0	.415
Cal State Northridge ‍‍‍	6	–	18	–	0	.250	18	–	38	–	0	.321
† – Conference champion y – Invited to the NCAA tournament Rankings from Collegiate Baseball

The 2014 UC Irvine Anteaters baseball team represented the University of California, Irvine in the 2014 NCAA Division I baseball season. The team played home games at Cicerone Field in Irvine, California. The team was coached by Mike Gillespie in his seventh season at Irvine.

== Personnel ==
=== Roster ===
2014 UC Irvine Anteaters roster
Pitchers: 4 - Mitch Merten - (redshirt) Senior; 9 - Sam Moore - Junior; 13 - Andrew Morales - Senior; 14 - Matt Fielding - (redshirt) Junior; 16 - Jimmy Litchfield - Senior; 17 - Michael Miller - (redshirt) Sophomore; 18 - Jordan Scheftz - Freshman; 21 - Evan Manarino - Junior; 23 - Michael Martin - Freshman; 32 - Elliot Surrey - Sophomore; 34 - Evan Brock - (redshirt) Senior; 38 - Kyle Davis - (redshirt) Sophomore; 39 - Chris Vargas - Freshman; 40 - Sean Sparling - Freshman; 44 - Max Weinstein - Freshman	Catchers: 5 - Alex Guenette - Freshman; 11 - Jerry McClanahan - (redshirt) Junior; 31 - Renae Martinez - (redshirt) Freshman; 42 - Raul Silva-Martinez - Junior; 55 - Edgar Ruvalcaba - Freshman; Infielders: 1 - Mikey Duarte - Sophomore; 2 - Justin Castro - (redshirt) Junior; 15 - Jonathan Munoz - (redshirt) Sophomore; 20 - John Brontsema - Freshman; 22 - Chris Rabago - Junior; 25 - Taylor Sparks - Junior; 26 - Andrew Martinez - (redshirt) Freshman; 27 - Grant Palmer - Sophomore; 33 - Connor Spencer - Junior	Outfielders: 7 - Ryan Cooper - Junior; 8 - Evan Cassolato - (redshirt) Freshman; 24 - Kris Paulino - Junior; 30 - Adam Alcantara - Freshman; 36 - Jonathan Herkins - Sophomore

=== Coaches ===
2014 UC Irvine Anteaters baseball coaching staff
- 19 - Mike Gillespie - Head coach - 7th year
- 6 - Ben Orloff - Assistant coach - 1st year
- 10 - Bob Macaluso - Assistant coach - 4th year
- 3 - Danny Bibona - Assistant coach - 1st year

== Schedule ==
2014 UC Irvine Anteaters baseball game log: 41–25
Regular season (35–22)

February (7–3)
Date	Opponent	Rank	Site/stadium	Score	Win	Loss	Save	Attendance	Overall record	Big West Record
Feb 14	Fresno State		Anteater Ballpark • Irvine, CA	L 0–2	Velazquez (1–0)	Moore (0–1)	Shull (1)	982	0–1	
Feb 15	Fresno State		Anteater Ballpark • Irivine, CA	L 7–8	Munro (1–0)	Martin (0–1)	None	765	0–2	
Feb 16	Fresno State		Anteater Ballpark • Irivine, CA	W 1–0	Brock (1–0)	Lambert (0–1)	Moore (1)	878	1–2	
Feb 19	Cal State Bakersfield		Anteater Ballpark • Irivine, CA	W 3–2	Manarino (1–0)	Aikenhead (1–1)	Moore (2)	537	2–2	
Feb 21	Wright State		Anteater Ballpark • Irivine, CA	L 1–3	Hissong (1–1)	Surrey (0–1)	None	445	2–3	
Feb 22	No. 21 Arizona State		Anteater Ballpark • Irivine, CA	W 5–2	Morales (1–0)	Kellogg (0–1)	Moore (3)	761	3–3	
Feb 23	Long Beach State		Anteater Ballpark • Irivine, CA	W 7–2	Brock (2–0)	Alexander (0–1)	Litchfield (1)	742	4–3	
Feb 25	Loyola Marymount		Anteater Ballpark • Irivine, CA	W 3–2	Litchfield (1–0)	Cohen (0–2)	None	441	5–3	
Feb 28	@ Portland		Joe Etzel Field • Portland, OR	W 5–1	Morales (2–0)	Radke (0–2)	None	351	6–3	
Feb 28	@ Portland		Joe Etzel Field • Portland, OR	W 6–2	Davis (1–0)	Kelly (1–1)	Moore (4)	351	7–3	

March (11–6)
Date	Opponent	Rank	Site/stadium	Score	Win	Loss	Save	Attendance	Overall record	Big West Record
Mar 1	@ Portland		Joe Etzel Field • Portland, OR	W 5–3	Brock (3–0)	Yinger (0–2)	Moore (5)	251	8–3	
Mar 4	Southern California		Anteater Ballpark • Irvine, CA	W 6–4	Davis (2–0)	Paschke (1–2)	Moore (6)	840	9–3	
Mar 8	Gonzaga		Anteater Ballpark • Irivine, CA	W 1–0	Moreales (3–0)	Jones (1–2)	Moore (7)	391	10–3	
Mar 9	Gonzaga		Anteater Ballpark • Irivine, CA	W 11–2	Surrey (1–1)	Bailey (0–3)	None	532	11–3	
Mar 10	Gonzaga	No. 25	Anteater Ballpark • Irivine, CA	W 3–1	Brock (4–0)	Sopko (1–1)	Moore (8)	429	12–3	
Mar 11	@ No. 24 UCLA	No. 25	Jackie Robinson Stadium • Los Angeles, CA	L 0–5	Dyer (2–2)	Manarino (1–1)	None	491	12–4	
Mar 14	@ Nebraska	No. 25	Haymarket Park • Lincoln, NE	W 7–6	Litchfield (2–0)	Kubat (0–1)	Moore (9)	3,424	13–4	
Mar 15	@ Nebraska	No. 25	Haymarket Park • Lincoln, NE	L 4–13	DeLeon (2–1)	Surrey (1–2)	None		13–5	
Mar 15	@ Nebraska	No. 25	Haymarket Park • Lincoln, NE	L 4–7	Hirsch (2–0)	Litchfield (2–1)	Roeder (3)	5,001	13–6	
Mar 18	Pepperdine		Anteater Ballpark • Irivine, CA	L 0–6	Maurer (2–1)	Manarino (1–2)	None	381	13–7	
Mar 21	Grand Canyon		Anteater Ballpark • Irivine, CA	W 2–0	Morales (4–0)	Perez (1–5)	None	467	14–7	
Mar 22	Grand Canyon		Anteater Ballpark • Irivine, CA	W 4–0	Surrey (2–2)	Naderer (3–3)	None	455	15–7	
Mar 23	Grand Canyon		Anteater Ballpark • Irivine, CA	L 1–9	Bruns (4–0)	Brock (4–1)	None	522	15–8	
Mar 25	Cal State Bakersfield		Anteater Ballpark • Irivine, CA	W 7–4	Litchfield (3–1)	Carter (0–2)	Moore (10)	417	16–8	
Mar 28	UC Riverside		Anteater Ballpark • Irivine, CA	W 8–0	Morales (5–0)	Smigelski (3–3)	None	430	17–8	1–0
Mar 29	UC Riverside		Anteater Ballpark • Irivine, CA	W 4–2	Surrey (3–2)	Varela (3–1)	Moore (11)	432	18–8	2–0
Mar 30	UC Riverside		Anteater Ballpark • Irivine, CA	L 1–3	Doucette (2–2)	Brock (4–2)	Sprague (3)	624	18–9	2–1

April (11–5)
Date	Opponent	Rank	Site/stadium	Score	Win	Loss	Save	Attendance	Overall record	Big West Record
Apr 1	@ Pepperdine		Eddy D. Field Stadium • Malibu, CA	L 3–4	Maurer (3–1)	Manarino (1–3)	Karch (9)	334	18–10	
Apr 4	@ Hawaii		Les Murakami Stadium • Honolulu, HI	W 7–1	Morales (6–0)	Cooper (3–2)	None	3,269	19–10	3–1
Apr 5	@ Hawaii		Les Murakami Stadium • Honolulu, HI	W 3–2	Surrey (4–2)	Kuzminksy (3–3)	Moore (12)	3,931	20–10	4–1
Apr 6	@ Hawaii		Les Murakami Stadium • Honolulu, HI	W 15–8	Brock (5–2)	Arakawa (2–1)	Moore (13)	2,925	21–10	5–1
Apr 8	San Diego		Anteater Ballpark • Irvine, CA	L 3–6	Burdick (2–1)	Merten (0–1)	None	474	21–11	
Apr 11	Cal State Northridge		Anteater Ballpark • Irivine, CA	W 7–5	Morales (7–0)	Rutherford (2–3)	Moore (14)	722	22–11	6–1
Apr 12	Cal State Northridge		Anteater Ballpark • Irivine, CA	W 5–4	Surrey (5–2)	Keel (0–7)	Moore (15)	615	23–11	7–1
Apr 13	Cal State Northridge		Anteater Ballpark • Irivine, CA	W 10–2	Brock (6–2)	Salas (4–2)	None	538	24–11	8–1
Apr 15	@ Loyola Marymount	No. 21	George C. Page Stadium • Los Angeles, CA	L 2–7	Arriaga (3–2)	Merten (0–2)	None	223	24–12	
Apr 17	San Diego State	No. 21	Anteater Ballpark • Irivine, CA	L 1–3	Robards (4–3)	Moore (0–2)	Cederoth (14)	582	24–13	
Apr 18	San Diego State	No. 21	Anteater Ballpark • Irivine, CA	W 3–0	Surrey (6–2)	Derby (5–2)	Moore (16)	701	25–13	
Apr 19	San Diego State	No. 21	Anteater Ballpark • Irivine, CA	L 3–4	Seyler (6–3)	Brock (6–3)	Cederoth (15)	588	25–14	
Apr 26	@ UC Davis	No. 28	Dobbins Baseball Complex • Davis, CA	W 4–2	Fielding (1–0)	Stone (2–3)	Moore (17)		26–14	9–1
Apr 26	@ UC Davis	No. 28	Dobbins Baseball Complex • Davis, CA	W 4–1	Merten (1–2)	Jacobson (4–1)	Moore (18)	387	27–14	10–1
Apr 27	@ UC Davis	No. 28	Dobbins Baseball Complex • Davis, CA	W 3–1	Brock (7–3)	Wolf (3–4)	Moore (19)	375	28–14	11–1
Apr 29	@ Southern California	No. 20	Dedeaux Field • Los Angeles, CA	W 6–2	Fielding (2–0)	Paschke (2–3)	Litchfield (2)	303	29–14	

May (6–8)
Date	Opponent	Rank	Site/stadium	Score	Win	Loss	Save	Attendance	Overall record	Big West Record
May 2	UC Santa Barbara	No. 20	Anteater Ballpark • Irvine, CA	W 6–2	Morales (8–0)	Jacome (5–2)	Moore (20)	602	30–14	12–1
May 3	UC Santa Barbara	No. 20	Anteater Ballpark • Irivine, CA	W 3–2	Manarino (2–3)	Mahle (6–3)	Moore (21)	538	31–14	13–1
May 4	UC Santa Barbara	No. 20	Anteater Ballpark • Irivine, CA	W 8–0	Brock (8–3)	Bieber (2–3)	None	595	32–14	14–1
May 6	@ San Diego	No. 16	Fowler Park • San Diego, CA	W 16–11	Manarino (3–3)	Olson (0–2)	Moore (22)	532	33–14	
May 9	@ No. 11 Cal Poly	No. 16	Robin Baggett Stadium • San Luis Obispo, CA	W 3–2	Morales (9–0)	Imhof (8–4)	Moore (23)	2,582	34–14	15–1
May 10	@ No. 11 Cal Poly	No. 16	Robin Baggett Stadium • San Luis Obispo, CA	L 0–1	Calomeni (8–2	Surrey (6–3)	Reilly (9)	2,742	34–15	15–2
May 11	@ No. 11 Cal Poly	No. 16	Robin Baggett Stadium • San Luis Obispo, CA	L 3–10	Bloomquist (11–1)	Brock (8–4)	None	2,466	34–16	15–3
May 13	UCLA	No. 21	Anteater Ballpark • Irivine, CA	W 10–2	Merten (2–2)	Dyer (6–5)	None	1,013	35–16	
May 16	Cal State Fullerton	No. 21	Anteater Ballpark • Irivine, CA	L 1–9	Eshelman (7–3)	Morales (9–1)	None	1,839	35–17	15–4
May 17	Cal State Fullerton	No. 21	Anteater Ballpark • Irivine, CA	L 1–2	Bickford (5–3)	Litchfield (3–2)	Davis (5)	844	35–18	15–5
May 18	Cal State Fullerton	No. 21	Anteater Ballpark • Irivine, CA	L 3–4	Gauna (4–2)	Moore (0–3)	Davis (6)	802	35–19	15–6
May 22	@ Long Beach State		Blair Field • Long Beach, CA	L 2–3	Provencher (4–5)	Morales (9–2)	None	1,133	35–20	15–7
May 23	@ Long Beach State		Blair Field • Long Beach, CA	L 1–10	Frye (8–0)	Surrey (6–4)	None	1,824	35–21	15–8
May 24	@ Long Beach State		Blair Field • Long Beach, CA	L 1–2	Rosetta (3–1)	Brock (8–5)	Provencher (4)	1,605	35–22	15–9

Postseason (6–3)

NCAA tournament Corvallis Regional (3–1)
Date	Opponent	Rank	Site/stadium	Score	Win	Loss	Save	Attendance	Overall record	NCAAT record
May 30	(2) UNLV	(3)	Goss Stadium at Coleman Field • Corvallis, OR	W 10–3	Morales (10–2)	Richy (11–4)	None	2,813	36–22	1–0
May 31	(1) No. 2 Oregon State	(3)	Goss Stadium at Coleman Field • Corvallis, OR	W 14–2	Surrey (7–4)	Fry (11–2)	None	3,422	37–22	2–0
June 1	(1) No. 2 Oregon State	(3)	Goss Stadium at Coleman Field • Corvallis, OR	L 0–4	Schultz (7–2)	Brock (8–6)	None	3,386	37–23	2–1
June 2	(1) No. 2 Oregon State	(3)	Goss Stadium at Coleman Field • Corvallis, OR	W 4–2	Manarino (4–3)	Thompson (3–2)	Surrey (1)	3,435	38–23	3–1

NCAA tournament Stillwater Super Regional (2–0)
Date	Opponent	Rank	Site/stadium	Score	Win	Loss	Save	Attendance	Overall record	NCAAT record
June 6	No. 4 Oklahoma State	No. 14	Allie P. Reynolds Stadium • Stillwater, OK	W 8–4	Surrey (8–4)	Perrin (8–5)	Manarino (1)	3,701	39–23	4–1
June 7	No. 4 Oklahoma State	No. 14	Allie P. Reynolds Stadium • Stillwater, OK	W 1–0	Morales (11–2)	Wheeland (10–1)	None	3,676	40–23	5–1

College World Series (1–2)
Date	Opponent	Rank	Site/stadium	Score	Win	Loss	Save	Attendance	Overall record	CWS record
June 14	No. 6 Texas	No. 8	TD Ameritrade Park • Omaha, NE	W 3–1	Brock (9–6)	Thornhill (8–3)	None	23,796	41–23	1–0
June 16	No. 5 Vanderbilt	No. 8	TD Ameritrade Park • Omaha, NE	L 4–6	Buehler (12–2)	Surrey (8–5)	None	20,792	41–24	1–1
June 18	No. 6 Texas	No. 8	TD Ameritrade Park • Omaha, NE	L 0–1	Hollingsworth (4–0)	Manarino (4–4)	Duke (2)	24,337	41–25	1–2

== Ranking Movements ==
Ranking movements Legend: ██ Increase in ranking ██ Decrease in ranking — = Not ranked
	Week																		
Poll	Pre	1	2	3	4	5	6	7	8	9	10	11	12	13	14	15	16	17	Final
Coaches'	—	—*		—	—	—	—	—	—	—	—	—	25	25	—	—			
Baseball America	—	—	—	—	—	—	—	—	—	—	—	—	23	24	—	—			
Collegiate Baseball^	—	—	—	—	25	—	—	—	—	21	28	20	16	21	—	—	14	8	
NCBWA†	—	—	—	—	—	—	—	—	—	—	—	—	25	27	—	—	15		

^ Collegiate Baseball ranked 40 teams in their preseason poll, but only ranked 30 teams weekly during the season.
† NCBWA ranks 30 teams in their preseason poll, but only ranks 25 teams weekly during the season.
* A new poll was not released for this week, so for comparison purposes, the previous week's ranking is inserted in this week's slot.
