= 2014 UCLA Bruins baseball team =

American college baseball season

2014 UCLA Bruins baseball
- Conference: Pac-12 Conference
- Record: 25-30-1 (12-18 Pac-12)
- Head coach: John Savage (10th season)
- Assistant coaches: Jake Silverman (4th season); T. J. Bruce (4th season); Rex Peters (3rd season)
- Home stadium: Jackie Robinson Stadium

2014 Pac-12 Conference baseball standings
	Conf.						Overall
Team	W		L		T	PCT	W		L		T	PCT
No. 17 Oregon State ‍†‍‍^{y}	23	–	7	–	0	.767	45	–	14	–	0	.763
No. 22 Washington ‍‍‍^{y}	21	–	9	–	0	.700	41	–	17	–	1	.703
Arizona State ‍‍‍^{y}	19	–	11	–	0	.633	33	–	24	–	0	.579
No. 27 Oregon ‍‍‍^{y}	18	–	12	–	0	.600	44	–	20	–	0	.688
No. 15 Stanford ‍‍‍^{y}	16	–	14	–	0	.533	35	–	26	–	0	.574
Southern California ‍‍‍	16	–	14	–	0	.533	29	–	24	–	0	.547
Washington State ‍‍‍	14	–	16	–	0	.467	24	–	30	–	0	.444
California ‍‍‍	13	–	17	–	0	.433	26	–	27	–	0	.491
UCLA ‍‍‍	12	–	18	–	0	.400	25	–	30	–	1	.455
Arizona ‍‍‍	9	–	21	–	0	.300	22	–	33	–	0	.400
Utah ‍‍‍	4	–	26	–	0	.133	16	–	36	–	0	.308
† – Conference champion y – Invited to the NCAA tournament Rankings from Collegiate Baseball

The 2014 UCLA Bruins baseball team represented the University of California, Los Angeles in the 2014 NCAA Division I baseball season. The Bruins competed in the Pac-12 Conference, and played their home games in Jackie Robinson Stadium. John Savage was in his tenth season as head coach. The Bruins were coming off a season in which they swept through the NCAA tournament's Los Angeles Regional, Fullerton Super Regional, and College World Series bracket to reach the final against Mississippi State, their second appearance in four years. The Bruins swept the Bulldogs in a best of three series to win their first NCAA National Championship in baseball.

== Roster ==
2014 UCLA Bruins baseball team
Players
Coaches

#	Pos.	Name	B/T	Height	Weight	Year	Previous school	Home town
26	RHP	David Berg	R/R	6 ft 0 in (1.83 m)	194 lb (88 kg)	Jr	Bishop Amat HS	Covina, CA
3	OF	Christoph Bono	L/R	6 ft 1 in (1.85 m)	173 lb (78 kg)	RS So	Palo Alto HS	Palo Alto, CA
10	RHP	Scott Burke	R/R	6 ft 3 in (1.91 m)	185 lb (84 kg)	Fr	Glendora HS	Glendora, CA
24	OF	Brian Carroll	R/R	5 ft 10 in (1.78 m)	178 lb (81 kg)	Sr	Granite Hills HS	San Diego, CA
40	RHP	Moises Ceja	R/R	6 ft 0 in (1.83 m)	168 lb (76 kg)	Fr	Kennedy HS	Arleta, CA
8	INF	Trent Chatterton	R/R	5 ft 8 in (1.73 m)	168 lb (76 kg)	So	Pacifica HS	Garden Grove, CA
32	RHP	Grant Dyer	R/R	6 ft 1 in (1.85 m)	183 lb (83 kg)	Fr	Dana Hills HS	Laguna Niguel, CA
30	RHP	Jake Ehret	R/R	6 ft 3 in (1.91 m)	201 lb (91 kg)	RS So	San Dimas HS	San Dimas, CA
4	OF	Eric Filia	L/R	6 ft 0 in (1.83 m)	175 lb (79 kg)	Jr	Edison HS	Huntington Beach, CA
48	RHP	Tucker Forbes	R/R	6 ft 9 in (2.06 m)	220 lb (100 kg)	RS Fr	Stevenson School	Pebble Beach, CA
27	INF	Pat Gallagher	L/R	6 ft 2 in (1.88 m)	230 lb (104 kg)	Sr	Reno HS	Reno, NV
28	C	Justin Hazard	L/R	6 ft 2 in (1.88 m)	187 lb (85 kg)	RS So	Beckman HS	Tustin, CA
11	RHP	James Kaprielian	R/R	6 ft 4 in (1.93 m)	200 lb (91 kg)	So	Beckman HS	Tustin, CA
25	INF	Chris Keck	L/R	6 ft 2 in (1.88 m)	188 lb (85 kg)	Jr	Amador Valley HS	Pleasanton, CA
16	RHP	Nick Kern	R/R	5 ft 11 in (1.8 m)	186 lb (84 kg)	RS Fr	Brea Olinda HS	Brea, CA
7	INF	Kevin Kramer	L/R	6 ft 0 in (1.83 m)	194 lb (88 kg)	Jr	Turlock HS	Turlock, CA
31	C	Darrell Miller, Jr.	R/R	6 ft 2 in (1.88 m)	221 lb (100 kg)	So	Servite HS	Yorba Linda, CA
20	C	Dominic Miroglio	R/R	6 ft 0 in (1.83 m)	195 lb (88 kg)	Fr	Bishop O'Dowd HS	Oakland, CA
29	OF	Ty Moore	L/R	6 ft 0 in (1.83 m)	190 lb (86 kg)	So	Mater Dei HS	Mission Viejo, CA
21	INF	Luke Persico	R/R	6 ft 3 in (1.91 m)	173 lb (78 kg)	Fr	Great Oak HS	Stevenson Ranch, CA
18	OF	Kort Peterson	L/R	6 ft 1 in (1.85 m)	195 lb (88 kg)	Fr	St. Francis HS	Mountain View, CA
41	C	Keenan Pierandozzi-Howes	R/R	6 ft 0 in (1.83 m)	210 lb (95 kg)	RS Fr	Pacifica Christian HS	Santa Monica, CA
34	RHP	Cody Poteet	R/R	6 ft 1 in (1.85 m)	188 lb (85 kg)	So	Christian HS	Bonita, CA
35	RHP	Chase Radan	R/R	6 ft 4 in (1.93 m)	183 lb (83 kg)	RS Fr	Mater Dei HS	Tustin, CA
1	OF	Andrew Schmidt	L/L	6 ft 1 in (1.85 m)	165 lb (75 kg)	Fr	Regis Jesuit HS	Parker, CO
45	LHP	Max Schuh	L/L	6 ft 4 in (1.93 m)	210 lb (95 kg)	RS Jr	Edison HS	Fresno, CA
38	OF	Tyler Scott	R/R	6 ft 2 in (1.88 m)	212 lb (96 kg)	RS So	Marin Catholic HS	Novato, CA
23	OF	Brett Stephens	L/R	6 ft 0 in (1.83 m)	187 lb (85 kg)	Fr	Campolindo HS	Moraga, CA
44	INF	Brett Urabe	S/R	5 ft 10 in (1.78 m)	165 lb (75 kg)	So	Huntington Beach HS	Huntington Beach, CA
33	LHP	Hunter Virant	R/L	6 ft 4 in (1.93 m)	171 lb (78 kg)	So	Camarillo HS	Camarillo, CA
12	LHP	Grant Watson	L/L	6 ft 0 in (1.83 m)	181 lb (82 kg)	Jr	Centennial HS	Bakersfield, CA
47	C	Aaron Weimer	L/R	5 ft 11 in (1.8 m)	188 lb (85 kg)	RS Sr	Bullard HS	Fresno, CA
5	INF	Kevin Williams	L/R	6 ft 0 in (1.83 m)	195 lb (88 kg)	Sr	Crespi HS	Van Nuys, CA
9	C	Shane Zeile	R/R	6 ft 1 in (1.85 m)	191 lb (87 kg)	Jr	Valencia HS	Valencia, CA

Head coach

John Savage

Assistant coach(es)

Rex Peters
T.J. Bruce
Jake Silverman

Legend

- (C) Team captain
- (S) Suspended
- (I) Ineligible
- Injured
- Current redshirt

Roster
Last update: March 2, 2014

== Schedule ==
2014 UCLA Bruins baseball game log
Regular season
February

Date	Opponent	Site/stadium	Score	Win	Loss	Save	Attendance	Overall record	Pac-12 record
Feb 14	Portland	Jackie Robinson Stadium • Los Angeles, CA	0–1	Lockwood (1–0)	Kaprielian (0–1)	Feldtman (1)	925	0–1	
Feb 15	Portland	Jackie Robinson Stadium • Los Angeles, CA	12–1	Watson (1–0)	Watts (0–1)	None	707	1–1	
Feb 16	Portland	Jackie Robinson Stadium • Los Angeles, CA	4-3 (11)	Berg (1–0)	Feldtman (0–1)	None	801	2–1	
Feb 18	Cal State Northridge	Jackie Robinson Stadium • Los Angeles, CA	7–1	Dyer (1–0)	Copping (0–1)	Berg (1)	523	3–1	
Feb 21	#22 Cal Poly	Jackie Robinson Stadium • Los Angeles, CA	5-2	Kaprielian (1–1)	Imhof (1-1)	None	765	4–1	
Feb 22	#22 Cal Poly	Jackie Robinson Stadium • Los Angeles, CA	0-8	Lee (2-0)	Watson (1–1)	None	1,465	4–2	
Feb 23	#22 Cal Poly	Jackie Robinson Stadium • Los Angeles, CA	1-9	Bloomquist (2-0)	Poteet (0–1)	None	842	4-3	
Feb 25	UC Santa Barbara	Jackie Robinson Stadium • Los Angeles, CA	4-6	Mazza (1-0)	Dyer (1–1)	Tate (2)	485	4-4	
Feb 28	Notre Dame	Coleman Field • Cary, NC (Notre Dame Classic)	2-1	Kaprielian (2–1)	Fitzgerald (2-1)	Berg (2)	292	5-4	

March

Date	Opponent	Site/stadium	Score	Win	Loss	Save	Attendance	Overall record	Pac-12 record
Mar 1	#6 North Carolina State	Coleman Field • Cary, NC (Notre Dame Classic)	2–0	Watson (2–1)	Rodon (1–2)	Berg (3)	2,120	6–4	
Mar 2	Michigan	Coleman Field • Cary, NC (Notre Dame Classic)	5–0	Poteet (1–1)	Hill (0–1)	None	315	7–4	
Mar 4	Loyola Marymount	Jackie Robinson Stadium • Los Angeles, CA	1-6	McGrath (1-0)	Dyer (1-2)	None	409	7-5	
Mar 7	Pepperdine	Jackie Robinson Stadium • Los Angeles, CA	7-8	Miller (2-1)	Kaprielian (2-2)	Karch (3)	647	7-6	
Mar 8	Houston	Jackie Robinson Stadium • Los Angeles, CA	3-4	Lemoine (2-1)	Schuh (0-1)	Wellbrock (4)	701	7-7	
Mar 9	@ USC	Dedeaux Field • Los Angeles, CA	6-5	Berg (2-0)	Nootbaar (0-1)	None	2,259	8-7	
Mar 11	UC Irvine	Jackie Robinson Stadium • Los Angeles, CA	5-0	Dyer (2-2)	Manarino (1-1)	None	491	9-7	
Mar 14	@ California	Evans Diamond • Berkeley, CA	3-2	Kaprielian (3-2)	Hildenberger (0-1)	Berg (4)	775	10-7	1-0
Mar 15	@ California	Evans Diamond • Berkeley, CA	3-1	Watson (3-1)	Porter (2-1)	Berg (5)	1,081	11-7	2-0
Mar 16	@ California	Evans Diamond • Berkeley, CA	6-1	Poteet (2-1)	Theofanopoul (2-2)	None	1,542	12-7	3-0
Mar 21	Washington State	Jackie Robinson Stadium • Los Angeles, CA	0-2	Monda (1-1)	Kaprielian (3-3)	Hamilton (7)	471	12-8	3-1
Mar 22	Washington State	Jackie Robinson Stadium • Los Angeles, CA	4-2	Watson (4-1)	Pistorese (1-1)	Berg (6)	702	13-8	4-1
Mar 23	Washington State	Jackie Robinson Stadium • Los Angeles, CA	8-7 (10)	Berg (3-0)	Hamilton (2-2)	None	881	14-8	5-1
Mar 25	Long Beach State	Jackie Robinson Stadium • Los Angeles, CA	2-1	Dyer (3-2)	Marshall (1-2)	Berg (7)	517	15-8	5-1
Mar 28	Arizona State	Jackie Robinson Stadium • Los Angeles, CA	7-3	Kaprielian (4-3)	Lilek (3-2)	None	774	16-8	6-1
Mar 29	Arizona State	Jackie Robinson Stadium • Los Angeles, CA	5-8	Kellogg (3-2)	Watson (4-2)	Burr (6)	827	16-9	6-2
Mar 30	Arizona State	Jackie Robinson Stadium • Los Angeles, CA	5-6 (10)	Burr (2-2)	Berg (3-1)	None	1,201	16-10	6-3

April

Date	Opponent	Site/stadium	Score	Win	Loss	Save	Attendance	Overall record	Pac-12 record
Apr 1	@ Loyola Marymount	George C. Page Stadium • Los Angeles, CA	5-3	Dyer (4-2)	Peabody (3-1)	Berg (8)	327	17-10	6-3
Apr 4	@ Long Beach State	Blair Field • Long Beach, CA	1-0 (11)	Kern (1-0)	Provencher (4-5)	Berg (9)	1,586	18-10	6-3
Apr 5	Long Beach State	Jackie Robinson Stadium • Los Angeles, CA	0-4	Frye (1-0)	Watson (4-3)	Millison (1)	969	18-11	6-3
Apr 6	@ Long Beach State	Blair Field • Long Beach, CA	5-8	Rosetta (1-0)	Poteet (2-2)	Lombana (1)	2,582	18-12	6-3
Apr 8	@ Cal State Fullerton	Goodwin Field • Fullerton, CA	3-4	Chambers (2-0)	Dyer (4-3)	Davis (4)	2,751	18-13	6-3
Apr 11	@ Arizona	Hi Corbett Field • Tucson, AZ	8-0	Kaprielian (5-3)	Farris (4-4)	None	3,406	19-13	7-3
Apr 12	@ Arizona	Hi Corbett Field • Tucson, AZ	2-3	Hamlin (5-2)	Watson (4-4)	None	2,769	19-14	7-4
Apr 13	@ Arizona	Hi Corbett Field • Tucson, AZ	5-6	Dalbec (2-2)	Burke (0-1)	None	2,597	19-15	7-5
Apr 17	@ Utah	Smith's Ballpark • Salt Lake City, UT	3-1	Dyer (5-3)	Green (1-3)	Kern (1)	918	20-15	8-5
Apr 18	@ Utah	Smith's Ballpark • Salt Lake City, UT	6-8	Watrous (2-4)	Watson (4-5)	Green (6)	1,768	20-16	8-6
Apr 19	@ Utah	Smith's Ballpark • Salt Lake City, UT	7-3	Poteet (3-2)	Adams (0-2)	None	1,125	21-16	9-6
Apr 22	Loyola Marymount	Jackie Robinson Stadium • Los Angeles, CA	3-0	Dyer (6-3)	Arriaga (3-3)	Kern (2)	508	22-16	9-6
Apr 24	USC	Jackie Robinson Stadium • Los Angeles, CA	0-10	Strahan (4-3)	Kaprielian (5-4)	None	870	22-17	9-7
Apr 25	USC	Jackie Robinson Stadium • Los Angeles, CA	2-3	Wheatley (4-1)	Watson (4-6)	Davis (6)	1,319	22-18	9-8
Apr 26	USC	Jackie Robinson Stadium • Los Angeles, CA	4-7	Davis (2-3)	Kern (1-1)	None	1,166	22-19	9-9
Apr 29	@ UC Santa Barbara	Caesar Uyesaka Stadium • Santa Barbara, CA	5-5	None	None	None	320	22-19-1	9-9

May

Date	Opponent	Site/stadium	Score	Win	Loss	Save	Attendance	Overall record	Pac-12 record
May 2	Stanford	Jackie Robinson Stadium • Los Angeles, CA	7-2	Kaprielian (6-4)	Quantrill (3-5)	Kern (3)	956	23-19-1	10-9
May 3	Stanford	Jackie Robinson Stadium • Los Angeles, CA	0-5	Hochstatter (7-1)	Watson (4-7)	None	1,314	23-20-1	10-10
May 4	Stanford	Jackie Robinson Stadium • Los Angeles, CA	2-5	Vanegas, AJ (2-2)	Poteet (3-3)	None	1,127	23-21-1	10-11
May 6	Cal State Fullerton	Jackie Robinson Stadium • Los Angeles, CA	0-1	Bickford (4-3)	Dyer (6-4)	Gauna (4)	454	23-22-1	
May 9	@ Oregon State	Goss Stadium at Coleman Field • Corvallis, OR	2-4	Wetzler (9-1)	Kaprielian (6-4)	Schultz (5)	2813	23-23-1	10-12
May 10	@ Oregon State	Goss Stadium at Coleman Field • Corvallis, OR	3-9	Moore (5-3)	Watson (4-8)	None	3056	23-24-1	10-13
May 11	@ Oregon State	Goss Stadium at Coleman Field • Corvallis, OR	2-11	Fry (10-1)	Poteet (3-4)	None	3209	23-25-1	10-14
May 13	@ UC Irvine	Cicerone Field • Irvine, CA	2-10	Mertin (2-2)	Dyer (6-5)	None	1013	23-26-1	10-14
May 16	Oregon	Jackie Robinson Stadium • Los Angeles, CA	1-2	Thorpe (9-4)	Kaprielian (6-6)	Reed (12)	851	23-27-1	10-15
May 17	Oregon	Jackie Robinson Stadium • Los Angeles, CA	1-4	Gold (10-1)	Watson (4-9)	Reed (13)	1185	23-28-1	10-16
May 18	Oregon	Jackie Robinson Stadium • Los Angeles, CA	4-5 (11)	Cleavinger (3-1)	Berg (3-2)	None	1323	23-29-1	10-17
May 23	@ Washington	Husky Ballpark • Seattle, WA	3-0	Kaprielian (7-6)	Fisher (6-4)	Berg (10)	1332	24-29-1	11-17
May 24	@ Washington	Husky Ballpark • Seattle, WA	6-3	Ehret (1-0)	Rallings (5-1)	Berg (11)	1703	25-29-1	12-17
May 25	@ Washington	Husky Ballpark • Seattle, WA	1-6	Brigham (7-3)	Poteet (3-5)	None	1390	25-30-1	12-18

== Ranking movements ==
Ranking movements Legend: ██ Increase in ranking ██ Decrease in ranking — = Not ranked
	Week																		
Poll	Pre	1	2	3	4	5	6	7	8	9	10	11	12	13	14	15	16	17	Final
Coaches'	10	10*	10	11	22	17	15	17	22	—	—	—	—	—	—	—	—	—	—
Baseball America	12	12	19	13	25	22	18	21	—	—	—	—	—	—	—	—	—	—	—
Collegiate Baseball^	15	14	20	16	24	23	23	26	29	—	—	—	—	—	—	—	—	—	—
NCBWA†	9	10	13	9	15	14	14	17	22	27	27	—	—	—	—	—	—	—	—

^ Collegiate Baseball ranked 40 teams in their preseason poll, but only ranked 30 teams weekly during the season.
† NCBWA ranks 30 teams in their preseason poll, but only ranks 25 teams weekly during the season.
* A new poll was not released for this week, so for comparison purposes, the previous week's ranking is inserted in this week's slot.
