= 2014 Arizona Wildcats baseball team =

2014 Arizona Wildcats baseball
- Conference: Pac-12 Conference
- Record: 22–33 (9–21 Pac-12)
- Head coach: Andy Lopez (13th season)
- Assistant coaches: Shaun Cole (5th season); Matt Siegel (3rd season); Bobby Rinard (1st season)
- Home stadium: Hi Corbett Field

The 2014 Arizona Wildcats baseball team represented the University of Arizona in the 2014 NCAA Division I baseball season. The Wildcats played their home games for the 3rd season at Hi Corbett Field. The team was coached by Andy Lopez in his 13th season at Arizona.

== Personnel ==
=== Roster ===
2014 Pac-12 Conference baseball standings
	Conf.						Overall
Team	W		L		T	PCT	W		L		T	PCT
No. 17 Oregon State ‍†‍‍^{y}	23	–	7	–	0	.767	45	–	14	–	0	.763
No. 22 Washington ‍‍‍^{y}	21	–	9	–	0	.700	41	–	17	–	1	.703
Arizona State ‍‍‍^{y}	19	–	11	–	0	.633	33	–	24	–	0	.579
No. 27 Oregon ‍‍‍^{y}	18	–	12	–	0	.600	44	–	20	–	0	.688
No. 15 Stanford ‍‍‍^{y}	16	–	14	–	0	.533	35	–	26	–	0	.574
Southern California ‍‍‍	16	–	14	–	0	.533	29	–	24	–	0	.547
Washington State ‍‍‍	14	–	16	–	0	.467	24	–	30	–	0	.444
California ‍‍‍	13	–	17	–	0	.433	26	–	27	–	0	.491
UCLA ‍‍‍	12	–	18	–	0	.400	25	–	30	–	1	.455
Arizona ‍‍‍	9	–	21	–	0	.300	22	–	33	–	0	.400
Utah ‍‍‍	4	–	26	–	0	.133	16	–	36	–	0	.308
† – Conference champion y – Invited to the NCAA tournament Rankings from Collegiate Baseball

2014 Arizona Wildcats roster
Pitchers • 19 – Tyger Talley – Sophomore • 22 – Morgan Earman – Freshman • 26 – Cody Hamlin – Sophomore • 27 – Evan Herbert – Freshman • 30 – Tyler Crawford – Junior • 33 – Austin Schnabel – Freshman • 35 – Nathan Bannister – Sophomore • 36 – James Farris – Senior • 37 – Cody Moffett – Sophomore • 40 – Luke Soroko – Freshman • 44 – Mathew Troupe – Junior • 49 – Xavier Borde – RS Sophomore	Catchers • 6 – Riley Moore – Junior • 21 – David Real – Sophomore • 29 – Jordan Berger – Junior • 29 – Nathan Zavos – RS Junior Infielders • 2 – Kevin Newman – Sophomore • 3 – Bobby Dalbec – Freshman • 4 – Trent Gilbert – Junior • 11 – Willie Calhoun – Freshman • 13 – Cody Ramer – Sophomore • 14 – Casey Bowman – Freshman • 17 – Jackson Willeford – Sophomore • 31 – Michael Hoard – Freshman	Outfielders • 10 – Tyler Krause – Junior • 12 – Kenny Meimerstorf – Freshman • 15 – Joseph Maggi – Junior • 23 – Zach Gibbons – Sophomore • 24 – Tyler Parmenter – Junior • 25 – Scott Kingery – Sophomore • 34 – Nick Kanavas – Freshman • 42 – Jared Oliva – Freshman

=== Coaches ===
2014 Arizona Wildcats baseball coaching staff
- Andy Lopez – Head coach
- Shaun Cole – Assistant coach
- Matt Siegel – Assistant coach
- Bobby Rinard – Volunteer Assistant Coach

=== Opening day ===
Opening Day Starters
Name	Position
Kevin Newman	Shortstop
Willie Calhoun	Designated hitter
Trent Gilbert	Second baseman
Zach Gibbons	Left fielder
Riley Moore	Catcher
Bobby Dalbec	First baseman
Scott Kingery	Right fielder
Cody Ramer	Third baseman
Joseph Maggi	Center fielder
James Farris	Starting pitcher

== Schedule and results ==
2014 Arizona Wildcats baseball game log
Regular season
Date	Opponent	Rank	Site/Stadium	Score	Win	Loss	Save	Overall Record	Pac-12 Record
Feb 14	vs Kent State		Hi Corbett Field • Tucson, AZ	W 13–1	Farris (1–0)	Clark (0–1)	None	1–0	
Feb 15	vs Kent State		Hi Corbett Field • Tucson, AZ	L 5–14	Lauer (1–0)	Crawford (0–1)	None	1–1	
Feb 16	vs Kent State		Hi Corbett Field • Tucson, AZ	W 13–9	Hamlin (1–0)	Clark (0–1)	None	2–1	
Feb 18	vs Utah Valley		Hi Corbett Field • Tucson, AZ	W 8–7	Earman (1–0)	Poole (0–1)	None	3–1	
Feb 19	vs Utah Valley		Hi Corbett Field • Tucson, AZ	L 2–5	Michaud (1–0)	Parmenter (0–1)	None	3–2	
Feb 22	vs Alcorn State		Hi Corbett Field • Tucson, AZ	W 6–0	Farris (2–0)	Fuentes (0–1)	None	4–2	
Feb 23	vs Alcorn State		Hi Corbett Field • Tucson, AZ	W 20–1	Hamlin (2–0)	Belmont (0–1)	None	5–2	
Feb 23	vs Alcorn State		Hi Corbett Field • Tucson, AZ	W 11–1	Crawford (1–1)	Corona (0–2)	None	6–2	
Feb 28	vs Seton Hall		Hi Corbett Field • Tucson, AZ	L 1–9	Prevost (3–0)	Farris (2–1)	None	6–3	
Mar 1	vs Seton Hall		Hi Corbett Field • Tucson, AZ	L 2–4	Burum (1–0)	Hamlin (2–1)	Krauss (2)	6–4	
Mar 2	vs Seton Hall		Hi Corbett Field • Tucson, AZ	L 2–11	Cahill (2–1)	Earman (1–1)	None	6–5	
Mar 4	vs Long Beach State		Hi Corbett Field • Tucson, AZ	L 2–3	Provencher (2–2)	Dalbec (0–1)	Friedrichs (3)	6–6	
Mar 5	vs Long Beach State		Hi Corbett Field • Tucson, AZ	L 4–11	Marshall (1–0)	Crawford (1–2)	None	6–7	
Mar 7	vs Mississippi State		Hi Corbett Field • Tucson, AZ	W 12–3	Farris (3–1)	Woodruff (1–2)	None	7–7	
Mar 8	vs UC Santa Barbara		Hi Corbett Field • Tucson, AZ	W 10–5	Hamlin (3–1)	Mazza (1–1)	Dalbec (1)	8–7	
Mar 9	vs UC Santa Barbara		Hi Corbett Field • Tucson, AZ	L 2–10	Nesovic (1–0)	Crawford (1–3)	None	8–8	
Mar 9	vs Mississippi State		Hi Corbett Field • Tucson, AZ	L 4–6	Holder (1–1)	Schnabel (0–1)	Lindgren (2)	8–9	
Mar 11	vs Air Force		Hi Corbett Field • Tucson, AZ	W 14–2	Earman (2–1)	DeVries (0–1)	None	9–9	
Mar 12	vs Air Force		Hi Corbett Field • Tucson, AZ	W 10–2	Moffett (1–0)	Monaghan (0–1)	None	10–9	
Mar 14	vs Washington State		Hi Corbett Field • Tucson, AZ	W 12–1	Farris (4–1)	Monda (0–1)	None	11–9	1–0
Mar 15	vs Washington State		Hi Corbett Field • Tucson, AZ	L 5–6	Hamilton (2–1)	Dalbec (0–2)	None	11–10	1–1
Mar 16	vs Washington State		Hi Corbett Field • Tucson, AZ	L 2–3	Chleborad (1–2)	Schnabel (0–2)	Hamilton (4)	11–11	1–2
Mar 18	vs Grand Canyon		Hi Corbett Field • Tucson, AZ	L 1–3	Serigstad (1–1)	Parmenter (0–2)	Perez (1)	11–12	
Mar 22	at Washington		Husky Ballpark • Seattle, WA	L 7–8	Choate (1–0)	Moffett (1–1)	Rallings (2)	11–13	1–3
Mar 23	at Washington		Husky Ballpark • Seattle, WA	L 2–5	Davis (4–1)	Hamlin (3–2)	Rallings (3)	11–14	1–4
Mar 24	at Washington		Husky Ballpark • Seattle, WA	L 0–8	Brigham (4–0)	Schnabel (0–3)	None	11–15	1–5
Mar 26	at Arizona State		Packard Stadium • Tempe, AZ	L 6–14	Aboites (3–1)	Borde (0–1)	None	11–16	
Mar 28	vs #7 Oregon State		Hi Corbett Field • Tucson, AZ	L 2–11	Wetzler (5–0)	Farris (4–2)	None	11–17	1–6
Mar 29	vs #7 Oregon State		Hi Corbett Field • Tucson, AZ	W 11–2	Hamlin (4–2)	Moore (2–2)	None	12–17	2–6
Mar 30	vs #7 Oregon State		Hi Corbett Field • Tucson, AZ	L 0–11	Fry (5–1)	Schnabel (0–4)	None	12–18	2–7
Apr 4	at Utah		Smith's Ballpark • Salt Lake City, UT	L 3–7	Banks (2–5)	Farris (4–3)	None	12–19	2–8
Apr 5	at Utah		Smith's Ballpark • Salt Lake City, UT	W 6–1	Dalbec (1–2)	Green (0–2)	Moffett (1)	13–19	3–8
Apr 6	at Utah		Smith's Ballpark • Salt Lake City, UT	W 5–2	Talley (1–0)	Helton (2–3)	Moffett (2)	14–19	4–8
Apr 9	at Arizona State		Packard Stadium • Tempe, AZ	W 10–9	Herbert (1–0)	Aboites (3–2)	Dalbec (2)	15–19	
Apr 11	vs #22 UCLA		Hi Corbett Field • Tucson, AZ	L 0–8	Kaprielian (5–3)	Farris (4–4)	None	15–20	4–9
Apr 12	vs #22 UCLA		Hi Corbett Field • Tucson, AZ	W 3–2	Hamlin (5–2)	Watson (4–4)	None	16–20	5–9
Apr 13	vs #22 UCLA		Hi Corbett Field • Tucson, AZ	W 6–5	Dalbec (2–2)	Burke (0–1)	None	17–20	6–9
Apr 17	at USC		Dedeaux Field • Los Angeles, CA	L 0–1	Strahan (3–3)	Farris (4–5)	None	17–21	6–10
Apr 18	at USC		Dedeaux Field • Los Angeles, CA	L 4–5	Twomey (1–2)	Dalbec (2–3)	None	17–22	6–11
Apr 19	at USC		Dedeaux Field • Los Angeles, CA	L 0–2	Wheatley (3–3)	Talley (1–1)	Davis (4)	17–23	6–12
Apr 25	vs Arizona State		Hi Corbett Field • Tucson, AZ	L 1–2	Lilek (4–2)	Moffett (1–2)	Burr (9)	17–24	6–13
Apr 26	vs Arizona State		Hi Corbett Field • Tucson, AZ	L 0–7	Kellogg (6–2)	Hamlin (5–3)	None	17–25	6–14
Apr 27	vs Arizona State		Hi Corbett Field • Tucson, AZ	W 6–1	Moffett (2–2)	Gillies (1–4)	None	18–25	7–14
May 2	at Oregon		PK Park • Eugene, OR	L 1–6	Thorpe (7–4)	Farris (4–6)	None	18–26	7–15
May 3	at Oregon		PK Park • Eugene, OR	L 6–7	Reed (3–1)	Dalbec (2–4)	None	18–27	7–16
May 4	at Oregon		PK Park • Eugene, OR	L 1–5	Tessar (4–0)	Talley (1–2)	None	18–28	7–17
May 9	vs Stanford		Hi Corbett Field • Tucson, AZ	W 3–2	Dalbec (3–4)	Vanegas (2–3)	None	19–28	8–17
May 10	vs Stanford		Hi Corbett Field • Tucson, AZ	L 6–10	Hochstatter (8–1)	Hamlin (5–4)	None	19–29	8–18
May 11	vs Stanford		Hi Corbett Field • Tucson, AZ	L 3–5	James (2–2)	Talley (1–3)	Castellanos (2)	19–30	8–19
May 16	at California		Evans Diamond • Berkeley, CA	W 6–0	Farris (5–6)	Jefferies (2–7)	None	20–30	9–19
May 17	at California		Evans Diamond • Berkeley, CA	L 6–7	Talbot (1–0)	Dalbec (3–5)	None	20–31	9–20
May 18	at California		Evans Diamond • Berkeley, CA	L 4–6	Mason (6–1)	Talley (1–4)	Talbot (2)	20–32	9–21
May 23	vs Abilene Christian		Hi Corbett Field • Tucson, AZ	W 4–3	Farris (6–6)	Crippen (0–2)	None	21–32	
May 24	vs Abilene Christian		Hi Corbett Field • Tucson, AZ	L 5–6	deMeyere (5–8)	Hamlin (5–5)	Cole (2)	21–33	
May 25	vs Abilene Christian		Hi Corbett Field • Tucson, AZ	W 14–1	Talley (2–4)	Rodriguez (2–6)	None	22–33	

== 2014 MLB draft ==
Player	Position	Round	Overall	MLB team
James Farris	RHP	9	259	Chicago Cubs
Trent Gilbert	2B	15	462	Oakland Athletics
Tyler Parmenter	RHP	21	635	Cincinnati Reds
