= 2014 NCAA Division I baseball rankings =

2014 NCAA Division I baseball season
- Duration: February 13, 2014 – June 25, 2014
- Number of teams: 302
- Preseason No. 1: Cal State Fullerton (CB, Coaches, NCBWA); Virginia (BA)

Tournament
- Duration: May 30 – June 25, 2014

College World Series
- Champions: Vanderbilt (1st title)
- Runners-up: Virginia
- MOP: Dansby Swanson, Vanderbilt

Seasons
- ← 2013 2015 →

The following human polls make up the 2014 NCAA Division I men's baseball rankings. The USA Today/ESPN Coaches Poll is voted on by a panel of 31 Division I baseball coaches. The Baseball America poll is voted on by staff members of the Baseball America magazine. These polls rank the top 25 teams nationally. Collegiate Baseball and the National Collegiate Baseball Writers Association rank the top 30 teams nationally.

== Legend ==
	Increase in ranking
	Decrease in ranking
	Not ranked previous week
Italics	Number of first place votes
(#-#)	Win–loss record
т	Tied with team above or below also with this symbol

== ESPN/USA Today Coaches' Poll ==
	Preseason Jan 30	Week 3 Mar 3	Week 4 Mar 10	Week 5 Mar 17	Week 6 Mar 24	Week 7 Mar 31	Week 8 Apr 7	Week 9 Apr 14	Week 10 Apr 21	Week 11 Apr 28	Week 12 May 5	Week 13 May 12	Week 14 May 19	Week 15 May 26	Week 16 June 26	
1.	Cal State Fullerton 18	South Carolina 13 (10–0)	South Carolina 17 (15–0)	Florida State 14 (17–2)	Florida State 24 (19–4)	Virginia 13 (23–4)	Florida State 19 (26–5)	Virginia 28 (30–6)	Virginia 25 (33–7)	Virginia 26 (37–8)	Virginia 17 (37–9)	Virginia (41–9)	Oregon State 25 (41–9)	Louisiana–Lafayette 19 (53–7)	Vanderbilt 31 (51–21)	1.
2.	LSU 6	Florida State 7 (8–1)	Florida State 7 (12–2)	South Carolina 15 (18–1)	Virginia 5 (18–4)	Florida State 11 (22–5)	Virginia 10 (26–5)	Louisiana-Lafayette 1 (34–4)	Louisiana-Lafayette 1 (36–5)	Louisiana-Lafayette (39–6)	Oregon State 12 (34–8)	Oregon State (38–8)	Louisiana–Lafayette 4 (49–7)	Oregon State 8 (42–12)	Virginia (53–16)	2.
3.	Oregon State	Virginia 7 (9–2)	Vanderbilt 2 (15–2)	Vanderbilt 2 (18–3)	South Carolina 1 (19–3)	South Carolina 7 (24–3)	Louisiana-Lafayette 1 (30–3)	Oregon State 1 (27–7)	Cal Poly 4 (34–5)	Oregon State 3 (31–8)	Louisiana-Lafayette 1 (43–7)	Louisiana–Lafayette (46–7)	Virginia 2 (43–11)	Florida State (43–15)	Texas (46–21)	3.
4.	Mississippi State 4	Vanderbilt 2 (10–2)	Oregon State (14–3)	Oregon State (18–3)	LSU (20–4)	Vanderbilt (23–6)	South Carolina 1 (26–5)	Cal Poly 1 (30–5)	Oregon State 1 (27–7)	Florida State (33–11)	Florida State (36–11)	Florida State (39–12)	Cal Poly (45–10	Virginia 1 (44–13)	Ole Miss (48–21)	4.
5.	Florida State	Cal State Fullerton 1 (7–3)	Virginia 5 (11–3)	Virginia (15–3)	Vanderbilt (20–5)	Louisiana–Lafayette (26–3)	Oregon State (25–6)	Florida State (27–8)	Florida State (30–9)	Cal Poly (36–7)	Cal Poly (38–9)	Cal Poly (41–10)	Florida State (41–14	LSU 1 (44–14)	TCU (48–18)	5.
6.	Virginia	Oregon State (9–3)	LSU (14–2)	LSU (17–4)	Louisiana–Lafayette (22–2)	Oregon State (21–6)	Cal Poly (26–5)	South Carolina (28–7)	LSU (30–10–1)	LSU (33–11–1)	LSU (35–13)	Louisville (40–12)	South Carolina (42–14)	Cal Poly (45–10)	Louisville (50–17)	6.
7.	Oregon	LSU (9–2)	NC State (13–2)	Oregon (14–5)	Oregon State (19–5)	Cal Poly (23–4)	Vanderbilt (25–8)	LSU (27–9–1)	Oregon (31–10)	South Carolina (34–11)	Louisville (37–11)	Oklahoma State (38–13)	Louisville (43–13)	Oklahoma State (45–16)	UC Irvine (41–25)	7.
8.	Vanderbilt	NC State (9–2)	Cal State Fullerton (8–5)	Louisiana–Lafayette (17–2)	Oregon (17–5)	Louisville (21–6)	LSU (24–8–1)	Texas (29–8)	South Carolina (30–10)	Louisville (33–11)	Florida 1 (33–15)	South Carolina (39–13)	Oklahoma State (41–14)	Florida (40–21)	Texas Tech (45–21)	8.
9.	NC State	Oregon (8–3)	Oregon (11–4)	Louisville (15–4)	Ole Miss (21–4)	LSU (20–8)	Texas (26–7)	Louisville (27–8)	Washington (27–8–1)	Vanderbilt (33–12)	Oklahoma State (35–13)	Vanderbilt (38–14)	LSU (40–14–1)	Louisville (45–15)	Louisiana–Lafayette (58–10)	9.
10.	UCLA	Mississippi State (10–4)	Louisiana–Lafayette (13–2)	NC State (14–5)	Cal Poly (19–4)	Oregon (19–8)	Houston (25–6)	Ole Miss (29–9)	Texas (30–11)	Oklahoma State (31–13)	Vanderbilt (36–12)	LSU (36–14)	Vanderbilt (40–16)	TCU (42–15)	Oklahoma State (48–18)	10.
11.	Indiana	UCLA (7–4)	Louisville (10–4)	Cal Poly (17–3)	Rice (19–6)	Texas (22–7)	Louisville (23–8)	Oregon (27–10)	Rice (29–13)	Texas (32–13)	South Carolina (35–13)	Washington (36–11–1)	Miami (FL) (40–15)	Indiana (42–13)	Houston (48–18)	11.
12.	North Carolina	Oklahoma State (10–2)	Ole Miss (14–2)	North Carolina (14–5)	Cal State Fullerton (13–8)	Mississippi State (20–10)	Oregon (22–10)	Vanderbilt (27–10)	Florida (27–13)	Florida (30–15)	Oregon (34–13)	Miami (FL) (38–14)	Florida (37–19)	Rice (41–18)	Oregon State (45–14)	12.
13.	Louisville	Louisville (8–3) т	North Carolina (10–4)	Cal State Fullerton (10–7)	Louisville (17–6)	Houston (22–5)	Ole Miss (25–8)	Washington (24–7–1)	Ole Miss (30–11)	Washington (29–10–1)	Washington (32–11–1)	Florida (34–18)	Washington (38–13–1)	South Carolina (43–16)	Maryland (40–23)	13.
14.	South Carolina	Louisiana–Lafayette (10–2) т	Cal Poly (11–3)	Ole Miss (17–4)	Texas (19–6)	Rice (21–9)	Clemson (20–10)	Rice (26–12)	Vanderbilt (29–12)	Oregon (31–13) т	Ole Miss (35–14)	Ole Miss (37–15)	Ole Miss (40–16)	Vanderbilt (41–18)	Pepperdine (43–18)	14.
15.	Rice	Ole Miss (11–1)	Texas (13–4)	Rice (15–6)	UCLA (14–8)	Clemson (17–9)	Kentucky (22–10)	Houston (26–9)	Oklahoma State (29–11)	Miami (FL) (32–13) т	Miami (FL) (34–14)	Rice (34–16)	Oregon (40–16)	Houston (44–15)	Stanford (35–26)	15.
16.	Clemson	Cal Poly (8–2)	Oklahoma State (11–4)	Tennessee (17–2)	Mississippi State (17–9)	Ole Miss (21–8)	Alabama (22–9)	Oklahoma State (26–10)	Houston (29–10)	Ole Miss (33–12)	Rice (31–15)	Houston (39–13)	Rice (37–17)	Miami (FL) (41–17)	LSU (46–16)	16.
17.	Miami (FL)	North Carolina (7–3)	Tennessee (14–1)	UCLA (12–7)	Houston 1 (19–4)	Cal State Fullerton (14–10) т	Washington (22–6)	Miami (FL) (25–12)	Louisville (28–11)	Rice (31–15)	Texas (34–15)	Oregon (36–16)	Houston (41–14)	Ole Miss (41–18)	Indiana (45–15)	17.
18.	Oklahoma State	Texas (9–3)	Clemson (9–5)	Clemson (12–6)	North Carolina (15–8)	UCLA (16–10) т	Cal State Fullerton (16–11)	Florida (23–13)	Alabama (28–12)	Houston (31–12)	Houston (35–13)	Indiana (35–12)	Indiana (38–13)	Oregon (42–18)	Cal Poly (47–12)	18.
19.	Arizona State	Rice (7–5)	Rice (10–6) т	Mississippi State (15–8)	NC State (14–8) т	Kentucky (19–9)	Oklahoma State (22–10)	Alabama (24–11)	Miami (FL) (27–13)	Texas Tech (35–13)	TCU (34–13)	TCU (36–14)	TCU (38–15)	Washington (39–15–1)	College of Charleston (44–19)	19.
20.	Florida	Clemson (6–4)	Mississippi State (12–7) т	Texas (15–6)	Kentucky (17–7) т	Florida (19–9)	Rice (22–12)	Clemson (21–14)	Clemson (24–15)	Alabama (29–15)	Indiana (32–12)	Texas (34–15)	Texas (36–16)	Texas (38–18)	Kennesaw State (40–24)	20.
21.	Kansas State	Tennessee (10–0)	Kentucky (13–3)	San Diego (14–4)	Tennessee (19–4)	Alabama (19–8)	Mississippi State (20–13)	UC Santa Barbara (22–8)	Texas Tech (32–11)	TCU (30–13)	Mississippi State (31–18)	Mississippi State (33–19)	Texas Tech (40–16)	Mississippi State (37–22)	Florida State (43–17)	21.
22.	Texas	Kentucky (9–2)	UCLA (8–7)	Oklahoma State (14–6)	Clemson (14–9)	Washington (20–5)	UCLA (18–12)	Kentucky (23–13)	Mississippi State (26–15)	Indiana (28–12)	Alabama (30–18)	Alabama (32–19)	Mississippi State (35–20)	Nebraska (40–19)	South Carolina (44–28)	22.
23.	TCU	Miami (FL) (5–5)	Texas Tech (14–3)	Sam Houston State (16–4)	UC Santa Barbara (17–3)	Oklahoma State (19–9)	Tennessee (21–9)	Cal State Fullerton (18–13)	Kentucky (26–14)	Pepperdine (30–9)	Texas Tech (36–16)	Texas Tech (37–16)	Nebraska (37–18)	Texas Tech (40–18)	Miami (FL) (44–19)	23.
24.	Louisiana–Lafayette	Sam Houston State (10–2) т	Miami (FL) (10–5)	Houston (15–3)	Texas Tech (19–7)	UC Santa Barbara (19–5)	Miami (FL) (21–12)	Texas Tech (28–11)	Indiana (25–11)	Mississippi State (28–17)	Clemson (28–19) т	Liberty (38–11)	Sam Houston State (40–15)	Pepperdine (39–16)	Florida (40–23)	24.
25.	Stanford	Arkansas (7–2) т	San Diego (10–4)	Texas Tech (16–5)	VCU (20–3)	Texas Tech (22–9)	Florida (20–12)	Pepperdine (27–8)	Pepperdine (30–9)	Liberty (35–10)	UC Irvine (32–14) т / Liberty (35-10) т	UC Irvine (34–16)	Alabama (34–21)	Kentucky (35–23)	Rice (42–20)	25.
	Preseason Jan 30	Week 3 Mar 3	Week 4 Mar 10	Week 5 Mar 17	Week 6 Mar 24	Week 7 Mar 31	Week 8 Apr 7	Week 9 Apr 14	Week 10 Apr 21	Week 11 Apr 28	Week 12 May 5	Week 13 May 12	Week 14 May 19	Week 15 May 26	Week 16 June 26	
		Dropped: 11 Indiana; 19 Arizona State; 20 Florida; 21 Kansas State; 23 TCU; 25 Stanford	Dropped: 24 Sam Houston State; 24 Arkansas	Dropped: 21 Kentucky; 24 Miami (FL)	Dropped: 21 San Diego; 22 Oklahoma State; 23 Sam Houston State	Dropped: 18 North Carolina; 19 NC State; 21 Tennessee; 25 VCU	Dropped: 24 UC Santa Barbara; 25 Texas Tech	Dropped: 21 Mississippi State; 22 UCLA; 23 Tennessee	Dropped: 21 UC Santa Barbara; 23 Cal State Fullerton	Dropped: 20 Clemson; 23 Kentucky	Dropped: 23 Pepperdine	Dropped: 24 Clemson	Dropped: 24 Liberty; 25 UC Irvine	Dropped: 24 Sam Houston State; 25 Alabama	Dropped: 18 Oregon; 19 Washington; 21 Mississippi State; 22 Nebraska; 25 Kentucky	

== Baseball America ==
	Preseason Jan 27	Week 1 Feb 17	Week 2 Feb 24	Week 3 Mar 3	Week 4 Mar 10	Week 5 Mar 17	Week 6 Mar 24	Week 7 Mar 31	Week 8 Apr 7	Week 9 Apr 14	Week 10 Apr 21	Week 11 Apr 28	Week 12 May 5	Week 13 May 12	Week 14 May 19	Week 15 May 26	Week 16 June 26	
1.	Virginia	Virginia (2–1)	Virginia (6–1)	Virginia (9–2)	South Carolina (15–0)	South Carolina (18–1)	Florida State (19–4)	Florida State (22–5)	Florida State (26–5)	Virginia (30–6)	Virginia (33–7)	Virginia (37–8)	Virginia (37–9)	Virginia (41–9)	Oregon State (41–9)	Louisiana–Lafayette (53–7)	Vanderbilt (51–21)	1.
2.	Oregon State	Oregon State (3–0)	Florida State (6–0)	Florida State (8–1)	Florida State (12–2)	Florida State (17–2)	South Carolina (19–3)	South Carolina (24–3)	Virginia (27–5)	Louisiana-Lafayette (34–4)	Cal Poly (34–5)	Oregon State (31–8)	Oregon State (34–8)	Oregon State (38–8)	Louisiana–Lafayette (49–7)	Oregon State (42–12)	Virginia (53–16)	2.
3.	Indiana	Cal State Fullerton (2–1)	South Carolina (7–0)	South Carolina (10–0)	Virginia (11–3)	Virginia (15–3)	Virginia (18–4)	Virginia (23–4)	Louisiana–Lafayette (30–3)	Cal Poly (30–5)	Louisiana-Lafayette (36–5)	Louisiana-Lafayette (39–6)	Louisiana-Lafayette (43–7)	Louisiana–Lafayette (46–7)	Virginia (43–11)	Florida (40–21)	Ole Miss (48–21)	3.
4.	Cal State Fullerton	Florida State (3–0)	Oregon State (5–2)	Cal State Fullerton (7–3)	Oregon State (14–3)	Oregon State (18–3)	Louisiana–Lafayette (22–2)	Louisiana–Lafayette (26–3)	Cal Poly (26–5)	Florida State (27–8)	Florida State (30–9)	Cal Poly (36–7)	Florida (33–15)	Florida State (39–12)	Florida State (41–14)	Florida State (43–15)	Texas (46–21)	4.
5.	NC State	South Carolina (3–0)	Cal State Fullerton (4–3)	Oregon State (9–3)	NC State (13–2)	Louisiana–Lafayette (17–2)	Cal Poly (19–4)	Cal Poly (22–4)	South Carolina (26–5)	Oregon State (27–7)	Oregon State (27–7)	Florida (30–15)	Florida State (36–11)	Washington (36–11)	Cal Poly (45–10)	Cal Poly (45–10)	TCU (48–18)	5.
6.	Florida State	NC State (0–1)	NC State (5–1)	NC State (9–2)	Louisiana–Lafayette (13–2)	Vanderbilt (18–3)	Oregon State (19–4)	Oregon State (21–6)	Oregon State (25–6)	Texas 29–8)	Florida (27–13)	Florida State (33–11)	Washington (32–11)	Cal Poly (41–10)	Miami (FL) (40–15)	Indiana (42–13)	Louisville (50–17)	6.
7.	South Carolina	Mississippi State (2–1)	LSU (7–0)	Louisiana–Lafayette (10–2)	Vanderbilt (15–2)	Cal Poly (17–3)	Vanderbilt (20–5)	Vanderbilt (23–6)	Texas (26–7)	Washington (24–7)	Washington (27–8)	Washington (29–10)	Cal Poly (38–9)	Miami (FL) (38–14)	Florida (37–19)	LSU (44–14)	Louisiana–Lafayette (58–10)	7.
8.	Mississippi State	LSU (3–0)	Vanderbilt (7–0)	Vanderbilt (10–2)	LSU (14–2)	LSU (17–4)	LSU (20–4)	Texas (22–7)	Houston (25–6)	Alabama (24–11)	Alabama (28–12)	LSU (33–11)	Miami (FL) (34–14)	Florida (34–18)	Washington (38–13)	Virginia (44–13)	UC Irvine (41–25)	8.
9.	LSU	Vanderbilt (3–0)	Oregon (7–0)	LSU (9–2)	Cal State Fullerton (8–5)	Cal State Fullerton (10–7)	Cal State Fullerton (13–8)	Mississippi State (20–10)	Washington (22–6)	Florida (23–13)	LSU (30–10)	South Carolina (34–11)	Indiana (32–12)	Indiana (35–12)	Indiana (38–13)	TCU (42–15)	Texas Tech (45–21)	9.
10.	Vanderbilt	Indiana (1–3)	Louisiana–Lafayette (7–1)	Texas (9–3)	Texas (13–4)	NC State (14–5)	Rice (19–6)	Houston (22–5)	Alabama (22-9)	Louisville (27–8)	Texas (30–11)	Miami (FL) (32–13)	Louisville (37–11)	Louisville (40–12)	Ole Miss (40–16)	Oklahoma State (45–16)	Oklahoma State (48–18)	10.
11.	Oregon	Oregon (3–0)	Clemson (5–1)	Cal Poly (8–2)	Cal Poly (11–3)	Rice (15–6)	Oregon (17–5)	Louisville (21–6)	Vanderbilt (25–8)	South Carolina (28–7)	South Carolina (30–12)	Ole Miss (33–12)	Ole Miss (35–14)	Ole Miss (37–15)	Oklahoma State (41–14)	Miami (FL) (41–17)	Houston (48–18)	11.
12.	UCLA	UCLA (2–1)	Rice (6–2)	Mississippi State (10–4)	Oregon (12–4)	Oregon (14–5)	Texas (19–6)	Rice (21–9)	Kentucky (22–10)	LSU (27–9)	Rice (29–13)	Alabama (29–15)	TCU (34–13)	Oklahoma State (38–13)	Louisville (43–13)	Ole Miss (41–18)	Pepperdine (43–18)	12.
13.	Clemson	Clemson (2–1)	Cal Poly (6–1)	UCLA (7–4)	Miami (FL) (10–5)	Clemson (12–6)	Ole Miss (21–4)	Florida (19–9)	Louisville (23–8)	Ole Miss (29–9)	Louisville (28–11)	Louisville (33–11)	Oklahoma State (35–13)	TCU (36–14)	TCU (38–15)	Louisville (45–15)	Oregon State (45–14)	13.
14.	Louisiana–Lafayette	Louisiana–Lafayette (3–1)	Miami (FL) (4–3)	Oregon (8–3)	Clemson (9–5)	Louisville (15–4)	Louisville (17–6)	Washington (20–5)	Clemson (20–10)	Houston (26–9)	Houston (29–10)	Rice (31–15)	Rice (31–15)	Rice (34–16)	LSU (40–14)	Washington (39–15)	Maryland (40–23)	14.
15.	Rice	Rice (2–1)	Texas (5–3)	Clemson (6–4)	Rice (10–6)	Texas (15–6)	UC Santa Barbara (17–3)	Alabama (19–8)	Florida (20–12)	Miami (FL) (25–12)	Miami (FL) (27–13)	Indiana (28–12)	LSU (35–13)	LSU (36–14)	South Carolina (42–14)	Houston (44–15)	Stanford (35–26)	15.
16.	Miami (FL)	Miami (FL) (2–1)	TCU (6–1)	Miami (FL) (5–5)	Indiana (7–6)	Sam Houston State (16–4)	Mississippi State (17–9)	Clemson (17–9)	LSU (24–8)	Rice (26–12)	Ole Miss (30–11)	Houston (31–12)	Houston (35–13)	Houston (39–13)	Houston (41–14)	Rice (41–18)	Kennesaw State (40–24)	16.
17.	North Carolina	North Carolina (1–1)	Indiana (2–5)	Indiana (4–5)	Louisville (10–4)	North Carolina (14–5)	Houston (19–4)	UC Santa Barbara (19–5)	Mississippi State (20–13)	UC Santa Barbara (22–8)	Kentucky (26–14)	TCU (30–13)	South Carolina (35–13)	South Carolina (39–13)	Rice (37–17)	Mississippi State (37–22)	College of Charleston (44–19)	17.
18.	Texas	Texas (2–2)	Mississippi State (4–4)	Rice (7–5)	Sam Houston State (13–3)	Tennessee (17–2)	UCLA (14–8)	Cal State Fullerton (14–10)	Cal State Fullerton (16–11)	Vanderbilt (27–10)	Indiana (25–11)	Oklahoma State (31–13)	Vanderbilt (36–12)	Vanderbilt (38–14)	Mississippi State (35–20)	South Carolina (42–16)	Florida (40–23)	18.
19.	TCU	TCU (2–1)	UCLA (4–3)	Louisville (8–3)	North Carolina (10–4)	UC Santa Barbara (13–3)	Kentucky (17–7)	Oregon (19–8)	Ole Miss (25–8)	Kentucky (23–13)	Oregon (31–10)	Texas (32–13)	Alabama (30–18)	Alabama (32–19)	Vanderbilt (40–16)	Nebraska (40–19)	Florida State (43–17)	19.
20.	Louisville	Louisville (2–1)	Louisville (5–2)	Sam Houston State (10–2)	Kentucky (13–3)	Ole Miss (17–4)	Clemson (14–9)	LSU (20–8)	UNLV (22–9)	UNLV (25–11)	Mississippi State (26–15)	Vanderbilt (33–12)	Texas A&M (30–19)	Mississippi State (33–19)	Nebraska (37–18)	Vanderbilt (41–18)	Cal Poly (47–12)	20.
21.	Alabama	Alabama (2–1)	Alabama (4–2)	North Carolina (7–3)	Ole Miss (14–2)	Mississippi State (15–8)	Auburn (17–8)	UCLA (16–10)	Rice (22–12)	Indiana (21–11)	Oklahoma State (29–11)	Texas Tech (35–12)	Mississippi State (31–18)	Liberty (38–11)	Kansas (34–22)	Texas (38–18)	Indiana (44–15)	21.
22.	Kansas State	Cal Poly (3–0)	North Carolina (3–3)	TCU (7–4)	Tennessee (14–1)	UCLA (12–7)	Tennessee (19–4)	Kentucky (19–9)	UC Santa Barbara (20–7)	Clemson (21–14)	Clemson (24–15)	Liberty (35–10)	Liberty (35–10)	Kansas (33–21)	Texas (36–16)	Kentucky (35–23)	LSU (46–16–1)	22.
23.	Florida	Florida (2–1)	Texas A&M (6–1)	Kentucky (9–2)	UC Santa Barbara (10–2)	Houston (15–3)	Georgia Tech (15–9)	Ole Miss (21–8)	Indiana (17–10)	Oregon (27–10)	TCU (26–13)	UCF (28–16)	UC Irvine (32–14)	Pepperdine (34–14)	Texas Tech (40–16)	Pepperdine (39–16)	Miami (FL) (44–19)	23.
24.	Texas A&M	Texas A&M (3–0)	Arkansas (6–0)	Fresno State (9–2)	Mississippi State (12–7)	San Diego (14–4)	North Carolina (15–8)	Indiana (15–10)	Miami (21–12)	Mississippi State (22–15)	Arkansas (25–16)	Mercer (34–11)	Mercer (34–11)	UC Irvine (34–16)	Alabama (34–21)	Arkansas (38–23)	Washington (41–17–1)	24.
25.	Arkansas	Arkansas (3–0)	Florida (5–3)	Ole Miss (11–1)	UCLA (8–7)	Miami (FL) (11–9)	NC State (14–8)	UNLV (19–8)	Oregon (22–10)	Georgia Tech (23–14)	Vanderbilt (29–12)	Kentucky (27–17)	Texas (34–15)	Texas (34–15)	Sam Houston State (40–15)	Georgia Tech (36–25)	South Carolina (44–18)	25.
	Preseason Jan 27	Week 1 Feb 17	Week 2 Feb 24	Week 3 Mar 3	Week 4 Mar 10	Week 5 Mar 17	Week 6 Mar 24	Week 7 Mar 31	Week 8 Apr 7	Week 9 Apr 14	Week 10 Apr 21	Week 11 Apr 28	Week 12 May 5	Week 13 May 12	Week 14 May 19	Week 15 May 26	Week 16 June 26	
		Dropped: 22 Kansas State	None	Dropped: 21 Alabama; 23 Texas A&M; 24 Arkansas; 25 Florida	Dropped: 22 TCU; 24 Fresno State	Dropped: 16 Indiana; 20 Kentucky	Dropped: 16 Sam Houston State; 24 San Diego; 25 Miami	Dropped: 21 Auburn; 22 Tennessee; 23 Georgia Tech; 24 North Carolina; 25 NC State	Dropped: 21 UCLA	Dropped: 18 Cal State Fullerton	Dropped: 17 UC Santa Barbara; 20 UNLV; 25 Georgia Tech	Dropped: 19 Oregon; 20 Mississippi State; 22 Clemson; 24 Arkansas	Dropped: 21 Texas Tech; 23 UCF; 25 Kentucky	Dropped: 20 Texas A&M; 24 Mercer	Dropped: 21 Liberty; 23 Pepperdine; 24 UC Irvine	Dropped: 21 Kansas; 23 Texas Tech; 24 Alabama; 25 Sam Houston State	None	

== Collegiate Baseball ==
	Preseason Dec 20	Week 1 Feb 17	Week 2 Feb 24	Week 3 Mar 3	Week 4 Mar 10	Week 5 Mar 17	Week 6 Mar 24	Week 7 Mar 31	Week 8 Apr 7	Week 9 Apr 14	Week 10 Apr 21	Week 11 Apr 28	Week 12 May 5	Week 13 May 12	Week 14 May 19	Week 15 May 26	Week 16 June 3	Week 17 June 10	Week 18 June 26	
1.	Cal State Fullerton	Cal State Fullerton (2–1)	LSU (7–0)	South Carolina (10–0)	South Carolina (15–0)	South Carolina (18–1)	Louisiana–Lafayette (22–2)	South Carolina (24–3)	Louisiana–Lafayette (30–3)	Louisiana–Lafayette (34–4)	Cal Poly (34–5)	Virginia (37–8)	Oregon State (34–8)	Oregon State (38–8)	Oregon State (41–9)	Louisiana–Lafayette (53–7)	Louisiana–Lafayette (57–8)	Virginia (49–14)	Vanderbilt (51–21)	1.
2.	Mississippi State	Mississippi State (2–2)	Florida State (6–0)	Florida State (8–1)	Florida State (12–2)	Florida State (17–2)	South Carolina (19–3)	Louisiana–Lafayette (26–3)	Florida State (26–5)	Virginia (30–6)	Virginia (33–7)	Oregon State (31–8)	Virginia (37–9)	Virginia (41–9)	Louisiana–Lafayette (49–7)	Oregon State (42–12)	Virginia (47–13)	TCU (47–16)	Virginia (53–16)	2.
3.	LSU	LSU (3–0)	Oregon (7–0)	Cal State Fullerton (7–3)	LSU (14–2)	Vanderbilt (18–3)	Florida State (19–4)	Virginia (23–4)	Virginia (27–5)	Cal Poly (30–5)	Louisiana–Lafayette (36–5)	Cal Poly (36–7)	Louisiana–Lafayette (43–7)	Louisiana–Lafayette (46–7)	Miami (FL) (40–15)	Miami (FL) (41–17)	TCU (45–15)	Louisville (50–15)	Texas (46–21)	3.
4.	Oregon State	Oregon State (3–0)	Vanderbilt (7–0)	LSU (9–2)	Vanderbilt (15–2)	Virginia (15–3)	Virginia (18–4)	Florida State (22–5)	South Carolina (26–5)	Texas (29–8)	Oregon State (27–7)	Miami (FL) (32–13)	Florida (33–15)	Miami (FL) (38–14)	Virginia (43–11)	Virginia (44–13)	Oklahoma State (48–16)	Ole Miss (46–19)	Ole Miss (48–21)	4.
5.	Florida State	Florida State (3–0)	South Carolina (7–0)	Virginia (9–2)	Virginia (11–3)	Oregon State (18–3)	Vanderbilt (20–5)	Vanderbilt (23–6)	Oregon State (25–6)	Oregon State (27–7)	Washington (27–8–1)	Florida State (33–11)	Miami (FL (34–14)	Washington (36–11–1)	Cal Poly (45–10)	Cal Poly (45–10)	Louisville (48–15)	Vanderbilt (46–19)	TCU (48–18)	5.
6.	Oregon	Oregon (3–0)	Virginia (6–1)	Vanderbilt (10–2)	NC State (13–2)	Louisiana–Lafayette (17–2)	LSU (20–4–1)	Oregon State (21–6)	Cal Poly (26–5)	Washington (24–7–1)	Florida State (30–9)	Louisiana–Lafayette (39–6)	Florida State (36–11)	Florida State (39–12)	Florida State (41–14)	Indiana (42–13)	Ole Miss (44–18)	Texas (43–19)	UC Irvine (41–25)	6.
7.	Indiana	Louisville (2–1)	NC State (6–1)	NC State (9–2)	Oregon State (14–3)	LSU (17–4)	Oregon (17–5)	Cal Poly (23–4)	Texas (26–7)	Florida State (27–8)	Oregon (31–10)	Washington (29–10–1)	Washington (32–11–1)	Oklahoma State (38–13)	Oklahoma State (41–14)	LSU (44–14–1)	Houston (48–16)	Texas Tech (45–19)	Louisville (50–17)	7.
8.	Louisville	Vanderbilt (3–0)	Oregon State (5–2)	Oregon State (9–3)	Cal State Fullerton (8–5)	Oregon (14–5)	Oregon State (19–5)	Louisville (21–6)	Washington (22–6–1)	Alabama (24–11)	Alabama (28–12)	Florida (30–15)	Indiana (32–12)	Indiana (35–12)	Washington (38–13–1)	Florida State (43–15)	Vanderbilt (44–18)	UC Irvine (40–23)	Texas Tech (45–21)	8.
9.	Vanderbilt	Virginia (2–1)	Louisville (5–2)	Oregon (8–3)	Oregon (12–4)	Louisville (15–4)	Cal Poly (19–4)	Texas (22–7)	Alabama (22–9)	Louisville (27–8)	Florida (27–13)	LSU (33–11–1)	Oklahoma State (35–13)	TCU (36–14)	Indiana (38–13)	TCU (42–15)	Texas (41–19)	Louisiana–Lafayette (58–10)	Louisiana–Lafayette (58–10)	9.
10.	NC State	South Carolina (3–0)	Cal State Fullerton (4–3)	Louisville (8–3)	Louisiana–Lafayette (13–2)	Cal Poly (17–3)	UC Santa Barbara (17–3)	Mississippi State (20–10)	Vanderbilt (25–8)	Oregon (27–10)	LSU (30–10–1)	Ole Miss (33–12)	TCU (34–13)	Florida (34–18)	Louisville (43–13)	Oklahoma State (45–16)	Texas Tech (43–19)	Oklahoma State (48–18)	Oklahoma State (48–18)	10.
11.	North Carolina	Miami (FL) (2–1)	Oklahoma State (8–1)	Louisiana–Lafayette (10–2)	Louisville (10–4)	NC State (14–5)	Louisville (17–6)	Washington (20–5–1)	Louisville (23–8)	Miami (FL) (25–12)	Miami (FL) (27–13)	Indiana (28–12)	Cal Poly (38–9)	Louisville (40–12)	Florida (37–19)	Florida (40–21)	Pepperdine (42–16)	Houston (48–18)	Houston (48–18)	11.
12.	Virginia	North Carolina (1–1)	TCU (6–1)	Oklahoma State (10–2)	Cal Poly (11–3)	North Carolina (14–5)	Ole Miss (21–4)	Florida (19–9)	Oregon (22–10)	Florida (23–13)	Ole Miss (30–11)	Oklahoma State (31–13)	Louisville (37–11)	Cal Poly (41–10)	TCU (38–15)	Louisville (45–15)	Kennesaw State (40–22)	Pepperdine (43–18)	Pepperdine (43–18)	12.
13.	Miami (FL)	NC State (0–1)	Louisiana–Lafayette (7–1)	Cal Poly (8–2)	North Carolina (10–4)	Cal State Fullerton (10–7)	Cal State Fullerton (13–8)	UC Santa Barbara (19–5)	Florida (20–12)	Ole Miss (29–9)	Indiana (25–11)	TCU (30–13)	Ole Miss (35–14)	Ole Miss (37–15)	Ole Miss (40–16)	Washington (39–15–1)	Maryland (39–21)	Kennesaw State (40–24)	Kennesaw State (40–24)	13.
14.	South Carolina	UCLA (2–1)	Cal Poly (6–1)	Mississippi State (10–4)	Texas (13–4)	Tennessee (17–2)	Rice (19–6)	Oregon (19–8)	UC Santa Barbara (20–7)	LSU (27–9–1)	Oklahoma State (29–11)	South Carolina (34–11)	Oregon (34–13)	Vanderbilt (38–14)	LSU (40–14–1)	Ole Miss (41–18)	UC Irvine (38–23)	Maryland (40–23)	Maryland (40–23)	14.
15.	UCLA	Indiana (1–3)	Rice (6–2)	North Carolina (7–3)	Oklahoma State (11–4)	UC Santa Barbara (13–3)	Texas (19–6)	Alabama (19–8)	LSU (24–8–1)	South Carolina (28–7)	TCU (26–13)	Oregon (31–13)	LSU (35–13–1)	LSU (36–14–1)	South Carolina (42–14)	South Carolina (42–16)	Stanford (34–24)	Stanford (35–26)	Stanford (35–26)	15.
16.	Florida	Florida (2–1)	Clemson (6–1)	UCLA (7–4)	Ole Miss (14–2)	Ole Miss (17–4)	Mississippi State (17–9)	LSU (20–8–1)	Houston (25–6)	Vanderbilt (27–10)	Texas (30–11)	Alabama (29–15)	UC Irvine (32–14)	Mississippi State (33–19)	Oregon (40–16)	Houston (44–15)	College of Charleston (44–17)	College of Charleston (44–19)	College of Charleston (44–19)	16.
17.	Rice	Rice (2–1)	Miami (FL) (4–3)	Texas (9–3)	Tennessee (14–1)	San Diego (14–4)	Kentucky (17–7)	Houston (22–5)	Ole Miss (25–8)	UC Santa Barbara (22–8)	Pepperdine (30–9)	Pepperdine (30–9)	Vanderbilt (36–12)	South Carolina (39–13)	Mississippi State (35–20)	Rice (41–18)	Oregon State (45–14)	Oregon State (45–14)	Oregon State (45–14)	17.
18.	Oklahoma State	Oklahoma State (3–0)	Mississippi State (4–4)	Ole Miss (11–1)	Miami (FL) (10–5)	Kansas (14–5)	Houston (19–4)	Rice (21–9)	Kentucky (22–10)	Indiana (21–11)	South Carolina (30–10)	UCF (28–16)	Mississippi State (31–18)	Oregon (36–16)	Vanderbilt (40–16)	Arizona State (33–22)	Miami (44–19)	Miami (FL) (44–19)	Miami (FL) (44–19)	18.
19.	TCU	TCU (2–1)	North Carolina (3–3)	Tennessee (10–0)	FIU (15–1)	Texas (15–6)	Washington (16–5–1)	Cal State Fullerton (14–10)	Cal State Fullerton (16–11)	Pepperdine (27–8)	Rice (29–13)	Louisville (33–11)	South Carolina (35–13)	Houston (39–13)	Houston (41–14)	Vanderbilt (41–18)	Cal Poly (47–12)	Cal Poly (47–12)	Cal Poly (47–12)	19.
20.	Texas	Clemson (2–1)	UCLA (4–3)	Miami (FL) (5–5)	UC Santa Barbara (10–2)	Oklahoma State (14–6)	Auburn (17–8)	Ole Miss (21–8)	Miami (FL) (21–12)	Oklahoma State (26–10)	Mississippi State (26–15)	UC Irvine (28–14)	Alabama (30–18)	Rice (34–16)	Rice (37–17)	Oregon (42–18)	Indiana (44–15)	Indiana (44–15)	Indiana (44–15)	20.
21.	Clemson	Arizona State (2–1)	Florida (5–3)	FIU (11–1)	Kentucky (13–3)	Rice (15–6)	Tennessee (19–4)	Kentucky (19–9)	Mississippi State (20–13)	UC Irvine (24–11)	Kentucky (26–14)	Texas Tech (35–13)	Rice (31–15)	UC Irvine (34–16)	Arizona State (30–21)	Mississippi State (37–22)	LSU (46–16–1)	LSU (46–16–1)	LSU (46–16–1)	21.
22.	Arizona State	Louisiana–Lafayette (3–1)	Arizona (6–2)	Seton Hall (7–2)	Seton Hall (8–3)	Seton Hall (12–3)	Seton Hall (15–4)	Seton Hall (18–5)	Clemson (20–10)	Mississippi State (22–15)	UCF (25–16)	Texas (32–13)	Pepperdine (32–12)	Alabama (32–19)	Sam Houston State (40–15)	Cal State Fullerton (32–22)	Washington (41–17–1)	Washington (41–17–1)	Washington (41–17–1)	22.
23.	Louisiana–Lafayette	Arizona (2–1)	Texas A&M (6–1)	Kentucky (9–2)	Mississippi State (12–7)	UCLA (12–7)	UCLA (14–8)	Clemson (17–9)	Indiana (17–10)	Seton Hall (25–7)	Louisville (28–11)	Rice (31–15)	St. John's (30–15)	Liberty (38–11)	Arkansas (35–21)	Arkansas (38–23)	Florida State (43–17)	Florida State (43–17)	Florida State (43–17)	23.
24.	Arizona	Texas A&M (3–0)	Texas (5–3)	San Diego (8–1)	UCLA (8–7)	Mississippi State (15–8)	North Carolina (15–8)	Miami (FL) (17–12)	Pepperdine (24–7)	Rice (26–12)	New Mexico (30–11–1)	Southern California (24–17)	San Diego (33–16)	Pepperdine (34–14)	Nebraska (37–18)	Nebraska (40–19)	Florida (40–23)	Florida (40–23)	Florida (40–23)	24.
25.	Texas A&M	Texas (2–2)	Ole Miss (6–1)	Fresno State (9–2)	UC Irvine (11–3)	Sam Houston State (16–4)	Maryland (16–6)	Arizona State (15–11)	Arizona State (17–12)	UNLV (25–11)	Arkansas (25–16)	Vanderbilt (33–12)	Houston (35–13)	Sam Houston State (37–14)	Kansas (34–22)	Pepperdine (39–16)	South Carolina (44–18)	South Carolina (44–18)	South Carolina (44–18)	25.
26.	Stanford	Cal Poly (3–0)	Texas Tech (6–1)	Kansas (11–1)	Texas Tech (14–3)	Clemson (12–6)	VCU (20–3)	UCLA (16–10)	Oklahoma (23–10)	San Diego (25–10)	Vanderbilt (29–12)	Arizona State (23–17)	UCF (29–18)	Nebraska (34–17)	Ball State (38–16)	Kentucky (35–23)	Rice (42–20)	Rice (42–20)	Rice (42–20)	26.
27.	Cal Poly	Ole Miss (3–0)	Arkansas (6–0)	Arkansas (7–2)	Texas A&M (11–5)	TCU (12–7)	NC State (14–8)	Auburn (19–10)	San Diego (22–9)	Arizona State (19–14)	UC Santa Barbara (24–10)	UNLV (28–15)	Texas Tech (36–16)	Texas Tech (37–16)	Texas Tech (40–16)	Kennesaw State (37–21)	Oregon (44–20)	Oregon (44–20)	Oregon (44–20)	27.
28.	Kansas State	Alabama (2–1)	Tennessee (7–0)	TCU (7–4)	Clemson (9–5)	Alabama (12–6)	Clemson (14–9)	Indiana (15–10)	Seton Hall (21–7)	Houston (26–9)	UC Irvine (25–14)	Mississippi State (28–17)	Texas (34–15)	Texas (34–15)	Texas (36–16)	Georgia Tech (36–25)	Mississippi State (39–24)	Mississippi State (39–24)	Mississippi State (39–24)	28.
29.	Alabama	UNLV (4–0)	Southern California (7–0)	Rice (7–5)	Rice (10–6)	Auburn (13–7)	Baylor (13–10)	Pepperdine (20–7)	UCLA (18–12)	Cal State Fullerton (18–13)	Seton Hall (27–8)	Seton Hall (31–9)	Liberty (35–10)	Stony Brook (31–15)	Canisius (38–14)	Texas (38–18)	Cal State Fullerton (34–24)	Cal State Fullerton (34–24)	Cal State Fullerton (34–24)	29.
30.	Ole Miss	Texas Tech (3–1)	FIU (8–0)	Clemson (6–4)	TCU (9–6)	FIU (16–4)	FIU (20–4)	Oklahoma (20–9)	Rice (22–12)	Georgia Tech (23–14)	Liberty (31-9)	Liberty (35–10)	Duke (29–18)	Creighton (27–15–1)	Creighton (30–16–1)	San Diego State (42–19)	Arkansas (40–25)	Arkansas (40–25)	Arkansas (40–25)	30.
	Preseason Dec 20	Week 1 Feb 17	Week 2 Feb 24	Week 3 Mar 3	Week 4 Mar 10	Week 5 Mar 17	Week 6 Mar 24	Week 7 Mar 31	Week 8 Apr 7	Week 9 Apr 14	Week 10 Apr 21	Week 11 Apr 28	Week 12 May 5	Week 13 May 12	Week 14 May 19	Week 15 May 26	Week 16 June 3	Week 17 June 10	Week 18 June 26	
		Dropped: 26 Stanford; 28 Kansas State	Dropped: 15 Indiana; 21 Arizona State; 28 Alabama; 29 UNLV	Dropped: 21 Florida; 22 Arizona; 23 Texas A&M; 26 Texas Tech; 29 Southern California	Dropped: 24 San Diego; 25 Fresno State; 26 Kansas; 27 Arkansas	Dropped: 18 Miami (FL); 21 Kentucky; 25 UC Irvine; 26 Texas Tech; 27 Texas A&M	Dropped: 17 San Diego; 18 Kansas; 20 Oklahoma State; 25 Sam Houston State; 27 TCU; 28 Alabama	Dropped: 21 Tennessee; 24 North Carolina; 25 Maryland; 26 VCU; 27 NC State; 29 Baylor; 30 FIU	Dropped: 27 Auburn	Dropped: 18 Kentucky; 22 Clemson; 26 Oklahoma; 29 UCLA	Dropped: 25 UNLV; 26 San Diego; 27 Arizona State; 28 Houston; 29 Cal State Fullerton; 30 Georgia Tech	Dropped: 21 Kentucky; 24 New Mexico; 25 Arkansas; 27 UC Santa Barbara	Dropped: 24 Southern California; 26 Arizona State; 27 UNLV; 29 Seton Hall	Dropped: 23 St. John's; 24 San Diego; 26 UCF; 30 Duke	Dropped: 21 UC Irvine; 22 Alabama; 23 Liberty; 24 Pepperdine; 29 Stony Brook	Dropped: 22 Sam Houston State; 25 Kansas; 26 Ball State; 27 Texas Tech; 29 Canisius; 30 Creighton	Dropped: 18 Arizona State; 24 Nebraska; 26 Kentucky; 28 Georgia Tech; 30 San Diego State	None	None	

The Preseason poll ranked the top 40 teams in the nation. Teams not listed above are: 31. Western Carolina; 32. Oklahoma; 33. San Diego; 34. Wichita State; 35. Liberty; 36. Tennessee Tech; 37. New Mexico; 38. East Carolina; 39. UC Santa Barbara; 40. Coastal Carolina.

== NCBWA ==
	Preseason Feb 3	Week 1 Feb 17	Week 2 Feb 24	Week 3 Mar 3	Week 4 March 10	Week 5 March 17	Week 6 March 24	Week 7 March 31	Week 8 April 7	Week 9 April 14	Week 10 April 21	Week 11 April 28	Week 12 May 5	Week 13 May 12	Week 14 May 19	Week 15 May 26	Week 16 June 3	Week 17 June 26	
1.	Cal State Fullerton	Oregon State (3–0)	Virginia (6–1)	Virginia (9–2)	South Carolina (15–0)	Florida State (17–2)	Virginia (18–4)	Virginia (23–4)	Virginia (27–5)	Virginia (30–6)	Virginia (33–7)	Virginia (37–8)	Oregon State (34–8)	Oregon State (38–8)	Oregon State (41–9)	Louisiana–Lafayette (53–7)	Louisiana-Lafayette (57-8)	Vanderbilt (49–20)	1.
2.	Virginia	Cal State Fullerton (2–1)	Florida State (6–0)	Florida State (8–1)	Florida State (12–2)	South Carolina (18–1)	Florida State (19–4)	South Carolina (24–3)	Florida State (26–5)	Louisiana-Lafayette (34–4)	Cal Poly (34–5)	Oregon State (31–8)	Virginia (37–9)	Virginia (41–9)	Louisiana–Lafayette (49–7)	Oregon State (42–12)	Virginia (47-13)	Virginia (52–14)	2.
3.	Oregon State	Florida State (3–0)	LSU (7–0)	South Carolina (10–0)	Virginia (11–3)	Virginia (15–3)	LSU (20–4–1)	Florida State (22–5)	Louisiana-Lafayette (30–3)	Cal Poly (30–5)	Louisiana-Lafayette (36–5)	Louisiana-Lafayette (39–6)	Louisiana-Lafayette (43–7)	Louisiana–Lafayette (46–7)	Virginia (43–11)	Virginia (44–13)	Oklahoma State (48-16)	Texas (46–21)	3.
4.	Mississippi State	Virginia (2–1)	Vanderbilt (7–0)	Cal State Fullerton (7–3)	Oregon State (14–3)	Oregon State (18–3)	South Carolina (19–3)	Louisiana–Lafayette (26–3)	South Carolina (26–5)	Oregon State (27–7)	Oregon State (27–7)	Cal Poly (36–7)	Florida State (36–11)	Florida State (39–12)	Cal Poly (45–10)	LSU (44–14–1)	Louisville (48-15)	Ole Miss (48–21)	4.
5.	Florida State	LSU (3–0)	Oregon (7–0)	Oregon State (9–3)	Vanderbilt (15–2)	Vanderbilt (18–3)	Louisiana–Lafayette (22–2)	Vanderbilt (23–6)	Oregon State (25–6)	Florida State (27–8)	Florida State (30–9)	LSU (33–11–1)	Louisville (37–1)	Louisville (40–12)	Louisville (43–13)	Florida State (43–15)	Houston (48-16)	TCU (48–18)	5.
6.	LSU	Vanderbilt (3–0)	South Carolina (7–0)	Vanderbilt (10–2)	LSU (14–2)	LSU (17–4)	Vanderbilt (20–5)	Cal Poly (23–4)	Cal Poly (26–5)	South Carolina (28–7)	LSU (30–10–1)	Florida State (33–11)	Cal Poly (38–9)	Cal Poly (41–10)	Florida State (41–14)	Cal Poly (45–10)	Vanderbilt (44-18)	Louisville (50–17)	6.
7.	Indiana	Mississippi State (2–1)	Oregon State (5–2)	LSU (9–2)	NC State (13–2)	Louisville (15–4)	Oregon (17–5)	Oregon State (21–6)	Vanderbilt (25–8)	Texas (29–8)	Oregon (31–10)	South Carolina (34–11)	Oklahoma State (35–13)	Oklahoma State (38–13)	Oklahoma State (41–14)	Oklahoma State (45–16)	TCU (45-15)	UC Irvine (41–25)	7.
8.	NC State	Oregon (3–0)	NC State (6–1)	NC State (9–2)	Cal State Fullerton (8–5)	Louisiana–Lafayette (17–2)	Oregon State (19–5)	Louisville (21–6)	LSU (24–8–1)	LSU (27–9–1)	South Carolina (30–10)	Louisville (33–11)	LSU (35–13–1)	LSU (36–14–1)	LSU (40–14–1)	Louisville (45–15)	Mississippi (44-18)	Texas Tech (45–21)	8.
9.	UCLA	South Carolina (3–0)	Cal State Fullerton (4–3)	UCLA (7–4)	Oregon (12–4)	Oregon (14–5)	Cal Poly (19–4)	Oregon (19–8)	Texas (26–7)	Louisville (27–8)	Oklahoma State (29–11)	Oklahoma State (31–13)	Oregon (34–13)	South Carolina (39–13)	South Carolina (42–14)	Houston (44–15)	Texas (41-9)	Louisiana–Lafayette (58–10)	9.
10.	Vanderbilt	UCLA (2–1)	Rice (6–2)	Louisville (8–3)	Louisville (10–4)	Cal Poly (17–3)	Louisville (17–6)	LSU (20–8–1)	Louisville (23–8)	Oregon (27–10)	Texas (30–11)	Oregon (31–13)	Vanderbilt (36–12)	Vanderbilt (38–14)	Vanderbilt (40–16)	Florida (40–21)	Texas Tech (43-9)	Oklahoma State (48–18)	10.
11.	Oregon	Rice (2–1)	Clemson (5–1)	Oregon (8–3)	Louisiana–Lafayette (13–2)	NC State (14–5)	Cal State Fullerton (13–8)	Texas (22–7)	Houston (25–6)	Vanderbilt (27–10)	Washington (27–8–1)	Vanderbilt (33–12)	Florida (33–15)	Washington (36–11–1)	Miami (FL) (40–15)	Indiana (42–13)	Pepperdine (42-16)	Houston (48–18)	11.
12.	South Carolina	NC State (0–1)	Louisville (5–2)	Mississippi State (10–4)	Cal Poly (11–3)	Cal State Fullerton (10–8)	Ole Miss (21–4)	Houston (22–5)	Oregon (22–10)	Ole Miss (29–9)	Houston (29–10)	Texas (32–13)	South Carolina (35–13)	Houston (39–13)	Houston (41–14)	South Carolina (42–16)	Oregon State (45-14)	Pepperdine (43–18)	12.
13.	North Carolina	Louisville (2–1)	UCLA (4–3)	Oklahoma State (10–2)	North Carolina (10–4)	North Carolina (14–5)	Rice (19–6)	Mississippi State (20–10)	Clemson (20–10)	Oklahoma State (26–10)	Louisville (28–11)	Washington (29–10–1)	Washington (32–11–1)	Miami (FL) (38–14)	Washington (38–13–1)	Vanderbilt (41–18)	LSU (46-16-1)	Stanford (35–26)	13.
14.	Louisville	North Carolina (1–1)	Oklahoma State (8–1)	Cal Poly (8–2)	Ole Miss (14–2)	UCLA (12–7)	UCLA (14–8)	Rice (21–9)	Ole Miss (25–8)	Houston (26–9)	Florida (27–13)	Florida (30–15)	Houston (35–13)	Florida (34–18)	Florida (37–19)	Miami (FL) (41–17)	Cal Poly (47-12)	Oregon State (45–14)	14.
15.	Rice	Clemson (2–1)	Mississippi State (4–4)	Louisiana–Lafayette (10–2)	UCLA (8–7)	Ole Miss (17–4)	Mississippi State (17–9)	Clemson (17–9)	Cal State Fullerton (16–11)	Washington (24–7–1)	Vanderbilt (29–12)	Ole Miss (33–12)	Miami (FL (34–14)	Oregon (36–16)	Oregon (40–16)	Rice (41–18)	UC Irvine (38-23)	LSU (46–16–1)	15.
16.	Clemson	Indiana (1–3)	TCU (6–1)	North Carolina (7–3)	Texas (13–4)	Rice (18–6)	Texas (19–6)	Cal State Fullerton (14–10)	Alabama (22–9)	Rice (26–12)	Rice (29–13)	Houston (31–12)	Ole Miss (35–14)	Ole Miss (37–15)	Ole Miss (40–16)	TCU (42–15)	College of Charleston (44-17)	Maryland (40–23)	16.
17.	Miami (FL)	Miami (FL) (2–1)	Cal Poly (6–1)	Ole Miss (11–1)	Clemson (9–5)	Clemson (12–6)	Houston (19–4)	UCLA (16–10)	Kentucky (22–10)	Alabama (24–11)	Alabama (28–12)	Miami (FL) (32–13)	Texas (34–15)	Rice (34–16)	Rice (37–17)	Ole Miss (41–18)	Stanford (34-24)	College of Charleston (44–19)	17.
18.	Kansas State	Oklahoma State (3–0)	Texas A&M (6–1)	Rice (7–5)	Rice (10–6)	Mississippi State (15–8)	NC State (14–8)	Ole Miss (21–8)	Oklahoma State (22–10)	Florida (23–13)	Ole Miss (30–12)	Rice (31–15)	Rice (31-15)	Indiana (35–12)	Indiana (38–13)	Washington (39–15–1)	Florida State (43-17)	Cal Poly (47–12)	18.
19.	Oklahoma State	Arizona State (2–1)	Miami (FL) (4–3)	Clemson (6–4)	Oklahoma State (11–4)	Texas (15–6)	North Carolina (15–8)	Florida (19–9)	Mississippi State (20–13)	Cal State Fullerton (18–13)	Miami (FL) (27–13)	Indiana (28–12)	Indiana (32–12)	Texas (34–15)	Texas (36–16)	Oregon (42–18)	Indiana (44-15)	Kennesaw State (40–24)	19.
20.	Arizona State	Florida (2–1)	Louisiana–Lafayette (7–1)	Texas (9–3)	Mississippi State (12–7)	Oklahoma State (14–6)	Clemson (14–9)	Oklahoma State (19–9)	Washington (22–6–1)	Miami (FL) (25–12)	Clemson (24–15)	Alabama (29–15)	TCU (34–13)	TCU (36–14)	TCU (38–15)	Texas (38–18)	Maryland (39-21)	Indiana (44–15)	20.
21.	Florida	Texas A&M (3–0)	North Carolina (3–3)	TCU (7–4)	Kentucky (13–3)	Tennessee (17–2)	Kentucky (17–7)	Alabama (19–8)	Rice (22–12)	Clemson (21–14)	Mississippi State (26–15)	Texas Tech (35–13)	Mississippi State (31–18)	Mississippi State (33–19)	Mississippi State (35–20)	Nebraska (40–19)	Kennesaw State (40-22)	Florida State (43–17)	21.
22.	TCU	Cal Poly (3–0)	Arkansas (6–0)	Kentucky (9–2)	Miami (FL) (10–5)	Sam Houston State (16–4)	Texas A&M (17–8)	Kentucky (19–9)	UCLA (18–12)	Mississippi State (22–15)	Kentucky (26–14)	TCU (30–13)	Clemson (28–19)	Alabama (32–19)	Texas Tech (40–16)	Mississippi State (37–22)	Miami (44-19)	Miami (FL) (44–19)	22.
23.	Texas A&M	TCU (2–1)	Florida (5–3)	Miami (FL) (5–5)	Texas A&M (11–5)	Houston (15–3)	Tennessee (19–4)	UC Santa Barbara (19–5)	Miami (FL) (21–12)	UC Santa Babara (22–8)	Texas Tech (32–11)	Mississippi State (28–17)	Alabama (30–18)	Texas Tech (37–16)	Sam Houston State (40–15)	Texas Tech (40–18)	South Carolina (44-18)	South Carolina (44–18)	23.
24.	Louisiana–Lafayette	Louisiana–Lafayette (3–1)	Ole Miss (6–1)	Arizona State (6–4)	Sam Houston State (13–3)	TCU (12–7)	Oklahoma State (16–8)	Washington (20–5–1)	Florida (20–12)	Kentucky (23–13)	Indiana (25–11)	UC Santa Barbara (26–11)	Texas Tech (36–16)	Liberty (38–11)	Nebraska (37–18)	Pepperdine (39–16)	Florida (40-23)	Rice (42–20)	24.
25.	Texas	Arkansas (3–0)	Indiana (2–5)	Texas A&M (7–4)	Texas Tech (14–3)	San Diego (14–4)	Auburn (17–8)	NC State (15–11)	NC State (18–12)	Texas Tech (28–11)	UC Santa Barbara (24–10)	Pepperdine (30–9)	UC Irvine (32–14)	Clemson (31–21)	Alabama (34–21)	Sam Houston State (41–17)	Rice (42-20)	Florida (40–23)	25.
26.	Arkansas	Ole Miss (3–0)	Texas Tech (6–1)	Indiana (4–5)	Tennessee (14–1)	Texas A&M (14–7)	UC Santa Barbara (17–3)	Texas Tech (22–9)	UC Santa Barbara (20–7)	Indiana (21–11)	Pepperdine (30–9)	Clemson (25–19)	Liberty (35–10)	Sam Houston State (37–14)	Clemson (34–22)	Clemson (36–23)	Washington (41-17-1)	Washington (41–17–1)	26.
27.	Alabama	Alabama (2–1)	Texas (6–1)	Arkansas (7–2)	TCU (9–6)	Kentucky (14–6)	Texas Tech (19–7)	Miami (FL) (17–12)	Tennessee (21–9)	UCLA (19–15)	UCLA (21–16)	Kentucky (27–17)	Pepperdine (32–12)	UC Irvine (34–16)	Arkansas (35–21)	Arkansas (38–23)	Oregon (44-20)	Oregon (44–20)	27.
28.	Oklahoma	Texas Tech (3–1)	Alabama (4–2)	Sam Houston State (10–2)	Indiana (7–6)	Alabama (12–6)	Oklahoma (18–7)	Tennessee (19–7)	Oklahoma (23–10)	Pepperdine (27–8)	TCU (26–13)	Cal State Fullerton (21–17)	Sam Houston State (34–14)	Nebraska (34–17)	Liberty (39–14)	Dallas Baptist (40–19)	Mississippi State (39-24)	Mississippi State (39–24)	28.
29.	Cal Poly	Oklahoma (2–1)	Arizona State (3–4)	College of Charleston (10–1)	FIU (15–1)	Texas Tech (16–5)	FIU (20–4)	Oklahoma (20–9)	North Carolina (18–13)	Tennessee (23–11)	Cal State Fullerton (18–16)	Liberty (35–10)	Nebraska (32–17)	Pepperdine (34–14)	Pepperdine (36–16)	Alabama (34–22)	Alabama (37-24)	Alabama (37–24)	29.
30.	Florida Atlantic	Kentucky (2–1)	Kentucky (5–2)	Texas Tech (9–3)	Houston (11–3)	Oklahoma (15–5)	Alabama (15–8)	North Carolina (15–12)	Texas Tech (24–11)	Liberty (29–8)	New Mexico (30–11–1)	UCF (28–16)	Mercer (34–11)	UAB (34–16)	Dallas Baptist (36–18)	San Diego State (42–19)	Nebraska (41-21)	Nebraska (41–21)	30.
	Preseason Feb 3	Week 1 Feb 17	Week 2 Feb 24	Week 3 Mar 3	Week 4 March 10	Week 5 March 17	Week 6 March 24	Week 7 March 31	Week 8 April 7	Week 9 April 14	Week 10 April 21	Week 11 April 28	Week 12 May 5	Week 13 May 12	Week 14 May 19	Week 15 May 26	Week 16 June 3	Week 17 June 26	
		Dropped: 18 Kansas State; 25 Texas; 30 Florida Atlantic	Dropped: 29 Oklahoma	Dropped: 23 Florida; 28 Alabama	Dropped: 24 Arizona State; 27 Arkansas; 29 College of Charleston	Dropped: 22 Miami (FL); 28 Indiana; 29 FIU	Dropped: 22 Sam Houston State; 24 TCU; 25 San Diego	Dropped: 22 Texas A&M; 25 Auburn; 29 FIU	None	Dropped: 25 NC State; 28 Oklahoma; 29 North Carolina	Dropped: 29 Tennessee; 30 Liberty	Dropped: 27 UCLA; 30 New Mexico	Dropped: 24 UC Santa Barbara; 27 Kentucky; 28 Cal State Fullerton; 30 UCF	Dropped: 30 Mercer	Dropped: 27 UC Irvine; 30 UAB	Dropped: 28 Liberty	Dropped: 25 Sam Houston State; 26 Clemson; 27 Arkansas; 28 Dallas Baptist; 30 San Diego State	None	

The preseason poll ranked the top 35 teams. Remaining teams not listed above were: 31. Stanford; 32. Ole Miss; 33. Arizona; 34. East Carolina; 35. Georgia Tech.
