= Andrew Morales =

American professional baseball pitcher (born 1993)

- Pitcher
- Born: January 16, 1993 (age 33); Covina, California, U.S.
- Bats: Right Throws: Right
- Stats at Baseball Reference

Andrew John Morales (born January 16, 1993) is an American former professional baseball pitcher.

== Career ==
Morales graduated from South Hills High School and played college baseball at Rio Hondo College from 2011 to 2012 before transferring to UC Irvine and playing there from 2013 to 2014. In 2014, he was named an All-American and won the Senior CLASS Award for baseball. During his college career he went 42–3 with a 2.00 earned run average (ERA) and 361 strikeouts.

=== St. Louis Cardinals ===
Morales was drafted by the St. Louis Cardinals in the second round of the 2014 Major League Baseball draft. He signed with the Cardinals and spent his first professional season with both the Gulf Coast Cardinals and the Palm Beach Cardinals, where he went 1–1 with a 2.19 ERA in 12.1 innings pitched between both clubs. Morales spent 2015 with the Springfield Cardinals, where he went 5–8 with a 5.00 ERA in 26 starts. He returned to Springfield in 2016, going 4–4 with a 3.35 ERA in only 14 starts due to injury. Morales began 2017 on the disabled list with Springfield, and after he was activated, was assigned to Palm Beach; however, he soon returned to Springfield, and was then assigned to Memphis, but once again returned to Springfield. Morales finished 2017 with a 2–1 record, a 3.55 ERA, and 36 strikeouts in 34 innings pitched.

Morales spent a majority of 2018 with Memphis, pitching to a 2–4 record with a 3.88 ERA in 46 relief appearances along with pitching in three games for Springfield. He missed all of 2019 due to injury. He was released by the Cardinals on January 10, 2020.

=== Acereros de Monclova ===
On May 20, 2021, Morales signed with the Acereros de Monclova of the Mexican League for the 2021 season. In 23 relief appearances, he registered a 1–2 record with a 4.81 ERA and 30 strikeouts.

=== Saraperos de Saltillo ===
On October 13, 2021, Morales, along with IF Jose Vargas and P Ryan Verdugo, were traded to the Saraperos de Saltillo of the Mexican League in exchange for OF Juan Perez.
