= List of Senior CLASS Award baseball winners =

Senior CLASS Award for baseball
- Awarded for: the outstanding senior NCAA Division I Student-Athlete of the Year in baseball
- Country: United States

History
- First award: 2007
- Most recent: Christian Policelli, Navy (2022)
- Website: http://www.seniorclassaward.com/baseball/

The Senior CLASS Award is presented each year to the outstanding senior NCAA Division I Student-Athlete of the Year in baseball. The award was established in 2007.

Year	Winner	School
2007	Emeel Salem	Alabama
2008	Cole St. Clair	Rice
2009	Brandon McArthur	Florida
2010	Daniel Bibona	UC Irvine
2011	Tyler Wilson	Virginia
2012	James Ramsey	Florida State
2013	Carlos Lopez	Cal State Fullerton
2014	Andrew Morales	UC Irvine
2015	Trever Allen	Arizona State
2016	Matt Parrish	Campbell
2017	Anthony Critelli	Holy Cross
2018	Troy Squires	Kentucky
2019	Jake Mangum	Mississippi State
2020	Not presented; season canceled in progress due to COVID-19	
2021	T.J. Collett	Kentucky
2022	Christian Policelli	Navy

== See also ==
- List of college baseball awards
- Baseball awards#U.S. college baseball
