= 2014 Oregon State Beavers baseball team =

American college baseball season

2014 Oregon State Beavers baseball

Pac-12 champions

Corvallis Regional, 3–2
- Conference: Pac-12 Conference
- Record: 42–12 (23–7 Pac-12)
- Head coach: Pat Casey (20th season)
- Assistant coaches: Pat Bailey (7th season); Andy Jenkins (3rd season)
- Pitching coach: Nate Yeskie (6th season)
- Home stadium: Goss Stadium at Coleman Field

2014 Pac-12 Conference baseball standings
	Conf.						Overall
Team	W		L		T	PCT	W		L		T	PCT
No. 17 Oregon State ‍†‍‍^{y}	23	–	7	–	0	.767	45	–	14	–	0	.763
No. 22 Washington ‍‍‍^{y}	21	–	9	–	0	.700	41	–	17	–	1	.703
Arizona State ‍‍‍^{y}	19	–	11	–	0	.633	33	–	24	–	0	.579
No. 27 Oregon ‍‍‍^{y}	18	–	12	–	0	.600	44	–	20	–	0	.688
No. 15 Stanford ‍‍‍^{y}	16	–	14	–	0	.533	35	–	26	–	0	.574
Southern California ‍‍‍	16	–	14	–	0	.533	29	–	24	–	0	.547
Washington State ‍‍‍	14	–	16	–	0	.467	24	–	30	–	0	.444
California ‍‍‍	13	–	17	–	0	.433	26	–	27	–	0	.491
UCLA ‍‍‍	12	–	18	–	0	.400	25	–	30	–	1	.455
Arizona ‍‍‍	9	–	21	–	0	.300	22	–	33	–	0	.400
Utah ‍‍‍	4	–	26	–	0	.133	16	–	36	–	0	.308
† – Conference champion y – Invited to the NCAA tournament Rankings from Collegiate Baseball

The 2014 Oregon State Beavers baseball team represented Oregon State University in the 2014 NCAA Division I baseball season. The Beavers played their home games at Goss Stadium at Coleman Field and were members of the Pac-12 Conference. The team was coached by Pat Casey in his 20th season at Oregon State. The Beavers were coming off a season in which they won the Pac-12 conference with a 24–6 conference record, and made it to the semifinals of the College World Series in Omaha, Nebraska, officially finishing tied for 3rd in the tournament.

== Offseason news ==
On Opening Day, the NCAA announced the decision to declare senior pitcher Ben Wetzler ineligible due to violating NCAA regulations. When deciding whether to forgo his senior year in favor of playing professionally, Wetzler had contact with an adviser who in turn had contact with a professional organization. The NCAA declared Wetzler ineligible for 20% of the team's games, making him eligible on Sunday, March 2, a home matchup slated against the Wright State Raiders.

== Roster ==
2014 Oregon State Beavers roster
Pitchers: 9 Wetzler, Ben - Senior; 10 Davis, Dylan - Junior; 11 Fry, Jace - Junior; 17 Fox, Mak - Freshman; 18 Jackson, Brandon - Senior; 22 Eden, Chandler - Freshman; 23 Moore, Andrew - Sophomore; 24 Schultz, Scott - Senior; 25 Painton, Tyler - Junior; 26 Shelton, Trent - Freshman; 29 Belding, Phillip - Junior; 30 Howard, Michael - Junior; 31 Flemer, Kevin - Freshman; 34 Engelbrekt, Max - Sophomore; 35 Pomeroy, John - Freshman; 38 Reser, Zack - R Junior; 44 Thompson, Jake - Freshman	Catchers: 6 Esposito, Nate - Junior; 33 Ice, Logan - Freshman; 37 Fishback, Mason - Freshman; Infielders: 1 Peterson, Andy - Senior; 3 Keyes, Kavin - Senior; 4 Mildenberg, Tyler - Freshman; 7 Morrison, Trever - Freshman; 13 James, Dan - Freshman; 14 Hamilton, Caleb - Freshman; 15 Casper, Jerad - Senior; 16 Clark, Gabe - Sophomore; 19 King, Billy - Freshman; 45 Clardy, Caylen - Sophomore	Outfielders: 8 Conforto, Michael - Junior; 10 Davis, Dylan - Junior; 12 Rulli, Nick - Senior; 19 King, Billy - Freshman; 28 Jarmon, Hunter - Freshman; 30 Howard, Michael - Junior; 40 Hendrix, Jeff - Sophomore; 45 Clardy, Caylen - Sophomore

== Coaches ==
2014 Oregon State Beavers baseball coaching staff
- 5 Pat Casey - Head coach - 20th year
- 27 Pat Bailey - Assistant coach - 8th year
- 2 Andy Jenkins - Assistant coach - 2nd year
- 21 Nate Yeskie - Assistant coach - 7th year

== Schedule ==
2014 Oregon State Beavers baseball game log: 45–14
Regular season: 42–12

February: 7–2
Date	Opponent	Rank	Site/stadium	Score	Attendance	Overall record	Pac-12 Record
Feb 14	vs Gonzaga	No. 4	Tempe Diablo Stadium • Tempe, AZ	W 4–3	1,650	1–0	—
Feb 15	vs Nebraska	No. 4	Tempe Diablo Stadium • Tempe, AZ	W 15–7	3,246	2–0	–
Feb 16	vs Pacific	No. 4	Tempe Diablo Stadium • Tempe, AZ	W 14–6	1,036	3–0	–
Feb 17	vs Pacific	No. 4	Tempe Diablo Stadium • Tempe, AZ	W 7–0	1,178	4–0	–
Feb 21	vs Nebraska	No. 4	Surprise Stadium • Surprise, AZ	L 2–9	1,341	4–1	—
Feb 22	vs Michigan State	No. 4	Surprise Stadium • Surprise, AZ	L 7–8	1,766	4–2	—
Feb 23	vs No. 16 Indiana	No. 4	Surprise Stadium • Surprise, AZ	W 8–1	1,578	5–2	—
Feb 24	vs Washington	No. 8	Surprise Stadium • Surprise, AZ	W 3–2	1,233	6–2	—
Feb 28	vs Wright State	No. 8	Goss Stadium • Corvallis, OR	W 7–0	2,744	7–2	—

March: 14–4
Date	Opponent	Rank	Site/stadium	Score	Attendance	Overall record	Pac-12 Record
Mar 1	vs Wright State	No. 8	Goss Stadium • Corvallis, OR	W 6–4	2,407	8–2	—
Mar 1	vs Wright State	No. 8	Goss Stadium • Corvallis, OR	L 2–6	2,407	8–3	—
Mar 2	vs Wright State	No. 8	Goss Stadium • Corvallis, OR	W 13–2	2,032	9–3	—
Mar 4	vs Portland	No. 8	Goss Stadium • Corvallis, OR	W 5–0	2,342	10–3	—
Mar 7	vs Northern Illinois	No. 8	Goss Stadium • Corvallis, OR	W 6–0	2,627	11–3	—
Mar 8	vs Northern Illinois	No. 8	Goss Stadium • Corvallis, OR	W 2–0	2,349	12–3	—
Mar 8	vs Northern Illinois	No. 8	Goss Stadium • Corvallis, OR	W 12–2	2,349	13–3	—
Mar 9	vs Northern Illinois	No. 8	Goss Stadium • Corvallis, OR	W 10–0	2,064	14–3	—
Mar 11	vs Ohio State	No. 7	Goss Stadium • Corvallis, OR	W 4–3	2,627	15–3	—
Mar 14	@ Utah	No. 7	Smith's Ballpark • Salt Lake City, UT	W 6–1	1,004	16–3	1–0
Mar 15	@ Utah	No. 7	Smith's Ballpark • Salt Lake City, UT	W 5–1	1,171	17–3	2–0
Mar 16	@ Utah	No. 7	Smith's Ballpark • Salt Lake City, UT	W 8–0	1,216	18–3	3–0
Mar 21	vs Arizona State	No. 5	Goss Stadium • Corvallis, OR	W 4–0	2,792	19–3	4–0
Mar 22	vs Arizona State	No. 5	Goss Stadium • Corvallis, OR	L 2–3	3,021	19–4	4–1
Mar 23	vs Arizona State	No. 5	Goss Stadium • Corvallis, OR	L 3–7	2,961	19–5	4–2
Mar 24	vs Seattle U	No. 5	Goss Stadium • Corvallis, OR	Postponed (weather)			
Mar 28	@ Arizona	No. 8	Hi Corbett Field • Tucson, AZ	W 11–2	3,254	20–5	5–2
Mar 29	@ Arizona	No. 8	Hi Corbett Field • Tucson, AZ	L 2–11	1,943	20–6	5–3
Mar 30	@ Arizona	No. 8	Hi Corbett Field • Tucson, AZ	W 11–0	2,307	21–6	6–3

April: 10–2
Date	Opponent	Rank	Site/stadium	Score	Attendance	Overall record	Pac-12 Record
Apr 1	@ Portland	No. 6	Joe Etzel Field • Portland, OR	W 9–6	723	22–6	—
Apr 4	vs Stanford	No. 6	Goss Stadium • Corvallis, OR	W 4–1	2,965	23–6	7–3
Apr 5	vs Stanford	No. 6	Goss Stadium • Corvallis, OR	W 1–0	2,758	24–6	8–3
Apr 6	vs Stanford	No. 6	Goss Stadium • Corvallis, OR	W 2–1	2,836	25–6	9–3
Apr 11	at Washington State	No. 5	Bailey-Brayton Field • Pullman, WA	L 1–4	1,621	25–7	9–4
Apr 12	at Washington State	No. 5	Bailey-Brayton Field • Pullman, WA	W 12–5	3,362	26–7	10–4
Apr 13	at Washington State	No. 5	Bailey-Brayton Field • Pullman, WA	W 8–1	1,234	27–7	11–4
Apr 21	at Sacramento State	No. 4	Raley Field • Sacramento, CA	L 6–7	1,569	27–8	11–4
Apr 22	at Sacramento State	No. 4	John Smith Field • Sacramento, CA	W 8–1	903	28–8	—
Apr 25	vs No. 9 Oregon	No. 4	Goss Stadium • Corvallis, OR	W 3–1	3,121	29–8	12–4
Apr 26	vs No. 9 Oregon	No. 4	Goss Stadium • Corvallis, OR	W 4–2	3,307	30–8	13–4
Apr 27	vs No. 9 Oregon	No. 4	Goss Stadium • Corvallis, OR	W 7–1	3,122	31–8	14–4

May: 11–4
Date	Opponent	Rank	Site/stadium	Score	Attendance	Overall record	Pac-12 Record
May 2	at California	No. 2	Evans Diamond • Berkeley, CA	W 10–4	1,783	32–8	15–4
May 3	at California	No. 2	Evans Diamond • Berkeley, CA	W 9–3	873	33–8	16–4
May 4	at California	No. 2	Evans Diamond • Berkeley, CA	W 5–0	1,303	34–8	17–4
May 6	at No. 14 Oregon	No. 1	PK Park • Eugene, OR	W 4–3	1,798	35–8	—
May 9	vs No. 24 UCLA	No. 1	Goss Stadium • Corvallis, OR	W 4–2	2,813	36–8	18–4
May 10	vs No. 24 UCLA	No. 1	Goss Stadium • Corvallis, OR	W 9–3	3,056	37–8	19–4
May 11	vs No. 24 UCLA	No. 1	Goss Stadium • Corvallis, OR	W 11–2	3,209	38–8	20–4
May 13	vs Portland	No. 1	Volcanoes Stadium • Keizer, OR	W 8–4	4,226	39–8	—
May 16	vs No. 5 Washington	No. 1	Goss Stadium • Corvallis, OR	L 2–4	3,309	39–9	20–5
May 17	vs No. 5 Washington	No. 1	Goss Stadium • Corvallis, OR	W 1–0	3,323	40–9	21–5
May 18	vs No. 5 Washington	No. 1	Goss Stadium • Corvallis, OR	W 3–0	3,277	41–9	22–5
May 20	at No. 16 Oregon	No. 1	PK Park • Eugene, OR	L 2–6	2,979	41–10	—
May 23	vs USC	No. 1	Dedeaux Field • Los Angeles, CA	L 2–4	n/a	41–11	22–6
May 24	vs USC	No. 1	Dedeaux Field • Los Angeles, CA	W 2–0	864	42–11	23–6
May 25	vs USC	No. 1	Dedeaux Field • Los Angeles, CA	L 1–3	1,094	42–12	23–7

Postseason: 3–2

NCAA Corvallis Regional: 3–2
Date	Opponent	Seed/Rank	Site/stadium	Score	Attendance	Overall record	Regional Record
May 30	(4) North Dakota State	(1) No. 2	Goss Stadium • Corvallis, OR	W 2–1	3,408	43–12	1–0
May 31	(3) UC Irvine	(1) No. 2	Goss Stadium • Corvallis, OR	L 2–14	3,422	43–13	1–1
June 1	(2) UNLV	(1) No. 2	Goss Stadium • Corvallis, OR	W 6–1	3,372	44–13	2–1
June 1	(3) UC Irvine	(1) No. 2	Goss Stadium • Corvallis, OR	W 4–0	3,386	45–13	3–1
June 2	(3) UC Irvine	(1) No. 2	Goss Stadium • Corvallis, OR	L 2–4	3,435	45–14	3–2

== Ranking movements ==
Ranking movements Legend: ██ Increase in ranking ██ Decrease in ranking
	Week																			
Poll	Pre	1	2	3	4	5	6	7	8	9	10	11	12	13	14	15	16	17	18	Final
Coaches'	3	3*	3	6	4	4	7	6	5	3	4	3	2	2	1	2	2	2	2	12
Baseball America	2	2	4	5	4	4	6	6	6	5	5	2	2	2	1	2	2	2	2	13
Collegiate Baseball^	4	4	8	8	7	5	8	6	5	5	4	2	1	1	1	2	17	17	17	17
NCBWA†	3	1	7	5	4	4	8	7	5	4	4	2	1	1	1	12	12	12	12	14

^ Collegiate Baseball ranked 40 teams in their preseason poll, but only ranked 30 teams weekly during the season.
† NCBWA ranks 30 teams in their preseason poll, but only ranks 25 teams weekly during the season.
* A new poll was not released for this week, so for comparison purposes, the previous week's ranking is inserted in this week's slot.
