= 2013 Vanderbilt Commodores baseball team =

American college baseball season

2013 Vanderbilt Commodores baseball

SEC East Division Champion SEC Regular season Champion Nashville Regional Champion

Nashville Super Regional, 0–2
- Conference: Southeastern Conference
- East Division

Ranking
- Coaches: No. 9
- CB: No. 9
- Record: 54–10 (26–3 SEC)
- Head coach: Tim Corbin
- Home stadium: Hawkins Field

2013 Southeastern Conference baseball standings
	Conf.				Overall
Team	W		L	PCT	W		L	PCT
Eastern
No. 9 Vanderbilt ^{x}‍†‍‍^{y}	26	–	3	.897	54	–	12	.818
No. 13 South Carolina ‍‍‍^{y}	17	–	12	.586	43	–	20	.683
Florida ‍‍‍^{y}	14	–	16	.467	29	–	30	.492
Kentucky ‍‍‍	11	–	19	.367	30	–	25	.545
Missouri ‍‍‍	10	–	20	.333	18	–	32	.360
Tennessee ‍‍‍	8	–	20	.286	22	–	30	.423
Georgia ‍‍‍	7	–	20	.259	21	–	32	.396
Western
No. 7 LSU ^{x}‍‍‡‍^{y}	23	–	7	.767	57	–	11	.838
No. 18 Arkansas ‍‍‍^{y}	18	–	11	.621	39	–	22	.639
No. 2 Mississippi State ‍‍‍^{y}	16	–	14	.533	51	–	20	.718
Ole Miss ‍‍‍^{y}	15	–	15	.500	38	–	24	.613
Alabama ‍‍‍^{y}	14	–	15	.483	35	–	28	.556
Texas A&M ‍‍‍^{y}	13	–	16	.448	34	–	29	.540
Auburn ‍‍‍	13	–	17	.433	33	–	23	.589
x – Division champion † – Conference champion ‡ – Tournament champion y – Invited to the NCAA tournament As of June 26, 2013; Rankings from Collegiate Baseball

The 2013 Vanderbilt Commodores baseball team represented Vanderbilt University in the 2013 NCAA Division I baseball season. The team played its home games at Hawkins Field in Nashville, Tennessee. The team was coached by Tim Corbin in his eleventh season at Vanderbilt. The Commodores claimed the conference championship in the Southeastern Conference and set a league record by winning 26 SEC games.

== Roster ==
2013 Vanderbilt Commodores roster
Pitchers: 11 Tyler Beede - Sophomore; 12 Adam Ravenelle - Sophomore; 13 Walker Buehler - Freshman; 15 Carson Fulmer - Freshman; 19 Steven Rice - Junior; 22 Philip Pfeifer - Sophomore; 24 Nevin Wilson - Sophomore; 27 Keenan Kolinsky - RS Junior; 28 Jared Miller - Sophomore; 31 Chris Raasch - Freshman; 33 Brian Miller - Sophomore; 34 Luke Stephenson - Freshman; 35 Kevin Ziomek - Junior; 40 T.J. Pecoraro - Junior; 45 Tyler Ferguson - Freshman; 46 Pat Delano - Freshman	Infielders: 2 Tyler Campbell - Freshman; 3 Vince Conde - Sophomore; 6 Tony Kemp - Junior; 7 Dansby Swanson - Freshman; 9 Xavier Turner - Freshman; 17 Andrew Harris - RS Senior; 25 D.J. Luna - RS Junior; 39 Kyle Smith - Freshman; 42 Joel McKeithan - Junior; 43 Zander Wiel - RS Freshman; 55 Conrad Gregor - Junior; Catchers: 5 Spencer Navin - Junior; 44 Chris Harvey - Sophomore	Outfielders: 8 Rhett Wiseman - Freshman; 10 John Norwood - Sophomore; 18 Mike Yastrzemski - Senior; 20 Connor Harrell - Senior; 23 Will Cooper - Sophomore; 51 Jack Lupo - RS Senior

== Coaches ==
2013 Vanderbilt Commodores baseball coaching staff
- 4 Tim Corbin - Head Coach (11th season)
- 26 Scott Brown - Pitching Coach (1st season)
- 50 Travis Jewett - Assistant Coach (1st season)
- 30 Larry Day - Volunteer Assistant Coach (5th season)

== Schedule ==
2013 Vanderbilt Commodores baseball game log
Regular season

February
Date	Opponent	Site/stadium	Score	Win	Loss	Save	Attendance	Overall record	SEC record
Feb 15	Long Beach State	Hawkins Field • Nashville, TN	10–4	Ziomek (1–0)	Maciel (0–1)	None	2,233	1–0	0–0
Feb 16	Long Beach State	Hawkins Field • Nashville, TN	12–2	Beede (1–0)	Carle (0–1)	B. Miller (1)	2,287	2–0	0–0
Feb 17	Long Beach State	Hawkins Field • Nashville, TN	9–13 (8)	Millison (1–0)	Pecaroro (0–1)	None	2,282	2–1	0–0
Feb 19	@ Belmont	E. S. Rose Park • Nashville, TN	9–3	Pfeifer (1–0)	Ludwig (0–1)	None	503	3–1	0–0
Feb 20	Central Arkansas	Hawkins Field • Nashville, TN	10–2	Rice (1–0)	Green (0–1)	None	2,101	4–1	0–0
Feb 22	Monmouth (NJ)	Hawkins Field • Nashville, TN	5–1	Ziomek (2–0)	McGee (0–1)	None	2,255	5–1	0–0
Feb 23	Monmouth (NJ)	Hawkins Field • Nashville, TN	11–1	Beede (2–0)	Smith (0–1)	None	2,288	6–1	0–0
Feb 24	Monmouth (NJ)	Hawkins Field • Nashville, TN	13–1	Pfeifer (2–0)	Shippee (0–1)	None	2,464	7–1	0–0
Feb 26	Arkansas State	Hawkins Field • Nashville, TN	7–3	B. Miller (1–0)	McWilliams (2–1)	None	2,147	8–1	0–0
Feb 27	Evansville	Hawkins Field • Nashville, TN	13–0	Ferguson (1–0)	Billo (0–2)	None	2,123	9–1	0–0

March
Date	Opponent	Site/stadium	Score	Win	Loss	Save	Attendance	Overall record	SEC record
Mar 1	UIC	Hawkins Field • Nashville, TN	9–0	Ziomek (3–0)	Michelson (2–1)	None	2,104	10–1	0–0
Mar 2	UIC	Hawkins Field • Nashville, TN	5–3	Beede (3–0)	Andersen (0–3)	B. Miller (2)	2,142	11–1	0–0
Mar 3	UIC	Hawkins Field • Nashville, TN	3–1 (10)	B. Miller (2–0)	Pose (0–1)	None	2,147	12–1	0–0
Mar 5	Eastern Illinois	Hawkins Field • Nashville, TN	8–3	Buehler (1–0)	Widdersheim (1–3)	None	2,179	13–1	0–0
Mar 8	@ #14 Oregon	PK Park • Eugene, OR	4–1	Ziomek (4–0)	Reed (1–3)	None	2,266	14–1	0–0
Mar 9	@ #14 Oregon	PK Park • Eugene, OR	4–2	Beede (4–0)	Thorpe (2–2)	B. Miller (3)	2,764	15–1	0–0
Mar 10	@ #14 Oregon	PK Park • Eugene, OR	5–7	Sherfy (1–0)	J. Miller (0–1)	None	1,816	15–2	0–0
Mar 13	Buffalo	Hawkins Field • Nashville, TN	4–2	Buehler (2–0)	Stephens (0–1)	B. Miller (4)	2,219	16–2	0–0
Mar 15	@ Auburn	Plainsman Park • Auburn, AL	5–2	Ziomek (5–0)	Koger (0–1)	B. Miller (5–0)	2,489	17–2	1–0
Mar 16	@ Auburn	Plainsman Park • Auburn, AL	8–1	Beede (5–0)	O'Neal (4–1)	B. Miller (6)	3,027	18–2	2–0
Mar 17	@ Auburn	Plainsman Park • Auburn, AL	8–6	J. Miller (1–1)	McCord (2–1)	B. Miller (7)	2,650	19–2	3–0
Mar 20	@ Middle Tennessee	Reese Smith Jr. Field • Murfreesboro, TN	1–4	McClung (2–0)	Buehler (2–1)	Palo (3)	1,178	19–3	3–0
Mar 22	Florida	Hawkins Field • Nashville, TN	1–7	Carmichael (3–1)	Ziomek (5–1)	None	2,477	19–4	3–1
Mar 23	Florida	Hawkins Field • Nashville, TN	6–1	Beede (6–0)	Crawford (0–4)	None	2,733	20–4	4–1
Mar 24	Florida	Hawkins Field • Nashville, TN	5–4	B. Miller (3–0)	Harris (3–2)	None	2,484	21–4	5–1
Mar 26	Lipscomb	Hawkins Field • Nashville, TN	4–1	Ferguson (2–0)	Knott (1–3)	B. Miller (8)	2,258	22–4	5–1
Mar 29	Tennessee	Hawkins Field • Nashville, TN	4–3 (12)	B. Miller (4–0)	Charpie (2–1)	None	2,637	23–4	6–1
Mar 30	Tennessee	Hawkins Field • Nashville, TN	8–3	Beede (7–0)	Williams (1–1)	Fulmer (1)	2,762	24–4	7–1
Mar 31	Tennessee	Hawkins Field • Nashville, TN	12–8	J. Miller (2–1)	Charpie (2–2)	Fulmer (2)	2,416	25–4	8–1

April
Date	Opponent	Site/stadium	Score	Win	Loss	Save	Attendance	Overall record	SEC record
Apr 2	Middle Tennessee	Hawkins Field • Nashville, TN	12–3	Rice (2–0)	Cooper (2–2)	None	2,271	26–4	8–1
Apr 5	@ Ole Miss	Swayze Field Oxford, MS	3–1	Ziomek (6–1)	Bailey (1–1)	B. Miller (9)	10,002	27–4	9–1
Apr 6	@ Ole Miss	Swayze Field • Oxford, MS	2–1	Beede (8–0)	Mayers (2–4)	B. Miller (10)	10,851	28–4	10–1
Apr 7	@ Ole Miss	Swayze Field • Oxford, MS	7–6 (11)	B. Miller (5–0)	Hubert (2–1)	None	7,357	29–4	11–1
Apr 9	Tennessee–Martin	Hawkins Field • Nashville, TN	10–3	Ferguson (3–0)	Ross (3–2)	None	2,449	30–4	11–1
Apr 12	Missouri	Hawkins Field • Nashville, TN	11–5	Ziomek (7–1)	Zastryzny (2–6)	None	2,856	31–4	12–1
Apr 13	Missouri	Hawkins Field • Nashville, TN	12–1	Beede (9–0)	Graves (0–5)	None	3,365	32–4	13–1
Apr 14	Missouri	Hawkins Field • Nashville, TN	16–4	Pecoraro (1–1)	Steele (3–2)	None	3,109	33–4	14–1
Apr 16	Tennessee Tech	Hawkins Field • Nashville, TN	9–10	Hess (4–2)	Ferguson (3–1)	Lucio (9)	2,362	33–5	14–1
Apr 20	@ Georgia	Foley Field • Athens, GA	1–3	Dieterich (2–2)	Ziomek (7–2)	Brown (1)		33–6	14–2
Apr 20	@ Georgia	Foley Field • Athens, GA	15–4	Beede (10–0)	Boling (2–5)	None	2,786	34–6	15–2
Apr 21	@ Georgia	Foley Field • Athens, GA	5–1	Fulmer (1–0)	McLaughlin (4–4)	B. Miller (11)	2,221	35–6	16–2
Apr 23	@ #12 Louisville	Jim Patterson Stadium • Louisville, KY	10–2	Buehler (3–1)	McGrath (5–1)	None	2,516	36–6	16–2
Apr 26	#17 Mississippi State	Hawkins Field • Nashville, TN	3–1	Ziomek (8–2)	Pollorena (6–2)	B. Miller (12)	3,423	37–6	17–2
Apr 27	#17 Mississippi State	Hawkins Field • Nashville, TN	5–2	Beede (11–0)	Graveman (5–4)	Fulmer (3)	2,840	38–6	18–2
Apr 28	#17 Mississippi State	Hawkins Field • Nashville, TN	8–3	Pecoraro (2–1)	Lindgren (4–2)	None	3,243	39–6	19–2

May
Date	Opponent	Site/stadium	Score	Win	Loss	Save	Attendance	Overall record	SEC record
May 3	@ #15 South Carolina	Carolina Stadium • Columbia, SC	3–2	Ziomek (9–2)	Belcher (6–5)	B. Miller (13)	8,081	40–6	20–2
May 4	@ #15 South Carolina	Carolina Stadium • Columbia, SC	5–2	Beede (12–0)	Montgomery (3–1)	Fulmer (4)	256	41–6	21–2
May 8	Presbyterian	Hawkins Field • Nashville, TN	5–2	Pecoraro (3–1)	Corbin (2–3)	None	2,473	42–6	21–2
May 11	@ Kentucky	Cliff Hagan Stadium • Lexington, KY	11–3	Ziomek (10–2)	Reed (2–7)	Buehler (1)		43–6	22–2
May 11	@ Kentucky	Cliff Hagan Stadium • Lexington, KY	5–3	Beede (13–0)	Cody (3–3)	J. Miller (1)	2529	44–6	23–2
May 12	@ Kentucky	Cliff Hagan Stadium • Lexington, KY	10–5	Rice (3–0)	Littrell (5–5)	None	1961	45–6	24–2
May 14	Belmont	Hawkins Field • Nashville, TN	6–1	Pfeifer (3–0)	Deal (0–1)	None	2844	46–6	24–2
May 16	Alabama	Hawkins Field • Nashville, TN	7–6	Buehler (4–1)	Sullivan (5–5)	B. Miller (14)	3076	47–6	25–2
May 17	Alabama	Hawkins Field • Nashville, TN	4–5 (10)	Shaw (1–1)	B. Miller (5–1)	Castillo (10)	3357	47–7	25–3
May 18	Alabama	Hawkins Field • Nashville, TN	14–10	Rice (4–1)	Guilbeau (4–2)	Pecoraro (1)	3377	48–7	26–3

Postseason

SEC Tournament
Date	Opponent	Site/stadium	Score	Win	Loss	Save	Attendance	Overall record	SECT Record
May 22	Texas A&M	Regions Park • Hoover, AL	0–5	Ray (1–1)	Buehler (4–2)	None		48–8	0–1
May 23	#15 South Carolina	Regions Park • Hoover, AL	4–3 (10)	Fulmer (2–0)	Westmoreland (3–3)	None	5705	49–8	1–1
May 24	Texas A&M	Regions Park • Hoover, AL	3–0	Beede (14–0)	Long (4–2)	B. Miller (15)	11207	50–8	2–1
May 25	#18 Mississippi State	Regions Park • Hoover, AL	16–8	Pecoraro (4–1)	Lindgren (4–3)	J. Miller (2)	11963	51–8	3–1
May 26	#2 LSU	Regions Park • Hoover, AL	4–5 (11)	Cotton (4–1)	B. Miller (5–2)	None	10590	51–9	3–2

NCAA tournament: Nashville Regional
Date	Opponent	Site/stadium	Score	Win	Loss	Save	Attendance	Overall record	NCAAT record
May 31	East Tennessee State	Hawkins Field • Nashville, TN	9–1	Ziomek (11–2)	Nesselt (2–3)	None	3503	52–9	1–0
June 1	Illinois	Hawkins Field • Nashville, TN	10–4	Fulmer (3–0)	Kravetz (5–3)	None	3279	53–9	2–0
June 2	Georgia Tech	Hawkins Field • Nashville, TN	0–5	Heddinger (3–0)	Buehler (4–3)	None	3502	53–10	2–1
June 2	Georgia Tech	Hawkins Field • Nashville, TN	7–1	Pfeifer (4–0)	Farmer (9–5)	B. Miller (16)	3503	54–10	3–1

NCAA tournament: Nashville Super Regional
Date	Opponent	Site/stadium	Score	Win	Loss	Save	Attendance	Overall record	NCAAT record
June 8	#8 Louisville	Hawkins Field • Nashville, TN	3-5	Kime (6–1)	Ziomek (11–3)	Burdi (16)	3503	54-11	3–2
June 9	#8 Louisville	Hawkins Field • Nashville, TN	1-2	Thompson (11–1)	Beede (14–1)	Ege (1)	3503	54-12	3-3

== Record vs. conference opponents ==
Last two do not qualify for conf. tourn. Blank are not scheduled. Blue are home games, otherwise away.

2013 SEC baseball records Source: 2013 SEC baseball game results, 2013 SEC baseball schedule
Team	W–L	ALA	ARK	AUB	FLA	UGA	KEN	LSU	MSU	MIZZ	MISS	SCAR	TENN	TAMU	VAN	Team	Div	SR	SW
ALA	14–15		1–2	2–1	.	3–0	.	1–2	0–3	2–1	0–3	.	2–1	2–0	1–2	ALA	W5	5–5	1–2
ARK	18–11	2–1		1–2	.	2–0	2–1	1–2	2–1	.	1–2	3–0	2–1	2–1	.	ARK	W2	7–3	1–0
AUB	13–17	1–2	2–1		2–1	2–1	.	0–3	1–2	1–2	2–1	.	.	2–1	0–3	AUB	W7	5–5	0–2
FLA	14–16	.	.	1–2		1–2	1–2	0–3	1–2	2–1	2–1	3–0	2–1	.	1–2	FLA	E3	4–6	1–1
UGA	7–20	0–3	0–2	1–2	2–1		1–2	.	.	1–2	.	0–3	1–0	0–3	1–2	UGA	E7	1–8	0–3
KEN	11–19	.	1–2	.	2–1	2–1		0–3	2–1	1–2	2–1	0–3	1–2	.	0–3	KEN	E4	4–6	0–3
LSU	23–7	2–1	2–1	3–0	3–0	.	3–0		2–1	3–0	2–1	1–2	.	2–1	.	LSU	W1	9–1	4–0
MSU	16–14	3–0	1–2	2–1	2–1	.	1–2	1–2		.	1–2	2–1	.	3–0	0–3	MSU	W3	5–5	2–1
MIZZ	10–20	1–2	.	2–1	1–2	2–1	2–1	0–3	.		.	1–2	1–2	0–3	0–3	MIZZ	E5	3–7	0–3
MISS	15–15	3–0	2–1	1–2	1–2	.	1–2	1–2	2–1	.		.	3–0	1–2	0–3	MISS	W4	4–6	2–1
SCAR	17–12	.	0–3	.	0–3	3–0	3–0	2–1	1–2	2–1	.		3–0	3–0	0–2	SCAR	E2	6–4	4–2
TENN	8–20	1–2	1–2	.	1–2	0–1	2–1	.	.	2–1	0–3	0–3		1–2	0–3	TENN	E6	2–7	0–3
TAMU	13–16	0–2	1–2	1–2	.	3–0	.	1–2	0–3	3–0	2–1	0–3	2–1		.	TAMU	W6	4–6	2–2
VAN	26–3	2–1	.	3–0	2–1	2–1	3–0	.	3–0	3–0	3–0	2–0	3–0	.		VAN	E1	10–0	6–0
Team	W–L	ALA	ARK	AUB	FLA	UGA	KEN	LSU	MSU	MIZZ	MISS	SCAR	TENN	TAMU	VAN	Team	Div	SR	SW

Updated for entire regular season.

== Ranking movements ==
Ranking movements Legend: ██ Increase in ranking ██ Decrease in ranking
	Week																			
Poll	Pre	1	2	3	4	5	6	7	8	9	10	11	12	13	14	15	16	17	18	Final
Coaches'	8	8*	3	2	3	2	5	3	3	3	4	2	2	1	1	2				
Baseball America	2	2	2	2	2	2	3	2	2	2	3	2	2	1	1	1				
Collegiate Baseball^	3	3	3	2	4	4	7	3	3	3	4	1	1	1	1	2				
NCBWA†	4	4	3	2	2	2	5	3	3	3	4	1	1	1	1	2				

^ Collegiate Baseball ranked 40 teams in their preseason poll, but only ranked 30 teams weekly during the season.
† NCBWA ranks 30 teams in their preseason poll, but only ranks 25 teams weekly during the season.
* A new poll was not released for this week, so for comparison purposes, the previous week's ranking is inserted in this week's slot.
