= 2013 Arkansas Razorbacks baseball team =

American college baseball season

2013 Arkansas Razorbacks baseball

Manhattan Regional, 2–2
- Conference: Southeastern Conference
- West

Ranking
- Coaches: No. 18
- CB: No. 18
- Record: 39–22 (18-11 SEC)
- Head coach: Dave Van Horn
- Hitting coach: Todd Butler
- Pitching coach: Dave Jorn
- Home stadium: Baum Stadium

2013 Southeastern Conference baseball standings
	Conf.				Overall
Team	W		L	PCT	W		L	PCT
Eastern
No. 9 Vanderbilt ^{x}‍†‍‍^{y}	26	–	3	.897	54	–	12	.818
No. 13 South Carolina ‍‍‍^{y}	17	–	12	.586	43	–	20	.683
Florida ‍‍‍^{y}	14	–	16	.467	29	–	30	.492
Kentucky ‍‍‍	11	–	19	.367	30	–	25	.545
Missouri ‍‍‍	10	–	20	.333	18	–	32	.360
Tennessee ‍‍‍	8	–	20	.286	22	–	30	.423
Georgia ‍‍‍	7	–	20	.259	21	–	32	.396
Western
No. 7 LSU ^{x}‍‍‡‍^{y}	23	–	7	.767	57	–	11	.838
No. 18 Arkansas ‍‍‍^{y}	18	–	11	.621	39	–	22	.639
No. 2 Mississippi State ‍‍‍^{y}	16	–	14	.533	51	–	20	.718
Ole Miss ‍‍‍^{y}	15	–	15	.500	38	–	24	.613
Alabama ‍‍‍^{y}	14	–	15	.483	35	–	28	.556
Texas A&M ‍‍‍^{y}	13	–	16	.448	34	–	29	.540
Auburn ‍‍‍	13	–	17	.433	33	–	23	.589
x – Division champion † – Conference champion ‡ – Tournament champion y – Invited to the NCAA tournament As of June 26, 2013; Rankings from Collegiate Baseball

The 2013 Arkansas Razorbacks baseball team represented the University of Arkansas in baseball at the Division I level in the NCAA for the 2013 season. Dave van Horn was the coach and completed his eleventh year at his alma mater. During the season, he won his 1,000th game as a collegiate head coach.

== Coaches ==
2013 Arkansas Razorbacks baseball coaching staff
- 2 Dave van Horn - Head coach
- 22 Todd Butler - Hitting coach
- 31 Dave Jorn - Pitching coach
- 21 Brian Walker - Volunteer assistant coach
- -- Jacob Julius - Student assistant coach

Source: arkansasrazorbacks.com

== Schedule ==
2013 Game Log
Regular season

#	Date	Opponent	Location	Score	Win	Loss	Save	Attendance	Record	SEC
1	2/15/13	Western Illinois	Baum Stadium	9–1	Stanek (1–0)	Smith (0–1)	-	7,712	1–0	0–0
2	2/16/13	Western Illinois	Baum Stadium	7–2	Astin (1–0)	Willman (0–1)		7,270	2–0	0–0
3	2/17/13	Western Illinois	Baum Stadium	5–7	Pingel (1–0)	Daniel (0–1)	Loconsole (1)	8,787	2–1	0–0
4	2/19/13	New Orleans	Baum Stadium	14-0 (7)	Poche (1-0)	Martinez (0-1)		DH	3–1	0–0
5	2/19/13	New Orleans	Baum Stadium	3–0	Simpson (1–0)	Prest (0–1)	Beeks (1)	6,913	4–1	0–0
6	2/22/13	Evansville	Baum Stadium	10–4	Moore (1–0)	Freeland (1–1)		6,955	5–1	0–0
7	2/23/13	Evansville	Baum Stadium	5–2	Beeks (1–0)	Isom (0–2)	Daniel (1)	7,652	6–1	0–0
8	2/24/13	Evansville	Baum Stadium	10–2	Killian (1–0)	Lloyd (0–1)		7,825	7–1	0–0
Coca-Cola Classic, Surprise, Arizona
9	2/28/13	vs. Arizona State	Surprise Stadium	2-3	Lilek (1-0)	Stanek (1-1)	Burr (1)	714	7-2	0-0
10	3/1/13	vs. Gonzaga	Surprise Stadium	0-3	Gonzales (2-1)	Astin (1-1)		427	7-3	0-0
11	3/2/13	vs. Arizona State	Surprise Stadium	1-3	Blackford (1-0)	Killian (1-1)	Burr (2)	1,560	7-4	0-0
12	3/3/13	vs. Pacific	Surprise Stadium	3-4	Hamman (1-0)	Moore (1-1)		179	7-5	0-0
13	3/7/13	San Diego State	Baum Stadium	2-0	Poche (2-0)	Cederoth (1-2)	Astin (1)	7,153	8-5	0-0
14	3/8/13	San Diego State	Baum Stadium	4-3	Beeks (2-0)	Hepner (0-1)		7,502	9-5	0-0
15	3/9/13	San Diego State	Baum Stadium	8-2	Killian (2-1)	Doran (2-2)		DH	10-5	0-0
16	3/10/13	San Diego State	Baum Stadium	4-1	Gunn (1-0)	Derby (1-1)		8,656	11-5	0-0
17	3/12/13	Alabama A&M	Baum Stadium	20-2	Altimont (1-0)	Tucker (1-2)	Simpson (1)	6,922	12-5	0-0
18	3/13/13	Alabama A&M	Baum Stadium	13-0	Oliver (1-0)	Belue (0-2)		6,724	13-5	0-0
19	3/15/13	#8 Ole Miss	Baum Stadium	1-7	Wahl (5-0)	Killian (2-2)		8,934	13-6	0-1
20	3/16/13	#8 Ole Miss	Baum Stadium	10-1	Fant (1-0)	Mayers (2-1)		9,861	14-6	1-1
21	3/17/13	#8 Ole Miss	Baum Stadium	4-6 (13)	Huber (2-0)	Moore (1-2)		7,603	14-7	1-2
22	3/22/13	at #6 South Carolina	Carolina Stadium	15-3	Astin (2-1)	Beal (2-1)		7,616	15-7	2-2
23	3/23/13	at # 6 South Carolina	Carolina Stadium	4-2	Stanek (2-1)	Belcher (4-2)		7,509	16-7	3-2
24	3/24/13	at #6 South Carolina	Carolina Stadium	5-3 (11)	Killian (3-2)	Webb (0-1)	Suggs (1)	7,208	17-7	4-2
25	3/26/13	Mississippi Valley State	Baum Stadium	6-0	Poche (3-0)	Lacy (0-3)		6,688	18-7	4-2
26	3/27/13	Mississippi Valley State	Baum Stadium	2-1	Wright (1-0)	Killier (1-5)	Beeks (2)	9,285	19-7	4-2
27	3/29/13	#15 Mississippi State	Baum Stadium	5-4	Beeks (3-0)	Pollorena (4-1)	Suggs (2)	7,845	20-7	5-2
28	3/30/13	#15 Mississippi State	Baum Stadium	1-4	Graveman (3-2)	Stanek (2-2)		8,742	20-8	5-3
29	3/31/13	#15 Mississippi State	Baum Stadium	3-1	Fant (2-0)	Bracewell (0-1)	Suggs (3)	7,722	21-8	6-3
30	4/4/13	at Alabama	Sewell-Thomas Stadium	3-1	Beeks (4-0)	Sullivan (3-2)	Suggs (4)	2,990	22-8	7-3
31	4/5/13	at Alabama	Sewell-Thomas Stadium	6-0	Stanek (3-2)	Keller (3-4)		3,787	23-8	8-3
32	4/6/13	at Alabama	Sewell-Thomas Stadium	0-5	Turnbull (4-1)	Fant (2-1)		3,470	23-9	8-4
33	4/9/13	New Mexico	Baum Stadium	0-3	Bridges (2-1)	Wright (1-1)		DH	23-10	8-4
34	4/9/13	New Mexico	Baum Stadium	4-3	Oliver (2-0)	McClain (1-1)		7,215	24-10	8-4
35	4/12/13	#2 LSU	Baum Stadium	2-6	Nola (6-0)	Astin (2-2)		10,167	24-11	8-5
36	4/13/13	#2 LSU	Baum Stadium	8-3	Stanek (4-2)	Eades (7-1)		10,377	25-11	9-5
37	4/14/13	#2 LSU	Baum Stadium	3-5 (10)	Cotton (2-0)	Oliver (2-1)		10,180	25-12	9-6
38	4/16/13	at Nebraska	Haymarket Park	0-3	Kubat (1-0)	Killian (3-3)	Vogt (6)	DH	25-13	9-6
39	4/16/13	at Nebraska	Haymarket Park	2-4	Bublitz (2-0)	Oliver (2-2)	Roeder (2)	2,563	25-14	9-6
40	4/19/13	Texas A&M	Baum Stadium	3-5	Brashear (1-1)	Beeks (4-1)	Jester (10)	9,064	25-15	9-7
41	4/20/13	Texas A&M	Baum Stadium	12-2	Stanek (5-2)	Kent (2-2)	Gunn (1)	11,145	26-15	10-7
42	4/21/13	Texas A&M	Baum Stadium	2-1	Fant (3-1)	Pineda (3-4)	Suggs (5)	9,012	27-15	11-7
43	4/26/13	at Georgia	Foley Field	2-0	Astin (3-2)	Boling (2-6)	Suggs (6)	2,043	28-15	12-7
44	4/27/13	at Georgia	Foley Field	2-1	Beeks (5-1)	McLaughlin (4-5)	Suggs (7)	1,802	29-15	13-7
	4/28/13	at Georgia	Foley Field	Postponed (rain)						
45	4/30/13	Missouri State	Baum Stadium	6-3	Fant (4-1)	Hall (4-2)	Suggs (8)	4,268	30-15	13-7
46	5/3/13	at Kentucky	Cliff Hagan Stadium	2-1	Astin (4-2)	Reed (2-6)	Suggs (9)	2,336	31-15	14-7
47	5/4/13	at Kentucky	Cliff Hagan Stadium	5-3	Stanek (6-2)	Littrell (5-4)	Suggs (10)	DH	32-15	15-7
48	5/4/13	at Kentucky	Cliff Hagan Stadium	3-4	Shepherd (4-0)	Simpson (1-1)		1,794	32-16	15-8
49	5/10/13	Tennessee	Baum Stadium	3-8	Godley (5-6)	Astin (4-3)		9,110	32-17	15-9
50	5/11/13	Tennessee	Baum Stadium	11-1	Stanek (7-2)	Williams (2-4)		9,639	33-17	16-9
51	5/12/13	Tennessee	Baum Stadium	10-2	Fant (5-1)	Quillen (2-4)		8,523	34-17	17-9
52	5/16/13	at Auburn	Plainsman Park	0-3	Kendrick (5-3)	Astin (4-4)	Dedrick (9)	2,631	34-18	17-10
53	5/17/13	at Auburn	Plainsman Park	1-0	Stanek (8-2)	O'Neal (8-4)	Suggs (11)	3,631	35-18	18-10
54	5/18/13	at Auburn	Plainsman Park	6-11	Cochran-Gill (1-1)	Moore (1-3)	Dedrick (10)	2,481	35-19	18-11

SEC Tournament

#	Date	Opponent	Location	Score	Win	Loss	Save	Record	Tournament Record
55	5/22/13	vs. #21 Ole Miss	Hoover Metropolitan Stadium	2-1	Beeks (6-1)	Greenwood (3-5)		36-19	1-0
56	5/23/13	vs. #2 LSU	Hoover Metropolitan Stadium	4-1	Stanek (9-2)	Bourgeois (3-2)	Suggs (12)	37-19	2-0
57	5/25/13	vs. #2 LSU	Hoover Metropolitan Stadium	1-3	LaMarche (2-0)	Moore (1-4)	Cotton (15)	37-20	2-1

NCAA tournament: Regional

#	Date	Opponent	Location	Score	Win	Loss	Save	Att	Record	NCAAT Record
58	5/31/13	vs. Bryant	Tointon Family Stadium	1-4	Lisanti (2-2)	Beeks (6-2)		2,107	37-21	0-1
59	6/1/13	vs. Wichita State	Tointon Family Stadium	3-1	Stanek (10-2)	Ladwig (5-6)	Suggs (13)	2,295	38-21	1-1
60	6/2/13	vs. Bryant	Tointon Family Stadium	12-3	Fant (6-1)	McAvoy (7-3)		2,467	39-21	2-1
61	6/2/13	vs. #17 Kansas State	Tointon Family Stadium	3-4	Esquivel (2-2)	Gunn (1-1)	Matthys (9)	2,661	39-22	2-2

== February ==
=== Western Illinois ===
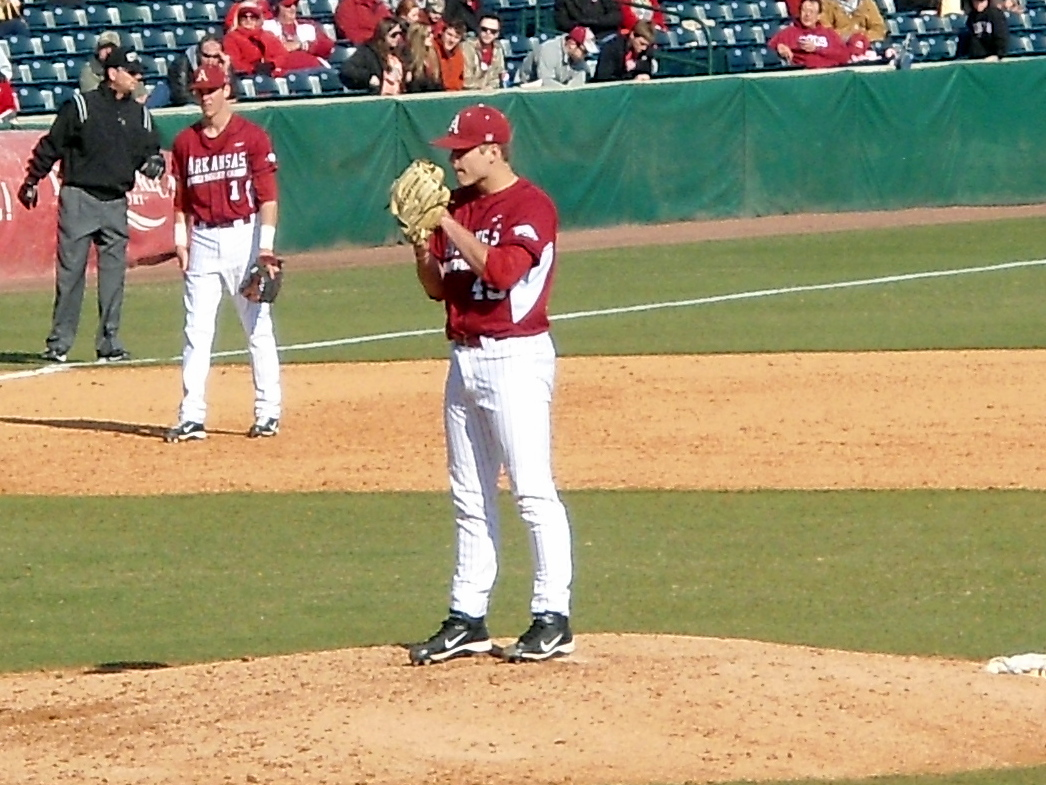
Jalen Beeks, a relief pitcher from Prairie Grove, Arkansas, made his Razorbacks debut in game two with Western Illinois

The Razorbacks began the 2013 campaign with a 9–1 victory over the Western Illinois Leathernecks at Baum Stadium. First baseman Eric Fisher, a redshirt sophomore, hit his first collegiate home run in the game, with Jacob Mahan and Brian Anderson both going 2 for 2 at the plate. The following day, the Razorbacks took a 7–2 victory over the Leathernecks with starting pitcher Barrett Astin getting the win. Matt Vinson and Joe Serrano each had 2-RBI singles. Sophomore pitcher Jalen Beeks made his first appearance for the Razorbacks in relief. Trent Daniel gave up six runs (three earned) and received the loss as Western Illinois took the third game, 7–5. The Razorbacks subsequently dropped from #1 in the Baseball America, Collegiate Baseball, and NCBWA polls.

=== New Orleans ===
Although scheduled to be a two-day series, the Razorbacks and New Orleans Privateers decided to reschedule and play a doubleheader on February 19.

== Record vs. conference opponents ==
Last two do not qualify for conf. tourn. Blank are not scheduled. Blue are home games, otherwise away.

2013 SEC baseball records Source: 2013 SEC baseball game results, 2013 SEC baseball schedule
Team	W–L	ALA	ARK	AUB	FLA	UGA	KEN	LSU	MSU	MIZZ	MISS	SCAR	TENN	TAMU	VAN	Team	Div	SR	SW
ALA	14–15		1–2	2–1	.	3–0	.	1–2	0–3	2–1	0–3	.	2–1	2–0	1–2	ALA	W5	5–5	1–2
ARK	18–11	2–1		1–2	.	2–0	2–1	1–2	2–1	.	1–2	3–0	2–1	2–1	.	ARK	W2	7–3	1–0
AUB	13–17	1–2	2–1		2–1	2–1	.	0–3	1–2	1–2	2–1	.	.	2–1	0–3	AUB	W7	5–5	0–2
FLA	14–16	.	.	1–2		1–2	1–2	0–3	1–2	2–1	2–1	3–0	2–1	.	1–2	FLA	E3	4–6	1–1
UGA	7–20	0–3	0–2	1–2	2–1		1–2	.	.	1–2	.	0–3	1–0	0–3	1–2	UGA	E7	1–8	0–3
KEN	11–19	.	1–2	.	2–1	2–1		0–3	2–1	1–2	2–1	0–3	1–2	.	0–3	KEN	E4	4–6	0–3
LSU	23–7	2–1	2–1	3–0	3–0	.	3–0		2–1	3–0	2–1	1–2	.	2–1	.	LSU	W1	9–1	4–0
MSU	16–14	3–0	1–2	2–1	2–1	.	1–2	1–2		.	1–2	2–1	.	3–0	0–3	MSU	W3	5–5	2–1
MIZZ	10–20	1–2	.	2–1	1–2	2–1	2–1	0–3	.		.	1–2	1–2	0–3	0–3	MIZZ	E5	3–7	0–3
MISS	15–15	3–0	2–1	1–2	1–2	.	1–2	1–2	2–1	.		.	3–0	1–2	0–3	MISS	W4	4–6	2–1
SCAR	17–12	.	0–3	.	0–3	3–0	3–0	2–1	1–2	2–1	.		3–0	3–0	0–2	SCAR	E2	6–4	4–2
TENN	8–20	1–2	1–2	.	1–2	0–1	2–1	.	.	2–1	0–3	0–3		1–2	0–3	TENN	E6	2–7	0–3
TAMU	13–16	0–2	1–2	1–2	.	3–0	.	1–2	0–3	3–0	2–1	0–3	2–1		.	TAMU	W6	4–6	2–2
VAN	26–3	2–1	.	3–0	2–1	2–1	3–0	.	3–0	3–0	3–0	2–0	3–0	.		VAN	E1	10–0	6–0
Team	W–L	ALA	ARK	AUB	FLA	UGA	KEN	LSU	MSU	MIZZ	MISS	SCAR	TENN	TAMU	VAN	Team	Div	SR	SW

Updated for entire regular season.

== Rankings ==
Ranking movements Legend: ██ Increase in ranking ██ Decrease in ranking
	Week																			
Poll	Pre	1	2	3	4	5	6	7	8	9	10	11	12	13	14	15	16	17	18	Final
Coaches'	1	1*	2	19	15	17	13	12	10	12	15	14	14	13	15	15*	15*	15*	15*	18
Baseball America	3	3	3	16	15	21	15	14	10	12	14	14	11	11	14	12	12*	12*	12*	18
Collegiate Baseball^	1	2	2	29	22	28	12	11	10	13	16	16	12	12	12	12	18	18	18	18
NCBWA†	1	3	2	16	11	16	11	9	8	10	15	16	14	13	18	17	18	17	18	18

^ Collegiate Baseball ranked 40 teams in their preseason poll, but only ranked 30 teams weekly during the season.
† NCBWA ranks 30 teams in their preseason poll, but only ranks 25 teams weekly during the season.
* A new poll was not released for this week, so for comparison purposes, the previous week's ranking is inserted in this week's slot.

== Razorbacks in the 2013 MLB draft ==
Player	Position	Round	Overall	MLB team
Dominic Ficociello	IF	12	366	Detroit Tigers
Trent Daniel	LHP	17	499	Colorado Rockies
Brandon Moore	RHP	17	512	Milwaukee Brewers
Jacob Morris	OF	24	723	Chicago White Sox
Tyler Wright	LHP	26	777	Seattle Mariners
Randall Fant	LHP	29	857	Houston Astros
Eric Fisher	IF	30	892	Miami Marlins
Matt Vinson	OF	37	1110	Arizona Diamondbacks
