= 2013 Florida Gators baseball team =

American baseball team

2013 Florida Gators baseball

Bloomington Regional, 0–2
- Conference: Southeastern Conference
- Record: 29–30 (14–16 SEC)
- Head coach: Kevin O'Sullivan (6th year)
- Assistant coach: Craig Bell (6th year); Brad Weitzel (6th year)
- Home stadium: Alfred A. McKethan Stadium

2013 Southeastern Conference baseball standings
	Conf.				Overall
Team	W		L	PCT	W		L	PCT
Eastern
No. 9 Vanderbilt ^{x}‍†‍‍^{y}	26	–	3	.897	54	–	12	.818
No. 13 South Carolina ‍‍‍^{y}	17	–	12	.586	43	–	20	.683
Florida ‍‍‍^{y}	14	–	16	.467	29	–	30	.492
Kentucky ‍‍‍	11	–	19	.367	30	–	25	.545
Missouri ‍‍‍	10	–	20	.333	18	–	32	.360
Tennessee ‍‍‍	8	–	20	.286	22	–	30	.423
Georgia ‍‍‍	7	–	20	.259	21	–	32	.396
Western
No. 7 LSU ^{x}‍‍‡‍^{y}	23	–	7	.767	57	–	11	.838
No. 18 Arkansas ‍‍‍^{y}	18	–	11	.621	39	–	22	.639
No. 2 Mississippi State ‍‍‍^{y}	16	–	14	.533	51	–	20	.718
Ole Miss ‍‍‍^{y}	15	–	15	.500	38	–	24	.613
Alabama ‍‍‍^{y}	14	–	15	.483	35	–	28	.556
Texas A&M ‍‍‍^{y}	13	–	16	.448	34	–	29	.540
Auburn ‍‍‍	13	–	17	.433	33	–	23	.589
x – Division champion † – Conference champion ‡ – Tournament champion y – Invited to the NCAA tournament As of June 26, 2013; Rankings from Collegiate Baseball

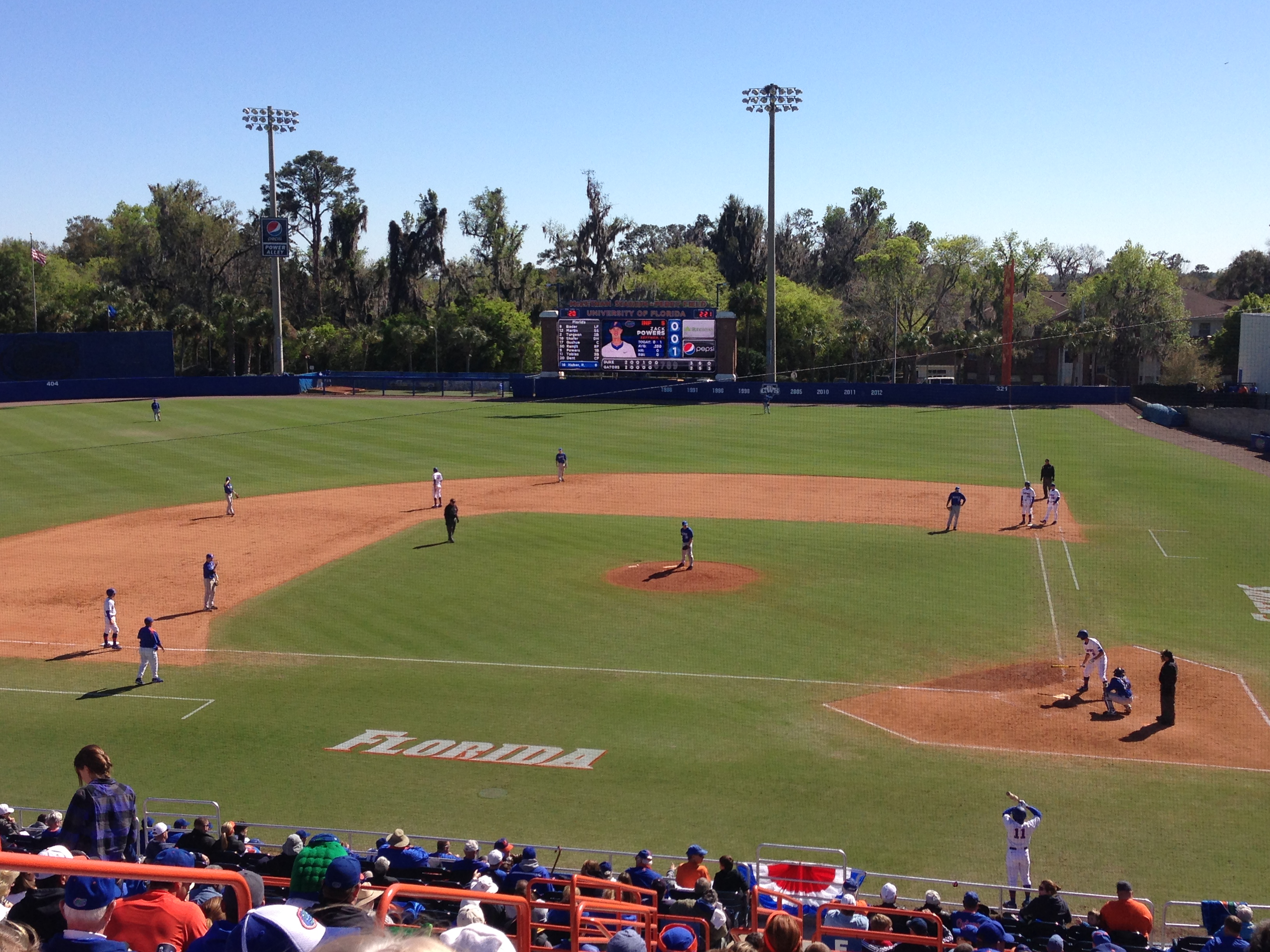
The 2013 Florida Gators baseball team in action against Duke on February 17.

The 2013 Florida Gators baseball team represented the University of Florida in the sport of baseball during the 2013 college baseball season. The Gators competed in Division I of the National Collegiate Athletic Association (NCAA) and the Eastern Division of the Southeastern Conference (SEC). They played their home games at Alfred A. McKethan Stadium, on the university's Gainesville, Florida campus. The team was coached by Kevin O'Sullivan, who was in his sixth season at Florida. The Gators entered the season looking to build upon their appearance in the 2012 College World Series, where they were eliminated after two consecutive losses to South Carolina and Kent State.

The Gators suffered from inexperience for much of the season and experienced key injuries to their pitching staff. As a result, the team struggled to a record of 11–16 by mid-season. From that point forward however, the Gators climbed their way back into postseason contention by winning 14 out of 18 games including a series win over No. 11 Ole Miss, a series sweep over No. 8 South Carolina, and a road win over No. 7 Florida State. Despite struggling once again toward the end of the season, the Gators earned a berth in the 2013 NCAA tournament as a No. 3 seed in the Bloomington, Indiana regional where they were eliminated after consecutive losses to Austin Peay and Valparaiso. The team finished with their first losing record since 2007.

== Roster ==
2013 Florida Gators baseball team
Players
Coaches

#	Pos.	Name	B/T	Height	Weight	Year	Home town
18	OF	Raphael Andrades	R/R	6 ft 0 in (1.83 m)	190 lb (86 kg)	Fr	Tallahassee, FL
8	OF	Harrison Bader	R/R	5 ft 11 in (1.8 m)	180 lb (82 kg)	Fr	Bronxville, NY
4	RHP	Jason Carmichael	R/R	6 ft 2 in (1.88 m)	160 lb (73 kg)	Fr	Cape Coral, FL
23	RHP	Jonathon Crawford	R/R	6 ft 2 in (1.88 m)	205 lb (93 kg)	Jr	Okeechobee, FL
55	LHP	Parker Danciu	L/L	6 ft 3 in (1.91 m)	210 lb (95 kg)	Fr	Delray Beach, FL
20	INF	Cody Dent	L/R	6 ft 0 in (1.83 m)	190 lb (86 kg)	Sr	Boynton Beach, FL
3	OF	Christian Dicks	L/L	5 ft 10 in (1.78 m)	190 lb (86 kg)	Fr	Jacksonville, FL
29	C	Mike Fahrman	R/R	6 ft 0 in (1.83 m)	200 lb (91 kg)	So	Tampa, FL
37	OF	Cody Fulton	R/R	6 ft 0 in (1.83 m)	180 lb (82 kg)	Fr	Davie, FL
6	LHP	Daniel Gibson	L/L	6 ft 3 in (1.91 m)	220 lb (100 kg)	Jr	Lutz, FL
17	C	Taylor Gushue	S/R	6 ft 2 in (1.88 m)	205 lb (93 kg)	So	Boca Raton, FL
25	RHP	Eric Hanhold	R/R	6 ft 5 in (1.96 m)	195 lb (88 kg)	Fr	Palm Harbor, FL
24	RHP	Ryan Harris	R/R	6 ft 2 in (1.88 m)	200 lb (91 kg)	So	Jupiter, FL
31	C	Todd Haskel	R/R	5 ft 11 in (1.8 m)	190 lb (86 kg)	Jr	Palm Harbor, FL
28	RHP	Keenan Kish (injured)	L/R	6 ft 4 in (1.93 m)	205 lb (93 kg)	Jr	Worcester, PA
45	RHP	Johnny Magliozzi	R/R	5 ft 10 in (1.78 m)	180 lb (82 kg)	So	East Milton, MA
12	INF	Richie Martin	R/R	6 ft 0 in (1.83 m)	180 lb (82 kg)	Fr	Brandon, FL
13	OF	Connor Mitchell	L/R	6 ft 0 in (1.83 m)	185 lb (84 kg)	Fr	Tampa, FL
5	INF	Zack Powers	L/R	6 ft 3 in (1.91 m)	200 lb (91 kg)	RS So	Seffner, FL
14	LHP	Bobby Poyner	L/L	6 ft 0 in (1.83 m)	200 lb (91 kg)	So	Wellington, FL
30	INF	Vickash Ramjit (C)	R/R	6 ft 3 in (1.91 m)	205 lb (93 kg)	Sr	Miami, FL
39	INF	Taylor Ratliff	L/R	6 ft 1 in (1.85 m)	165 lb (75 kg)	Jr	Perry, FL
26	OF	Cory Reid	R/R	6 ft 2 in (1.88 m)	200 lb (91 kg)	RS Fr	Port St. Lucie, FL
27	RHP	Aaron Rhodes	L/R	5 ft 11 in (1.8 m)	190 lb (86 kg)	RS Fr	Venice, FL
9	INF	Brady Roberson	R/R	5 ft 10 in (1.78 m)	195 lb (88 kg)	Fr	Royal Palm Beach, FL
16	OF	Justin Shafer	R/R	6 ft 2 in (1.88 m)	195 lb (88 kg)	So	Lake Wales, FL
10	RHP	Tucker Simpson	R/R	6 ft 6 in (1.98 m)	220 lb (100 kg)	Fr	Oxford, AL
21	LHP	Corey Stump (injured)	L/L	6 ft 5 in (1.96 m)	210 lb (95 kg)	So	Lakeland, FL
32	C	Kevin Stypulkowski	S/R	6 ft 2 in (1.88 m)	210 lb (95 kg)	Fr	Lake Worth, FL
11	INF	Josh Tobias	S/R	5 ft 10 in (1.78 m)	200 lb (91 kg)	So	Greensboro, NC
2	INF	Casey Turgeon	L/R	5 ft 9 in (1.75 m)	170 lb (77 kg)	So	Palm Harbor, FL
40	RHP	Mike Vinson	R/R	6 ft 4 in (1.93 m)	205 lb (93 kg)	Fr	Miami, FL
22	RHP	Karsten Whitson (injured)	R/R	6 ft 4 in (1.93 m)	215 lb (98 kg)	Jr	Chipley, FL
15	LHP	Danny Young	L/L	6 ft 2 in (1.88 m)	185 lb (84 kg)	Fr	Boca Raton, FL

Head coach

7 Kevin O'Sullivan

Assistant coach(es)

33 Craig Bell
42 Brad Weitzel

Legend

- (C) Team captain
- (S) Suspended
- (I) Ineligible
- Injured
- Current redshirt

== Schedule ==
2013 Florida Gators baseball game log
Regular season
February

Date	Opponent	Rank	Stadium Site	Score	Win	Loss	Save	Attendance	Overall Record	SEC Record
February 15	Duke	No. 13	McKethan Stadium	3–4	Huber (1–0)	Stump (0–1)	Istler (1)	5,771	0–1	–
February 16	Duke	No. 13	McKethan Stadium	4–2	Danciu (1–0)	Van Orden (0–1)	Magliozzi (1)	3,890	1–1	–
February 17	Duke	No. 13	McKethan Stadium	16–5	Harris (1–0)	Matuella (0–1)	None	3,581	2–1	–
February 19	at UCF	No. 13	Jay Bergman Field; Orlando, FL	5–3	Danciu (2–0)	Adkins (0–1)	Magliozzi (2)	3,678	3–1	–
February 20	Georgia Southern	No. 13	McKethan Stadium	7–8^{12}	Rowe (1–0)	Stump (0–2)	None	2,759	3–2	–
February 22	Florida Gulf Coast	No. 13	McKethan Stadium	2–8	Knapp (2–0)	Crawford (0–1)	None	3,643	3–3	–
February 23	Florida Gulf Coast	No. 13	McKethan Stadium	3–8	Bixler (1–0)	Simpson (0–1)	Brown (1)	3,901	3–4	–
February 24	Florida Gulf Coast	No. 13	McKethan Stadium	4–7^{11}	Cooney (1–1)	Shafer (0–1)	None	3,133	3–5	–
February 26	North Florida		McKethan Stadium	6–7^{10}	Incinelli (2–0)	Harris (1–1)	Olmstead (1)	2,771	3–6	–

March

Date	Opponent	Rank	Stadium Site	Score	Win	Loss	Save	Attendance	Overall Record	SEC Record
March 1	No. 21 Miami (FL); Rivalry		McKethan Stadium	2–3	Nedeljkovic (2–0)	Carmichael (0–1)	Salcines (2)	3,412	3–7	–
March 2	No. 21 Miami (FL); Rivalry		McKethan Stadium	6–4	Magliozzi (1–0)	Salcines (2–1)	None	3,899	4–7	–
March 3	No. 21 Miami (FL); Rivalry		McKethan Stadium	6–3	Carmichael (1–1)	Suarez (1–1)	None	3,786	5–7	–
March 5	at Jacksonville		Sessions Stadium; Jacksonville, FL	8–5	Magliozzi (2–0)	Baker (0–2)	None	2,104	6–7	–
March 6	Jacksonville		McKethan Stadium	7–6	Harris (2–1)	Woods (0–1)	None	2,395	7–7	–
March 8	Indiana		McKethan Stadium	1–4	DeNato (2–1)	Crawford (0–2)	Effross (1)	2,828	7–8	–
March 9	Indiana		McKethan Stadium	6–4	Carmichael (2–1)	Harrison (0–1)	Magliozzi (3)	3,380	8–8	–
March 10	Indiana		McKethan Stadium	4–7	Hart (2–0)	Hanhold (0–1)	None	3,403	8–9	–
March 12	No. 5 Florida State; Rivalry		McKethan Stadium	1–4	Weaver (3–0)	Young (0–1)	None	4,709	8–10	–
March 15	No. 10 Kentucky		McKethan Stadium	4–1	Harris (3–1)	Reed (2–2)	Magliozzi (4)	3,540	9–10	1–0
March 16	No. 10 Kentucky		McKethan Stadium	5–11	Grundy (4–1)	Crawford (0–3)	Gott (6)	3,120	9–11	1–1
March 17	No. 10 Kentucky		McKethan Stadium	2–6	Littrell (3–0)	Hanhold (0–2)	None	3,284	9–12	1–2
March 19	North Florida		McKethan Stadium	9–4	Simpson (1–1)	Trexler (2–2)	None	2,338	10–12	–
March 22	at No. 2 Vanderbilt		Hawkins Field; Nashville, TN	7–1	Carmichael (3–1)	Ziomek (5–1)	None	2,477	11–12	2–2
March 23	at No. 2 Vanderbilt		Hawkins Field	1–6	Beede (6–0)	Crawford (0–4)	None	2,733	11–13	2–3
March 24	at No. 2 Vanderbilt		Hawkins Field	4–5^{7}	Miller (3–0)	Harris (3–2)	None	2,484	11–14	2–4
March 26	vs. No. 4 Florida State; Rivalry		Baseball Grounds; Jacksonville, FL	1–2	Smith (3–0)	Young (0–2)	Coles (5)	9,269	11–15	–
March 29	No. 11 Ole Miss		McKethan Stadium	3–4^{11}	Greenwood (3–0)	Magliozzi (2–1)	Huber (7)	3,959	11–16	2–5
March 30	No. 11 Ole Miss		McKethan Stadium	7–0	Crawford (1–4)	Mayers (2–3)	None	3,668	12–16	3–5
March 31	No. 11 Ole Miss		McKethan Stadium	4–0	Young (1–2)	Ellis (1–2)	Magliozzi (5)	2,934	13–16	4–5

April

Date	Opponent	Rank	Stadium Site	Score	Win	Loss	Save	Attendance	Overall Record	SEC Record
April 2	UCF		McKethan Stadium	5–3	Harris (4–2)	Matulis (3–1)	Magliozzi (6)	3,225	14–16	–
April 5	at No. 17 Mississippi State		Dudy Noble Field; Starkville, MS	3–7	Pollorena (5–1)	Crawford (1–5)	Holder (9)	8,414	14–17	4–6
April 6	at No. 17 Mississippi State		Dudy Noble Field	0–2	Graveman (4–2)	Young (1–3)	None	8,564	14–18	4–7
April 7	at No. 17 Mississippi State		Dudy Noble Field	8–3	Magliozzi (3–1)	Lindgren (2–1)	None	7,660	15–18	5–7
April 9	at No. 7 Florida State; Rivalry		Dick Howser Stadium; Tallahassee, FL	4–3	Gibson (1–0)	Coles (2–1)	None	6,719	16–18	–
April 11	No. 8 South Carolina		McKethan Stadium	3–2	Crawford (2–5)	Belcher (5–3)	Magliozzi (7)	3,268	17–18	6–7
April 12	No. 8 South Carolina		McKethan Stadium	4–3	Rhodes (1–0)	Westmoreland (4–1)	Magliozzi (8)	4,515	18–18	7–7
April 13	No. 8 South Carolina		McKethan Stadium	14–5	Gibson (2–0)	Wynkoop (4–2)	None	4,374	19–18	8–7
April 16	vs. Florida Gulf Coast		Hammond Stadium; Fort Myers, FL	5–3	Poyner (1–0)	Brown (1–1)	Magliozzi (9)	4,525	20–18	–
April 19	at Missouri		Taylor Stadium; Columbia, MO	8–6	Crawford (3–5)	Zastryzny (2–7)	Magliozzi (10)	840	21–18	9–7
April 20	at Missouri		Taylor Stadium	4–3^{15}	Poyner (2–0)	Anderson (0–1)	Magliozzi (11)	2,563	22–18	10–7
April 21	at Missouri		Taylor Stadium	2–8	Walsh (1–0)	Simpson (1–2)	Miles (2)	1,018	22–19	10–8
April 23	South Florida		McKethan Stadium	12–1	Young (2–3)	Clarkson (1–5)	None	2,892	23–19	–
April 26	Tennessee		McKethan Stadium	7–2	Young (3–3)	Quillen (1–3)	None	3,864	24–19	11–8
April 27	Tennessee		McKethan Stadium	3–2^{10}	Magliozzi (4–1)	Bettencourt (2–3)	None	4,825	25–19	12–8
April 28	Tennessee		McKethan Stadium	2–4	Godley (4–5)	Poyner (2–1)	None	4,092	25–20	12–9

May

Date	Opponent	Rank	Stadium Site	Score	Win	Loss	Save	Attendance	Overall Record	SEC Record
May 2	at No. 3 LSU		Alex Box Stadium; Baton Rouge, LA	2–3	Bourgeois (3–1)	Harris (4–3)	Cotton (10)	10,217	25–21	12–10
May 3	at No. 3 LSU		Alex Box Stadium	0–5	Nola (9–0)	Poyner (2–2)	None	10,947	25–22	12–11
May 4	at No. 3 LSU		Alex Box Stadium	6–18	Eades (8–1)	Young (3–4)	None	11,310	25–23	12–12
May 6	Florida A&M		McKethan Stadium	22–1	Shafer (1–1)	Robert (2–2)	None	2,654	26–23	–
May 7	Florida Atlantic		McKethan Stadium	7–1	Poyner (3–2)	Meiers (4–3)	None	2,618	27–23	–
May 10	Auburn		McKethan Stadium	4–7	Kendrick (4–3)	Crawford (3–6)	Dedrick (7)	3,658	27–24	12–13
May 11	Auburn		McKethan Stadium	5–4	Vinson (1–0)	Carter (1–1)	None	3,183	28–24	13–13
May 12	Auburn		McKethan Stadium	1–4	Williamson (2–0)	Hanhold (0–3)	Dedrick (8)	3,149	28–25	13–14
May 16	at Georgia		Foley Field; Athens, GA	4–2	Harris (5–3)	Boling (3–7)	Magliozzi (12)	1,908	29–25	14–14
May 17	at Georgia		Foley Field	1–3	McLaughlin (5–6)	Poyner (3–3)	Cole (4)	3,016	29–26	14–15
May 18	at Georgia		Foley Field	2–9	Ripple (3–1)	Hanhold (0–4)	None	2,701	29–27	14–16

Postseason
SEC Tournament

Date	Opponent	Rank	Stadium Site	Score	Win	Loss	Save	Attendance	Overall Record	SECT Record
May 21	vs. (9) Texas A&M	(8)	Metropolitan Stadium; Hoover, AL	3–6	Mengden (8–3)	Magliozzi (4–2)	None	5,404	29–28	0–1

NCAA tournament: Bloomington Regional

Date	Opponent	Rank	Stadium Site	Score	Win	Loss	Save	Attendance	Overall Record	Regional Record
May 31	vs. (2) Austin Peay	(3)	Bart Kaufman Field; Bloomington, IN	3–4	Kemmer (6–0)	Harris (5–4)	Rogers (22)	1,092	29–29	0–1
June 1	vs. (4) Valparaiso	(3)	Bart Kaufman Field	4–5	Wormington (6–7)	Gibson (2–1)	None	1,112	29–30	0–2

Rankings from USA Today/ESPN Top 25 coaches' baseball poll. All times Eastern. Parenthesis indicate tournament seedings. Retrieved from FloridaGators.com

== Record vs. conference opponents ==
Last two do not qualify for conf. tourn. Blank are not scheduled. Blue are home games, otherwise away.

2013 SEC baseball records Source: 2013 SEC baseball game results, 2013 SEC baseball schedule
Team	W–L	ALA	ARK	AUB	FLA	UGA	KEN	LSU	MSU	MIZZ	MISS	SCAR	TENN	TAMU	VAN	Team	Div	SR	SW
ALA	14–15		1–2	2–1	.	3–0	.	1–2	0–3	2–1	0–3	.	2–1	2–0	1–2	ALA	W5	5–5	1–2
ARK	18–11	2–1		1–2	.	2–0	2–1	1–2	2–1	.	1–2	3–0	2–1	2–1	.	ARK	W2	7–3	1–0
AUB	13–17	1–2	2–1		2–1	2–1	.	0–3	1–2	1–2	2–1	.	.	2–1	0–3	AUB	W7	5–5	0–2
FLA	14–16	.	.	1–2		1–2	1–2	0–3	1–2	2–1	2–1	3–0	2–1	.	1–2	FLA	E3	4–6	1–1
UGA	7–20	0–3	0–2	1–2	2–1		1–2	.	.	1–2	.	0–3	1–0	0–3	1–2	UGA	E7	1–8	0–3
KEN	11–19	.	1–2	.	2–1	2–1		0–3	2–1	1–2	2–1	0–3	1–2	.	0–3	KEN	E4	4–6	0–3
LSU	23–7	2–1	2–1	3–0	3–0	.	3–0		2–1	3–0	2–1	1–2	.	2–1	.	LSU	W1	9–1	4–0
MSU	16–14	3–0	1–2	2–1	2–1	.	1–2	1–2		.	1–2	2–1	.	3–0	0–3	MSU	W3	5–5	2–1
MIZZ	10–20	1–2	.	2–1	1–2	2–1	2–1	0–3	.		.	1–2	1–2	0–3	0–3	MIZZ	E5	3–7	0–3
MISS	15–15	3–0	2–1	1–2	1–2	.	1–2	1–2	2–1	.		.	3–0	1–2	0–3	MISS	W4	4–6	2–1
SCAR	17–12	.	0–3	.	0–3	3–0	3–0	2–1	1–2	2–1	.		3–0	3–0	0–2	SCAR	E2	6–4	4–2
TENN	8–20	1–2	1–2	.	1–2	0–1	2–1	.	.	2–1	0–3	0–3		1–2	0–3	TENN	E6	2–7	0–3
TAMU	13–16	0–2	1–2	1–2	.	3–0	.	1–2	0–3	3–0	2–1	0–3	2–1		.	TAMU	W6	4–6	2–2
VAN	26–3	2–1	.	3–0	2–1	2–1	3–0	.	3–0	3–0	3–0	2–0	3–0	.		VAN	E1	10–0	6–0
Team	W–L	ALA	ARK	AUB	FLA	UGA	KEN	LSU	MSU	MIZZ	MISS	SCAR	TENN	TAMU	VAN	Team	Div	SR	SW

Updated for entire regular season.

== Rankings ==
Ranking movements Legend: ██ Increase in ranking ██ Decrease in ranking — = Not ranked RV = Received votes ( ) = First-place votes
	Week																			
Poll	Pre	1	2	3	4	5	6	7	8	9	10	11	12	13	14	15	16	17	18	Final
Coaches'	13 (1)	13 (1)*	—	—	—	—	RV	—	—	RV	RV	RV	—	—	—	—	—	—	—	—
Baseball America	17	17	—	—	—	—	—	—	—	—	—	21	—	—	—	—	—	—	—	—
Collegiate Baseball^	24	24	—	—	—	—	—	—	—	19	19	19	—	—	—	—	—	—	—	—
NCBWA†	15	17	29	—	—	—	—	—	—	RV	RV	RV	—	—	—	—	—	—	—	—

^ Collegiate Baseball ranked 40 teams in their preseason poll, but only ranked 30 teams weekly during the season.
† NCBWA ranks 30 teams in their preseason poll, but only ranks 25 teams weekly during the season.
* A new poll was not released for this week, so for comparison purposes, the previous week's ranking is inserted in this week's slot.

== Awards and honors ==
Harrison Bader

- SEC Freshman of the Week (4/8/13–4/15/13). Bader batted .462 (6-for-13) with four RBI over four wins, including a win over No. 7 Florida State and a three-game sweep of No. 8 South Carolina.

Jonathon Crawford

- SEC Pitcher of the Week (3/25/13–4/1/13). Crawford pitched a complete-game shutout, giving up only two hits in a 7–0 victory over No. 11 Ole Miss on March 30.

Zack Powers

- Louisville Slugger National Player of the Week and Co-SEC Player of the Week (2/15/13–2/18/13). Powers batted 3-for-6 (.500) over three games against Duke and hit two grand slams on February 17.

== Gators in the MLB draft ==
Round	Selection	Player	Position	Team
1	20	Jonathon Crawford	RHP	Detroit Tigers
7	210	Daniel Gibson	LHP	Arizona Diamondbacks
17	506	Johnny Magliozzi	RHP	New York Mets
22	676	Cody Dent	SS	Washington Nationals
37	1,126	Karsten Whitson	RHP	Washington Nationals
