= 2013 LSU Tigers baseball team =

American college baseball season

2013 LSU Tigers baseball

SEC Western Division Champion 2013 SEC baseball tournament Champion Baton Rouge Regional Champion Baton Rouge Super Regional Champion

College World Series, 0–2
- Conference: Southeastern Conference
- West

Ranking
- Coaches: No. 6
- CB: No. 7
- Record: 57-11 (23-7 SEC)
- Head coach: Paul Mainieri
- Hitting coach: Javi Sanchez
- Pitching coach: Alan Dunn
- Home stadium: Alex Box Stadium/Skip Bertman Field

2013 Southeastern Conference baseball standings
	Conf.				Overall
Team	W		L	PCT	W		L	PCT
Eastern
No. 9 Vanderbilt ^{x}‍†‍‍^{y}	26	–	3	.897	54	–	12	.818
No. 13 South Carolina ‍‍‍^{y}	17	–	12	.586	43	–	20	.683
Florida ‍‍‍^{y}	14	–	16	.467	29	–	30	.492
Kentucky ‍‍‍	11	–	19	.367	30	–	25	.545
Missouri ‍‍‍	10	–	20	.333	18	–	32	.360
Tennessee ‍‍‍	8	–	20	.286	22	–	30	.423
Georgia ‍‍‍	7	–	20	.259	21	–	32	.396
Western
No. 7 LSU ^{x}‍‍‡‍^{y}	23	–	7	.767	57	–	11	.838
No. 18 Arkansas ‍‍‍^{y}	18	–	11	.621	39	–	22	.639
No. 2 Mississippi State ‍‍‍^{y}	16	–	14	.533	51	–	20	.718
Ole Miss ‍‍‍^{y}	15	–	15	.500	38	–	24	.613
Alabama ‍‍‍^{y}	14	–	15	.483	35	–	28	.556
Texas A&M ‍‍‍^{y}	13	–	16	.448	34	–	29	.540
Auburn ‍‍‍	13	–	17	.433	33	–	23	.589
x – Division champion † – Conference champion ‡ – Tournament champion y – Invited to the NCAA tournament As of June 26, 2013; Rankings from Collegiate Baseball

The 2013 LSU Tigers baseball team represented Louisiana State University in the NCAA Division I baseball season of 2013. The Tigers played their home games in the new Alex Box Stadium, which opened in 2009. On May 17, 2013, the playing field at Alex Box Stadium was designated Skip Bertman Field, in honor of the LSU coach with the most wins in the program's history. At the end of the game against Ole Miss, the program celebrated the best regular season record in its history with 48 wins.

The team was coached by Paul Mainieri who was in his seventh season at LSU. In the 2012 season, the Tigers failed to reach the College World Series; however, the Tigers did win the regular season and post season SEC championship. Overall, the Tigers finished 47–18, 19–11 in the SEC.

== Pre-season ==
=== Key losses ===
- Kevin Gausman (RHP) - 4th overall selection in 2012 MLB draft
- Austin Nola (SS) - 4-year starter; 5th round selection in 2012 MLB Draft
- Tyler Hanover (INF) - 4-year starter; 11th round selection in 2012 MLB Draft

=== Key players returning ===
- Ryan Eades (RHP) - 5–3 with a 3.83 ERA in 2012
- Mason Katz (1B) - 13 Home Runs in 2012 (Lead SEC)
- Aaron Nola (RHP) - 7–4 with a 3.61 ERA in 2012
- Raph Rhymes (OF) - 2012 SEC POY; Lead NCAA with .431 BA

== Personnel ==
=== Roster ===
2013 LSU Tigers baseball roster
Pitchers: 10 Aaron Nola - Sophomore; 12 Hunter Devall - Freshman; 21 Joe Broussard - Junior; 24 Cody Glenn - Sophomore; 25 Joey Bourgeois - Senior; 27 Mitch Sewald - Freshman; 29 Nate Fury - Junior; 33 Kevin Berry - Senior; 36 Will LaMarche - Junior; 37 Ryan Eades - Junior; 38 Nick Rumbelow - Junior; 39 Kurt McCune - Junior; 40 Taylor Butler - Freshman; 45 Russell Reynolds - Freshman; 49 Brent Bonvillain - Senior; 55 Hunter Newman - Freshman; 58 Chris Cotton - Senior	Catchers: 11 Michael Barash - Freshman; 20 Chris Chinea - Freshman; 26 Ty Ross - Junior	Infielders: 2 Tyler Moore - Sophomore; 8 Mason Katz - Senior; 14 Christian Ibarra - Junior; 17 Jared Foster - Sophomore; 23 JaCoby Jones - Junior; 28 Casey Yocom - Senior; 30 Alex Bregman - Freshman	Outfielders: 4 Raph Rhymes - Senior; 5 Chris Sciambra - Sophomore; 6 Andrew Stevenson (baseball) - Freshman; 7 Sean McMullen - Junior; 9 Mark Laird - Freshman; 13 Alex Edward - Senior

2013 LSU Tigers Baseball Roster & Bios http://www.lsusports.net/SportSelect.dbml?&DB_OEM_ID=5200&SPID=2173&SPSID=27867

=== Coaching staff ===
2013 LSU Tigers baseball coaching staff
- Paul Mainieri - Head coach - 7 years at LSU
- Alan Dunn - Pitching coach - 2 year
- Javi Sanchez - Hitting coach - 5 years
- Will Davis - Volunteer assistant coach - 5 years
- Blake Dean - Undergraduate Assistant - 1st year
- Ross Brezovsky - Coordinator of Baseball Operations - 4 years

2013 LSU Tigers Baseball Coaches & Bios http://www.lsusports.net/SportSelect.dbml?&DB_OEM_ID=5200&SPID=2173&SPSID=28707

== Schedule/Results ==
2013 LSU Tigers baseball game log

Regular season

February
#	Date	Opponent	Site/stadium	Score	Win	Loss	Save	Attendance	Overall record	SEC record
1	February 15	Maryland Terrapins	Alex Box Stadium	1–0	Nola (1–0)	Reed (0–1)	Cotton (1)	9,746	1–0	-
2	February 16	Maryland	Alex Box Stadium	5–1	Berry (1–0)	Kirkpatrick (0–1)	-	7,104	2–0	-
3	February 17	Maryland	Alex Box Stadium	14–3	Fury (1–0)	Robinson (0–1)	-	6,462	3–0	-
4	February 19	Lamar	Alex Box Stadium	8–1	Devall (1–0)	Carver (0–1)	Cotton (2)	3,600	4–0	-
5	February 21	BYU	Alex Box Stadium	6–5	Bourgeois (1–0)	Milke (0–1)	-	9,579	5–0	-
6	February 23	BYU	Alex Box Stadium	4–9	Anderson, M (1–0)	Fury (1–1)	Lengal (1)	6,742	5–1	-
7	February 24	Southeastern Louisiana	Alex Box Stadium	13–1	Eades (1–0)	Hymel, J (0–1)	-	6,953	6–1	-
8	February 26	Louisiana–Lafayette	Alex Box Stadium	11–2	Glenn (1–0)	Smith, K (0–1)	-	3,790	7–1	-

March
#	Date	Opponent	Site/stadium	Score	Win	Loss	Save	Attendance	Overall record	SEC record
9	March 1	Brown	Alex Box Stadium	4–3	Cotton (1–0)	Wright, Tay (0–1)	-	4,265	8–1	-
10	March 2	Brown	Alex Box Stadium	7–1	Eades (2–0)	Mayo, Heath (0–1)	-	3,553	9–1	-
11	March 13	Nicholls State	Alex Box Stadium	2–0	Glenn (2–0)	Byrd, T. (2–1)	Cotton (3)	5,789	10–1	-
12	March 5	Stephen F. Austin	Alex Box Stadium	9–2	Berry (2–0)	Choate (1–1)	-	3,282	11–1	-
13	March 6	Sacred Heart	Alex Box Stadium	10–2	Rumbelow (1–0)	Scribner (0–1)		2,788	12–1	-
14	March 8	Washington	Alex Box Stadium	9–4	Nola (2–0)	Palewicz (2–3)	Cotton (4)	6,178	13–1	-
15	March 9	Washington	Alex Box Stadium	8–4	Eades (3–0)	Voth (2–2)	-	7,254	14–1	-
16	March 10	Washington	Alex Box Stadium	7–5	Glenn (3–0)	Davis (2–0)	Cotton (5)	4,823	15–1	-
17	March 13	Nicholls State	Alex Box Stadium	9–3	Bonvillain (1–0)	Langston, K (0–3)	-	4,775	16–1	-
18	March 15	Mississippi State	Dudy Noble Field	6–4 (10)	Bourgeois (2–0)	Cox (2–1)	Cotton (6)	8,068	17–1	1-0
19	March 16	Mississippi State	Dudy Noble Field	7–3	Eades (4–0)	Mitchell, E. (0–1)	-	9,341	18–1	2-0
20	March 17	Mississippi State	Dudy Noble Field	2–10	Graveman (2–1)	Glenn (3–1)	-	7,686	18–2	2-1
21	March 20	Northwestern	Alex Box Stadium	2–1 (13)	LaMarche (1–0)	Brewer, C. (0–1)	-	4,476	19–2	2-1
22	March 22	Auburn	Alex Box Stadium	9–4	Nola (3–0)	Koger, D. (0–2)	-	7,066	20–2	3-1
23	March 23	Auburn	Alex Box Stadium	5–1	Eades (5–0)	O'Neal, M. (4–2)	-	5,877	21–2	4-1
24	March 24	Auburn	Alex Box Stadium	8–2	Glenn (4–1)	Kendall, W. (0–1)	-	6,137	22–2	5-1
25	March 26	Tulane	Turchin Stadium	14–1	Reynolds (1–0)	B. Wilson (1–2)		4,725	23–2	5-1
26	March 29	Missouri	Taylor Stadium	2–0	Nola (4–0)	Zastryzny (1–5)	Cotton (7)	1,263	24–2	6–1
27	March 30	Missouri	Taylor Stadium	8–0	Eades (6–0)	Graves (0–3)	-	945	25–2	7-1
28	March 31	Missouri	Taylor Stadium	6–5	Bonvillain (2–0)	Steele (2–1)	Cotton (8)	1,107	26–2	8-1

April
#	Date	Opponent	Site/stadium	Score	Win	Loss	Save	Attendance	Overall record	SEC record
29	April 2	Alcorn State	Alex Box Stadium	7–3	Devall (2–0)	Mundo (0–2)	-	4,203	27–2	8–1
30	April 5	Kentucky	Alex Box Stadium	11–1	Nola (5–0)	Reed (2–4)	-	7,433	28–2	8-1
31	April 6	Kentucky	Alex Box Stadium	9–1	Eades (7–0)	Grundy (5–3)	-	8,569	29–2	10-1
32	April 7	Kentucky	Alex Box Stadium	11–4	Glenn (5–1)	Littrell (4–1)	-	7,223	30-2	11-1
33	April 9	Southern	Zephyr Field	11–2	McCune (1–0)	Godoy (0–3)	-	7,634	31–2	11-1
34	April 10	Southern	Alex Box Stadium	16–2	Devall (3–0)	Rochelle (1–2)	-	4,075	32–2	11-1
35	April 12	Arkansas	Baum Stadium	6–2	Nola (6–0)	Astin (2–2)	-	10,167	33–2	12–1
36	April 13	Arkansas	Baum Stadium	3–8	Stanek (4–2)	Eades (7–1)	-	10,377	33–3	12–2
37	April 14	Arkansas	Baum Stadium	5–3 (10)	Cotton (2–0)	Oliver (2–1)	-	10,180	34–3	13-2
38	April 17	Grambling	Alex Box Stadium	4–0	McCune (2–0)	Jordan (1–3)	-	3,654	35–3	13-2
39	April 19	Alabama	Sewell-Thomas Stadium	5–0	Nola (7–0)	Sullivan (3–4)	-	4,089	36–3	14-2
40	April 20	Alabama	Sewell-Thomas Stadium	11–8 (16)	McCune (3–0)	Oczypok (3–1)	-	5,948	37–3	15-2
41	April 21	Alabama	Sewell-Thomas Stadium	3–4 (10)	Haack (1–1)	Bourgeois (2–1)	-	4,178	37–4	15-3
42	April 24	Tulane	Alex Box Stadium	4–3	Berry (3–0)	LeBlanc (2–3)	Cotton (9)	4,522	38–4	15-3
43	April 26	South Carolina	Alex Box Stadium	5–2	Nola (8–0)	Belcher (6–4)	-	9,006	39–4	16-3
44	April 27	South Carolina	Alex Box Stadium	2–4	Westmoreland (5–1)	Cotton (2–1)	Webb (13)	10,246	39–5	16-4
45	April 28	South Carolina	Alex Box Stadium	0–4	Wynkoop (6–2)	McCune (3–1)	Webb (14)	6,380	39–6	16-5
46	April 30	McNeese State	Alex Box Stadium	7–3	Newman (1–0)	McGee (2–5)	-	3,104	40–6	16-5

May
#	Date	Opponent	Site/stadium	Score	Win	Loss	Save	Attendance	Overall record	SEC record
47	May 2	Florida	Alex Box Stadium	3–2	Bourgeois (3–1)	Harris (4–3)	Cotton (10)	5,033	41–6	17-5
48	May 3	Florida	Alex Box Stadium	5–0	Nola (9–0)	Poyner (2–2)	-	6,951	42–6	18-5
49	May 4	Florida	Alex Box Stadium	18–6	Eades (8–1)	Young (3–4)	-	7,733	43–6	19-5
50	May 9	Texas A&M	Olsen Field	1–2	Glenn (5–2)	Mengden (6–3)	Jester (13)	4,103	43–7	19-6
51	May 10	Texas A&M	Olsen Field	7–4	Nola (10–0)	Kent (2–3)	Cotton (11)	5,488	44–7	20-6
52	May 11	Texas A&M	Olsen Field	2–1	Cotton (3–1)	Jester (2–3)	-	5,862	45–7	21-6
53	May 14	New Orleans	Alex Box Stadium	11–2	Newman (2–0)	A. Smith (3–9)	-	5,534	46–7	21-6
54	May 16	Ole Miss	Alex Box Stadium	7–1	Glenn (6–2)	M. Mayers (4–5)	-	7,741	47–7	22-6
55	May 17	Ole Miss	Alex Box Stadium	5–4	Berry (4–0)	A. Greenwood (3–4)	Cotton (12)	10,015	48–7	23-6
56	May 18	Ole Miss	Alex Box Stadium	9–11	M. Denny (2–1)	Berry (4–1)	B. Huber (12)	8,167	48–8	23-7

Post-season

SEC tournament
#	Date	Opponent	Site/stadium	Score	Win	Loss	Save	Attendance	Overall record	SECT Record
57	May 22	Alabama	Hoover Metropolitan Stadium (Birmingham, Al.)	3–0	Glenn (7–2)	Sullivan (5–6)	Cotton (13)	6,197	49–8	1-0
58	May 23	Arkansas	Hoover Metropolitan Stadium (Birmingham, Al.)	1–4	Stanek (9–2)	Bourgeois (3–2)	Suggs (12)	-	49–9	1-1
59	May 24	Alabama	Hoover Metropolitan Stadium (Birmingham, Al.)	3–2	Fury (2–1)	Oczypok (4–2)	Cotton (14)	-	50–9	2-1
60	May 25	Arkansas	Hoover Metropolitan Stadium (Birmingham, Al.)	3–1	LaMarche (2–0)	Moore (1–4)	Cotton (15)	-	51–9	3-1
61	May 24	Vanderbilt	Hoover Metropolitan Stadium (Birmingham, Al.)	5–4 (11)	Cotton (4–1)	Miller (5–2)	-	10,590	52–9	4-1

NCAA tournament: Regionals
#	Date	Opponent	Site/stadium	Score	Win	Loss	Save	Attendance		Overall record	NCAAT Record
#	Date	Opponent	Site/stadium	Score	Win	Loss	Save	Paid	Actual	Overall record	NCAAT Record
62	May 31	Jackson St.	Alex Box Stadium (Baton Rouge, La)	11–7	McCune (4–1)	Juday, A. (7–5)	-	11,577	9,316	53–9	1-0
63	June 1	Sam Houston St.	Alex Box Stadium (Baton Rouge, La)	8–5	Nola (11–0)	Scott, A. (2–1)	Cotton (16)	12,085	10,752	54–9	2-0
64	June 2	UL-Lafayette	Alex Box Stadium (Baton Rouge, La)	5–1	Bonvillain (3–0)	Boutte, C (8–4)	-	11,838	10,191	55–9	3–0

NCAA tournament: Super Regionals
#	Date	Opponent	Site/stadium	Score	Win	Loss	Save	Attendance		Overall record	NCAAT Record
#	Date	Opponent	Site/stadium	Score	Win	Loss	Save	Paid	Actual	Overall record	NCAAT Record
65	June 7	#19 Oklahoma	Alex Box Stadium (Baton Rouge, La)	2–0	Nola (12–0)	Gray, J. (10–3)	-	12,007	11,095	56–9	4-0
66	June 8	#19 Oklahoma	Alex Box Stadium (Baton Rouge, La)	11–1	LaMarche (3–0)	Overton, D. (9–3)	-	12,153	11,401	57–9	5-0

College World Series
#	Date	Opponent	Site/stadium	Score	Win	Loss	Save	Attendance		Overall record	NCAAT Record
#	Date	Opponent	Site/stadium	Score	Win	Loss	Save	Paid	Actual	Overall record	NCAAT Record
67	June 16	#2 UCLA	TD Ameritrade Park Omaha (Omaha, Nebraska)	2–1	Plutko (9–3)	Nola (12–1)	Berg (22)	-	26,344	57–10	5-1
68	June 18	#2 North Carolina	TD Ameritrade Park Omaha (Omaha, Nebraska)	2–1	Thornton, T (12–1)	Glenn (7–3)	McCue, C (2)	-	21,380	57–11	5-2

*Rankings are based on the team's current ranking in the Baseball America poll the week LSU faced each opponent.

== Record vs. conference opponents ==
Last two do not qualify for conf. tourn. Blank are not scheduled. Blue are home games, otherwise away.

2013 SEC baseball records Source: 2013 SEC baseball game results, 2013 SEC baseball schedule
Team	W–L	ALA	ARK	AUB	FLA	UGA	KEN	LSU	MSU	MIZZ	MISS	SCAR	TENN	TAMU	VAN	Team	Div	SR	SW
ALA	14–15		1–2	2–1	.	3–0	.	1–2	0–3	2–1	0–3	.	2–1	2–0	1–2	ALA	W5	5–5	1–2
ARK	18–11	2–1		1–2	.	2–0	2–1	1–2	2–1	.	1–2	3–0	2–1	2–1	.	ARK	W2	7–3	1–0
AUB	13–17	1–2	2–1		2–1	2–1	.	0–3	1–2	1–2	2–1	.	.	2–1	0–3	AUB	W7	5–5	0–2
FLA	14–16	.	.	1–2		1–2	1–2	0–3	1–2	2–1	2–1	3–0	2–1	.	1–2	FLA	E3	4–6	1–1
UGA	7–20	0–3	0–2	1–2	2–1		1–2	.	.	1–2	.	0–3	1–0	0–3	1–2	UGA	E7	1–8	0–3
KEN	11–19	.	1–2	.	2–1	2–1		0–3	2–1	1–2	2–1	0–3	1–2	.	0–3	KEN	E4	4–6	0–3
LSU	23–7	2–1	2–1	3–0	3–0	.	3–0		2–1	3–0	2–1	1–2	.	2–1	.	LSU	W1	9–1	4–0
MSU	16–14	3–0	1–2	2–1	2–1	.	1–2	1–2		.	1–2	2–1	.	3–0	0–3	MSU	W3	5–5	2–1
MIZZ	10–20	1–2	.	2–1	1–2	2–1	2–1	0–3	.		.	1–2	1–2	0–3	0–3	MIZZ	E5	3–7	0–3
MISS	15–15	3–0	2–1	1–2	1–2	.	1–2	1–2	2–1	.		.	3–0	1–2	0–3	MISS	W4	4–6	2–1
SCAR	17–12	.	0–3	.	0–3	3–0	3–0	2–1	1–2	2–1	.		3–0	3–0	0–2	SCAR	E2	6–4	4–2
TENN	8–20	1–2	1–2	.	1–2	0–1	2–1	.	.	2–1	0–3	0–3		1–2	0–3	TENN	E6	2–7	0–3
TAMU	13–16	0–2	1–2	1–2	.	3–0	.	1–2	0–3	3–0	2–1	0–3	2–1		.	TAMU	W6	4–6	2–2
VAN	26–3	2–1	.	3–0	2–1	2–1	3–0	.	3–0	3–0	3–0	2–0	3–0	.		VAN	E1	10–0	6–0
Team	W–L	ALA	ARK	AUB	FLA	UGA	KEN	LSU	MSU	MIZZ	MISS	SCAR	TENN	TAMU	VAN	Team	Div	SR	SW

Updated for entire regular season.

== Ranking movements ==
Ranking movements Legend: ██ Increase in ranking ██ Decrease in ranking
	Week																			
Poll	Pre	1	2	3	4	5	6	7	8	9	10	11	12	13	14	15	16	17	18	Final
Coaches'	3	3*	3	2	3	2	2	2	2	2	3	3	3	2	2					
Baseball America	10	9	9	8	7	7	4	3	3	3	2	3	3	2	2		2			
Collegiate Baseball^	4	4	4	4	4	3	3	3	2	1	2	2	3	3	3	1	1			
NCBWA†	3	2															1			

^ Collegiate Baseball ranked 40 teams in their preseason poll, but only ranked 30 teams weekly during the season.
† NCBWA ranks 30 teams in their preseason poll, but only ranks 25 teams weekly during the season.
* A new poll was not released for this week, so for comparison purposes, the previous week's ranking is inserted in this week's slot.

== LSU Tigers in the 2013 Major League Baseball draft ==
The following members and future members (denoted by *) of the LSU Tigers baseball program were drafted in the 2013 MLB draft.

Player	Position	Round	Overall	MLB Team
Ryan Eades	RHP	2	43	Minnesota Twins
JaCoby Jones	CF	3	87	Pittsburgh Pirates
Mason Katz	2B	4	125	St. Louis Cardinals
Nick Rumbelow	RHP	7	224	New York Yankees
Will LaMarche	RHP	9	276	Detroit Tigers
Ty Ross	C	12	372	San Francisco Giants
Chris Cotton	LHP	14	407	Houston Astros
Raph Rhymes	OF	15	456	Detroit Tigers
Christian Ibarra	3B	32	959	Pittsburgh Pirates
