= 2013 Southeastern Conference baseball tournament =

- Teams: 12
- Format: See below
- Finals site: Hoover Metropolitan Stadium; Hoover, AL
- Champions: LSU (10th title)
- Winning coach: Paul Mainieri (4th title)
- MVP: Chris Cotton (LSU)
- Attendance: 134,496 (record)
- Television: ESPN2 (championship game)

2013 Southeastern Conference baseball standings
	Conf.				Overall
Team	W		L	PCT	W		L	PCT
Eastern
No. 9 Vanderbilt ^{x}‍†‍‍^{y}	26	–	3	.897	54	–	12	.818
No. 13 South Carolina ‍‍‍^{y}	17	–	12	.586	43	–	20	.683
Florida ‍‍‍^{y}	14	–	16	.467	29	–	30	.492
Kentucky ‍‍‍	11	–	19	.367	30	–	25	.545
Missouri ‍‍‍	10	–	20	.333	18	–	32	.360
Tennessee ‍‍‍	8	–	20	.286	22	–	30	.423
Georgia ‍‍‍	7	–	20	.259	21	–	32	.396
Western
No. 7 LSU ^{x}‍‍‡‍^{y}	23	–	7	.767	57	–	11	.838
No. 18 Arkansas ‍‍‍^{y}	18	–	11	.621	39	–	22	.639
No. 2 Mississippi State ‍‍‍^{y}	16	–	14	.533	51	–	20	.718
Ole Miss ‍‍‍^{y}	15	–	15	.500	38	–	24	.613
Alabama ‍‍‍^{y}	14	–	15	.483	35	–	28	.556
Texas A&M ‍‍‍^{y}	13	–	16	.448	34	–	29	.540
Auburn ‍‍‍	13	–	17	.433	33	–	23	.589
x – Division champion † – Conference champion ‡ – Tournament champion y – Invited to the NCAA tournament As of June 26, 2013; Rankings from Collegiate Baseball

The 2013 Southeastern Conference baseball tournament was held from May 21 through 26 at Hoover Metropolitan Stadium in Hoover, Alabama. The annual tournament determined the tournament champion of the Division I Southeastern Conference in college baseball. The tournament champion, LSU, earned the conference's automatic bid to the 2013 NCAA Division I baseball tournament.

The tournament has been held every year since 1977. Entering the 2013 event, LSU had claimed nine championships, the most of any school. Original members Georgia and Kentucky along with 1993 addition Arkansas have never won the tournament. This was the sixteenth consecutive year and eighteenth overall that the event has been held at Hoover Metropolitan Stadium, formerly known as Regions Park.

In 2013, the tournament set a new all-sessions attendance record of 134,496. The average per session was 8,115.

== Seeding and format ==
The regular season division winners claimed the top two seeds and the next ten teams by conference winning percentage, regardless of division, claimed the remaining berths in the tournament.

The bottom eight teams played a single-elimination opening round, followed by a two-bracket double-elimination format until the semifinals, when the format reverted to single elimination through the championship game.

Team	W	L	Pct	GB #1	Seed
Eastern Division
Vanderbilt	26	3	.897	-	1
South Carolina	17	12	.586	9	4
Florida	14	16	.467	12.5	8
Kentucky	11	19	.367	15.5	11
Missouri	10	20	.333	16.5	12
Tennessee	9	19	.321	16.5	-
Georgia	7	20	.259	18	-

Team	W	L	Pct	GB #1	Seed
Western Division
LSU	23	7	.767	3.5	2
Arkansas	18	11	.621	8	3
Mississippi State	16	14	.533	10.5	5
Ole Miss	15	15	.500	11.5	6
Alabama	14	15	.483	12	7
Texas A&M	13	16	.448	13	9
Auburn	13	17	.433	13.5	10

== Bracket ==
First round
6	Ole Miss	4
11	Kentucky	1
7	Alabama	6
10	Auburn	3
8	Florida	3
9	Texas A&M	6
5	Mississippi State	2*
12	Missouri	1

Second round
3	Arkansas	2*
6	Ole Miss	1
2	LSU	3
7	Alabama	0
6	Ole Miss	5*
7	Alabama	7
1	Vanderbilt	0
9	Texas A&M	5
4	South Carolina	3
5	Mississippi State	5
1	Vanderbilt	4*
4	South Carolina	3

Third round
3	Arkansas	4
2	LSU	1
2	LSU	3
7	Alabama	2
9	Texas A&M	4
5	Mississippi State	6
9	Texas A&M	0
1	Vanderbilt	3

Semifinals
3	Arkansas	1
2	LSU	3
5	Mississippi State	8
1	Vanderbilt	16

Finals
2	LSU	5*
1	Vanderbilt	4

- * - Indicates game required extra innings.

== Notes ==
The Mississippi State vs Missouri first-round game lasted 17 innings. This tied the record for the longest game in SEC Tournament history, which was originally set by Arkansas and Auburn in 1994.

== All-Tournament Team ==
The following players were named to the All-Tournament Team.

Pos.	Player	School
P	Tyler Beede	Vanderbilt
P	Daniel Mengden	Texas A&M
P	Ryne Stanek	Arkansas
P	Chris Cotton	LSU
C	Stuart Turner	Ole Miss
1B	Conrad Gregor	Vanderbilt
2B	Tony Kemp	Vanderbilt
3B	Christian Ibarra	LSU
SS	Adam Frazier	Mississippi State
OF	Connor Harrell	Vanderbilt
OF	Hunter Renfroe	Mississippi State
OF	Tyler Spoon	Arkansas
OF	Jared Foster	LSU
OF	Matt Vinson	Arkansas
DH	Sean McMullen	LSU
DH	Zander Wiel	Vanderbilt

=== Most Valuable Player ===
Chris Cotton was named Tournament Most Valuable Player. Cotton was a pitcher for LSU, serving as closer. In the championship game, he pitched the final 2.2 innings and did not allow any of the eight batters he faced to reach base.
