= 2013 Alabama Crimson Tide baseball team =

American college baseball season

2013 Alabama Crimson Tide baseball

Tallahassee Regional, 1–2
- Conference: Southeastern Conference
- West
- Record: 35–27 (14–15 SEC)
- Head coach: Mitch Gaspard (4th season)
- Hitting coach: Andy Phillips
- Pitching coach: Dax Norris
- Home stadium: Sewell-Thomas Stadium

2013 Southeastern Conference baseball standings
	Conf.				Overall
Team	W		L	PCT	W		L	PCT
Eastern
No. 9 Vanderbilt ^{x}‍†‍‍^{y}	26	–	3	.897	54	–	12	.818
No. 13 South Carolina ‍‍‍^{y}	17	–	12	.586	43	–	20	.683
Florida ‍‍‍^{y}	14	–	16	.467	29	–	30	.492
Kentucky ‍‍‍	11	–	19	.367	30	–	25	.545
Missouri ‍‍‍	10	–	20	.333	18	–	32	.360
Tennessee ‍‍‍	8	–	20	.286	22	–	30	.423
Georgia ‍‍‍	7	–	20	.259	21	–	32	.396
Western
No. 7 LSU ^{x}‍‍‡‍^{y}	23	–	7	.767	57	–	11	.838
No. 18 Arkansas ‍‍‍^{y}	18	–	11	.621	39	–	22	.639
No. 2 Mississippi State ‍‍‍^{y}	16	–	14	.533	51	–	20	.718
Ole Miss ‍‍‍^{y}	15	–	15	.500	38	–	24	.613
Alabama ‍‍‍^{y}	14	–	15	.483	35	–	28	.556
Texas A&M ‍‍‍^{y}	13	–	16	.448	34	–	29	.540
Auburn ‍‍‍	13	–	17	.433	33	–	23	.589
x – Division champion † – Conference champion ‡ – Tournament champion y – Invited to the NCAA tournament As of June 26, 2013; Rankings from Collegiate Baseball

The 2013 Alabama Crimson Tide baseball team represented the University of Alabama in the 2013 NCAA Division I baseball season. The Crimson Tide played their home games in Sewell-Thomas Stadium.

== Personnel ==
=== Returning starters ===
Player	Class	Position
Austen Smith	Junior	1B
Kenny Roberts	Senior	2B
Brett Booth	Senior	3B
Ben Moore	Sophomore	RF
Taylor Guilbeau	Sophomore	SP
Tucker Hawely	Senior	SP
Justin Kamplain	Sophomore	SP
Charley Sullivan	Senior	SP

=== Roster ===
2013 Alabama Crimson Tide roster
Pitchers: 11 Trey Pilkington - Senior; 17 Jay Shaw - Sophomore; 20 Taylor Guilbeau - Sophomore; 23 Ray Castillo - Freshman; 26 Justin Kamplain - Sophomore; 27 Taylor Wolfe - Junior; 28 Jake Hubbard - Sophomore; 29 Charley Sullivan - Senior; 31 Jonathan Hess - Freshman; 32 Spencer Turnbull - Sophomore; 33 Mitch Greer - Freshman; 36 Keaton Haack - Freshman; 39 Clayton Parker - Freshman; 35 Jon Keller - Sophomore; 44 Tucker Hawley - Junior; 50 Ricky Doverspike - Senior	Catchers: 10 Wade Wass - Junior; 37 Taylor Poe - Freshman; Infielders: 1 Mikey White - Freshman; 3 Kenny Roberts - Senior; 5 Brett Booth - Senior; 15 Cameron Carlisle Senior; 18 Austen Smith - Junior; 19 Daniel Cucjen - Freshman; 40 Davis Blair - Junior; 42 Allen Dye - Junior; 49 Steven Cole - Junior	Outfielders: 2 Andrew Miller - Senior; 7 Ben Moore - Sophomore; 14 Mathew Goodson - Freshman; 22 Georgie Salem - Freshman; 25 Ryan Blanchard - (redshirt) Freshman; 34 Brink Ambler - Freshman; 45 Riley Colburn - (redshirt) Freshman; Utility: 6 Kyle Overstreet - Freshman; 12 Chance Vincent - Freshman; 16 Cary Baxter - Sophomore; 21 Colton Freeman - Freshman

2013 Alabama Crimson Tide Baseball Roster

=== Coaching staff ===
2013 Alabama Crimson Tide baseball coaching staff
- 8 Mitch Gaspard – Head Coach - 13 years at Alabama (4th as Head Coach)
- 9 Andy Phillips – Hitting Coach - 3rd year
- 4 Dax Norris – Pitching Coach, Recruiting Coordinator - 7th year
- 43 Bobby Barbier – Volunteer Coach - 4th year
- – Ken Brown – Director of Operations - 2nd year

== Schedule and results ==
2013 Alabama Crimson Tide baseball game log
Regular season
February (7–1)

Date	Opponent	Site/stadium	Score	Win	Loss	Save	Attendance	Overall record	SEC record
February 15	VMI	Sewell-Thomas Stadium	8–3	R. Castillo (1–0)	R. Ellis (0–1)	None	3,269	1–0	–
February 16	VMI	Sewell-Thomas Stadium	10–5	J. Keller (1–0)	C. Henkel (0–1)	J. Hubbard (1)	3,059	2–0	–
February 17	VMI	Sewell-Thomas Stadium	7–4	T. Hawley (1–0)	C. Bach (0–1)	J. Kamplain (1)	3,046	3–0	–
February 19	#21 Southern Miss	Sewell-Thomas Stadium	10–8	T. Guilbeau (1–0)	J. Winston (0–1)	None	3,124	4–0	–
February 22	Florida Atlantic	FAU Baseball Stadium	5–2	T. Hawley (2–0)	A. Archer (0–1)	J. Hubbard (2)	559	5–0	–
February 23	Florida Atlantic	FAU Baseball Stadium	4–2	J. Keller (2–0)	J. Meiers (1–1)	R. Castillo (1)	498	6–0	–
February 24	Florida Atlantic	FAU Baseball Stadium	0–3	J. Strawn (1–0)	S. Turnbull (0–1)	H. Adams (1)	360	6–1	–
February 26	Samford	Sewell-Thomas Stadium	5–4	M. Greer (1–0)	A. Garcia (0–2)	J. Kamplain (2)	2,799	7–1	–

March (11–10)

Date	Opponent	Site/stadium	Score	Win	Loss	Save	Attendance	Overall record	SEC record
March 1	Tulane	Sewell-Thomas Stadium	0-4	T. Rizzotti (2–1)	C. Sullivan (0–1)	None	2,925	7–2	–
March 2	Tulane	Sewell-Thomas Stadium	2–6	A. Byo (1–1)	J. Keller (2–1)	A. Garner (3)	2,800	7–3	–
March 3	Tulane	Sewell-Thomas Stadium	12–6	R. Castillo (2–0)	B. Wilson (1–1)	None	2,864	8–3	–
March 5†	Auburn	Riverwalk Stadium	3–6	C. Kendrick (1–0)	T. Hawley (2–1)	None	6,911	8–4	–
March 8	#5 Louisville	Jim Patterson Stadium	3–4^{14}	K. McGrath (1–0)	J. Shaw (0–1)	None	1,659	8–5	–
March 9	#5 Louisville	Jim Patterson Stadium	0–6	J. Thompson (4–0)	J. Keller (2–2)	None	3,022	8–6	–
March 10	#5 Louisville	Jim Patterson Stadium	7–8^{10}	K. McGrath (2–0)	M. Greer (1–1)	None	3,240	8–7	–
March 12	Memphis	Sewell-Thomas Stadium	0–6	A. Gunn (1–1)	T. Guilbeau (1–1)	None	2,982	8–8	–
March 13	Memphis	Sewell-Thomas Stadium	4–2	T. Hawley (3–1)	M. Wills (0–1)	J. Hubbard (3)	2,917	9–8	–
March 15	Tennessee	Sewell-Thomas Stadium	12–1	C. Sullivan (1–1)	Z. Godley (1–2)	None	3,497	10–8	1–0
March 16	Tennessee	Sewell-Thomas Stadium	6–7	T. Bettencourt (2–1)	K. Haack (0–1)	D. Owenby (1)	3,668	10–9	1–1
March 17	Tennessee	Sewell-Thomas Stadium	15–1	S. Turnbull (1–1)	A. Cox (1–2)	None	3,376	11–9	2–1
March 19	Samford	Joe Lee Griffin Field	15–7	T. Hawley (4–1)	P. McGavin (0–3)	None	1,725	12–9	–
March 20	Jacksonville State	Sewell-Thomas Stadium	6–5	J. Hubbard (1–0)	A. Polk (2–4)	R. Castillo (2)	2,962	13–9	–
March 22	Georgia	Foley Field	6–3	C. Sullivan (2–1)	S. McLaughlin (3–2)	R. Castillo (3)	1,808	14–9	3–1
March 23	Georgia	Foley Field	6–3	J. Keller (3–2)	P. Boing (1–3)	K. Haack (1)	2,217	15–9	4–1
March 24	Georgia	Foley Field	3–0	S. Turnbull (2–1)	B. Benzor (1–1)	R. Castillo (4)	1,651	16–9	5–1
March 26	UAB	Hoover Met	0–1	S. Kelley (1–0)	T. Hawley (4–2)	J. German (1)	854	16–10	–
March 28	Auburn	Plainsman Park	6–2	C. Sullivan (3–1)	C. Kendrick (2–1)	R. Castillo (5)	4,043	17–10	6–1
March 29	Auburn	Plainsman Park	3–6	M. O'Neal (5–2)	J. Keller (3–3)	T. Dedrick (2)	3,635	17–11	6–2
March 30	Auburn	Plainsman Park	2–0	S. Turnbull (3–1)	W. Kendall (0–2)	None	3,911	18–11	7–2

April (9-7)

Date	Opponent	Site/stadium	Score	Win	Loss	Save	Attendance	Overall record	SEC record
April 2	SE Louisiana	Sewell-Thomas Stadium	9–1	M. Oczypok (1–0)	K. Cedotal (4-4)	None	2,958	19–11	–
April 4	#14 Arkansas	Sewell-Thomas Stadium	1-3	J. Beeks (4–1)	C. Sullivan (3–2)	C. Suggs (4)	2,990	19–12	7–3
April 5	#14 Arkansas	Sewell-Thomas Stadium	0–6	R. Stanek (3–2)	J. Keller (3–4)	None	3,787	19–13	7–4
April 6	#14 Arkansas	Sewell-Thomas Stadium	5–0	S. Turnbull (4–1)	R. Fant (2–1)	None	3,470	20–13	8–4
April 9	Alcorn State	Sewell-Thomas Stadium	3–2	T. Guilbeau (2–1)	M. Sanchez (0–3)	R. Castillo (6)	2,739	21–13	–
April 10	Alcorn State	Sewell-Thomas Stadium	7–3	M. Oczypok (2–0)	R. Fuentes (0-2)	None	2,774	22–13	–
April 12	#23 Ole Miss	Swayze Field	0-6	B. Wahl (6–0)	C. Sullivan (3–3)	A. Greenwood (2)	9,894	22–14	8–5
April 13	#23 Ole Miss	Swayze Field	2–5	T. Bailey (2–1)	J. Keller (3–5)	B. Huber (8)	11,729	22–15	8–6
April 14	#23 Ole Miss	Swayze Field	3–4^{11}	B. Huber (3–1)	R. Castillo (2–1)	None	7,310	22–16	8–7
April 16	UAB	Sewell-Thomas Stadium	7–4	M. Oczypok (3–0)	A. Luna (0-3)	J. Shaw (1)	3,013	23–16	–
April 19	#3 LSU	Sewell-Thomas Stadium	0-5	A. Nola (7–0)	C. Sullivan (3–4)	None	4,089	23–17	8–8
April 20	#3 LSU	Sewell-Thomas Stadium	8–11^{16}	K. McCune (3-0)	M. Oczypok (3–1)	None	5,948	23–18	8–9
April 21	#3 LSU	Sewell-Thomas Stadium	4–3^{10}	K. Haack (1–1)	J. Bourgeois (2-1)	None	4,178	24–18	9–9
April 24	Southern Miss	Pete Taylor Park	7–4	T. Guilbeau (3–1)	M. McMahon (0–1)	T. Hawley (1)	3,429	25–18	–
April 26	Texas A&M	Sewell-Thomas Stadium	3–2	C. Sullivan (4–4)	D. Mengden (4–2)	R. Castillo (7)	3,859	26–18	10–9
April 27	Texas A&M	Sewell-Thomas Stadium	3–2	J. Kamplain (1–0)	P. Ray (0–1)	R. Castillo (8)	3,207	27–18	11–9
April 28	Texas A&M	Sewell-Thomas Stadium	Cancelled						

May (5-6)

Date	Opponent	Site/stadium	Score	Win	Loss	Save	Attendance	Overall record	SEC record
May 4	#22 Mississippi State	Dudy Noble Field	6–10	R. Mitchell (9–0)	S. Turnbull (4–2)	J. Holder (13)	–	27–19	11–10
May 4	#22 Mississippi State	Dudy Noble Field	4–5^{10}	C. Girdo (5–1)	R. Castillo (2–2)	None	7,382	27–20	11–11
May 5	#22 Mississippi State	Dudy Noble Field	6-7^{11}	J. Holder (2–0)	C. Sullivan (3–4)	None	6,272	27–21	11–12
May 7	MS Valley State	Sewell-Thomas Stadium	8–3	M. Oczypok (4–1)	D. Lostra (3-8)	T. Wolfe (1)	2,621	28–21	–
May 8	Troy	Sewell-Thomas Stadium	11–2	T. Guilbeau (4–1)	T. Austin (2–1)	None	3,009	29–21	–
May 10	Missouri	Sewell-Thomas Stadium	9–7	C. Sullivan (5–4)	E. Anderson (0–3)	R. Castillo (9)	2,976	30–21	12–12
May 11	Missouri	Sewell-Thomas Stadium	3–7	K. Steelle (5–3)	S. Turnbull (4–3)	None	3,018	30–22	12–13
May 12	Missouri	Sewell-Thomas Stadium	7–6	M. Greer (2–1)	J. Walsh (1–1)	None	3,213	31–22	13–13
May 16	#1 Vanderbilt	Hawkins Field	6–7	W. Buehler (4–1)	C. Sullivan (5–5)	B. Miller (14)	3,076	31–23	13–14
May 17	#1 Vanderbilt	Hawkins Field	5–4^{10}	J. Shaw (1–1)	B. Miller(5–1)	R. Castillo (10)	3,357	32–23	14–14
May 18	#1 Vanderbilt	Hawkins Field	14–10	S. Rice (4–0)	T. Guilbeau (4–2)	T. Pecoraro (1)	3,357	32–24	14–15

Postseason
SEC Tournament (2-2)

Date	Opponent	Site/stadium	Score	Win	Loss	Save	Attendance	Overall record	SECT record
May 21	Auburn	Hoover Met	6–3	J. Shaw (2–1)	R. Carter (1–2)	R. Castillo (11)	7,241	33–24	1–0
May 22	#2 LSU	Hoover Met	0–3	C. Glen (7–2)	C. Sullivan (5–6)	C. Cotton (13)	6,197	33–25	1–1
May 23	Ole Miss	Hoover Met	7–5^{10}	T. Hawley (5–2)	T. Bailey (4–2)	None	5,705	34–25	2–1
May 24	#2 LSU	Hoover Met	2–3	N. Fury (2-1)	M. Oczypok (4–2)	C. Cotton (14)	11,207	34–26	2–2

NCAA Regional (1-2)

Date	Opponent	Site/stadium	Score	Win	Loss	Save	Attendance	Overall record	SECT record
May 31	Troy	Dick Howser Stadium	2–5	S. McCain (9–1)	C. Sullivan (5–7)	T. Hicks (2)	3,206	34–27	0–1
June 1	Savannah State	Dick Howser Stadium	3–2	M. Oczypok (5–2)	J. May (5–4)	R. Castillo (12)	2,932	35–27	1–1
May 31	Troy	Dick Howser Stadium	8–9	J. McGowan (2–0)	R. Castillo (2–3)	None	3,046	35–28	1–2

† Indicates the game does not count toward the 2013 Southeastern Conference standings.
*Rankings are based on the team's current ranking in the Baseball America poll the week Alabama faced each opponent.

== Record vs. conference opponents ==
Last two do not qualify for conf. tourn. Blank are not scheduled. Blue are home games, otherwise away.

2013 SEC baseball records Source: 2013 SEC baseball game results, 2013 SEC baseball schedule
Team	W–L	ALA	ARK	AUB	FLA	UGA	KEN	LSU	MSU	MIZZ	MISS	SCAR	TENN	TAMU	VAN	Team	Div	SR	SW
ALA	14–15		1–2	2–1	.	3–0	.	1–2	0–3	2–1	0–3	.	2–1	2–0	1–2	ALA	W5	5–5	1–2
ARK	18–11	2–1		1–2	.	2–0	2–1	1–2	2–1	.	1–2	3–0	2–1	2–1	.	ARK	W2	7–3	1–0
AUB	13–17	1–2	2–1		2–1	2–1	.	0–3	1–2	1–2	2–1	.	.	2–1	0–3	AUB	W7	5–5	0–2
FLA	14–16	.	.	1–2		1–2	1–2	0–3	1–2	2–1	2–1	3–0	2–1	.	1–2	FLA	E3	4–6	1–1
UGA	7–20	0–3	0–2	1–2	2–1		1–2	.	.	1–2	.	0–3	1–0	0–3	1–2	UGA	E7	1–8	0–3
KEN	11–19	.	1–2	.	2–1	2–1		0–3	2–1	1–2	2–1	0–3	1–2	.	0–3	KEN	E4	4–6	0–3
LSU	23–7	2–1	2–1	3–0	3–0	.	3–0		2–1	3–0	2–1	1–2	.	2–1	.	LSU	W1	9–1	4–0
MSU	16–14	3–0	1–2	2–1	2–1	.	1–2	1–2		.	1–2	2–1	.	3–0	0–3	MSU	W3	5–5	2–1
MIZZ	10–20	1–2	.	2–1	1–2	2–1	2–1	0–3	.		.	1–2	1–2	0–3	0–3	MIZZ	E5	3–7	0–3
MISS	15–15	3–0	2–1	1–2	1–2	.	1–2	1–2	2–1	.		.	3–0	1–2	0–3	MISS	W4	4–6	2–1
SCAR	17–12	.	0–3	.	0–3	3–0	3–0	2–1	1–2	2–1	.		3–0	3–0	0–2	SCAR	E2	6–4	4–2
TENN	8–20	1–2	1–2	.	1–2	0–1	2–1	.	.	2–1	0–3	0–3		1–2	0–3	TENN	E6	2–7	0–3
TAMU	13–16	0–2	1–2	1–2	.	3–0	.	1–2	0–3	3–0	2–1	0–3	2–1		.	TAMU	W6	4–6	2–2
VAN	26–3	2–1	.	3–0	2–1	2–1	3–0	.	3–0	3–0	3–0	2–0	3–0	.		VAN	E1	10–0	6–0
Team	W–L	ALA	ARK	AUB	FLA	UGA	KEN	LSU	MSU	MIZZ	MISS	SCAR	TENN	TAMU	VAN	Team	Div	SR	SW

Updated for entire regular season.

== Rankings ==
Ranking movements Legend: ██ Increase in ranking ██ Decrease in ranking — = Not ranked RV = Received votes
	Week																			
Poll	Pre	1	2	3	4	5	6	7	8	9	10	11	12	13	14	15	16	17	18	Final
Coaches'	—	—*	RV	RV	—	—	—	RV	—	—	—	—	—	—	—	—	—	—	—	—
Baseball America	—	—	—	—	—	—	—	—	—	—	—	—	—	—	—	—	—	—	—	—
Collegiate Baseball^	—	—	—	—	—	—	—	22	—	—	—	—	—	—	—	—	—	—	—	—
NCBWA†	—	—	RV	RV	—	—	—	RV	—	—	—	—	—	—	—	—	—	—	—	—

^ Collegiate Baseball ranked 40 teams in their preseason poll, but only ranked 30 teams weekly during the season.
† NCBWA ranks 30 teams in their preseason poll, but only ranks 25 teams weekly during the season.
* A new poll was not released for this week, so for comparison purposes, the previous week's ranking is inserted in this week's slot.

== Awards and honors ==
Ray Castillo

All–SEC Freshman Team; RP

Kyle Overstreet

All–SEC Freshman Team; 2B

Georgie Salem

SEC Freshman of the Week; March 18

Chance Vincent

SEC Freshman of the Week; May 20

Mikey White

All–SEC Second Team; SS
SEC Freshman of the Week; February 18

== Alabama Crimson Tide in the 2013 MLB draft ==
The following members of the Alabama Crimson Tide baseball program were drafted in the 2013 MLB draft.

Player	Position	Round	Overall	Date Signed	MLB team
Nick Eicholtz†	RHP	29th	872nd	Unsigned	Milwaukee Brewers
Charley Sullivan	SP	29th	876th	–	Detroit Tigers
Brett Booth	C	34th	1,007th	6/11/13	Houston Astros
Geoffrey Bramblett†	RHP	37th	1,123rd	Unsigned	Atlanta Braves

† Indicates the player 2013-14 baseball signee

== See also ==
- Alabama Crimson Tide baseball
- 2013 NCAA Division I baseball season
- 2013 Alabama Crimson Tide softball season
