= 2013 New Orleans Privateers baseball team =

American college baseball season

2013 New Orleans Privateers baseball
- Conference: Independent
- Record: 7–44
- Head coach: Bruce Peddie
- Hitting coach: James Jurries
- Pitching coach: Justin Garcia
- Home stadium: Wesley Barrow Stadium (Temporary)

The 2013 New Orleans Privateers baseball team represented University of New Orleans in the 2013 NCAA Division I baseball season. Because of renovations to Maestri Field, the Privateers played their home games at Wesley Barrow Stadium.

The team was led by fourth year head coach, Bruce Peddie who came off of a 17–27 record for the 2012 season. For the 2013 season, the Privateers competed as a Division I Independent after a 1-year stint as a Division II Independent.

== Personnel ==
=== Roster ===
2013 New Orleans Privateers baseball roster
| Pitchers: 7 Daniel Martinez – Freshman; 9 Kyle Blancaneaux – Senior; 10 Stone Speer – Senior; 11 Jordan Nelson – Senior; 13 Jordan Fontenelle – Freshman; 15 Blake Prest – Freshman; 17 Nicholas Schiro – Freshman; 18 Alex Smith – Sophomore; 20 Joshua Fountain – Redshirt Sophomore; 22 Darron Mckigney – Junior; 23 Christian Cale – Junior; 28 Raymond Winter – Junior; 29 Garrett Manning – Senior; 30 Cameron Glendinning – Senior; 33 Andrew Shirley – Freshman | Catchers: 6 Shayne LeRouge – Sophomore; 24 Tyler Hughes – Junior; 26 Cameron Keener – Junior; 38 Brian Dixon – Junior | Infielders: 3 Trevor McCarthy – Junior; 4 Zach Liberto – Sophomore; 12 Zacary Hawkins^ – Junior; 19 Zach Pohto – Senior; 34 Seth Laigast – Sophomore; 42 James Boddicker – Junior; 44 Jonathan Coco – Sophomore | Outfielders: 1 Tim Broussard^ – Freshman; 8 Reese Kanter – Junior; 25 Stephen Potter^ – Freshman; 27 Morgan Barger – Junior; 31 Dan Perkins^ – Senior; 32 Andre Damiens^ – Sophomore; 36 Chaz Boyer – Junior |

^Denotes players who also share pitching duties.
2013 UNO Privateers Roster

=== Coaching staff ===
2013 New Orleans Privateers baseball coaching staff
- Bruce Peddie – Head coach – 4th year at UNO
- James Jurries – Hitting coach – 1st year
- Justin Garcia – Pitching coach – 3rd year
- Kal Bonura – Student assistant – 2nd year
- Jason Veillion – Field coordinator

2013 UNO Privateers Coaching Staff

== Schedule ==
2013 New Orleans Privateers baseball game log
Regular season
February

| Date | Opponent | Rank | Site/stadium | Score | Win | Loss | Save | Attendance | Overall record |
|---|---|---|---|---|---|---|---|---|---|
| February 15 | Southeast Missouri State | – | Wesley Barrow Stadium | 4–7 | A. Winkelman (1–0) | G. Manning (0–1) | B. Hurst | 410 | 0–1 |
| February 16 | Southeast Missouri State | – | Wesley Barrow Stadium | 1–6 | Z. Smith (1–0) | A. Smith (0–1) | None | 297 | 0–2 |
| February 17 | Southeast Missouri State | – | Wesley Barrow Stadium | 2–11 | W. Spitzfaden (1–0) | K. Blancaneaux (0–1) | None | 272 | 0–3 |
| February 19 | at #1 Arkansas | – | Baum Stadium | 0–14 | C. Poche (1–0) | D. Martinez (0–1) | None | N/A | 0–4 |
| February 19 | at #1 Arkansas | – | Baum Stadium | 0–3 | L. Simpson (1–0) | B. Prest (0–1) | J. Beeks | 1,943 | 0–5 |
| February 22 | at South Alabama | – | Eddie Stanky Field | 6–29 | J. Traylor (1–0) | S. Speer (0–1) | None | 1,246 | 0–6 |
| February 23 | at South Alabama | – | Eddie Stanky Field | Postponed | | | | | |
| February 24 | at South Alabama | – | Eddie Stanky Field | 1–4 | J. Noble (2–0) | A. Smith (0–2) | B. Boyle | N/A | 0–7 |
| February 24 | at South Alabama | – | Eddie Stanky Field | 2–5 | D. Stamey (1–0) | B. Prest (0–2) | K. Bartsch | 1,691 | 0–8 |
| February 27 | at Tulane | – | Turchin Stadium | 3–5 | B. Wilson (1–0) | S. Speer (0–2) | A. Garner | N/A | 0–9 |

March

| Date | Opponent | Rank | Site/stadium | Score | Win | Loss | Save | Attendance | Overall record |
|---|---|---|---|---|---|---|---|---|---|
| March 1 | at Central Arkansas | – | Bear Stadium | 1–11 | C. McClanahan (2–0) | B. Prest (0–3) | None | 114 | 0–10 |
| March 2 | Wichita State | – | Bear Stadium | 1–5 | T. Mateychick (1–1) | A. Smith (0–3) | None | 97 | 0–11 |
| March 3 | at Central Arkansas | – | Bear Stadium | 3–4 | E. McKinzie (2–0) | A. Shirley (0–1) | None | 109 | 0–12 |
| March 8 | at McNeese | – | Cowboy Diamond | 2–5 | B. Kingsley (2–2) | A. Smith (0–4) | T. McGee | 212 | 0–13 |
| March 9 | at McNeese | – | Cowboy Diamond | 8–10 | B. Ware (3–1) | S. Speer (0–3) | S. Peterson (4) | N/A | 0–14 |
| March 9 | at McNeese | – | Cowboy Diamond | 8–7 | R. Winter (1–0) | M. Desabrais (0–1) | None | 351 | 1–14 |
| March 12 | Alcorn State | – | Wesley Barrow Stadium | 6–5 | S. Speer (1–3) | G. Harrison (1–1) | None | 378 | 2–14 |
| March 13 | Alcorn State | – | Wesley Barrow Stadium | 7–5 | R. Winter (2–0) | J. Lemond (0–2) | None | 341 | 3–14 |
| March 15 | Baylor | – | Cougar Field | 0–10 | D. Newman (3–0) | S. Speer (1–4) | None | 304 | 3–15 |
| March 15 | at Houston | – | Cougar Field | 3–13 | D. Poncedeleon (2–2) | B. Prest (0–4) | None | 1,011 | 3–16 |
| March 16 | Baylor | – | Cougar Field | 3–8 | B. McCormack (1–0) | D. Martinez (0–2) | None | 579 | 3–17 |
| March 17 | at Houston | – | Cougar Field | 3–8 | T. Ford (2–0) | A. Smith (0–5) | None | 1,064 | 3–18 |
| March 19 | at Tulane | – | Turchin Stadium | 5–4 | B. Prest (1–4) | E. Gibbs (0–1) | S. Speer (1) | 1,897 | 4–18 |
| March 23 | at Grambling | – | Wilbert Ellis Field | 4–5 | TJ Murphy (2–1) | R. Winter (2–1) | Z. Moreau | 52 | 4–19 |
| March 24 | at Grambling | – | Wilbert Ellis Field | 5–9 | A. Manrrique | S. Speer (1–5) | Z. Moreau | 122 | 4–20 |
| March 24 | at Grambling | – | Wilbert Ellis Field | 5–17 | R. Bautista | B. Prest (1–5) | None | 121 | 4–21 |
| March 26 | at Nicholls State | – | Ray E. Didier Field | 4–14 | Z. Thiac (2–1) | S. Potter (0–1) | None | 420 | 4–22 |
| March 28 | at West Virginia | – | Hawley Field | 2–11 | B. Dykxhoorn (1–0) | S. Laigast (0–1) | None | 191 | 4–23 |
| March 29 | at West Virginia | – | Hawley Field | 2–12 | H. Musgrave (4–1) | A. Smith (0–6) | None | 326 | 4–24 |
| March 30 | at West Virginia | – | Hawley Field | 1–5 | C. Walter (2–2) | S. Speer (1–6) | None | N/A | 4–25 |
| March 30 | at West Virginia | – | Hawley Field | 3–4 | R. Hostranger (2–0) | G. Manning (0–2) | P. Paul | 503 | 4–26 |

April

| Date | Opponent | Rank | Site/stadium | Score | Win | Loss | Save | Attendance | Overall record |
|---|---|---|---|---|---|---|---|---|---|
| April 1 | Jackson State | – | Wesley Barrow Stadium | 1–0 | A. Smith (1–6) | A. Knowles (1–2) | S. Speer (2) | 296 | 5–26 |
| April 9 | Southern Miss | – | Wesley Barrow Stadium | 1–2 | N. Johnson (1–0) | R. Winter (2–2) | None | 418 | 5–27 |
| April 10 | at Southern Miss | – | Pete Taylor Park | 5–8 | J. Winston (1–1) | A. Shirley (0–2) | J. McMahon (1) | 2,907 | 5–28 |
| April 12 | Georgia State | – | Wesley Barrow Stadium | 3–5 | B. Burns (5–2) | S. Potter (0–2) | M. Rose (3) | 461 | 5–29 |
| April 13 | Georgia State | – | Wesley Barrow Stadium | 4–5 | J. Stuckey (3–1) | A. Shirley (0–3) | None | N/A | 5–30 |
| April 13 | Georgia State | – | Wesley Barrow Stadium | 5–6 (11) | C. Stanley (3–1) | R. Winter (2–3) | None | 418 | 5–31 |
| April 14 | Georgia State | – | Wesley Barrow Stadium | 3–2 | A. Smith (2–6) | N. Squeglia (3–1) | None | 385 | 6–31 |
| April 16 | at Southeastern Louisiana | – | Alumni Field | 2–7 | J. Hymel (5–3) | S. Laigast (0–2) | None | 889 | 6–23 |
| April 17 | at Tulane | – | Turchin Stadium | 2–3 | A. Reeves (1–0) | S. Potter (0–3) | I. Gibaut (8) | 2,160 | 6–33 |
| April 19 | at Oklahoma | – | L. Dale Mitchell Park | 0–10 | J. Gray (7–1) | B. Prest (1–6) | None | N/A | 6–34 |
| April 20 | at Oklahoma | – | L. Dale Mitchell Park | 5–14 | D. Overton (8–2) | A. Smith (2–7) | None | N/A | 6–35 |
| April 21 | at Oklahoma | – | L. Dale Mitchell Park | 3–14 | E. Carnes (2–1) | S. Speer (1–7) | None | 1,039 | 6–36 |
| April 23 | Nicholls State | – | Wesley Barrow Stadium | 5–16 | T. Byrd (5–3) | S. Potter (0–4) | None | 341 | 6–37 |
| April 24 | at Jackson State | – | Braddy Field | 6–9 | A. Rodriguez (4–0) | G. Manning (0–3) | None | 35 | 6–38 |
| April 26 | LSU-Alexandria | – | Wesley Barrow Stadium | 2–1 | A. Smith (3–7) | T. Olinde (1–3) | R. Winter (1) | 387 | 7–38 |
| April 27 | LSU-Alexandria | – | Wesley Barrow Stadium | 4–5 | P. Ingraffia (3–0) | G. Manning (0–4) | H. Wallace (4) | 418 | 7–39 |

May

| Date | Opponent | Rank | Site/stadium | Score | Win | Loss | Save | Attendance | Overall record |
|---|---|---|---|---|---|---|---|---|---|
| May 1 | at Tulane | – | Turchin Stadium | 1–3 | R. LeBlanc (3–3) | A. Smith (3–8) | I. Gibaut | 1,941 | 7–40 |
| May 2 | Mississippi Valley State | – | Summit, MS | Cancelled | | | | | |
| May 2 | Mississippi Valley State | – | Summit, MS | Cancelled | | | | | |
| May 14 | at #2 LSU | – | Alex Box Stadium | 2–11 | H. Newman (2–0) | A. Smith (3–9) | None | 5,534 | 7–41 |
| May 16 | at #28 Campbell | – | Jim Perry Stadium | 0–14 | R. Mattes (7–3) | B. Prest (1–7) | None | 216 | 7–42 |
| May 17 | at #28 Campbell | – | Jim Perry Stadium | 0–6 (11) | H. Bowers (9–0) | D. Martinez (0–3) | None | 306 | 7–43 |
| May 18 | at #28 Campbell | – | Jim Perry Stadium | 6–9 | R. Thompson (8–0) | S. Speer (1–8) | None | 354 | 7–44 |

== New Orleans Privateers in the 2013 Major League Baseball draft ==
The following members of the New Orleans Privateers baseball program were drafted in the 2013 MLB draft.

| Player | Position | Round | Overall | MLB team |
|---|---|---|---|---|
| Stone Speer | LHP | 25 | 758 | Tampa Bay Rays |
