= 2013 South Carolina Gamecocks baseball team =

American college baseball season

2013 South Carolina Gamecocks baseball

Columbia Regional Champion

Chapel Hill Super Regional, 1–2
- Conference: Southeastern Conference

Ranking
- Coaches: No. 12
- CB: No. 13
- Record: 43–20 (17–12 SEC)
- Head coach: Chad Holbrook (1st season)
- Assistant coaches: Jerry Meyers (3rd/11th season); Sammy Esposito (6th season)
- Home stadium: Carolina Stadium

2013 Southeastern Conference baseball standings
	Conf.				Overall
Team	W		L	PCT	W		L	PCT
Eastern
No. 9 Vanderbilt ^{x}‍†‍‍^{y}	26	–	3	.897	54	–	12	.818
No. 13 South Carolina ‍‍‍^{y}	17	–	12	.586	43	–	20	.683
Florida ‍‍‍^{y}	14	–	16	.467	29	–	30	.492
Kentucky ‍‍‍	11	–	19	.367	30	–	25	.545
Missouri ‍‍‍	10	–	20	.333	18	–	32	.360
Tennessee ‍‍‍	8	–	20	.286	22	–	30	.423
Georgia ‍‍‍	7	–	20	.259	21	–	32	.396
Western
No. 7 LSU ^{x}‍‍‡‍^{y}	23	–	7	.767	57	–	11	.838
No. 18 Arkansas ‍‍‍^{y}	18	–	11	.621	39	–	22	.639
No. 2 Mississippi State ‍‍‍^{y}	16	–	14	.533	51	–	20	.718
Ole Miss ‍‍‍^{y}	15	–	15	.500	38	–	24	.613
Alabama ‍‍‍^{y}	14	–	15	.483	35	–	28	.556
Texas A&M ‍‍‍^{y}	13	–	16	.448	34	–	29	.540
Auburn ‍‍‍	13	–	17	.433	33	–	23	.589
x – Division champion † – Conference champion ‡ – Tournament champion y – Invited to the NCAA tournament As of June 26, 2013; Rankings from Collegiate Baseball

The 2013 South Carolina Gamecocks baseball team represented the University of South Carolina in the 2013 NCAA Division I baseball season. The Gamecocks played their home games in Carolina Stadium. The team was coached by Chad Holbrook, who was in his first season as head coach at Carolina.

== Personnel ==
=== Roster ===
2013 South Carolina Gamecocks roster
Pitchers: 6 Joel Seddon - Sophomore; 10 Drake Thomason - Sophomore; 13 Jack Wynkoop - Freshman; 14 Evan Beal - Sophomore; 15 Nolan Belcher - Senior; 23 Vince Fiori - Freshman; 25 Adam Westmoreland - Senior; 27 Forrest Koumas - Junior; 34 Jordan Montgomery - Sophomore; 35 Curt Britt - Freshman; 37 Josh Knab - Junior; 38 Tyler Webb - Senior; 39 Patrick Sullivan - Senior; 43 Alex Satterfield - Freshman; 44 Colby Holmes - Senior; 46 Tyler Jackson - Freshman	Infielders: 4 Connor Bright - Sophomore; 9 Joey Pankake - Sophomore; 16 Chase Vergason - Senior; 19 DC Arendas - Freshman; 20 LB Dantzler - Senior; 22 Max Schrock - Freshman; 24 Brison Celek - Junior; 28 George Iskenderian - Freshman; 30 Erik Payne - Junior; 33 Kyle Martin - Sophomore	Catchers: 5 Patrick Harrington - Sophomore; 18 Dante Rosenberg - Senior; 21 Grayson Greiner - Sophomore; Outfielders: 3 Tanner English - Sophomore; 7 Shon Carson - Freshman; 8 TJ Costen - Sophomore; 11 Sean Sullivan - Senior; 26 Graham Saiko - Junior; 42 Ahmad Christian - Freshman

2013 South Carolina Gamecocks Baseball Roster & Bios http://gamecocksonline.cstv.com/sports/m-basebl/mtt/scar-m-basebl-mtt.html

=== Coaching staff ===
2013 South Carolina Gamecocks baseball coaching staff
- 2 Chad Holbrook – Head coach – 1 year
- 12 Jerry Meyers - Associate head coach - 3 years / 11 years
- 41 Sammy Esposito - Assistant coach - 6 years
- 55 Brian Buscher - Volunteer assistant coach - 1 year

2013 South Carolina Gamecocks Baseball Coaches & Bios http://gamecocksonline.cstv.com/sports/m-basebl/mtt/scar-m-basebl-mtt.html#coaches

== Schedule ==
2013 South Carolina Gamecocks baseball game log
Regular season
February

#	Date	Opponent	Site/stadium	Score	Win	Loss	Save	Attendance	Overall record	SEC record
1	February 15	Liberty	Carolina Stadium	4-3	Montgomery (1–0)	Herndon (0–1)	Webb (1)	8,242	1–0	–
–	February 16	Liberty	Carolina Stadium	Postponed						
2	February 17	Liberty	Carolina Stadium	8-7	Westmoreland (1–0)	Richardson (0–1)	None	7,513	2–0	–
3	February 17	Liberty	Carolina Stadium	2-3^{7}	Lambert (1–0)	Belcher (0–1)	Perritt (1)	7,513	2–1	–
–	February 22	Albany	Carolina Stadium	Postponed						
4	February 23	Albany	Carolina Stadium	8–3	Montgomery (2–0)	Graham (0–1)	Britt (1)	7,184	3–1	–
5	February 24	Albany	Carolina Stadium	14-1	Holmes (1–0)	Zielinski (0–2)	None	7,260	4–1	–
6	February 24	Albany	Carolina Stadium	6-4	Belcher (1-1)	Chase (0–2)	Webb (2)	7,260	5–1	–
7	February 26	Furman	Carolina Stadium	5-2	Wynkoop (1–0)	Warford (0–1)	Webb (3)	6,301	6–1	–

March

#	Date	Opponent	Site/stadium	Score	Win	Loss	Save	Attendance	Overall record	SEC record
8	March 1	@ Clemson	Doug Kingsmore Stadium	6-0	Montgomery (3–0)	Gossett (1-1)	None	6,016	7–1	–
9	March 2	vs. Clemson	Fluor Field	3-6	Schmidt (2–0)	Holmes (1-1)	Campbell (3)	7,125	7–2	–
10	March 3	Clemson	Carolina Stadium	8-0	Belcher (2–1)	Firth (2–1)	None	8,242	8–2	–
11	March 5	Ball State	Carolina Stadium	10-0	Wynkoop (2–0)	Bautista (0–2)	None	6,140	9–2	–
12	March 6	Ball State	Carolina Stadium	14-4	Sullivan (1–0)	Manering (0–2)	None	6,228	10–2	–
13	March 8	Rider	Carolina Stadium	2-0	Beal (1–0)	Smith (2–1)	Webb (4)	6,715	11–2	–
14	March 9	Rider	Carolina Stadium	9-5	Seddon (1–0)	Sowa (2–1)	Westmoreland (1)	7,231	12–2	–
15	March 10	Rider	Carolina Stadium	1-0	Belcher (3–1)	Murphy (1–2)	Webb (5)	7,031	13–2	–
16	March 12	South Carolina Upstate	Carolina Stadium	12-3	Wynkoop (3–0)	Cox (1–2)	Sullivan (1)	6,447	14–2	–
17	March 13	Davidson	Carolina Stadium	12-4	Britt (1–0)	Caudill (0–1)	None	6,450	15–2	–
18	March 15	@ Missouri	Taylor Stadium	4-1	Beal (2–0)	Zastryzny (1–3)	Webb (6)	3,145	16–2	1–0
19	March 16	@ Missouri	Taylor Stadium	2-0	Belcher (4–1)	Graves (0–2)	Webb (7)	826	17–2	2–0
20	March 16	@ Missouri	Taylor Stadium	0-4	Steele (2–0)	Holmes (1–2)	None	826	17–3	2–1
21	March 19	@ The Citadel	Joseph P. Riley Jr. Park	9-5	Wynkoop (4–0)	Cribb (1–2)	Webb (8)	5,838	18–3	–
22	March 22	Arkansas	Carolina Stadium	3-15	Astin (2–1)	Beal (2–1)	None	7,616	18–4	2–2
23	March 23	Arkansas	Carolina Stadium	2-4	Stanek (2–1)	Belcher (4–2)	None	7,509	18–5	2–3
24	March 24	Arkansas	Carolina Stadium	3-5^{11}	Killian (3–2)	Webb (0–1)	Suggs (1)	7,208	18–6	2–4
25	March 26	@ College of Charleston	CofC Baseball Stadium at Patriot's Point	3-1	Holmes (2-2)	Helvey (2-2)	Westmoreland (2)	1,526	19–6	–
26	March 28	Texas A&M	Carolina Stadium	3-2	Westmoreland (2–0)	Freeman (1-1)	Webb (9)	6,949	20–6	3–4
27	March 29	Texas A&M	Carolina Stadium	6-4	Belcher (5–2)	Martin (2–4)	Webb (10)	7,943	21–6	4–4
28	March 30	Texas A&M	Carolina Stadium	6-3	Westmoreland (3–0)	Jester (2–1)	Webb (11)	8,242	22–6	5–4

April

#	Date	Opponent	Site/stadium	Score	Win	Loss	Save	Attendance	Overall record	SEC record
29	April 2	Charleston Southern	Carolina Stadium	9-5	Holmes (3–2)	Leopard (1–2)	None	8,114	23–6	–
30	April 3	@ Furman	Fluor Field	5-6	Carlson (3–1)	Wynkoop (4–1)	Solter (6)	4,738	23–7	–
31	April 5	@ Tennessee	Lindsey Nelson Stadium	5-4	Webb (1-1)	Godley (2–3)	None	3,110	24–7	6–4
32	April 6	@ Tennessee	Lindsey Nelson Stadium	12-8	Westmoreland (4–0)	Williams (1–2)	None	2,454	25–7	7–4
33	April 7	@ Tennessee	Lindsey Nelson Stadium	19-2	Holmes (4–2)	Godley (2–4)	None	2,637	26–7	8–4
34	April 9	The Citadel	Carolina Stadium	6-5	Britt (2–0)	Rivera (4–1)	None	7,721	27–7	–
35	April 11	@ Florida	McKethan Stadium	2-3	Crawford (2–5)	Belcher (5–3)	Magliozzi (7)	3,268	27–8	8–5
36	April 12	@ Florida	McKethan Stadium	3-4	Rhodes (1–0)	Westmoreland (4–1)	Magliozzi (8)	4,515	27–9	8–6
37	April 13	@ Florida	McKethan Stadium	5-14	Gibson (2–0)	Wynkoop (4–2)	None	4,374	27–10	8–7
38	April 16	College of Charleston	Carolina Stadium	10-6	Fiori (1–0)	Loving (1–2)	None	7,433	28–10	–
–	April 19	Kentucky	Carolina Stadium	Postponed						
39	April 20	Kentucky	Carolina Stadium	5-2	Belcher (6–3)	Reed (2–5)	Westmoreland (3)	7,411	29–10	9–7
40	April 20	Kentucky	Carolina Stadium	7-6^{11}	Webb (2–1)	Gott (4–1)	None	8,148	30–10	10–7
41	April 21	Kentucky	Carolina Stadium	3-1	Wynkoop (5–2)	Littrell (4–3)	Webb (12)	8,024	31–10	11–7
42	April 23	@ Gardner-Webb	Veteran's Field at Keeter Stadium	6-7	Warner (3–0)	Seddon (1-1)	None	4,825	31–11	–
43	April 26	@ LSU	Alex Box Stadium	2-5	Nola (8–0)	Belcher (6–4)	None	9,006	31–12	12–7
44	April 27	@ LSU	Alex Box Stadium	4-2	Westmoreland (5–1)	Cotton (2–1)	Webb (13)	10,246	32–12	12–8
45	April 28	@ LSU	Alex Box Stadium	4-0	Wynkoop (6–2)	McCune (3–1)	Webb (14)	6,380	33–12	13–8

May

#	Date	Opponent	Site/stadium	Score	Win	Loss	Save	Attendance	Overall record	SEC record
46	May 3	Vanderbilt	Carolina Stadium	2-3	Ziomek (9–2)	Belcher (6–5)	Miller (13)	8,081	33–13	13–9
47	May 4	Vanderbilt	Carolina Stadium	2-5	Beede (12–0)	Montgomery (3–1)	Fulmer (4)	8,029	33–14	13–10
–	May 5	Vanderbilt	Carolina Stadium	Canceled						
48	May 8	Wofford	Carolina Stadium	9-3	Westmoreland (6–1)	Stillman (2-2)	None	7,193	34–14	–
49	May 10	Georgia	Carolina Stadium	7-2	Belcher (7–5)	McLaughlin (4–6)	None	7,809	35–14	14–10
50	May 11	Georgia	Carolina Stadium	7-1	Montgomery (4–1)	Dieterich (2–3)	None	8,242	36–14	15–10
51	May 12	Georgia	Carolina Stadium	8-3	Wynkoop (7–2)	Walsh (2–4)	None	7,478	37–14	16–10
52	May 14	Presbyterian	Carolina Stadium	4-3	Sullivan (2–0)	Corbin (2–4)	Webb (15)	7,827	38–14	–
53	May 16	@ Mississippi State	Dudy Noble Field	4-5	Girodo (6–1)	Webb (2-2)	Holder (15)	6,755	38–15	16–11
54	May 17	@ Mississippi State	Dudy Noble Field	5-3	Westmoreland (7–1)	Bradford (0–1)	Webb (16)	6,932	39–15	17–11
55	May 18	@ Mississippi State	Dudy Noble Field	2-7	Mitchell (10–0)	Wynkoop (7–3)	None	7,687	39–16	17–12

Post-season
SEC Tournament

#	Date	Opponent	Site/stadium	Score	Win	Loss	Save	Attendance	Overall record	SECT record
56	May 22	Mississippi State	Hoover Metropolitan Stadium	3-5	Gentry (4–0)	Westmoreland (7–2)	None	5,913	39–17	0–1
57	May 23	Vanderbilt	Hoover Metropolitan Stadium	3-4^{10}	Fulmer (2–0)	Westmoreland (7–3)	None	5,705	39–18	0–2

NCAA Regionals

#	Date	Opponent	Site/stadium	Score	Win	Loss	Save	Attendance	Overall record	NCAAT record
58	May 31	Saint Louis	Carolina Stadium	7-3	Webb (3–2)	Smith (8–3)	None	7,437	40–18	1–0
59	June 1	Liberty	Carolina Stadium	19-3	Montgomery (5–1)	Roy (7–6)	None	7,816	41–18	2–0
-	June 2	Liberty	Carolina Stadium	Suspended						
60	June 3	Liberty	Carolina Stadium	6-4	Holmes (5–2)	Perritt (3–2)	Webb (17)	7,391	42–18	3–0

NCAA Super Regionals

#	Date	Opponent	Site/stadium	Score	Win	Loss	Save	Attendance	Overall record	NCAAT record
61	June 8	North Carolina	Boshamer Stadium	5-6	Thornton (10–1)	Webb (3-3)	None	4,355	42–19	3–1
62	June 9	North Carolina	Boshamer Stadium	8-0	Montgomery (6–1)	Johnson (4–1)	None	4,365	43–19	4–1
–	June 10	North Carolina	Boshamer Stadium	Postponed						
63	June 11	North Carolina	Boshamer Stadium	4-5	Thornton (11–1)	Westmoreland (7–4)	Emanuel (1)	4,100	43–20	4–2

2013 South Carolina Gamecocks Baseball Schedule http://gamecocksonline.cstv.com/sports/m-basebl/sched/scar-m-basebl-sched.html

== Honors and awards ==
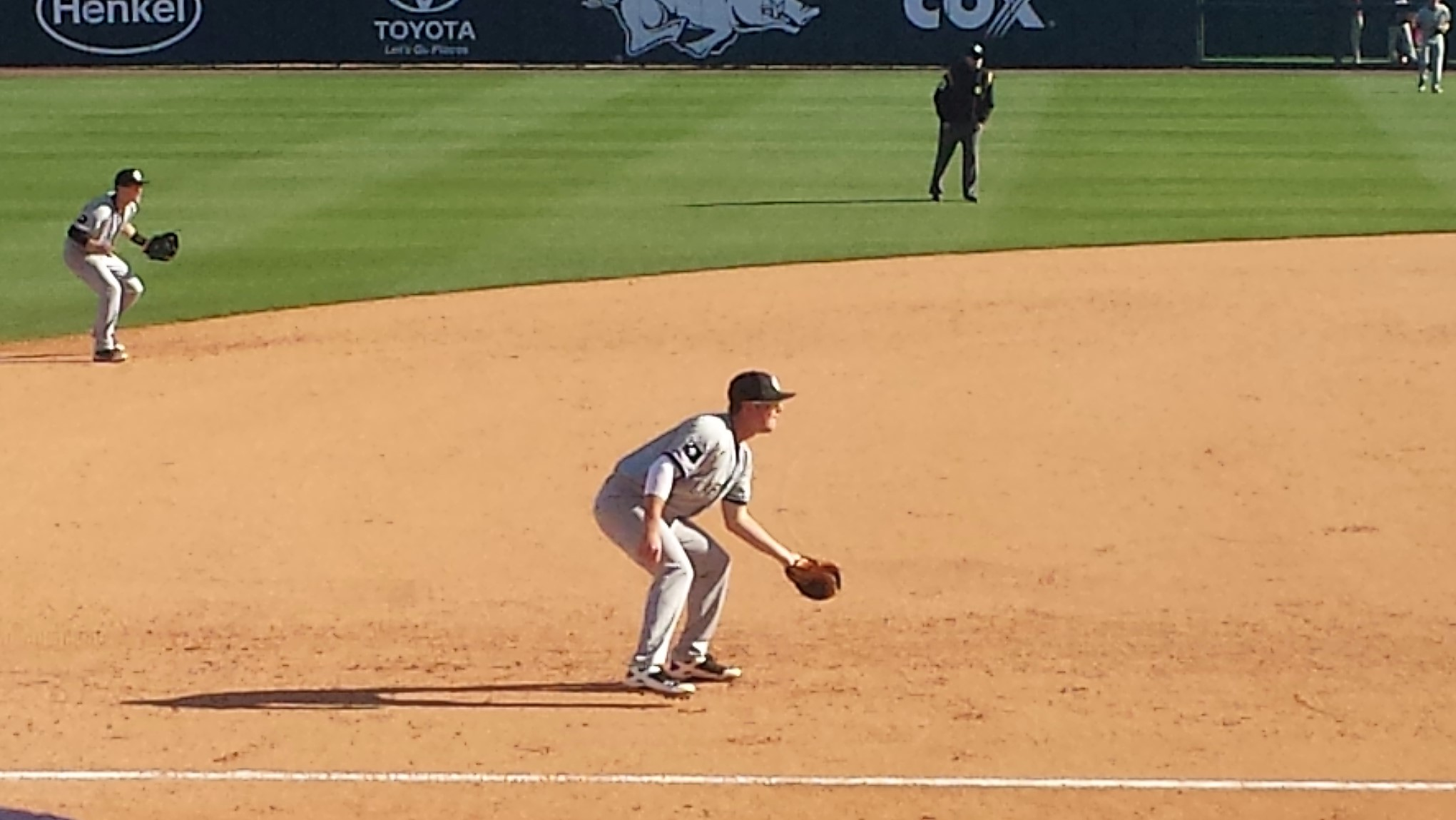
LB Dantzler playing third base against Arkansas at Baum Stadium

- LB Dantzler was named SEC Player of the Week on February 25.
- Grayson Greiner was named Second-Team All-SEC.
- Joey Pankake was named Collegiate Baseball's National Player of the Week and SEC Player of the Week on March 11.
- Max Schrock was named SEC Freshman of the Week on April 8.
- Tyler Webb was named Third-Team All-American by Collegiate Baseball and Second-Team All-SEC.
- Jack Wynkoop was named SEC Freshman of the Week on April 22 and April 29, and was named to the SEC All-Freshman Team.

== Notes ==
- On February 24, three pitchers combined to throw the first South Carolina no-hitter since March 26, 1975.

== Record vs. conference opponents ==
Last two do not qualify for conf. tourn. Blank are not scheduled. Blue are home games, otherwise away.

2013 SEC baseball records Source: 2013 SEC baseball game results, 2013 SEC baseball schedule
Team	W–L	ALA	ARK	AUB	FLA	UGA	KEN	LSU	MSU	MIZZ	MISS	SCAR	TENN	TAMU	VAN	Team	Div	SR	SW
ALA	14–15		1–2	2–1	.	3–0	.	1–2	0–3	2–1	0–3	.	2–1	2–0	1–2	ALA	W5	5–5	1–2
ARK	18–11	2–1		1–2	.	2–0	2–1	1–2	2–1	.	1–2	3–0	2–1	2–1	.	ARK	W2	7–3	1–0
AUB	13–17	1–2	2–1		2–1	2–1	.	0–3	1–2	1–2	2–1	.	.	2–1	0–3	AUB	W7	5–5	0–2
FLA	14–16	.	.	1–2		1–2	1–2	0–3	1–2	2–1	2–1	3–0	2–1	.	1–2	FLA	E3	4–6	1–1
UGA	7–20	0–3	0–2	1–2	2–1		1–2	.	.	1–2	.	0–3	1–0	0–3	1–2	UGA	E7	1–8	0–3
KEN	11–19	.	1–2	.	2–1	2–1		0–3	2–1	1–2	2–1	0–3	1–2	.	0–3	KEN	E4	4–6	0–3
LSU	23–7	2–1	2–1	3–0	3–0	.	3–0		2–1	3–0	2–1	1–2	.	2–1	.	LSU	W1	9–1	4–0
MSU	16–14	3–0	1–2	2–1	2–1	.	1–2	1–2		.	1–2	2–1	.	3–0	0–3	MSU	W3	5–5	2–1
MIZZ	10–20	1–2	.	2–1	1–2	2–1	2–1	0–3	.		.	1–2	1–2	0–3	0–3	MIZZ	E5	3–7	0–3
MISS	15–15	3–0	2–1	1–2	1–2	.	1–2	1–2	2–1	.		.	3–0	1–2	0–3	MISS	W4	4–6	2–1
SCAR	17–12	.	0–3	.	0–3	3–0	3–0	2–1	1–2	2–1	.		3–0	3–0	0–2	SCAR	E2	6–4	4–2
TENN	8–20	1–2	1–2	.	1–2	0–1	2–1	.	.	2–1	0–3	0–3		1–2	0–3	TENN	E6	2–7	0–3
TAMU	13–16	0–2	1–2	1–2	.	3–0	.	1–2	0–3	3–0	2–1	0–3	2–1		.	TAMU	W6	4–6	2–2
VAN	26–3	2–1	.	3–0	2–1	2–1	3–0	.	3–0	3–0	3–0	2–0	3–0	.		VAN	E1	10–0	6–0
Team	W–L	ALA	ARK	AUB	FLA	UGA	KEN	LSU	MSU	MIZZ	MISS	SCAR	TENN	TAMU	VAN	Team	Div	SR	SW

Updated for entire regular season.

== Rankings ==
Ranking movements Legend: ██ Increase in ranking ██ Decrease in ranking — = Not ranked
	Week																		
Poll	Pre	1	2	3	4	5	6	7	8	9	10	11	12	13	14	15	16	17	Final
Coaches'	5	5*	8	7	6	6	14	11	8	14	10	9	12	12	12	14	—	—	12
Baseball America	7	7	7	6	5	5	17	15	11	18	15	15	15	14	17	18	—	—	14
Collegiate Baseball^	7	7	7	6	5	5	14	14	12	22	15	15	16	15	15	13	11	13	13
NCBWA†	6	7	8	8	6	6	13	12	10	15	11	9	12	12	14	16	15	13	13

^ Collegiate Baseball ranked 40 teams in their preseason poll, but only ranked 30 teams weekly during the season.
† NCBWA ranks 30 teams in their preseason poll, but only ranks 25 teams weekly during the season.
* A new poll was not released for this week, so for comparison purposes, the previous week's ranking is inserted in this week's slot.

== Gamecocks in the 2013 MLB draft ==
The following members of the South Carolina Gamecocks baseball program were drafted in the 2013 Major League Baseball draft.

Player	Position	Round	Overall	MLB team
Tyler Webb	LHP	10th	314th	New York Yankees
LB Dantzler	1B	14th	415th	Toronto Blue Jays
Adam Westmoreland	LHP	26th	772nd	Miami Marlins
Brison Celek	1B	31st	925th	Toronto Blue Jays
