= John Savage (baseball) =

American baseball coach (born 1965)

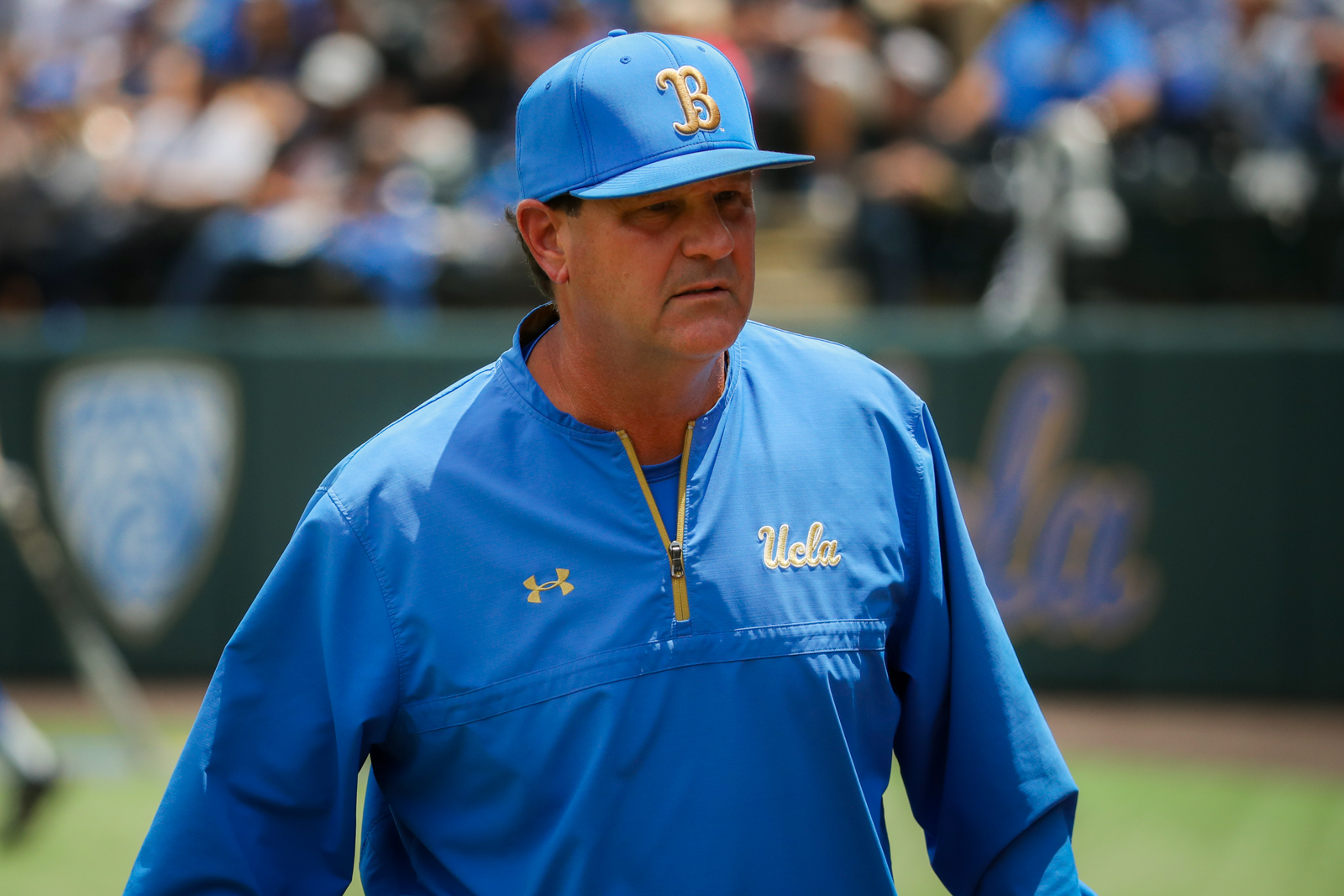

Current position
- Title: Head coach
- Team: UCLA
- Conference: Big Ten
- Record: 776–481–2 (.617)

Biographical details
- Born: February 27, 1965 (age 61); Reno, Nevada, U.S.
- Education: University of Nevada

Playing career
- 1984–1986: Santa Clara
- 1986: Billings Mustangs
- 1987: Salt Lake City Trappers
- 1987: Boise Hawks
- 1988: Reno Silver Sox
- Position: Pitcher

Coaching career (HC unless noted)
- 1988: Reno HS (assistant)
- 1992–1996: Nevada (assistant)
- 1997–2000: USC (PC)
- 2002–2004: UC Irvine
- 2005–present: UCLA

Head coaching record
- Overall: 864–573–3 (.601)
- Tournaments: NCAA: 53–31

Accomplishments and honors

Championships
- College World Series (2013); 4× CWS Appearances (2010, 2012, 2013, 2025); 4× PAC-12 (2011, 2012, 2015, 2019); 2× Big Ten (2025, 2026); Big Ten Tournament (2026)

Awards
- Skip Bertman Coach of the Year, College Baseball Hall of Fame (2026); Baseball America National Coach of the Year (2013); ABCA National Coach of the Year (2013); Collegiate Baseball Newspaper National Coach of the Year (2013); National Coach of the Year, CollegeBaseballInsider.com (2010); National Pitching Coach of the Year, Collegiate Baseball Newspaper (2019); Big Ten Coach of the Year (2026); Pac-12 Coach of the Year (2015, 2019); ABCA West Region Coach of the Year (2013, 2019, 2026); Collegiate Baseball Newspaper Assistant Coach of Year (1998)

John Joseph Savage (born February 27, 1965) is an American college baseball coach and former pitcher, who currently serves as the head baseball coach for the UCLA Bruins. He played college baseball at Santa Clara for coaches Jerry McClain and John Oldham from 1984 to 1986 before playing in Minor League Baseball (MiLB) for three seasons (1986-1988). After serving as an assistant coach with Nevada and USC in the 1990s, he became the head coach for the UC Irvine Anteaters (2002–04). Savage became UCLA's head baseball coach in July 2004 and has guided the Bruins in that role for the past 22 seasons.

Savage is one of two head coaches in college baseball history, alongside Vanderbilt's Tim Corbin, to have guided his team to a College World Series title, produced the No. 1 overall MLB Draft selection (twice, in 2011 and 2026), coached a Golden Spikes Award winner, and had a former player win the Cy Young Award in Major League Baseball (twice, in 2020 and 2023).

He is one of six coaches all-time with to have led his college program to the College World Series title and produced a No. 1 MLB Draft pick and at least one Golden Spikes Award winner, joining a group of current and former head coaches in Corbin, Skip Bertman (LSU), Jim Brock (Arizona State), Augie Garrido (Cal State Fullerton, Texas) and Jim Morris (Miami).

== Early career ==
Before becoming a college baseball coach, Savage played two years with the Cincinnati Reds organization, after three years playing at Santa Clara University. In 1987, he helped the Salt Lake City Trappers set a professional baseball record of 29 consecutive victories.

In 1991, Savage received his bachelor's degree in secondary education from the University of Nevada.

Savage's coaching career started at his alma mater Reno (NV) High School as a pitching coach in 1988. Between 1992 and 2000, Savage served as an assistant coach at Nevada and USC. During this period, his teams won one national championship, played in five regionals and advanced to two NCAA Super Regionals.

== Head coaching career ==
=== UC Irvine ===
Savage served as head coach for the UC Irvine Anteaters baseball program from 2002 to 2004. Under him, UC Irvine compiled a record of 88-84-1 (32-34 conference) through three seasons and participated in the South Bend Regional in 2004.

=== UCLA ===
Savage has served as UCLA's head baseball coach since the summer of 2004. Savage guided UCLA to its first and only NCAA Championship in baseball in June 2013. While at UCLA, Savage has recorded the most postseason victories of any head coach in program history. In addition, he has seen 30 of his former UCLA players advance to Major League Baseball (since 2005).

Savage has become one of six college baseball head coaches to have won the College World Series (2013), produced the No. 1 overall selection in the MLB Draft (Gerrit Cole in 2011) and coached the winner of the annual Golden Spikes Award (Trevor Bauer in 2011). In fact, Savage has produced two of the No. 1 overall MLB Draft selections with Cole in 2011 and Roch Cholowsky in 2026.

Savage's career at UCLA began in the summer of 2004. Two years in, he had UCLA in the postseason. Bolstered by an exceptional incoming class in the fall of 2005, the Bruins advanced to the NCAA Malibu Regional (at Pepperdine) in 2006. UCLA's strong 2006 season came on the heels of a challenging 15-41 campaign in 2005. The Bruins' 2006 squad went 33-25.

In 2007, Savage's third year at UCLA, the Bruins earned their first NCAA Super Regional appearance since 2000. UCLA posted a 33-28 overall record and secured the No. 2 seed in NCAA Regional action at Long Beach State. UCLA's team swept the Long Beach Regional with wins over Pepperdine, Illinois-Chicago and Long Beach State, but lost the Super Regional to Cal State Fullerton. The Bruins used just three pitches in three wins at the Long Beach Regional (Tyson Brummett, Gavin Brooks and Tim Murphy).

UCLA's 2008 squad advanced to the NCAA tournament, marking the first time in program history that the Bruins had earned three consecutive trips to the NCAA tournament. The Bruins were ranked No. 1 in the preseason Baseball America poll that year. During the regular season, UCLA played 18 games against teams ranked in Baseball America's weekly top-25 poll. Savage helped lead the Bruins to series victories in three of the team's four Pac-10 road series.

In 2010, Savage's team advanced to the College World Series by defeating the defending National Champion LSU Tigers in the Los Angeles Regional and the Cal State Fullerton Titans in the Los Angeles Super Regional. The Bruins finished the season in second place, losing two games to the South Carolina Gamecocks in the Championship Series. He was named the National Coach of the Year by CollegeBaseballInsider.com in 2010. He was also named 2010 NCAA Division I Western Regional Coach of the Year by the American Baseball Coaches Association (ABCA).

In 2011, UCLA again returned to postseason play, backed by the strong pitching of Gerrit Cole, Trevor Bauer and freshman Adam Plutko. The Bruins compiled a 35-24 overall record and won the Pac-10 Conference with an 18-9 mark in league play.

In 2012, he led UCLA to the College World Series by defeating TCU in the Los Angeles Super Regional. The Bruins went 1-2 in their trip to the College World Series, defeating Stony Brook before dropping consecutive games to Arizona and Florida State in the second round.

In 2013, he guided UCLA to the College World Series by defeating Cal State Fullerton in the Super Regional. This was the team's third appearance in the College World Series in four years. The team defeated No. 1-seed North Carolina (4–1) to advance to the Championship series where they beat Mississippi State to win the NCAA national title. Savage was named the National Coach of the Year by Collegiate Baseball Newspaper and Baseball America, and the ABCA West Region Coach of the Year. After winning the first national CWS championship, Savage agreed to extend his contract with UCLA to 2025 with an increase in salary.

In 2015, Savage guided the Bruins back to postseason play, earning the No. 1 overall seed in the NCAA tournament. UCLA hosted the NCAA Los Angeles Regional at Jackie Robinson Stadium, but was eliminated in regional play. UCLA's 2015 squad finished the season with an overall record of 45-16.

UCLA returned to the NCAA tournament in both 2017 and 2018. The Bruins finished 30–27 in 2017, advancing to the Long Beach Regional. In 2018, Savage guided UCLA to a 38-21 overall record and a 19-11 mark in Pac-12 play. The Bruins ranked sixth nationally in team ERA, seventh in WHIP, and were one of only two Division I teams to finish in the top 10 in both ERA and fielding percentage (in 2018). UCLA defeated Gonzaga in the opening game of the Minneapolis Regional before suffering two losses to host Minnesota and being eliminated.

In 2019, Savage earned Pac-12 Coach of the Year and ABCA West Region Coach of the Year honors after leading the Bruins to one of the most successful seasons in program history. UCLA went 52-11 (setting a school record for wins), claimed the Pac-12 title, spent a program-record 12 consecutive weeks atop the national rankings, and earned the No. 1 overall seed in the NCAA tournament for the second time ever. UCLA won all 14 of its regular-season series, a first in program history.

Savage picked up a pair of milestone wins during the 2019 season, earning his 500th career victory at UCLA after a Friday night win against Oregon State (March 15). He notched career win No. 600 when the Bruins defeated East Carolina (April 12). Savage managed a pitching staff that led the NCAA in team ERA (2.60). No other team finished with an ERA under 3.00 and only one team logged an ERA within one half-run of UCLA. The Bruins also paced the nation in shutouts (throwing a program-record 11), hits allowed per nine innings (6.18), and WHIP (1.05) while ranking in the top-10 in strikeout-to-walk ratio (3.13, fourth) and strikeouts per nine innings (10.2, seventh). Junior right-hander Ryan Garcia (10-1, 1.44 ERA) was named the Pac-12 Pitcher of the Year and a consensus first team All-America selection. Sophomore closer Holden Powell (17 saves, 1.84 ERA) was dubbed the NCBWA Stopper of the Year. A program-record 13 Bruins were selected in the 2019 MLB First-Year Player Draft, including Michael Toglia (23rd overall, Colorado) who became UCLA's first position player to be picked in the first round since Chase Utley in 2000. UCLA had the most day one picks of any NCAA team, and finished tied with Vanderbilt for the most selections overall.

In 2020, the Bruins opened the season with a 13-2 overall record. UCLA won its first 11 games of the season and had gone 13-2 before the season was suspended due to the outbreak of a global pandemic. The season was not resumed, postseason play was canceled, and UCLA concluded its abbreviated baseball season with 13 wins in 15 games. Under Savage's direction, UCLA's pitching staff had compiled a 1.88 ERA. The Bruins' offense had batted .308 through 15 games.

In 2021, the Bruins earned their fourth consecutive postseason appearance, advancing to the NCAA Regional at Texas Tech. UCLA defeated Army and North Carolina in the elimination bracket to advance to the NCAA Regional Final, closing the season with a 37-20 record and an 18-12 mark in the Pac-12. JT Schwartz finished the season as the Pac-12 Conference’s regular-season batting champion (.396 average), joining five other Bruins on the All-Pac-12 Team. The Bruins' pitching staff finished among the top three schools in the Pac-12 in team ERA (3.95) and strikeouts per nine innings (9.39). UCLA's program had a nation-leading 10 players selected in the 2021 MLB Draft, including first-round pick Matt McClain (Cincinnati Reds). Two players – JT Schwartz and Nick Nastrini – were chosen in the fourth round of the MLB Draft.

In 2022, UCLA compiled a 40-24 overall record and advanced to the NCAA Regional at Auburn. After finishing in third place in the Pac-12 standings, the Bruins overcame a loss to Florida State in the regional opener with wins against Southeastern Louisiana and Florida State in the elimination bracket. The Bruins came up short in the championship portion of the NCAA Regional, losing to top-seeded Auburn. Four of UCLA's freshmen secured Freshman All-America honors from Collegiate Baseball, and two of those individuals were honored as Freshman All-America selections by the NCBWA. UCLA had six players selected to the year-end All-Pac-12 team, including pitchers Max Rajcic, Alonzo Tredwell and Ethan Flanagan, along with catcher Darius Perry, shortstop Cody Schrier and first baseman Jake Palmer.

Following the 2023 (28-24-1) and 2024 (19-33) seasons – the first time under John Savage that UCLA missed the postseason in consecutive years (amid key injuries and a relatively inexperienced roster) – the Bruins rebounded in a big way in 2025. In the program's inaugural season in the Big Ten Conference, UCLA finished 48-18, earned a share of the conference regular-season title, and advanced to its first College World Series since winning the national championship in 2013. The season marked the program's return to national prominence and set the stage for a historic 2026 campaign. The turnaround was led by UCLA's highly touted sophomore class, which had been ranked No. 1 nationally when entering the program as recruits. Shortstop Roch Cholowsky emerged as one of college baseball's top players, earning Baseball America and ABCA/Rawlings National Player of the Year honors, as well as Big Ten Player of the Year and Defensive Player of the Year. Fellow sophomores Mulivai Levu, Roman Martin, Phoenix Call, and Dean West also played key roles. UCLA swept the Los Angeles Regional and Super Regional to advance to the College World Series, where it defeated Murray State before losses to LSU and Arkansas. The appearance was UCLA's first in Omaha since 2013 and Savage's fourth College World Series with the program.

UCLA’s 2026 squad enjoyed one of the finest seasons in program history. The Bruins went 52-8 overall and posted a 28-2 record in the Big Ten. In their second season as members of the Big Ten, the Bruins won both the regular-season and conference tournament championships, earned the No. 1 overall seed in the NCAA Tournament, and were ranked No. 1 in every major collegiate baseball poll for nearly the entire regular season. UCLA spent virtually the entire year atop the national rankings, cementing its status as the consensus top team in college baseball. Under Savage’s guidance, the Bruins featured standout shortstop Roch Cholowsky, who became the first overall selection in the 2026 MLB draft after helping lead UCLA to a 51–6 regular-season record. In all, the Bruins saw 10 of their players chosen in the MLB Draft. Cholowsky became the second No. 1 overall pick under Savage’s time at UCLA (joining Gerrit Cole, from the 2011 draft). In addition, Cholowsky became the first Big Ten player to ever get chosen No. 1 overall.

=== Record ===
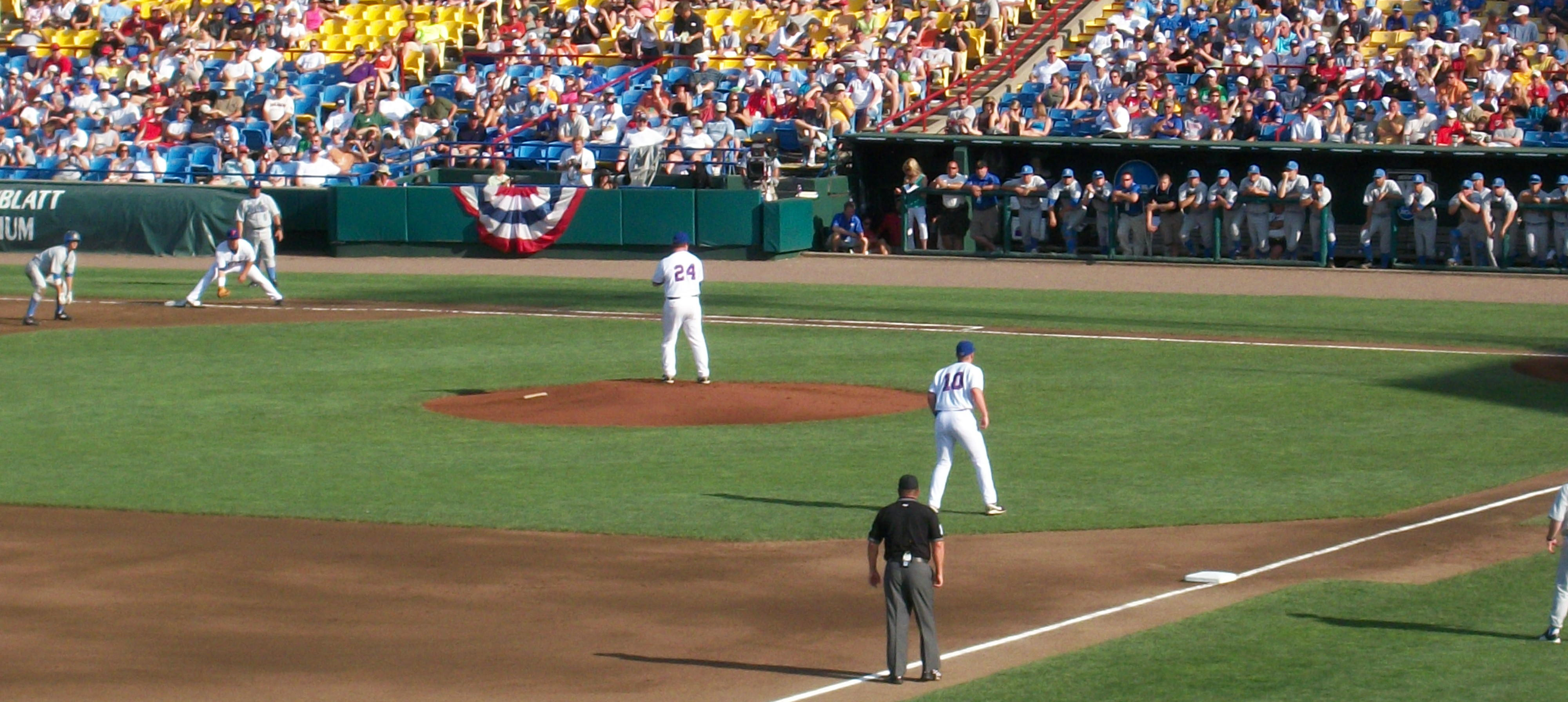
UCLA vs. Florida at the 2010 CWS

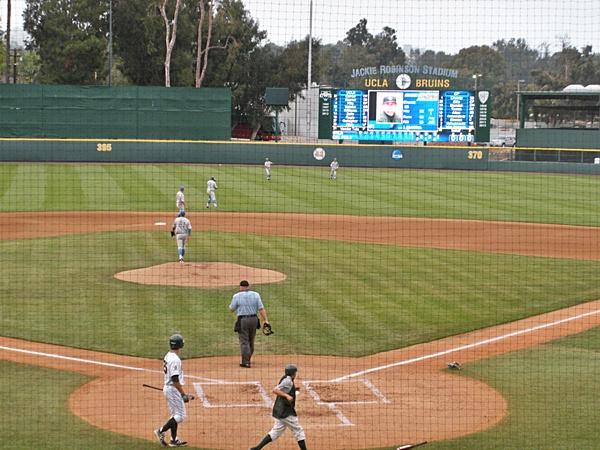
The Cal Poly Mustangs vs. the UCLA Bruins at the 2013 L.A. Regional at Jackie Robinson Stadium on June 1, 2013

Record table
Season	Team	Overall	Conference	Standing	Postseason
UC Irvine Anteaters (Big West Conference) (2002–2004)
2002	UC Irvine	33–26	14–10	T–4th	
2003	UC Irvine	21–35	8–13	T–5th	
2004	UC Irvine	34–23–1	10–11	T–4th	NCAA Regional
UC Irvine:		88–84–1 (.512)	32–34 (.485)		
UCLA Bruins (Pac-12 Conference) (2005–2024)
2005	UCLA	15–41	4–20	8th	
2006	UCLA	33–25	13–10	3rd	NCAA Regional
2007	UCLA	33–28	14–10	3rd	NCAA Super Regional
2008	UCLA	33–27	13–11	3rd	NCAA Regional
2009	UCLA	27–29	15–12	T–3rd	
2010	UCLA	51–17	18–9	2nd	College World Series Runner-up
2011	UCLA	35–24	18–9	1st	NCAA Regional
2012	UCLA	48–16	20–10	T–1st	College World Series
2013	UCLA	49–17	21–9	3rd	College World Series Champions
2014	UCLA	25–30–1	12–18	9th	
2015	UCLA	45–16	22–8	1st	NCAA Regional
2016	UCLA	25–31	12–18	10th	
2017	UCLA	30–27	19–11	3rd	NCAA Regional
2018	UCLA	38–21	19–11	4th	NCAA Regional
2019	UCLA	52–11	24–5	1st	NCAA Super Regional
2020	UCLA	13–2	0–0		Season canceled due to COVID-19
2021	UCLA	37–20	18–12	4th	NCAA Regional
2022	UCLA	40–24	19–11	3rd	NCAA Regional
2023	UCLA	28–24–1	12–16–1	7th	Pac-12 tournament
2024	UCLA	19–33	9–21	T–10th	
UCLA Bruins (Big Ten Conference) (2025–present)
2025	UCLA	48–18	22–8	T–1st	College World Series
2026	UCLA	52–8	28–2	1st	NCAA Regional
UCLA:		776–489–2 (.613)			
Total:		864–573–3 (.601)			
National champion Postseason invitational champion Conference regular season champion Conference regular season and conference tournament champion Division regular season champion Division regular season and conference tournament champion Conference tournament champion

== First-Round Draft selections ==
While at UCLA, Savage has coached nine players who have been selected in the MLB Draft's first round (includes first-round compensation selections).

- David Huff (39th overall, Cleveland Indians, 2006 MLB draft)
- Gerrit Cole (1st overall, Pittsburgh Pirates, 2011 MLB draft)
- Trevor Bauer (3rd overall, Arizona Diamondbacks, 2011 MLB draft)
- Jeff Gelalich (57th overall, Cincinnati Reds, 2012 MLB draft)
- James Kaprielian (16th overall, New York Yankees, 2015 MLB draft)
- Michael Toglia (23rd overall, Colorado Rockies, 2019 MLB draft)
- Garrett Mitchell (20th overall, Milwaukee Brewers, 2020 MLB draft)
- Matt McClain (17th overall, Cincinnati Reds, 2021 MLB draft)
- Roch Cholowsky (1st overall, Chicago White Sox, 2026 MLB draft)

== USA Collegiate National team ==
Savage served as the manager for USA Baseball's Collegiate National Team in the summer of 2017. He led the U.S. team to a 15-5 record that summer, including an 11-4 mark during international play. The United States won all three international series in which it competed, going 4-0 against Chinese Taipei and 3-2 versus both Cuba and Japan. The win over Cuba marked the third consecutive series win for the United States.

== Personal ==
John Savage is from Reno, Nevada where he grew up with two brothers, Len and Pete. He attended Reno High School, where he was a record-setting right-handed pitcher. Savage and his wife, Lisa, have four children: Julia, Jack, Ryan and Gabrielle. He is also the son-in-law of former Nevada Wolf Pack football coach Chris Ault. Savage was inducted into Reno High School's Athletic Hall of Fame in 1997.

== See also ==
- List of current NCAA Division I baseball coaches
