= 2013 UCLA Bruins baseball team =

American college baseball season

2013 UCLA Bruins baseball

Los Angeles Regional champions Fullerton Super Regional champions NCAA CWS National champions

College World Series final vs. Mississippi State, W 3–1, W 8–0
- Conference: Pac-12 Conference
- Record: 49–17–0 (21–10 Pac-12)
- Head coach: John Savage (9th season)
- Assistant coaches: Jake Silverman (3rd season); T. J. Bruce (3rd season); Rex Peters (2nd season)
- Home stadium: Jackie Robinson Stadium

2013 Pac-12 Conference baseball standings
	Conf.						Overall
Team	W		L		T	PCT	W		L		T	PCT
No. 4 Oregon State ‍†‍‍^{y}	24	–	6	–	0	.800	52	–	12	–	0	.813
No. 17 Oregon ‍‍‍^{y}	22	–	8	–	0	.733	48	–	16	–	0	.750
No. 1 UCLA ‍‍‍^{y}	21	–	9	–	0	.700	46	–	17	–	0	.730
No. 19 Arizona State ‍‍‍^{y}	16	–	14	–	0	.533	37	–	22	–	1	.625
Stanford ‍‍‍	16	–	14	–	0	.533	32	–	22	–	0	.593
Arizona ‍‍‍	15	–	15	–	0	.500	34	–	21	–	0	.618
Washington ‍‍‍	15	–	15	–	0	.500	24	–	32	–	0	.429
California ‍‍‍	10	–	20	–	0	.333	23	–	31	–	0	.426
Southern California ‍‍‍	10	–	20	–	0	.333	20	–	36	–	0	.357
Washington State ‍‍‍	9	–	21	–	0	.300	23	–	32	–	0	.418
Utah ‍‍‍	7	–	23	–	0	.233	21	–	31	–	0	.404
† – Conference champion y – Invited to the NCAA tournament As of June 22, 2013; Rankings from Collegiate Baseball

The 2013 UCLA Bruins baseball team represented the University of California, Los Angeles in the 2013 NCAA Division I baseball season. The Bruins competed in the Pac-12 Conference, and played their home games in Jackie Robinson Stadium. John Savage served as head coach for his 9th season. The Bruins swept through the NCAA tournament's Los Angeles Regional, Fullerton Super Regional, and College World Series bracket to reach the final against Mississippi State, their second appearance in four years. The Bruins swept the Bulldogs in a best of three series to win their first NCAA National Championship in baseball, while going a perfect 10–0 in the postseason; the third consecutive NCAA Division I baseball team to sweep the postseason en route to the championship, and also the last to do so.

== Roster ==
2013 UCLA Bruins baseball team
Players
Coaches

#	Pos.	Name	B/T	Height	Weight	Year	Previous school	Home town
23	OF	Brenton Allen	L/L	6 ft 1 in (1.85 m)	225 lb (102 kg)	Jr	Gahr HS	Cerritos, CA
26	RHP	David Berg	R/R	6 ft 0 in (1.83 m)	190 lb (86 kg)	So	Bishop Amat HS	Covina, CA
3	OF	Christoph Bono	L/R	6 ft 1 in (1.85 m)	170 lb (77 kg)	RS Fr	Palo Alto HS	Palo Alto, CA
24	OF	Brian Carroll	R/R	5 ft 10 in (1.78 m)	177 lb (80 kg)	Jr	Granite Hills HS	San Diego, CA
8	INF	Trent Chatterton	R/R	5 ft 8 in (1.73 m)	170 lb (77 kg)	Fr	Pacifica HS	Garden Grove, CA
40	RHP	Ryan Deeter	R/R	6 ft 0 in (1.83 m)	180 lb (82 kg)	RS Jr	Newark Memorial HS	Newark, CA
30	RHP	Jake Ehret	R/R	6 ft 3 in (1.91 m)	207 lb (94 kg)	RS Fr	San Dimas HS	San Dimas, CA
4	OF	Eric Filia	L/R	6 ft 0 in (1.83 m)	180 lb (82 kg)	So	Edison HS	Huntington Beach, CA
48	RHP	Tucker Forbes	R/R	6 ft 9 in (2.06 m)	210 lb (95 kg)	Fr	Stevenson School	Pebble Beach, CA
27	INF	Pat Gallagher	L/R	6 ft 2 in (1.88 m)	224 lb (102 kg)	Jr	Reno HS	Reno, NV
28	C	Justin Hazard	L/R	6 ft 2 in (1.88 m)	191 lb (87 kg)	RS Fr	Beckman HS	Tustin, CA
11	RHP	James Kaprielian	R/R	6 ft 4 in (1.93 m)	195 lb (88 kg)	Fr	Beckman HS	Tustin, CA
25	INF	Chris Keck	L/R	6 ft 2 in (1.88 m)	205 lb (93 kg)	So	Amador Valley HS	Pleasanton, CA
16	RHP	Nick Kern	R/R	5 ft 11 in (1.8 m)	184 lb (83 kg)	Fr	Brea Olinda HS	Brea, CA
7	INF	Kevin Kramer	L/R	6 ft 0 in (1.83 m)	197 lb (89 kg)	So	Turlock HS	Turlock, CA
31	C	Darrell Miller, Jr.	R/R	6 ft 2 in (1.88 m)	238 lb (108 kg)	Fr	Servite HS	Yorba Linda, CA
29	OF	Ty Moore	L/R	6 ft 0 in (1.83 m)	190 lb (86 kg)	Fr	Mater Dei HS	Mission Viejo, CA
41	C	Keenan Pierandozzi-Howes	R/R	6 ft 0 in (1.83 m)	200 lb (91 kg)	Fr	Pacifica Christian HS	Santa Monica, CA
9	RHP	Adam Plutko	R/R	6 ft 3 in (1.91 m)	192 lb (87 kg)	Jr	Glendora HS	Glendora, CA
34	RHP	Cody Poteet	R/R	6 ft 1 in (1.85 m)	191 lb (87 kg)	Fr	Christian HS	Bonita, CA
35	RHP	Chase Radan	R/R	6 ft 4 in (1.93 m)	184 lb (83 kg)	Fr	Mater Dei HS	Tustin, CA
18	INF	Cody Regis	L/R	6 ft 2 in (1.88 m)	235 lb (107 kg)	Sr	Glendora HS	Glendora, CA
45	LHP	Max Schuh	L/L	6 ft 4 in (1.93 m)	205 lb (93 kg)	RS So	Edison HS	Fresno, CA
38	OF	Tyler Scott	R/R	6 ft 2 in (1.88 m)	220 lb (100 kg)	RS Fr	Marin Catholic HS	Novato, CA
1	OF	Jeff Turley	L/R	5 ft 11 in (1.8 m)	187 lb (85 kg)	Fr	Long Beach Poly HS	Long Beach, CA
44	INF	Brett Urabe	R/R	5 ft 10 in (1.78 m)	170 lb (77 kg)	Fr	Huntington Beach HS	Huntington Beach, CA
10	INF	Pat Valaika	R/R	5 ft 11 in (1.8 m)	206 lb (93 kg)	Jr	Hart HS	Valencia, CA
21	RHP	Nick Vander Tuig	R/R	6 ft 3 in (1.91 m)	195 lb (88 kg)	Jr	Oakdale HS	Oakdale, CA
33	LHP	Hunter Virant	R/L	6 ft 4 in (1.93 m)	180 lb (82 kg)	Fr	Camarillo HS	Camarillo, CA
12	LHP	Grant Watson	L/L	6 ft 0 in (1.83 m)	185 lb (84 kg)	So	Centennial HS	Bakersfield, CA
47	C	Aaron Weimer	L/R	5 ft 11 in (1.8 m)	183 lb (83 kg)	RS Jr	Bullard HS	Fresno, CA
32	RHP	Zack Weiss	R/R	6 ft 3 in (1.91 m)	210 lb (95 kg)	Jr	Northwood HS	Irvine, CA
5	INF	Kevin Williams	L/R	6 ft 0 in (1.83 m)	195 lb (88 kg)	Jr	Crespi HS	Van Nuys, CA
14	C	Shane Zeile	R/R	6 ft 1 in (1.85 m)	188 lb (85 kg)	So	Valencia HS	Valencia, CA

Head coach

John Savage

Assistant coach(es)

Rex Peters
T. J. Bruce
Jake Silverman

Legend

- (C) Team captain
- (S) Suspended
- (I) Ineligible
- Injured
- Current redshirt

Roster
Last update: June 24, 2013

== Schedule ==
2013 UCLA Bruins baseball game log
Regular season
February

Date	Opponent	Site/stadium	Score	Win	Loss	Save	Attendance	Overall record	Pac-12 record
Feb 15	Minnesota	Jackie Robinson Stadium • Los Angeles, CA	2–6 (10)	Kray (1–0)	Poteet (0–1)	None	841	0–1	
Feb 16	Minnesota	Jackie Robinson Stadium • Los Angeles, CA	14–0	Vander Tuig (1–0)	Meyer (0–1)	None	818	1–1	
Feb 17	Minnesota	Jackie Robinson Stadium • Los Angeles, CA	14–1	Watson (1–0)	Jess (0–1)	None	847	2–1	
Feb 22	@ Baylor	Baylor Ballpark • Waco, TX	4–3	Plutko (1–0)	Garner (0–2)	Kaprielian (1)	2,715	3–1	
Feb 23	@ Baylor	Baylor Ballpark • Waco, TX	0–5	Newman (1–0)	Vander Tuig (1–1)	Smith (2)	3,085	3–2	
Feb 24	@ Baylor	Baylor Ballpark • Waco, TX	5–4	Berg (1–0)	Michalec (0–1)	Kaprielian (2)	2,667	4–2	
Feb 26	@ UC Santa Barbara	Caesar Uyesaka Stadium • Santa Barbara, CA	12–3	Poteet (1–1)	Mahle (0–1)	None	425	5–2	

March

Date	Opponent	Site/stadium	Score	Win	Loss	Save	Attendance	Overall record	Pac-12 record
Mar 1	Wright State	Jackie Robinson Stadium • Los Angeles, CA	6–3	Plutko (2–0)	Henn (1–2)	Berg (1)	515	6–2	
Mar 2	Wright State	Jackie Robinson Stadium • Los Angeles, CA	4–2	Vander Tuig (2–1)	Braun (0–2)	Berg (2)	562	7–2	
Mar 3	Wright State	Jackie Robinson Stadium • Los Angeles, CA	10–2	Watson (2–0)	Sexton (1–2)	None	609	8–2	
Mar 5	@ Long Beach State	Blair Field • Long Beach, CA	3–2	Deeter (1–0)	Frye (0–1)	Berg (3)	1,322	9–2	
Mar 8	#25 Notre Dame	Jackie Robinson Stadium • Los Angeles, CA	2–1 (10)	Berg (2–0)	McCarty (2–2)	None	620	10–2	
Mar 9	#10 Oklahoma	Jackie Robinson Stadium • Los Angeles, CA	0–4	Gray (3–1)	Vander Tuig (2–2)	None	866	10–3	
Mar 10	Southern California	Jackie Robinson Stadium • Los Angeles, CA	6–1	Watson (3–0)	Adler (0–2)	None	2,157	11–3	
Mar 12	@ Cal State Northridge	Matador Field • Northridge, CA	5–4	Weiss (1–0)	Maltese (0–1)	Berg (4)	653	12–3	
Mar 16	Washington	Jackie Robinson Stadium • Los Angeles, CA	3–2 (15)	Ehret (1–0)	Kim (0–1)	None	428	13–3	1–0
Mar 16	Washington	Jackie Robinson Stadium • Los Angeles, CA	5–0	Vander Tuig (3–2)	Voth (2–3)	None	503	14–3	2–0
Mar 17	Washington	Jackie Robinson Stadium • Los Angeles, CA	3–0	Watson (4–0)	Fisher (0–1)	Berg (5)	613	15–3	3–0
Mar 22	#27 California	Jackie Robinson Stadium • Los Angeles, CA	1–5	Mason (4–0)	Plutko (2–1)	None	525	15–4	3–1
Mar 23	#27 California	Jackie Robinson Stadium • Los Angeles, CA	8–3	Vander Tuig (4–2)	Jones (1–2)	None	740	16–4	4–1
Mar 24	#27 California	Jackie Robinson Stadium • Los Angeles, CA	10–2	Watson (5–0)	Nelson (0–1)	None	974	17–4	5–1
Mar 28	@ Arizona State	Packard Stadium • Tempe, AZ	1–4	Williams (4–2)	Plutko (2–2)	Burr (4)	3,501	17–5	5–2
Mar 29	@ Arizona State	Packard Stadium • Tempe, AZ	4–7	Kellogg (6–0)	Poteet (1–2)	Burr (5)	3,561	17–6	5–3
Mar 30	@ Arizona State	Packard Stadium • Tempe, AZ	12–10 (10)	Berg (3–0)	Mebostad (0–1)	None	2,870	18–6	6–3

April

Date	Opponent	Site/stadium	Score	Win	Loss	Save	Attendance	Overall record	Pac-12 record
Apr 2	#5 Cal State Fullerton	Jackie Robinson Stadium • Los Angeles, CA	6–9	Peitzmeier (2–0)	Poteet (1–3)	Lorenzen (9)	723	18–7	
Apr 5	#6 Oregon State	Jackie Robinson Stadium • Los Angeles, CA	3–2	Plutko (3–2)	Boyd (6–1)	Berg (6)	847	19–7	7–3
Apr 6	#6 Oregon State	Jackie Robinson Stadium • Los Angeles, CA	0–5	Moore (6–1)	Vander Tuig (4–3)	None	1,001	19–8	7–4
Apr 7	#6 Oregon State	Jackie Robinson Stadium • Los Angeles, CA	2–5	Wetzler (1–1)	Watson (5–1)	Schultz (7)	1,057	19–9	7–5
Apr 9	Hawaii	Jackie Robinson Stadium • Los Angeles, CA	5–1	Poteet (2–3)	Squier (0–5)	None	465	20–9	
Apr 12	Loyola Marymount	Jackie Robinson Stadium • Los Angeles, CA	2–0	Plutko (4–2)	Welmon (5–2)	Berg (7)	510	21–9	
Apr 13	Loyola Marymount	Jackie Robinson Stadium • Los Angeles, CA	3–1	Vender Tuig (5–3)	Griffin (3–4)	Berg (8)	592	22–9	
Apr 14	Loyola Marymount	Jackie Robinson Stadium • Los Angeles, CA	1–4	McGrath (2–1)	Watson (5–2)	Dahlson (4)	714	22–10	
Apr 16	@ UC Irvine	Cicerone Field • Irvine, CA	6–4 (12)	Berg (4–0)	Parmenter (1–2)	None	1,041	23–10	
Apr 19	@ #7 Oregon	PK Park • Eugene, OR	1–0	Plutko (5–2)	Thorpe (5–4)	Berg (9)	1,917	24–10	8–5
Apr 20	@ #7 Oregon	PK Park • Eugene, OR	1–0	Vander Tuig (6–3)	Irvin (7–2)	Berg (10)	3,181	25–10	9–5
Apr 21	@ #7 Oregon	PK Park • Eugene, OR	3–5	Reed (5–3)	Watson (5–3)	Sherfy (13)	2,137	25–11	9–6
Apr 23	Long Beach State	Jackie Robinson Stadium • Los Angeles, CA	1–11	Sabo (2–2)	Poteet (2–4)	None	459	25–12	
Apr 26	@ Washington State	Bailey–Brayton Field • Pullman, WA	7–6 (11)	Berg (5–0)	Monda (2–1)	None	873	26–12	10–6
Apr 27	@ Washington State	Bailey–Brayton Field • Pullman, WA	10–1	Vander Tuig (7–3)	Chelborad (3–7)	None	1,117	27–12	11–6
Apr 28	@ Washington State	Bailey–Brayton Field • Pullman, WA	3–4	Leckenby (1–2)	Weiss (1–1)	Monda (1)	781	27–13	11–7
Apr 30	UC Irvine	Jackie Robinson Stadium • Los Angeles, CA	8–1	Poteet (3–4)	Brock (1–1)	None	459	28–13	

May

Date	Opponent	Site/stadium	Score	Win	Loss	Save	Attendance	Overall record	Pac-12 record
May 3	Utah	Jackie Robinson Stadium • Los Angeles, CA	5–2	Plutko (6–2)	Watrous (3–3)	Berg (11)	613	29–13	12–7
May 4	Utah	Jackie Robinson Stadium • Los Angeles, CA	5–4	Vander Tuig (8–3)	Carroll (3–6)	Berg (12)	733	30–13	13–7
May 5	Utah	Jackie Robinson Stadium • Los Angeles, CA	4–3	Berg (6–0)	Green (0–1)	None	872	31–13	14–7
May 7	Cal State Northridge	Jackie Robinson Stadium • Los Angeles, CA	1–4	Sandoval (2–0)	Poteet (3–5)	Gossen-Brown (9)	489	31–14	
May 10	Arizona	Jackie Robinson Stadium • Los Angeles, CA	10–2	Plutko (7–2)	Farris (4–5)	None	844	32–14	15–7
May 11	Arizona	Jackie Robinson Stadium • Los Angeles, CA	7–1	Vander Tuig (9–3)	Wade (4–6)	Berg (13)	1,016	33–14	16–7
May 12	Arizona	Jackie Robinson Stadium • Los Angeles, CA	12–5	Deeter (2–0)	Crawford (5–2)	None	809	34–14	17–7
May 14	@ #5 Cal State Fullerton	Goodwin Field • Fullerton, CA	2–5	Birosak (1–0)	Poteet (3–6)	Lorenzen (16)	2,738	34–15	
May 17	@ Southern California	Dedeaux Field • Los Angeles, CA	2–1	Weiss (2–1)	Wheatley (1–3)	Berg (14)	796	35–15	18–7
May 18	@ Southern California	Dedeaux Field • Los Angeles, CA	7–6	Vander Tuig (10–3)	Nootbaar (2–5)	Berg (15)	871	36–15	19–7
May 19	@ Southern California	Dedeaux Field • Los Angeles, CA	5–2	Watson (6–3)	Twomey (2–7)	Berg (16)	1,106	37–15	20–7
May 21	UC Santa Barbara	Jackie Robinson Stadium • Los Angeles, CA	2–1	Poteet (4–6)	Jacome (5–4)	Berg (17)	653	38–15	
May 24	@ Stanford	Klein Field at Sunken Diamond • Stanford, CA	1–2	Appel (10–4)	Plutko (7–3)	Hughes (4)	2,121	38–16	20–8
May 25	@ Stanford	Klein Field at Sunken Diamond • Stanford, CA	3–7	James (3–3)	Vander Tuig (10–4)	Lindquist (5)	1,792	38–17	20–9
May 26	@ Stanford	Klein Field at Sunken Diamond • Stanford, CA	6–4	Watson (7–3)	McArdle (3–3)	Berg (18)	2,679	39–17	21–9

Postseason
NCAA Los Angeles Regional

Date	Opponent	Site/stadium	Score	Win	Loss	Save	Attendance	Overall record	NCAAT record
May 31	(4) San Diego State	Jackie Robinson Stadium • Los Angeles, CA	5–3	Plutko (8–3)	Ryan Doran (8–4)	Berg (19)	1,690	40–17	1–0
June 1	(2) Cal Poly	Jackie Robinson Stadium • Los Angeles, CA	6–4	Vander Tuig (11–4)	Reed Reilly (2–4)	Berg (20)	1,749	41–17	2–0
June 1	(3) San Diego	Jackie Robinson Stadium • Los Angeles, CA	6–0	Watson (8–3)	Max Homick (5–2)	None	1,220	42–17	3–0

NCAA Fullerton Super Regional

Date	Opponent	Site/stadium	Score	Win	Loss	Save	Attendance	Overall record	NCAAT record
June 6	#5 Cal State Fullerton	Goodwin Field • Fullerton, CA	5–3 (10)	Berg (7–0)	J. D. Davis (1–2)	None	3,244	43–17	4–0
June 7	#5 Cal State Fullerton	Goodwin Field • Fullerton, CA	3–0	Vander Tuig (12–4)	Thomas Eshelman (12–3)	Berg (21)	3,303	44–17	5–0

College World Series

Date	Opponent	Site/stadium	Score	Win	Loss	Save	Attendance	Overall record	CWS record
June 16	LSU	TD Ameritrade Park • Omaha, NE	2–1	Plutko (9–3)	Nola (12–1)	Berg (22)	26,344	45–17	1–0
June 18	NC State	TD Ameritrade Park • Omaha, NE	2–1	Vander Tuig (13–4)	Jernigan (1–1)	Berg (23)	25,543	46–17	2–0
June 21	#1 North Carolina	TD Ameritrade Park • Omaha, NE	4–1	Watson (9–3)	Emanuel (11–5)	None	25,947	47–17	3–0
June 24	Mississippi State	TD Ameritrade Park • Omaha, NE	3–1	Plutko (10–3)	Fitts (0–1)	Berg (24)	25,690	48–17	4–0
June 25	Mississippi State	TD Ameritrade Park • Omaha, NE	8–0	Vander Tuig (14–4)	Pollorena (6–4)	None	27,127	49–17	5–0

== Ranking movements ==
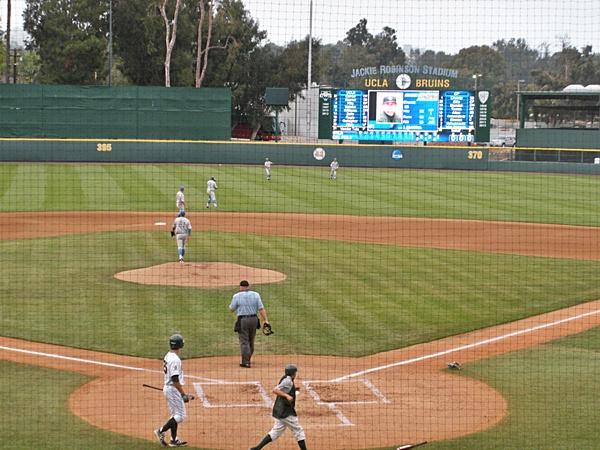
UCLA Bruins playing at the L.A. Regional at Jackie Robinson Stadium on June 1, 2013

Ranking movements Legend: ██ Increase in ranking ██ Decrease in ranking
	Week																		
Poll	Pre	1	2	3	4	5	6	7	8	9	10	11	12	13	14	15	16	17	Final
Coaches'	2	2*	11	9	7	7	7	10	13	11	8	11	10	10	11	10			
Baseball America	12	12	12	12	11	11	7	10	17	13	9	9	8	8	8	10	10	10	1
Collegiate Baseball^	5	6	12	13	10	9	8	13	15	11	7	12	11	11	11	11			
NCBWA†	5	6	9	7	7	7	6	11	15	12	8	12	11	11	11	11			

^ Collegiate Baseball ranked 40 teams in their preseason poll, but only ranked 30 teams weekly during the season.
† NCBWA ranks 30 teams in their preseason poll, but only ranks 25 teams weekly during the season.
* A new poll was not released for this week, so for comparison purposes, the previous week's ranking is inserted in this week's slot.

== UCLA Bruins in the 2013 MLB draft ==
The following members of the UCLA Bruins baseball program were drafted in the 2013 Major League Baseball draft.

Player	Position	Round	Overall	MLB team
Nick Vander Tuig	Pitcher	6th	192	San Francisco Giants
Zack Weiss	Pitcher	6th	195	Cincinnati Reds
Pat Valaika	Shortstop	9th	259	Colorado Rockies
Adam Plutko	Pitcher	11th	321	Cleveland Indians
Brenton Allen	Outfielder	20th	616	Washington Nationals
Kevin Williams	Infielder	29th	862	Miami Marlins
Ryan Deeter	Pitcher	32nd	962	Milwaukee Brewers

== Notes ==
- UCLA is making a back-to-back trip to the College World Series, the third time in the last four years
- The Bruins defeated Cal Poly, San Diego, and San Diego State in the Los Angeles Regional
- UCLA defeated No. 5 nationally seeded Cal State Fullerton (5–3, 3–0) in the Fullerton Super Regional
- The Bruins defeated No. 4 seeded LSU (2–1), NC State (2–1) and No. 1 seeded North Carolina (4–1) to advance to the Championship series; UCLA is the only undefeated team (8–0) in the tournament
- The pitching orders have been Adam Plutko, Nick Vander Tuig, Grant Watson and the relievers are James Kaprielian, Zack Weiss, and David Berg (this order)
- David Berg is the Pac-12 Conference Baseball Pitcher of the Year and the NCBWA Stopper of the Year
- Shortstop Pat Valaika is the Pac-12 Conference Defensive Player of the Year
- David Berg and Pat Valaika are named to the American Baseball Coaches Association (ABCA) All-West Region team
- David Berg set a new NCAA record with his 24th save of the year on June 24, 2013
- Berg made his 51st appearance of the season, becoming the first pitcher in NCAA history to record 50 or more appearances in multiple seasons
- The Bruins won the school's 109th NCAA National Championship
- Adam Plutko was named the College World Series Most Outstanding Player
- All-Tournament Team from UCLA: Pat Valaika (SS), Eric Filia (OF), Adam Plutko (P), Nick Vander Tuig (P)
- The championship banner was unveiled at the Championship Celebration at Jackie Robinson Stadium on June 27, 2013
- Head coach John Savage is named the National Coach of the Year by Collegiate Baseball Newspaper and Baseball America, and the ABCA West Region Coach of the Year
