= 2013 NCAA Division I baseball tournament =

American college baseball championship

- Season: 2013
- Teams: 64
- Finals site: TD Ameritrade Park; Omaha, NE
- Champions: UCLA (1st title)
- Runner-up: Mississippi State (9th CWS Appearance)
- Winning coach: John Savage (1st title)
- MOP: Adam Plutko (UCLA)
- Attendance: 27,127
- Television: ESPN Networks

The 2013 NCAA Division I baseball tournament began on Friday, May 31, 2013, as part of the 2013 NCAA Division I baseball season. The 64 team double elimination tournament concluded with the 2013 College World Series in Omaha, Nebraska, which began on June 15 and ended with the final round on June 25. The UCLA Bruins swept the Mississippi State Bulldogs in a best-of-three series to win the NCAA National Championship, the university's first in baseball and the 109th national title in all sports.

The 64 participating college baseball teams were selected from an eligible pool of 298 NCAA Division I programs. Thirty teams were awarded an automatic bid as champions of their individual conferences. Additionally, 34 non-automatic qualifying teams were awarded at-large berths by the NCAA Division I Baseball Committee.

The 64 teams were divided into sixteen regionals consisting of four teams each. All four teams, in each regional, competed in a double-elimination tournament. Regional champions then faced one another in a best-of-three games series in their individual Super Regional based upon a predetermined bracketed system. This format determined the final eight participants to advance to the College World Series in Omaha, Nebraska.

Fourteen of the sixteen original Regional hosts advanced to their respective Super Regional; the exceptions were the #8 national seed Oregon Ducks and the Virginia Tech Hokies.

For the first time in television history, ESPN provided live cut-ins and highlights from all 16 Regionals with the new Bases Loaded platform — similar to ESPN Goal Line and Buzzer Beater for college football and basketball.

== Bids ==
=== Automatic bids ===
School	Conference	Record (Conf)	Berth	Last NCAA appearance
Binghamton	America East	30–23 (16–13)	Tournament	2009 (Greenville Regional)
North Carolina	ACC	52–8 (21–7)	Tournament	2012 (Chapel Hill Regional)
East Tennessee State	Atlantic Sun	36–22 (17–10)	Tournament	1981 (Atlantic Regional)
Saint Louis	Atlantic 10	41–18 (17–7)	Tournament	2010 (Louisville Regional)
Oklahoma	Big 12	40–19 (13–11)	Tournament	2012 (Columbia Super Regional)
Connecticut	Big East	34–26 (9–15)	Tournament	2011 (Columbia Super Regional)
Liberty	Big South	29–26 (13–11)	Tournament	2000 (Columbia Regional)
Indiana	Big Ten	40–13 (17–7)	Tournament	2009 (Louisville Regional)
Cal State Fullerton	Big West	48–8 (23–4)	Regular season	2012 (Eugene Regional)
Towson	Colonial	29–28 (14–13)	Tournament	1991 (Northeast Regional)
Rice	Conference USA	41-17(15–9)	Tournament	2012 (Houston Regional)
Valparaiso	Horizon	31–26 (13–11)	Tournament	2012 (Gary Regional)
Columbia	Ivy League	26–19 (16–4)	Championship series	2008 (Conway Regional)
Canisius	Metro Atlantic	39–15 (13–9)	Tournament	First appearance
Bowling Green	Mid-American	24–28 (13–14)	Tournament	1999 (Columbus Regional)
Savannah State	Mid-Eastern	30–22 (17–7)	Tournament	First appearance
Wichita State	Missouri Valley	34–25 (15–6)	Tournament	2009 (Norman Regional)
San Diego State	Mountain West	26–28 (15–15)	Tournament	2009 (Irvine Regional)
Bryant	Northeast	40-15-1 (27–5)	Tournament	First appearance
Austin Peay State	Ohio Valley	42–13 (22–7)	Tournament	2012 (Eugene Regional)
Oregon State	Pac-12	45–10 (24–6)	Regular season	2012 (Baton Rouge Regional)
Army	Patriot	29–21 (11–9)	Tournament	2012 (Charlottesville Regional)
LSU	Southeastern	52–9 (23–7)	Tournament	2012 (Baton Rouge Super Regional)
Elon	Southern	28–28 (18–11)	Tournament	2012 (Cary Regional)
Central Arkansas	Southland	34–19 (12–15)	Tournament	First appearance
Jackson State	Southwestern Athletic	34–20 (19–5)	Tournament	2000 (Baton Rouge Regional)
South Dakota State	Summit	31–22 (16–10)	Tournament	First appearance
Florida Atlantic	Sun Belt	36–20 (19–11)	Tournament	2010 (Gainesville Regional)
San Diego	West Coast	34–23 (15–9)	Tournament	2012 (Los Angeles Regional)
UTSA	Western Athletic	33–22 (15–11)	Tournament	2005 (Central Regional)

=== By conference ===
Conference	Total	Schools
SEC	9	Alabama, Arkansas, Florida, LSU, Mississippi State, Ole Miss, South Carolina, Texas A&M, Vanderbilt
ACC	8	Clemson, Florida State, Georgia Tech, Miami, North Carolina, NC State, Virginia, Virginia Tech
Pac-12	4	Arizona State, Oregon, Oregon State, UCLA
Sun Belt	4	Florida Atlantic, Louisiana–Lafayette, South Alabama, Troy
Big 12	3	Kansas State, Oklahoma, Oklahoma State
Big West	3	Cal Poly, Cal State Fullerton, UC Santa Barbara
Colonial	3	Towson, UNC Wilmington, William & Mary
Atlantic Sun	2	East Tennessee State, Mercer
Big East	2	Connecticut, Louisville
Big South	2	Coastal Carolina, Liberty
Big Ten	2	Illinois, Indiana
Mountain West	2	New Mexico, San Diego State
Southland	2	Central Arkansas, Sam Houston State
West Coast	2	San Diego, San Francisco
America East	1	Binghamton
Atlantic 10	1	Saint Louis
Conference USA	1	Rice
Horizon	1	Valparaiso
Ivy	1	Columbia
MAAC	1	Canisius
Mid-American	1	Bowling Green
MEAC	1	Savannah State
Missouri Valley	1	Wichita State
NEC	1	Bryant
Ohio Valley	1	Austin Peay State
Patriot	1	Army
Southern	1	Elon
SWAC	1	Jackson State
Summit	1	South Dakota State
WAC	1	UTSA

== National seeds ==
These eight teams automatically host a Super Regional if they advance to that round. Oregon was the only team not to advance to the Super Regional.
Bold indicates CWS participant.

1. **North Carolina**
2. Vanderbilt
3. **Oregon State**
4. **LSU**
5. Cal State Fullerton
6. Virginia
7. Florida State
8. Oregon

== Regionals and Super Regionals ==
Bold indicates winner. * indicates extra innings.

=== Chapel Hill Super Regional ===
Regional	Regional
1	**North Carolina**	**6**
4	Canisius	3
1	**North Carolina**	**8**
3	Towson	5
3	**Towson**	**7**
2	Florida Atlantic	2
Chapel Hill Regional – Boshamer Stadium
4	Canisius	6
2	**Florida Atlantic**	**14**
2	**Florida Atlantic**	**6**
3	Towson	5
1	**South Carolina**	**7**
4	Saint Louis	3
1	**South Carolina**	**19**
3	Liberty	3
3	**Liberty**	**8**
2	Clemson	3
Columbia Regional – Carolina Stadium
4	Saint Louis	2
2	**Clemson**	**10**
2	Clemson	1
3	**Liberty**	**3**

Regional Final
1	**North Carolina**	2	**12**^{13}
2	Florida Atlantic	**3**	11
1	**South Carolina**	**6**	-
3	Liberty	4	-

Super Regional
1	**North Carolina**	**6**	0	**5**
South Carolina	5	**8**	4

=== Raleigh Super Regional ===
Regional	Regional
1	**Oregon**	**3**
4	South Dakota State	2
1	Oregon	0
2	**Rice**	**1**
3	San Francisco	2
2	**Rice**	**3**^{11}
Eugene Regional – PK Park
4	South Dakota State	3
3	**San Francisco**	**4**^{13}
3	San Francisco	1
1	**Oregon**	**6**
1	**NC State**	**4**
4	Binghamton	1
1	**NC State**	**1**
3	William & Mary	0
3	**William & Mary**	**4**
2	Ole Miss	2
Raleigh Regional – Doak Field
4	Binghamton	4
2	**Ole Miss**	**8**
2	Ole Miss	1
3	**William & Mary**	**4**

Regional Final
2	**Rice**	0	**11**
1	Oregon	**11**	4
1	**NC State**	**9**	-
3	William & Mary	2	-

Super Regional
Rice	3	4	-
**NC State**	**4**	**5**^{17}	-

=== Fullerton Super Regional ===
Regional	Regional
1	**Cal State Fullerton**	**4**
4	Columbia	1
1	**Cal State Fullerton**	**1**
2	Arizona State	0
3	New Mexico	3
2	**Arizona State**	**4**
Fullerton Regional – Goodwin Field
4	**Columbia**	**6**^{13}
3	New Mexico	5
4	Columbia	5
2	**Arizona State**	**10**
1	**UCLA**	**5**
4	San Diego State	3
1	**UCLA**	**6**
2	Cal Poly	4
3	San Diego	2
2	**Cal Poly**	**9**
Los Angeles Regional – Jackie Robinson Stadium
4	San Diego State	3
3	**San Diego**	**6**
3	**San Diego**	**8**
2	Cal Poly	5

Regional Final
1	**Cal State Fullerton**	**6**	-
2	Arizona State	1	-
1	**UCLA**	**6**	-
3	San Diego	0	-

Super Regional
5	Cal State Fullerton	3	0	-
**UCLA**	**5**^{10}	**3**	-

=== Baton Rouge Super Regional ===
Regional	Regional
1	**LSU**	**11**
4	Jackson State	7
1	**LSU**	**8**
3	Sam Houston State	5
3	**Sam Houston State**	**4**
2	Louisiana–Lafayette	2
Baton Rouge Regional - Alex Box Stadium
4	Jackson State	1
2	**Louisiana–Lafayette**	**15**
2	**Louisiana–Lafayette**	**7**
3	Sam Houston State	5
1	Virginia Tech	2
4	**Connecticut**	**5**
4	Connecticut	3*
2	**Oklahoma**	**5***
3	Coastal Carolina	3
2	**Oklahoma**	**7**
Blacksburg Regional - English Field
1	**Virginia Tech**	**9**
3	Coastal Carolina	1
1	**Virginia Tech**	**3**
4	Connecticut	1

Regional Final
1	**LSU**	**5**	-
2	Louisiana–Lafayette	1	-
2	**Oklahoma**	**10**	-
1	Virginia Tech	4	-

Super Regional
4	**LSU**	**2**	**11**	-
Oklahoma	0	1	-

=== Corvallis Super Regional ===
Regional	Regional
1	**Oregon State**	**5**
4	UTSA	4
1	**Oregon State**	**3**
3	UC Santa Barbara	2
3	**UC Santa Barbara**	**6**
2	Texas A&M	4
Corvallis Regional - Goss Stadium at Coleman Field
4	UTSA	1
2	**Texas A&M**	**6**
2	**Texas A&M**	**5**
3	UC Santa Barbara	4
1	**Kansas State**	**20**
4	Wichita State	11
1	**Kansas State**	**7**
3	Bryant	1
3	**Bryant**	**4**
2	Arkansas	1
Manhattan Regional - Tointon Family Stadium
4	Wichita State	1
2	**Arkansas**	**3**
2	**Arkansas**	**12**
3	Bryant	3

Regional Final
1	**Oregon State**	**6**	-
2	Texas A&M	1	-
1	**Kansas State**	**4**	-
2	Arkansas	3	-

Super Regional
3	**Oregon State**	2	**12**	**4**
Kansas State	**6**^{10}	4	3

=== Charlottesville Super Regional ===
Regional	Regional
1	**Virginia**	**2**
4	Army	1
1	**Virginia**	**2**
3	Elon	0
3	**Elon**	**10**
2	UNC Wilmington	7
Charlottesville Regional - Davenport Field
4	Army	5
2	**UNC Wilmington**	**9**
2	UNC Wilmington	4
3	**Elon**	**6**
1	**Mississippi State**	**5**
4	Central Arkansas	3
1	**Mississippi State**	**6**
2	South Alabama	2
3	Mercer	4
2	**South Alabama**	**9**
Starkville Regional - Dudy Noble Field
4	**Central Arkansas**	**6**^{11}
3	Mercer	5
4	**Central Arkansas**	**3**
2	South Alabama	0

Regional Finals
1	**Virginia**	**11**	-
3	Elon	3	-
1	**Mississippi State**	2	**6**
4	Central Arkansas	**5**	1

Super Regional
6	Virginia	6	5	-
**Mississippi State**	**11**	**6**	-

=== Tallahassee Super Regional ===
Regional	Regional
1	**Florida State**	**10**
4	Savannah State	0
1	**Florida State**	**11**
3	Troy	0
3	**Troy**	**5**
2	Alabama	2
Tallahassee Regional - Dick Howser Stadium
4	Savannah State	2
2	**Alabama**	**3**
2	Alabama	8
3	**Troy**	**9**
1	**Indiana**	**5**
4	Valparaiso	4
1	**Indiana**	**15**
2	Austin Peay State	6
3	Florida	3
2	**Austin Peay State**	**4**
Bloomington Regional - Bart Kaufman Field
4	**Valparaiso**	**5**
3	Florida	4
4	Valparaiso	4
2	**Austin Peay State**	**5**

Regional Final
1	**Florida State**	**11**	-
3	Troy	4	-
1	**Indiana**	**6**	-
2	Austin Peay State	1	-

Super Regional
7	Florida State	9	6	-
**Indiana**	**10**	**11**	-

=== Nashville Super Regional ===
Regional	Regional
1	**Vanderbilt**	**9**
4	East Tennessee State	1
1	**Vanderbilt**	**10**
3	Illinois	4
3	**Illinois**	**6**
2	Georgia Tech	4
Nashville Regional - Hawkins Field
4	East Tennessee State	1
2	**Georgia Tech**	**5**
2	**Georgia Tech**	**6**
3	Illinois	3
1	**Louisville**	**8**
4	Bowling Green	3
1	**Louisville**	**6**
2	Miami (FL)	4
3	Oklahoma State	0
2	**Miami (FL)**	**7**
Louisville Regional - Jim Patterson Stadium
4	Bowling Green	3
3	**Oklahoma State**	**7**
3	**Oklahoma State**	**7**
2	Miami (FL)	1

Regional Final
1	**Vanderbilt**	0	**7**
2	Georgia Tech	**5**	1
1	**Louisville**	**12**	-
3	Oklahoma State	3	-

Super Regional
2	Vanderbilt	3	1	-
**Louisville**	**5**	**2**	-

== College World Series ==
The College World Series began on June 15, 2013, and was held at TD Ameritrade Park in Omaha, Nebraska.

=== Participants ===
School	Conference	Record (conference)	Head coach	Previous CWS Appearances	Best CWS Finish	CWS record Not including this year
Indiana	Big Ten	48–14 (17–7)	Tracy Smith	none	none	0–0
Louisville	Big East	51–12 (20–4)	Dan McDonnell	1 (last: 2007)	5th (2007)	1–2
LSU	SEC	57–9 (23–7)	Paul Mainieri	15 (last: 2009)	1st (1991, 1993, 1996, 1997, 2000, 2009)	35–20
Mississippi State	SEC	48–18 (16–14)	John Cohen	8 (last: 2007)	3rd (1985)	7–16
North Carolina	ACC	57–10 (21–7)	Mike Fox	9 (last: 2011)	2nd (2006, 2007)	15–19
NC State	ACC	49–14 (19–10)	Elliott Avent	1 (last: 1968)	3rd (1968)	2–2
Oregon State	Pac-12	50–11 (24–6)	Pat Casey	4 (last: 2007)	1st (2006, 2007)	11–6
UCLA	Pac-12	44–17 (21–9)	John Savage	4 (last: 2012)	2nd (2010)	4–9

=== Bracket ===
Seeds listed below indicate national seeds only.

All times Eastern.

First round
1	North Carolina	1
**NC State**	**8**
**UCLA**	**2**
4	LSU	1
1	**North Carolina**	**4**
4	LSU	2
3	Oregon State	4
**Mississippi State**	**5**
**Indiana**	**2**
Louisville	0
3	**Oregon State**	**11**
Louisville	4

Second round
NC State	1
**UCLA**	**2**
1	**North Carolina**	**7**
NC State	0
**Mississippi State**	**5**
Indiana	4
3	**Oregon State**	**1**
Indiana	0

Semi-finals
**UCLA**	**4**	-
1	North Carolina	1	-
**Mississippi State**	**4**	-
3	Oregon State	1	-

Finals
**UCLA**	**3**	**8**	-
Mississippi State	1	0	-

=== Championship Series ===
==== Game 1 ====
Monday, June 24 7:00 pm Omaha, Nebraska ESPN
Team	1	2	3	4	5	6	7	8	9	R	H	E
**UCLA**	1	0	0	2	0	0	0	0	0	**3**	**6**	**1**
Mississippi State	0	0	0	1	0	0	0	0	0	**1**	**6**	**1**
Starting pitchers: UCLA: Adam Plutko; MSU: Trevor Fitts; WP: Adam Plutko LP: Trevor Fitts Sv: David Berg; Home runs: UCLA: None; MSU: None; Attendance: 25,690; Boxscore

==== Game 2 ====
Tuesday, June 25 7:00 pm Omaha, Nebraska ESPN
Team	1	2	3	4	5	6	7	8	9	R	H	E
Mississippi State	0	0	0	0	0	0	0	0	0	**0**	**5**	**3**
**UCLA**	1	0	2	2	0	1	0	2	X	**8**	**12**	**1**
Starting pitchers: MSU: Luis Pollorena; UCLA: Nick Vander Tuig; WP: Nick Vander Tuig LP: Luis Pollorena; Home runs: MSU: None; UCLA: None; Attendance: 27,127; Boxscore

=== All-Tournament Team ===
The following players were members of the College World Series All-Tournament Team.

Position	Player	School
P	**Adam Plutko (MOP)**	UCLA
P	Nick Vander Tuig	UCLA
C	Brian Holberton	North Carolina
1B	Wes Rea	Mississippi State
2B	Brett Pirtle	Mississippi State
3B	Colin Moran	North Carolina
SS	Pat Valaika	UCLA
OF	Michael Conforto	Oregon State
OF	Eric Filia	UCLA
OF	Hunter Renfroe	Mississippi State
DH	Trey Porter	Mississippi State

== Final standings ==
Seeds listed below indicate national seeds only

Place	School	Record
1st	UCLA	10–0
2nd	Mississippi State	8–3
3rd	#1 North Carolina	7–4
3rd	#3 Oregon State	7–3
5th	Indiana	6–2
5th	NC State	6–2
7th	Louisville	5–2
7th	#4 LSU	5–2
9th	#5 Cal State Fullerton	3–2
9th	#7 Florida State	3–2
9th	Kansas State	4–2
9th	Oklahoma	3–2
9th	Rice	3–3
9th	South Carolina	4–2
9th	#2 Vanderbilt	3–3
9th	#6 Virginia	3–2
17th	Arizona State	2–2
17th	Arkansas	2–2
17th	Austin Peay State	2–2
17th	Central Arkansas	3–2
17th	Elon	2–2
17th	Florida Atlantic	3–2
17th	Georgia Tech	3–2
17th	Liberty	2–2
17th	Louisiana–Lafayette	2–2
17th	Oklahoma State	2–2
17th	#8 Oregon	3–2
17th	San Diego	2–2
17th	Texas A&M	2–2
17th	Troy	2–2
17th	Virginia Tech	2–2
17th	William & Mary	2–2
33rd	Alabama	1–2
33rd	Bryant	1–2
33rd	Cal Poly	1–2
33rd	Clemson	1–2
33rd	Columbia	1–2
33rd	Connecticut	1–2
33rd	Illinois	1–2
33rd	Miami (FL)	1–2
33rd	Ole Miss	1–2
33rd	Sam Houston State	1–2
33rd	San Francisco	1–2
33rd	South Alabama	1–2
33rd	Towson	1–2
33rd	UC Santa Barbara	1–2
33rd	UNC Wilmington	1–2
33rd	Valparaiso	1–2
49th	Army	0–2
49th	Binghamton	0–2
49th	Bowling Green	0–2
49th	Canisius	0–2
49th	Coastal Carolina	0–2
49th	East Tennessee State	0–2
49th	Florida	0–2
49th	Jackson State	0–2
49th	Mercer	0–2
49th	New Mexico	0–2
49th	Saint Louis	0–2
49th	San Diego State	0–2
49th	Savannah State	0–2
49th	South Dakota State	0–2
49th	UTSA	0–2
49th	Wichita State	0–2

== Record by conference ==
Conference	# of Bids	Record	Win %	RF	SR	WS	NS	CS	NC
Pac-12	4	22–7	.759	4	2	2	2	1	1
Southeastern	9	26–20	.565	6	4	2	1	1	–
Atlantic Coast	8	26–18	.591	6	4	2	1	–	–
Big Ten	2	7–4	.636	1	1	1	–	–	–
Big East	2	6–4	.600	1	1	1	–	–	–
Big 12	3	9–6	.600	3	2	–	–	–	–
Big West	3	5–6	.455	1	1	–	–	–	–
Conf USA	1	3–3	.500	1	1	–	–	–	–
Sun Belt	4	8–8	.500	3	–	–	–	–	–
Colonial	3	4–6	.400	1	–	–	–	–	–
Southland	2	4–4	.500	1	–	–	–	–	–
West Coast	2	3–4	.429	1	–	–	–	–	–
Big South	2	2–4	.333	1	–	–	–	–	–
Atlantic Sun	2	0–4	.000	–	–	–	–	–	–
Mountain West	2	0–4	.000	–	–	–	–	–	–
Other	15	7–30	.189	2	–	–	–	–	–

The columns RF, SR, WS, NS, CS, and NC respectively stand for the Regional Finals, Super Regionals, College World Series, National Semifinals, Championship Series, and National Champion.

== Tournament notes ==
=== Round 1 ===
- Virginia Tech was the only #1 seed to be upset by a #4 seed (Connecticut) in its opening game.
- Cal Poly and William & Mary recorded their first-ever NCAA tournament wins.
- #3 seeds went 9–7 against #2 seeds in their opening games.

=== Round 2 ===
- After 2 rounds, 14 of the 16 #1 seeds were 2–0 (Virginia Tech & Oregon were 1–1 and knocked into the losers bracket).
- Three #4 seeds won elimination games on the 2nd day of the tournament: Central Arkansas, Columbia and Valparaiso.

=== Regional Finals ===
- Virginia Tech & Oregon were the only #1 seeds not advancing to the Super Regionals.
- Central Arkansas was the only #4 seed to reach a regional final (Starkville).
- All 4 teams which came from the losers' bracket and won to force an extra game, lost the 2nd game and failed to advance.

=== Super Regionals ===
- Game 2 between NC State and Rice went 17 innings, making it the fourth longest game in NCAA tournament history and the longest ever in the Super Regional round, which dates to 1999.

=== College World Series ===
- Indiana is the first Big Ten team to participate in the College World Series since 1984 (Michigan).
- With Mississippi State's win over Oregon State in the semifinals, it marks the sixth consecutive College World Series in which the Southeastern Conference has fielded a conference member in the finals.
- No top 8 national seed reached the CWS Finals for the first time since 2006. In the last four years, UCLA has made two appearances in the Finals and a Pac-12 Conference team has played in the Championship series three times.
- The Finals featured an SEC team against a Pac-10/12 team for the third time in four years. South Carolina defeated UCLA in 2010, and Arizona defeated South Carolina in 2012. Before 2010, teams from those conferences had met in the finals just once (2000).
- David Berg of UCLA set a new NCAA single-season record with his 24th save on June 24, 2013. and made his 51st appearance of the season, becoming the first pitcher in NCAA history to record 50 or more appearances in multiple seasons.
- UCLA won its first NCAA baseball Championship, becoming the third team to win the Championship with a perfect 10–0 record, the first team to allow no more than one run in each game of the series, and the fourth straight team to sweep the CWS Finals.
- All-Tournament Team: Brian Holberton (C), NC; Wes Rea (1B), MSU.; Brett Pirtle (2B), MSU; Colin Moran (3B) NC; Pat Valaika (SS), UCLA; Michael Conforto (OF), OSU; Eric Filia (OF), UCLA; Hunter Renfroe (OF), MSU; Trey Porter (DH), MSU; Adam Plutko (P), UCLA (also the Most Outstanding Player); Nick Vander Tuig (P), UCLA.
- With the 8–0 shutout loss in game two of the finals, Mississippi State becomes the first team in twenty years to be held scoreless in the CWS finals, (Wichita State lost 8–0 to LSU in 1993), and only the sixth team in CWS history to be held scoreless in the finals.
- UCLA tied the Santa Clara CWS record for number of sacrifice bunts at 12, set in 1962.
- New attendance record was set on June 25 at 27,127.

== Media coverage ==
=== Radio ===
NRG Media, in conjunction with Westwood One/NCAA Radio Network, provided nationwide radio coverage of the College World Series, which was streamed online at dialglobalsports.com and broadcast across radio stations throughout the US. Kevin Kugler and John Bishop called all games leading up to the Championship Series. The championship series was called by Kugler and Scott Graham with Ted Emrich acting as field reporter for the first time.

=== Television ===
For the first time ever ESPN carried every game from the Regionals, Super Regionals, and College World Series across the ESPN Networks (ESPN, ESPN2, ESPNU, and ESPN3). ESPN also provided Bases Loaded coverage for the Regionals. Bases Loaded was hosted by Dari Nowkhah and Anish Shroff with Kyle Peterson on hand as analysts. Bases Loaded aired the entire time on ESPN3 with select coverage on ESPN2 and ESPNU.

==== Broadcast assignments ====
Regionals

- Carter Blackburn & Ben McDonald - Nashville, Tennessee
- Kevin Dunn & Danny Graves - Manhattan, Kansas
- Adam Amin & Rod Delmonico - Tallahassee, Florida
- Dave Neal & Chris Burke - Columbia, South Carolina
- Clay Matvick & Paul Lo Duca - Fullerton, California
- Tom Hart & Mike Rooney - Corvallis, Oregon
- Joe Davis & Jay Walker - Starkville, Mississippi
- Mike Morgan & Danny Kanell - Louisville, Kentucky

Super Regionals

- Dari Nowkhah, Danny Graves, & Danny Kanell - Chapel Hill, North Carolina
- Tom Hart & Paul Lo Duca - Raleigh, NC
- Mike Patrick, Kyle Peterson, & Kaylee Hartung - Baton Rouge, Louisiana
- Carter Blackburn, Nomar Garciaparra, & Jessica Mendoza - Fullerton, California

College World Series

- Karl Ravech or Dave O'Brien, Kyle Peterson, & Kaylee Hartung: Afternoons
- Mike Patrick, Orel Hershiser, & Jessica Mendoza: Evenings

Regionals

- Jones Angell & John Manual - Chapel Hill, North Carolina
- Doug Sherman & Leland Maddox - Baton Rouge, Louisiana
- Dave Weekley & John Gregory - Charlottesville, Virginia
- Brett Dolan & Randy Flores - Eugene, Oregon
- Andrew Sanders & Sean McNally - Raleigh, North Carolina
- Trey Bender & Jerry Kindall - Los Angeles, Californian
- Mark Neely & Nick Belmonte - Blacksburg, Virginia
- Jim Barbar & Randy Ensor - Bloomington, Indiana

Super Regionals

- Mike Morgan & Doug Glanville - Tallahassee, Florida
- Clay Matvick & Ben McDonald - Charlottesville, Virginia
- Dave Neal & Chris Burke - Nashville, Tennessee
- Joe Davis, Alex Cora, & Jay Walker - Corvallis, Oregon

College World Series Championship

- Mike Patrick, Orel Hershiser, Kyle Peterson, Jessica Mendoza, & Kaylee Hartung

== See also ==
- 2013 NCAA Division II baseball tournament
- 2013 NCAA Division III baseball tournament
- 2013 NAIA World Series
