= 2013 Cal State Fullerton Titans baseball team =

American college baseball season

2013 Cal State Fullerton Titans baseball

Big West Champions Fullerton Regional Champion

Fullerton Super Regional, 0–2
- Conference: Big West Conference

Ranking
- Coaches: No. 10
- CB: No. 10
- Record: 51–10 (23–4 Big West)
- Head coach: Rick Vanderhook (2nd year)
- Assistant coaches: Mike Kirby (7th year); Jason Dietrich (1st year); Chad Baum (7th year)
- Home stadium: Goodwin Field

2013 Big West Conference baseball standings
	Conf.				Overall
Team	W		L	PCT	W		L	PCT
No. 10 Cal State Fullerton ‍†‍‍^{y}	23	–	4	.852	51	–	10	.836
No. 21 Cal Poly ‍‍‍^{y}	17	–	10	.630	40	–	19	.678
UC Santa Barbara ‍‍‍^{y}	17	–	10	.630	35	–	25	.583
UC Irvine ‍‍‍	15	–	12	.556	33	–	22	.600
Cal State Northridge ‍‍‍	15	–	12	.556	31	–	26	.544
Long Beach State ‍‍‍	15	–	12	.556	29	–	27	.518
Hawaii ‍‍‍	11	–	16	.407	16	–	35	.314
UC Riverside ‍‍‍	10	–	17	.370	14	–	32	.304
Pacific ‍‍‍	7	–	20	.259	15	–	39	.278
UC Davis ‍‍‍	5	–	22	.185	19	–	37	.339
† – Conference champion y – Invited to the NCAA tournament As of June 8, 2013; Rankings from Collegiate Baseball

The 2013 Cal State Fullerton Titans baseball team represented California State University, Fullerton in the 2013 NCAA Division I baseball season. The Titans played their home games at Goodwin Field and were members of the Big West Conference. The team was coached by Rick Vanderhook in his 2nd season at Cal State Fullerton.

== Roster ==
2013 Cal State Fullerton Titans roster
Pitchers: 8 Justin Garza - Freshman; 12 Grahamm Wiest - Sophomore; 15 Thomas Eshelman - Freshman; 20 Jose Cardona - Sophomore; 25 Willie Kuhl - Sophomore; 32 Koby Gauna - Sophomore; 34 Henry Omana - Freshman; 37 Joe Navilhon - Freshman; 38 Dave Birosak - Senior; 41 Kyle Murray - Freshman; 46 Miles Chambers - Freshman; 47 Shane Stillwagon - Freshman; 48 Bryan Conant - Freshman; 51 Tyler Peitzmeier - Sophomore; 53 Michael Lopez - Senior	Infielders: 2 Matt Orloff - Senior; 4 Jake Jefferies - Freshman; 5 Keegan Dale - Junior; 6 Richy Pedroza - Senior; 17 Carlos Lopez - Senior; 19 Matt Chapman - Sophomore; 23 David Olmedo-Barrera - Freshman; 26 J. D. Davis - Sophomore; 35 Tanner Pinkston - Freshman; Catchers: 10 A. J. Kennedy - Freshman; 29 Chad Wallach - Junior; 31 Jared Deacon - Junior; 54 Casey Watkins - Senior	Outfielders: 3 Anthony Hutting - Senior; 11 Austin Kingsolver - Senior; 22 Austin Diemer - Sophomore; 24 Greg Velazquez - Junior; 30 Nico Darras - Freshman; 42 Clay Williamson - Sophomore; 55 Michael Lorenzen - Junior

== Schedule ==
2013 Cal State Fullerton Titans baseball game log
Regular season
February

Date	Opponent	Site/stadium	Score	Attendance	Overall record	Big West record
February 15	Southern California	Goodwin Field	3-2	3,508	1-0	–
February 16	Nebraska	Goodwin Field	10-5		2-0	–
February 16	Nebraska	Goodwin Field	9-0	2,560	3-0	–
February 17	@ Cal State Bakersfield	Hardt Field	8–2	1,358	4–0	–
February 20	@ Pepperdine	Eddy D. Field Stadium	6–3	277	5–0	–
February 22	@ TCU	Lupton Stadium	7–2	4,294	6–0	–
February 23	@ TCU	Lupton Stadium	6–2	3,906	7–0	–
February 24	@ TCU	Lupton Stadium	7–0	3,727	8–0	–

March

Date	Opponent	Site/stadium	Score	Attendance	Overall record	Big West record
March 1	Oregon	Goodwin Field	8–2	2,898	9–0	–
March 2	Oregon	Goodwin Field	5–2		10–0	–
March 3	Oregon	Goodwin Field	1–9	2,574	10–1	–
March 5	@ San Diego	Fowler Park	3–7	724	10–2	–
March 6	@ Southern California	Dedeaux Field	11–4	269	11–2	–
March 8	Texas A&M	Goodwin Field	1–6	1,475	11–3	–
March 9	Texas A&M	Goodwin Field	2–0	2,004	12–3	–
March 10	Texas A&M	Goodwin Field	7–6	2,143	13–3	–
March 15	@ Oral Roberts	J. L. Johnson Stadium	5–0	2,143	14–3	–
March 16	@ Oral Roberts	J. L. Johnson Stadium	6–2	567	15–3	–
March 17	@ Oral Roberts	J. L. Johnson Stadium	7–4	494	16–3	–
March 19	Nebraska	Goodwin Field	8–7 (11)	1,531	17–3	–
March 20	Nebraska	Goodwin Field	10–4	1,421	18–3	–
March 22	@ Long Beach State	Blair Field	6–0	1,623	19–3	–
March 23	@ Long Beach State	Blair Field	8–6	1,591	20–3	–
March 24	@ Long Beach State	Blair Field	2–1	1,747	21–3	–
March 26	Loyola Marymount	Goodwin Field	2–3	1,443	21–4	–
March 28	Pacific	Goodwin Field	9–2	1,394	22–4	1–0
March 29	Pacific	Goodwin Field	11–6	1,824	23–4	2–0
March 30	Pacific	Goodwin Field	25–0	1,629	24–4	3–0

April

Date	Opponent	Site/stadium	Score	Attendance	Overall record	Big West record
April 2	@ UCLA	Jackie Robinson Stadium	9–6	723	25–4	–
April 5	@ UC Davis	The Pavilion	3–0	527	26–4	4–0
April 6	@ UC Davis	The Pavilion	4–2	701	27–4	5–0
April 7	@ UC Davis	The Pavilion	5–2	811	28–4	6–0
April 9	Southern California	Goodwin Field	6–4	2,472	29–4	–
April 12	UC Santa Barbara	Goodwin Field	4–3	1,882	30–4	7–0
April 13	UC Santa Barbara	Goodwin Field	10–2	2,749	31–4	8–0
April 14	UC Santa Barbara	Goodwin Field	0–2	2,381	31–5	8–1
April 16	@ Pepperdine	Eddy D. Field Stadium	8–4	279	32–5	–
April 19	@ Cal Poly	Robin Baggett Stadium	1–2	2,158	32–6	8–2
April 20	@ Cal Poly	Robin Baggett Stadium	10–5	2,352	33–6	9–2
April 21	@ Cal Poly	Robin Baggett Stadium	6–4	1,973	34–6	10–2
April 26	@ Hawaii	Les Murakami Stadium	3–4	3,285	34–7	10–3
April 27	@ Hawaii	Les Murakami Stadium	5–0	4,224	35–7	11–3
April 28	@ Hawaii	Les Murakami Stadium	3–0	3,185	36–7	12–3

May

Date	Opponent	Site/stadium	Score	Attendance	Overall record	Big West record
May 3	Long Beach State	Goodwin Field	3–2	3,136	37–7	13–3
May 4	Long Beach State	Goodwin Field	2–1	2,278	38–7	14–3
May 5	Long Beach State	Goodwin Field	9–4	2,143	39–7	15–3
May 10	@ UC Riverside	Riverside Sports Complex	14–7	529	40–7	16–3
May 11	@ UC Riverside	Riverside Sports Complex	12–0	728	41–7	17–3
May 12	@ UC Riverside	Riverside Sports Complex	6–7	334	41–8	17–4
May 14	UCLA	Goodwin Field	5–2	2,738	42–8	–
May 17	UC Irvine	Goodwin Field	5–2	2,083	43–8	18–4
May 18	UC Irvine	Goodwin Field	3–2	2,399	44–8	19–4
May 19	UC Irvine	Goodwin Field	7–5	2,551	45–8	20–4
May 23	@ Cal State Northridge	Matador Field	5–2	594	46–8	21–4
May 24	@ Cal State Northridge	Matador Field	6–4	618	47–8	22–4
May 25	@ Cal State Northridge	Matador Field	9–6	716	48–8	23–4

Postseason
NCAA Fullerton Regional

Date	Opponent	Site/stadium	Score	Win	Loss	Save	Attendance	Overall record	NCAAT record
May 31	(4) Columbia	Goodwin Field • Fullerton, CA	4–1	Wiest (9–3)	Speer (6–3)	None	3,183	49–8	1–0
June 1	(2) Arizona State	Goodwin Field • Fullerton, CA	1–0	Garza (12–0)	Kellogg (11–1)	Lorenzen (19)	3,371	50–8	2–0
June 2	(2) Arizona State	Goodwin Field • Fullerton, CA	6–1	Eshelman (12–2)	McCreery (1–4)	None	2,188	51–8	3–0
June 7	(1) UCLA	Goodwin Field • Fullerton, CA	3–5	Berg (7–0)	Davis (1–2)	None	3,244	51–9	3–1
June 8	(1) UCLA	Goodwin Field • Fullerton, CA	0–3	Vander Tuig (12–4)	Eshelman (12–3)	Berg (21)	3,303	51–10	3–2

== Ranking movements ==
Ranking movements Legend: ██ Increase in ranking ██ Decrease in ranking
	Week																			
Poll	Pre	1	2	3	4	5	6	7	8	9	10	11	12	13	14	15	16	17	18	Final
Coaches'	22	22*	9	8	9	9	6	4	4	4	3	4	4	5	4	4	10			
Baseball America	22	20	17	10	8	8	5	4	4	4	4	4	4	4	3	3	10			
Collegiate Baseball^	23	19	17	12	13	12	6	5	4	4	3	4	4	5	5	4	4	10	10	
NCBWA†	23	19	18	13	13	10	7	4	4	4	3	3	3	5	4	3	2	10		

^ Collegiate Baseball ranked 40 teams in their preseason poll, but only ranked 30 teams weekly during the season.
† NCBWA ranks 30 teams in their preseason poll, but only ranks 25 teams weekly during the season.
* A new poll was not released for this week, so for comparison purposes, the previous week's ranking is inserted in this week's slot.
