= T. J. Bruce =

American baseball coach (born 1982)

Current position
- Title: Head coach
- Team: Long Beach State
- Conference: Big West
- Record: 39–66 (.371)

Biographical details
- Born: March 29, 1982 (age 44); Torrance, California, U.S.

Playing career
- 2001–2002: Cerritos
- 2003: Texas Tech
- 2004: Long Beach State
- Position: Shortstop

Coaching career (HC unless noted)
- 2005: Long Beach State (undergrad)
- 2006: Cerritos (assistant)
- 2007–2010: Long Beach State (assistant)
- 2011–2015: UCLA (assistant)
- 2016–2022: Nevada
- 2023–2024: TCU (AHC)
- 2025–present: Long Beach State

Head coaching record
- Overall: 210–234 (.473)
- Tournaments: NCAA: 0–2

Accomplishments and honors

Championships
- 2× Mountain West regular season (2018, 2021)

Awards
- Mountain West Coach of the Year (2018, 2021)

Thomas Joseph Bruce (born March 29, 1982) is an American college baseball coach, who is the current head baseball coach for the Long Beach State Dirtbags. He served as head coach of the Nevada Wolf Pack (2016–2022).

== Early life and college baseball career ==
Born in Torrance, California, Bruce graduated from St. John Bosco High School in 2000. In high school, Bruce played baseball and soccer and earned all-state honors as a senior shortstop for the baseball team.

After high school, Bruce attended a local junior college, Cerritos College, for two years and played on the baseball team, batting .312 with 30 RBI in the 2001 and 2002 seasons. Bruce transferred to Texas Tech, batting .321 with 38 RBI.

Bruce transferred to California State University, Long Beach for his senior season and played one season for the Long Beach State Dirtbags in 2004 under head coach Mike Weathers, batting .186 with 11 RBI in 40 games with 31 starts, helping Long Beach State host an NCAA Super Regional.

== Coaching career ==
=== Early coaching career (2005–2015) ===
While completing his bachelor's degree, Bruce was an undergraduate assistant coach at Long Beach State in 2005. In 2006, Bruce returned to Cerritos as an assistant coach. Bruce then served as an assistant coach at Long Beach State from 2007 to 2010, with NCAA tournament appearances in 2007 and 2008.

From 2011 to 2015, Bruce was an assistant coach at UCLA under John Savage. With Bruce on staff, UCLA won three Pac-12 Conference titles and appeared in threeCollege World Series, winning the championship in 2013.

=== Nevada (2016–2022) ===
On June 26, 2015, Bruce got his first head coaching job at the University of Nevada, Reno. In his debut season as head coach, Bruce led Nevada to a 37–24 (20–10 Mountain West Conference) record, a tie for second place in conference standings, and a runner-up finish in the Mountain West tournament. A D1Baseball.com poll that year ranked Bruce the seventh best recruiter in NCAA Division I baseball.

In 2017, Nevada fell to a 19–36 record. However, Nevada bounced back in 2018 to a 29–24 (20–9 MW) record and first-place finish in conference standings, the second regular season conference title since 2015. Bruce was named Mountain West Coach of the Year in 2018. The 2019 Nevada team finished 30–26.

In 2020, Nevada finished with a 2–12 record; the NCAA canceled all spring sports in mid-March due to COVID-19.

For the second time under Bruce, Nevada won the Mountain West regular season championship in 2021, and Bruce earned his second Coach of the Year honors from the MW. With a 25–20 record, the 2021 Nevada team also qualified for the NCAA tournament for the first time since 2000 and first time in Bruce's tenure.

Nevada finished 29–26 (18–12 MW) and second in conference standings in 2022.

=== TCU assistant (2023-2024) ===
On June 24, 2022, Bruce accepted the associate head coach role on Kirk Saarloos's staff at TCU.

=== Long Beach State (2024-present) ===
On June 21st, 2024, Bruce accepted the head coaching job at Long Beach State.

== Head coaching record ==
Record table
Season	Team	Overall	Conference	Standing	Postseason
Nevada Wolf Pack (Mountain West Conference) (2016–2022)
2016	Nevada	37–24	20–10	T–2nd	
2017	Nevada	19–36	16–16	4th	
2018	Nevada	29–24	20–9	1st	
2019	Nevada	30–26	14–16	T–3rd	
2020	Nevada	2–12	0–0		Season canceled due to COVID-19
2021	Nevada	25–20	22–9	1st	NCAA Regional
2022	Nevada	29–26	18–12	2nd	
Nevada:		171–168 (.504)	110–72 (.604)		
Long Beach State Dirtbags (Big West Conference) (2025–present)
2025	Long Beach State	22–31	15–15	T–6th	
2026	Long Beach State	17–35	11–19	T–9th	
Long Beach State:		39–66 (.371)	26–34 (.433)		
Total:		210–234 (.473)			
National champion Postseason invitational champion Conference regular season champion Conference regular season and conference tournament champion Division regular season champion Division regular season and conference tournament champion Conference tournament champion

== See also ==
- List of current NCAA Division I baseball coaches
