= 2013 Mississippi State Bulldogs baseball team =

American college baseball season

2013 Mississippi State Bulldogs baseball

Starkville Regional champions Charlottesville Super Regional champions

College World Series Runner-up vs. UCLA, L 0–2
- Conference: Southeastern Conference
- West

Ranking
- Coaches: No. 2
- CB: No. 2
- Record: 51–20 (16–14 SEC)
- Head coach: John Cohen (5th season)
- Assistant coaches: Butch Thompson (5th season); Nick Mingione (1st season)
- Home stadium: Dudy Noble Field

2013 Southeastern Conference baseball standings
	Conf.				Overall
Team	W		L	PCT	W		L	PCT
Eastern
No. 9 Vanderbilt ^{x}‍†‍‍^{y}	26	–	3	.897	54	–	12	.818
No. 13 South Carolina ‍‍‍^{y}	17	–	12	.586	43	–	20	.683
Florida ‍‍‍^{y}	14	–	16	.467	29	–	30	.492
Kentucky ‍‍‍	11	–	19	.367	30	–	25	.545
Missouri ‍‍‍	10	–	20	.333	18	–	32	.360
Tennessee ‍‍‍	8	–	20	.286	22	–	30	.423
Georgia ‍‍‍	7	–	20	.259	21	–	32	.396
Western
No. 7 LSU ^{x}‍‍‡‍^{y}	23	–	7	.767	57	–	11	.838
No. 18 Arkansas ‍‍‍^{y}	18	–	11	.621	39	–	22	.639
No. 2 Mississippi State ‍‍‍^{y}	16	–	14	.533	51	–	20	.718
Ole Miss ‍‍‍^{y}	15	–	15	.500	38	–	24	.613
Alabama ‍‍‍^{y}	14	–	15	.483	35	–	28	.556
Texas A&M ‍‍‍^{y}	13	–	16	.448	34	–	29	.540
Auburn ‍‍‍	13	–	17	.433	33	–	23	.589
x – Division champion † – Conference champion ‡ – Tournament champion y – Invited to the NCAA tournament As of June 26, 2013; Rankings from Collegiate Baseball

The 2013 Mississippi State Bulldogs baseball team represented Mississippi State University in the 2013 NCAA Division I baseball season. The team was coached by John Cohen, in his 14th year as a collegiate head coach, and his 5th at Mississippi State. The Bulldogs play their home games at Dudy Noble Field, and compete in the Southeastern Conference's West Division.

After the 2012 season, assistant coach Lane Burroughs left Mississippi State to become the head coach at Northwestern State. Nick Mingione became the assistant coach for the 2013 season, replacing Lane Burroughs.

After a third-place finish in the SEC West and a semifinal appearance in the 2013 Southeastern Conference baseball tournament, the Bulldogs advanced through the NCAA tournament's Starkville Regional, Charlottesville Super Regional, and College World Series bracket to reach the College World Series final with an 8–1 record in the tournament.

== MLB draft ==
Player	Position	Round	Overall	MLB team
Hunter Renfroe	OF	1	13	San Diego Padres
Adam Frazier	SS	6	179	Pittsburgh Pirates
Kendall Graveman	RHP	8	235	Toronto Blue Jays
Chad Girodo	LHP	9	265	Toronto Blue Jays
Evan Mitchell	RHP	13	405	Cincinnati Reds
Daryl Norris	INF/RHP	22	666	Detroit Tigers
Luis Pollorena	LHP	23	700	Texas Rangers

== Roster ==
2013 Mississippi State Bulldogs baseball team
Players
Coaches

#	Pos.	Name	B/T	Height	Weight	Year	Previous school	Home town
17	C	Nick Ammirati	S/R	5 ft 9 in (1.75 m)	189 lb (86 kg)	Sr	Seton Hall Prep, Seton Hall / Panola College	Sparta, NJ
39	RHP	Anthony Anello	R/R	6 ft 2 in (1.88 m)	170 lb (77 kg)	Fr	Fellowship Christian School	Roswell, GA
6	OF	Derrick Armstrong	R/R	5 ft 8 in (1.73 m)	190 lb (86 kg)	Jr	Columbia Central HS / Columbia State CC	Columbia, TN
4	RHP	Ben Bracewell	R/R	6 ft 0 in (1.83 m)	205 lb (93 kg)	Jr	Briarwood Christian School	Chelsea, AL
10	OF	C.T. Bradford	L/L	5 ft 9 in (1.75 m)	170 lb (77 kg)	Jr	Pace HS	Pace, FL
15	INF	Matthew Britton	L/R	6 ft 0 in (1.83 m)	189 lb (86 kg)	So	Cullman HS	Cullman, AL
26	OF	Cody Brown	L/R	5 ft 10 in (1.78 m)	180 lb (82 kg)	Fr	Biloxi HS	Biloxi, MS
33	RHP	Preston Brown	R/R	6 ft 0 in (1.83 m)	188 lb (85 kg)	RS Fr	St. George's HS	Germantown, TN
38	RHP	Will Cox	R/R	6 ft 4 in (1.93 m)	217 lb (98 kg)	So	Amory HS	Amory, MS
3	INF	Alex Detz	L/R	5 ft 10 in (1.78 m)	177 lb (80 kg)	Jr	Mission Prep HS / Cuesta College	San Luis Obispo, CA
31	RHP	Trevor Fitts	R/R	6 ft 2 in (1.88 m)	212 lb (96 kg)	So	Pelham HS	Helena, AL
25	INF	Nick Flair	R/R	6 ft 2 in (1.88 m)	191 lb (87 kg)	RS Fr	Belle Chasse HS	Belle Chasse, LA
12	INF	Adam Frazier	L/R	5 ft 11 in (1.8 m)	174 lb (79 kg)	Jr	Oconee County HS	Bishop, GA
8	INF	Sam Frost	L/R	5 ft 10 in (1.78 m)	168 lb (76 kg)	Sr	Hoover HS	Hoover, AL
9	OF	Tyler Fullerton	R/R	5 ft 10 in (1.78 m)	179 lb (81 kg)	So	Siegel HS	Murfreesboro, TN
19	C	Daniel Garner	R/R	6 ft 0 in (1.83 m)	206 lb (93 kg)	Fr	Sparkman HS	Madison, AL
47	RHP	Myles Gentry	R/R	5 ft 11 in (1.8 m)	182 lb (83 kg)	Fr	Gulfport HS	Gulfport, MS
18	LHP	Chad Girodo	L/L	6 ft 1 in (1.85 m)	195 lb (88 kg)	Sr	Hartselle HS	Hartselle, AL
49	RHP	Kendall Graveman	R/R	6 ft 1 in (1.85 m)	197 lb (89 kg)	Sr	Benjamin Russell HS	Alexander City, AL
23	INF	Kyle Hann	R/R	5 ft 7 in (1.7 m)	179 lb (81 kg)	Fr	Hillfield Strathallan College	Oakville, Ontario, Canada
2	OF	Demarcus Henderson	R/R	5 ft 10 in (1.78 m)	171 lb (78 kg)	Jr	Wayne County HS	Waynesboro, MS
14	RHP	Jonathan Holder	R/R	6 ft 2 in (1.88 m)	229 lb (104 kg)	So	Gulfport HS	Gulfport, MS
21	LHP	Jacob Lindgren	R/L	5 ft 11 in (1.8 m)	206 lb (93 kg)	So	St. Stanislaus HS	Bay St. Louis, MS
51	RHP	Evan Mitchell	R/R	6 ft 2 in (1.88 m)	175 lb (79 kg)	Jr	Wheeler HS	Marietta, GA
48	LHP	Ross Mitchell	L/L	6 ft 1 in (1.85 m)	171 lb (78 kg)	So	Blackman HS	Smyrna, TN
5	INF	Daryl Norris	R/R	6 ft 2 in (1.88 m)	220 lb (100 kg)	Jr	Fairhope HS	Fairhope, AL
13	INF	Brett Pirtle	S/R	5 ft 9 in (1.75 m)	176 lb (80 kg)	Jr	Tyler Lee HS / Panola College	Tyler, TX
22	LHP	Luis Pollorena	L/L	5 ft 9 in (1.75 m)	169 lb (77 kg)	Sr	United HS / Marion Military Institute	Laredo, TX
32	INF	Trey Porter	L/R	6 ft 2 in (1.88 m)	218 lb (99 kg)	Sr	East Central HS / Mississippi Gulf Coast CC	Hurley, MS
36	C	Zach Randolph	R/R	6 ft 1 in (1.85 m)	187 lb (85 kg)	Jr	Amory HS / Itawamba CC	Amory, MS
35	INF	Wes Rea	R/R	6 ft 5 in (1.96 m)	272 lb (123 kg)	So	Harrison Central HS	Gulfport, MS
34	OF	Hunter Renfroe	R/R	6 ft 1 in (1.85 m)	216 lb (98 kg)	Jr	Copiah Academy	Crystal Springs, MS
7	OF	Jacob Robson	L/R	5 ft 9 in (1.75 m)	177 lb (80 kg)	Fr	Vincent Massey Secondary School	Windsor, Ontario, Canada
28	RHP	John Marc Shelly	R/R	5 ft 11 in (1.8 m)	188 lb (85 kg)	Fr	St. George's Independent Schools	Germantown, TN
29	C	Mitch Slauter	R/R	6 ft 1 in (1.85 m)	210 lb (95 kg)	Sr	Olathe North HS / Barton County CC	Olathe, KS
43	RHP	Wes Stokes	R/R	6 ft 2 in (1.88 m)	233 lb (106 kg)	Jr	West Lauderdale HS / Meridian CC	Collinsville, MS
24	RHP	Brandon Woodruff	L/R	6 ft 2 in (1.88 m)	225 lb (102 kg)	So	Wheeler HS	Wheeler, MS

Head coach

John Cohen

Assistant coach(es)

Butch Thompson (associate head coach)
Nick Mingione (assistant coach)
Tyler Bratton (volunteer assistant coach)

Legend

- (C) Team captain
- (S) Suspended
- (I) Ineligible
- Injured
- Current redshirt

Roster

== Schedule ==
2013 Mississippi State Bulldogs baseball game log
Regular season

February
Date	Opponent	Site/stadium	Score	Win	Loss	Save	Attendance	Overall record	SEC record
Feb 15	Portland	Dudy Noble Field • Starkville, MS	16–1	Lindgren (1–0)	Mccallister (0–1)	None	5,817	1–0	
Feb 16	Portland	Dudy Noble Field • Starkville, MS	2–1	R. Mitchell (1–0)	Radke (0–1)	Holder (1)	7,147	2–0	
Feb 17	Portland	Dudy Noble Field • Starkville, MS	7–1	Graveman (1–0)	Torson (0–1)	None		3–0	
Feb 17	Portland	Dudy Noble Field • Starkville, MS	6–0	Pollorena (1–0)	Yinger (0–1)	None	6,721	4–0	
Feb 19	Grambling State	Dudy Noble Field • Starkville, MS	2–0	Woodruff (1–0)	Baker (0–1)	Holder (2)	5,650	5–0	
Feb 22	Purdue	Dudy Noble Field • Starkville, MS	3–2	Holder (1–0)	McElroy (0–1)	None	5,591	6–0	
Feb 23	Samford	Dudy Noble Field • Starkville, MS	8–2	R. Mitchell (2–0)	Irby (1–1)	None		7–0	
Feb 23	Purdue	Dudy Noble Field • Starkville, MS	7–6	Girodo (1–0)	Andrzejewski (0–1)	Holder (3)	9,184	8–0	
Feb 24	Samford	Dudy Noble Field • Starkville, MS	8–1	Cox (1–0)	McGavin (0–2)	None	7,038	9–0	
Feb 26	Rhode Island	Dudy Noble Field • Starkville, MS	13–2	Girodo (2–0)	Mantle (0–1)	None	5,945	10–0	
Feb 27	Rhode Island	Dudy Noble Field • Starkville, MS	17–5	R. Mitchell (3–0)	Sterner (0–2)	None	6,343	11–0	

March
Date	Opponent	Site/stadium	Score	Win	Loss	Save	Attendance	Overall record	SEC record
Mar 1	St. Joseph's	Dudy Noble Field • Starkville, MS	10–0	Lindgren (2–0)	Stover (0–1)	None	6,133	12–0	
Mar 2	St. Joseph's	Dudy Noble Field • Starkville, MS	4–1	R. Mitchell (4–0)	Carter (0–1)	Holder (4)	6,267	13–0	
Mar 3	St. Joseph's	Dudy Noble Field • Starkville, MS	3–2	Pollorena (2–0)	Mullen (1–3)	Bracewell (1)		14–0	
Mar 3	St. Joseph's	Dudy Noble Field • Starkville, MS	2–0	Cox (2–0)	Thorpe (0–2)	Holder (5)	6,496	15–0	
Mar 5	Mississippi Valley State	Dudy Noble Field • Starkville, MS	14–2	Pollorena (3–0)	Killier (0–3)	None	6,105	16–0	
Mar 8	Central Arkansas	Dudy Noble Field • Starkville, MS	4–2	Gentry (1–0)	McClanahan (3–1)	Holder (6)	6,610	17–0	
Mar 9	Central Arkansas	Dudy Noble Field • Starkville, MS	5–7	Barr (2–0)	Woodruff (1–1)	McKinzie (1)	7,169	17–1	
Mar 10	Central Arkansas	Dudy Noble Field • Starkville, MS	3–7	Biggerstaff (2–0)	Graveman (1–1)	None	6,403	17–2	
Mar 12	vs. Southern Miss	Trustmark Park • Pearl, MS	13–5	Pollorena (4–0)	Robbins (1–2)	R. Mitchell (1)	6,948	18–2	
Mar 15	LSU	Dudy Noble Field • Starkville, MS	4–6 (10)	Bourgeois (2–0)	Cox (2–1)	Cotton (6)	8,068	18–3	0–1
Mar 16	LSU	Dudy Noble Field • Starkville, MS	3–7	Eades (4–0)	E. Mitchell (0–1)	None	9,341	18–4	0–2
Mar 17	LSU	Dudy Noble Field • Starkville, MS	10–2	Graveman (2–1)	Glenn (3–1)	None	7,686	19–4	1–2
Mar 19	Alcorn State	Dudy Noble Field • Starkville, MS	7–6	Gentry (2–0)	Brown (0–2)	Holder (7)	6,310	20–4	
Mar 22	@ Kentucky	Cliff Hagan Stadium • Lexington, KY	8–4	R. Mitchell (5–0)	Reed (2–3)	None	1,788	21–4	2–2
Mar 23	@ Kentucky	Cliff Hagan Stadium • Lexington, KY	2–3	Grundy (5–1)	Graveman (2–2)	Gott (7)		21–5	2–3
Mar 23	@ Kentucky	Cliff Hagan Stadium • Lexington, KY	3–4	Wijas (2–0)	Girodo (2–1)	None	2,284	21–6	2–4
Mar 26	Austin Peay State	Dudy Noble Field • Starkville, MS	13–5	Gentry (3–0)	Lindley (0–1)	None	6,059	22–6	
Mar 29	@ Arkansas	Baum Stadium • Fayetteville, AR	4–5	Beeks (3–0)	Pollorena (4–1)	Suggs (2)	7,845	20–7	2–5
Mar 30	@ Arkansas	Baum Stadium • Fayetteville, AR	4–1	Graveman (3–2)	Stanek (2–2)	None	8,742	23–7	3–5
Mar 31	@ Arkansas	Baum Stadium • Fayetteville, AR	1–3	Fant (2–0)	Bracewell (0–1)	Suggs (3)	7,722	23–8	3–6

April
Date	Opponent	Site/stadium	Score	Win	Loss	Save	Attendance	Overall record	SEC record
Apr 2	@ South Alabama	Eddie Stanky Field • Mobile, AL	6–4	Girodo (3–1)	Traylor (2–3)	Holder (8)	3,384	24–8	
Apr 5	Florida	Dudy Noble Field • Starkville, MS	7–3	Pollorena (5–1)	Crawford (1–5)	Holder (9)	8,414	25–8	4–6
Apr 6	Florida	Dudy Noble Field • Starkville, MS	2–0	Graveman (4–2)	Young (1–3)	None	8,564	26–8	5–6
Apr 7	Florida	Dudy Noble Field • Starkville, MS	3–8	Magliozzi (3–1)	Lindgren (2–1)	None	7,660	26–9	5–7
Apr 9	vs. Ole Miss	Trustmark Park • Pearl, MS	5–1	R. Mitchell (6–0)	Massie (0–1)	None	8,240	27–9	
Apr 12	@ Texas A&M	Olsen Field at Blue Bell Park • College Station, TX	3–2	Pollorena (6–1)	Mengden (4–2)	Holder (10)	4,857	28–9	6–7
Apr 13	@ Texas A&M	Olsen Field at Blue Bell Park • College Station, TX	9–3	Graveman (5–2)	Pineda (3–3)	None	4,676	29–9	7–7
Apr 14	@ Texas A&M	Olsen Field at Blue Bell Park • College Station, TX	15–4	Lindgren (3–1)	Ray (3–1)	Holder (11)	5,052	30–9	8–7
Apr 18 (Note: Game was suspended due to rain and completed on April 19.)	Auburn	Dudy Noble Field • Starkville, MS	6–3	R. Mitchell (7–0)	Kendrick (2–2)	Holder (12)	7,974	31–9	9–7
Apr 19	Auburn	Dudy Noble Field • Starkville, MS	1–3	O'Neal (8–2)	Graveman (5–3)	Dedrick (4)	10,143	31–10	9–8
Apr 20	Auburn	Dudy Noble Field • Starkville, MS	6–0	Lindgren (4–1)	Kendall (0–5)	None	14,562	32–10	10–8
Apr 23	@ Memphis	AutoZone Park • Memphis, TN	12–1	R. Mitchell (8–0)	Wills (3–3)	None	3,428	33–10	
Apr 26	@ Vanderbilt	Hawkins Field • Nashville, TN	1–3	Ziomek (8–2)	Pollorena (6–2)	B. Miller (12)	3,423	33–11	10–9
Apr 27	@ Vanderbilt	Hawkins Field • Nashville, TN	2–5	Beede (11–0)	Graveman (5–4)	Fulmer (3)	2,840	33–12	10–10
Apr 28	@ Vanderbilt	Hawkins Field • Nashville, TN	3–8	Pecoraro (2–1)	Lindgren (4–2)	None		33–13	10–11

May
Date	Opponent	Site/stadium	Score	Win	Loss	Save	Attendance	Overall record	SEC record
May 4	Alabama	Dudy Noble Field • Starkville, MS	10–6	R. Mitchell (9–0)	Turnbull (4–2)	Holder (13)		34–13	11–11
May 4	Alabama	Dudy Noble Field • Starkville, MS	5–4 (10)	Girodo (4–1)	Castillo (2–2)	None	7,382	35–13	12–11
May 5	Alabama	Dudy Noble Field • Starkville, MS	7–6 (11)	Holder (2–0)	Keller (3–6)	None	6,272	36–13	13–11
May 10 (Note: Game was suspended due to rain and completed on May 11.)	@ Ole Miss	Swayze Field • Oxford, MS	0–3	Mayers (4–4)	Pollorena (6–3)	Huber (11)	10,065	36–14	13–12
May 11	@ Ole Miss	Swayze Field • Oxford, MS	8–10	Smith (3–0)	Graveman (5–5)	Bailey (3)	10,053	36–15	13–13
May 12	@ Ole Miss	Swayze Field • Oxford, MS	7–6	Bracewell (1–1)	Weathersby (0–2)	None	8,083	37–15	14–13
May 14	Oral Roberts	Dudy Noble Field • Starkville, MS	3–2	Girodo (5–1)	Glanz (1–4)	Holder (14)	6,298	38–15	
May 16	South Carolina	Dudy Noble Field • Starkville, MS	5–4	Girodo (6–1)	Webb (2–2)	Holder (15)	6,755	39–15	15–13
May 17	South Carolina	Dudy Noble Field • Starkville, MS	3–5 (10)	Westmoreland (7–1)	Bradford (0–1)	Webb (16)	6,932	39–16	15–14
May 18	South Carolina	Dudy Noble Field • Starkville, MS	7–2	R. Mitchell (10–0)	Wynkoop (7–3)	None	7,687	40–16	16–14

Postseason

SEC tournament
Date	Opponent	Site/stadium	Score	Win	Loss	Save	Attendance	Overall record	SECT record
May 21	Missouri	Hoover Metropolitan Stadium • Hoover, AL	2–1 (17)	Cox (3–1)	Walsh (2–2)	None	5,404	41–16	1–0
May 22	South Carolina	Hoover Metropolitan Stadium • Hoover, AL	5–3	Gentry (4–0)	Westmoreland (7–2)	None	5,913	42–16	2–0
May 23	Texas A&M	Hoover Metropolitan Stadium • Hoover, AL	6–4	Mitchell (11–0)	Pineda (5–5)	Holder (16)	8.143	43–16	3–0
May 25	Vanderbilt	Hoover Metropolitan Stadium • Hoover, AL	8–16	Pecoraro (4–1)	Lindgren (4–3)	Miller (2)	11,963	43–17	3–1

NCAA Starkville Regional
Date	Opponent	Site/stadium	Score	Win	Loss	Save	Attendance	Overall record	NCAAT record
May 31	Central Arkansas	Dudy Noble Field • Starkville, MS	5–3	Graveman (6–5)	McClanahan (10–6)	Holder (17)	11,102	44–17	1–0
June 1	South Alabama	Dudy Noble Field • Starkville, MS	6–2	Mitchell (12–0)	Bell (6–2)	None	11,124	45–17	2–0
June 2	Central Arkansas	Dudy Noble Field • Starkville, MS	2–5	McKinzie (4–2)	Gentry (4–1)	None	10,226	45–18	2–1
June 3	Central Arkansas	Dudy Noble Field • Starkville, MS	6–1	Girodo (7–1)	Biggerstaff (6–5)	None	8,662	46–18	3–1

NCAA Charlottesville Super Regional
Date	Opponent	Site/stadium	Score	Win	Loss	Save	Attendance	Overall record	NCAAT record
June 8	Virginia	Davenport Field • Charlottesville, VA	11–6	Graveman (7–5)	Waddell (6–3)	Mitchell (2)	4,956	47–18	4–1
June 9 (Note: Game was suspended due to rain and completed on June 10.)	Virginia	Davenport Field • Charlottesville, VA	6–5	Girodo (8–1)	Silverstein (10–2)	Holder (18)	4,956	48–18	5–1

College World Series
Date	Opponent	Site/stadium	Score	Win	Loss	Save	Attendance	Overall record	CWS record
June 15	Oregon State	TD Ameritrade Park • Omaha, NE	5–4	Mitchell (13–0)	Boyd (10–4)	Holder (19)	24,473	49–18	1–0
June 17	Indiana	TD Ameritrade Park • Omaha, NE	5–4	Girodo (9–1)	Halstead (4–5)	Holder (20)	25,260	50–18	2–0
June 21	Oregon State	TD Ameritrade Park • Omaha, NE	4–1	Graveman (8–5)	Moore (14–2)	Holder (21)	18,868	51–18	3–0
June 24	UCLA	TD Ameritrade Park • Omaha, NE	1–3	Plutko (10–3)	Fitts (0–1)	Berg (24)	25,690	51–19	3–1
June 25	UCLA	TD Ameritrade Park • Omaha, NE	0–8	Vander Tuig (14–4)	Pollorena (6–4)	None	27,127	51–20	3–2

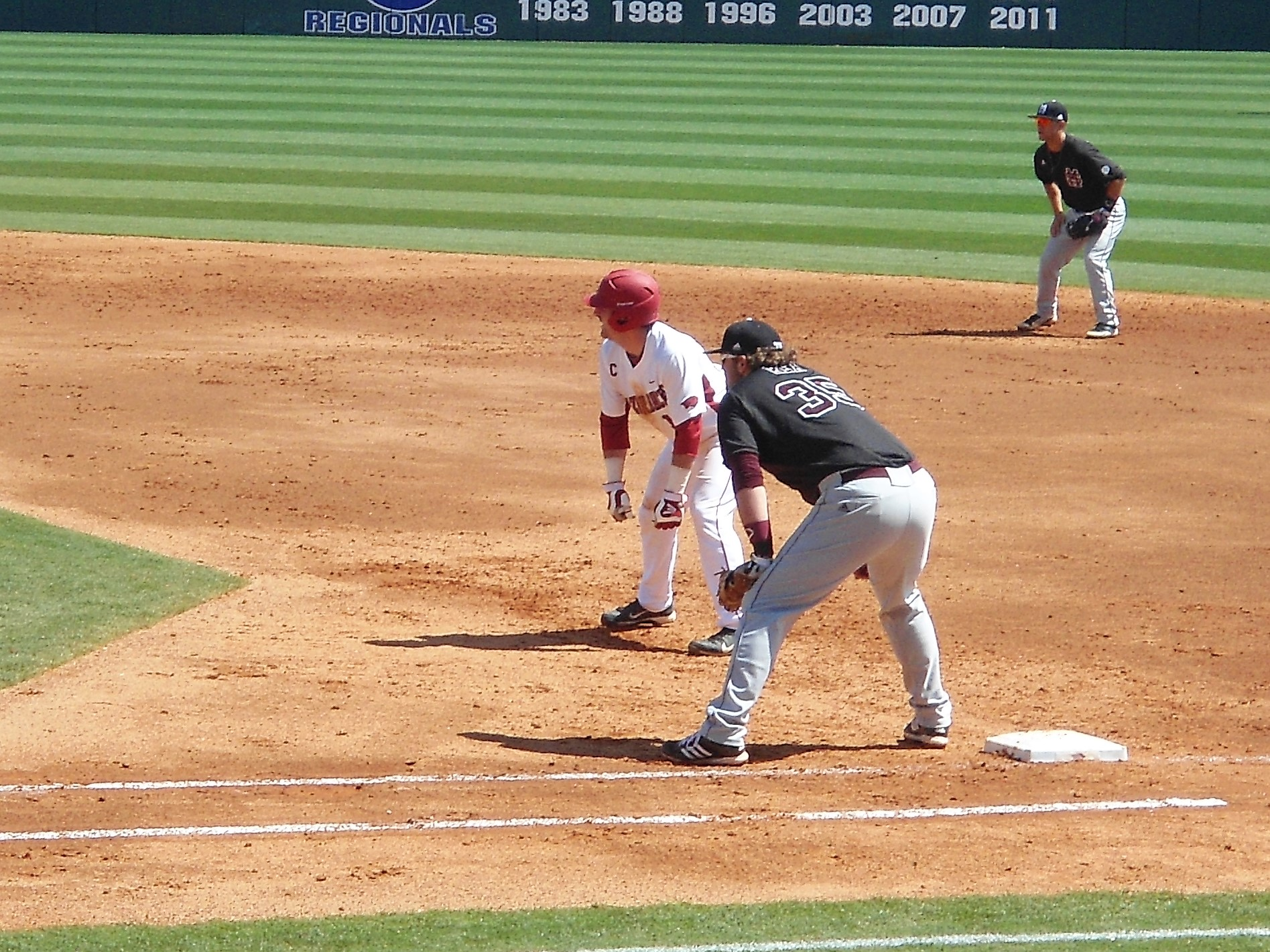
Wes Rea, paying first base against Arkansas, was a leader on the team

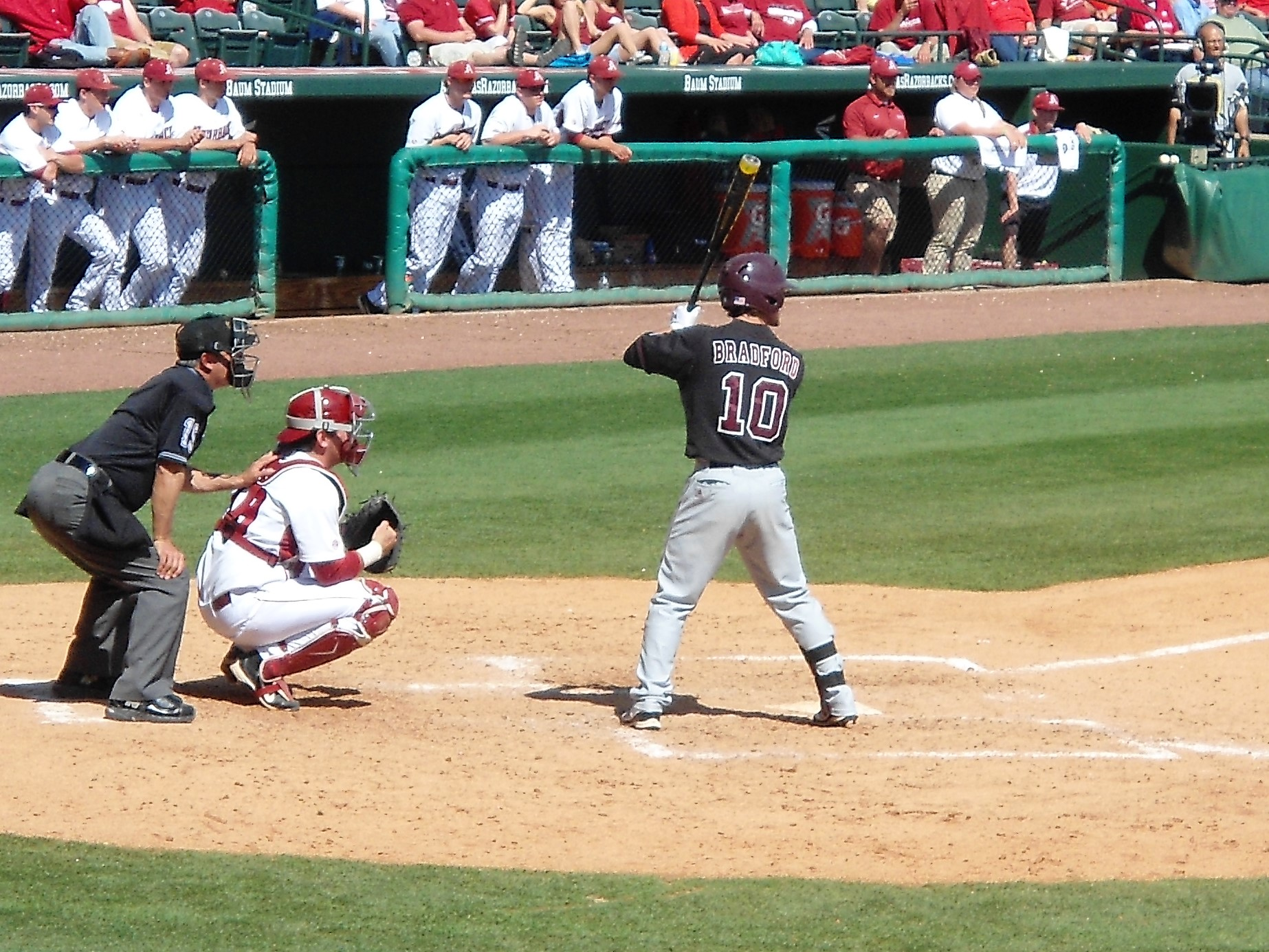
C.T. Bradford was the leadoff hitter for the Bulldogs

== Record vs. conference opponents ==
Last two do not qualify for conf. tourn. Blank are not scheduled. Blue are home games, otherwise away.

2013 SEC baseball records Source: 2013 SEC baseball game results, 2013 SEC baseball schedule
Team	W–L	ALA	ARK	AUB	FLA	UGA	KEN	LSU	MSU	MIZZ	MISS	SCAR	TENN	TAMU	VAN	Team	Div	SR	SW
ALA	14–15		1–2	2–1	.	3–0	.	1–2	0–3	2–1	0–3	.	2–1	2–0	1–2	ALA	W5	5–5	1–2
ARK	18–11	2–1		1–2	.	2–0	2–1	1–2	2–1	.	1–2	3–0	2–1	2–1	.	ARK	W2	7–3	1–0
AUB	13–17	1–2	2–1		2–1	2–1	.	0–3	1–2	1–2	2–1	.	.	2–1	0–3	AUB	W7	5–5	0–2
FLA	14–16	.	.	1–2		1–2	1–2	0–3	1–2	2–1	2–1	3–0	2–1	.	1–2	FLA	E3	4–6	1–1
UGA	7–20	0–3	0–2	1–2	2–1		1–2	.	.	1–2	.	0–3	1–0	0–3	1–2	UGA	E7	1–8	0–3
KEN	11–19	.	1–2	.	2–1	2–1		0–3	2–1	1–2	2–1	0–3	1–2	.	0–3	KEN	E4	4–6	0–3
LSU	23–7	2–1	2–1	3–0	3–0	.	3–0		2–1	3–0	2–1	1–2	.	2–1	.	LSU	W1	9–1	4–0
MSU	16–14	3–0	1–2	2–1	2–1	.	1–2	1–2		.	1–2	2–1	.	3–0	0–3	MSU	W3	5–5	2–1
MIZZ	10–20	1–2	.	2–1	1–2	2–1	2–1	0–3	.		.	1–2	1–2	0–3	0–3	MIZZ	E5	3–7	0–3
MISS	15–15	3–0	2–1	1–2	1–2	.	1–2	1–2	2–1	.		.	3–0	1–2	0–3	MISS	W4	4–6	2–1
SCAR	17–12	.	0–3	.	0–3	3–0	3–0	2–1	1–2	2–1	.		3–0	3–0	0–2	SCAR	E2	6–4	4–2
TENN	8–20	1–2	1–2	.	1–2	0–1	2–1	.	.	2–1	0–3	0–3		1–2	0–3	TENN	E6	2–7	0–3
TAMU	13–16	0–2	1–2	1–2	.	3–0	.	1–2	0–3	3–0	2–1	0–3	2–1		.	TAMU	W6	4–6	2–2
VAN	26–3	2–1	.	3–0	2–1	2–1	3–0	.	3–0	3–0	3–0	2–0	3–0	.		VAN	E1	10–0	6–0
Team	W–L	ALA	ARK	AUB	FLA	UGA	KEN	LSU	MSU	MIZZ	MISS	SCAR	TENN	TAMU	VAN	Team	Div	SR	SW

Updated for entire regular season.

== Ranking movements ==
Ranking movements Legend: ██ Increase in ranking ██ Decrease in ranking — = Not ranked
	Week																		
Poll	Pre	1	2	3	4	5	6	7	8	9	10	11	12	13	14	15	16	17	Final
Coaches'	18	18*	13	6	11	15	16	17	16	10	12	15	13	16	13	11			2
Baseball America	5	5	5	3	13	19	25	—	21	16	16	22	21	24	16	14			2
Collegiate Baseball^	13	12	9	5	8	14	19	24	26	18	17	28	24	23	18	14	12	7	2
NCBWA†	16	13	10	6	10	14	17	18	16	11	10	15	13	17	13	9			2

^ Collegiate Baseball ranked 40 teams in their preseason poll, but only ranked 30 teams weekly during the season.
† NCBWA ranks 30 teams in their preseason poll, but only ranks 25 teams weekly during the season.
* A new poll was not released for this week, so for comparison purposes, the previous week's ranking is inserted in this week's slot.
