= Jackie Robinson Stadium =

College baseball stadium in Los Angeles, California

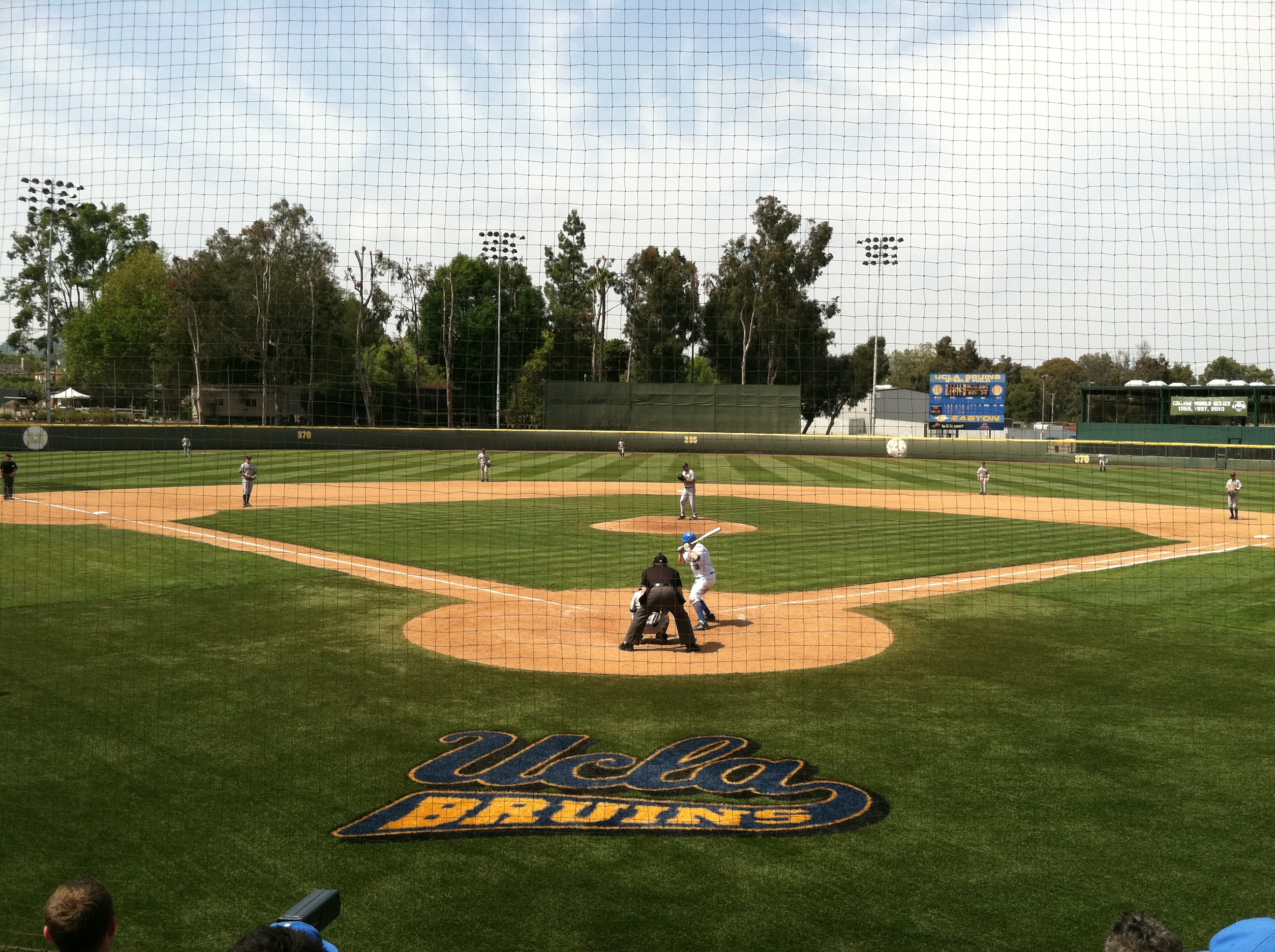
- With the old scoreboard in 2011
- Interactive map of Jackie Robinson Stadium
- Location: Los Angeles, California, U.S.
- Coordinates: 34°3′33.1″N 118°27′33.5″W
- Capacity: 1,820
- Surface: Natural grass
- Field size: Left Field – 330 ft (101 m); Left-Center – 365 ft (111 m); Center Field – 390 ft (119 m); Right-Center – 365 ft (111 m); Right Field – 330 ft (101 m)

Construction
- Opened: 1981; 45 years ago

Tenant
- UCLA Bruins baseball (NCAA) (1981–present)

Jackie Robinson Stadium is a college baseball baseball park located in Los Angeles, California. It serves as the home field of the UCLA Bruins, who compete in the Big Ten Conference. The stadium opened in 1981 and has a seating capacity of 1,820.

The stadium is named in honor of Jackie Robinson (1919–1972), a UCLA alumnus and civil rights pioneer who broke Major League Baseball’s color barrier in 1947 with the Brooklyn Dodgers. Robinson attended UCLA from 1939 to 1941 and was the university's first athlete to earn varsity letters in four sports: baseball, basketball, football, and track.

Robinson went on to play ten seasons for the Dodgers, earning Rookie of the Year honors in 1947 and the National League MVP in 1949. He helped lead Brooklyn to six National League pennants and one World Series championship in 1955. He stole home 19 times in his career—still the modern Major League record.

In recognition of his impact, Robinson's number 42 was retired across all Major League teams in 1997, the first number to be universally retired in professional sports. A statue and mural of Robinson are located at the stadium's entrance concourse.

Set at an elevation of approximately 360 feet (110 m) above sea level, the diamond is aligned nearly true north (home plate to center field), offering a traditional layout. The stadium should not be confused with the Jackie Robinson Memorial Field, dedicated in 1988 at Brookside Park in Pasadena, California, adjacent to the Rose Bowl.

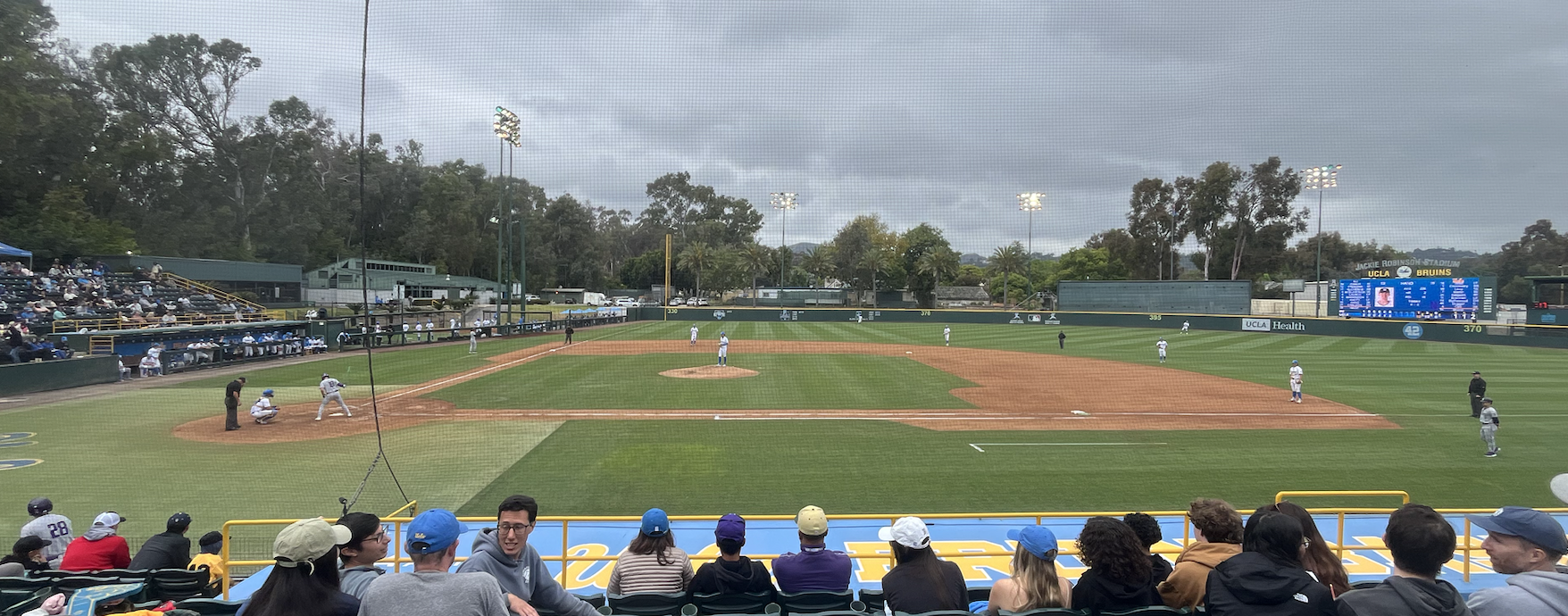
UCLA vs Northwestern, May 17, 2025. UCLA went on to win 11–1, earning a share of the Big Ten regular season title in their first season in the conference after moving from the Pac-12.

== History ==
Jackie Robinson Stadium was built on the site formerly known as Sawtelle Field, near the West Los Angeles VA Medical Center, just west of the San Diego Freeway (Interstate 405) and about one mile (1.6 km) southwest of UCLA's main campus. It replaced Joe E. Brown Field, the Bruins’ previous baseball venue, which was demolished in the 1960s to make way for the construction of Pauley Pavilion. Real estate entrepreneur Hoyt Pardee (UCLA '41), a classmate of Robinson's, donated funds for the new field and requested it be named in Jackie's honor. As reported in the Daily Bruin, Pardee stated, “I admired Jackie Robinson as a classmate for his exploits on the gridiron, the baseball diamond, the court and on the track.”

In the mid-1980s, Jackie's brother Mack Robinson took up the mission of ensuring his legacy would be visibly honored on campus. After attempts to install a statue in their hometown of Pasadena were unsuccessful, Mack established a nonprofit organization, raised $100,000, and commissioned sculptor Richard H. Ellis to create a bronze statue of Jackie. The statue was placed at the entrance of Jackie Robinson Stadium, making the venue not only a home for Bruin baseball but also a living tribute to one of the most impactful figures in American sports history.

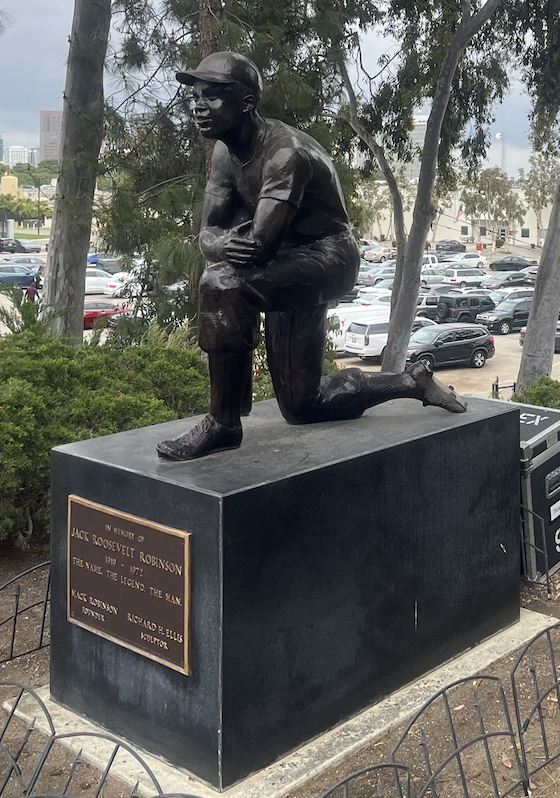
Jackie Robinson Statue

The stadium's "Steele Field" was dedicated in honor of the Steele Foundation on May 3, 2008, prior to a game against Arizona State, for its support of the stadium. The hitting facility at the stadium is named Jack and Rhodine Gifford Hitting Facility. Gifford played baseball at UCLA and graduated from its engineering school with a bachelor's degree in electrical engineering. He was a founder of Advanced Micro Devices and Maxim Integrated Products.

The ballpark's record attendance of 2,914 was set in 1997, against rival USC on March 23.

Many future Major League Baseball players have taken the field at Jackie Robinson Stadium as part of UCLA's storied baseball program. Among the standout alumni who competed here during their collegiate careers are Gerrit Cole, a multiple-time All-Star and former No. 1 overall draft pick; Trevor Bauer, the 2020 National League Cy Young Award winner; Troy Glaus, a World Series MVP and four-time All-Star; Chase Utley, a six-time All-Star second baseman; Eric Karros, the 1992 NL Rookie of the Year; and Brandon Crawford, a three-time Gold Glove shortstop. UCLA is also the only school with multiple alumni managing Major League clubs as of the start of the 2025 MLB season: Dave Roberts of the Los Angeles Dodgers and Torey Lovullo of the Arizona Diamondbacks, who both played at Jackie Robinson Stadium during their collegiate careers.

== Notable events ==
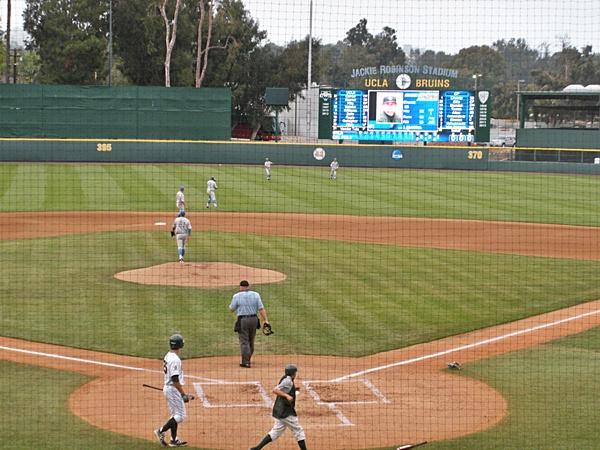
UCLA Bruins playing at the L.A. Regional on June 1, 2013, with the installation of the new video board (16'6" x 49'0")

- February 7, 1981: Jackie Robinson Stadium was officially dedicated with an exhibition game between the UCLA Bruins and the Los Angeles Dodgers. Rachel Robinson, the widow of Jackie Robinson, threw out the ceremonial first pitch. Dodgers legends Sandy Koufax, Roy Campanella, Don Newcombe, manager Tommy Lasorda, and then-owner Peter O'Malley were present to honor Robinson's legacy at the newly constructed stadium named in his honor.
- May 3, 2008: The playing surface was officially named Steele Field in recognition of a major gift from the Steele Foundation. The dedication helped fund improvements and long-term support for UCLA Athletics.
- June 5–7, 2010: UCLA swept defending national champion LSU in the NCAA Super Regional at Jackie Robinson Stadium, securing the Bruins' first trip to the College World Series since 1997. The victories were seen as a turning point for the program's national prominence.
- January 26, 2013: A new 16.5-by-49-foot (5.0 by 14.9 m) LED video board, one of the largest in the Pac-12 Conference, was presented during the 2013 season. The board was donated by the Gifford Foundation and greatly enhanced the game-day experience.
- April 14, 2013: A special Jackie Robinson Day celebration was held at the stadium to unveil a new mural of Robinson painted by Mike Sullivan. The event coincided with the release of the biographical film 42 and featured former UCLA star and Dodgers pitcher Tim Leary representing the organization.

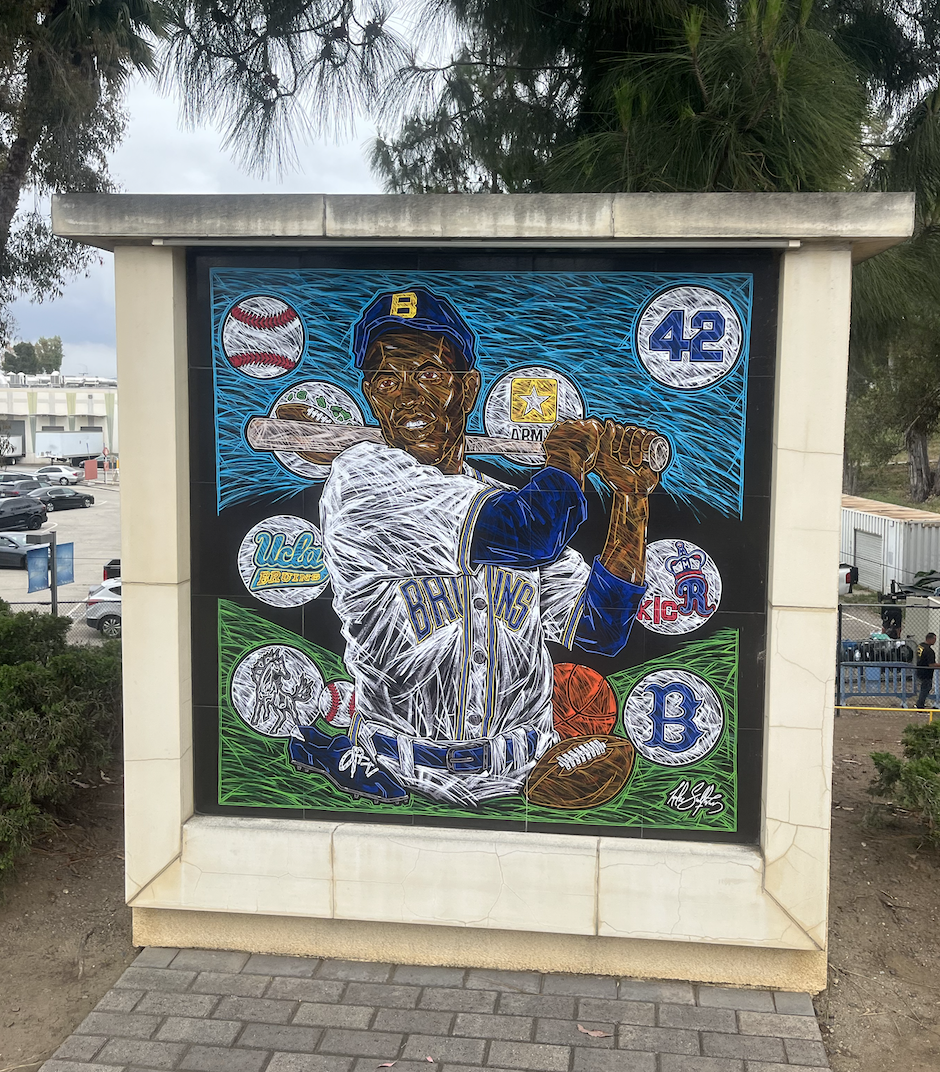
Mural of Jackie Robinson

- June 1–3, 2013: UCLA swept the NCAA Los Angeles Regional at Jackie Robinson Stadium, defeating San Diego State, Cal Poly, and San Diego. The sweep propelled the Bruins toward a perfect 10–0 postseason run, culminating in the program's first-ever NCAA national championship.
- May 15, 2015: UCLA pitchers James Kaprielian and David Berg combined to throw the first no-hitter in program history at Jackie Robinson Stadium. The Bruins defeated Arizona 1–0 in 10 innings, marking a milestone moment for the team and the venue.
- June 1, 2020: The stadium's parking lot was used by the Los Angeles Police Department (LAPD) to detain and process protesters arrested during demonstrations against police brutality. The incident drew widespread criticism, with UCLA Chancellor Gene Block calling the use of the stadium "a violation of our values." UCLA administrators later confirmed they had prior knowledge of the LAPD's request.

=== Regionals and Super Regionals, NCAA Division I baseball tournament ===
- 2010 NCAA tournament
  - Regional, June 4–7: No. 6 (1) UCLA, (2) LSU, (3) UC Irvine, (4) Kent State. Winner: UCLA.
  - Super Regional, June 11–13: No. 6 UCLA vs. Cal State Fullerton. Winner: UCLA.
- 2011 NCAA tournament
  - Regional, June 3–5: (1) UCLA, (2) Fresno State, (3) UC Irvine, (4) San Francisco. Winner: UC Irvine.
- 2012 NCAA tournament
  - Regional, June 1–3: No. 2 (1) UCLA, (2) San Diego, (3) New Mexico, (4) Creighton. Winner: UCLA.
  - Super Regional, June 8–10: No. 2 UCLA vs. TCU. Winner: UCLA.
- 2013 NCAA tournament
  - Regional, May 31–June 2: (1) UCLA, (2) Cal Poly, (3) San Diego, (4) San Diego State. Winner: UCLA.
- 2015 NCAA tournament
  - Regional, May 29–June 1: (1) UCLA, (2) Ole Miss, (3) Maryland, (4) Cal State Bakersfield. Winner: Maryland.
- 2019 NCAA tournament
  - Regional, June 1–3: No. 1 (1) UCLA, (2) Baylor, (3) Loyola Marymount, (4) Omaha. Winner: UCLA.
  - Super Regional, June 7–9: No. 1 UCLA vs. Michigan. Winner: Michigan.

=== Motion picture set ===
Jackie Robinson Stadium was the location used for the climactic scene in the 1999 film Never Been Kissed in which Josie Geller (Drew Barrymore) waits for her first real kiss from Sam Coulson (Michael Vartan).

== Court case ==
On August 30, 2013, a federal judge ruled that the United States Department of Veterans Affairs misused the West Los Angeles VA Medical Center campus where the stadium is located for a variety of uses, including the stadium, but stopped short of ordering the tenants off the property. However, the judge's ruling left open the possibility that, if not modified or reversed, UCLA could lose the right to use the stadium.

After a hearing on September 26, 2024, U.S. District Judge David O. Carter ordered the school to vacate the stadium and the nearby practice field. On October 29, the Judge reversed himself and allowed the school to regain access to the stadium though they were told to make a deal with the veterans by July 4, 2025.

== Notes ==
- August 29, 2013: U.S. District Judge S. James Otero ruled that the West Los Angeles Veterans' Administration land leased for a baseball stadium, film studio storage lot, and other businesses is illegal.
- October 21, 2013: UCLA was permitted to appeal the court decision on use of the stadium

== See also ==
- List of NCAA Division I baseball venues
- UCLA Bruins
- UCLA Bruins baseball
