= 2013 Indiana Hoosiers baseball team =

American college baseball season

2013 Indiana Hoosiers baseball

Bloomington Regional Champions Tallahassee Super Regional Champions Big Ten regular season champions Big Ten tournament champions

College World Series, L, Oregon State 0–1
- Conference: Big Ten Conference
- Record: 49–16 (17–7 Big Ten)
- Head coach: Tracy Smith (8th season)
- Home stadium: Bart Kaufman Field

2013 Big Ten Conference baseball standings
| | Conf. | | | | Overall |
| Team | W | | L | PCT | W | | L | PCT |
|---|---|---|---|---|---|---|---|---|
| No. 6 Indiana ‍†‍‡‍^{y} | 17 | – | 7 | .708 | 49 | – | 16 | .754 |
| Ohio State ‍‍‍ | 15 | – | 9 | .625 | 35 | – | 23 | .603 |
| Nebraska ‍‍‍ | 15 | – | 9 | .625 | 29 | – | 30 | .492 |
| Minnesota ‍‍‍ | 13 | – | 8 | .619 | 32 | – | 22 | .593 |
| Illinois ‍‍‍^{y} | 14 | – | 10 | .583 | 35 | – | 20 | .636 |
| Michigan ‍‍‍ | 14 | – | 10 | .583 | 29 | – | 27 | .518 |
| Michigan State ‍‍‍ | 12 | – | 9 | .571 | 33 | – | 17 | .660 |
| Iowa ‍‍‍ | 10 | – | 14 | .417 | 22 | – | 27 | .449 |
| Northwestern ‍‍‍ | 9 | – | 15 | .375 | 22 | – | 26 | .458 |
| Purdue ‍‍‍ | 6 | – | 18 | .250 | 17 | – | 34 | .333 |
| Penn State ‍‍‍ | 4 | – | 20 | .167 | 14 | – | 36 | .280 |
† – Conference champion ‡ – Tournament champion y – Invited to the NCAA tournament As of June 19, 2013; Rankings from Collegiate Baseball

The 2013 Indiana Hoosiers baseball team represented the Indiana University Bloomington in the 2013 NCAA Division I baseball season. The Hoosiers were coached by Tracy Smith, in his eighth season, and played their home games at Bart Kaufman Field.

The Hoosiers finished with 49 wins, the most in school history, against 16 losses overall, and 17–7 in the Big Ten Conference, earning the conference championship. They claimed the 2013 Big Ten Conference baseball tournament Championship, their third title in that event, and reached the College World Series for the first time in their history, where they finished 1–2, eliminated by Oregon State 1–0.

== Roster ==
2013 Indiana Hoosiers roster
| Pitchers: 8 Bell, Evan - Freshman; 12 Ralston, Kasey - Freshman; 14 Hart, Kyle - Sophomore; 21 Morris, Christian - Freshman; 23 DeNato, Joey - Junior; 25 Stadler, Walker - RS Junior; 26 Moody, Nick - Freshman; 27 Korte, Brian - Junior; 28 Harrison, Luke - Sophomore; 31 Slegers, Aaron - RS Sophomore; 34 Halstead, Ryan - Junior; 35 Coursen-Carr, Will - Freshman; 37 Effross, Scott - Freshman; 43 Belcher, Thomas - Freshman; 44 Kelzer, Jacob - Freshman | Catchers: 10 Schwarber, Kyle - Sophomore; 13 Clark, Chad - Sophomore; 45 Robertson, John - RS Freshman; Infielders: 1 Ramos, Nick - Freshman; 3 Donley, Scott - RS Sophomore; 6 Travis, Sam - Sophomore; 7 Basil, Michael - Senior; 9 Brown, Garret - Freshman; 16 DeMuth, Dustin - Junior; 29 Goldaris, Eli - Sophomore; 18 Knoblauch, Trace - Senior; 20 Smith, Casey - RS Junior; 13 Clark, Chad - Sophomore; 40 Wilhite, Brian - Freshman | Outfielders: 4 Sujka, Chris - Sophomore; 11 Nolden, Will - RS Sophomore; 22 Cureton, Justin - Senior; 24 Stadler, Sullivan - Freshman; 36 O'Conner, Tim - RS Sophomore; 38 Alfonso, Ricky - Sophomore |

== Coaches ==
2013 Indiana Hoosiers baseball coaching staff
- 13 Tracy Smith - Head Coach
- 32 Ty Neal - Assistant Coach/Recruiting coordinator
- 2 Ben Greenspan - Assistant Coach
- 30 Roger Rodeheaver - Assistant Coach

== Schedule ==
2013 Indiana Hoosiers baseball game log
Regular season

February
| Date | Opponent | Site/stadium | Score | Win | Loss | Save | Attendance | Overall record | Big Ten record |
|---|---|---|---|---|---|---|---|---|---|
| Feb 15 | #22 Louisville | Florida Auto Exchange Stadium • Dunedin, FL | 2–0 | Bell (1–0) | Green (0–1) | Halstead (1) | 722 | 1–0 | |
| Feb 16 | Connecticut | Al Lang Stadium • St. Petersburg, FL | 3–4 (15) | Feehan (1–0) | Dearden (0–1) | None | 562 | 1–1 | |
| Feb 17 | South Florida | Florida Auto Exchange Stadium • Dunedin, FL | 12–2 | Hart (1–0) | Thomas (0–1) | None | 572 | 2–1 | |
| Feb 22 | @ Georgia Southern | J. I. Clements Stadium • Statesboro, GA | 7–12 | Howard (2–0) | DeNato (0–1) | None | 1,027 | 2–2 | |
| Feb 24 | @ Georgia Southern | J. I. Clements Stadium • Statesboro, GA | 11–5 | Effross (1–0) | Richman (1–1) | None | 1,217 | 3–2 | |

March
| Date | Opponent | Site/stadium | Score | Win | Loss | Save | Attendance | Overall record | Big Ten record |
|---|---|---|---|---|---|---|---|---|---|
| Mar 1 | West Virginia | TicketReturn.com Field • Myrtle Beach, SC | 8–5 | Effross (2–0) | Paul (0–2) | Halstead (2) | 112 | 4–2 | |
| Mar 2 | @ Coastal Carolina | TicketReturn.com Field • Myrtle Beach, SC | 9–1 | DeNato (1–1) | Smith (0–1) | None | 502 | 5–2 | |
| Mar 3 | UMBC | TicketReturn.com Field • Myrtle Beach, SC | 7–1 | Slegers (1–0) | Stephenson (0–1) | None | 113 | 6–2 | |
| Mar 8 | @ Florida | Alfred A. McKethan Stadium • Gainesville, FL | 4–1 | DeNato (2–1) | Crawford (0–2) | Effross (1) | 2,828 | 7–2 | |
| Mar 9 | @ Florida | Alfred A. McKethan Stadium • Gainesville, FL | 4–6 | Carmichael (2–1) | Harrison (0–1) | Magliozzi (3) | 3,380 | 7–3 | |
| Mar 10 | @ Florida | Alfred A. McKethan Stadium • Gainesville, FL | 7–4 | Hart (2–0) | Hanhold (0–1) | None | 3,403 | 8–3 | |
| Mar 12 | Army | Chain of Lakes Park • Winter Haven, FL | 4–2 | Harrison (1–1) | Gardner (0–1) | Halstead (3) | 254 | 9–3 | |
| Mar 13 | Fairfield | Chain of Lakes Park • Winter Haven, FL | 8–0 | Coursen-Carr (1–0) | Howell (0–1) | None | 265 | 10–3 | |
| Mar 14 | Navy | Chain of Lakes Park • Winter Haven, FL | 4–0 | Slegers (2–0) | Moore (0–2) | Effross (2)' | 200 | 11–3 | |
| Mar 15 | Bucknell | Webber International University • Babson Park, FL | 8–5 | Halstead (1–0) | Kra (0–1) | None | 287 | 12–3 | |
| Mar 16 | UAB | Chain of Lakes Park • Winter Haven, FL | 12–3 | Hart (3–0) | Lee (1–1) | None | 187 | 13–3 | |
| Mar 19 | @ Miami (OH} | McKie Field at Hayden Park • Oxford, OH | 11–3 | Effross (3–0) | Thene (1–1) | None | 252 | 14–3 | |
| Mar 20 | Miami (OH) | Bart Kaufman Field • Bloomington, IN | 15–1 | Slegers (3–0) | Brown (1–1) | None | 1,324 | 15–3 | |
| Mar 22 | Penn State | Bart Kaufman Field • Bloomington, IN | 9–3 | DeNato (3–1) | Jann (1–3) | None | 692 | 16–3 | 1–0 |
| Mar 23 | Penn State | Bart Kaufman Field • Bloomington, IN | 2–0 | Hart (4–0) | Hill (1–4) | Hallstead (4) | 1,245 | 17–3 | 2–0 |
| Mar 23 | Penn State | Bart Kaufman Field • Bloomington, IN | 11–3 | Slegers (4–0) | Welsh (0–1) | None | 1,245 | 18–3 | 3–0 |
| Mar 27 | #18 Louisville | Bart Kaufman Field • Bloomington, IN | 6–2 | Effross (4–0) | Funkhouser (2–1) | None | 1,028 | 19–3 | |
| Mar 30 | @ Iowa | Duane Banks Field • Iowa City, IA | 16–5 | Harrison (2–1) | Dermody (5–1) | None | 463 | 20–3 | 4–0 |
| Mar 31 | @ Iowa | Duane Banks Field • Iowa City, IA | 9–6 | Effross (5–0) | Kuebel (1–5) | None | | 21–3 | 5–0 |
| Mar 31 | @ Iowa | Duane Banks Field • Iowa City, IA | 6–4 | Slegers (5–0) | Hibbing (0–2) | None | 583 | 22–3 | 6–0 |

April
| Date | Opponent | Site/stadium | Score | Win | Loss | Save | Attendance | Overall record | Big Ten record |
|---|---|---|---|---|---|---|---|---|---|
| Apr 3 | @ Xavier | J. Page Hayden Field • Cincinnati, OH | 9–5 | Morris (1–0) | Klever (2–3) | Effross (3) | 304 | 23–3 | |
| Apr 5 | Illinois | Bart Kaufman Field • Bloomington, IN | 3–2 | DeNato (4–1) | Johnson (4–2) | Halstead (5) | 2,757 | 24–3 | 7–0 |
| Apr 6 | Illinois | Bart Kaufman Field • Bloomington, IN | 7–3 | Hart (5–0) | Kravetz (3–1) | None | 2,754 | 25–3 | 8–0 |
| Apr 7 | Illinois | Bart Kaufman Field • Bloomington, IN | 2–3 | Castellanos (1–0) | Slegers (5–1) | Roberts (2) | 1,952 | 25–4 | 8–1 |
| Apr 9 | @ Evansville | Charles H. Braun Stadium • Evansville, IL | 10–8 | Harrison (3–1) | Jurceka (1–2) | Halstead (6) | 614 | 26–4 | |
| Apr 12 | @ Michigan State | McLane Stadium at Kobs Field • East Lansing, MI | 1–2 (11) | Alleman (1–2) | Effross (5–1) | None | 803 | 26–5 | 8–2 |
| Apr 13 | @ Michigan State | McLane Stadium at Kobs Field • East Lansing, MI | 5–6 (10) | Alleman (2–2) | Halstead (1–1) | None | 1,131 | 26–6 | 8–3 |
| Apr 14 | @ Michigan State | McLane Stadium at Kobs Field • East Lansing, MI | 5–6 | Misiewicz (3–1) | Halstead (0–2) | None | 1,083 | 26–7 | 8–4 |
| Apr 17 | Ball State | Bart Kaufman Field • Bloomington, IN | 3–5 | Manering (2–2) | Morris (1–1) | Jordan (2) | | 26–8 | |
| Apr 19 | Butler | Bart Kaufman Field • Bloomington, IN | 12–2 | DeNato (5–1) | Stout (6–4) | None | 808 | 27–8 | |
| Apr 20 | Butler | Bart Kaufman Field • Bloomington, IN | 5–2 | Hart (6–0) | Allen (1–1) | Effross (4) | 1,258 | 28–8 | |
| Apr 21 | @ Butler | Bulldog Park • Indianapolis, IN | 10–3 | Slegers (6–1) | Laing (2–2) | Korte (1) | 519 | 29–8 | |
| Apr 23 | Eastern Kentucky | Bart Kaufman Field • Bloomington, IN | 5–2 | Harrison (4–1) | Lynch (0–4) | Halstead (7) | 755 | 30–8 | |
| Apr 24 | Indiana State | Bart Kaufman Field • Bloomington, IN | 8–1 | Coursen–Carr (2–0) | Fehringer (1–2) | None | 854 | 31–8 | |
| Apr 26 | Michigan | Bart Kaufman Field • Bloomington, IN | 9–1 | DeNato (6–1) | Szkutnik (3–6) | None | 2,116 | 32–8 | 9–4 |
| Apr 27 | Michigan | Bart Kaufman Field • Bloomington, IN | 9–3 | Hart (7–0) | Hill (7–2) | Effross (5) | 1,648 | 33–8 | 10–4 |
| Apr 28 | Michigan | Bart Kaufman Field • Bloomington, IN | 3–2 (10) | Halstead (2–2) | Croneworth (0–3) | None | 1,475 | 34–8 | 11–4 |

May
| Date | Opponent | Site/stadium | Score | Win | Loss | Save | Attendance | Overall record | Big Ten record |
|---|---|---|---|---|---|---|---|---|---|
| May 4 | @ Nebraska | Haymarket Park • Lincoln, NE | 8–6 | DeNato (7–1) | DeLeon (5–4) | Halstead (8) | 1,673 | 35–8 | 12–4 |
| May 5 | @ Nebraska | Haymarket Park • Lincoln, NE | 2–3 | Kubat (4–0) | Hart (7–1) | Roeder (3) | 2,993 | 35–9 | 12–5 |
| May 6 | @ Nebraska | Haymarket Park • Lincoln, NE | 10–2 | Slegers (7–1) | Bummer (1–1) | None | 2,768 | 36–9 | 13–5 |
| May 8 | @ #10 Louisville | Jim Patterson Stadium • Louisville, KY | 3–4 | Burdi (3–2) | Halstead (2–3) | None | 3,530 | 36–10 | |
| May 10 | Northwestern | Bart Kaufman Field • Bloomington, IN | 3–1 | Effross (6–1) | Farrell (3–3) | Halstead (9) | 1,505 | 37–10 | 14–5 |
| May 11 | Northwestern | Bart Kaufman Field • Bloomington, IN | 1–12 | Magallones (5–5) | Hart (7–2) | None | 1,916 | 37–11 | 14–6 |
| May 12 | Northwestern | Bart Kaufman Field • Bloomington, IN | 9–2 | Slegers (8–1) | Morton (3–5) | None | 1,580 | 38–11 | 15–6 |
| May 14 | @ Kentucky | Cliff Hagan Stadium • Lexington, KY | 3–5 | Shepherd (5–0) | Harrison (4–2) | Gott (12) | 2,046 | 38–12 | |
| May 16 | @ Ohio State | Bill Davis Stadium • Columbus, OH | 1–2 | Riga (3–0) | DeNato (7–2) | Dempsey (17) | 1,305 | 38–13 | 15–7 |
| May 17 | @ Ohio State | Bill Davis Stadium • Columbus, OH | 7–2 (10) | Halstead (3–3) | Greve (4–1) | None | 2,257 | 39–13 | 16–7 |
| May 18 | @ Ohio State | Bill Davis Stadium • Columbus, OH | 8–1 | Hart (8–2) | Long (6–6) | None | 1,966 | 40–13 | 17–7 |

Postseason

Big Ten Tournament
| Date | Opponent | Site/stadium | Score | Win | Loss | Save | Attendance | Overall record | B1GT Record |
|---|---|---|---|---|---|---|---|---|---|
| May 23 | (4) Minnesota | Target Field • Minneapolis, MN | 4–2 | Slegers (9–1) | Snelten (5–2) | Halstead (10) | 1,761 | 41–13 | 1–0 |
| May 24 | (2) Ohio State | Target Field • Minneapolis, MN | 11–3 | DeNato (8–2) | King (7–6) | None | 1,544 | 42–13 | 2–0 |
| May 25 | (3) Nebraska | Target Field • Minneapolis, MN | 6–7 (11) | Bublitz (4–1) | Halstead (3–4) | None | 1,287 | 42–14 | 2–1 |
| May 26 | (3) Nebraska | Target Field • Minneapolis, MN | 4–3 | Coursen–Carr (3–0) | Chesnut (2–1) | None | 1,079 | 43–14 | 3–1 |

NCAA tournament Bloomington Regional
| Date | Opponent | Site/stadium | Score | Win | Loss | Save | Attendance | Overall record | NCAAT record |
|---|---|---|---|---|---|---|---|---|---|
| May 31 | Valparaiso | Bart Kaufman Field • Bloomington, IN | 5–4 | Halstead (4–4) | Kowalczyk (1–1) | None | 3,045 | 44–14 | 1–0 |
| June 1 | Austin Peay | Bart Kaufman Field • Bloomington, IN | 15–6 | DeNato (9–2) | Delgado (9–3) | None | 2,629 | 45–14 | 2–0 |
| June 2 | Austin Peay | Bart Kaufman Field • Bloomington, IN | 6–1 | Coursen–Carr (4–0) | Corey (2–2) | Halstead (11) | 3,214 | 46–14 | 3–0 |

NCAA tournament Tallahassee Super Regional
| Date | Opponent | Site/stadium | Score | Win | Loss | Save | Attendance | Overall record | NCAAT record |
|---|---|---|---|---|---|---|---|---|---|
| June 8 | @ (7) Florida State | Dick Howser Stadium • Tallahassee, FL | 10–9 | Korte (1–0) | Smith (4–2) | Coursen–Carr (1) | 4,350 | 47–14 | 4–0 |
| June 9 | @ (7) Florida State | Dick Howser Stadium • Tallahassee, FL | 11–6 | Coursen–Carr (5–0) | Sitz (10–2) | None | 4,193 | 48–14 | 5–0 |

College World Series
| Date | Opponent | Site/stadium | Score | Win | Loss | Save | Attendance | Overall record | CWS record |
|---|---|---|---|---|---|---|---|---|---|
| June 15 | #4 Louisville | TD Ameritrade Park • Omaha, NE | 2–0 | DeNato (10–2) | Green (10–4) | None | 27,122 | 49–14 | 1–0 |
| June 17 | #7 Mississippi State | TD Ameritrade Park • Omaha, NE | 4–5 | Girodo (9–1) | Halstead (4–5) | Holder (20) | 25,260 | 49–15 | 1–1 |
| June 19 | #3 Oregon State | TD Ameritrade Park • Omaha, NE | 0–1 | Boyd (11–4) | Slegers (9–2) | None | 26,035 | 49–16 | 1–2 |

== Bloomington Regional ==
Bloomington Regional Teams
| (1) Indiana Hoosiers | (2) Austin Peay Governors | (3) Florida Gators | (4) Valparaiso Crusaders |

First round
1 | Indiana | 5
2 | Valparaiso | 4
3 | Florida | 3
2 | Austin Peay | 4
Lower round 1
4 | Valparaiso | 5
2 | Florida | 4

Regional semifinals
1 | Indiana | 15
2 | Austin Peay | 6
Lower final
4 | Valparaiso | 4
2 | Austin Peay | 5

Regional final
1 | Indiana | 6
2 | Austin Peay | 1

- Bloomington Regional Scores Source

== Tallahassee Super Regional ==
Tallahassee Super Regional Game 1
| (10) Indiana Hoosiers | vs. | (7) Florida State Seminoles |

June 8, 2013, 12:06 pm (EST) at Dick Houser Stadium in Tallahassee, Florida
| Team | 1 | 2 | 3 | 4 | 5 | 6 | 7 | 8 | 9 | R | H | E |
|---|---|---|---|---|---|---|---|---|---|---|---|---|
| (10)Indiana | 0 | 0 | 0 | 4 | 0 | 1 | 4 | 1 | 0 | 10 | 11 | 3 |
| (7) Florida State | 0 | 0 | 0 | 4 | 1 | 1 | 0 | 2 | 1 | 9 | 12 | 3 |
WP: Brian Korte (1–0) LP: Gage Smith (4–2) Sv: Will Coursen-Carr (1); Home runs: IU: Kyle Schwarber; FSU: John Nogowski; Attendance: 4,350

Tallahassee Super Regional Game 2
| (7) Florida State Seminoles | vs. | (10) Indiana Hoosiers |

June 9, 2013, 1:06 pm (EST) at Dick Houser Stadium in Tallahassee, Florida
| Team | 1 | 2 | 3 | 4 | 5 | 6 | 7 | 8 | 9 | R | H | E |
|---|---|---|---|---|---|---|---|---|---|---|---|---|
| (7)Florida State | 0 | 2 | 0 | 0 | 3 | 0 | 0 | 0 | 1 | 6 | 11 | 0 |
| (10) Indiana | 4 | 0 | 1 | 0 | 2 | 0 | 1 | 3 | x | 11 | 11 | 1 |
WP: Will Coursen-Carr (5–0) LP: Scott Sitz (10–2); Home runs: FSU: None; IU: Sam Travis, Scott Donley; Attendance: 4,193

== Ranking movements ==
Ranking movements Legend: ██ Increase in ranking ██ Decrease in ranking — = Not ranked
| | Week | | | | | | | | | | | | | | | | | | |
| Poll | Pre | 1 | 2 | 3 | 4 | 5 | 6 | 7 | 8 | 9 | 10 | 11 | 12 | 13 | 14 | 15 | 16 | 17 | Final |
|---|---|---|---|---|---|---|---|---|---|---|---|---|---|---|---|---|---|---|---|
| Coaches' | — | —* | — | — | — | — | 23 | 18 | 15 | 20 | 18 | 17 | 16 | 17 | 16 | 13 | | | 7 |
| Baseball America | — | — | — | — | 24 | 22 | 19 | 16 | 12 | 19 | 17 | 16 | 14 | 15 | 12 | 8 | | | 7 |
| Collegiate Baseball^ | — | — | — | — | — | — | 25 | 16 | 13 | — | — | 21 | 21 | 21 | 22 | 22 | 16 | 8 | 6 |
| NCBWA† | — | — | — | — | — | 29 | 24 | 17 | 13 | 19 | 17 | 17 | 16 | 15 | 15 | 12 | 12 | | 7 |

^ Collegiate Baseball ranked 40 teams in their preseason poll, but only ranked 30 teams weekly during the season.
† NCBWA ranks 30 teams in their preseason poll, but only ranks 25 teams weekly during the season.
* A new poll was not released for this week, so for comparison purposes, the previous week's ranking is inserted in this week's slot.
