= 2013 Big Ten baseball tournament =

2013 Big Ten Conference baseball tournament
- Teams: 6
- Format: Double-elimination with single bye for top two teams
- Finals site: Target Field; Minneapolis, MN
- Champions: Indiana (3rd title)
- Winning coach: Tracy Smith (2nd title)
- MVP: Sam Travis (Indiana)
- Television: BTN

2013 Big Ten Conference baseball standings
	Conf.				Overall
Team	W		L	PCT	W		L	PCT
No. 6 Indiana ‍†‍‡‍^{y}	17	–	7	.708	49	–	16	.754
Ohio State ‍‍‍	15	–	9	.625	35	–	23	.603
Nebraska ‍‍‍	15	–	9	.625	29	–	30	.492
Minnesota ‍‍‍	13	–	8	.619	32	–	22	.593
Illinois ‍‍‍^{y}	14	–	10	.583	35	–	20	.636
Michigan ‍‍‍	14	–	10	.583	29	–	27	.518
Michigan State ‍‍‍	12	–	9	.571	33	–	17	.660
Iowa ‍‍‍	10	–	14	.417	22	–	27	.449
Northwestern ‍‍‍	9	–	15	.375	22	–	26	.458
Purdue ‍‍‍	6	–	18	.250	17	–	34	.333
Penn State ‍‍‍	4	–	20	.167	14	–	36	.280
† – Conference champion ‡ – Tournament champion y – Invited to the NCAA tournament As of June 19, 2013; Rankings from Collegiate Baseball

The 2013 Big Ten Conference baseball tournament was held at Target Field in Minneapolis, MN from May 22 through 25. The six team, double-elimination tournament determined the league champion for the 2013 NCAA Division I baseball season. Indiana won the tournament to claim the Big Ten Conference's automatic bid to the 2013 NCAA Division I baseball tournament. The event was aired on the Big Ten Network.

== Format and seeding ==
The 2013 tournament was a 6-team double-elimination tournament. The top six teams based on conference regular season winning percentage earned invites to the tournament. The top two seeds received a single bye into the semifinals (2nd Round). The 1 seed played the lowest seeded Round 1 winner, while the 2 seed played the highest seeded Round 1 winner.

Team	W	L	Pct.	GB	Seed
Indiana	17	7	.708	–	1
Ohio State	15	9	.625	2	2
Nebraska	15	9	.625	2	3
Minnesota	13	8	.619	2.5	4
Illinois	14	10	.583	3	5
Michigan	14	10	.583	3	6
Michigan State	12	9	.571	3.5	–
Iowa	10	14	.417	7	–
Northwestern	9	15	.375	8	–
Purdue	6	18	.250	11	–
Penn State	4	20	.167	13	–

== Tournament ==
Upper round 1	Upper round 2	Upper final	Final
1	Indiana	4
4	Minnesota	3	4	Minnesota	2
5	Illinois	2	1	Indiana	11
2	Ohio St	3
2	Ohio State	3
3	Nebraska	11	3	Nebraska	2
6	Michigan	2
1	Indiana	6	4
3	Nebraska	7	3
Lower round 1	Lower round 2	Lower round 3	Lower final
2	Ohio State	0
3	Nebraska	7	3	Nebraska	5
5	Illinois	1	4	Minnesota	3
5	Illinois	3	4	Minnesota	3
6	Michigan	2

== All-Tournament Team ==
The following players were named to the All-Tournament Team.

POS	Player	Team
P	Will Coursen-Carr	Indiana
P	Aaron Slegers	Indiana
P	Christian DeLeon	Nebraska
DH	Eli Goldaris	Indiana
C	Kyle Schwarber	Indiana
1B	Sam Travis	Indiana
2B	Pat Kelly	Nebraska
3B	Dustin DeMuth	Indiana
SS	Thomas Lindauer	Illinois
SS	Bryan Peters	Nebraska
OF	Casey Smith	Indiana
OF	Troy Larson	Minnesota
OF	Chad Christensen	Nebraska
DH	Kash Kalkowski	Nebraska

Most Outstanding Player: Sam Travis, Indiana
