= 2013 Big East Conference baseball tournament =

American college baseball tournament

- Teams: 8
- Format: Double-elimination tournament
- Finals site: Bright House Field; Clearwater, FL
- Champions: Connecticut (3rd title)
- Winning coach: Jim Penders (1st title)
- MVP: Billy Ferriter (Connecticut)
- Television: ESPNU (Championship game)

2013 Big East Conference baseball standings
	Conf.				Overall
Team	W		L	PCT	W		L	PCT
No. 8 Louisville ‍†‍‍^{y}	20	–	4	.833	51	–	14	.785
Pittsburgh ‍‍‍	18	–	6	.750	42	–	17	.712
Seton Hall ‍‍‍	18	–	6	.750	37	–	19	.661
South Florida ‍‍‍	17	–	7	.708	36	–	22	.621
Rutgers ‍‍‍	14	–	10	.583	28	–	30	.483
St. John's ‍‍‍	10	–	14	.417	23	–	35	.397
Notre Dame ‍‍‍	10	–	14	.417	34	–	24	.586
Connecticut ‍‍‡‍^{y}	9	–	15	.375	35	–	28	.556
Cincinnati ‍‍‍	6	–	18	.250	24	–	32	.429
Georgetown ‍‍‍	5	–	19	.208	25	–	28	.472
Villanova ‍‍‍	5	–	19	.208	14	–	39	.264
† – Conference champion ‡ – Tournament champion y – Invited to the NCAA tournament As of June 18, 2013; Rankings from Collegiate Baseball

The 2013 Big East Conference baseball tournament was held at Bright House Field in Clearwater, Florida, from May 22 through 26. The event, held at the end of the conference regular season, determined the champion of the Big East Conference for the 2013 season. Eight seeded Connecticut won their third tournament championship to claim the conference's automatic bid to the 2013 NCAA Division I baseball tournament.

It was also the last tournament for the original Big East Conference. Following several years of instability, culminating in a split of the conference along football lines, the seven member schools that did not sponsor Division I FBS football purchased the "Big East" name and formed a new Big East in July 2013. The FBS schools that had not moved to other conferences by that time joined with several new members and reorganized as the American Athletic Conference, retaining the charter of the original Big East.

== Format and seeding ==
The tournament used a double-elimination format, with the field divided into two brackets. The winners of each bracket faced off in a single championship game. Seton Hall claimed the second seed over Pittsburgh and St. John's took the sixth seed over Notre Dame by tiebreaker.

Team	W	L	Pct.	GB	Seed
Louisville	20	4	.833	–	1
Seton Hall	18	6	.750	2	2
Pittsburgh	18	6	.750	2	3
South Florida	17	7	.708	3	4
Rutgers	14	10	.583	6	5
St. John's	10	14	.417	10	6
Notre Dame	10	14	.417	10	7
Connecticut	9	15	.375	11	8
Cincinnati	6	18	.250	14	–
Villanova	5	19	.208	15	–
Georgetown	5	19	.208	15	–

== Bracket ==
First round
1	Louisville	2*
8	Connecticut	3*
4	South Florida	5
5	Rutgers	2
1	Louisville	1
5	Rutgers	9
3	Pittsburgh	10
6	St. John's	2
2	Seton Hall	0
7	Notre Dame	5
6	St. John's	2
2	Seton Hall	7

Second round
8	Connecticut	8
4	South Florida	7
5	Rutgers	2
4	South Florida	1
3	Pittsburgh	3
7	Notre Dame	5
2	Seton Hall	6*
3	Pittsburgh	7*

Semifinals
8	Connecticut	2	—
5	Rutgers	1	—
7	Notre Dame	3†	—
3	Pittsburgh	2†	—

Final
8	Connecticut	8
7	Notre Dame	1

*Indicates game required 12 innings. † - Indicates game required 10 innings.

== All-Tournament Team ==
The following players were named to the All-Tournament Team.

Pos	Name	School
P	David Mahoney	Connecticut
P	Anthony Marzi	Connecticut
C	Elvin Soto	Pittsburgh
IF	Charlie Law	Rutgers
IF	Frank DeSico	Notre Dame
IF	Eric Jagielo	Notre Dame
IF	Tom Verdi	Connecticut
OF	Billy Ferriter	Connecticut
OF	Steven Vranka	Pittsburgh
OF	Brian O’Grady	Rutgers
DH	Ryan Sullivan	Seton Hall

=== Most Valuable Player ===
Billy Ferriter was named Tournament Most Valuable Player. Ferriter was an outfielder for Connecticut.
