= 2013 Louisville Cardinals baseball team =

American college baseball season

2013 Louisville Cardinals baseball

Nashville Super Regional champions Louisville Regional champions Big East regular season champions

College World Series, 0–2
- Conference: Big East Conference
- Record: 51–14 (20–4 Big East)
- Head coach: Dan McDonnell (7th season)
- Assistant coaches: Chris Lemonis (7th season); Roger Williams (7th season); Kyle Cheesebrough (2nd season)
- Home stadium: Jim Patterson Stadium

2013 Big East Conference baseball standings
	Conf.				Overall
Team	W		L	PCT	W		L	PCT
No. 8 Louisville ‍†‍‍^{y}	20	–	4	.833	51	–	14	.785
Pittsburgh ‍‍‍	18	–	6	.750	42	–	17	.712
Seton Hall ‍‍‍	18	–	6	.750	37	–	19	.661
South Florida ‍‍‍	17	–	7	.708	36	–	22	.621
Rutgers ‍‍‍	14	–	10	.583	28	–	30	.483
St. John's ‍‍‍	10	–	14	.417	23	–	35	.397
Notre Dame ‍‍‍	10	–	14	.417	34	–	24	.586
Connecticut ‍‍‡‍^{y}	9	–	15	.375	35	–	28	.556
Cincinnati ‍‍‍	6	–	18	.250	24	–	32	.429
Georgetown ‍‍‍	5	–	19	.208	25	–	28	.472
Villanova ‍‍‍	5	–	19	.208	14	–	39	.264
† – Conference champion ‡ – Tournament champion y – Invited to the NCAA tournament As of June 18, 2013; Rankings from Collegiate Baseball

The 2013 Louisville Cardinals baseball team represented the University of Louisville in the 2013 NCAA Division I baseball season. The Cardinals were coached by Dan McDonnell, in his seventh season, and played their home games at Jim Patterson Stadium.

The Cardinals finished with 51 wins, the most in school history, against 14 losses overall, and 20–4 in the Big East Conference, earning the conference championship. They reached the College World Series for the second time in their history, where they finished 0–2, eliminated by Oregon State 11–4.

== Roster ==
2013 Louisville Cardinals roster
Pitchers: 11 Joe Ceja - Sophomore; 13 Cody Ege - Junior; 16 Kyle Funkhouser - Freshman; 19 Nick Burdi - Sophomore; 24 Chad Green - Junior; 25 Robert Strader - Freshman; 28 Brandon Alphin - Sophomore; 31 Joe Filomeno - Sophomore; 32 Jordan Simons - Freshman; 33 Adam Schemenauer - Freshman; 34 Michael Bollmer - Freshman; 35 Dace Kime - Junior; 40 Jared Ruxer - Sophomore; 44 Jeff Thompson - Junior; 45 Kyle McGrath - Sophomore	Catchers: 14 Kyle Gibson - Junior; 38 Aaron Gershenfeld - Junior; 41 Shane Crain - Junior; Infielders: 1 Nick Ratajczak - Senior; 2 Zach Lucas - Sophomore; 4 Alex Chittenden - Junior; 5 Anthony Kidston - Freshman; 7 Zack Soria - Freshman; 8 Danny Rosenbaum - Freshman; 9 Jordan Striegel - Freshman; 17 Sutton Whiting - Sophomore; 26 Zak Wasserman - Senior; 30 Ty Young - Junior; 36 Jonah Philley - Freshman	Outfielders: 10 Adam Engel - Junior; 15 Cole Sturgeon - Junior; 18 Mike White - Sophomore; 20 Coco Johnson - Junior; 42 Jeff Gardner - Junior; 43 Matt Helms - Senior

== Coaches ==
2013 Louisville Cardinals baseball coaching staff
- 9 Dan McDonnell - Head coach
- 22 Chris Lemonis - Assistant coach/Recruiting coordinator
- 23 Roger Williams - Assistant coach/Pitching Coach
- 21 Kyle Cheesebrough - Assistant coach

== Schedule ==
Legend
	Louisville win
	Louisville loss
	Postponement
**Bold**	Louisville team member

2013 Louisville Cardinals baseball game log
Regular season (46–10)

February (7–1)
Date	Opponent	Rank	Stadium Site	Score	Win	Loss	Save	Attendance	Overall record	Big East Record
Feb 15	vs. Indiana	No. 4	Florida Auto Exchange Stadium; Dunedin, FL	**L** 0–2	Bell (1–0)	**Green (0–1)**	Halstead (1)	722	0–1	
Feb 16	vs. South Florida	No. 4	Bright House Field; Clearwater, FL	**W** 10–1	**Thompson (1–0)**	Gonzalez (0–1)	None	415	1–1	
Feb 17	vs. Purdue	No. 4	Al Lang Stadium; St. Petersburg, FL	**W** 9–4	**Kidston (1–0)**	De LaRiva (0–1)	None	356	2–1	
Feb 20	Eastern Kentucky	No. 4	Jim Patterson Stadium; Louisville, KY	**W** 17–6	**Kime (1–0)**	Cervantes (0–1)	None	1,122	3–1	
Feb 22	Akron	No. 4	Jim Patterson Stadium; Louisville, KY	**W** 7–0	**Green (1–1)**	Pusateri (0–2)	None	1,033	4–1	
Feb 23	Akron	No. 4	Jim Patterson Stadium; Louisville, KY	**W** 8–0	**Thompson (2–0)**	Valek (0–1)	None	1,461	5–1	
Feb 24	Akron	No. 4	Jim Patterson Stadium; Louisville, KY	**W** 2–1	**Kidston (2–0)**	Brubaker (0–2)	**Burdi (1)**	1,384	6–1	
Feb 26	Morehead State	No. 4	Jim Patterson Stadium; Louisville, KY	**W** 13–4	**Kime (2–0)**	Whittle (1–1)	None	585	7–1	

March (15–4)
Date	Opponent	Rank	Stadium Site	Score	Win	Loss	Save	Attendance	Overall record	Big East Record
Mar 1	Kent State	No. 4	Jim Patterson Stadium; Louisville, KY	**W** 14–2	**Green (2–1)**	Skulina (0–1)	None	664	8–1	
Mar 2	Kent State	No. 4	Jim Patterson Stadium; Louisville, KY	**W** 10–3	**Thompson (3–0)**	Williams (1–1)	**Kidston (1)**	671	9–1	
Mar 3	Kent State	No. 4	Jim Patterson Stadium; Louisville, KY	**L** 2–3	Wilson (1–2)	**Ege (0–1)**	Dorsch (1)	956	9–2	
Mar 6	at Eastern Kentucky	No. 4	Turkey Hughes Field; Richmond, KY	Postponed						
Mar 8	Alabama	No. 5	Jim Patterson Stadium; Louisville, KY	**W** 4–3^{14}	**McGrath (1–0)**	Shaw (0–1)	None	1,659	10–2	
Mar 9	Alabama	No. 5	Jim Patterson Stadium; Louisville, KY	**W** 6–0	**Thompson (4–0)**	Keller (2–2)	None	3,022	11–2	
Mar 10	Alabama	No. 5	Jim Patterson Stadium; Louisville, KY	**W** 8–7^{10}	**McGrath (2–0)**	Greer (1–1)	None	3,240	12–2	
Mar 13	Purdue	No. 4	Jim Patterson Stadium; Louisville, KY	**W** 3–1	**Kidston (3–0)**	Lutz (0–2)	**Burdi (2)**	2,021	13–2	
Mar 15	Xavier	No. 4	Jim Patterson Stadium; Louisville, KY	**W** 6–1	**Green (3–1)**	Richard (2–2)	**Kime (1)**	1,263	14–2	
Mar 16	Xavier	No. 4	Jim Patterson Stadium; Louisville, KY	**W** 7–0	**Thompson (5–0)**	Westrick (1–3)	None	1,703	15–2	
Mar 16	Xavier	No. 4	Jim Patterson Stadium; Louisville, KY	**W** 8–6	**Funkhouser (1–0)**	Klever (2–2)	**Burdi (3)**	1,217	16–2	
Mar 19	Southern California	No. 4	Jim Patterson Stadium; Louisville, KY	**W** 13–6	**McGrath (3–0)**	Silva (0–1)	None	1,026	17–2	
Mar 20	Southern California	No. 4	Jim Patterson Stadium; Louisville, KY	**W** 6–3	**Funkhouser (2–0)**	Kriske (0–1)	**Burdi (4)**	769	18–2	
Mar 22	Rutgers	No. 4	Jim Patterson Stadium; Louisville, KY	**L** 2–6	Smorol (2–1)	**Green (3–2)**	None	801	18–3	0–1
Mar 23	Rutgers	No. 4	Jim Patterson Stadium; Louisville, KY	**W** 4–0	**McGrath (4–0)**	Gebler (1–3)	**Burdie (5)**	1,142	19–3	1–1
Mar 23	Rutgers	No. 4	Jim Patterson Stadium; Louisville, KY	**L** 3–7	Law (1–2)	**Ruxer (0–1)**	None	1,142	19–4	1–2
Mar 27	at No. 19 Indiana	No. 10	Bart Kaufman Field; Bloomington, IN	**L** 2–6	Effross (4–0)	**Funkhouser (2–1)**	None	1,028	19–5	
Mar 28	No. 15 Notre Dame	No. 10	Jim Patterson Stadium; Louisville, KY	**W** 10–5	**Green (4–2)**	Fitzgerald (1–3)	**McGrath (1)**	923	20–5	2–2
Mar 29	No. 15 Notre Dame	No. 10	Jim Patterson Stadium; Louisville, KY	**W** 2–1	**Burdi (1–0)**	Slania (2–1)	None	1,009	21–5	3–2
Mar 30	No. 15 Notre Dame	No. 10	Jim Patterson Stadium; Louisville, KY	**W** 10–5	**Kidston (4–0)**	Connaughton (0–1)	**McGrath (2)**	2,351	22–5	4–2

April (12–5)
Date	Opponent	Rank	Stadium Site	Score	Win	Loss	Save	Attendance	Overall record	Big East Record
Apr 2	No. 6 Kentucky	No. 9	Jim Patterson Stadium; Louisville, KY	**L** 4–5^{10}	Gott (4–0)	**Burdi (1–1)**	None	4,733	22–6	
Apr 5	at Cincinnati	No. 9	Marge Schott Stadium; Cincinnati, OH	**W** 8–3	**Ege (1–1)**	Walsh (1–1)	None	1,604	23–6	5–2
Apr 6	at Cincinnati	No. 9	Great American Ballpark; Cincinnati, OH	**W** 4–1	**Thompson (6–0)**	Patishall (0–4)	None	4,500	24–6	6–2
Apr 7	at Cincinnati	No. 9	Marge Schott Stadium; Cincinnati, OH	**W** 7–4	**Burdi (2–1)**	Strenge (1–4)	None	1,737	25–6	7–2
Apr 9	at Western Kentucky	No. 8	Nick Denes Field; Bowling Green, KY	**L** 5–6	Bartley (2–0)	**Kime (2–1)**	None	2,370	25–7	
Apr 12	Elon	No. 8	Jim Patterson Stadium; Louisville, KY	**W** 10–1	**Green (5–2)**	Clark (4–3)	None	1,321	26–7	
Apr 13	Elon	No. 8	Jim Patterson Stadium; Louisville, KY	**W** 7–5	**Ege (2–1)**	Medick (5–2)	**Burdi (6)**	4,573	27–7	
Apr 14	Elon	No. 8	Jim Patterson Stadium; Louisville, KY	**W** 4–0	**Kidston (5–0)**	Webb (3–2)	**Sturgeton (1)**	1,542	28–7	
Apr 16	at No. 15 Kentucky	No. 8	Cliff Hagan Stadium; Lexington, KY	**W** 12–5	**Ege (3–1)**	Cody (3–2)	None	3,589	29–7	
Apr 19	at St. John's	No. 8	Jack Kaiser Stadium; New York, NY	**W** 7–4	**McGrath (5–0)**	Hackimer (0–1)	**Burdi (7)**	435	30–7	8–2
Apr 20	at St. John's	No. 8	Jack Kaiser Stadium; New York, NY	**L** 3–4	Hagan (3–5)	**Thompson (6–1)**	Hackimer (7)	239	30–8	8–3
Apr 21	at St. John's	No. 8	Jack Kaiser Stadium; New York, NY	**L** 5–6	Graziano (3–0)	**Burdi (2–2)**	Katz (1)	353	30–9	8–4
Apr 23	No. 3 Vanderbilt	No. 12	Jim Patterson Stadium; Louisville, KY	**L** 2–10	Buehler (3–1)	**McGrath (5–1)**	None	2,516	30–10	
Apr 26	Georgetown	No. 12	Jim Patterson Stadium; Louisville, KY	**W** 2–1	**Green (6–2)**	Vander Linden (3–3)	**Burdi (8)**	2,202	31–10	9–4
Apr 27	Georgetown	No. 12	Jim Patterson Stadium; Louisville, KY	**W** 6–2	**Thompson (7–1)**	Polus (2–6)	None	1,006	32–10	10–4
Apr 28	Georgetown	No. 12	Jim Patterson Stadium; Louisville, KY	**W** 13–7	**McGrath (6–1)**	Smith (3–1)	None	1,421	33–10	11–4
Apr 30	Western Kentucky	No. 12	Jim Patterson Stadium; Louisville, KY	**W** 6–2	**Kime (3–1)**	Mercer (0–1)	**Funkhouser (1)**	2,194	34–10	

May (12–0)
Date	Opponent	Rank	Stadium Site	Score	Win	Loss	Save	Attendance	Overall record	Big East Record
May 3	at Villanova	No. 13	Villanova Ballpark at Plymouth; Plymouth Meeting, PA	**W** 6–0	Green (7–2)	Ostapeck (0–8)	**Burdi (9)**	463	35–10	12–4
May 4	at Villanova	No. 13	Villanova Ballpark at Plymouth; Plymouth Meeting, PA	**W** 6–5	Thompson (8–1)	Young (1–7)	**Burdi (10)**	311	36–10	13–4
May 5	at Villanova	No. 13	Villanova Ballpark at Plymouth; Plymouth Meeting, PA	**W** 6–2	Kime (4–1)	Harris (4–6)	None	479	37–10	14–4
May 7	at Eastern Kentucky	No. 12	Turkey Hughes Field; Richmond, KY	**W** 4–0	Funkhouser (3–1)	Grimm (4–5)	None	150	38–10	
May 8	at No. 14 Indiana	No. 12	Jim Patterson Stadium; Louisville, KY	**W** 4–3	Burdi (3–2)	Halstead (2–3)	None	3,530	39–10	
May 11	at Connecticut	No. 12	J. O. Christian Field; Storrs, CT	**W** 8–0	Green (8–2)	Cross (7–4)	None	107	40–10	15–4
May 11	at Connecticut	No. 12	J. O. Christian Field; Storrs, CT	**W** 6–0	Thompson (9–1)	Marzi (3–6)	None	88	41–10	16–4
May 12	at Connecticut	No. 12	J. O. Christian Field; Storrs, CT	**W** 3–1	Kime (5–1)	Tabakman (5–1)	**Burdi (11)**	245	42–10	17–4
May 14	at Ohio State	No. 12	Bill Davis Stadium; Columbus, OH	**W** 6–3	Funkhouser (4–1)	Giannonatii (0–3)	**Burdi (12)**	950	43–10	
May 16	No. 16 Pittsburgh	No. 12	Jim Patterson Stadium; Louisville, KY	**W** 5–2	Green (9–2)	Mildren (9–3)	**Burdi (13)**	2,171	44–10	18–4
May 17	No. 16 Pittsburgh	No. 12	Jim Patterson Stadium; Louisville, KY	**W** 12–4	Thompson (10–1)	Wotherspoon (9–2)	None	3,574	45–10	19–4
May 18	No. 16 Pittsburgh	No. 12	Jim Patterson Stadium; Louisville, KY	**W** 7–4	Ege (4–1)	Aldenhoven (8–1)	**Burdi (14)**	2,637	46–10	20–4

Postseason (5–4)

Big East Tournament (0–2)
Date	Opponent	Rank	Stadium Site	Score	Win	Loss	Save	Attendance	Overall record	BET Record
May 22	(8) Connecticut	No. 10 (1)	Bright House Field; Clearwater, FL	**L** 2–3^{12}	Mahoney (1–2)	**Burdi (3–3)**	Butler (3)	1,872	46–11	0–1
May 23	(5) Rutgers	No. 10 (1)	Bright House Field; Clearwater, FL	**L** 1–9	Law (6–5)	**Green (9–3)**	None	1,683	46–12	0–2

NCAA tournament Louisville Regional (3–0)
Date	Opponent	Rank	Stadium Site	Score	Win	Loss	Save	Attendance	Overall record	NCAAT record
May 31	(4) Bowling Green	No. 15 (1)	Jim Patterson Stadium; Louisville, KY	**W** 8–3	**Green (10–3)**	Frank (5–8)	None	2,650	47–12	1–0
June 1	(2) Miami (FL)	No. 15 (1)	Jim Patterson Stadium; Louisville, KY	**W** 6–4	**Funkhouser (5–1)**	Radziewski (9–3)	**Burdi (15)**	2,581	48–12	2–0
June 2	(3) Oklahoma State	No. 15 (1)	Jim Patterson Stadium; Louisville, KY	**W** 12–3	**Filomeno (1–0)**	Bevacqua (2–3)	None	4,374	49–12	3–0

NCAA tournament Nashville Super Regional (2–0)
Date	Opponent	Rank	Site/stadium	Score	Win	Loss	Save	Attendance	Overall record	NCAAT record
June 8	at No. 1 (2) Vanderbilt	No. 15	Hawkins Field; Nashville, TN	**W** 5–3	**Kime (6–1)**	Ziomek (11–3)	**Burdi (16)**	3,503	50–12	4–0
June 9	at No. 1 (2) Vanderbilt	No. 15	Hawkins Field; Nashville, TN	**W** 2–1	**Thompson (11–1)**	Beede (14–1)	**Ege (1)**	3,503	51–12	5–0

College World Series (0–2)
Date	Opponent	Site/stadium	Score	Win	Loss	Save	Attendance	Overall record	CWS record
June 15	#8 Indiana	TD Ameritrade Park • Omaha, NE	**L** 0–2	DeNato (10–2)	**Green (10–4)**	None	27,122	51–13	0–1
June 17	#3 Oregon State	TD Ameritrade Park • Omaha, NE	**L** 4–11	Wetzler (10–1)	**Thompson (11–2)**	None	18,980	51–14	0–2

*Denotes non–conference game • Schedule source • Rankings based on the teams' current ranking in the Baseball America poll

== Ranking movements ==
Ranking movements Legend: ██ Increase in ranking ██ Decrease in ranking
	Week																		
Poll	Pre	1	2	3	4	5	6	7	8	9	10	11	12	13	14	15	16	17	Final
Coaches'	25	25*	22	20	15	14	17	14	12	9	13	12	11	11	10	12			8
Baseball America	4	4	4	5	4	4	10	9	8	8	12	13	12	12	10	15			8
Collegiate Baseball^	22	26	23	19	14	13	18	12	11	8	12	11	10	10	8	8	8	4	8
NCBWA†	19	21	19	20	15	13	15	14	12	9	12	11	10	10	9	13	11		8

^ Collegiate Baseball ranked 40 teams in their preseason poll, but only ranked 30 teams weekly during the season.
† NCBWA ranks 30 teams in their preseason poll, but only ranks 25 teams weekly during the season.
* A new poll was not released for this week, so for comparison purposes, the previous week's ranking is inserted in this week's slot.
