= 2013 Kentucky Wildcats baseball team =

2013 season of University of Kentucky baseball team

2013 Kentucky Wildcats baseball
- Conference: Southeastern Conference
- Record: 30–25 (11–19 SEC)
- Head coach: Gary Henderson (5th season)
- Assistant coaches: Brian Green (5th season); Brad Bohannon (9th season); Keith Vorhoff (6th season)
- Home stadium: Cliff Hagan Stadium

2013 Southeastern Conference baseball standings
	Conf.				Overall
Team	W		L	PCT	W		L	PCT
Eastern
No. 9 Vanderbilt ^{x}‍†‍‍^{y}	26	–	3	.897	54	–	12	.818
No. 13 South Carolina ‍‍‍^{y}	17	–	12	.586	43	–	20	.683
Florida ‍‍‍^{y}	14	–	16	.467	29	–	30	.492
Kentucky ‍‍‍	11	–	19	.367	30	–	25	.545
Missouri ‍‍‍	10	–	20	.333	18	–	32	.360
Tennessee ‍‍‍	8	–	20	.286	22	–	30	.423
Georgia ‍‍‍	7	–	20	.259	21	–	32	.396
Western
No. 7 LSU ^{x}‍‍‡‍^{y}	23	–	7	.767	57	–	11	.838
No. 18 Arkansas ‍‍‍^{y}	18	–	11	.621	39	–	22	.639
No. 2 Mississippi State ‍‍‍^{y}	16	–	14	.533	51	–	20	.718
Ole Miss ‍‍‍^{y}	15	–	15	.500	38	–	24	.613
Alabama ‍‍‍^{y}	14	–	15	.483	35	–	28	.556
Texas A&M ‍‍‍^{y}	13	–	16	.448	34	–	29	.540
Auburn ‍‍‍	13	–	17	.433	33	–	23	.589
x – Division champion † – Conference champion ‡ – Tournament champion y – Invited to the NCAA tournament As of June 26, 2013; Rankings from Collegiate Baseball

The 2013 Kentucky Wildcats baseball team represented the University of Kentucky in the 2013 NCAA Division I baseball season. The Wildcats played their home games in Cliff Hagan Stadium. The team was coached by Gary Henderson, who was in his fifth season at Kentucky.

== Personnel ==
=== Roster ===
2013 Kentucky Wildcats baseball team
Players
Coaches

#	Pos.	Name	B/T	Height	Weight	Year	Previous school	Home town
2	OF	Zac Zellers	R/R	6 ft 0 in (1.83 m)	185 lb (84 kg)	Sr	Rockwood Summit	St. Louis, MO
3	INF	Andrew Bryant	R/R	5 ft 9 in (1.75 m)	170 lb (77 kg)	Fr	Tates Creek	Lexington, KY
4	INF	Paul McConkey	L/R	5 ft 11 in (1.8 m)	185 lb (84 kg)	Jr	Halls	Knoxville, TN
5	RHP	Trevor Gott	R/R	6 ft 0 in (1.83 m)	190 lb (86 kg)	So	Tates Creek	Lexington, KY
6	INF	Matt Reida	L/R	5 ft 11 in (1.8 m)	178 lb (81 kg)	RS Jr	Western	Russiaville, IN
7	OF	Lucas Witt	R/R	6 ft 1 in (1.85 m)	190 lb (86 kg)	Jr	Lexington Christian	Lexington, KY
8	RHP	Walter Wijas	R/R	6 ft 2 in (1.88 m)	215 lb (98 kg)	Sr	James B. Conant	Elk Grove Village, IL
9	INF	Max Kuhn	R/R	5 ft 11 in (1.8 m)	198 lb (90 kg)	So	Zionsville	Zionsville, IN
10	INF	J. T. Riddle	L/R	6 ft 3 in (1.91 m)	185 lb (84 kg)	Jr	Western Hills	Frankfort, KY
11	C	Russell Jacob	R/R	6 ft 4 in (1.93 m)	240 lb (109 kg)	So	Anderson County/Eastern Kentucky	Lawrenceburg, KY
12	LHP	Chase Mullins	L/L	6 ft 9 in (2.06 m)	280 lb (127 kg)	Fr	Bourbon County	Paris, KY
14	RHP	Chandler Shepherd	R/R	6 ft 2 in (1.88 m)	185 lb (84 kg)	So	Lawrence County	Louisa, KY
15	OF	Jeff Boehm	L/L	6 ft 1 in (1.85 m)	205 lb (93 kg)	So	Mount Carmel	Lansing, IL
16	INF	Zack Storm	R/R	6 ft 0 in (1.83 m)	200 lb (91 kg)	Fr	North Laurel	London, KY
17	RHP	Taylor Martin	R/R	6 ft 4 in (1.93 m)	200 lb (91 kg)	So	Lexington Catholic	Lexington, KY
18	LHP	A.J. Reed	L/L	6 ft 4 in (1.93 m)	245 lb (111 kg)	So	Terre Haute South	Terre Haute, IN
19	OF	Austin Cousino	L/L	5 ft 10 in (1.78 m)	180 lb (82 kg)	So	Dublin Coffman	Dublin, OH
21	LHP	Corey Littrell	L/L	6 ft 3 in (1.91 m)	195 lb (88 kg)	Jr	Trinity	Louisville, KY
22	RHP	Matt Pope	R/R	6 ft 7 in (2.01 m)	220 lb (100 kg)	Fr	Science Hill	Johnson City, TN
23	RHP	Kyle Cody	R/R	6 ft 7 in (2.01 m)	230 lb (104 kg)	Fr	McDonnell Central	Chippewa Falls, WI
24	LHP	Dylan Dwyer	L/L	6 ft 1 in (1.85 m)	170 lb (77 kg)	Fr	Calloway County	Murray, KY
25	LHP	Ryne Combs	L/L	6 ft 0 in (1.83 m)	185 lb (84 kg)	Fr	Bryan Station	Lexington, KY
26	LHP	Jerad Grundy	L/L	6 ft 1 in (1.85 m)	200 lb (91 kg)	Sr	Johnsburg	Johnsburg, IL
27	INF	Trace Vorbeck	R/R	6 ft 1 in (1.85 m)	195 lb (88 kg)	Fr	Corbin	Corbin, KY
28	RHP	Tyler Cox	R/R	5 ft 11 in (1.8 m)	180 lb (82 kg)	Fr	Dunbar	Lexington, KY
29	RHP	Zach Strecker	R/R	6 ft 4 in (1.93 m)	225 lb (102 kg)	Fr	Eastern	Louisville, KY
30	LHP	Sam Mahar	R/R	6 ft 1 in (1.85 m)	190 lb (86 kg)	So	Tremper	Kenosha, WI
34	INF	Thomas Weaver	R/R	6 ft 1 in (1.85 m)	175 lb (79 kg)	Fr	North Cross	Salem, VA
35	C	Zach Arnold	R/R	6 ft 2 in (1.88 m)	175 lb (79 kg)	Fr	Franklin County	Frankfort, KY
37	OF	Kyle Barrett	L/L	5 ft 11 in (1.8 m)	175 lb (79 kg)	Fr	Chapel Hill	Douglasville, GA
39	C	Casey Schroeder	S/R	6 ft 2 in (1.88 m)	190 lb (86 kg)	Fr	Ottawa-Glandorf	Glandorf, OH
40	C	Greg Fettes	R/R	6 ft 2 in (1.88 m)	225 lb (102 kg)	RS Fr	Lamphere	Madison Heights, MI
42	C	Michael Thomas	R/R	5 ft 11 in (1.8 m)	210 lb (95 kg)	RS Jr	Elizabethtown	Elizabethtown, KY
44	OF	Dorian Hairston	R/R	5 ft 11 in (1.8 m)	210 lb (95 kg)	Fr	Tates Creek	Lexington, KY
46	INF	Thomas Bernal	R/R	6 ft 0 in (1.83 m)	210 lb (95 kg)	RS So	Paso Robles	Paso Robles, CA
47	OF	Storm Wilson	S/R	5 ft 11 in (1.8 m)	185 lb (84 kg)	Fr	Somerset	Science Hill, KY

Head coach

Gary Henderson

Assistant coach(es)

Brad Bohannon
Brian Green
Keith Vorhoff

Legend

- (C) Team captain
- (S) Suspended
- (I) Ineligible
- Injured
- Current redshirt

Roster
Last update: March 26, 2013

== Schedule ==
2013 Kentucky Wildcats baseball game log
Regular season
February

#	Date	Opponent	Site/stadium	Score	Win	Loss	Save	Attendance	Overall record	SEC record
1	February 15	@UNC Asheville	Russell C. King Field	9–2	Reed (1–0)	Roland (0–1)	none		1–0	–
2	February 17	Niagara	Russell C. King Field	20–3	Grundy (2–0)	Kasper (0–1)	none		2–0	–
3	February 18	USC Upstate	Cleveland S. Harley Baseball Park	11–10	Gott (1–0)	Jeanot (0–1)	none	318	3–0	–
4	February 21	Kansas State	Pelicans Ballpark	5–7	MaVorhis (1–0)	Reed (1–1)	none		3–1	–
5	February 22	Elon	Pelicans Ballpark	6–1	Grundy (2–0)	Clark (1–1)	none		4–1	–
6	February 24	Coastal Carolina	Charles Watson Stadium	8–2	Gott (2–0)	Connolly (0–1)	none	854	5–1	–
7	February 26	Murray State	Cliff Hagan Stadium	11–5	Shepherd (1–0)	Vonder Haar (1–1)	none	1,416	6–1	–
8	February 27	Eastern Kentucky	Cliff Hagan Stadium	6–2	Wijas (1–0)	Westrick (0–1)	Gott (1)	1,447	7–1	–

March

#	Date	Opponent	Site/stadium	Score	Win	Loss	Save	Attendance	Overall record	SEC record
9	March 1	Akron	Cliff Hagan Stadium	21–2	Reed (2–1)	Pusateri (0–3)	none	1,435	8–1	–
10	March 2	Akron	Cliff Hagan Stadium	7–0	Grundy (3–0)	Valek (0–2)	none	1,472	9–1	–
11	March 3	Akron	Cliff Hagan Stadium	9–2	Littrell (1–0)	Brubaker (0–3)	none	1,456	10–1	–
12	March 6	Xavier	Cliff Hagan Stadium	6–3	Cody (1–0)	Klever (1–1)	Gott (2)	1,394	11–1	–
13	March 8	Michigan State	Cliff Hagan Stadium	2–1	Dwyer (1–0)	Misiewicz (1–1)	Gott (3)	1,624	12–1	–
14	March 9	Michigan State	Cliff Hagan Stadium	1–6	Garner (2–1)	Grundy (3–1)	none	1,830	12–2	–
15	March 10	Michigan State	Cliff Hagan Stadium	3–1	Littrell (2–0)	VanVossen (0–1)	Gott (4)	1,815	13–2	–
16	March 12	Ohio	Cliff Hagan Stadium	6–3	Strecker (1–0)	Kennedy (2–1)	Gott(5)	1,487	14–2	–
17	March 15	@Florida	Alfred A. McKethan Stadium	1–4	Harris (3–1)	Reed (2–2)	Magliozzi (4)	3,540	14–3	0–1
18	March 16	Florida	Alfred A. McKethan Stadium	11–5	Grundy (4–1)	Crawford (0–3)	Gott (6)	3,120	15–3	1–1
19	March 17	Florida	Alfred A. McKethan Stadium	6–2	Littrell (3–0)	Hanhold (0–2)	none	3,284	16–3	2–1
20	March 19	Western Kentucky	Cliff Hagan Stadium	3–6	Bartley (1–0)	Cody (1–1)	Taylor (3)	1,616	16–4	2–1
21	March 22	Mississippi State	Cliff Hagan Stadium	4–8	Mitchell (5–0)	Reed (2–3)	none	1,788	16–5	2–2
22	March 23	Mississippi State	Cliff Hagan Stadium	4–3	Wijas (2–0)	Girodo (2–1)	none	2,284	17–5	3–2
23	March 23	Mississippi State	Cliff Hagan Stadium	3–2	Grundy (5–1)	Graveman (2–2)	Gott (7)		18–5	4–2
24	March 27	Marshall	Cliff Hagan Stadium	8–2	Cody (2–0)	Margaritonda (0–4)	none	1,482	19–5	4–2
25	March 29	Georgia	Cliff Hagan Stadium	3–2^{10}	Gott (3–0)	Walsh (1–3)	none	2,069	20–5	5–2
26	March 30	Georgia	Cliff Hagan Stadium	6–7	Boling (2–3)	Grundy (5–2)	Cole (1)	2,233	20–6	5–3
27	March 31	Georgia	Cliff Hagan Stadium	5–0	Littrell (4–0)	Benzor (1–2)	none	1,604	21–6	6–3

April

#	Date	Opponent	Site/stadium	Score	Win	Loss	Save	Attendance	Overall record	SEC record
28	April 2	@Louisville	Jim Patterson Stadium	5–4^{10}	Gott (4–0)	Burdi (1–1)	none	4,733	22–6	6–3
29	April 5	@LSU	Alex Box Stadium	1–11	Nola (5–0)	Reed (2–4)	none	10,886	22–7	6–4
30	April 6	@LSU	Alex Box Stadium	1–9	Eades (7–0)	Grundy (5–3)	none	11,608	22–8	6–5
31	April 7	@LSU	Alex Box Stadium	4–11	Glenn (5–1)	Littrell (4–1)	none	10,971	22–9	6–6
32	April 9	Austin Peay	Cliff Hagan Stadium	6–3	Cody (3–1)	Hall (3–2)	Gott (8)	1,803	23–9	6–6
33	April 12	Tennessee	Cliff Hagan Stadium	5–4	Shepherd (2–0)	Saberhagen (0–2)	Gott (9)	2,049	24–9	7–6
34	April 13	Tennessee	Cliff Hagan Stadium	9–10	Williams (2–2)	Grundy (5–3)	Moberg (1)	2,726	24–10	7–7
35	April 14	Tennessee	Cliff Hagan Stadium	0–5	Godley (3–4)	Littrell (4–2)	none	2,162	24–11	7–8
36	April 16	Louisville	Cliff Hagan Stadium	5–12	Ege (3–1)	Cody (3–2)	none	3,589	24–12	7–8
37	April 20	@South Carolina	Carolina Stadium	2–5	Belcher (6–3)	Reed (2–5)	Westmoreland (3)	7,411	24–13	7–9
38	April 20	@South Carolina	Carolina Stadium	6–7^{11}	Webb (2–1)	Gott (4–1)	none	8,148	24–14	7–10
39	April 21	@South Carolina	Carolina Stadium	1–3	Wynkoop (5–2)	Littrell (4–3)	Webb (12)	8,024	24–15	7–11
40	April 23	@Western Kentucky	Nick Denes Field	3–2^{18}	Pearson (2–0)	Strecker (1–1)	none	3,571	24–16	7–11
41	April 25	@Ole Miss	Swayze Field	3–2	Shepherd (3–0)	Greenwood (3–2)	none	7,898	25–16	8–11
42	April 26	@Ole Miss	Swayze Field	5–11	Mayers (3–5)	Grundy (5–5)	none	7,676	25–17	8–12
43	April 27	@Ole Miss	Swayze Field	5–4	Littrell (5–3)	Denny (1–1)	Gott (10)	9,032	26–17	9–12

May

#	Date	Opponent	Site/stadium	Score	Win	Loss	Save	Attendance	Overall record	SEC record
44	May 3	Arkansas	Cliff Hagan Stadium	1–2	Astin (4–2)	Reed (2–6)	Suggs (9)	2,336	26–18	9–13
45	May 4	Arkansas	Cliff Hagan Stadium	3–5	Stanek (6–2)	Littrell (5–4)	Suggs (10)	1,794	26–19	9–14
46	May 4	Arkansas	Cliff Hagan Stadium	4–3	Shepherd (4–0)	Simpson (1–1)	none	1,794	27–19	10–14
47	May 7	Wright State	Cliff Hagan Stadium	4–1	Grundy (6–5)	Kopilchack (1–1)	Gott (11)	1,575	28–19	10–14
48	May 11	Vanderbilt	Cliff Hagan Stadium	3–11	Ziomek (10–2)	Reed (2–7)	Buehler (1)		28–20	10–15
49	May 11	Vanderbilt	Cliff Hagan Stadium	3–5	Beede (13–0)	Cody (3–3)	Miller (1)	2,529	28–21	10–16
50	May 12	Vanderbilt	Cliff Hagan Stadium	5–10	Rice (3–0)	Littrell (5–5)	none	1,961	28–22	10–17
51	May 14	Indiana	Cliff Hagan Stadium	5–3	Shepherd (5–0)	Harrison (4–2)	Gott (12)	2,046	29–22	10–17
52	May 16	@Missouri	Taylor Stadium	2–4	Graves (2–5)	Reed (2–8)	Steele (1)	654	29–23	10–18
53	May 17	@Missouri	Taylor Stadium	4–3	Walsh (2–1)	Wijas (2–1)	Steele (2)	850	29–24	10–19
54	May 18	@Missouri	Taylor Stadium	5–1	Littrell (6–5)	Miles (0–3)	none	886	30–24	11–19

Postseason
SEC Tournament

#	Date	Opponent	Site/stadium	Score	Win	Loss	Save	Attendance	Overall record	SECT record
55	May 21	Ole Miss	Regions Park	1–4	Mayers (5–5)	Grundy (6–6)	Bailey (4)		30–25	0–1

2013 Kentucky Wildcats Baseball Schedule

== Record vs. conference opponents ==
Last two do not qualify for conf. tourn. Blank are not scheduled. Blue are home games, otherwise away.

2013 SEC baseball records Source: 2013 SEC baseball game results, 2013 SEC baseball schedule
Team	W–L	ALA	ARK	AUB	FLA	UGA	KEN	LSU	MSU	MIZZ	MISS	SCAR	TENN	TAMU	VAN	Team	Div	SR	SW
ALA	14–15		1–2	2–1	.	3–0	.	1–2	0–3	2–1	0–3	.	2–1	2–0	1–2	ALA	W5	5–5	1–2
ARK	18–11	2–1		1–2	.	2–0	2–1	1–2	2–1	.	1–2	3–0	2–1	2–1	.	ARK	W2	7–3	1–0
AUB	13–17	1–2	2–1		2–1	2–1	.	0–3	1–2	1–2	2–1	.	.	2–1	0–3	AUB	W7	5–5	0–2
FLA	14–16	.	.	1–2		1–2	1–2	0–3	1–2	2–1	2–1	3–0	2–1	.	1–2	FLA	E3	4–6	1–1
UGA	7–20	0–3	0–2	1–2	2–1		1–2	.	.	1–2	.	0–3	1–0	0–3	1–2	UGA	E7	1–8	0–3
KEN	11–19	.	1–2	.	2–1	2–1		0–3	2–1	1–2	2–1	0–3	1–2	.	0–3	KEN	E4	4–6	0–3
LSU	23–7	2–1	2–1	3–0	3–0	.	3–0		2–1	3–0	2–1	1–2	.	2–1	.	LSU	W1	9–1	4–0
MSU	16–14	3–0	1–2	2–1	2–1	.	1–2	1–2		.	1–2	2–1	.	3–0	0–3	MSU	W3	5–5	2–1
MIZZ	10–20	1–2	.	2–1	1–2	2–1	2–1	0–3	.		.	1–2	1–2	0–3	0–3	MIZZ	E5	3–7	0–3
MISS	15–15	3–0	2–1	1–2	1–2	.	1–2	1–2	2–1	.		.	3–0	1–2	0–3	MISS	W4	4–6	2–1
SCAR	17–12	.	0–3	.	0–3	3–0	3–0	2–1	1–2	2–1	.		3–0	3–0	0–2	SCAR	E2	6–4	4–2
TENN	8–20	1–2	1–2	.	1–2	0–1	2–1	.	.	2–1	0–3	0–3		1–2	0–3	TENN	E6	2–7	0–3
TAMU	13–16	0–2	1–2	1–2	.	3–0	.	1–2	0–3	3–0	2–1	0–3	2–1		.	TAMU	W6	4–6	2–2
VAN	26–3	2–1	.	3–0	2–1	2–1	3–0	.	3–0	3–0	3–0	2–0	3–0	.		VAN	E1	10–0	6–0
Team	W–L	ALA	ARK	AUB	FLA	UGA	KEN	LSU	MSU	MIZZ	MISS	SCAR	TENN	TAMU	VAN	Team	Div	SR	SW

Updated for entire regular season.

== See also ==
- Kentucky Wildcats baseball
