= Sam Travis =

American baseball player (born 1993)

- Travis with the Boston Red Sox

Free agent
- First baseman
- Born: August 27, 1993 (age 33); Chicago, Illinois, U.S.
- Bats: Right Throws: Right

MLB debut
- May 24, 2017, for the Boston Red Sox

MLB statistics (through 2019 season)
- Batting average: .235
- Home runs: 7
- Runs batted in: 24
- Stats at Baseball Reference

Teams
- Boston Red Sox (2017–2019)

Samuel John Travis (born August 27, 1993) is an American professional baseball first baseman who is a free agent. He has previously played in Major League Baseball (MLB) for the Boston Red Sox. Listed at 6 feet 0 inches (1.83 m) and 205 pounds (93 kg), he bats and throws right-handed. Travis made his MLB debut in 2017. He is one of only a few players in MLB not to wear batting gloves.

== Amateur career ==
Travis attended Providence Catholic High School in New Lenox, Illinois, and Indiana University. Travis pursued a degree in general studies. In his third season with the Indiana Hoosiers, Travis earned the 2013 Big Ten Most Outstanding Player of the Year honors after hitting a slash line of .347/.415/.576 in 59 games, including 16 doubles, two triples and 12 home runs, while scoring 55 times and driving in 58 runs, the most in the Big Ten Conference.

Travis also played for the Yarmouth–Dennis Red Sox in the Cape Cod Baseball League after claiming Big Ten Conference Freshman of the Year honors in the summer of 2012, when he finished with a sixth-best average of .339 and seventh-best OBP of .415, while adding 12 doubles, four homers and 35 RBIs. A Cape League All-Star, he was named to the All-League team at the end of the summer. Additionally, he won the Chicago Tribune Illinois Player of the Year distinction in 2011 and was on United States national baseball team in 2013.

In his college tenure, Travis had a walk-to-strikeout ratio of 93 walks and 94 strikeouts in 721 plate appearances (7.67 PA/SO).

== Professional career ==
=== Boston Red Sox ===
The Boston Red Sox selected Travis in the second round (67th overall pick) of the 2014 MLB draft, signing him for $846,800. Travis moved quickly through Boston's farm system, reaching his fourth level in under a calendar year.

Travis started his professional career with the Low-A Lowell Spinners in their 2014 season. He had a slash line of .333/.364/.448 in 40 games for Lowell, including four home runs, 17 doubles, 28 runs scored and 30 RBIs. He then was promoted to the Single-A Greenville Drive, where hit .290/.330/.495 with 12 runs and 14 RBIs in 27 games.

Travis opened 2015 with the High-A Salem Red Sox, where he blossomed and quickly earned a promotion to Double-A Portland Sea Dogs after 66 games. In 131 games between the two teams, Travis hit .307/.381/.452 with 32 doubles, six triples, nine homers and 78 RBIs, and was named to the Carolina League All-Star team. After that, Travis played in the Arizona Fall League, batting .344/.394/.505 in 23 games for the Scottsdale Scorpions and earning an All-Star berth.

In 2016, Travis was invited to participate in the Red Sox' spring training. He batted .536 (15-for-28), with two home runs and two doubles while driving in a team-leading 13 runs. He then was promoted to the Triple-A Pawtucket Red Sox to start the regular season. In May, Travis suffered a torn ACL in his left knee and was out for the remainder of the season after undergoing surgery. At the time of the injury, Travis was leading the International League with 29 RBIs while hitting .272 with a .756 OPS. He was expected to be ready for the 2017 season.

Travis started the 2017 season with Triple-A Pawtucket, where he would ultimately appear in 82 games while batting .270 with six home runs and 24 RBIs, when not on Boston's active MLB roster.

==== 2017 ====
The Red Sox promoted Travis to MLB on May 23, 2017. He had his first MLB hit the next day, off of Martín Pérez of the Texas Rangers. Travis was optioned back to Pawtucket on June 9, and recalled to Boston on June 20; in the Red Sox' game against the Kansas City Royals that day, Travis had his first major league RBI. He was sent back to Triple-A in mid-July, then rejoined Boston at the start of September.

Overall for the 2017 season, Travis appeared in 33 MLB games, batting 20-for-76 (.263) with no home runs and one RBI. Defensively, he played 140 innings at first base (21 games with 17 starts) with a single error. Travis was not included on Boston's postseason roster for the 2017 American League Division Series.

Travis played in the Dominican Winter League during their 2017–18 season for Gigantes del Cibao, batting 5-for-32 (.156) in ten games.

==== 2018 ====
The Red Sox optioned Travis to Triple-A Pawtucket to start the 2018 season, noting that he would play some games in left field and some games at first base. Travis was placed on the minor league disabled list in early May with a left intercostal strain; he later went on a rehabilitation assignment at extended spring training. Travis was with Boston from June 2 until June 11, while Mookie Betts was on the disabled list. During that time, Travis went 2-for-12 with three RBIs in four appearances. Travis was next recalled to Boston on July 13, went 1-for-4 in that day's game, and was returned to Triple-A on July 16. Travis was called up to Boston on September 1, when rosters expanded. He hit his first major league home run on September 21, against Shane Bieber of the Cleveland Indians. Overall with the 2018 Red Sox, Travis appeared in 19 games, batting 8-for-36 (.222) with one home run and seven RBIs. He was not included on Boston's postseason roster.

==== 2019 ====
Travis was included on Boston's 2019 Opening Day roster, as Steve Pearce started the season on the 10-day injured list due to a left calf injury. Travis appeared in two games, batting 2-for-7 (.286) at the plate, before being sent to Triple-A Pawtucket on April 4. On June 1, Travis was recalled to Boston when Pearce was again placed on the injured list, and optioned back to Pawtucket on June 14. For the 2019 MLB London Series at the end of June, Travis was added to Boston's roster as the extra (26th) player allowed by MLB. Travis was recalled to Boston on July 15, when Eduardo Núñez was designated for assignment. Travis appeared in 59 games with the 2019 Red Sox, batting .215 with six home runs and 16 RBIs. After the season, Travis played in the Puerto Rican Winter League.

==== 2020 ====
On January 2, 2020, Travis was designated for assignment by the Red Sox. He cleared waivers, and was sent outright to the Triple-A Pawtucket Red Sox.

=== Texas Rangers ===
On January 15, 2020, Travis was traded to the Texas Rangers in exchange for pitcher Jeffrey Springs. He did not play in a game in 2020 due to the cancellation of the minor league season because of the COVID-19 pandemic. Travis was released by the Rangers organization on September 2, 2020.

=== Seattle Mariners ===
On December 3, 2020, Travis signed a minor league contract with the Seattle Mariners organization. Travis spent the 2021 season with the Triple-A Tacoma Rainiers, appearing in 71 games and hitting .256/.312/.444 with 11 home runs and 41 RBI.

=== Long Island Ducks ===
On April 11, 2022, Travis signed with the Long Island Ducks of the Atlantic League of Professional Baseball. He made 83 appearances for the Ducks in 2022, slashing .310/.368/.452 with 9 home runs and 68 RBI.

On March 31, 2023, Travis re-signed with the Ducks for the 2023 season. In 127 games for Long Island, he hit .303/.364/.485 with 19 home runs and 92 RBI.

=== Olmecas de Tabasco ===
On January 23, 2024, Travis signed with the Olmecas de Tabasco of the Mexican League. In 11 games, he batted .270/.357/.351 with 10 hits and 2 RBI.

=== Bravos de León ===
On April 30, 2024, Travis's rights were traded to the Bravos de León of the Mexican League. In 17 games for León, Travis batted .400/.463/.514 with no home runs and eight RBI.

=== Caliente de Durango ===
On May 20, 2024, Travis and Robbie Glendinning were traded to the Caliente de Durango in exchange for Alberth Martínez. In 57 appearances for Durango, he batted .348/.431/.476 with four home runs, 37 RBI, and three stolen bases. Travis was released by the Caliente on February 21, 2025.
