= Aaron Slegers =

American baseball pitcher (born 1992)

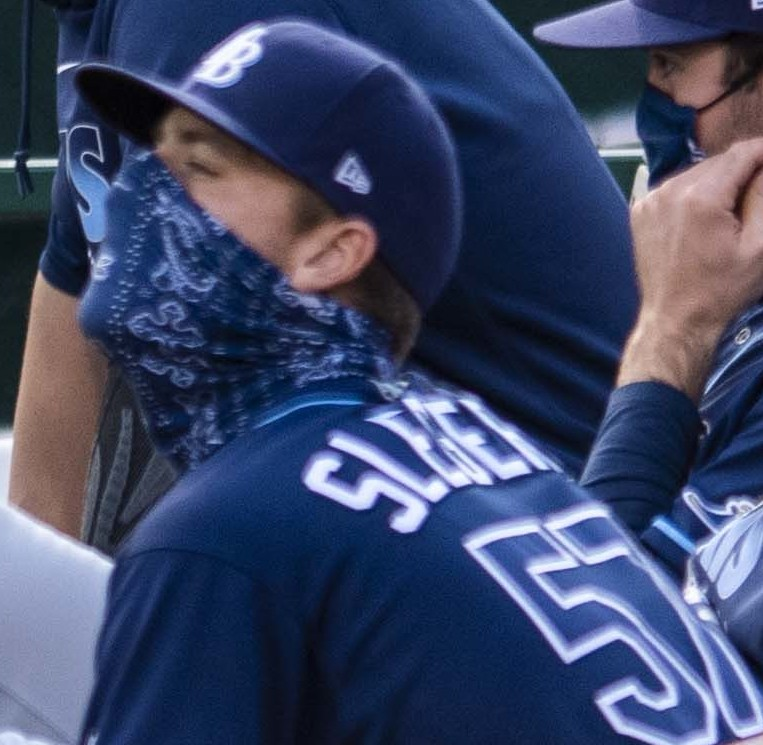
- Slegers with the Rays in 2020
- Pitcher
- Born: September 4, 1992 (age 34); Long Beach, California, U.S.
- Batted: Right Threw: Right

MLB debut
- August 17, 2017, for the Minnesota Twins

Last MLB appearance
- August 19, 2021, for the Los Angeles Angels

MLB statistics
- Win–loss record: 3–4
- Earned run average: 5.46
- Strikeouts: 59
- Stats at Baseball Reference

Teams
- Minnesota Twins (2017–2018); Tampa Bay Rays (2019–2020); Los Angeles Angels (2021)

Aaron Allan Slegers (born September 4, 1992) is an American former professional baseball pitcher. He played college baseball at Indiana University Bloomington for the Indiana Hoosiers and in Major League Baseball (MLB) for the Minnesota Twins, Tampa Bay Rays, and Los Angeles Angels.

== Career ==
=== Amateur career ===
Slegers attended Notre Dame Preparatory High School in Scottsdale, Arizona. He pitched for the school's baseball team, spending most of his junior year on the junior varsity team. He underwent a growth spurt between his junior and senior years, increasing from 6 feet 2 inches (1.88 m) to 6 feet 9 inches (2.06 m), and resulting arm pain as his bones grew faster than his tendons, limiting him to only two innings pitched in his senior year.

Slegers enrolled at Indiana University Bloomington, where he made the Indiana Hoosiers baseball team as a walk-on. He threw one inning before he suffered a broken wrist when hit by a line drive. The next year, he had a stress fracture in his right tibia. His injuries limited him to throwing 8 1/3 total innings in his freshman and sophomore years. In 2013, his junior year, Slegers helped Indiana win the Big Ten Conference's regular-season championship and the conference tournament, and Indiana appeared in the 2013 NCAA Division I baseball tournament. He was named the Big Ten Conference Baseball Pitcher of the Year after going 9–2 with a 2.04 ERA.

=== Minnesota Twins ===
The Minnesota Twins selected Slegers in the fifth round of the 2013 Major League Baseball draft. He signed with the Twins, receiving a $380,000 signing bonus. He made his professional debut that year with the Elizabethton Twins of the Rookie-level Appalachian League, compiling a 0.47 ERA in 19 innings pitched. He began the 2014 season with the Cedar Rapids Kernels of the Single–A Midwest League, and was promoted to the Fort Myers Miracle of the High–A Florida State League in July. In 23 total starts between both clubs, he pitched to a combined 9–8 record with a 4.53 ERA. He returned to Fort Myers in 2015, and after pitching to an 8–6 record and a 2.87 ERA in 19 starts, he was promoted to the Chattanooga Lookouts of the Double–A Southern League in August. In six starts for the Lookouts, he was 1–4 with a 4.91 ERA. He pitched for Chattanooga in 2016 and compiled a 10–7 record with a 3.41 ERA in 25 starts.

The Twins invited him to spring training as a non-roster player in 2017. He began the season with the Rochester Red Wings of the Triple–A International League.

On August 17, 2017, Slegers made his major league debut for the Twins. He was optioned back to Rochester the next day, and was recalled on September 4. In 24 starts for Rochester he was 15–4 with a 3.40 ERA, and in four games (three starts) for Minnesota, he was 0–1 with a 6.46 ERA. Slegers began 2018 with Rochester and was recalled by the Twins on April 26.

Slegers was designated for assignment on January 3, 2019.

=== Pittsburgh Pirates ===
On January 11, 2019, Slegers was claimed off waivers by the Pittsburgh Pirates. Slegers was designated for assignment on March 28, after the contracts of Melky Cabrera, Francisco Liriano, and J. B. Shuck were selected.

=== Tampa Bay Rays ===
On March 30, 2019, Slegers was traded to the Tampa Bay Rays in exchange for cash considerations. On May 16, Slegers was designated for assignment by the Rays without appearing in an MLB game for them. On August 21, the Rays selected his contract. On September 2, Slegers was designated for assignment. He elected free agency on October 1, but later re-signed with the Rays on a minor league deal in the offseason. On June 28, 2020, Tampa Bay named Slegers to the Port Charlotte team as part of their 60-man roster for the shortened 2020 season. On August 12, Slegers was selected to the active roster. In 2020, Slegers recorded a 3.46 ERA in 11 regular season appearances, and pitched to a strong 1.80 ERA in five innings across three playoff games.

=== Los Angeles Angels ===
On February 8, 2021, the Rays traded Slegers to the Los Angeles Angels in exchange for a player to be named later. Slegers appeared in 29 games for the Angels, struggling to a 6.97 ERA with 25 strikeouts. On August 28, Slegers was sent outright to the Triple-A Salt Lake Bees, however elected free agency the next day.

=== Tampa Bay Rays (second stint) ===
On August 31, 2021, Slegers signed a two-year minor league deal with the Tampa Bay Rays. He made two appearances for the Triple–A Durham Bulls to finish the year. In 2022, he made two scoreless appearances for the rookie–level Florida Complex League Rays, missing the majority of the season due to injury. Slegers elected free agency following the season on November 10, 2022.

On January 19, 2023, Slegers announced his retirement from baseball due to continuing shoulder injury problems.

== Personal life ==
In his professional career Slegers was listed at 6 feet 10 inches (2.08 m) and 260 pounds (120 kg), making him one of the tallest players in MLB history. Slegers' father, Robert, is 7 feet (2.1 m) tall, while his mother, Christie, is 5 feet 11 inches (1.80 m). His older sister, Rebecca, played volleyball at Lehigh University.
