= 2013 NCAA Division I baseball rankings =

2013 NCAA Division I baseball season
- Duration: February 15, 2013–June 26, 2013
- Number of teams: 298
- Preseason No. 1: Arkansas (CB, Coaches, NCBWA); North Carolina (BA)

Tournament
- Duration: June 1–26, 2013
- Most conference bids: SEC (9)

College World Series
- Champions: UCLA (1st title)
- Runners-up: Mississippi State
- MOP: Adam Plutko (UCLA)

Seasons
- ← 2012 2014 →

The following human polls make up the 2013 NCAA Division I men's baseball rankings. The USA Today/ESPN Coaches Poll is voted on by a panel of 31 Division I baseball coaches. The Baseball America poll is voted on by staff members of the Baseball America magazine. These polls rank the top 25 teams nationally. Collegiate Baseball and the National Collegiate Baseball Writers Association rank the top 30 teams nationally.

== Legend ==
| | Increase in ranking |
| | Decrease in ranking |
| | Not ranked previous week |
| Italics | Number of first place votes |
| (#-#) | Win–loss record |
| т | Tied with team above or below also with this symbol |

== ESPN/USA Today Coaches' Poll ==
| | Preseason Jan 24 | Week 1 Feb 25 | Week 2 Mar 4 | Week 3 Mar 11 | Week 4 Mar 18 | Week 5 Mar 25 | Week 6 Apr 1 | Week 7 Apr 8 | Week 8 Apr 15 | Week 9 Apr 22 | Week 10 Apr 29 | Week 11 May 6 | Week 12 May 13 | Week 13 May 20 | Week 14 May 27 | Week 15 June 26 | |
|---|---|---|---|---|---|---|---|---|---|---|---|---|---|---|---|---|---|
| 1. | Arkansas 10 | North Carolina (6–0) | North Carolina (10–0) 28 | North Carolina (14–0) | North Carolina (18–1) | North Carolina (21–1) 30 | North Carolina (24–1) 31 | North Carolina (29–2) 24 | North Carolina (34–2) 29 | North Carolina (39–2) 31 | North Carolina (41–4) 20 | North Carolina (42–4) 15 | Vanderbilt (45–6) 30 | Vanderbilt (48–7) 31 | LSU (52–9) 27 | UCLA (49–17) 31 | 1. |
| 2. | UCLA 4 | Arkansas (7–0) | Vanderbilt (12–1) | LSU (15–1) | Vanderbilt (19–2) | LSU (22–2) | LSU (26–2) | LSU (30–2) 7 | LSU (34–3) 1 | LSU (37–4) | Vanderbilt (39–6) 11 | Vanderbilt (41–6) 15 | North Carolina (45–6) 1 | LSU (48–8) | Vanderbilt (51–9) 3 | Mississippi State (51–20) | 2. |
| 3. | LSU 3 | Vanderbilt (7–1) | LSU (10–1) | Vanderbilt (15–2) | LSU (18–2) | Oregon State (21–2) 1 | Vanderbilt (25–4) | Vanderbilt (29–4) | Vanderbilt (33–4) 1 | Cal State Fullerton (34–6) | LSU (39–6) | LSU (43–6) 1 | LSU (45–7) | Oregon State (43–9) | North Carolina (52–8) 1 | North Carolina (59–12) | 3. |
| 4. | North Carolina 4 | LSU (6–1) | Oregon State (11–0) 1 | Oregon State (14–0) | Oregon State (19–1) | Florida State (22–2) 1 | Cal State Fullerton (24–4) | Cal State Fullerton (28–4) | Cal State Fullerton (31–5) | Vanderbilt (35–6) | Cal State Fullerton (36–7) | Cal State Fullerton (39–7) | Oregon State (41–8) | Cal State Fullerton (45–8) | Cal State Fullerton (48–8) | Oregon State (52–13) | 4. |
| 5. | South Carolina | Oregon State (8–0) | Florida State (10–0) | Florida State (15–0) | Florida State (18–1) | Vanderbilt (21–4) | Florida State (24–4) | Virginia (29–3) | Oregon State (28–6) | Virginia (35–6) | Oregon State (34–8) | Oregon State (37–8) | Cal State Fullerton (41–8) | North Carolina (47–8) | Oregon State (45–10) | NC State (50–16) | 5. |
| 6. | Oregon | Florida State (7–0) | Mississippi State (14–0) | South Carolina (13–2) | South Carolina (17–3) | Cal State Fullerton (21–3) | Oregon State (22–4) | Oregon State (25–5) | Florida State (30–6) | Oregon State (30–8) | Oregon (33–10) | Oregon (37–11) | Oregon (40–11) | Virginia (45–9) | Virginia (47–10) | LSU (57–11) | 6. |
| 7. | Stanford 1 | Oregon (6–1) | South Carolina (8–2) | UCLA (16–1) | UCLA (15–3) | UCLA (17–4) | Oregon (22–6) | Florida State (27–5) | Oregon (27–8) | Oregon (29–10) | Virginia (38–8) | Florida State (38–9) | Virginia (42–8) | Florida State (44–11) | Oregon (45–14) | Indiana (49–16) | 7. |
| 8. | Vanderbilt 2 | South Carolina (5–1) | Cal State Fullerton (10–1) | Ole Miss (16–1) | Ole Miss (20–2) | Virginia (22–2) | Virginia (25–3) | South Carolina (26–7) | Virginia (31–6) | UCLA (25–11) | Florida State (35–9) | Virginia (39–8) | Florida State (41–10) | Oregon (43–13) | NC State (44–14) | Louisville (51–14) | 8. |
| 9. | Florida State 3 | Cal State Fullerton (8–0) | UCLA (8–2) | Cal State Fullerton (13–3) | Cal State Fullerton (16–3) | Oregon (18–6) | Kentucky (21–6) | Oregon (23–8) | Louisville (28–7) | Florida State (31–9) | South Carolina (33–12) | NC State (37–11) | NC State (39–12) | NC State (42–13) | Florida State (44–15) | Vanderbilt (54–12) | 9. |
| 10. | Arizona 3 | Arizona (7–1) | Stanford (9–2) | Kentucky (13–2) | Kentucky (16–3) | Kentucky (18–5) | UCLA (18–6) | Oklahoma (27–6) т | Mississippi State (30–9) | South Carolina (31–10) | NC State (34–11) | UCLA (31–13) | UCLA (34–14) | Louisville (46–10) | UCLA (39–17) | Cal State Fullerton (51–10) | 10. |
| 11. | NC State | UCLA (4–2) | Kentucky (10–1) | Mississippi State (17–2) | Georgia Tech (17–2) | Ole Miss (21–4) | South Carolina (22–6) | Arkansas (23–9) т | UCLA (22–10) | NC State (32–10) | UCLA (27–13) | Louisville (37–10) | Louisville (42–10) | UCLA (37–15) | Mississippi State (43–17) | Virginia (50–12) | 11. |
| 12. | TCU | Oklahoma (9–0) | Oklahoma (11–1) | Georgia Tech (14–2) | Oregon (15–6) | Oklahoma (22–4) | Arkansas (21–8) | Louisville (25–6) | Arkansas (25–12) | Mississippi State (32–10) | Louisville (33–10) | South Carolina (33–14) | South Carolina (37–14) | South Carolina (39–16) | Louisville (46–12) | South Carolina (43–20) | 12. |
| 13. | Florida 1 | Mississippi State (9–0) | Oregon (8–3) | Virginia (14–1) | Virginia (17–2) | Arkansas (17–7) | Oklahoma (25–5) | UCLA (19–9) | Oklahoma (28–8) | Louisville (30–9) | Oklahoma (33–11) | Mississippi State (36–13) | Arkansas (34–17) | Mississippi State (40–16) | Indiana (43–14) | Florida State (47–17) | 13. |
| 14. | Oregon State | Rice (5–2) | NC State (10–1) | Oregon (11–5) | Louisville (16–2) | South Carolina (18–6) | Louisville (22–5) | Kentucky (22–9) | South Carolina (27–10) | Oklahoma (31–10) | Arkansas (29–15) | Arkansas (32–16) | Ole Miss (35–17) | Oklahoma State (39–14) | South Carolina (39–18) | Kansas State (45–19) | 14. |
| 15. | Kentucky | Kentucky (5–1) | Ole Miss (11–1) | Arkansas (11–5) т | Mississippi State (19–4) | Georgia Tech (18–5) | Georgia Tech (21–6) | Indiana (25–4) | Georgia Tech (26–10) | Arkansas (27–15) | Mississippi State (33–13) | Oklahoma (34–14) | Arizona State (32–15–1) | Arkansas (35–19) | Arkansas (37–20) | Oregon (48–16) | 15. |
| 16. | Oklahoma | Stanford (5–2) | Arizona (10–3) | Louisville (12–2) т | Oklahoma (17–4) | Mississippi State (21–6) | Ole Miss (23–6) | Mississippi State (26–9) | NC State (28–10) | Ole Miss (29–12) | Arizona state (28–12–1) | Indiana (35–9) | Mississippi State (37–15) | Indiana (40–13) | Rice (41–17) | Rice (44–20) | 16. |
| 17. | Rice | Ole Miss (7–0) | Virginia (10–0) | Oklahoma (12–4) | Arkansas (14–7) | Louisville (19–4) | Mississippi State (23–8) | Georgia Tech (23–9) | Ole Miss (26–10) | Arizona State (24–12–1) | Indiana (34–8) | Arizona State (30–14–1) | Indiana (38–11) | Kansas State (39–16) | Kansas State (41–17) | Oklahoma (43–21) | 17. |
| 18. | Mississippi State т | NC State (5–1) | Georgia Tech (10–1) | Arizona State (10–2–1) т | NC State (16–5) | Oklahoma State (19–4) | Indiana (22–3) | Ole Miss (23–9) | Arizona State (22–10–1) | Indiana (29–8) | Ole Miss (31–14) | Rice (31–15) | Oklahoma State (36–13) | Clemson (39–17) | Oklahoma (40–19) | Arkansas (39–22) | 18. |
| 19. | San Diego т | Virginia (7–0) | Arkansas (7–5) | Stanford (10–5) т | Stanford (10–5) | Houston (21–4) | Oklahoma State (21–6) | Arizona State (19–9–1) | Kentucky (24–11) | Georgia Tech (27–13) | Oklahoma State (32–11) | Oklahoma State (34–12) | Clemson (37–15) | Arizona State (34–17–1) | Oklahoma State (39–17) | Arizona State (37–22–1) | 19. |
| 20. | Arizona State | Georgia Tech (6–1) | Louisville (9–2) | Arizona (13–5) | Oklahoma State (17–3) | Rice (18–8) | Houston (23–6) | Rice (23–11) | Indiana (26–7) | Rice (28–14) | UC Irvine (28–12) | Ole Miss (33–16) | Oklahoma (35–16) | Rice (31–17) | Arizona State (35–20–1) | Virginia Tech (40–22) | 20. |
| 21. | Georgia Tech | Miami (FL) (7–0) | Arizona State (7–2–1) | NC State (12–4) | Arizona State (12–4–1) | Notre Dame (14–6) | Cal Poly (20–6) | NC State (24–10) | UC Irvine (23–9) | UC Irvine (35–11) | Rice (28–14) | Stanford (26–16) | Kansas State (35–17) | Ole Miss (36–20) | Cal Poly (39–17) | Oklahoma State (41–19) | 21. |
| 22. | Cal State Fullerton | Louisville (6–1) | UC Irvine (10–2) | Notre Dame (10–3) | Notre Dame (12–2) | UC Irvine (15–5) | Rice (20–10) | Oklahoma State (22–8) | Cal Poly (24–9) | Stanford (22–12) | Clemson (30–14) | Clemson (30–15) | Rice (33–17) | Cal Poly (37–16) | Virginia Tech (38–20) | Florida Atlantic (42–22) | 22. |
| 23. | Baylor | Texas (6–1) | Rice (6–5) | Cal Poly (13–2) | UC-Irvine (15–5) | Indiana (18–3) | Arizona State (15–8–1) | UC Irvine (20–8) | Rice (25–13) | Cal Poly (26–11) | Kentucky (26–17) | UC Irvine (29–15) | Pittsburgh (40–11) | Mercer (42–14) | Ole Miss (37–22) | Georgia Tech (37–27) | 23. |
| 24. | Texas A&M | UC Irvine (6–1) | Miami (FL) (10–2) | Oklahoma State (12–3) | Central Arkansas (17–3) | Stanford (11–7) | Notre Dame (15–9) | Notre Dame (19–10) | Clemson (26–11) | Kentucky (24–15) | Georgia Tech (28–16) | Cal Poly (31–14) | South Alabama (39–14) | Oklahoma (36–19) | Clemson (39–20) | Cal Poly (40–19) | 24. |
| 25. | Virginia т; Louisville т | Arizona State (4–2) | Cal Poly (9–1) | UC Irvine (12–4) | Cal Poly (15–4) | Cal Poly (17–5) | Stanford (13–9) т; NC State (19–10) т | Cal Poly (21–8) | Arizona (23–12) | Oklahoma State (27–11) | Stanford (23–15) | South Alabama (36–13) | UC Irvine (31–16) | Campbell (46–9) | Campbell (49–10) | Clemson (40–22) | 25. |
| | Preseason Jan 24 | Week 1 Feb 25 | Week 2 Mar 4 | Week 3 Mar 11 | Week 4 Mar 18 | Week 5 Mar 25 | Week 6 Apr 1 | Week 7 Apr 8 | Week 8 Apr 15 | Week 9 Apr 22 | Week 10 Apr 29 | Week 11 May 6 | Week 12 May 13 | Week 13 May 20 | Week 14 May 27 | Week 15 June 26 | |
| | | Dropped: 12 TCU; 13 Florida; 19 San Diego; 23 Baylor; 24 Texas A&M | Dropped: 23 Texas | Dropped: 23 Rice; 24 Miami (FL) | Dropped: 20 Arizona; 23 Texas; 24 Miami | Dropped: 18 NC State; 21 Arizona State; 24 Central Arkansas | Dropped: 22 UC Irvine | Dropped: 20 Houston; 25 Stanford | Dropped: 22 Oklahoma State; 24 Notre Dame | Dropped: 24 Clemson; 25 Arizona | Dropped: 23 Cal Poly; 25 Arizona | Dropped: 23 Kentucky; 24 Georgia Tech | Dropped: 21 Stanford; 24 Cal Poly | Dropped: 23 Pittsburgh; 24 South Alabama; 25 UC Irvine | Dropped: 23 Mercer | Dropped: 23 Ole Miss; 25 Campbell | |

== Baseball America ==
| | Preseason Jan 24 | Week 1 Feb 18 | Week 2 Feb 25 | Week 3 Mar 4 | Week 4 Mar 11 | Week 5 Mar 18 | Week 6 Mar 25 | Week 7 Apr 1 | Week 8 Apr 8 | Week 9 Apr 15 | Week 10 Apr 22 | Week 11 Apr 29 | Week 12 May 6 | Week 13 May 13 | Week 14 May 20 | Week 15 May 27 | Week 16 June 27 | Week 17 | Week 18 | Week 19 | |
|---|---|---|---|---|---|---|---|---|---|---|---|---|---|---|---|---|---|---|---|---|---|
| 1. | North Carolina | North Carolina (2–0) | North Carolina (6–0) | North Carolina (10–0) | North Carolina (14–2) | North Carolina (18–1) | North Carolina (21–1) | North Carolina (24–1) | North Carolina (29–2) | North Carolina (34–2) | North Carolina (39–2) | North Carolina (41–4) | North Carolina (42–4) | Vanderbilt (45–6) | Vanderbilt (48–7) | Vanderbilt (51–9) | UCLA (49–17) | | | | 1. |
| 2. | Vanderbilt | Vanderbilt (2–1) | Vanderbilt (7–1) | Vanderbilt (12–1) | Vanderbilt (15–2) | Vanderbilt (19–2) | Oregon State (21–2) | Vanderbilt (25–4) | Vanderbilt (29–4) | Vanderbilt (33–4) | LSU (37–4) | Vanderbilt (39–6) | Vanderbilt (41–6) | LSU (45–7) | LSU (48–8) | LSU (52–9) | Mississippi State (51–20) | | | | 2. |
| 3. | Arkansas | Arkansas (2–1) | Arkansas (7–1) | Mississippi State (15–0) | Oregon State (15–0) | Oregon State (19–1) | Vanderbilt (21–4) | LSU (26–2) | LSU (30–2) | LSU (34–3) | Vanderbilt (35–6) | LSU (39–6) | LSU (43–6) | North Carolina (45–6) | Cal State Fullerton (45–8) | Cal State Fullerton (48–8) | North Carolina (59–12) | | | | 3. |
| 4. | Louisville | Louisville (2–1) | Louisville (6–1) | Oregon State (12–0) | Louisville (12–2) | Louisville (16–2) | LSU (22–2) | Cal State Fullerton (24–4) | Cal State Fullerton (28–4) | Cal State Fullerton (31–5) | Cal State Fullerton (34–6) | Cal State Fullerton (36–7) | Cal State Fullerton (39–7) | Cal State Fullerton (41–8) | Oregon State (43–9) | Oregon State (45–10) | Oregon State (52–13) | | | | 4. |
| 5. | Mississippi State | Mississippi State (4–0) | Mississippi State (9–0) | Louisville (9–2) | South Carolina (13–2) | South Carolina (17–3) | Cal State Fullerton (21–3) | Virginia (25–3) | Virginia (29–3) | Oregon State (28–6) | Virginia (35–6) | NC State (34–11) | NC State (37–11) | NC State (39–120) | Virginia (45–) | North Carolina (52–8) | LSU (57–11) | | | | 5. |
| 6. | Oregon State | Oregon State (3–0) | Oregon State (8–0) | South Carolina (8–2) | Mississippi (16–1) | Mississippi (20–2) | Florida State (22–2) | Oregon State (22–4) | Oregon State (25–5) | Florida State (30–6) | NC State (32–10) | Oregon State (34–8) | Oregon State (37–8) | Oregon State (41–8) | North Carolina (47–8) | Virginia (47–10) | NC State (50–16) | | | | 6. |
| 7. | South Carolina | South Carolina (2–1) | South Carolina (5–1) | Ole Miss (11–1) | Louisiana State (15–1) | Louisiana State (18–2) | UCLA (17–4) | Kentucky (21–6) | Florida State (27–5) | Virginia (31–6) | Oregon State (30–8) | Virginia (38–8) | Virginia (39–8) | Virginia (42–8) | Florida State (44–11) | NC State (44–14) | Indiana (49–16) | | | | 7. |
| 8. | NC State | Ole Miss (3–0) | Ole Miss (7–0) | LSU (10–1) | Cal State Fullerton (13–3) | Cal State Fullerton (16–3) | Kentucky (18–5) | Florida State (24–4) | Louisville (25–6) | Louisville (28–7) | Arizona State (24–12) | Arizona State (28–12) | UCLA (31–13) | UCLA (34–14) | UCLA (37–15) | Indiana (43–14) | Louisville (51–14) | | | | 8. |
| 9. | Stanford | LSU (3–0) | LSU (6–1) | NC State (10–1) | Georgia Tech (14–2) | Georgia Tech (17–2) | Virginia (22–2) | Louisville (22–5) | Oklahoma (27–6) | Arizona State (22–10) | UCLA (25–11) | UCLA (27–13) | Florida State (38–9) | Florida State (41–10) | NC State (42–13) | Oregon (45–14) | Vanderbilt (54–12) | | | | 9. |
| 10. | LSU | NC State (0–1) | NC State (5–1) | Cal State Fullerton (10–1) | Kentucky (13–2) | Kentucky (16–3) | Louisville (19–4) | UCLA (18–6) | Arkansas (23–9) | Oregon (27–8) | Florida State (31–9) | Florida State (35–9) | Oregon (37–11) | Oregon (40–11) | Louisville (46–10) | UCLA (39–17) | Cal State Fullerton (51–10) | | | | 10. |
| 11. | Kentucky | Kentucky (2–0) | Kentucky (5–1) | Kentucky (10–1) | UCLA (11–3) | UCLA (15–3) | Ole Miss (21–4) | Oregon (22–6) | South Carolina (26–7) | Oklahoma (28–8) | Oklahoma (31–10) | Oregon (33–10) | Arkansas (32–16) | Arkansas (34–17) | Oregon (43–13) | Florida State (44–15) | Virginia (50–120 | | | | 11. |
| 12. | UCLA | UCLA (2–1) | UCLA (4–2) | UCLA (8–2) | Florida State (15–0) | Florida State (18–1) | Oregon (18–6) | Georgia Tech (21–6) | Indiana (25–4) | Arkansas (25–12) | Louisville (30–9) | Oklahoma (33–11) | Louisville (37–10) | Louisville (42–10) | Indiana (40–13) | Arkansas (37–20) | Florida State (47–17) | | | | 12. |
| 13. | Ole Miss | Rice (2–1) | Rice (5–2) | Stanford (9–2) | Mississippi State (17–2) | Oregon (15–6) | Georgia Tech (18–5) | Oklahoma (25–5) | Kentucky (22–9) | UCLA (22–10) | Oregon (29–10) | Louisville (33–10) | Arizona State (30–14) | Arizona State (32–15) | New Mexico (35–18) | Kansas State (41–17) | Kansas state (45–19) | | | | 13. |
| 14. | TCU | Oregon (3–0) | Oregon (6–1) | Georgia Tech (11–1) | Arizona State (10–2) | Virginia (17–2) | Oklahoma (22–4) | Arkansas (21–8) | Rice (23–11) | Georgia Tech (26–10) | Arkansas (27–15) | Arkansas (29–15) | Indiana (35–9) | South Carolina (37–14) | Arkansas (35–19) | Mississippi State (43–17) | South Carolina (43–20) | | | | 14. |
| 15. | Oregon | Stanford (1–2) | Stanford (5–2) | Oregon (8–3) | Arkansas (11–5) | Notre Dame (12–5) | Arkansas (17–7) | South Carolina (22–6) | Arizona State (19–9) | NC State (28–10) | South Carolina (31–10) | South Carolina (33–12) | South Carolina (33–14) | Indiana (38–11) | Kansas State (39–16) | Louisville (46–12) | Oklahoma (43–21) | | | | 15. |
| 16. | Georgia Tech | Georgia Tech (3–0) | Georgia Tech (6–1) | Arkansas (7–5) | Oregon (11–5) | NC State (16–5) | Notre Dame (14–6) | Indiana (22–3) | Oregon (23–8) | Mississippi State (30–9) | Mississippi State (32–10) | Indiana (34–8) | New Mexico (30–17) | New Mexico (32–18) | Mississippi State (40–16) | Virginia Tech (38–20) | Rice (44–20) | | | | 16. |
| 17. | Florida | Florida (2–1) | Cal State Fullerton (8–0) | Oklahoma (11–1) | Notre Dame (10–3) | Oklahoma (17–4) | South Carolina (18–6) | Ole Miss (23–6) | UCLA (19–9) | Kentucky (24–11) | Indiana (29–8) | New Mexico (27–16) | Rice (31–15) | Clemson (37–15) | South Carolina (39–16) | New Mexico (37–20) | Oregon (48–16) | | | | 17. |
| 18. | Rice | Oklahoma (4–0) | Oklahoma (9–0) | Florida State (10–0) | NC State (12–4) | Rice (14–7) | Rice (18–8) | Rice (20–10) | Notre Dame (19–10) | South Carolina (27–10) | Ole Miss (29–12) | Clemson (30–14) | Oklahoma (34–14) | South Alabama (39–14) | Clemson (39–17) | South Carolina (39–18) | Arkansas (39–22) | | | | 18. |
| 19. | Oklahoma | Florida State (3–0) | Florida State (7–0) | Rice (6–5) | Rice (9–7) | Mississippi State (19–4) | Indiana (18–3) | Houston (23–6) | NC State (24–10) | Indiana (26–7) | Rice (28–14) | Rice (28–14) | Clemson (30–15) | Kansas State (37–15) | Arizona State (34–17) | Oklahoma (40–19) | Virginia Tech (40–22) | | | | 19. |
| 20. | Florida State | Cal State Fullerton (4–0) | Arizona (7–1) | Arizona (10–3) | Arizona (13–5) | Arizona State (12–4) | Houston (21–4) | Notre Dame (15–9) | Georgia Tech (23–9) | Clemson (26–11) | Georgia Tech (27–13) | South Alabama (34–12) | South Alabama (36–13) | Oklahoma State (36–13) | Oklahoma State (39–14) | Rice (41–17) | Florida Atlantic (42–22) | | | | 20. |
| 21. | New Mexico | Southern Miss (3–0) | UC Irvine (6–1) | UC Irvine (10–2) | UNLV (13–3) | Arkansas (14–7) | Gonzaga (16–7) | Cal Poly (20–6) | Mississippi State (26–9) | Ole Miss (26–10) | Stanford (22–12) | Florida (25–20) | Mississippi State (36–13) | Pittsburgh (40–11) | Virginia Tech (35–19) | Austin Peay (45–13) | Austin Peay (47–15) | | | | 21. |
| 22. | Cal State Fullerton | TCU (0–3) | Notre Dame (5–1) | Notre Dame (8–2) | Virginia (14–1) | Indiana (13–3) | Georgia Southern (16–7) | Virginia Tech (20–9) | Clemson (21–11) | Rice (25–13) | Gonzaga (26–11) | Mississippi State (33–13) | Virginia Tech (30–19) | Virginia Tech (33–19) | Seton Hall (36–17) | Clemson (39–20) | Arizona State (37–22) | | | | 22. |
| 23. | Southern Miss | Arizona (4–0) | Florida Gulf Coast (5–1) | Arizona State (7–2) | Oklahoma (12–4) | Central Arkansas (17–3) | Cal Poly (17–5) | San Diego (18–10) | Ole Miss (23–9) | Cal Poly (24–7) | UNC Wilmington (30–11) | Kentucky (26–17) | South Florida (31–16) | Ole Miss (35–17) | Troy (39–16) | Florida Atlantic (39–20) | San Diego (37–25) | | | | 23. |
| 24. | Arizona | Virginia Tech (4–0) | Southern Miss (5–2) | Virginia Tech (11–2) | Indiana (8–3) | Virginia Tech (16–5) | South Alabama (21–4) | Arizona State (15–8) | Houston (24–9) | Gonzaga (23–10) | New Mexico (24–16) | Ole Miss (31–14) | Pittsburgh (36–11) | Mississippi State (37–15) | South Alabama (40–16) | Arizona State (35–20–1) | Oklahoma State (41–19) | | | | 24. |
| 25. | San Diego | UC Irvine (3–0) | Virginia Tech (6–1) | Virginia (12–0) | Florida Gulf Coast (13–3) | San Diego (14–6) | Mississippi State (21–6) | Florida Atlantic (19–9) | Campbell (28–5) | UNC Wilmington (26–11) | Clemson (27–13) | Virginia Tech (27–18) | Stanford (26–16) | Oklahoma (35–16) | Mercer (42–14) | San Diego (35–23) | Troy (42–20) | | | | 25. |
| | Preseason Jan 24 | Week 1 Feb 18 | Week 2 Feb 25 | Week 3 Mar 4 | Week 4 Mar 11 | Week 5 Mar 18 | Week 6 Mar 25 | Week 7 Apr 1 | Week 8 Apr 8 | Week 9 Apr 15 | Week 10 Apr 22 | Week 11 Apr 29 | Week 12 May 6 | Week 13 May 13 | Week 14 May 20 | Week 15 May 27 | Week 16 June 27 | Week 17 | Week 18 | Week 19 | |
| | | Dropped: 21 New Mexico; 25 San Diego | Dropped: 17 Florida; 22 TCU | Dropped: 23 Florida Gulf Coast; 24 Southern Miss | Dropped: 13 Stanford; 21 UC Irvine; 24 Virginia Tech | Dropped: 20 Arizona; 21 Nevada-Las Vegas; 25 Florida Gulf Coast | Dropped: 16 NC State; 20 Arizona State; 23 Central Arkansas; 24 Virginia Tech; 25 San Diego | Dropped: 21 Gonzaga; 22 Georgia Southern; 24 South Alabama; 25 Mississippi State | Dropped: 21 Cal Poly; 22 Virginia Tech; 23 San Diego; 25 Florida Atlantic | Dropped: 18 Notre Dame; 24 Houston; 25 Campbell | Dropped: 17 Kentucky; 23 Cal Poly | Dropped: 20 Georgia Tech; 21 Stanford; 22 Gonzaga; 23 UNC Wilmington | Dropped: 21 Florida; 23 Kentucky; 24 Ole Miss | Dropped: 17 Rice; 23 South Florida; 25 Stanford | Dropped: 21 Pittsburgh; 23 Ole Miss; 25 Oklahoma | Dropped: 20 Oklahoma State; 22 Seton Hall; 23 Troy; 24 South Alabama; 25 Mercer | Dropped: 17 New Mexico; 22 Clemson | None | None | None | |

== Collegiate Baseball ==
| | Preseason Dec 20 | Week 1 Feb 18 | Week 2 Feb 25 | Week 3 Mar 4 | Week 4 Mar 11 | Week 5 Mar 18 | Week 6 Mar 25 | Week 7 Apr 1 | Week 8 Apr 8 | Week 9 Apr 15 | Week 10 Apr 22 | Week 11 Apr 29 | Week 12 May 6 | Week 13 May 13 | Week 14 May 20 | Week 15 May 27 | Week 16 June 4 | Week 17 June 11 | Week 18 June 26 | |
|---|---|---|---|---|---|---|---|---|---|---|---|---|---|---|---|---|---|---|---|---|
| 1. | Arkansas | North Carolina (2–0) | North Carolina (6–0) | North Carolina (10–0) | North Carolina (14–0) | North Carolina (18–1) | North Carolina (21–1) | North Carolina (24–1) | LSU (30–2) | North Carolina (34–2) | North Carolina (39–2) | Vanderbilt (39–6) | Vanderbilt (41–6) | Vanderbilt (45–6) | Vanderbilt (48–7) | LSU (52–9) | LSU (55–9) | LSU (57–9) | UCLA (49–17) | 1. |
| 2. | North Carolina | Arkansas (2–1) | Arkansas (7–1) | Vanderbilt (12–1) | Oregon State (15–0) | Oregon State (19–1) | Oregon State (21–2) | LSU (26–2) | North Carolina (29–2) | LSU (34–3) | LSU (37–4) | North Carolina (41–4) | North Carolina (42–4) | North Carolina (45–6) | LSU (48–8) | Vanderbilt (51–9) | Vanderbilt (54–10) | North Carolina (57–10) | Mississippi State (51–20) | 2. |
| 3. | Vanderbilt | Vanderbilt (2–1) | Vanderbilt (7–1) | Oregon State (12–0) | LSU (15–1) | LSU (18–2) | LSU (22–2) | Vanderbilt (25–4) | Vanderbilt (29–4) | Vanderbilt (33–4) | Cal State Fullerton (34–6) | LSU (39–6) | LSU (43–6) | LSU (45–7) | North Carolina (47–8) | North Carolina (52–8) | North Carolina (55–9) | Oregon State (50–11) | North Carolina (59–12) | 3. |
| 4. | LSU | LSU (3–0) | LSU (6–1) | LSU (10–1) | Vanderbilt (15–2) | Vanderbilt (19–2) | Florida State (22–2) | Virginia (25–3) | Virginia (29–3) | Cal State Fullerton (31–5) | Vanderbilt (35–6) | Cal State Fullerton (36–7) | Cal State Fullerton (39–7) | Oregon State (41–8) | Oregon State (43–9) | Cal state Fullerton (48–8) | Cal State Fullerton (51–8) | Louisville (51–12) | Oregon State (52–13) | 4. |
| 5. | UCLA | Oregon (3–0) | Oregon State (8–0) | Mississippi State (15–0) | South Carolina (13–2) | South Carolina (17–3) | Virginia (22–2) | Cal State Fullerton (24–4) | Cal State Fullerton (28–4) | Oregon State (28–6) | Virginia (35–6) | Oregon State (34–8) | Oregon State (37–8) | Cal State Fullerton (41–8) | Cal State Fullerton (45–8) | Oregon State (45–10) | Oregon State (48–10) | NC State (49–14) | NC State (50–16) | 5. |
| 6. | Oregon | UCLA (2–1) | Oregon (6–1) | South Carolina (8–2) | Ole Miss (16–1) | Ole Miss (20–2) | Cal State Fullerton (21–3) | Oregon State (22–4) | Oregon State (25–5) | Florida State (30–6) | Oregon State (30–8) | Oregon (33–10) | Oregon (37–11) | Oregon (40–11) | Virginia (45–9) | Virginia (47–10) | Virginia (50–10) | UCLA (44–17) | Indiana (49–16) | 6. |
| 7. | South Carolina | South Carolina (2–1) | South Carolina (5–1) | Kentucky (10–1) | Florida State (15–0) | Florida State (18–1) | Vanderbilt (21–4) | Florida State (24–4) | Florida State (27–5) | Oregon (27–8) | UCLA (25–11) | NC State (34–11) | NC State (37–11) | Virginia (42–8) | Oregon (43–13) | Oregon (45–14) | Florida State (47–15) | Mississippi State (48–18) | LSU (57–11) | 7. |
| 8. | Kentucky | Kentucky (2–0) | Kentucky (5–1) | NC State (10–1) | Mississippi State (17–2) | Kentucky (16–3) | UCLA (17–4) | Oregon (22–6) | Oklahoma (27–6) | Louisville (28–7) | Oregon (29–10) | Virginia (38–8) | Virginia (39–8) | NC State (39–12) | Louisville (46–10) | Louisville (46–12) | Louisville (49–12) | Indiana (48–14) | Louisville (51–14) | 8. |
| 9. | Stanford | Oregon State (3–0) | Mississippi State (9–0) | Stanford (9–2) | Kentucky (13–2) | UCLA (15–3) | Kentucky (18–5) | Kentucky (21–6) | Oregon (23–8) | Virginia (31–6) | NC State (32–10) | Florida State (35–9) | Florida State (38–9) | Florida State (41–10) | Florida State (44–11) | Florida State (44–15) | NC State (47–14) | Vanderbilt (54–12) | Vanderbilt (54–12) | 9. |
| 10. | Oregon State | Rice (2–1) | Oklahoma (9–0) | Oklahoma (11–1) | UCLA (11–3) | Georgia Tech (17–2) | Oregon (18–6) | Oklahoma (25–5) | Arkansas (23–9) | Oklahoma (28–8) | Florida State (31–9) | Oklahoma (33–11) | Louisville (37–10) | Louisville (42–10) | NC State (42–13) | NC State (44–14) | UCLA (42–17) | Cal State Fullerton (51–10) | Cal State Fullerton (51–10) | 10. |
| 11. | NC State | Stanford (1–2) | NC State (5–1) | Ole Miss (11–1) | Georgia Tech (14–2) | Virginia (17–2) | Oklahoma (22–4) | Arkansas (21–8) | Louisville (25–6) | UCLA (22–10) | Oklahoma (31–10) | Louisville (33–10) | UCLA (31–13) | UCLA (34–14) | UCLA (37–15) | UCLA (39–17) | South Carolina (42–18) | Virginia (50–12) | Virginia (50–12) | 11. |
| 12. | San Diego | Mississippi State (4–0) | UCLA (4–2) | Cal State Fullerton (10–1) | Virginia (14–1) | Cal State Fullerton (16–3) | Arkansas (17–7) | Louisville (22–5) | South Carolina (26–7) | Clemson (26–11) | Louisville (30–9) | UCLA (27–13) | Arkansas (32–16) | Arkansas (34–17) | Arkansas (35–19) | Arkansas (37–20) | Mississippi State (46–18) | Florida State (47–17) | Florida State (47–17) | 12. |
| 13. | Mississippi State | NC State (0–1) | Rice (5–2) | UCLA (8–2) | Cal State Fullerton (13–3) | Louisville (16–2) | Texas A&M (17–8) | UCLA (18–6) | Indiana (25–4) | Arkansas (25–12) | Clemson (27–13) | Arizona State (28–12–1) | Oklahoma (34–14) | Arizona State (32–15–1) | Arizona State (34–17–1) | South Carolina (39–18) | Rice (44–18) | South Carolina (43–20) | South Carolina (43–20) | 13. |
| 14. | Oklahoma | Oklahoma (4–0) | Stanford (5–2) | Oregon (8–3) | Louisville (12–2) | Mississippi State (19–4) | South Carolina (18–6) | South Carolina (22–6) | Kentucky (22–9) | Georgia Tech (26–10) | Stanford (22–12) | Clemson (30–14) | Arizona State (30–14–1) | Clemson (37–15) | Clemson (39–17) | Mississippi State (43–17) | Oklahoma (42–18) | Rice (44–20) | Rice (44–20) | 14. |
| 15. | TCU | Arizona (3–0) | Arizona (7–1) | Florida State (10–0) | Arizona State (10–2–1) | Oregon (15–6) | Ole Miss (21–4) | Georgia Tech (21–6) | UCLA (19–9) | NC State (28–10) | South Carolina (31–10) | South Carolina (33–12) | Clemson (30–15) | South Carolina (37–14) | South Carolina (39–16) | Kansas State (41–17) | Kansas State (44–17) | Kansas State (45–19) | Kansas State (45–19) | 15. |
| 16. | Arizona State | Ole Miss (3–0) | Ole Miss (7–0) | Georgia Tech (11–1) | Oregon (11–5) | NC State (16–5) | Georgia Tech (18–5) | Indiana (22–3) | Notre Dame (19–10) | Cal Poly (24–9) | Arkansas (27–15) | Arkansas (29–15) | South Carolina (33–14) | Pittsburgh (40–11) | New Mexico (35–18) | Arizona State (35–20–1) | Indiana (46–14) | Oklahoma (43–21) | Oklahoma (43–21) | 16. |
| 17. | Georgia Tech | Georgia Tech (3–0) | Cal State Fullerton (8–0) | Virginia (12–0) | NC State (12–4) | Stanford (10–5) | Notre Dame (14–6) | Cal Poly (20–6) | Clemson (21–11) | Stanford (19–11) | Mississippi State (32–10) | Pittsburgh (32–10) | Pittsburgh (36–11) | New Mexico (32–18) | Kansas State (39–16) | Clemson (39–20) | Oregon (48–16) | Oregon (48–16) | Oregon (48–16) | 17. |
| 18. | Arizona | Florida State (3–0) | Florida State (7–0) | Arizona (10–3) | Stanford (10–5) | Oklahoma (17–4) | Louisville (19–4) | Texas A&M (18–11) | Georgia Tech (23–9) | Mississippi State (30–9) | Cal Poly (26–11) | New Mexico (27–16) | New Mexico (30–17) | Kansas State (37–15) | Mississippi State (40–16) | New Mexico (37–20) | Arkansas (39–22) | Arkansas (39–22) | Arkansas (39–22) | 18. |
| 19. | Florida State | Cal State Fullerton (4–0) | Georgia Tech (6–1) | Louisville (9–2) | Oklahoma (12–4) | Notre Dame (12–5) | Mississippi State (21–6) | Ole Miss (23–6) | NC State (24–10) | Florida (19–18) | Florida (22–19) | Florida (25–20) | Stanford (26–16) | Oklahoma (35–16) | Seton Hall (36–17) | Virginia Tech (38–20) | Arizona State (37–22–1) | Arizona State (37–22–1) | Arizona State (37–22–1) | 19. |
| 20. | Rice | Miami (FL) (3–0) | Miami (FL) (7–0) | Arizona State (7–2–1) | Cal Poly (13–2) | Cal Poly (15–4) | Houston (21–4) | Houston (23–6) | Cal Poly (21–8) | Ole Miss (26–10) | Ole Miss (29–12) | South Florida (29–15) | South Florida (31–16) | Ole Miss (35–17) | Oklahoma State (39–14) | Oklahoma (40–19) | Virginia Tech (40–22) | Virginia Tech (40–22) | Virginia Tech (40–22) | 20. |
| 21. | Texas | UC Irvine (3–0) | UC Irvine (6–1) | Cal Poly (9–1) | Notre Dame (10–3) | Oklahoma State (17–3) | Cal Poly (17–5) | Oklahoma State (21–6) | Rice (23–11) | Arizona (23–12) | Georgia Tech (27–13) | Indiana (34–8) | Indiana (35–9) | Indiana (38–11) | Troy (39–16) | Cal Poly (39–17) | Cal Poly (40–19) | Cal Poly (40–19) | Cal Poly (40–19) | 21. |
| 22. | Louisville | San Diego State (3–0) | Texas (6–1) | UC Irvine (10–2) | Arkansas (11–5) | Arizona State (12–4–1) | Oklahoma State (19–4) | Alabama (18–11) | Alabama (20–13) | South Carolina (27–10) | Gonzaga (26–11–1) | Stanford (23–15) | Cal Poly (31–14) | South Alabama (39–14) | Indiana (40–13) | Indiana (43–14) | Oklahoma State (41–19) | Oklahoma State (41–19) | Oklahoma State (41–19) | 22. |
| 23. | Cal State Fullerton | Arizona State (2–1) | Louisville (6–1) | Florida Gulf Coast (8–3) | Florida Gulf Coast (13–3) | UC Irvine (15–5) | UC Irvine (15–5) | Notre Dame (15–9) | Stanford (16–10) | Kentucky (24–11) | Pittsburgh (29–10) | Arizona (28–14) | South Alabama (36–13) | Mississippi State (37–15) | Cal Poly (37–16) | Rice (41–17) | Troy (42–20) | Troy (42–20) | Troy (42–20) | 23. |
| 24. | Florida | Florida (2–1) | Virginia (7–0) | Miami (FL) (10–2) | Arizona (13–5) | Texas A&M (14–7) | South Alabama (21–4) | Mississippi State (23–8) | Texas A&M (20–13) | Arizona State (22–10–1) | Arizona (25–14) | Cal Poly (28–13) | Mississippi State (36–13) | Seton Hall (33–16) | Ole Miss (36–20) | Ole Miss (37–22) | Florida Atlantic (42–22) | Florida Atlantic (42–22) | Florida Atlantic (42–22) | 24. |
| 25. | Ole Miss | Texas (2–1) | Florida Gulf Coast (5–1) | Notre Dame (8–2) | UNLV (13–3) | South Alabama (17–4) | Indiana (18–3) | Florida Gulf Coast (18–6) | Arizona (21–11) | Pittsburgh (24–9) | South Florida (26–14) | South Alabama (34–12) | Troy (35–12) | UC Irvine (31–16) | South Alabama (40–16) | Oklahoma State (39–17) | Central Arkansas (42–22) | Central Arkansas (42–22) | Central Arkansas (42–22) | 25. |
| 26. | Texas A&M | Louisville (2–1) | Arizona State (4–2) | Oklahoma State (9–2) | Clemson (9–5) | Florida Gulf Coast (13–4) | Florida Gulf Coast (15–5) | Pittsburgh (19–6) | Mississippi State (26–9) | Coastal Carolina (24–12) | Arizona State (14–12–10 | Ole Miss (31–14) | Rice (31–15) | Oklahoma State (36–13) | Rice (37–17) | Troy (40–18) | Liberty (36–29) | Liberty (36–29) | Liberty (36–29) | 26. |
| 27. | Clemson | Texas A&M (2–1) | Cal Poly (7–0) | Virginia Tech (11–2) | Oklahoma State (12–3) | California (13–7) | Campbell (21–3) | NC State (19–10) | Arizona State (19–9–1) | Rice (25–13) | Rice (28–14) | Rice (28–14) | Ole Miss (33–16) | Sam Houston State (33–18) | Sam Houston State (36–18) | South Alabama (42–18) | Clemson (40–22) | Clemson (40–22) | Clemson (40–22) | 27. |
| 28. | Miami (FL) | Clemson (2–1) | Clemson (5–1) | Rice (6–5) | UC Irvine (12–4) | Arkansas (14–7) | Rice (18–8) | Rice (20–10) | Houston (24–9) | South Florida (22–14) | New Mexico (24–16) | Mississippi State (33–13) | Sam Houston State (31–17) | Campbell (43–9) | Campbell (46–9 | Sam Houston State (37–20) | William & Mary (39–24) | William & Mary (39–24) | William & Mary (39–24) | 28. |
| 29. | Georgia | Virginia (2–0) | Pepperdine (6–2) | Arkansas (7–5) | Miami (FL) (13–4) | Campbell (16–3) | NC State (16–9) | San Diego (18–10) | Florida Gulf Coast (20–8) | Houston (25–11) | Campbell (25–8) | Campbell (37–8) | Kansas State (34–15) | Western Carolina (36–17) | Western Carolina (38–18) | Coastal Carolina (37–21) | Austin Peay State (47–15) | Austin Peay State (47–15) | Austin Peay State (47–15) | 29. |
| 30. | UC Irvine | Southern Miss (3–0) | South Alabama (7–0) | Maryland (9–3) | Central Arkansas (14–2) | Central Arkansas (17–3) | Pittsburgh (15–6) | Florida Atlantic (19–9) | Creighton (18–6) | Bryant (23–9–1) | Houston (27–13) | UCF (25–19) | Campbell (39–9) | Coastal Carolina (32–18) | Coastal Carolina (35–19) | San Diego (35–23) | San Diego (37–25) | San Diego (37–25) | San Diego (37–25) | 30. |
| | Preseason Dec 20 | Week 1 Feb 18 | Week 2 Feb 25 | Week 3 Mar 4 | Week 4 Mar 11 | Week 5 Mar 18 | Week 6 Mar 25 | Week 7 Apr 1 | Week 8 Apr 8 | Week 9 Apr 15 | Week 10 Apr 22 | Week 11 Apr 29 | Week 12 May 6 | Week 13 May 13 | Week 14 May 20 | Week 15 May 27 | Week 16 June 4 | Week 17 June 11 | Week 18 June 26 | |
| | | Dropped: 12 San Diego; 15 TCU; 29 Georgia | Dropped: 22 San Diego State; 24 Florida; 27 Texas A&M; 30 Southern Miss | Dropped: 22 Texas; 28 Clemson; 29 Pepperdine; 30 South Alabama | Dropped: 27 Virginia Tech; 28 Rice; 30 Maryland | Dropped: 24 Arizona; 25 UNLV; 26 Clemson; 29 Miami (FL) | Dropped: 17 Stanford; 22 Arizona State; 27 California; 30 Central Arkansas | Dropped: 23 UC Irvine; 24 South Alabama; 27 Campbell | Dropped: 21 Oklahoma State; 26 Pittsburgh; 29 San Diego; 30 Florida Atlantic | Dropped: 13 Indiana; 16 Notre Dame; 22 Alabama; 24 Texas A&M; 29 Florida Gulf Coast; 30 Creighton | Dropped: 23 Kentucky; 26 Coastal Carolina; 30 Bryant | Dropped: 21 Georgia Tech; 22 Gonzaga; 30 Houston | Dropped: 19 Florida; 23 Arizona; 30 UCF | Dropped: 19 Stanford; 20 South Florida; 22 Cal Poly; 25 Troy; 26 Rice | Dropped: 16 Pittsburgh; 19 Oklahoma; 25 UC Irvine | Dropped: 19 Seton Hall; 28 Campbell; 29 Western Carolina | Dropped: 18 New Mexico; 24 Ole Miss; 27 South Alabama; 28 Sam Houston State; 29 Coastal Carolina | None | None | |

The Preseason poll ranked the top 40 teams in the nation. Teams not listed above are: 31. Missouri State; 32. Wichita State; 33. New Mexico; 34. Kent State; 35. Virginia; 36. Southern Miss; 37. East Carolina 38. Coastal Carolina; 39. Dallas Baptist 40. Pepperdine.

== NCBWA ==
| | Preseason Jan 28 | Week 1 Feb 18 | Week 2 Feb 25 | Week 3 Mar 4 | Week 4 Mar 11 | Week 5 Mar 18 | Week 6 Mar 25 | Week 7 Apr 1 | Week 8 Apr 8 | Week 9 Apr 15 | Week 10 Apr 22 | Week 11 Apr 29 | Week 12 May 6 | Week 13 May 13 | Week 14 May 20 | Week 15 May 27 | Week 16 June 4 | Week 17 June 26 | |
|---|---|---|---|---|---|---|---|---|---|---|---|---|---|---|---|---|---|---|---|
| 1. | Arkansas | North Carolina (2–0) | North Carolina (6–0) | North Carolina (10–0) | North Carolina (14–0) | North Carolina (18–1) | North Carolina (21–1) | North Carolina (24–1) | North Carolina (29–2) | North Carolina (34–2) | North Carolina (39–2) | Vanderbilt (39–6) | Vanderbilt (41–6) | Vanderbilt (45–6) | Vanderbilt (48–7) | LSU (52–9) | LSU (55–9) | UCLA (49–17) | 1. |
| 2. | North Carolina | LSU (3–0) | Arkansas (7–1) | Vanderbilt (12–1) | Vanderbilt (15–2) | Vanderbilt (19–2) | LSU (22–2) | LSU (26–2) | LSU (30–2) | LSU (34–3) | LSU (37–4) | North Carolina (41–4) | North Carolina (42–4) | LSU (45–7) | LSU (48–8) | Vanderbilt (51–9) | Cal State Fullerton (51–8) | Mississippi State (51–20) | 2. |
| 3. | LSU | Arkansas (2–1) | Vanderbilt (7–1) | LSU (10–1) | LSU (15–1) | LSU (18–2) | Oregon State (21–2) | Vanderbilt (25–4) | Vanderbilt (29–4) | Vanderbilt (33–4) | Cal State Fullerton (34–6) | Cal State Fullerton (36–7) | Cal State Fullerton (39–7) | Oregon State (41–8) | Oregon State (43–9) | Cal State Fullerton (48–8) | Vanderbilt (54–10) | North Carolina (59–12) | 3. |
| 4. | Vanderbilt | Vanderbilt (2–1) | LSU (6–1) | Oregon State (12–0) | Oregon State (15–0) | Oregon State (19–1) | Florida State (22–2) | Cal State Fullerton (24–4) | Cal State Fullerton (28–4) | Cal State Fullerton (31–5) | Vanderbilt (35–6) | LSU (39–6) | LSU (43–6) | North Carolina (45–6) | Cal State Fullerton (45–8) | North Carolina (52–8) | North Carolina (55–9) | Oregon State (52–13) | 4. |
| 5. | UCLA | Oregon (3–0) | Oregon State (8–0) | Florida State (10–0) | Florida State (15–0) | Florida State (18–1) | Vanderbilt (21–4) | Oregon (22–6) | Virginia (29–3) | Florida State (30–6) | Virginia (35–6) | Oregon State (34–8) | Oregon State (37–8) | Cal State Fullerton (41–8) | Virginia (45–9) | Oregon State (45–10) | Oregon State (48–10) | NC State (50–16) | 5. |
| 6. | South Carolina | UCLA (2–1) | Oregon (6–1) | Mississippi State (15–0) | South Carolina (13–2) | South Carolina (17–3) | UCLA (17–4) | Virginia (25–3) | Florida State (27–5) | Oregon State (28–6) | Oregon State (30–8) | Oregon (33–10) | Oregon (37–11) | Oregon (40–11) | North Carolina (47–8) | Virginia (47–10) | Virginia (50–10) | LSU (57–11) | 6. |
| 7. | Stanford | South Carolina (2–1) | Florida State (7–0) | UCLA (8–2) | UCLA (11–3) | UCLA (15–3) | Cal State Fullerton (21–3) | Florida State (24–4) | Oregon State (25–5) | Oregon (27–8) | Oregon (29–10) | Virginia (38–8) | Virginia (39–8) | Virginia (42–8) | Florida State (44–11) | Oregon (45–14) | NC State (47–14) | Indiana (49–16) | 7. |
| 8. | Oregon | Oregon State (3–0) | South Carolina (5–1) | South Carolina (8–2) | Ole Miss (16–1) | Ole Miss (20–2) | Oregon (18–6) | Oregon State (22–4) | Arkansas (23–9) | Virginia (31–6) | UCLA (25–11) | Florida State (35–9) | Florida State (38–9) | Florida State (41–10) | Oregon (43–13) | NC State (44–14) | Florida State (47–15) | Louisville (51–14) | 8. |
| 9. | NC State | Florida State (3–0) | UCLA (4–2) | Stanford (9–2) | Kentucky (13–2) | Kentucky (16–3) | Virginia (22–2) | Arkansas (21–8) | Oregon (23–8) | Louisville (28–7) | Florida State (31–9) | South Carolina (33–12) | NC State (37–11) | NC State (39–12) | Louisville (46–10) | Mississippi State (43–17) | Mississippi State (46–18) | Vanderbilt (54–12) | 9. |
| 10. | Oregon State | Arizona (3–0) | Mississippi State (9–0) | Kentucky (10–1) | Mississippi State (17–2) | Cal State Fullerton (16–3) | Kentucky (18–5) | Kentucky (21–6) | South Carolina (26–7) | Arkansas (25–12) | Mississippi State (32–10) | NC State (34–11) | Louisville (37–10) | Louisville (42–10) | NC State (42–13) | Florida State (44–15) | UCLA (42–1&) | Cal State Fullerton (51–10) | 10. |
| 11. | Florida State | Kentucky (2–0) | Arizona (7–1) | Oregon (8–3) | Arkansas (11–5) | Georgia Tech (17–2) | Arkansas (17–7) | UCLA (18–6) | Oklahoma (27–6) | Mississippi State (30–9) | South Carolina (31–10) | Louisville (33–10) | UCLA (31–13) | UCLA (34–14) | UCLA (37–15) | UCLA (39–17) | Louisville (49–12) | Virginia (50–12) | 11. |
| 12. | Kentucky | Rice (2–1) | Rice (5–2) | NC State (10–1) | Oregon (11–5) | Oregon (15–6) | Ole Miss (21–4) | South Carolina (22–6) | Louisville (25–6) | UCLA (22–10) | Louisville (30–9) | UCLA (27–13) | South Carolina (33–14) | South Carolina (37–14) | Oklahoma State (39–14) | Indiana (43–14) | Indiana (46–14) | Florida State (47–17) | 12. |
| 13. | TCU | Mississippi State (5–0) | Kentucky (5–1) | Cal State Fullerton (10–1) | Cal State Fullerton (13–3) | Louisville (16–2) | South Carolina (18–6) | Oklahoma (25–5) | Indiana (25–4) | Oklahoma (28–8) | NC State (32–10) | Oklahoma (33–11) | Mississippi State (36–13) | Arkansas (34–17) | Mississippi State (40–16) | Louisville (46–12) | Kansas State (44–17) | South Carolina (43–20) | 13. |
| 14. | Arizona | Stanford (1–2) | Stanford (5–2) | Oklahoma (11–1) | Georgia Tech (14–2) | Mississippi State (19–4) | Oklahoma (22–4) | Louisville (22–5) | Kentucky (22–9) | Arizona State (22–10–1) | Oklahoma (31–10) | Arizona State (28–12–1) | Arkansas (32–16) | Arizona State (32–15–1) | South Carolina (39–16) | Kansas State (41–17) | Rice (44–18) | Kansas State (45–19) | 14. |
| 15. | Florida | Oklahoma (4–0) | Oklahoma (9–0) | Ole Miss (11–1) | Louisville (12–2) | Virginia (17–2) | Louisville (19–4) | Georgia Tech (21–6) | UCLA (19–9) | South Carolina (27–10) | Arkansas (27–15) | Mississippi State (33–13) | Arizona State (30–14–1) | Indiana (38–11) | Indiana (40–13) | Rice (41–17) | South Carolina (42–18) | Rice (44–20) | 15. |
| 16. | Mississippi State | NC State (0–1) | NC State (5–1) | Arkansas (7–5) | Stanford (10–5) | Arkansas (14–7) | Georgia Tech (18–5) | Ole Miss (23–6) | Mississippi State (26–9) | Georgia Tech (26–10) | Arizona State (24–12–1) | Arkansas (29–15) | Indiana (35–9) | Oklahoma State (36–13) | Arizona State (34–17–1) | South Carolina (39–18) | Oklahoma (43–19) | Oklahoma (43–21) | 16. |
| 17. | Oklahoma | Florida (2–1) | Ole Miss (7–0) | Arizona (10–3) | Virginia (14–1) | Stanford (10–5) | Mississippi State (21–6) | Indiana (22–3) | Arizona State (19–9–1) | NC State (28–10) | Indiana (29–8) | Indiana (34–8) | Rice (31–15) | Mississippi State (37–15) | Kansas State (39–16) | Arkansas (37–20) | Oregon (48–16) | Oregon (48–16) | 17. |
| 18. | Rice | Ole Miss (3–0) | Cal State Fullerton (8–0) | Georgia Tech (11–1) | NC State (12–4) | Oklahoma (17–4) | Oklahoma State (19–4) | Mississippi State (23–8) | Rice (23–11) | Kentucky (24–11) | Ole Miss (29–12) | Rice (28–14) | Oklahoma (34–14) | Ole Miss (35–17) | Arkansas (35–19) | Oklahoma State (39–17) | Arkansas (39–22) | Arkansas (39–22) | 18. |
| 19. | Louisville | Cal State Fullerton (4–0) | Louisville (6–1) | Virginia (12–0) | Arizona State (10–2–1) | NC State (16–4) | Notre Dame (14–6) | Oklahoma State (21–6) | Georgia Tech (23–9) | Indiana (26–7) | Georgia Tech (27–13) | UC Irvine (28–12) | Oklahoma State (34–12) | Clemson (37–15) | Rice (37–17) | Oklahoma (40–19) | Oklahoma State (41–19) | Oklahoma State (41–19) | 19. |
| 20. | San Diego | Georgia Tech (3–0) | Georgia Tech (6–1) | Louisville (9–2) | Oklahoma (12–4) | Oklahoma State (17–3) | Rice (18–8) | Cal Poly (20–6) | NC State (24–10) | Ole Miss (26–10) | Rice (28–14) | Oklahoma State (32–11) | Ole Miss (33–16) | Rice (33–17) | Clemson (39–17) | Arizona State (35–20–1) | Arizona State (37–22–1) | Arizona State (37–22–1) | 20. |
| 21. | Georgia Tech | Louisville (2–1) | Miami (FL) (7–0) | UC Irvine (10–2) | Arizona (13–5) | Arizona State (12–4–1) | UC Irvine (15–5) | Rice (20–10) | Ole Miss (23–9) | UC Irvine (23–9) | Stanford (22–12) | Ole Miss (31–14) | Stanford (26–16) | Oklahoma (35–16) | Ole Miss (36–20) | Cal Poly (39–17) | Virginia Tech (40–22) | Virginia Tech (40–22) | 21. |
| 22. | Arizona State | Arizona State (2–1) | Virginia (7–0) | Rice (6–5) | Cal Poly (13–2) | Notre Dame (12–5) | Houston (21–4) | Arizona State (15–8–1) | Notre Dame (19–10) | Cal Poly (24–9) | UC Irvine (25–11) | Arizona (28–14) | Cal Poly (31–14) | Kansas State (37–15) | Cal Poly (37–16) | Ole Miss (37–22) | Austin Peay State (47–15) | Florida Atlantic (42–22) | 22. |
| 23. | Cal State Fullerton | Miami (FL) (3–0) | UC Irvine (6–1) | Arizona State (7–2–1) | Notre Dame (10–3) | UC Irvine (15–5) | Stanford (11–7) | Houston (23–6) | UC Irvine (20–8) | Rice (25–13) | Cal Poly (26–11) | Georgia Tech (28–16) | UC Irvine (29–15) | Pittsburgh (40–11) | Mercer (42–14) | Campbell (49–10) | Cal Poly (40–19) | Austin Peay State (47–15) | 23. |
| 24. | Texas A&M | TCU (0–3) | Arizona State (4–2) | Miami (FL) (10–2) | Oklahoma State (12–3) | Rice (14–7) | Indiana (18–3) | Notre Dame (15–9) | Cal Poly (21–8) | Stanford (19–11) | Oklahoma State (27–11) | Mercer (36–12) | Mercer (36–12) | UC Irvine (31–16) | Campbell (46–9) | Clemson (39–20) | Florida Atlantic (42–22) | Cal Poly (40–19) | 24. |
| 25. | Ole Miss | Virginia (2–0) | Texas (6–1) | Cal Poly (9–1) | Florida Gulf Coast (13–3) | Arizona (15–8) | Cal Poly (17–5) | NC State (19–10) | Stanford (16–10) | Arizona (23–12) | Kentucky (24–15) | Clemson (30–14) | Clemson (30–15) | South Alabama (39–14) | Oklahoma (36–19) | Austin Peay State (45–13) | Ole Miss (38–24) | Central Arkansas (42–22) | 25. |
| 26. | Texas | Texas A&M (2–1) | Clemson (5–1) | Notre Dame (8–2) | UC Irvine (12–4) | Cal Poly (15–4) | Arizona State (13–7–1) | Stanford (13–9) | Oklahoma State 922–8) | Clemson (26–11) | Mercer (32–11) | Kentucky (26–17) | South Alabama (36–13) | Georgia Tech (32–20) | Austin Peay State (42–13) | Virginia Tech (38–20) | Campbell (49–10) | Ole Miss (38–24) | 26. |
| 27. | Baylor | UC Irvine (3–0) | Florida Gulf Coast (5–1) | Oklahoma State (9–2) | Rice (9–7) | Central Arkansas (17–3) | NC State (16–9) | UC Irvine (16–8) | Arizona (21–11) | Oklahoma State (24–10) | Arizona (25–14) | Stanford (23–15) | Arizona (29–17) | Cal Poly (33–16) | South Alabama (40–16) | Mercer (43–16) | Central Arkansas (42–22) | Georgia Tech (37–27) | 27. |
| 28. | Clemson | Southern Miss (3–0) | Cal Poly (7–0) | Mercer (11–1) | UNLV (13–3) | Houston (16–4) | South Alabama (21–4) | Florida Gulf Coast (18–6) | Houston (24–9) | Mercer (29–10) | Notre Dame (22–15) | Cal Poly (28–13) | Kansas State (34–15) | Mercer (39–14) | New Mexico (35–18) | New Mexico (37–20) | Clemson (40–22) | Campbell (49–10) | 28. |
| 29. | Miami (FL) | Texas (2–1) | Florida (3–5) | Florida Gulf Coast (8–3) | Miami (FL) (13–4) | Indiana (13–3) | Florida Gulf Coast (15–5) | Arizona (18–11) | Campbell (28–5) | Notre Dame (19–14) | Clemson (27–13) | Notre Dame (26–16) | Pittsburgh (36–11) | Campbell (43–9) | Pittsburgh (40–15) | South Alabama (42–18) | Georgia Tech (37–27) | Clemson (40–22) | 29. |
| 30. | Virginia | Clemson (2–1) | Texas A&M (5–3) | Virginia Tech (11–2) | Central Arkansas (14–2) | Florida Gulf Coast (13–4) | Texas A&M (17–8) | Virginia Tech (20–9) | Florida Gulf Coast (20–8) | Coastal Carolina (24–12) | UNC Wilmington (30–11) | South Alabama (34–12) | Georgia Tech (29–18) | Austin Peay State (38–13) | Troy (39–16) | Bryant (44–16–1) | South Alabama (43–20) | South Alabama (43–20) | 30. |
| | Preseason Jan 28 | Week 1 Feb 18 | Week 2 Feb 25 | Week 3 Mar 4 | Week 4 Mar 11 | Week 5 Mar 18 | Week 6 Mar 25 | Week 7 Apr 1 | Week 8 Apr 8 | Week 9 Apr 15 | Week 10 Apr 22 | Week 11 Apr 29 | Week 12 May 6 | Week 13 May 13 | Week 14 May 20 | Week 15 May 27 | Week 16 June 4 | Week 17 June 26 | |
| | | Dropped: 20 San Diego; 27 Baylor | Dropped: 24 TCU; 28 Southern Miss | Dropped: 25 Texas; 26 Clemson; 29 Florida; 30 Texas A&M | Dropped: 28 Mercer; 30 Virginia Tech | Dropped: 28 UNLV; 29 Miami (FL) | Dropped: 25 Arizona; 27 Central Arkansas | Dropped: 28 South Alabama; 30 Texas A&M | Dropped: 30 Virginia Tech | Dropped: 28 Houston; 29 Campbell; 30 Florida Gulf Coast | Dropped: 30 Coastal Carolina | Dropped: 30 UNC Wilmington | Dropped: 26 Kentucky; 29 Notre Dame | Dropped: 21 Stanford; 27 Arizona | Dropped: 24 UC Irvine; 26 Georgia Tech | Dropped: 29 Pittsburgh; 30 Troy | Dropped: 27 Mercer; 28 New Mexico; 30 Bryant | None | |

The preseason poll ranked the top 35 teams. Remaining teams not listed above were: 31. Kent State 32. Southern Miss 33. UC Irvine 34. New Mexico 35. Coastal Carolina
