= Connelley =

Connelley (from Ó Conghalaigh) may refer to:

== People ==
- William E. Connelley

or similar sounding

- Connolly (surname)
- Connelly (surname)

== See also ==
- Connolly (disambiguation)
- Connelly (disambiguation)
