= Connolley =

Connolley (from Ó Conghalaigh) may refer to:

- William Connolley

Connolley is not to be confused with other surnames such as:

- Connolly (surname)
- Connelly (surname)

== See also ==
- Connolly (disambiguation)
- Connelly (disambiguation)
