= Conolly =

Conolly is a surname. Notable people with the surname include:

- Arthur Conolly (1807–1842), British intelligence officer, explorer and writer
- Barbara Conolly, Cayman Islands politician
- Claud Conolly Cowan or Claude Dampier (1879–1955), British film actor
- Clive Conolly (born 1955), Zimbabwean sports shooter
- Conolly Abel Smith CB GCVO JP (1899–1985), Vice Admiral in the British Royal Navy who served during World War I and World War II
- Conolly Gage (1905–1984), British politician and judge
- Conolly Norman (1853–1908), Irish alienist, or psychiatrist
- David Conolly, writer, director, comedian and actor
- Edward Michael Conolly (1786–1849), Irish Member of Parliament
- Edward Tennyson Conolly (1822–1908), New Zealand lawyer, politician and judge
- Islay Conolly (1923–2022), Caymanian educator
- James Conolly, Canadian anthropologist
- John Augustus Conolly, Irish recipient of the Victoria Cross
- John Conolly (1794–1866), English psychiatrist
- Katherine Conolly (c.1662–1752), Irish political hostess, landowner, and philanthropist
- Kevin Conolly MP, an Australian politician, is a member of the New South Wales Legislative Assembly
- Lady Louisa Conolly (1743–1821), the third of the four Lennox Sisters in Stella Tillyard's book Aristocrats
- Patricia Conolly (born 1933), Australian stage actress
- Patrick Conolly-Carew, 7th Baron Carew (1938–2024), Irish equestrian and hereditary peer
- Richard L. Conolly (1892–1962), United States Navy Admiral, who served during World War I and World War II
- Sarah Conolly (Emmerdale) or Sarah Sugden (née Connolly), fictional character in the British ITV soap opera, Emmerdale
- Thomas Conolly (1738–1803) (1738–1803), Irish landowner
- Violet Conolly (1899–1988), Irish authority on Soviet Russia and a traveller
- William Conolly (1662–1729), Irish politician, Commissioner of Revenue, lawyer and landowner
- William Conolly-Carew, 6th Baron Carew CBE C.St.J (1905–1994), Aide-de-Camp to the Governor of Bermuda, Sir Thomas Astley-Cubbitt 1931–1936
- William James Conolly (died 1754), Irish politician
- William Warren Conolly, OBE, JP (1920–2008), politician and Attorney in the Cayman Islands
- Yvonne Conolly (1939–2021), Jamaican teacher

== See also ==
- USS Conolly (DD-979), Spruance-class destroyer built in Pascagoula, Mississippi
- Conley (disambiguation)
- Connelly (disambiguation)
- Connolly (disambiguation)
- Cononley
