= Conley =

- Language: Irish

Origin
- Meaning: 'hound valiant' 'faithful to pledges' 'constant fire' 'intellect' 'chief, king, head'
- Region of origin: Ireland

Other names
- Variant forms: Connelly, Connolly, Connley

Conley or Connley from O′Conghaile or Ó Conghalaigh (“hound valiant”) is a surname of Irish or Manx origin. The anglicized forms Conneely, Connealy, and Cunneely emerged due to the loss of the "gh" sound, which lengthened the second syllable of Conghal. In Connacht, these forms are often shortened from McNeilly, derived from Mac Conghaile. Another possible origin is the West Cork name Mac Coingheallaigh or Ó Coingheallaigh, meaning "faithful to pledges." Historically, O'Connolly was a principal name of County Monaghan.

Conley is also used as a male given name, anglicized from Old Irish Conláed, meaning “constant fire,” from cunnail (“prudent, constant”) and áed (“fire”). Alternatively, Connley, with two n’s, derives from Connla (also Connláech), a name that may come from Old Irish cond (“intellect,” “mind, “reason/sense,” or “king”) or cenn (“head,” “chief”). In Irish mythology, Connla is the son of Cú Chulainn and Aífe, who was tragically killed in combat by his father.

== People with the surname ==
=== Arts and letters ===
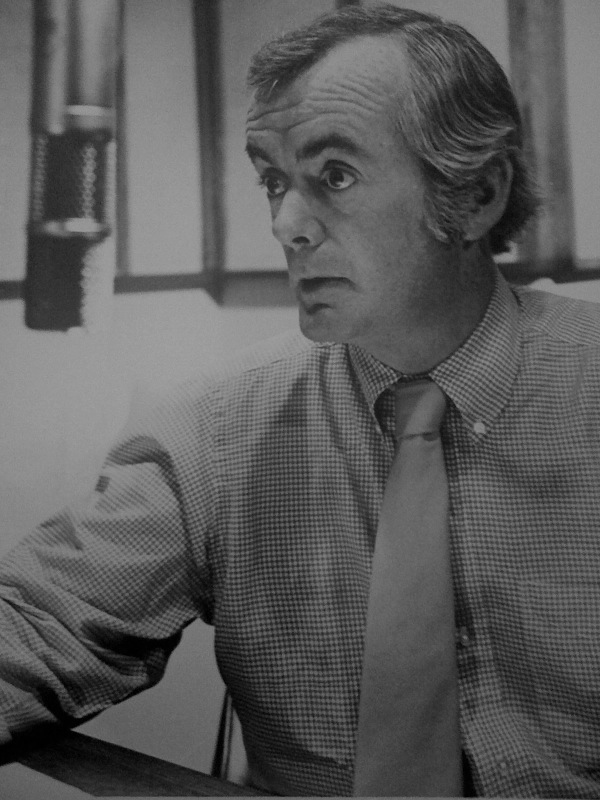
Robert Conley, reporter (1960s)

- Darby Conley (born 1970), American cartoonist
- Garrard Conley (born 1984 or 1985), American author
- Marjorie Margaret Conley (1931–1959), Australian operatic soprano
- Philip Mallory Conley (1887–1979), American historian
- Robert Conley (reporter) (1928–2013), American reporter
- Robert J. Conley (1940–2014), Cherokee author
- Tom Conley (philologist) (born 1943), American philologist
- Willy Conley (born 1958), American photographer

=== Business ===
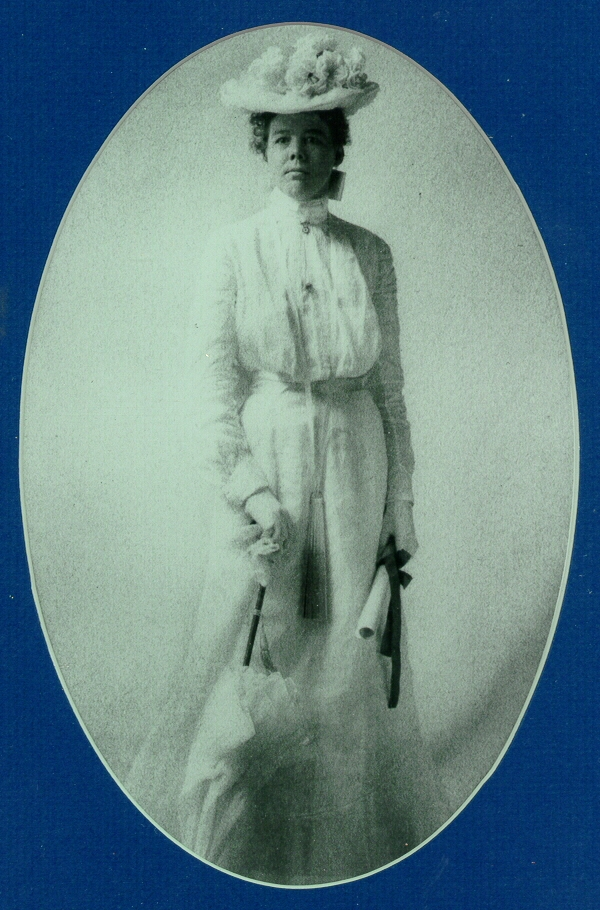
Lyda Conley, lawyer (c. 1902)

- Chip Conley (born 1960), American hotelier
- Kerry Conley (1866–1924), American businessman and politician
- Lyda Conley (1874–1946), American lawyer
- Rosemary Conley (born 1946), English businesswoman, author and broadcaster
- William Henry Conley (1840–1897), American industrialist and philanthropist

=== Entertainment ===
- Arthur Conley (1946–2003), American soul singer
- Bayless Conley, American pastor and television personality
- Brian Conley (born 1961), English comedian
  - The Brian Conley Show (1992–2002)
- Chris Conley (born 1980), American musician
- Clint Conley, American rock and roll musician
- Corinne Conley (born 1929), American actress
- Darlene Conley (1934–2007), Irish-American actress
- David Conley (musician) (born 1953), American bassist
- Earl Thomas Conley (1941–2019), American country music singer and composer
- Eugene Conley (1908–1981), American tenor
- Jack Conley (actor), American actor
- Joe Conley (1928–2013), American actor
- Lige Conley (1897–1937), American actor
- Marjorie Margaret Conley (1931–1959), Australian operatic soprano
- Onest Conley (1906–1989), American film actor
- Renie Conley (1901–1992), American costume designer
- Robert Conley (music producer) (born 1973), American record producer, programmer and engineer
- Shannon Conley, American voice actor, and vocalist

=== Education ===
- Emma Conley (1869–1928), American home economist, textbook author
- J. Michael "Mike" Conley, American teacher (born 1936), see J. Michael Conley Elementary School
- Jean Conley, American teacher (died 1982), see Conley-Caraballo High School

=== Military ===
- Edgar Thomas Conley – Civil War – Pvt. 2nd Md. Inf. C.S.A. KIA 1863
- Edgar Thomas Conley (1874–1956), United States Army, Major General and Adjutant General of the U.S. Army
- Edgar Thomas Conley Jr. (1907–1993), United States Army, Brig. General

=== Politics and law ===
- Thomas Young Conley (1809–1887), Maryland House of Delegates 1868–1870
- Andrew Conley (1880/81–1952), British trade unionist
- Benjamin F. Conley (1815–1886), American politician (Republican)
- Casey Conley, American politician from New Hampshire (Democrat)
- Cait Conley, American politician and national security officer (Democrat)
- Daniel F. Conley, District Attorney for Suffolk County, Massachusetts
- Dean Conley (1946–2010), American politician (Democrat)
- Gerard Conley Sr. (1930–2018), American politician (Democrat)
- Gerard Conley Jr., American lawyer and politician (Democrat)
- John Conley (Wisconsin politician) (1828-?), American politician (Republican)
- William G. Conley (1866–1940), Governor of West Virginia (Republican)
- William M. Conley (born 1956), American judge

=== Religion ===
- James D. Conley (born 1955), American bishop

=== Science ===
- Catharine Conley, NASA's Planetary Protection Officer
- Charles C. Conley (1933–1984), American mathematician
  - Conley index theory, named after Charles Conley
  - Conley–Zehnder theorem, named after Charles Conley and Eduard Zehnder
- Dalton Conley (born 1969), American sociologist
- Frances K. Conley, American Neurologist

=== Sports ===
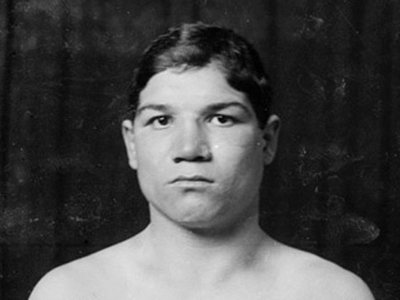
Frankie Conley, boxer (1910)

- Adam Conley (born 1990), American baseball player
- Bob Conley (baseball) (1934–2022), American baseball player
- Cale Conley (born 1992), American racing driver
- Chris Conley (American football) (born 1992), American football wide receiver
- Frankie Conley (1890–1952), American boxer
- Gene Conley (1930–2017), American baseball and basketball player
- Gareon Conley (born 1995), American football cornerback
- Jack Conley (Australian rules footballer) (1920–2008), Australian rules footballer
- Jack Conley (English footballer) (1920–1991), English footballer
- Jason Conley (born 1981), American basketball player
- Jim Conley (born c. 1943), American football player
- Kim Conley (born 1986), American track and field athlete
- Larry Conley (born 1944), American basketball player
- Leonard Conley (born 1968), American football wide receiver and linebacker
- Mike Conley Sr. (born 1962), American triple jumper
- Mike Conley Jr. (born 1987), American basketball player
- Quali Conley (born 2002), American football player
- Scott Conley (American football) (born 1947), American football coach
- Scott Conley (rugby league) (born 1973), Australian rugby league footballer
- Snipe Conley (1894–1978), American baseball pitcher
- Steve Conley (linebacker) (born 1972), American football player
- Steve Conley (running back) (born 1949), American football player
- T. J. Conley (born 1985), American football punter
- Tim Conley (born 1958), American golfer

=== Miscellaneous ===
- Helena Conley (1864–1958), Wyandot activist
- Jim Conley (born c. 1884), see Leo Frank

== See also ==
- Conley Byrd (1925–2014), Justice of the Arkansas Supreme Court
- Conley E. Greear (1887–1966), American politician from Virginia
- Comley (surname)
