= Connolly (surname) =

Connolly (Irish: Ó Conghaile, Ó Coinghalaigh) is a surname of Irish origin. Notable people with the surname include:

- Alan Connolly (cricketer) (born 1939), Australian cricketer
- Amy Connolly, American physicist
- Billy Connolly (born 1942), Scottish comedian
- Brett Connolly (born 1992), Canadian professional ice hockey player
- Brian Connolly (1945–1997), vocalist for band Sweet
- C. P. Connolly (1863–1935), American investigative journalist
- Catherine Connolly (born 1957), Irish politician and current President of Ireland
- Cathy Connolly (born 1956), American professor and politician
- Chris Connolly (born 1963), Australian rules football player, coach and administrator
- Colm Connolly (born 1964), American judge
- Colm Connolly (journalist) (1942–2025), Irish journalist and newsreader
- Cyril Connolly (1903–1974), English man of letters
- Dan Connolly, multiple people
- David Connolly (born 1977), Irish footballer
- Fintan Connolly, Irish film director and screenwriter
- Gary Connolly (born 1971), English Rugby League player
- Gerry Connolly (1950–2025), United States Congressman from Virginia
- Gerry Connolly (comedian) (born 1957), Australian comedian, actor, impressionist and pianist
- Hal Connolly (1931–2010), American hammer thrower
- Harold Connolly (1901–1980), Nova Scotia journalist
- James Connolly, multiple people
- John Connolly, multiple people
- Joseph Connolly, multiple people
- Kevin Connolly (actor) (born 1974), American actor
- Kristen Connolly, an American actress and former professional tennis player
- Mark Connolly, Irish footballer
- Matthew Connolly (born 1987), footballer
- Matthew William Kemble Connolly (1872–1947), British army officer and malacologist
- Maureen Connolly (1934–1969), American professional tennis player
- Maurice Connolly (1877–1921), representative from Iowa
- Megan Connolly, multiple people
- Michael Connolly, multiple people
- Myles Connolly (1897–1964), Writer, Screenwriter, Oscar Nominee (Music for Millions, 1944)
- Nathan Connolly, guitarist for alternative rock band Snow Patrol
- Paddy Connolly (born 1970), Scottish football player and coach
- Pat Connolly, multiple people
- Patricia Connolly, Scottish bioengineer
- Patrick Connolly (1927–2016), Attorney General of Ireland
- Patrick Connolly (footballer, born 1901) (1901–1969), Scottish footballer
- Peter Connolly, multiple people
- Richard B. Connolly (1810–1880), New York politician
- Robert Connolly (born 1967), Australian filmmaker
- Roddy Connolly (1901–1980), Irish socialist
- Susan E. Connolly (born c. 1980), Irish writer
- Sybil Connolly (1921–1998), Irish fashion designer
- Thomas Connolly, multiple people
- Tim Connolly (born 1981), American ice hockey player
- Tyler Connolly, vocalist for band Theory of a Deadman
- Virginia Connolly (1914–1984), American politician
- Walter Connolly (1887–1940), American character actor
- William Connolly, multiple people

== See also ==
- Conley
- Connally (disambiguation)
- Connelly (surname)
- Connolly (disambiguation)
- William Connolley (born 1964), climate modeler and Wikipedian
