= Conneely =

Irish family name

Conneely, from (Mac Conghaile) or (Ó Conghaile), is an Irish family name. Frequent examples of the name can be found in the West of Ireland, particularly in the Connemara area of County Galway. A coastal village in County Galway is named Ballyconneely.

== Overview ==
The original Irish language Gaelic version of the surname is Mac Conghaile, though sometimes rendered Ó Conghaile (due to an 18–19th century shift from Mac to O'). According to an entry in Irish Septs (David Austin Larkin): Mac Conghaile - a sept of Ballyconneely Townland, Parish and Bay, Roundstone, Connemara, Galway.

Two distinct Gaelic surnames Mac an Fhilidh and Mac Conghaile are sometimes translated as “Conneely” – in their earliest anglicised forms were almost indistinguishable. In the sixteenth century Fiants the former is found as MacAnellye and the latter as MacEnelly as well as MacNely and MacNeela. The modern form of Mac Conghaile is Conneely, which is essentially a Connacht name, every one of the 92 births registered in 1890 took place in Connacht, and 89 of these were in County Galway; and the birth indices for 1864 to 1866 show an almost identical preponderance of County Galway registrations. A century earlier it was numerous in south Mayo. Conneely represents an ancient west-Galway sept.

Mac an Fhilidh is the name of an Ulster sept, numerically inferior to Mac Conghaile. The Four Masters describe Giollachriost Mac an Fhilidh, who died in 1509, as a learned poet.

In A chorographical description of West or H-Iar Connaught (1684), Roderic O'Flaherty noted the name's connection to seals:

"Seales.—The coasts of Iar-Connaught and its islands abound with seals. The curious account given of these animals by Martin in his description of the western islands of Scotland...would, in most respects, answer for our western islands and coast; the only difference, perhaps, being, that with us seals are seldom slaughtered or used as food. See the affecting story of the domesticated seal, told by the ingenious author of 'Wild Sports of the West'. Many traditions, connecting these harmless animals with the marvellous, are related along our western shores. Among these there is one of a curious nature, viz., that at some distant period of time, several of the Clan Coneelys (Mac Conghaile), an old family of Iar-Connaught, were, by 'Art magick,' metamorphosed into seals! In some places the story has its believers, who would no more kill a seal, or eat of a slaughtered one, than they would have a human Coneely. It is related as a fact, that this ridiculous story has caused several of the clan to change their name to Conolly."

The principal location of both the O Cadhla and Mac Conneely families was the barony of Ballynahinch, County Galway, but the area comes under the control of the O'Flaherties. The Mac Conneely clan held the Errismore peninsula in Connemara running out to Slyne Head. The village of Ballyconneely (Baile Mhic Conghaile, or Baile 'ic Conghaile) is located here.

Ó Conaola (Ó Conghaola and sometimes also spelt ó Confhaola), are an entirely unrelated family from south County Galway -a toponymic, Hound of Gowla, of the Uí bhFhiachrach Aidne, or possibly Uí Máine:

MacFirbis and the Book of Ballymote says "The seed of Cathal are Meic Con Ghaola s. Muireadhach and Meic Mheic Cathail also."

== DNA Studies ==
The Conneely surname is the subject of a Family Tree DNA study. Preliminary results indicate participants share the SNP A10525 or a subclade downstream from this group and are perhaps related to the O'Flaherties and Muintear Murchadha

Often confused with:

Ó Conghaola (earlier Mac Conghaola)- Conneally or Connelly - Uí bhFhiachrach Aidne, south County Galway
Ó Conghaile - Connelly - Uí bhFhiachrach Muaidhe - a sept located in Killerduf, Doonfeeney Lower, northern County Mayo.
Ó Conghalaigh – (O) Connelly or Connolly – SE County Galway – Síl nAmnchadha Uí Máine (O'Madden)
Ó Conghaile – (O) Connelly – County Fermanagh. Erenaghs. Derrygonnelly (from Irish Doire Ó gConaíle)
Ó Coingheallaigh (earlier: Mac Coingheallaigh) – Connolly, Kangley, Kennelly, Quinnelly – West Cork. Retainers of the O'Donovans
Ó Conghalaigh – (O) Connolly – County Dublin/Meath One of the Four Tribes of Tara. Southern Uí Néill Sil Aeda Slaine. Later Marshal of the MacMahons in County Monaghan.
Mac Conghaile or 'Ac Crollaigh – Crilly – (Sligo)

Other phonetic variants of the abovementioned include Connolley, Connally, Connelly, Conley, Conoley, Connaleigh, Connelay, Kanally, Connerley

Possible early bearers of the surname include Muriertagh McInylley of Galway, "Inquisittio of the duties and rights of St. Nicholas his churche", A.D. 1609., a glower mentioned in the "Nomina Juratorum".
