= CUC =

CUC may refer to:

== Education ==
- Canadian University College, a private Seventh-day Adventist degree-granting institution and teacher's college in Lacombe, Alberta, Canada
- Catholic University College, Kensington, a 19th Century college of higher education
- Ciudad Universitaria de Caracas, the Spanish name of University City of Caracas, a World Heritage Site and the college campus of Universidad Central de Venezuela
- Claremont University Consortium, a group of seven colleges in California, USA
- Columbia Union College, a former name of Washington Adventist University, a liberal arts university located in Takoma Park, Maryland, USA
- Combined Universities in Cornwall, a project to provide higher education in Cornwall, UK
- Communication University of China, a university in Beijing, China
- Concordia University Chicago, a private Lutheran university in River Forest, Illinois, USA

== Organisations ==
- Canadian Unitarian Council, the national body for Unitarian Universalist congregations in Canada
- Canadian Unity Council, a former non-profit organization whose mission was the promotion of Canadian unity
- Caribbean Utilities, a utilities company based in the Cayman Islands
- Comité de Unidad Campesina, the Spanish name for the former Committee for Peasant Unity in Guatemala
- CUC Broadcasting, a former Canadian media company
- CUC International, a former consumer services conglomerate involved in a 1998 accounting scandal
- CUC Software (now Vivendi Games), the software unit of CUC International

== Other ==
- Canadian Ultimate Championships, a national tournament of Ultimate in Canada
- Cuban convertible peso, formerly one of two official currencies in Cuba, by ISO 4217 code
- CUC, the IATA airport code for Camilo Daza International Airport, Cúcuta, Colombia
- CUC, codon for the amino acid leucine
