= Doon Hill =

Extinct volcano in County Galway, Ireland

Coordinates: 53°24′54″N 10°06′55″W

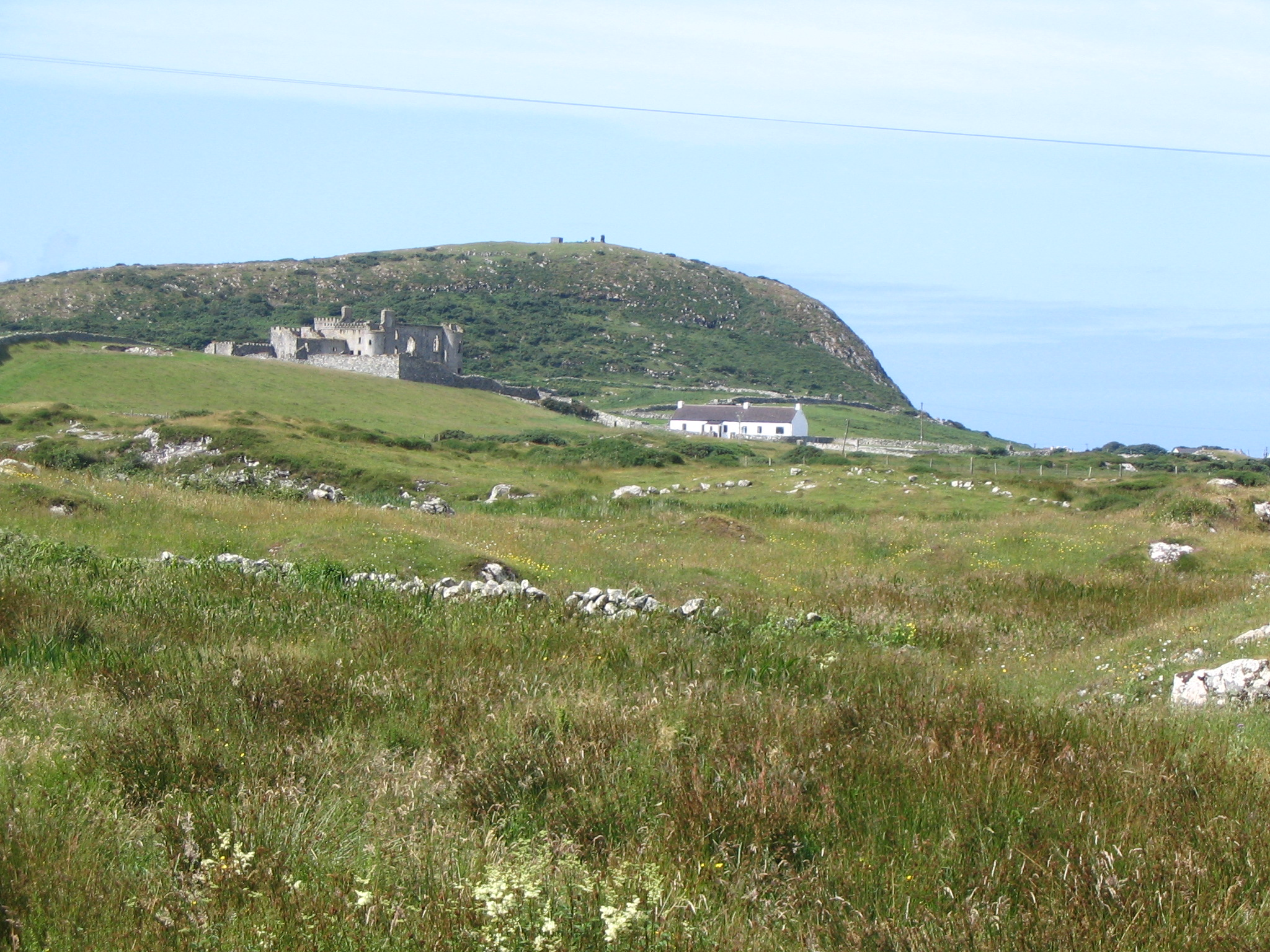
Bunowen Castle and Doon Hill, near Ballyconneely in Connemara

Doon Hill (Irish: Cnoc an Dúin, meaning 'hill of the fort') is a volcanic plug in the townland of Bunowen More, in the barony of Ballynahinch, near Ballyconneely in County Galway, Ireland. The hill, which is 67 m high, is a prominent landscape feature on the Errismore peninsula. Fishermen use Doon Hill as a landmark to guide them into Bunowen Pier at Aillebrack. The Irish name for the hill, dún, means "fortress", possibly indicating an earlier fort on top of the hill.

At the top of Doon Hill are the ruins of a Napoleonic era signal tower (dating to c. 1806) and a concrete watch post dating from the period of The Emergency (WWII).

Nearby, Bunowen Castle was built in the mid-18th century. Built on lands originally associated the O'Flaherty family, following the Cromwellian conquest of Ireland, the lands at Bunowen were "transplanted" to Art Geoghegan, a landowner from County Westmeath. The Geoghegan family rebuilt and extended the original O'Flaherty castle, and remained in the castle until the mid-19th century. The castle was purchased by the Blake family in 1852, for use as a summer home. The castle, now in ruin, is owned by the McDonagh family. Near the castle are the ruins of a medieval church, a cemetery, and a garden.
