= John Connolly =

John or Johnny Connolly may refer to:

== Arts and entertainment ==
- Johnny Connolly (1943/4–2019), Irish folk musician
- John Connolly (author) (born 1968), Irish novelist
- John Connolly (musician) (born 1968), American musician
- Johnny Óg Connolly, Irish folk musician

== Law and politics ==
- John L. Connolly (1871–1933), Canadian politician in Nova Scotia
- John Patrick Connolly (1894–1971), American politician convicted of bribery
- John Joseph Connolly (1906–1982), Canadian parliamentarian and law professor
- John W. Connolly (1911–1981), American politician in Michigan
- John R. Connolly (born 1973), American city councillor in Massachusetts
- John Connolly (Irish politician) (born 1978/79)

== Sports ==
- John Connolly (hurler) (born 1948), Irish hurler
- John Connolly (Scottish footballer) (born 1950), Scottish football player and manager
- John Connolly (rugby union coach) (born 1951), Australian rugby union coach
- John Connolly (Irish footballer) (born 1971), Irish footballer

== Others ==
- John Connolly (loyalist) (1741–1813), American physician
- John Connolly (bishop) (1750–1825), Irish-born bishop of New York
- John Connolly (FBI) (born 1940), American FBI agent
- John P. Connolly (businessman) (1950–2025), British businessman
- John Connolly (blogger), Irish blogger and activist

== See also ==
- John Connally (1917–1993), American politician, Governor of Texas
- John Conlee (born 1946), American country music singer
- Jack Connolly (disambiguation)
- John Connelly (disambiguation)
- John Conolly (disambiguation)
