= David Ritch =

Caymanian lawyer

David Elliott Ritch (born 1951) is a Cayman Islands attorney who has done private and governmental work.

== Legal career ==
David Ritch received his law degree from the University of the West Indies with honours, and was admitted to the bar in 1976 from the Inner Temple, Inns of Court, London, England; in England as Barrister-at-Law and Cayman Islands as Attorney-at-Law. He first worked at the Cayman Islands Courts Office and then moved into the private sector working at law firm Hunter & Hunter.

In 1983, David Ritch founded a private firm, Ritch & Conolly, with stepfather Warren Conolly which at one time became the second-largest Caymanian-owned practice on the island. The firm is rated as one of the top two Caymanian real estate firms by the website Legal500.

== Commercial work ==
He has served as a director of the Caribbean Utilities Company and became the chairman in October 2003. On 19 December 2013, Ritch was appointed non-executive chairman of the CIBC FirstCaribbean International Bank, having been on the bank's board since 2002.

== Government work ==
David Ritch has had appointments on numerous Cayman Islands government boards including chairman of the Planning Appeals Tribunal (1987-1989), member of the Cayman Islands Currency Board (1987-1997), Chairman of the Labour Laws Appeals Tribunal (1988-1991), Chairman of the Caymanian Protection Board (1989-1990), Chairman of the Port Authority (1992-2003, chairman of the Trade and Business Licensing Board (2000-2002) and chairman of the Immigration Board (2002-2003). In 2005, he began as chairman of the Work Permit Board and the Immigration Review Team (a Cabinet committee), where he reduced the large backlog of applications and reformed the immigration law. He resigned his chairmanship of the Work Permit Board in April 2007. Ritch was appointed chairman of the Constitutional Commission, a body promoting good governance, for a period of three years.

== Biography ==
David Ritch is married with three children and was awarded an OBE in 2003 for public service in the Cayman Islands. He is also a Justice of the Peace in George Town.
