= Alysia D. Marino =

American nuclear physicist and researcher

- Born: New York City, New York, USA
- Awards: Presidential Early Career Award for Scientists and Engineers

Academic background
- Education: AB, 1998, Princeton University; MA, 2000, PhD, Physics, 2004, University of California, Berkeley
- Thesis: Evidence for Neutrino Oscillations in the Sudbury Neutrino Observatory (2004)
- Doctoral advisor: Marjorie Shapiro

Academic work
- Institutions: University of Colorado, Boulder
- Main interests: T2K experiment neutrino oscillation
- Website: spot.colorado.edu/~marinoad/

Alysia Diane Marino is an American experimental particle physicist. She is the Jesse L. Mitchell Endowed Chair at the University of Colorado, Boulder. In 2022, Marino was elected a Fellow of the American Physical Society for "major contributions to understanding the physics of neutrino production and interactions, and for leadership in data analysis in the T2K and NA61/SHINE collaborations."

== Early life and education ==
Marino was born in New York City, New York, USA. She graduated as class valedictorian from South Brunswick High School in 1994 and enrolled at Princeton University. During her undergraduate studies, Marino became interested in neutrino physics. Following Princeton, Marino enrolled at the University of California, Berkeley for her master's degree and PhD in physics. Her thesis was titled Evidence for Neutrino Oscillations in the Sudbury Neutrino Observatory. Upon completing her PhD, Marino received the Mitsuyoshi Tanaka Dissertation Award in Experimental Particle Physics for her "contributions to the measurement of neutrino fluxes which conclusively support the hypothesis of flavor oscillation of neutrinos produced in the sun as they travel toward the earth." Marino then accepted post-doc positions at Fermilab's MINOS neutrino experiment and at the University of Toronto working on the T2K experiment.

== Career ==
Marino completed her post-doc positions in 2009 and accepted a faculty position at the University of Colorado, Boulder. As an assistant professor of physics, Marino received a five-year early-career research grant from the United States Department of Energy to fund her research into long-baseline neutrino. The grant enabled her to focus on the characteristics and behavior of neutrinos which eventually led to a massive neutrino generator and detector in Japan. While working with Japanese scientists on the T2K experiment, she collaborated with colleague Eric D. Zimmerman to design and build one of three magnetic horns used to generate neutrino beams. She was also part of the team which discovered a new way in which neutrinos changed forms during flight. In 2011, Marino was a recipient of the Presidential Early Career Award for Scientists and Engineers for her accomplishments in the study of neutrino properties and the "development of diagnostic tools that may be used to help design future neutrino beam facilities, as well as for her outstanding mentoring of graduate students." In 2015, Marino and Zimmerman were among the scientific collaborators who shared the 2016 Breakthrough Prize for Fundamental Physics for the discovery and study of neutrino oscillations.

In 2022, Marino was elected a Fellow of the American Physical Society for "major contributions to understanding the physics of neutrino production and interactions, and for leadership in data analysis in the T2K and NA61/SHINE collaborations."
