= Ó Conghalaigh =

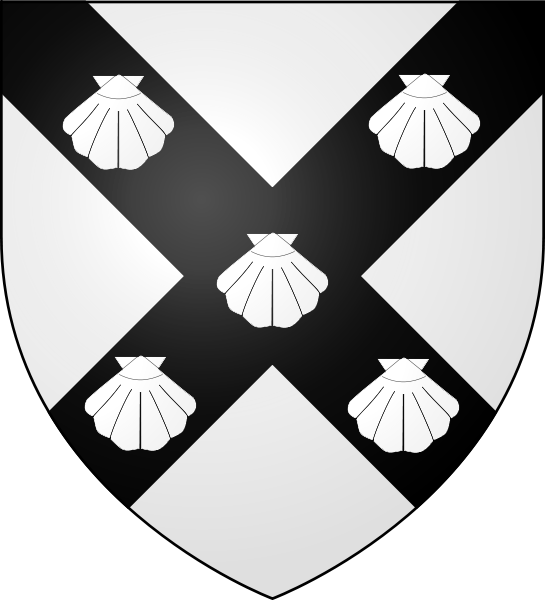
Ó Conghalaigh.

Ó Conghalaigh is a Gaelic-Irish surname. It derives from the forename Conghal, meaning "fierce as a hound". It is often anglicised as Connolly, Connally, Connelly and occasionally as Conley. In modern Irish it may be spelled as Ó Conghaile.

== Overview ==
A number of distinct and unrelated families bore the surname in Gaelic Ireland, and with a number of spelling variants. They included:

- Ó Conghalaigh of Iar Connacht (now County Galway)
- Ó Coingheallaigh in the Kingdom of Desmond (now west County Cork)
- Ó Conghalaigh of Derrygonnelly, Fear Manach (now County Fermanagh)
- Ó Conghalaigh of Airgíalla (now County Monaghan and/or County Meath)
- Ó Conghaile Muirthemne from County Louth

In 1890 the surname was the twenty-third most common in Ireland, with three hundred and eighty-one births of the name, mostly in Ulster. By 1996, the ranking had slipped to thirty-third.

Conneely (Mac Conghaile, Ó Conghaile) was found exclusively in Connacht in 1890, with most occurrences in County Galway, giving Ballyconneely its name and is an entirely separate sept.

== County Monaghan ==
The Ó Conghalaighs of Airgíalla were either a branch of the Southern Uí Néill who removed to Airgíalla, or a branch of the Mac Mathghamna, kings of Airgíalla from the mid-13th century to 1590.

John Grenham says of them "They are first noted as coming to prominence in the fifteenth century and are recorded as having "Chiefs of the Name" up to the 17th century. They were instrumental in organising the native Irish Rebellion of 1641 and, following its failure, lost their power and possessions." Descendants of this family included William Conolly (1662–1729), James Connolly (1870–1916) and Paudge Connolly (born 1953).

== County Galway ==
Descendants of the Ó Conghalaigh of Iar Connacht include the current President of the Republic of Ireland Catherine Connolly , TG4 presenter Eibhlín Ní Chonghaile; musician Johnny Óg Connolly; sportspersons Aislinn Connolly, Joe Connolly; Mayors of Galway Catherine Connolly, Martin Connolly; scribe Micheál Ó Conghaile; writers Micheál Ó Conghaile (writer) and Seán Ó Conghaile.

== See also ==
- Connolly (surname)
- Connelly (surname)
