= Bill Connelly =

Bill Connelly may refer to:

- Bill Connelly (baseball) (1925–1980), American baseball player
- Bill Connelly (soccer), American soccer player
- William A. Connelly (1931–2019), sixth Sergeant Major of the Army

== See also ==
- William Connolly (disambiguation)
- William Connolley (born 1964), software engineer, climatology blogger and Wikipedia editor
