= Mary Evelyn Wood =

Mary Evelyn Wood (1900 – 1978) was a politician and nurse in the Cayman Islands. She was the first woman elected to the Legislative Assembly of the Cayman Islands. After working as a teacher and nurse she entered politics, winning election in 1962 as a National Democratic Party candidate. This came just three years after women had been granted the right to vote. She received the Cayman Islands Certificate and Badge of Honour in 1965 and was designated a national hero in 2011.

== Early life ==
Mary Evelyn Wood, who became known as "Miss Evie", was born in 1900 and was the youngest of six children of Charles and Julietta Wood. While in her 20s she started a small school in her father's home and served as its only teacher. Wood trained as a nurse and worked in her community as a nurse, visiting new and expectant mothers and sick persons. She provided care to victims of a typhoid epidemic in the late 1930s.

== Politics ==
Wood was one of many women who signed a 1957 petition in support of women's suffrage; women gained the vote in 1959. In the same year, she joined the National Democratic Party, serving as treasurer. In 1962, she was elected to the legislative assembly for Bodden Town district. Her campaign had focussed on the women's and non-white vote. She was the first woman elected to the Legislative Assembly of the Cayman Islands. She was not the first woman to serve, however, as Annie Huldah Bodden had been appointed a member of the assembly the previous year. She did not win re-election in 1965.

Wood was also the first woman in the Cayman Islands to serve on a jury.

== Later life ==
In 1965, Wood received the Cayman Islands Certificate and Badge of Honour for her service to the community. Wood died in 1978. In 2011 she was designated as one of the eight national heros of the Cayman Islands.
