= John Conolly (disambiguation) =

John Conolly (1794–1866) was an English physician who was a pioneer in the field of psychiatry.

John Conolly may also refer to:

- John Augustus Conolly (1829–1888), Irish soldier, recipient of the Victoria Cross
- John Richard Arthur Conolly (1870–1945), Australian member of parliament, son of the above
- John H. Conolly (1935–1988), American businessman and politician
- John Conolly, British folk musician

== See also ==
- John Connolly (disambiguation)
- John Connelly (disambiguation)
- John Connally (1917–1993), American politician in Texas
