= 2013 Florida Atlantic Owls baseball team =

American college baseball season

2013 Florida Atlantic Owls baseball

Sun Belt Tournament champions

Chapel Hill Regional, 3–2
- Conference: Sun Belt Conference
- Record: 35-20 (19-11 Sun Belt)
- Head coach: John McCormack
- Home stadium: FAU Baseball Stadium

2013 Sun Belt Conference baseball standings
	Conf.				Overall
Team	W		L	PCT	W		L	PCT
No. 23 Troy ‍†‍‍^{y}	20	–	10	.667	42	–	20	.677
South Alabama ‍†‍‍^{y}	20	–	10	.667	43	–	20	.683
Louisiana–Lafayette ‍‍‍^{y}	19	–	11	.633	43	–	20	.683
No. 24 Florida Atlantic ‍‍‡‍^{y}	19	–	11	.633	42	–	22	.656
Western Kentucky ‍‍‍	16	–	14	.533	28	–	29	.491
Arkansas–Little Rock ‍‍‍	13	–	17	.433	28	–	28	.500
FIU ‍‍‍	13	–	17	.433	26	–	32	.448
Arkansas State ‍‍‍	12	–	18	.400	28	–	31	.475
Middle Tennessee ‍‍‍	11	–	19	.367	28	–	28	.500
Louisiana–Monroe ‍‍‍	7	–	23	.233	18	–	36	.333
† – Conference champion ‡ – Tournament champion y – Invited to the NCAA tournament As of June 4, 2013; Rankings from Collegiate Baseball

The 2013 Florida Atlantic Owls baseball team represented Florida Atlantic University in the sport of baseball for the 2013 college baseball season. The Owls competed in Division I of the National Collegiate Athletic Association (NCAA) and the Sun Belt Conference. They played their home games at FAU Baseball Stadium, on the university's Boca Raton, Florida campus. The team was coached by John McCormack, who was in his fifth season at Florida Atlantic.

== 2013 schedule and results ==
Date	Opponent	Location	Result	Record	Notes
May 22, 2013	vs. Western Kentucky	Lafayette, LA	W 5-4	1-0	Sun Belt Tournament
May 24, 2013	vs. Troy	Lafayette, LA	W 3-1 (10)	2-0	Sun Belt Tournament
May 25, 2013	vs. Arkansas State	Lafayette, LA	W 5-4	3-0	Sun Belt Tournament
May 26, 2013	vs. Louisiana–Lafayette	Lafayette, LA	W 16-8	4-0	Sun Belt Tournament championship
May 31, 2013	vs. Towson	Chapel Hill, NC	L 7-2	0-1	NCAA Regional
Jun 1, 2013	vs. Canisius	Chapel Hill, NC	W 14-6	1-1	NCAA Regional
Jun 2, 2013	vs. Towson	Chapel Hill, NC	W 6-5	2-1	NCAA Regional
Jun 2, 2013	vs. North Carolina	Chapel Hill, NC	W 3-2	3-1	NCAA Regional
Jun 3, 2013	vs. North Carolina	Chapel Hill, NC			NCAA Regional Championship

== Regionals ==
Chapel Hill, NC Regional
1	North Carolina	6
4	Canisius	3
3	Towson	7
2	Florida Atlantic	2
Lower round 1
4	Canisius	6
2	Florida Atlantic	14

Regional
1	North Carolina	8
3	Towson	5
Lower final
3	Towson	5
2	Florida Atlantic	6

Regional Final
1	North Carolina
2	Florida Atlantic

== Awards and honors ==
=== All-Conference ===
- First Team All-Conference Honors
  - SP Austin Gomber (Sophomore)
  - SP Hugh Adams (Senior)
- Second Team All-Conference Honors
  - OF Nathan Pittman (Senior)

== 2013 MLB First-Year Player Draft ==
FAU players selected in the 2013 MLB First-Year Player Draft:
