= Jack Connolly =

Jack Connolly may refer to:

- Jack Connolly (ice hockey, born 1989), American ice hockey player
- Jack Connolly (ice hockey, born 1900), Major League ice hockey player in the 1920s
- Jack Connolly (Gaelic footballer), scored a goal in the 1905 All-Ireland Senior Football Championship final

== See also ==
- John Connolly (disambiguation)
