= William Connolly =

William Connolly may refer to:

- William Connolly (fur trader) (1786–1849), Anglo-Canadian fur trader
- William Connolly (VC) (c. 1816–1891), English recipient of the Victoria Cross
- William Connolly (piper) (1839–1870s), Irish piper
- Bobby Connolly (William Harold Connolly, 1897–1944), American film director and choreographer
- William G. Connolly (1937–2023), co-author of The New York Times style guide
- William E. Connolly (1938–2026), American political theorist and academic
- William M. Connolly (born 1938), justice of the Nebraska Supreme Court
- Billy Connolly (born 1942), Scottish comedian
- William "Egg Boy" Connolly (born 2001), egged Australian Senator Fraser Anning

== See also ==
- William Conley (disambiguation)
- William Conolly (1662–1729), Irish politician
- William James Conolly (died 1754), Irish politician
- William Warren Conolly (1920–2008), Cayman Islands politician
- William Connelly (disambiguation)
- William Connolley (born 1964), British software engineer, writer, and blogger on climatology
