= John Connelly =

John Connelly may refer to:

- John Connelly (baseball) (died 2013), American college baseball coach
- John Connelly (1910s footballer), English footballer
- John Connelly (footballer, born 1938) (1938–2012), English footballer
- John Connelly (historian), American historian
- John Connelly (musician) (born 1962), front man and guitarist with band Nuclear Assault
- John Connelly (prospector) (1860–1928), Australian prospector and mine owner
- John E. Connelly (1925–2009), Pittsburgh casino and riverboat owner
- John R. Connelly (1870–1940), U.S. Representative from Kansas

== See also ==
- John Connally (1917–1993), American politician
- John Connolly (disambiguation)
- John Conolly (disambiguation)
