= Thomas Connelly =

Thomas Connelly may refer to:

== People ==
Listed chronologically by year of birth

- Thomas Connelly (dentist) (born c. 1973), American dentist
- Thomas Jefferson Connelly (1858–1892), Australian storekeeper, solicitor and local politician
- Thomas L. Connelly (1938–1991), American historian and author
- Thomas M. Connelly (born 1952), American business executive
- Tom Connelly (1897–1941), American baseball player

== See also ==
- Tom Connally (1877–1963), United States senator
- Tom Conneely (born 1959), Irish hurler
- Thomas Connolly (disambiguation)
- Thomas Conolly (disambiguation)
