= 2013 Sun Belt Conference baseball tournament =

- Teams: 8
- Format: Double-elimination
- Finals site: M. L. Tigue Moore Field; Lafayette, LA
- Champions: Florida Atlantic (1st title)
- Winning coach: John McCormack (1st title)
- MVP: Brendon Sanger (Florida Atlantic)
- Television: ESPN3/CSS

2013 Sun Belt Conference baseball standings
	Conf.				Overall
Team	W		L	PCT	W		L	PCT
No. 23 Troy ‍†‍‍^{y}	20	–	10	.667	42	–	20	.677
South Alabama ‍†‍‍^{y}	20	–	10	.667	43	–	20	.683
Louisiana–Lafayette ‍‍‍^{y}	19	–	11	.633	43	–	20	.683
No. 24 Florida Atlantic ‍‍‡‍^{y}	19	–	11	.633	42	–	22	.656
Western Kentucky ‍‍‍	16	–	14	.533	28	–	29	.491
Arkansas–Little Rock ‍‍‍	13	–	17	.433	28	–	28	.500
FIU ‍‍‍	13	–	17	.433	26	–	32	.448
Arkansas State ‍‍‍	12	–	18	.400	28	–	31	.475
Middle Tennessee ‍‍‍	11	–	19	.367	28	–	28	.500
Louisiana–Monroe ‍‍‍	7	–	23	.233	18	–	36	.333
† – Conference champion ‡ – Tournament champion y – Invited to the NCAA tournament As of June 4, 2013; Rankings from Collegiate Baseball

The 2013 Sun Belt Conference baseball tournament was held at M. L. Tigue Moore Field on the campus of the University of Louisiana at Lafayette in Lafayette, Louisiana, from May 22 to May 26, 2013. The tournament returned to the double-elimination format used prior to the two year experiment with pool play in 2011 and 2012. Florida Atlantic won their first tournament championship and earned the Sun Belt Conference's automatic bid to the 2013 NCAA Division I baseball tournament. Florida Atlantic joined the conference in 2006, and left for Conference USA after the 2013 season.

== Seeding ==
The top eight teams (based on conference results) from the conference earned invites to the tournament. The teams were seeded based on conference winning percentage before playing a two bracket, double-elimination tournament. The winner of each bracket then played a championship final. Troy claimed the top seed over South Alabama and Louisiana–Lafayette earned the third seed over Western Kentucky by tiebreaker.

Team	W	L	Pct.	GB	Seed
Troy	20	10	.667	–	1
South Alabama	20	10	.667	–	2
Louisiana–Lafayette	19	11	.633	1	3
Florida Atlantic	19	11	.633	1	4
Western Kentucky	16	14	.533	4	5
FIU	14	17	.452	6.5	6
Arkansas–Little Rock	13	18	.419	7.5	7
Arkansas State	12	18	.400	8	8
Middle Tennessee	11	19	.366	9	–
Louisiana–Monroe	7	23	.233	13	–

== Results ==
First round
1	Troy	3
8	Arkansas State	2
4	Florida Atlantic	5
5	Western Kentucky	4
8	Arkansas State	10
5	Western Kentucky	4
3	Louisiana–Lafayette	9
6	FIU	6
2	South Alabama	10
7	Arkansas–Little Rock	2
6	FIU	4
7	Arkansas-Little Rock	3

Second round
1	Troy	1
4	Florida Atlantic	3
1	Troy	2
8	Arkansas State	3
3	Louisiana-Lafayette	9
2	South Alabama	2
2	South Alabama	7
6	FIU	6

Semifinals
4	Florida Atlantic	5	—
8	Arkansas State	4	—
3	Louisiana Lafayette	12	—
2	South Alabama	2	—

Final
4	Florida Atlantic	16
3	Louisiana Lafayette	8

== All-Tournament Team ==
The following players were named to the All-Tournament Team.

Name	School
Logan Pierce	Troy
Edwin Rios	FIU
John Koch	Arkansas State
Alex Potts	Arkansas State
Anthony Izzio	South Alabama
Nick Zaharion	South Alabama
Dex Kjerstad	Louisiana–Lafayette
Austin Robichaux	Louisiana–Lafayette
Jace Conrad	Louisiana–Lafayette
Ryan Wilson	Louisiana–Lafayette
Hugh Adams	Florida Atlantic
Mark Nelson	Florida Atlantic
Geoff Jimenez	Florida Atlantic

=== Most Outstanding Player ===
Brendon Sanger was named Tournament Most Outstanding Player. Sanger played for Florida Atlantic.
