= Connally =

Connally may refer to:

== People ==
- John Connally (1917–1993), 39th Governor of Texas (1963-1969); 61st U.S. Secretary of Treasury
- Merrill Connally (1921–2001), American film actor, county administrative judge, and rancher
- Nellie Connally (1919–2006), First Lady of Texas from 1963 to 1969
- Tom Connally (1877–1963), American politician
- Wayne Connally (1923–2000), American politician and rancher
- Connally Edozien (born 1978), Nigerian soccer player
- Connally Findlay Trigg (1847–1907), Confederate serviceman and US congressman
- Connally Findlay Trigg (judge) (1810–1880), United States federal judge

== Places ==
- Connally Building, an Atlanta, Georgia hotel built in 1916
- Connally High School (Waco, Texas), a public high school
- Connally Independent School District, a public school district based in the northernmost part of Waco, Texas
- John B. Connally Unit, a maximum-security prison for males located in unincorporated Karnes County, Texas

== Other ==
- Connally Hot Oil Act of 1935, US legislation
- Connally v. General Construction Co., a United States Supreme Court case concerning the Fifth Amendment's due process doctrine
- Interstate 410 (also the Connally Loop), a loop route of Interstate 10 around San Antonio, Texas

== See also ==
- Connolly (disambiguation)
- Connelly (disambiguation)
