= Pat Connolly =

Pat Connolly is the name of:

- Pat Connolly (musician), American musician with The Surfaris
- Pat Connolly (footballer) (born 1941), English footballer
- Pat Connolly (announcer) (1928–2012), Canadian sports broadcaster
- Pat Daniels (married name Connolly, born 1943), track and field coach

== See also ==
- Paddy Connolly (born 1970), Scottish former footballer
- Patrick Connolly (1927–2016), Attorney General of Ireland
- Patrick Connolly (footballer, born 1901) (1901–1969), Scottish footballer
- Connolly (surname)
