= Johnny Connolly =

Irish musician

Johnny Connolly was an Irish musician from Connemara, and one of Ireland's most prominent players of the melodeon (one-row button accordion). In a 2008 TG4 interview, Connolly described how he first took up the instrument: his parents left the children home at Inis Bearacháin to go watch currach racing, and Connolly's sister showed him where their parents kept their melodeon locked up, which he commenced to play for the rest of the day, beginning his ties to the instrument. Connolly has been described as "king of the melodeon", the best player of his generation, and catalyst for increased interest in the single-row melodeon in Irish music.

He died in 2019, aged 75.

Connolly's son, Johnny Óg Connolly, plays the Irish button accordion.

== Discography ==
- An tOileán Aerach (1993)
- Drioball na Fáinleoige (1998)
- An Mileoidean Scaoilte (2004)
