= Thomas Connolly =

Thomas Connolly may refer to:

== People ==
Listed chronologically by year of birth

- Thomas-Louis Connolly (1814–1876), Canadian Roman Catholic archbishop
- Tom Connolly (umpire) (1870–1961), English-born American baseball umpire
- Tom Connolly (third baseman) (1892–1966), American baseball player
- Thomas Arthur Connolly (1899–1991), American archbishop of Seattle (1951–1975)
- Thomas F. Connolly (1909–1996), United States Navy admiral, gymnast and Olympic medalist in rope climbing
- Thomas Joseph Connolly (1922–2015), American bishop of the Roman Catholic Church
- Thomas Maximus Connolly III (born 1946), American politician in California
- Thomas J. Connolly (born 1958), American attorney and activist in Maine

== Other uses ==
- "Tom Connolly" (The Blacklist), a 2015 episode of the American crime drama The Blacklist

== See also ==
- Thomas Conolly (disambiguation)
- Thomas Connelly (disambiguation)
- Tom Connally (1877–1963), United States senator
- Connolly (surname)
