= James Connolly (disambiguation) =

James Connolly (1868–1916) was an Irish socialist leader.

James Connolly or Jim Connolly may also refer to:

- James Connolly (runner) (1900–1940), American athlete in the 1920 and 1924 Olympics
- James Connolly (Australian politician) (1869–1962), Australian politician
- James Connolly (rugby union) (born 1993), Irish rugby union player
- James Connolly (stonemason) (died 1852), Irish stonemason and builder of Adare Manor
- James A. Connolly (1843–1914), United States representative from Illinois
- James Bell Connolly (1892–1970), Australian politician
- James Brendan Connolly (1868–1957), American athlete in the 1896 and 1900 Olympics, and later author
- James G. Connolly (1886–1952), lieutenant governor of Rhode Island
- James J. Connolly (1881–1952), United States representative from Pennsylvania
- James L. Connolly (1909–1982), Canadian politician
- James Louis Connolly (1894–1986), American prelate of the Roman Catholic Church
- James P. Connolly, American comedian and TV/radio host
- Jimmy Connolly (footballer), Ireland footballer
- Jim Connolly (illustrator) (born 1978), British artist
- James Connolly (footballer) (born 2001), Welsh footballer
- Jim Connolly (decathlete) (born 1962), American decathlete, winner of the 1987 decathlon at the NCAA Division I Outdoor Track and Field Championships
- James Connolly, alias used by Reginald Dunne, hanged for the murder of Field Marshal Sir Henry Wilson

== See also ==
- Connolly (surname)
- James Connelly (disambiguation)
