= Aillebrack =

Townland in Connemara, County Galway, Ireland

Aillebrack An Aill Bhreac
- Townland
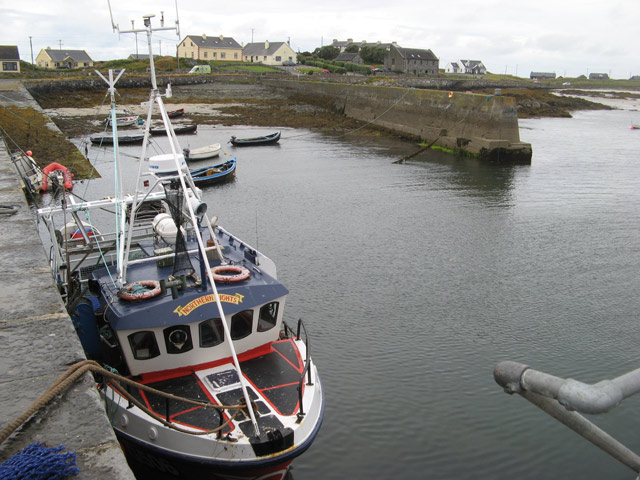
- Bunowen Pier in Aillebrack townland

- Location in Ireland
- Coordinates: 53.41773°N 10.11902°W
- Country: Ireland
- Province: Connacht
- County: County Galway
- Irish grid reference: L589418

Aillebrack (Irish: An Aill Bhreac, meaning 'the speckled cliff') is a townland on the west coast of Connemara in County Galway, Ireland. As of the 2011 census, the townland had a population of 122 people.

== Geography ==
Situated in the civil parish of Ballindoon, in the historical barony of Ballynahinch, Aillebrack is approximately 2.6 square kilometres (1.0 mi^{2}) in area.

Lough Aillebrack, a "hard water" lake within the Slyne Head Peninsula Special Area of Conservation, is nearby. The area is overlooked by Doon Hill.

The nearest town is Clifden, 10 km to the north-east.

== History ==
Evidence of ancient settlement in the townland includes several midden and holy well sites. The latter includes a well, known as the "Well of the Seven Daughters", near Doon Hill. Bunowen Pier in Aillebrack was built c. 1820.

There is a memorial stone and plaque in Aillebrack which commemorates the crew of a U.S. Navy Liberator aircraft that crashed off the nearby coast in 1944.

== Education ==
The local national (primary) school, Aillebrack National School, is situated near the village of Ballyconneely. Also known as St. Caillín's National School (after Saint Caillín), it operates from a two-room school building which was built in 1945.

The school, which was first built in the late 19th century, originally had just one room. This school building was destroyed in a fire in 1940. While the school was being rebuilt, lessons were moved to two rooms in nearby Bunowen Castle. At that time, the castle was in a poor condition and "described as cold and draughty". The school was rebuilt and reopened in 1945. When the school at nearby Dunloughan closed in 1967, its 15 pupils transferred to Aillebrack school. As of 2010, there were 27 children enrolled in Aillebrack National School.

== Transport ==
As at 2024, there is a Local Link bus on Thursdays to Clifden.
