= James Connelly =

James Connelly may refer to:

- James Connelly (ice hockey) (born 1932), Canadian ice hockey player, silver medalist in the 1960 Winter Olympics
- James Alexander Connelly Jr. (1894–1944), American World War I flying ace
- James Pearse Connelly (born 1980), production designer, art director, and set decorator

== See also ==
- James Connolly (disambiguation)
