= Comley (surname) =

Comley is a surname. Notable people with the name include:

- Bonnie Comley, American screen producer, writer and performer
- James Comley (born 1991), English soccer player
- John M. Comley (1895–1974), Justice of the Connecticut Supreme Court
- Kathleen Comley, British Paralympic archer
- Larry Comley (1939–2006), American professional basketball player
- Rick Comley (born 1947), American collegiate ice hockey player and head coach

== See also ==
- Conley
