= Megan Connolly =

Megan Connolly may refer to:

- Megan Connolly (actress) (1974–2001), Australian actress
- Megan Connolly (footballer) (born 1997), Irish professional footballer

== See also ==
- Connolly (surname)
