= Thomas Conolly =

Thomas Conolly may refer to:

- Thomas Conolly (1738–1803), MP for Malmesbury, Chichester, Ballyshannon and County Londonderry
- Thomas Conolly (1823–1876), MP for Donegal

== See also ==
- Thomas Connolly (disambiguation)
- Thomas Connelly (disambiguation)
