= Joe Connolly =

Joe or Joseph Connolly may refer to:

- Joe Connolly (1910s outfielder) (1884–1943), Major League Baseball outfielder from 1913 to 1916
- Joe Connolly (1920s outfielder) (1894–1960), Major League Baseball outfielder from 1921 to 1924
- Joe Connolly (hurler) (born 1956), Irish hurler, board member of Irish television broadcaster TG4
- Joseph Connolly (Irish politician) (1885–1961), Irish Fianna Fáil politician
- Joseph Connolly (author) (born 1950), British journalist, novelist, non-fiction writer and bibliophile
- Joseph Connolly (architect) (1840–1904), Irish Canadian architect, born in Limerick, Ireland
- Joseph Edward Connolly (1904–1942), U.S. Marine awarded the Navy Cross
- Joseph M. Connolly (1924–2007), American police detective and politician in the Massachusetts House of Representatives
- Joseph E. Connolly (1887–1973), Canadian politician in the Legislative Assembly of New Brunswick
- Joseph Connolly, treasurer of Norfolk County, Massachusetts
- Joe Connolly (athlete), Scottish runner
- SS Joseph V. Connolly, a Liberty ship

== See also ==
- Joe Connelly (disambiguation)
