= William Conley =

William, Willy or Will Conley may refer to:

- William G. Conley (1866–1940), American politician who served as Governor of West Virginia
- William Conley Jr. (born 1953), American state legislator in Rhode Island
- William Henry Conley (1840–1897), American industrialist and philanthropist
- William M. Conley (born 1956), American federal judge
- Willy Conley (born 1958), American photographer

== See also ==
- William Connolly (disambiguation)
