= Joe Connelly =

Joe Connelly may refer to:

- Joe Connelly (musician) (born 1965), barbershop quartet lead singer
- Joe Connelly (producer) (1917–2003), Hollywood film and television producer, director and writer
- Joe Connelly (writer), New York City contemporary writer

== See also ==
- Joe Connolly (disambiguation)
