= Annie Huldah Bodden =

Caymanian politician (1908–1989)

Serve in the Legislative Assembly of the Cayman Islands,
- In office 1961–1964

Personal details
- Born: 21 April 1908
- Died: 15 June 1989 (aged 81)
- Occupation: Caymanian civil servant, Lawyer, and Politician

Annie Huldah Bodden OBE (21 April 1908 – 15 June 1989) was a Caymanian civil servant, lawyer, and politician. She was the first woman to serve in the Legislative Assembly of the Cayman Islands, of which she was a member from 1961 to 1964 and from 1965 to 1984.

== Early life ==
Bodden grew up in George Town, Grand Cayman. She left school at the age of 15 to work as a secretary to a local justice of the peace. She taught herself book-keeping, and in 1939 began working for the Cayman Islands Motor Boat Company (Cimboco); she eventually became the company's manager. In 1949, Bodden was appointed chief government auditor, the first woman to hold position. She resigned in 1959 and the following year qualified as an attorney-at-law, the first Caymanian woman to do so.

== Politics ==
Bodden was appointed to the Legislative Assembly in 1961, as one of the nominees of the governor; the legislature was not yet fully elective at that time. Her three-year term expired in 1964, but the following year she re-entered parliament as an elected member in the George Town constituency – she was not the first woman to be elected, as Mary Evelyn Wood had been returned in Bodden Town in 1962. Bodden was re-elected at every subsequent election until her retirement in 1984. She was one of the leaders of a protest march against the Land Development (Interim Control) Bill in 1970, which prompted the governor to (unsuccessfully) request a British warship to be sent to monitor the situation. She also campaigned against the re-introduction of judicial corporal punishment for juveniles in 1967, lobbying for the maximum number of strokes in canings to be reduced to six.

== Honours ==
Bodden was made an Officer of the Order of the British Empire (OBE) in the 1976 New Year Honours, the first Caymanian woman to receive the honour. A lecture series in her name was inaugurated in 2001, and she has also appeared on the Cayman Islands Postal Service's "Pioneers" series of stamps.
