= 2013 Louisiana–Lafayette Ragin' Cajuns baseball team =

American college baseball season

2013 Louisiana–Lafayette Ragin' Cajuns baseball

Baton Rouge Regionals appearance
- Conference: Sun Belt Conference
- Record: 43-20 (19-11 SBC)
- Head coach: Tony Robichaux (19th season)
- Assistant coaches: Anthony Babineaux; Matt Deggs
- Home stadium: M. L. Tigue Moore Field

2013 Sun Belt Conference baseball standings
	Conf.				Overall
Team	W		L	PCT	W		L	PCT
No. 23 Troy ‍†‍‍^{y}	20	–	10	.667	42	–	20	.677
South Alabama ‍†‍‍^{y}	20	–	10	.667	43	–	20	.683
Louisiana–Lafayette ‍‍‍^{y}	19	–	11	.633	43	–	20	.683
No. 24 Florida Atlantic ‍‍‡‍^{y}	19	–	11	.633	42	–	22	.656
Western Kentucky ‍‍‍	16	–	14	.533	28	–	29	.491
Arkansas–Little Rock ‍‍‍	13	–	17	.433	28	–	28	.500
FIU ‍‍‍	13	–	17	.433	26	–	32	.448
Arkansas State ‍‍‍	12	–	18	.400	28	–	31	.475
Middle Tennessee ‍‍‍	11	–	19	.367	28	–	28	.500
Louisiana–Monroe ‍‍‍	7	–	23	.233	18	–	36	.333
† – Conference champion ‡ – Tournament champion y – Invited to the NCAA tournament As of June 4, 2013; Rankings from Collegiate Baseball

The 2013 Louisiana–Lafayette Ragin' Cajuns baseball team represented the University of Louisiana at Lafayette in the 2013 NCAA Division I baseball season. The Ragin' Cajuns played their home games at M. L. Tigue Moore Field and were led by the nineteenth year head coach Tony Robichaux.

== Preseason ==
=== Sun Belt Conference Coaches Poll ===
The Sun Belt Conference Coaches Poll was released on February 11, 2013. Louisiana-Lafayette was picked to finish eighth in the Sun Belt with 39 votes and 1 first-place vote.

Coaches poll
Predicted finish	Team	Votes (1st place)
1	Florida Atlantic	89 (5)
2	FIU	85 (1)
3	South Alabama	67
4	Troy	61
5	Arkansas State	60 (1)
6	Middle Tennessee	56 (1)
7	Western Kentucky	42
8	Louisiana-Lafayette	39 (1)
9	Louisiana-Monroe	31 (1)
10	Arkansas-Little Rock	20

=== Preseason All-Sun Belt team ===
- Chance Cleveland (UALR, SR, Pitcher)
- Austin Gomber (FAU, SO, Pitcher)
- Michael Ellis (FIU, JR, Pitcher)
- Johnathan Frebis (MTSU, SO, Pitcher)
- Nate Hill (TROY, SR, Pitcher)
- Aramis Garcia (FIU, SO, Catcher)
- Mark Nelson (FAU, SR, 1st Base)
- Logan Kirkland (USA, SO, 2nd Base)
- Dustin Jones (ARST, JR, Shortstop)
- Logan Pierce (TROY, SR, 3rd Base)
- Logan Uxa (ARST, SR, Outfield)
- Trent Miller (MTSU, JR, Outfield)
- Danny Collins (TROY, JR, Outfield)
- Whitt Dorsey (USA, SR, Designated Hitter)
- Jordan Patterson (USA, JR, Utility)

== Roster ==
2013 Louisiana-Lafayette Ragin' Cajuns roster
Pitchers: 1 Cord Cockrell - Sophomore; 12 Austin Robichaux - Sophomore; 14 Chase Traffica - Redshirt Junior; 17 Kody Smith - Sophomore; 20 Cody Boutte - Junior; 24 Chris Griffitt - Senior; 25 Connor Toups - Freshman; 26 Matt Hicks - Junior; 30 Ben Carter - Redshirt Junior; 33 Nick Zaunbrecher - Freshman; 34 Ben Frith - Senior; 35 Matt Plitt - Junior; 37 Kendall Mayer - Senior; 39 Lance Quebodeaux - Freshman; Catchers: 6 Nick Thurman - Freshman; 11 Michael Strentz - Redshirt Sophomore; 29 Nathan Zavos - Junior; 42 Alex Stringer - Freshman	Infielders: 2 Sam Carriere - Junior; 4 Blake Trahan - Freshman; 5 Brenn Conrad - Freshman; 8 Logan Preston - Sophomore; 9 Tyler Girouard - Sophomore; 10 Joe Robbins - Freshman; 19 Jace Conrad - Sophomore; 32 Chase Compton - Junior; Outfielders: 7 Ryan Leonards - Junior; 13 Caleb Adams - Sophomore; 15 Dylan Butler - Sophomore; 21 Dex Kjerstad - Junior; 23 Ryan Wilson - Junior; 27 Seth Harrison - Junior

=== Coaching staff ===
2013 Louisiana-Lafayette Ragin' Cajuns coaching staff
- Tony Robichaux – Head Coach – 19th year
- Anthony Babineaux – Associate Head Coach – 19th year
- Matt Deggs – Assistant Head Coach – 2nd year
- Chris Domingue – Director of Baseball Operations – 11th year

== Schedule and results ==
Legend
	Louisiana-Lafayette win
	Louisiana-Lafayette loss
	Postponement
**Bold**	Louisiana-Lafayette team member

2013 Louisiana–Lafayette Ragin' Cajuns baseball game log
Regular season (38–17)

February (8–2)
Date	Opponent	Rank	Site/stadium	Score	Win	Loss	Save	TV	Attendance	Overall record	SBC record
Feb. 15	Central Michigan		M. L. Tigue Moore Field • Lafayette, LA	**W** 12-6	**Cockrell** (1–0)	Trowbridge (0–1)	None		2,209	1-0	
Feb. 16	Central Michigan		M. L. Tigue Moore Field • Lafayette, LA	**W** 5-3	**Boutte** (1–0)	Kaminska (0–1)	**Hicks** (1)			2-0	
Feb. 16	Central Michigan		M. L. Tigue Moore Field • Lafayette, LA	**W** 5-4	**Hicks** (1–0)	Renzi (0–1)	None		1,993	3-0	
Feb. 17	Central Michigan		M. L. Tigue Moore Field • Lafayette, LA	**L** 2-10	Dodridge (1–0)	**Wilson** (0–1)	None		1,974	3-1	
Feb. 20	Northwestern State		M. L. Tigue Moore Field • Lafayette, LA	**W** 12-3	**Cockrell** (2–0)	Krebs (1-1)	None		1,837	4-1	
Feb. 22	UTSA		M. L. Tigue Moore Field • Lafayette, LA	**W** 18-6	**Cockrell** (3–0)	Kraft (0–1)	None		1,877	5–1	
Feb. 23	UTSA		M. L. Tigue Moore Field • Lafayette, LA	**W** 9-6	**Boutte** (2–0)	Hartson (0–1)	**Hicks** (2)		2,040	6-1	
Feb. 24	UTSA		M. L. Tigue Moore Field • Lafayette, LA	**W** 2-1	**Robichaux** (1–0)	Sharp (0–1)	**Hicks** (3)		2,058	7-1	
Feb. 26	No. 4 LSU		M. L. Tigue Moore Field • Lafayette, LA	**L** 2-11	Glenn (1–0)	**Smith** (0–1)	None		3,790	7-2	
Feb. 27	Nicholls State		M. L. Tigue Moore Field • Lafayette, LA	**W** 5-1	**Hicks** (2–0)	Langston (0–1)	None		1,766	8-2	

March (11–6)
Date	Opponent	Rank	Site/stadium	Score	Win	Loss	Save	TV	Attendance	Overall record	SBC record
Mar. 1	Sacred Heart		M. L. Tigue Moore Field • Lafayette, LA	**W** 4-2	**Traffica** (1–0)	Maguire (0–1)	**Hicks** (4)		1,724	9-2	
Mar. 2	Sacred Heart		M. L. Tigue Moore Field • Lafayette, LA	**W** 8-2	**Boutte** (3–0)	Leiningen (0–1)	None		1,711	10-2	
Mar. 3	Sacred Heart		M. L. Tigue Moore Field • Lafayette, LA	**W** 4-3	**Wilson** (1-1)	Stoddard (0–1)	**Hicks** (5)		1,846	11-2	
Mar. 5	New Orleans		M. L. Tigue Moore Field • Lafayette, LA	Game postponed due to mid-term exams being taken by the University of New Orleans							
Mar. 8	at Southern Miss		Pete Taylor Park • Hattiesburg, MS	**L** 2-9	Pierce (4–0)	**Traffica** (1-1)	None		3,009	11-3	
Mar. 9	at Southern Miss		Pete Taylor Park • Hattiesburg, MS	**W** 13-4	**Plitt** (1–0)	Drehoff (1-1)	**Cockrell** (1)		3,225	12-3	
Mar. 10	at Southern Miss		Pete Taylor Park • Hattiesburg, MS	**W** 9-1	**Robichaux** (2–0)	Fisk (0–1)	None		3,003	13-3	
Mar. 15	Louisiana-Monroe		M. L. Tigue Moore Field • Lafayette, LA	**W** 9-2	**Wilson** (2–1)	Taylor (1–2)	None		2,325	14-3	1–0
Mar. 16	Louisiana-Monroe		M. L. Tigue Moore Field • Lafayette, LA	**W** 5-2	**Robichaux** (3–0)	Wine (2–3)	**Hicks** (6)		2,333	15-3	2–0
Mar. 17	Louisiana-Monroe		M. L. Tigue Moore Field • Lafayette, LA	**W** 3-2	**Boutte** (4–0)	Dumaine (1-1)	**Hicks** (7)		2,380	16-3	3–0
Mar. 19	Southern		M. L. Tigue Moore Field • Lafayette, LA	**W** 11-6	**Traffica** (2–1)	Godoy (0–2)	None		1,559	17-3	
Mar. 22	at Middle Tennessee		Reese Smith Jr. Field • Murfreesboro, TN	**L** 5-12	Adkins (4–2)	**Cockrell** (3–1)	None		758	17-4	3–1
Mar. 23	at Middle Tennessee		Reese Smith Jr. Field • Murfreesboro, TN	**L** 5-7	Frebis (3–2)	**Robichaux** (3–1)	Mittura (5)		815	17-5	3–2
Mar. 24	at Middle Tennessee		Reese Smith Jr. Field • Murfreesboro, TN	**L** 3-9	Curtis (4–2)	**Boutte** (4–1)	None		628	17-6	3-3
Mar. 26	at Southeastern Louisiana		Pat Kenelly Diamond at Alumni Field • Hammond, LA	**W** 9-6	**Traffica** (3–1)	Manuel (2-2)	**Hicks** (8)		1,212	18-6	
Mar. 29	at Western Kentucky		Nick Denes Field • Bowling Green, KY	**L** 9-10 (11 inn)	Tompkins (3-3)	**Smith** (0–2)	None		184	18-7	3–4
Mar. 30	at Western Kentucky		Nick Denes Field • Bowling Green, KY	**L** 0-3	Edwards (2–1)	**Robichaux** (3–2)	None			18-8	3–5
Mar. 30	at Western Kentucky		Nick Denes Field • Bowling Green, KY	**W** 8-6	**Boutte** (5–1)	Bado (2–3)	**Harrison** (1)		324	19-8	4–5

April (12–7)
Date	Opponent	Rank	Site/stadium	Score	Win	Loss	Save	TV	Attendance	Overall record	SBC record
Apr. 2	McNeese State		M. L. Tigue Moore Field • Lafayette, LA	**W** 8-5	**Hicks** (3–0)	Parke (2–1)	**Harrison** (2)		2,475	20-8	
Apr. 5	Troy		M. L. Tigue Moore Field • Lafayette, LA	**W** 7-6	**Wilson** (3–1)	Hicks (3–2)	**Harrison** (3)		2,253	21-8	5-5
Apr. 6	Troy		M. L. Tigue Moore Field • Lafayette, LA	**W** 9-2	**Robichaux** (4–2)	Starling (4–3)	None		2,219	22-8	6–5
Apr. 7	Troy		M. L. Tigue Moore Field • Lafayette, LA	**L** 4-10	McCain (6–0)	**Boutte** (5–2)	None		2,224	22-9	6-6
Apr. 9	Tulane		M. L. Tigue Moore Field • Lafayette, LA	**L** 5-7	LeBlanc (1–2)	**Traffica** (3–2)	None		2,144	22-10	
Apr. 10	at Northwestern State		H. Alvin Brown–C. C. Stroud Field • Natchitoches, LA	**W** 12-0	**Plitt** (2–0)	Crain (0–1)	None		232	23-10	
Apr. 12	at Arkansas-Little Rock		Gary Hogan Field • Little Rock, AR	**W** 9-2	**Robichaux** (5–2)	Cleveland (4–5)	None		209	24-10	7–6
Apr. 13	at Arkansas-Little Rock		Gary Hogan Field • Little Rock, AR	**L** 2-7	Huffman (4–2)	**Wilson** (3–2)	Moritz (5)		274	24-11	7-7
Apr. 14	at Arkansas-Little Rock		Gary Hogan Field • Little Rock, AR	**W** 15-10	**Mayer** (1–0)	Moritz (1–2)	None		261	25-11	8–7
Apr. 16	at Nicholls State		Ben Meyer Diamond at Ray E. Didier Field • Thibodaux, LA	**L** 3-4	Picciola (1–2)	**Cockrell** (3–2)	None		619	25-12	
Apr. 19	Florida Atlantic		M. L. Tigue Moore Field • Lafayette, LA	**W** 5-3	**Robichaux** (6–2)	Gomber (4–3)	**Hicks** (9)		2,369	26-12	9–7
Apr. 20	Florida Atlantic		M. L. Tigue Moore Field • Lafayette, LA	**L** 4-5	Logan (4–0)	**Hicks** (3–1)	Adams (12)		2,628	26-13	9–8
Apr. 21	Florida Atlantic		M. L. Tigue Moore Field • Lafayette, LA	**W** 12-2 (7 inn)	**Boutte** (6–2)	Rhodes (3–2)	None		2,206	27-13	10–8
Apr. 23	at McNeese State		Joe Miller Ballpark • Lake Charles, LA	**W** 11-9	**Cockrell** (4–2)	Williams (1-1)	**Hicks** (10)		732	28-13	
Apr. 24	Southeastern Louisiana		M. L. Tigue Moore Field • Lafayette, LA	**W** 6-3	**Plitt** (3–0)	Kennel (4–3)	**Wilson** (1)		1,741	29-13	
Apr. 26	at FIU		FIU Baseball Stadium • Miami, FL	**L** 6-7 (11 inn)	Davis (6–2)	**Wilson** (3-3)	None		383	29-14	10–9
Apr. 27	at FIU		FIU Baseball Stadium • Miami, FL	**W** 9-1	**Boutte** (7–2)	Franco (5–2)	None		305	30-14	11–9
Apr. 28	at FIU		FIU Baseball Stadium • Miami, FL	**W** 14-4 (8 inn)	**Smith** (1–2)	Seibold (2–3)	**Carter** (1)		263	31-14	12–9
Apr. 30	at Houston		Cougar Field • Houston, TX	**L** 4-6	Lemoine (6–3)	**Plitt** (3–1)	Wellbrock (7)		1,197	31-15	

May (7–2)
Date	Opponent	Rank	Site/stadium	Score	Win	Loss	Save	TV	Attendance	Overall record	SBC record
May 3	Arkansas State		M. L. Tigue Moore Field • Lafayette, LA	**W** 11-4	**Robichaux** (7–2)	Wright (5–4)	None		2,019	32-15	13–9
May 4	Arkansas State		M. L. Tigue Moore Field • Lafayette, LA	**W** 14-6	**Boutte** (8–2)	Wallace (4–2)	**Smith** (1)		2,266	33-15	14–9
May 5	Arkansas State		M. L. Tigue Moore Field • Lafayette, LA	**W** 8-1	**Carter** (1–0)	Woodhouse (0–1)	None		2,082	34-15	15–9
May 11	No. 20 South Alabama		M. L. Tigue Moore Field • Lafayette, LA	**L** 6-9	Izzio (1–0)	**Wilson** (3–4)	Stamey (4)		2,821	34-16	15–10
May 12	No. 20 South Alabama		M. L. Tigue Moore Field • Lafayette, LA	**L** 5-9	Bell (6–0)	**Boutte** (8–3)	None			34-17	15–11
May 12	No. 20 South Alabama		M. L. Tigue Moore Field • Lafayette, LA	**W** 17-7 (7 inn)	**Frith** (1–0)	Cecil (3–2)	None		2,243	35-17	16–11
May 16	at Louisiana-Monroe		Warhawk Field • Monroe, LA	**W** 5-4 (10 inn)	**Mayer** (2–0)	Bray (4–3)	**Carter** (2)		1,148	36-17	17–11
May 17	at Louisiana-Monroe		Warhawk Field • Monroe, LA	**W** 13-4	**Frith** (2–0)	Wine (6–8)	None		1,311	37-17	18–11
May 18	at Louisiana-Monroe		Warhawk Field • Monroe, LA	**W** 12-1 (7 inn)	**Wilson** (4-4)	Aulds (4–8)	None		1,449	38-17	19–11

Postseason (5–4)

SBC Tournament (3–1)
Date	Opponent	(Seed) / Rank	Site/stadium	Score	Win	Loss	Save	TV	Attendance	Overall record	SBC record
May 22	vs. (6) FIU	(3)	M. L. Tigue Moore Field • Lafayette, LA	**W** 9-6	**Wilson** (5–4)	Davis (6–3)	None		2,172	39-17	
May 24	(2) No. 24 South Alabama	(3)	M. L. Tigue Moore Field • Lafayette, LA	**W** 9-2	**Robichaux** (8–2)	Bell (6–1)	None		1,444	40-17	
May 25	(2) No. 24 South Alabama	(3)	M. L. Tigue Moore Field • Lafayette, LA	**W** 12-2 (7 inn)	**Wilson** (6–4)	Noble (5–3)	None		1,612	41-17	
May 26	(4) Florida Atlantic	(3)	M. L. Tigue Moore Field • Lafayette, LA	**L** 8-16	Gomber (7–4)	**Smith** (1–3)	None	CST	2,528	41-18	

NCAA Division I Baseball Championship (2-2)
Date	Opponent	Seed/Rank	Site/stadium	Score	Win	Loss	Save	TV	Attendance	Overall record	SBC record
Baton Rouge Regionals
May 31	vs. Sam Houston State		Alex Box Stadium, Skip Bertman Field • Baton Rouge, LA	**L** 2-4	Scott (2–0)	**Hicks** (3–2)	None		3,851	41-19	
Jun. 1	vs. Jackson State		Alex Box Stadium, Skip Bertman Field • Baton Rouge, LA	**W** 15-1	**Robichaux** (9–2)	Russell (3–1)	None		1,909	42-19	
Jun. 2	vs. Sam Houston State		Alex Box Stadium, Skip Bertman Field • Baton Rouge, LA	**W** 7-5	**Plitt** (4–1)	Godail (5–4)	**Hicks** (11)		2,066	43-19	
Jun. 2	vs. No. 1 LSU		Alex Box Stadium, Skip Bertman Field • Baton Rouge, LA	**L** 1-5	Bonvillain (3–0)	**Boutte** (8–4)	None		10,191	43-20	

Schedule source:

- Rankings are based on the team's current ranking in the Collegiate Baseball poll.

== Baton Rouge Regional ==
Baton Rouge Regional Teams
(1) LSU Tigers	(2) Louisiana–Lafayette Ragin' Cajuns	(3) Sam Houston State Bearkats	(4) Jackson State Tigers

First Round
1	LSU	11
4	Jackson State	7
3	Sam Houston State	4
2	Louisiana–Lafayette	2
Lower round 1
4	Jackson State	1
2	Louisiana–Lafayette	15

Semi-Finals
1	LSU	8
3	Sam Houston State	5
Lower final
2	Louisiana–Lafayette	7
3	Sam Houston State	5

Finals
1	LSU
2	Louisiana–Lafayette
