= Ó Conghaile =

Ó Conghaile is a surname.

Ó Conghaile meaning "descended from Conghaile" (Conghaile meaning "fierce as a hound") is not to be confused with Ó Coinghalaigh (Coingheallaigh meaning "faithful to pledges") which is a separate Irish Gaelic surname. Despite having their own pronunciations, histories and meaning, Ó Conghaile and Ó Coinghalaigh were both made into O'Connelly, Conneely, Quinnelly, and various other anglicized spellings. This primarily happened throughout the long subjugation and suppression of the Irish people and their native language under the English/British invaders.

Notable people with the name Ó Conghaile include:

- Micheál Ó Conghaile (fl. 1878–1892), Irish scribe
- Micheál Ó Conghaile (writer) (born 1962)
- Séamas Ó Conghaile (1868–1916), Scottish-born Irish republican, socialist, and trade union leader

== See also ==
- Connolly (disambiguation)
- Connelly (disambiguation)
