= William Warren Conolly =

The Hon. William Warren Conolly, OBE, JP (5 December 1920 – 22 October 2008) was a politician and attorney in the Cayman Islands.

He first entered the Cayman Government in 1944 as one of three elected members from the East End District. He traveled overseas from 1945 through 1948 in a personal capacity. In 1950 he was nominated to the Assembly by the Governor of Jamaica and the Cayman Islands and remained in Legislative Assembly of Vestrymen and Justices until the new constitution in 1959. In 1958 he founded the Cayman Vanguard Party, which dissolved soon after founding. He would go on to co-found the National Democratic Party with Mr. Ormond Panton, OBE. Mr. Conolly would marry Islay Leonie Conolly (née Bodden of Cayman Brac) in 1958 and have two children, William Burns Conolly and Jacqueline E. Conolly.

He was appointed to the Cayman Islands first Legislative Assembly as a nominated Member in 1959 by the Jamaican Governor Sir Kenneth Blackburne.

In 1962, Conolly later became a founding member and deputy president of the National Democratic Party. This party was instrumental throughout the 1960s in Cayman politics and fielded several winning politicians including Conolly.

In 1966 he was a part of the official delegation to travel to Jamaica to be presented to Her Majesty the Queen on her visit there.

In 1967 he shared in the founding of the Cayman Islands Law Society and served on its council for two terms. He was also a founding member of the Cayman Islands Chamber of Commerce.

William Warren Conolly eventually became one of the first Members of the Executive Council of the Cayman Islands with internal responsibility in 1972. He spearheaded the setting up the first Department of Tourism, The Mosquito Control and Natural Resources Department, the first Development Planning Law, the Land Adjudication process, and the setting up of the Lands & Survey Department. He was also instrumental in assisting the formation of other laws that created the Cayman financial Centre which we know today. He traveled extensively representing the Cayman Islands during his 8 years in the Executive Council, including the celebration of the Independence of the Bahamas

He founded the law firm Ritch & Conolly, Attorneys with Stepson David Ritch and remained a Partner until retirement in 1996. Conolly was a founding member and served on the board of the Caribbean Utilities Company for over 34 years, retiring director emeritus in 2000.

William Warren Conolly was awarded the OBE in 1975 for his significant contribution to the Cayman Islands development and is the recipient of many other local awards.

In January 2012, Mr. Conolly was made a National Hero of The Cayman Islands.
