= Amy Connolly =

American physicist

- Born: Cincinnati, Ohio, US
- Awards: National Science Foundation CAREER Award

Academic background
- Education: BS, physics, 1996, Purdue University; MS, Physics, 1998, PhD, Physics, 2003, University of California, Berkeley
- Thesis: A search for supersymmetric Higgs bosons in the di-tau decay mode in proton-antiproton collision at 1.8 TeV
- Doctoral advisor: Marjorie Shapiro

Amy Lynn Connolly is an American physicist. She is an associate professor in the Department of Physics at Ohio State University and a Fellow of the American Physical Society for "her contributions to experimental and theoretical studies of ultrahigh energy neutrinos, and to searches for these neutrinos using radio techniques."

== Early life and education ==
Connolly is originally from Cincinnati, Ohio where she attended Anderson High School. She completed her Bachelor of Science degree in physics from Purdue University and her Master's degree and PhD at the University of California, Berkeley. While completing her doctorate degree, she carried out a search for the Higgs boson decaying to tau leptons with data from the Collider Detector. From 1997 until 2003, Connolly worked as a research assistant at the Lawrence Berkeley National Laboratory.

== Career ==
Upon completing her postdoctoral fellowship at the University of California, Los Angeles, Connolly spent years at University College London (UCL) studying radio techniques to search for ultra-high energy neutrinos. During her time at UCL, she helped set up experiments in Antarctica to detect energetic particles. She left UCL in 2010 to become an assistant professor of physics at Ohio State University (OSU). In this role, she received a five-year National Science Foundation CAREER Award to support her search for high-energy neutrinos. Following this, Connolly was elected a Fellow of the American Physical Society for "her contributions to experimental and theoretical studies of ultrahigh energy neutrinos, and to searches for these neutrinos using radio techniques." She also received the 2019 Physics Undergraduate Teaching Award as voted for by students.

During her tenure at OSU, Connolly's research focused on simulations, data analysis, and instrumentation for experiments searching for neutrinos through vast volumes of natural media. The goal of her research was to utilize neutrinos at extreme energies to probe neutrino interactions and search for hints of new physics. In 2020, she earned the Susan M. Hartmann Mentoring and Leadership Award.
