= Bayless Conley =

American television personality

Bayless Conley is an American gospel pastor and television personality who hosts Answers With Bayless Conley on television.

Answers is a weekly program that can be found on CNBC in Europe, North Africa and the Middle East and on other local and regional channels in other places. Answers is broadcast in Mexico through Genesis Television.

Bayless's Answers program seeks to bring "practical teaching of the Bible to its viewers in a non-religious way." As a recovering drug addict and alcoholic, Conley has stated that he found God over 35 years ago through a 12-year-old Christian boy.

Bayless also founded Cottonwood Church. Bayless and the church notably had to fight local authorities to build a new church building in the early 2000s. The case went to Federal Court, which ruled that the city of Cypress was illegally exercising eminent domain. Cottonwood Church won the case and retained the land, but later resold it to the city due to a better offer for the larger plot of land nearby.

The church sold its 18 acres (73,000 m^{2}) to the city and moved onto 28 acres (110,000 m^{2}) that are part of a defunct golf course nearby. That property will cost more than the original 18-acre (73,000 m^{2}) site.

Bayless was hospitalized after a boating accident in late January 2014. He has since recovered and returned to ministry.
