= Connelly-Harrington House =

Historic house in Arkansas, United States

- U.S. National Register of Historic Places
- U.S. Historic district – Contributing property
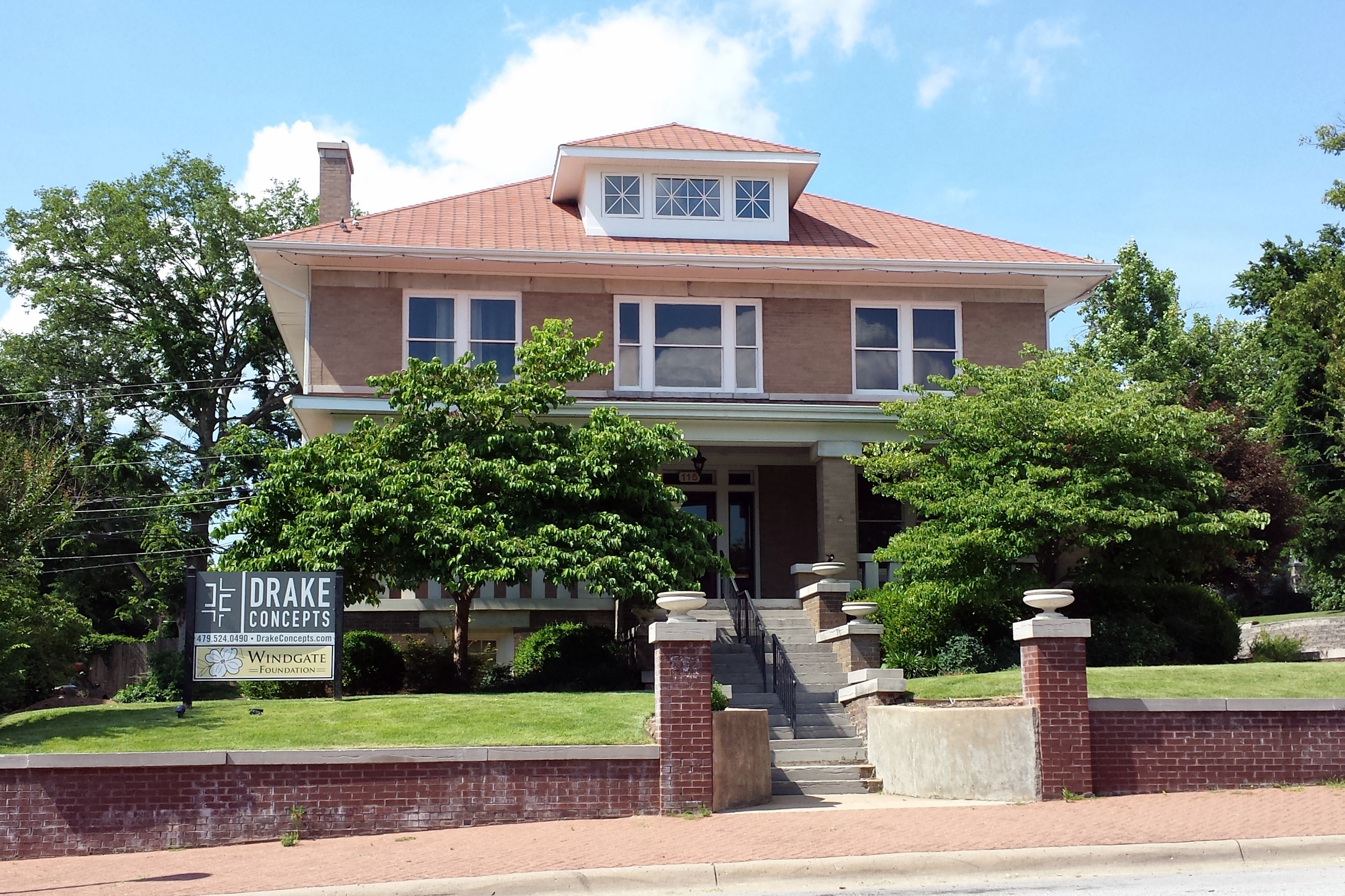

- Location within Arkansas Location within the United States
- Location: 115 E. University, Siloam Springs, Arkansas
- Coordinates: 36°11′14″N 94°32′26″W
- Area: less than one acre
- Built: 1913
- Architectural style: Prairie School, Bungalow/craftsman
- Part of: Siloam Springs Downtown Historic District (ID94001338)
- MPS: Benton County MRA
- NRHP reference No.: 87002386

Significant dates
- Added to NRHP: January 28, 1988
- Designated CP: May 26, 1995

The Connelly-Harrington House is a historic house at 115 East University Street in Siloam Springs, Arkansas.

== History ==
Connelly Harrington was an attorney from Missouri who moved to Siloam Springs and started the Benton County Hardware Company, a mercantile company with three locations. It was very profitable, and he then established the Farmers National Bank that provided capital for businesses to develop commercial properties in the town. One of the wealthiest people in that part of Arkansas, he also was a local philanthropist and promoter of the city.

In 1919, Harrington was one of the original board members of Southwestern Collegiate Institute (currently John Brown University).

In 1920, Connelly Harrington and his wife Minnie Kemper Harrington built this house for their home. In 1935, they both died; John Brown University bought the house used it as a hospital until 1948. At that time, the building was sold again and became The Ozark Hotel (apartments), after which it was rehabilitated and served as the Siloam Springs Chamber of Commerce office as well as office space for companies involved in downtown revitalization.

== Features ==
This is an architecturally eclectic brick structure, with elements of Prairie Style, Classical Revival, and Craftsman architecture.

In 1988, the house was listed on the National Register of Historic Places. By January 2012, the building was owned by Ron Drake, whose company had bought and renovated more than 45 homes in the town. Their offices and the offices of organizations involved in downtown revitalization were in the building.

A January 2012 fire destroyed the top floor and the rest of the building suffered extensive smoke and water damage. Drake spent $535,000 in restoring the building, alongside receiving a 20% federal income tax credit and a 25% state income tax credit that could be sold. He restored the building in less than ten months and was able to keep it on the National Register of Historical Places. For this work, he received an award from the Historic Preservation Alliance of Arkansas.

== See also ==
- National Register of Historic Places listings in Benton County, Arkansas
