= Emma Conley =

American educator

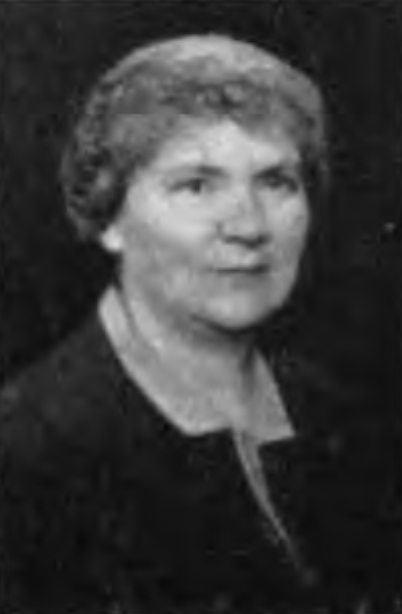
- Emma Conley, from the 1927 yearbook of Cornell University
- Born: Emmalline Conley; September 1869; Fond du Lac, Wisconsin, U.S.
- Died: October 6, 1928 (aged 59); Waupaca, Wisconsin, U.S.
- Other names: Emma Connelly
- Occupations: Home economist, educator, state official

Emma Conley (September 1869 – October 6, 1928) was an American consumer educator. She taught at the University of Wisconsin and at Cornell University, and wrote two home economics textbooks, Nutrition and Diet (1913) and Principles of Cooking (1914).

== Early life and education ==
Emmaline Conley was born in Fond du Lac, Wisconsin, the daughter of Dennis Conley and Johanna Conley. Both of her parents were Irish immigrants. She completed a bachelor's degree at West Virginia University in 1900, with a senior thesis titled "The Influence of Nineteenth Century Fiction on Social Reform".

== Career ==
Conley taught at the Marathon County Agricultural School in Wausau, and at the Stout Institute in Menomonie, early in her career. In 1910 she caused a "near riot" by telling an audience of 600 farmers in La Crosse that high school graduates are "not fitted for any position of worth."

Conley was director of domestic science at the Wisconsin State Normal School in Oshkosh. In 1913 she was appointed Wisconsin state inspector for domestic science. While based in the Midwest, she was vice-chair of the Home Economics section of the Central Association of Science and Mathematics Teachers. She was also chair of the Home Economics committee of the Wisconsin Education Association. During World War I, she traveled the state giving presentations on wartime food conservation. "Because there will always be some people who will not live up to the regulations," she said in 1918 at a bread-making demonstration, "some of the rest of us will have to do more than our share."

Conley wrote two high school textbooks. The first, Nutrition and Diet (1913), began: "The medicine of the future is prevention. The time is coming when it will be considered as gross ignorance or carelessness to be sick as it now is to be unable to read and write."

Conley moved to New York, where she was worked for the State Department of Education as a specialist in vocational education for girls. She was also an acting professor of rural education at Cornell University in the 1920s.

== Publications ==
- "A Course of Study in Domestic Science" (1905)
- "Cheese as a Food" (1906)
- "Why Girls Should Study Domestic Science" (1909)
- Nutrition and Diet: A Textbook for Secondary Schools (1913)
- Principles of Cooking: A Textbook in Domestic Science (1914)
- "School Credit for Home Work" (1915)

== Personal life ==
Conley died suddenly in 1928, at the age of 59, while vacationing with her brother in Waupaca, Wisconsin.
