= Johnny Óg Connolly =

Irish musician

Johnny Óg Connolly is an Irish musician.

A son of traditional musician Johnny Connolly of Inis Bearachain, Connemara, Connolly began playing the accordion aged nine, learning from his father and Micheal Mheáirt Ó Coisdealbha. Two years later he was the winner of the Slógadh and Fleadh Ceoil All-Ireland on the button accordion. Aged fourteen, he joined Na h-Ancairí, featuring singer John Beag Ó Flatharta, playing in the band for eight years. In 1994 he joined the Seán Keane Band, performing widely in Europe and North America.

In 1998, he toured with Lord of the Dance. In 2003 he settled in Connemara. Some of his compositions have been recorded by his father, as well as the duo Michael Rooney and June McCormack. His influences include Joe Burke and Andy McGann.

In January 2012 it was announced that his "debut solo album, Aisling Yoshua/Joshua's Dream has won the gold in the 2011 Ticket Awards for Best Trad Album".

== Discography ==
- The Bees' Wing, Cló Iar Chonnachta, 1990
- Dreaming Up The Tunes (with Brian McGrath), 1998
- Dusk Till Dawn (with Charlie Lennon), 2005
- Aisling Yoshua, April 2011
- Siar, November 2016
- Fear Inis Bearachain, December 2018
