= National Democratic Party (Cayman Islands) =

In 1962, Ormond Panton, OBE and his chief ally, William Warren Conolly, OBE of East End (both now National Heroes) founded and became the first two members of the National Democratic Party. It was the first successful political party in the Cayman Islands following on from the earlier attempted Cayman Vanguard Party formed by Conolly in 1958. Mr Ormond Panton became the first Caymanian to win an election as Party Leader.

The party won the majority of the seats (7-5) in the 1964 elections but did not control the government as the UK administrator at the time, Mr. Jack Rose CMG, MBE had the power to appoint members and appointed members that opposed them. The nominated members along with the minority thus formed the government. In 1968 only William Warren Conolly retained his seat as the rest of the party lost at the polls.

The National Democratic Party never regained its popularity of the early 1960s and dissolved shortly after its loss in the 1968 elections.

Political parties disappeared until late 2001 and 2002 when the two current parties, the United Democratic Party and the Peoples Progressive Movement, were formed.
