= Connelly, New York =

- Hamlet
- Location within New York Location within the United States
- Coordinates: 41°54′36″N 73°59′28″W
- Country: United States
- State: New York
- County: Ulster
- Elevation: 23 ft (7.0 m)
- Time zone: UTC-5 (Eastern (EST))
  - Summer (DST): UTC-4 (EDT)
- ZIP code: 12417
- Area code: 845
- GNIS feature ID: 947303

Connelly is a hamlet in Ulster County, New York, United States. The community is located on the east bank of Rondout Creek, opposite Kingston. Connelly has a post office with ZIP code 12417, which opened on December 6, 1889. In 1888 the hamlet of Connelly established Hasbrouck Engine Company One on Center Street. The company had one horse-drawn pumper out of their Center Street station. By the 1980s, Hasbrouck Engine Company One had moved to 121 First Avenue, with the name changed from Hasbrouck Engine Company One to Connelly Fire Department. The Hamlet of Connelly's shores upon the Rondout Creek was called home by many marine basins over the years.
