= Dan Connolly =

Dan Connolly may refer to:

- Dan Connolly (American football) (born 1982), American football player
- Dan Connolly (computer scientist), American computer scientist

== See also ==
- Daniel W. Connolly (1847–1894), politician
