= Seán Ó Catháin =

Seán Ó Catháin (fl. 1726) was an Irish scribe and tutor.

While little is known of Ó Catháin, he is described in The Irish Classical Self: Poets and Poor Scholars in the Eighteenth and Nineteenth Centuries, by Laurie O'Higgins, as having left an "impression of his life and personality" in the notes which accompany some of his transcriptions.

In 1726, he was employed to transcribe Trí Biorghaoithe an Bháis (by Seathrún Céitinn) and Beatha Chaitríona (on the life of Catherine of Alexandria) for Francis Óg son of Thomas Blake of Furbogh, County Galway. This work is now in the British Library where it is labelled "Egerton MS 184". In his notes, Ó Catháin described himself as the "tutor and humble dependent" of Blake. He included a Latin acrostic (a composition in which the first letter of each line spells out a message) which reads FRANCISCUS BLAKE DE FORBAGH VIVAT DIU, "Francis Blake of Forbagh, long may he live".

He also wrote a work (classified as manuscript reference "RIA 23 G 4") which contains history, genealogy and poetry, sometime between 1722 and 1729. According to the historian Nollaig Ó Muraíle, Ó Catháin "was aged about sixty" when he "signed his name in [a] manuscript" on 14 June 1724.
