= SS Joseph V. Connolly =

Liberty ship of WWII

- SS Joseph V. Connolly loading World War II casualties in Antwerp, September 1947

History

United States
- Name: Joseph V. Connolly
- Namesake: Joseph V. Connolly
- Owner: War Shipping Administration (WSA)
- Operator: South Atlantic Steamship Lines, Inc.
- Ordered: as type (EC2-S-C5) hull, MC hull 3143
- Builder: J.A. Jones Construction, Panama City, Florida
- Cost: $845,073
- Yard number: 103
- Way number: 4
- Laid down: 25 May 1945
- Launched: 9 July 1945
- Completed: 8 August 1945
- Identification: Call sign: AOEO
- Fate: Caught fire and abandoned, 12 January 1948; Sunk in tow, 29 January 1948

General characteristics
- Class & type: Liberty ship; type EC2-S-C5, boxed aircraft transport
- Tonnage: 10,600 LT DWT; 7,200 GRT
- Displacement: 3,380 long tons (3,434 t) (light); 14,245 long tons (14,474 t) (max)
- Length: 441 feet 6 inches (135 m) oa; 416 feet (127 m) pp; 427 feet (130 m) lwl
- Beam: 57 feet (17 m)
- Draft: 27 ft 9.25 in (8.4646 m)
- Installed power: 2 × Oil fired 450 °F (232 °C) boilers, operating at 220 psi (1,500 kPa); 2,500 hp (1,900 kW)
- Propulsion: 1 × triple-expansion steam engine, (manufactured by Filer and Stowell, Milwaukee, Wisconsin); 1 × screw propeller
- Speed: 11.5 knots (21.3 km/h; 13.2 mph)
- Capacity: 490,000 cubic feet (13,875 m^{3}) (bale)
- Complement: 38–62 USMM; 21–40 USNAG
- Armament: Varied by ship; Bow-mounted 3-inch (76 mm)/50-caliber gun; Stern-mounted 4-inch (102 mm)/50-caliber gun; 2–8 × single 20-millimeter (0.79 in) Oerlikon anti-aircraft (AA) cannons and/or, 2–8 × 37-millimeter (1.46 in) M1 AA guns

SS Joseph V. Connolly was a Liberty ship built in the United States during World War II. She was named after Joseph V. Connolly.

== Construction ==
Joseph V. Connolly was laid down on 25 May 1945, under a Maritime Commission (MARCOM) contract, MC hull 3143, by J.A. Jones Construction, Panama City, Florida; she was launched on 9 July 1945.

== History ==
She was allocated to South Atlantic Steamship Lines, Inc., on 8 August 1945.

In March 1947 Connolly was specially converted for the transportation of United States' war dead at the Hoboken Shipyard of the Bethlehem Steel Company. On 26 October 1947 she arrived at New York carrying the first 6,248 war dead from Europe.

On 12 January 1948, while transporting 6,445 empty metal coffins from New York to Antwerp, she caught fire and was abandoned 900 mi (1,400 km) east of New York. All 46 crewmen on board were rescued. She was taken in tow on 24 January, but broke loose and sank on 29 January.

Wreck location: 40°47′N 52°48′W

== Bibliography ==
- "Jones Construction, Panama City FL". www.ShipbuildingHistory.com. 13 October 2010.
- Maritime Administration. "Joseph V. Connolly". Ship History Database Vessel Status Card. U.S. Department of Transportation, Maritime Administration.
- Davies, James (May 2004). "Specifications (As-Built)" (PDF). p. 23.
- "SS Joseph V. Connolly".
- "SS Joseph V. Connolly". www.Wrecksite.eu. 12 June 2012.
