= 2013 Louisiana–Monroe Warhawks baseball team =

American college baseball season

2013 Louisiana–Monroe Warhawks baseball
- Conference: Sun Belt Conference
- Record: 18-36 (7-23 Sun Belt)
- Head coach: Jeff Schexnaider
- Home stadium: Warhawk Field

2013 Sun Belt Conference baseball standings
	Conf.				Overall
Team	W		L	PCT	W		L	PCT
No. 23 Troy ‍†‍‍^{y}	20	–	10	.667	42	–	20	.677
South Alabama ‍†‍‍^{y}	20	–	10	.667	43	–	20	.683
Louisiana–Lafayette ‍‍‍^{y}	19	–	11	.633	43	–	20	.683
No. 24 Florida Atlantic ‍‍‡‍^{y}	19	–	11	.633	42	–	22	.656
Western Kentucky ‍‍‍	16	–	14	.533	28	–	29	.491
Arkansas–Little Rock ‍‍‍	13	–	17	.433	28	–	28	.500
FIU ‍‍‍	13	–	17	.433	26	–	32	.448
Arkansas State ‍‍‍	12	–	18	.400	28	–	31	.475
Middle Tennessee ‍‍‍	11	–	19	.367	28	–	28	.500
Louisiana–Monroe ‍‍‍	7	–	23	.233	18	–	36	.333
† – Conference champion ‡ – Tournament champion y – Invited to the NCAA tournament As of June 4, 2013; Rankings from Collegiate Baseball

The 2013 ULM Warhawks baseball team represented University of Louisiana at Monroe in the NCAA Division I baseball season of 2013. The Tigers played their home games in Warhawk Field. The team was coached by Jeff Schexnaider, who is in his seventh season at ULM. In the 2012 season, the Warhawks reached the NCAA Regionals for the first time in more than 10 years; also, the Warhawks did win the post season Sun Belt championship.

== Pre-season ==
=== Key Losses ===
- Joey Rapp, IF/OF, .322 BA, 9 HRs, 51 RBI, 44 Runs (Grad. / Drafted)
- Jeremy Sy, IF, .330 BA, 15 2Bs, 53 Runs, 37 RBI (Graduation / Drafted)
- Randy Zeigler, P, 5-7, 3.69 ERA, 112.1 IP, 111 Ks, .234 Opp BA (Drafted)
- Wil Browning, P, 8-3, 6 Saves, 3.41 ERA, 60.2 IP, 56 Ks (Grad. / Signed)
- Fraser Adams, P, 2-1, 3.57 ERA, 40.1 IP, 34 Ks, .329 Opp BA (Graduation)
- Les Aulds, OF, .245, 24-34 SBs, 37 Runs, 28 RBI (Graduation)
- Caleb Clowers, IF, .300 BA, 10 2Bs, 38 Runs, 34 RBI (Graduation)
- Kendall Thamm, P, 7-3, 2 Saves, 3.28 ERA, 71.1 IP, 52 Ks (Graduation)

=== Key Players Returning ===
- Taylor Abdalla, Sr., OF, .215 BA, 16 XBH, 31 RBI, 25 Runs
- Brandon Alexander, Sr., OF, .280 BA, 12 XBH, 33 Runs, 32 RBI
- Shelby Aulds, Sr., RH, 3-3, 5.23 ERA, 62.0 IP, 45 Ks, .291 Opp BA
- Judd Edwards, Sr., IF, .293 BA, 13 2Bs, 45 Runs, 27 RBI
- Corben Green, R-Sr., IF, .261 BA, 13 2Bs, 33 Runs, 32 RBI
- Cale Wine, R-Sr., RH, 6-4, 4.03 ERA, 98.1 IP, 56 Ks, .266 Opp BA

== Personnel ==
=== Roster ===
2013 Louisiana–Monroe Warhawks baseball roster
Pitchers: 8 Christo Jones - Junior; 10 Logan Dopson - Junior; 13 Cale Wine - RsSenior; 16 Alex Hermeling - Sophomore; 20 Tyler Bray - Junior; 23 Cody Connalley - RsFreshman; 25 Alex Dumaine - Junior; 27 Josh Lenone - Freshman; 28 Ryan Bergeron - Sophomore; 29 Shelby Audls - Senior; 30 Andrew Richardson - RsSenior; 32 Carey Taylor - Junior; 33 Chet Simoneaux - RsJunior; 36 Devin Malone - Senior; 38 Jared Dye - Junior; 40 Chad Miller - Junior; 44 Trey Setzer - Junior	Catchers: 9 Logan Fiasco - Senior; 11 Dalton Todd - Freshman; 37 Blake Wolfe - RsFreshman	Infielders: 1 Trent Lucus - Senior; 2 Josh Faciane - RsFreshman; 5 Koddie Tidwell - Freshman; 7 Jeff Fuller - Junior; 12 Tanner Hebert - Freshman; 14 Judd Edwards - Senior; 21 Corben Green - RsSenior	Outfielders: 1 Raph Rhymes - Senior; 2 Chris Sciambra - Sophomore; 5 Andrew Stevenson - Freshman; 7 Sean McMullen - Junior; 9 Mark Laird - Freshman; 13 Alex Edward - Senior

2013 LSU Tigers Baseball Roster & Bios http://www.lsusports.net/SportSelect.dbml?&DB_OEM_ID=5200&SPID=2173&SPSID=27867

=== Coaching staff ===
2013 Louisiana–Monroe Warhawks baseball coaching staff
- Jeff Schexnaider - Head coach - 7 years at ULM
- Justin Hill - Pitching Coach - 2 year
- Cory Barton - Hitting Coach - 5 years
- Jim Rushworth - Volunteer assistant coach - 2 years
- Caleb Clowers - Student assistant
- Stephen Lukinovich - Student assistant
- Phil Keifenheim - Camp Coordinator - 9 years

2013 ULM Warhawks Baseball Coaches & Bios http://www.lsusports.net/SportSelect.dbml?&DB_OEM_ID=5200&SPID=2173&SPSID=28707

== Schedule/Results ==
2013 Louisiana–Monroe Warhawks baseball game log
Regular season

February
#	Date	Opponent	Site/stadium	Score	Win	Loss	Save	Attendance	Overall record	Sun Belt record
1	February 15	Wake Forest	Warhawk Field	9-0	Wine (1-0)	Fishcer 0-1		1,481	1-0	-
