= Connelly Sadakabatu =

Solomon Islands politician (born 1956)

The Right Honourable Connelly Sadakabatu MP

Minister for Development, Planning and Aid Co-ordination
- Incumbent
- Assumed office 22 October 2012
- Prime Minister: Gordon Darcy Lilo
- Preceded by: Snyder Rini

Minister for Agriculture and Livestock
- In office 21 November 2011 – 22 October 2012
- Prime Minister: Gordon Darcy Lilo
- Preceded by: himself (before 10 day vacancy)
- Succeeded by: David Tome

Minister for Agriculture and Livestock
- In office 30 August 2010 – 11 November 2011
- Prime Minister: Danny Philip
- Succeeded by: himself (after vacancy)

Member of Parliament for North West Choiseul
- Incumbent
- Assumed office 4 August 2010
- Preceded by: Clement Kengava

Personal details
- Born: 11 June 1956 (age 69)
- Party: Independent

Connelly Sadakabatu (born 11 June 1956) is a Solomon Islands politician.

He studied tropical agriculture at the Popondetta Agricultural College in Papua New Guinea, obtained a diploma in teaching agriculture at the University of Papua New Guinea in 1986, and then a master's degree in agriculture at the University of Western Sydney in 1996. He worked as a public servant, most notably becoming head of school at the Solomon Islands College of Higher Education.

He was first elected to the National Parliament of Solomon Islands as Independent MP for North West Choiseul in the August 2010 general election. Prime Minister Danny Philip appointed him Minister for Agriculture and Livestock Development in his coalition government. In November 2011, he crossed the floor to the Opposition with several other MPs, helping it to bring down the Philip government through a motion of no confidence. The new Prime Minister, Gordon Darcy Lilo, returned Sadakabatu to the position he had held under Philip. In October 2012, in a Cabinet reshuffle, he was shifted to the position of Minister for Development, Planning and Aid Co-ordination.
