= John Connelly (1910s footballer) =

English footballer

Personal information
- Place of birth: Cleckheaton, England
- Position: Inside left

Senior career*
Years	Team	Apps	(Gls)
1910–1911	Bradford City	1	(0)
- * Club domestic league appearances and goals

John Connelly was an English professional footballer who played as an inside left.

== Career ==
Born in Cleckheaton, Connelly played for Bradford City between December 1910 and 1911, making 1 appearance in the Football League for them.

== Sources ==
- Frost, Terry (1988). Bradford City A Complete Record 1903-1988. Breedon Books Sport. ISBN 0-907969-38-0.
