= Micheál Ó Conghaile =

Micheál Ó Conghaile (fl. 1878–1892) was an Irish scribe.

Ó Conghaile transcribed poetry, including Dán na Gaoithe Móire (Night of the Big Wind) and Dán an Cholera (poem of cholera). He also transmitted poetry by Antoine Ó Raifteirí and old folk poems. He died "on the roadside" (ar thaoibh an bhóthair) near the national school of Ballinderreen in the parish of Cummer, County Galway.

One scholar who examined his manuscripts, Tomás de Róiste, despaired of understanding Ó Conghaile's difficult script, saying that his "handwriting is something terrible to make out ... I had it 4 years and found it a Chinese puzzle!".

== See also ==
- Seán Ó Catháin
