= Islay Conolly =

Caymanian educator (1923–2022)

Islay Conolly MBE
- Born: Islay Leonie Bodden; 8 May 1923; Cayman Brac, Cayman Islands, Colony of Jamaica
- Died: 3 July 2022 (aged 99)
- Occupation: Educator
- Years active: 1947–1982

Islay Conolly, MBE (8 May 1923 – 3 July 2022) was a Caymanian teacher and school administrator. Serving as a teacher and principal at various schools on the islands, she became Chief Education Officer in 1970. She was honored by the Caymanian government with the Spirit of Excellence Award during National Heroes Day and was first recipient of the Chamber of Commerce's Lifetime Achievement Award in Education. Conolly was honored as a Member of the Order of the British Empire (MBE) in the 1982 New Year Honours.

== Early life ==
Islay Leonie Bodden was born on 8 May 1923, on Cayman Brac in the Cayman Islands Colony of Jamaica, which at the time was part of the British Empire, to Ella and Harris Bodden.

== Career ==
After completing her schooling, Bodden began her career in education as the headmistress of the Creek School in Cayman Brac in 1947. On 28 December 1950, in Kingston, Jamaica, she married Callan Hunter Ritch and they would subsequently have a son, David and separate. Ritch moved to Grand Cayman and worked as the principal of East End Primary School. On 12 April 1958, she married William Warren Conolly, and the couple would later have two children, a son Burns and a daughter Jackie.

In 1970 Conolly was appointed the Cayman's Chief Education Officer. Among innovations she brought to the school system were public education for the deaf and a junior college system. Prior to her tenure, the only available schooling for deaf students was private education and there was no universal standard or public education for deaf students. In 1981, Conolly was honored as a member of the Order of the British Empire and she retired in 1982. In 2008, she was honored by the Cayman Islands Chamber of Commerce as the inaugural recipient of their Lifetime Achievement Award in Education. The following year, she was honored by the Caymanian government during the National Heroes Day Celebrations with a Spirit of Excellence Award.

== Death and legacy ==
Conolly died on 3 July 2022. At the time of her death, she was eulogized by Premier Wayne Panton, who recognized her contributions to education including the introduction of community college and public education for hearing-impaired students in the Cayman Islands.
