= Conley E. Greear =

American politician (died 1966)

Member of the Virginia House of Delegates representing Scott County
- In office 1954–1958

Personal details
- Born: Conley Erwin Greear; March 2, 1887 Wood, Scott County, Virginia, U.S.
- Died: April 12, 1966 (aged 79) Kingsport, Tennessee, U.S.
- Resting place: Holston View Cemetery
- Party: Republican
- Spouse(s): Venus Phobe Carter; Ruth Addington
- Children: 2
- Education: Emory and Henry College; Medical College of Virginia (D.D.S.)
- Occupation: Politician; dentist

Conley Erwin Greear (March 2, 1887 – April 12, 1966) was an American politician and dentist from Virginia. He served as a member of the Virginia House of Delegates from 1954 to 1958.

== Biography ==
Conley Erwin Greear was born on March 2, 1887, in Wood, Scott County, Virginia. He graduated from Emory and Henry College and the Medical College of Virginia with a D.D.S.

Greear was a dentist for 56 years. He practiced dentistry in Fort Blackmore.

Greear was a Republican. He served as a member of the Virginia House of Delegates, representing Scott County, from 1954 to 1958.

Greear married Venus Phobe Carter. He also married Ruth Addington. He had a son and daughter, Marion Carter and Louise. He was a Baptist.

Greear died on April 12, 1966, at Holston Valley Community Hospital in Kingsport, Tennessee. He was buried in Holston View Cemetery.
