= Patricia Connolly =

Scottish biomedical engineer

Patricia Connolly FREng FRSE (born August 1958) is a Scottish biomedical engineer whose expertise concerns the development of bioelectronic devices for medical diagnostics and monitoring. Her recent work has largely focussed on detecting and preventing infection in wounds.

Connolly is a professor of biomedical engineering at the University of Strathclyde, the director of the Strathclyde Institute of Medical Devices, deputy associate principal of the university, joint lead for the university's HealthTech Cluster, founding CEO of Strathclyde spinout corporation Ohmedics Ltd, and a member of the board of directors of the Association of British HealthTech Industries.

== Education and career ==
Connolly is originally from Glasgow. After completing her PhD at the University of Strathclyde in 1984, she became a lecturer and then senior lecturer at the University of Glasgow from 1984 to 1992. She left academia for industry in 1992, working in Italy and Switzerland developing medical diagnostic devices. She returned to Glasgow in 1999 to take a newly created Chair in Bioengineering at the University of Strathclyde. Since 2001, Connolly has received nine patents relating to her research.

== Recognition ==
Connolly was elected to the Fellowship of the Royal Society of Edinburgh in 2005. In 2014 she was named a Fellow of the Royal Academy of Engineering.
