= Connelly Creek =

Stream in Alberta, Canada

Coordinates: 49.6°N 114.13525°W

Connelly Creek is a stream in Alberta, Canada.

Connelly Creek has the name of the Connelly brothers, pioneer citizens.

== See also ==
- List of rivers of Alberta
