= Marjorie Shapiro =

American experimental physicist

- Occupations: Experimental particle physicist; professor

Academic background
- Education: Harvard University (A.B.); University of California, Berkeley (Ph.D.)

Academic work
- Institutions: University of California, Berkeley
- Doctoral students: Amy Connolly
- Website: physics.lbl.gov/shapiro

Marjorie Dale Shapiro is an American experimental particle physicist, a collaborator on the ATLAS experiment, a faculty senior scientist at the Lawrence Berkeley National Laboratory, and a professor of physics at the University of California, Berkeley.

== Education and career ==
Shapiro graduated magna cum laude from Harvard University in 1976, with a bachelor's degree in physics. She completed her Ph.D. in physics at the University of California, Berkeley in 1984 with her dissertation titled: Inclusive Distributions and Two Particle Correlations in Annihilation at 29 GeV Center-of-Mass Energy.

After postdoctoral research at Harvard, she joined the Harvard University faculty as an assistant professor in 1987, and was Loeb Associate Professor there in 1989. She returned to Berkeley as a faculty member in 1990, and became affiliated with the Lawrence Berkeley National Laboratory as a faculty senior scientist in 1992. She was promoted to professor at Berkeley in 1994, and has served as department chair from 2004 to 2007.

== Recognition ==
In 1992, Shapiro was named a Fellow of the American Physical Society (APS), after a nomination from the APS Division of Particles and Fields, "for contributions to the study of high-transverse-momentum phenomena in proton-antiproton collisions". She was elected in 2020 to the American Academy of Arts and Sciences.
