= Bill Connelly (soccer) =

American soccer player

Personal information
- Full name: William Connelly
- Position: Defender

Senior career*
Years	Team	Apps	(Gls)
1953–1954	Brookhattan		

International career
1953	United States	1	(0)
- * Club domestic league appearances and goals

William Connelly earned one cap with the United States national team in a 6–3 loss to England on June 8, 1953. At the time, he played with Brookhattan of the American Soccer League.
