= Connelly (surname) =

Connelly is an anglicised form of the Gaelic-Irish surname Ó Conghalaigh. Notable people with the surname Connelly include:

== Acting ==
- Christopher Connelly (actor), American actor
- Edward Connelly, American silent film actor
- Jake Connelly, American actor
- Jennifer Connelly, American actress

== Business ==
- Matthew J. Connelly (1907–1976), American businessman and civil servant
- Ross J. Connelly, American business executive
- Thomas M. Connelly, American business executive

== Law ==
- Jeter C. Pritchard, American lawyer, politician, and judge
- Lloyd Connelly, American Superior Court judge
- Sean Connelly (lawyer), American lawyer and former judge

== Music ==
- Al Connelly, Canadian guitarist and songwriter
- Chris Connelly (musician), Scottish singer/songwriter
- Joe Connelly (musician), American singer and musician
- Peggy Connelly, American singer and actress
- Peter Connelly, British video game composer and sound designer
- Reg Connelly, British songwriter and music publisher

== Politics ==
- Henry Connelly, American doctor and politician; Governor of New Mexico (1861–1866)
- Henry C. Connelly (1832–1912), American merchant and politician in New York State
- Mark Matthew Connelly (1879–1955), Irish-born merchant and politician in Canada
- Maryanne Connelly, American politician in New Jersey
- Michael Connelly, American Republican politician
- Michael Connelly (New Zealand politician), New Zealand Labour Party activist, father of:
- Mick Connelly (Michael Aynsley Connelly), New Zealand Labour Party politician and cabinet minister
- Ted Connelly (1918–2013), Australian politician

== Sports ==
=== Baseball ===
- Bill Connelly (baseball) (1925–1980), American baseball player
- Steve Connelly (born 1974), American baseball player
- Tom Connelly (1897–1941), American baseball player

=== Football (soccer) ===
- Bill Connelly (soccer), American soccer player
- Bob Connelly, Scottish footballer
- Fred Connelly, English footballer
- George Connelly, Scottish footballer
- Sean Connelly, English footballer

=== Gridiron football ===
- Mike Connelly (1935–2021), American gridiron football player
- Ryan Connelly (born 1995), American gridiron football player
- Vaughan Connelly (1902–unknown), American gridiron football player

=== Ice hockey ===
- Bert Connelly, Canadian ice hockey player
- James Connelly (ice hockey), Canadian ice hockey player
- Wayne Connelly, Canadian ice hockey player

=== Other ===
- Ana Paula Connelly, Brazilian beach volleyball player
- Brent Connelly, Australian Rules footballer
- Tina Connelly, Canadian track and field athlete

== Writing ==
- Charlie Connelly, British author
- Chris Connelly (journalist), American sports and entertainment writer
- Joe Connelly (writer), American writer
- Karen Connelly, Canadian writer
- Marc Connelly, American playwright
- Mark Connelly (historian), British historian
- Michael Connelly, American detective writer

== Other ==
- Chuck Connelly (1955–2025), American painter
- Cornelia Connelly (1809–1979), American-born religious educator in England
- Dale Connelly (born 1955), American radio host
- James Alexander Connelly Jr. (1894–1944), American military pilot
- James Pearse Connelly, American film production designer
- Joan Breton Connelly, American classical archaeologist
- John Connelly (disambiguation), several people
- Kevin Connelly, British comedian and impressionist
- Matthew Connelly (born 1967), American educator
- Robert Connelly (born 1942), American mathematician
- William A. Connelly (1931–2019), United States Army soldier; sixth Sergeant Major of the Army

== See also ==
- Connelly (disambiguation)
- Connolly (surname)
