= Connelly =

Connelly (from Ó Conghalaigh) may refer to:

== Communities ==
=== United States ===
- Connelly, New York, a hamlet in Ulster County, New York, U.S.
- Connelly Springs, North Carolina, a town in Burke County, North Carolina, U.S.
- Connelly Township, Minnesota, a township in Wilkin County, Minnesota, U.S.

=== Elsewhere ===
- Connolly's Lake, a former name of Bear Lake (Fort Connelly), an unincorporated settlement in British Columbia, Canada
- Connellys Marsh, a rural locality in Tasmania

== Geographic features ==
- Connelly Creek, a stream in Alberta, Canada
- Connelly Range, a mountain range in British Columbia, Canada
- Connolly's Lake, a former name of Bear Lake (Bear River), a lake in British Columbia, Canada

== People ==
=== Given name ===
- Connelly Early (born 2002), American baseball player
- Connelly Lemuelu (born 1998), Samoa international rugby league footballer
- Connelly Sadakabatu (born 1956), Solomon Islands politician

=== Surname ===
- Connelly (surname), includes a list of notable people with the surname

== Schools ==
- Connelly School of the Holy Child, Potomac, Maryland, U.S.
- Cornelia Connelly High School, Anaheim, California, U.S.

== Other ==
- 4816 Connelly, a main-belt asteroid
- Connelly Foundation, a philanthropic organization based in Philadelphia, Pennsylvania, U.S.
- Connelly sphere, a flexible polyhedron in geometry
- Connelly-Harrington House, a historic house in Siloam Springs, Arkansas, U.S.
- Connelly-Yerwood House, a historic house in Austin, Texas, U.S.
- Smith-Connelly Act, an American anti-strike act (1943)

== See also ==
- Conley (disambiguation)
- Connolly (disambiguation)
