= Inishbarra =

Island in County Galway, Ireland

Coordinates: 53°16′40″N 9°42′43″W

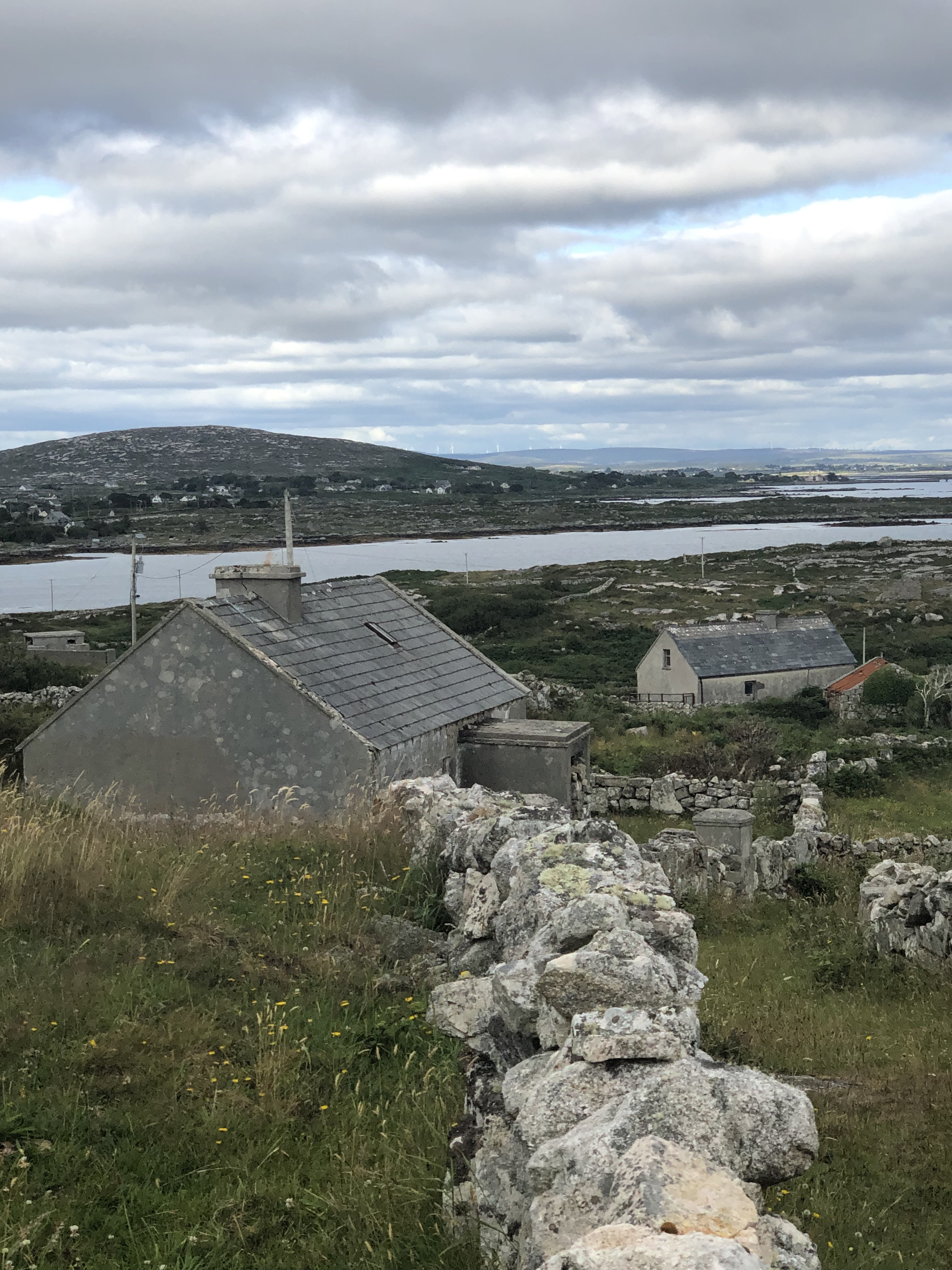
Inishbarra Lettermore Galway Ireland

Inishbarra (Irish: Inis Bearachain) is an island in County Galway situated east of the mouth of Kilkieran bay. An artificial causeway links the island to the mainland but this is only usable at very low tide.

== Demographics ==
Historical population

Year	Pop.	±%
1841	205	—
1851	91	−55.6%
1861	127	+39.6%
1871	148	+16.5%
1881	159	+7.4%
1891	152	−4.4%
1901	134	−11.8%
1911	147	+9.7%
1926	88	−40.1%

Year	Pop.	±%
1936	85	−3.4%
1946	100	+17.6%
1951	75	−25.0%
1956	64	−14.7%
1961	50	−21.9%
1966	27	−46.0%
1971	21	−22.2%
1979	5	−76.2%
1981	5	+0.0%

Year	Pop.	±%
1986	1	−80.0%
1991	1	+0.0%
1996	1	+0.0%
2002	0	−100.0%
2006	1	—
2011	1	+0.0%
2016	0	−100.0%
2022	0	0.00%

Source: Central Statistics Office. "CNA17: Population by Off Shore Island, Sex and Year". CSO.ie.
