= Ballyconneely =

Village in County Galway, Ireland

Ballyconneely Baile Conaola
- Village
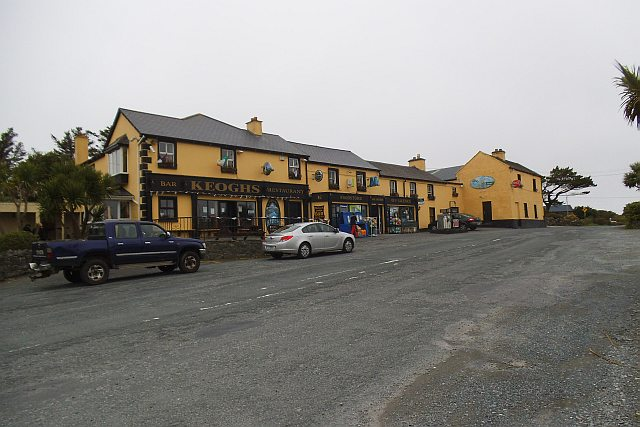
- Keoghs, Ballyconneely

- Location in Ireland
- Coordinates: 53°26′00″N 10°04′00″W
- Country: Ireland
- Province: Connacht
- County: County Galway /
- Time zone: UTC+0 (WET)
  - Summer (DST): UTC-1 (IST (WEST))
- Irish Grid Reference: L626445

Ballyconneely (Irish: Baile Conaola, meaning 'Conneelys' village'. Archaic name Baile 'ic Conghaile') is a village and small ribbon development in west Connemara, County Galway Ireland.

== Name ==
19th century antiquarian John O'Donovan documents a number of variants of the village, including Ballyconneely, Baile 'ic Conghaile, Ballykineely, Ballycunneely, and Balyconneely. An Post Placenames Branch archival notes Baile Uí Chonghaile, Baile 'ic Confhaola and other various spellings.

The surname, Conneely, was originally Mac Conghaile (Ó Conghaile contemporaneously), whereas Ó Conghaola (modern spelling Ó Conaola - Conneally) is an entirely unrelated sept, located in southern County Galway belonging to the Uí bhFhiachrach Aidne. Archival records from the early 20th century attests the origin of the village's name to that of Muintear Chlann Chonghaile or Clann Mhic Conghaile.

== Location ==
Settlements are spread out north on the road to Clifden and south on the road to Roundstone. This peninsula, jutting into the Atlantic Ocean between Clifden to the north and Roundstone to the south, is a mainly rural area. Its name is based on the old civil parish of Ballindoon, which in turn was named from the old fort or cashel on Doon Hill.

The area is home to several beaches: the Coral Strand at Derrygimla; west and north to Knock, Mannin, Dunloughan and Truska; and east and south from Keeraunmore, Aillebrack, and Ballyconneely Bay to Calla, Dolan and Murvey. Some of these beaches are also used for shore fishing.

== History ==
In 1854, the first salmon farming operation in the United Kingdom was carried out on the Dohulla Fishery.

In 1919, the first transatlantic flight by Alcock and Brown ended two miles away in Derrygimla Bog, an unsuitable landing place which damaged the aircraft.

The crash landing was near the Marconi Wireless Telegraph Station built in 1905, which was used to send the first transatlantic wireless message, to Cape Breton in Nova Scotia, in 1907.

A team of Dutch botanists studied lakes and water chemistry around Ballyconneelly in 1975 and throughout Ireland until 2010, due to the island's unique post-Ice Age landscape no longer found in the Netherlands.

== Tourism and amenities ==
Every July, the Ballyconneely pony show attracts people from the surrounding county to exhibit livestock and visit the travelling funfair. Ballyconneely breeds Connemara ponies, including some home and overseas champions. Legend has it that the breed originated when Arabian horses come ashore from a Spanish shipwreck near Slyne Head and bred with the small native pony.

Attractions include a 27-hole golf links, and Roundstone Bog three miles to the east, an expanse of moor, lake and stream, containing wildlife and rare plants. The beaches have edible shellfish and molluscs accessible at low tide, including clams, cockles, mussels, razorfish, sea urchins, shrimp and scallops, and with local knowledge, the occasional lobster. Connemara Smokehouse and Visitor Centre is located at Bunowen Pier, a small harbour used by local fishermen and boat owners.

Two shops, a post office, a community hall, and a local parish hall make up the village centre. Other businesses in the area include a hotel, a golf course with club house, guest-houses, bed-and-breakfast establishments, and holiday homes.

Former Taoiseach Brian Cowen has a holiday home in Dunloughan, close to the Connemara Golf Links.

== See also ==
- List of towns and villages in Ireland
