= Caribbean Utilities =

Caribbean Utilities Company, Ltd.
- Company type: Public
- Traded as: TSX: CUP.U
- Industry: Electric Utilities
- Headquarters: Grand Cayman
- Number of employees: 190
- Website: www.cuc-cayman.com

Caribbean Utilities Company, Ltd., known locally as "CUC", commenced operations as the only public electric utility in Grand Cayman, the largest of the three Cayman Islands, on May 10, 1966.

The company has more than 270 employees, most of whom are Caymanian, producing electricity from diesel fueled generators. The Company is committed to implementing and sourcing cleaner and renewable energy resources that will provide environmental, cost affordable energy solutions for the customers of Grand Cayman.

CUC is primarily owned by Fortis Inc., a holding company based in St. John's, Newfoundland and Labrador, Canada. CUC's shares are traded on the Toronto Stock Exchange.
