= Connolly =

Connolly may refer to:

== People ==
- Connolly (surname)

== Places ==
- Connolly, Western Australia, a suburb in Perth, Western Australia
- Connolly, County Clare, Ireland
- Connolly Park in Collooney, County Sligo, Ireland
- Dublin Connolly railway station in Dublin, Ireland

== See also ==
- Connelly (disambiguation)
- Cannoli
