= Elbert Caraway =

American athlete and coach (1905–1975)

- Caraway pictured in Epitome 1946, Lehigh yearbook

Biographical details
- Born: January 1, 1905; Sherman, Texas, U.S.
- Died: September 8, 1975 (aged 70); Carthage, New York, U.S.

Playing career

Football
- 1927–1929: Purdue

Baseball
- 1928–1930: Purdue
- 1930: Shawnee Robins
- 1931: Beaumont Exporters
- Positions: End (football); Outfielder, second baseman (baseball)

Coaching career (HC unless noted)

Football
- 1933–1934: Lehigh (ends)
- 1936–1940: Massachusetts State

Baseball
- 1937–1940: Massachusetts State
- 1942–1952: Lehigh

Administrative career (AD unless noted)
- 1943–1946: Lehigh

Head coaching record
- Overall: 9–32–3 (football); 122–130–2 (baseball)

Elbert Francis "Ebb" Caraway (January 1, 1905 – September 8, 1975) was an American football and baseball player and coach. He served as the head football coach at Massachusetts State College—now known as the University of Massachusetts Amherst—from 1936 to 1940, tallying a mark of 9–32–3. Caraway was also the head baseball coach at Massachusetts State from 1937 to 1941 and at Lehigh University from 1942 to 1952, compiling a career college baseball head coaching record of 122–130–2. Caraway attended Purdue University and played end for the Purdue Boilermakers from 1927 to 1929. He also played baseball at Purdue and was captain of the 1930 squad. Caraway first went to Lehigh in 1933 as the ends coach on the football team under A. Austin Tate and continued the following season under fellow Purdue alumnus Glen Harmeson. He was the school's acting athletic director during World War II.

Caraway died of a heart attack on September 8, 1975, at his home in Carthage, New York.

== Head coaching record ==
=== Football ===
Year	Team	Overall	Conference	Standing	Bowl/playoffs
Massachusetts State Aggies (Independent) (1936–1940)
1936	Massachusetts State	2–6			
1937	Massachusetts State	1–7–1			
1938	Massachusetts State	3–6			
1939	Massachusetts State	2–5–2			
1940	Massachusetts State	1–8			
Massachusetts State:		9–32–3			
Total:		9–32–3			

=== Baseball ===
Record table
Season	Team	Overall	Conference	Standing	Postseason
Massachusetts State Aggies (Independent) (1936–1940)
1936	Massachusetts State	2–10–1			
1937	Massachusetts State	11–3			
1938	Massachusetts State	10–3			
1939	Massachusetts State	14–5–1			
1940	Massachusetts State	3–8			
Massachusetts State:		40–29–2			
Lehigh Engineers (Independent) (1942–1952)
Lehigh:		82–101			
Total:		122–130–2			
