= Clemson Tigers baseball, 2010–2019 =

American college baseball seasons

Clemson Tigers baseball represents Clemson University in college baseball at the NCAA Division I level.

== 2011 ==
2011 Clemson Tigers baseball

Clemson Regional, 2–2
- Conference: Atlantic Coast Conference
- Record: 43–20 (17–13 ACC)
- Head coach: Jack Leggett (18th season)
- Assistant coaches: Dan Pepicilli (2nd season); Bradley Lecroy (4th season); Michael Johnson (3rd season)
- Home stadium: Doug Kingsmore Stadium

2011 Atlantic Coast Conference baseball standings
	Conf.				Overall
Team	W		L	PCT	W		L	PCT
Atlantic
No. 9 Florida State ^{x}‍‍‍^{y}	19	–	11	.633	46	–	19	.708
No. 21 Clemson ‍‍‍^{y}	17	–	13	.567	43	–	20	.683
NC State ‍‍‍^{y}	15	–	15	.500	35	–	27	.565
Wake Forest ‍‍‍	15	–	15	.500	25	–	31	.446
Boston College ‍‍‍	7	–	22	.241	17	–	33	.340
Maryland ‍‍‍	5	–	25	.167	31	–	25	.554
Coastal
No. 3 Virginia ^{x}‍‍‡‍^{y}	22	–	8	.733	56	–	12	.824
No. 19 Georgia Tech ^{x}‍‍‍^{y}	22	–	8	.733	42	–	21	.667
No. 5 North Carolina ‍‍‍^{y}	20	–	10	.667	51	–	16	.761
No. 22 Miami ‍‍‍^{y}	19	–	10	.655	38	–	23	.623
Virginia Tech ‍‍‍	11	–	19	.367	30	–	25	.545
Duke ‍‍‍	7	–	23	.233	26	–	30	.464
x – Division champion ‡ – Tournament champion y – Invited to the NCAA tournament As of June 24, 2011; Rankings from Collegiate Baseball

=== Coaches ===
Name	Title	First season at CU	Alma mater
Jack Leggett	Head coach	1994	Maine (1976)
Tom Riginos	Associate head coach	2003	Stetson (1990)
Dan Pepicelli	Assistant head coach	2010	SUNY Cortland (1990)
Michael Johnson	Volunteer Assistant Coach	2009	Clemson (2008)

=== Schedule ===
2011 Clemson Tigers baseball game log
Regular season
February

Date	Opponent	Site/stadium	Score	Win	Loss	Save	Attendance	Overall record	ACC record
February 18	Eastern Michigan	Doug Kingsmore Stadium • Clemson, SC	W 14–3	Weismann (1–0)	Lewis (0–1)	None	6,138	1–0	
February 19	Eastern Michigan	Doug Kingsmore Stadium • Clemson, SC	L 6–7	Chaffins (1–0)	Pohle (0–1)	None	5,407	1–1	
February 20	Eastern Michigan	Doug Kingsmore Stadium • Clemson, SC	W 5–1	Brady (1–0)	Weber (0–1)	Haselden (1)	3,985	2–1	
February 25	Cincinnati	Doug Kingsmore Stadium • Clemson, SC	W 15–4	Weisman (2–0)	Mergen (0–1)	None	4,804	3–1	
February 26	Charleston Southern	Doug Kingsmore Stadium • Clemson, SC	W 19–1	Haselden (1–0)	Markham (1–1)	None	5,089	4–1	
February 27	Michigan State	Fluor Field at the West End • Greenville, SC	W 8–0	Brady (2–0)	Waszak (1–1)	None	4,287	5–1	

March

Date	Opponent	Site/stadium	Score	Win	Loss	Save	Attendance	Overall record	ACC record
March 2	Wofford	Doug Kingsmore Stadium • Clemson, SC	W 5–1	Pohle (1–1)	White (0–1)	None	3,833	6–1	
March 4	at South Carolina	Carolina Stadium • Columbia, SC	L 3–6	Roth (3–0)	Weismann (2–1)	Price (3)	8,242	6–2	
March 6	South Carolina	Doug Kingsmore Stadium • Clemson, SC	W 10–5	Moorefield (1–0)	Price (0–1)	None	6,320	7–2	
March 8	vs South Carolina	Fluor Field at the West End • Greenville, SC	L 4–5	Koumas (1–0)	Frederick (0–1)	Price (4)	7,125	7–3	
March 11	Virginia	Doug Kingsmore Stadium • Clemson, SC	L 0–5	Hultzen (4)	Weismann (2–2)	None	4,051	7–4	0–1
March 12	Virginia	Doug Kingsmore Stadium • Clemson, SC	L 7–8	Mayberry (3–0)	Frederick (0–2)	Kline (6)	5,374	7–5	0–2
March 13	Virginia	Doug Kingsmore Stadium • Clemson, SC	L 6–7	Hunt (1–0)	Haselden (1–1)	Kline (7)	4,009	7–6	0–3
March 16	Presbyterian	Fluor Field at the West End • Greenville, SC	L 3–4	Knox (2–1)	Sarratt (0–1)	None	1,851	7–7	
March 18	Duke	Doug Kingsmore Stadium • Clemson, SC	W 9–6	Meyer (1–0)	Van Orden (2–3)	Frederick (1)	4,166	8–7	1–3
March 19	Duke	Doug Kingsmore Stadium • Clemson, SC	W 16–7	Pohle (2–1)	Pfisterer (1–1)	None	4,315	9–7	2–3
March 20	Duke	Doug Kingsmore Stadium • Clemson, SC	W 9–3	Firth (1–0)	Stroman (1–1)	None	3,794	10–7	3–3
March 22	Elon	Doug Kingsmore Stadium • Clemson, SC	W 7–2	Sarratt (1–1)	Girdwood (2–2)	None	3,478	11–7	
March 23	Elon	Doug Kingsmore Stadium • Clemson, SC	W 9–2	Lamb (1–0)	Fisher (0–1)	None	3,302	12–7	
March 25	at NC State	Doak Field • Raleigh, NC	L 0–6	Mazzoni (2–2)	Weismann (2–3)	None	1,176	12–8	3–4
March 26	at NC State	Doak Field • Raleigh, NC	L 3–5	Chamra (4–0)	Leone (0–1)	Overman (1)	967	12–9	3–5
March 27	at NC State	Doak Field • Raleigh, NC	W 7–3	Firth (2–0)	Healey (1–3)	Frederick (2)	810	13–9	4–5
March 29	Georgia	Doug Kingsmore Stadium • Clemson, SC	W 11–5	Pohle (3–1)	Boling (0–2)	None	3,942	14–9	

April

Date	Opponent	Site/stadium	Score	Win	Loss	Save	Attendance	Overall record	ACC record
April 1	at North Carolina	Boshamer Stadium • Chapel Hill, NC	L 3–13	P. Johnson (6–0)	Weismann (2–4)	None	1,386	14–10	4–6
April 2	at North Carolina	Boshamer Stadium • Chapel Hill, NC	L 5–9	Morin (2–1)	Moorefield (1–1)	None	3,014	14–11	4–7
April 3	at North Carolina	Boshamer Stadium • Chapel Hill, NC	L 4–5	Penny (1–0)	Lamb (1–1)	None	2,912	14–12	4–8
April 5	Coastal Carolina	Doug Kingsmore Stadium • Clemson, SC	W 5–4^{10}	Haselden (2–1)	Coons (1–3)	None	3,450	15–12	
April 6	Western Carolina	Doug Kingsmore Stadium • Clemson, SC	W 12–3	Weismann (3–4)	Curtis (1–2)	None	3,482	16–12	
April 8	Maryland	Doug Kingsmore Stadium • Clemson, SC	W 12–3	Meyer (2–0)	Carroll (5–2)	None	4,119	17–12	5–8
April 9	Maryland	Doug Kingsmore Stadium • Clemson, SC	W 7–0	Firth (3–0)	Potter (2–4)	Haselden (2)	5,074	18–12	6–8
April 10	Maryland	Doug Kingsmore Stadium • Clemson, SC	L 6–7	Wacker (2–1)	Frederick (0–3)	None	4,537	18–13	6–9
April 12	Presbyterian	Doug Kingsmore Stadium • Clemson, SC	W 7–2	Sarratt (2–1)	Richardson (4–3)	None	3,323	19–13	
April 15	at Boston College	Eddie Pellagrini Diamond at John Shea Field • Chestnut Hill, MA	W 9–2	Leone (1–1)	Bayuk (3–4)	None	477	20–13	7–9
April 16	at Boston College	Eddie Pellagrini Diamond at John Shea Field • Chestnut Hill, MA	W 7–5	Haselden (3–1)	Leonard (4–4)	Frederick (3)		21–13	8–9
April 16	at Boston College	Eddie Pellagrini Diamond at John Shea Field • Chestnut Hill, MA	W 9–2	Meyer (3–0)	Alvarez (0–1)	None	1,342	22–13	9–9
April 20	at Georgia	Foley Field • Athens, GA	W 5–2	Sarratt (3–1)	Cornwell (1–3)	Weismann (1)	2,297	23–13	
April 22	Wake Forest	Doug Kingsmore Stadium • Clemson, SC	W 2–0	Leone (2–1)	Holmes (2–3)	Weismann (2)	4,685	24–13	10–9
April 23	Wake Forest	Doug Kingsmore Stadium • Clemson, SC	L 3–9	Cooney (5–2)	Firth (3–1)	None	5,280	24–14	10–10
April 24	Wake Forest	Doug Kingsmore Stadium • Clemson, SC	W 10–4	Meyer (4–0)	Stadler (1–7)	None	4,112	25–14	11–10
April 26	Furman	Doug Kingsmore Stadium • Clemson, SC	W 5–0	Sarratt (4–1)	Gottlieb (0–2)	None	3,298	26–14	
April 27	at Western Carolina	Hennon Stadium • Cullowhee, NC	W 6–4^{8}	Haselden (4–1)	McKinney (0–1)	Meyer (1)	529	27–14	
April 29	Georgia Tech	Doug Kingsmore Stadium • Clemson, SC	W 4–2	Leone (3–1)	Pope (9–2)	Weismann (3)	4,706	28–14	12–10
April 30	Georgia Tech	Doug Kingsmore Stadium • Clemson, SC	L 1–5	Bradley (5–2)	Meyer (4–1)	None	5,377	28–15	12–11

May

Date	Opponent	Site/stadium	Score	Win	Loss	Save	Attendance	Overall record	ACC record
May 1	Georgia Tech	Doug Kingsmore Stadium • Clemson, SC	W 3–1	Sarratt (5–1)	Farmer (7–2)	Weismann (4)	4,419	29–15	13–11
May 7	Gardner–Webb	Doug Kingsmore Stadium • Clemson, SC	W 13–1	Leone (4–1)	Papelow (3–2)	None		30–15	
May 7	Gardner–Webb	Doug Kingsmore Stadium • Clemson, SC	W 12–0	Meyer (5–1)	Heiligenstadt (3–4)	None	5,151	31–15	
May 8	at Gardner–Webb	John Henry Moss Stadium • Boiling Springs, NC	W 5–1	Sarratt (6–1)	Pagan (3–2)	None	1,328	32–15	
May 10	at Furman	Fluor Field at the West End • Greenville, SC	W 5–1	Firth (4–1)	Friedman (1–3)	Campbell (1)	3,526	33–15	
May 11	East Tennessee State	Doug Kingsmore Stadium • Clemson, SC	W 8–3	Pohle (4–1)	Freeman (3–3)	None	1,421	34–15	
May 14	at Virginia Tech	English Field • Blacksburg, VA	W 7–2	Leone (5–1)	Mantiply (5–7)	None		35–15	14–11
May 14	at Virginia Tech	English Field • Blacksburg, VA	W 8–3	Moorefield (2–1)	Zecchino (5–5)	Campbell (2)	713	36–15	15–11
May 15	at Virginia Tech	English Field • Blacksburg, VA	L 2–3	Parsons (7–2)	Meyer (5–2)	Martir (2)	943	36–16	15–12
May 17	Davidson	Doug Kingsmore Stadium • Clemson, SC	W 19–0	Pohle (5–1)	Russell (2–4)	None	3,396	37–16	
May 19	at Florida State	Mike Martin Field at Dick Howser Stadium • Tallahassee, FL	L 6–8	Gilmartin (10–1)	Leone (5–2)	Bennett (12)	4,692	37–17	15–13
May 20	at Florida State	Mike Martin Field at Dick Howser Stadium • Tallahassee, FL	W 7–4	Sarratt (7–1)	Benincasa (2–1)	Weismann (5)	4,973	38–17	16–13
May 21	at Florida State	Mike Martin Field at Dick Howser Stadium • Tallahassee, FL	W 8–5	Haselden (5–1)	McGee (2–3)	Weismann (6)	4,761	39–17	17–13

Postseason
ACC Tournament

Date	Opponent	Site/stadium	Score	Win	Loss	Save	Attendance	Overall record	ACCT Record
May 25	Georgia Tech	Durham Bulls Athletic Park • Durham, NC	W 9–0	Leone (6–2)	Pope (11–4)	Haselden (3)	1,571	40–17	1–0
May 26	Florida State	Durham Bulls Athletic Park • Durham, NC	L 3–6	Gilmartin (11–1)	Sarratt (7–2)	Bennett (13)	2,416	40–18	1–1
May 28	NC State	Durham Bulls Athletic Park • Durham, NC	W 6–3	Campbell (1–0)	Rice (1–1)	Weismann (7)	4,255	41–18	2–1

Clemson Regional

Date	Opponent	Site/stadium	Score	Win	Loss	Save	Attendance	Overall record	NCAAT Record
June 3	(4) Sacred Heart	Doug Kingsmore Stadium • Clemson, SC	W 11–1	Firth (5–1)	Scribner (9–3)	None	5,194	42–18	1–0
June 4	Coastal Carolina	Doug Kingsmore Stadium • Clemson, SC	W 12–7	Haselden (6–1)	Hessler (2–3)	None	5,408	43–18	2–0
June 5	Connecticut	Doug Kingsmore Stadium • Clemson, SC	L 6–7	Vance (1–0)	Weismann (3–5)	None	4,877	43–19	2–1
June 6	Connecticut	Doug Kingsmore Stadium • Clemson, SC	L 1–14	Nappo (10–2)	Pohle (5–2)	Feehan (1)	4,838	43–20	2–2

== 2012 ==
2012 Clemson Tigers baseball
- Conference: Atlantic Coast Conference
- Record: 35–28 (16–14 ACC)
- Head coach: Jack Leggett (19th season)
- Assistant coaches: Dan Pepicilli (3rd season); Bradley Lecroy (5th season); Michael Johnson (4th season)
- Home stadium: Doug Kingsmore Stadium

2012 Atlantic Coast Conference baseball standings
	Conf.						Overall
Team	W		L		T	PCT	W		L		T	PCT
Atlantic
No. 3 Florida State ^{x}‍‍‍^{y}	24	–	6	–	0	.800	50	–	17	–	0	.746
No. 16 NC State ‍‍‍^{y}	19	–	11	–	0	.633	39	–	17	–	0	.696
Clemson ‍‍‍^{y}	16	–	14	–	0	.533	34	–	26	–	0	.567
Wake Forest ‍‍‍	13	–	17	–	0	.433	33	–	24	–	0	.579
Maryland ‍‍‍	10	–	20	–	0	.333	32	–	24	–	0	.571
Boston College ‍‍‍	10	–	20	–	0	.333	21	–	34	–	0	.382
Coastal
No. 5 North Carolina ^{x}‍‍‍^{y}	22	–	8	–	0	.733	44	–	14	–	0	.759
No. 15 Virginia ‍‍‍^{y}	18	–	12	–	0	.600	39	–	16	–	1	.705
No. 21 Miami ‍‍‍^{y}	16	–	14	–	0	.533	36	–	21	–	0	.632
No. 24 Georgia Tech ‍‍‡‍^{y}	12	–	18	–	0	.400	37	–	24	–	0	.607
Virginia Tech ‍‍‍	11	–	19	–	0	.367	34	–	21	–	0	.618
Duke ‍‍‍	9	–	21	–	0	.300	21	–	34	–	0	.382
x – Division champion ‡ – Tournament champion y – Invited to the 2012 NCAA Division I baseball tournament As of June 1, 2012; Rankings from Coaches' Poll

=== Personnel ===
==== Roster ====
2012 Clemson Tigers roster
Pitchers: 6 Dominic Leone – Junior; 15 Mike Kent – (redshirt) Sophomore; 19 Kevin Brady – (redshirt) Junior; 20 Scott Firth – Junior; 21 Kevin Pohle – Sophomore; 23 Daniel Gossett – Freshman; 26 Brock Goodling – Freshman; 27 Kyle Bailey – Freshman; 28 Jonathan Meyer – Junior; 29 David Haselden – Senior; 36 Matt Campbell – Sophomore; 42 Clay Bates – (redshirt) Freshman; 43 Patrick Andrews – Freshman; 51 Joseph Moorefield – (redshirt) Junior	Catchers: 9 Phil Pohl – Senior; 16 Jake Fletcher – Sophomore; 22 Spencer Kieboom – Junior; 30 Garrett Boulware – Freshman; 32 Andrew Cleveland – Freshman; Infielders: 2 Jason Stolz – Senior; 8 Richie Shaffer – Junior; 10 Mike Dunster – Sophomore; 12 Jon McGibbon – Sophomore; 13 Jay Baum – Freshman; 17 Stevie Wilkerson – Sophomore; 37 Kevin Caughman – (redshirt) Sophomore	Outfielders: 1 Dominic Attanasio – Sophomore; 3 Brad Felder – Graduate Student; 4 Thomas Brittle – (redshirt) Junior; 5 Joe Costigan – Sophomore; 18 Tyler Slaton – Freshman

==== Coaches ====
Name	Title	First season at CU	Alma mater
Jack Leggett	Head coach	1994	Maine (1976)
Tom Riginos	Associate head coach	2003	Stetson (1990)
Dan Pepicelli	Assistant head coach	2010	SUNY Cortland (1990)
Michael Johnson	Volunteer Assistant Coach	2009	Clemson (2008)

=== Schedule ===
2012 Clemson Tigers baseball game log
Regular season
February

#	Date	Opponent	Site/stadium	Score	Win	Loss	Save	Attendance	Overall record	ACC record
1	February 17	UAB	Doug Kingsmore Stadium	1–2	Napoleon (1–0)	Campbell (0–1)	Nance (1)	5,944	0–1	–
2	February 18	UAB	Doug Kingsmore Stadium	6–1	Leone (1–0)	Bullard (0–1)		DH	1–1	–
3	February 18	UAB	Doug Kingsmore Stadium	7–4	Pohle (1–0)	Munger (0–1)		5,608	2–1	–
4	February 24	Maine	Doug Kingsmore Stadium	5–6	Balentina (1–0)	Meyer (0–1)	Coughlin (1)	3,793	2–2	–
5	February 25	Maine	Doug Kingsmore Stadium	9–5	Leone (2–0)	Gibbs (0–1)		5,340	3–2	–
6	February 26	Maine	Doug Kingsmore Stadium	9–6	Pohle (2–0)	Connolly (0–1)	Gossett (1)	3,989	4–2	–

March

#	Date	Opponent	Site/stadium	Score	Win	Loss	Save	Attendance	Overall record	ACC record
7	March 2	#2 South Carolina	Riley Park	2–3 (11)	Koumas (1–0)	Gossett (0–1)	Belcher (1)	5,851	4–3	–
8	March 3	@ #2 South Carolina	Carolina Stadium	6–9	Beal (1–0)	Leone (2–1)	Belcher (2)	8,242	4–4	–
9	March 4	#2 South Carolina	Doug Kingsmore Stadium	6–5	Firth (1–0)	Koumas (1–1)		6,039	5–4	–
10	March 7	Holy Cross	Doug Kingsmore Stadium	16–4	Haselden (1–0)	Walker (0–3)		3,564	6–4	–
11	March 9	#6 North Carolina	Doug Kingsmore Stadium	3–4	Emanuel (4–0)	Brady (0–1)	Morin (5)	4,441	6–5	0–1
12	March 10	#6 North Carolina	Doug Kingsmore Stadium	3–6	Taylor (3–0)	Gossett (0–2)	Morin (6)	5,513	6–6	0–2
13	March 11	#6 North Carolina	Doug Kingsmore Stadium	5–6 (11)	Morin (1–0)	Campbell (0–2)		4,368	6–7	0–3
14	March 14	@Western Carolina	Hennon Stadium	4–8	Nadale (2–0)	Haselden (1–1)		1,627	6–8	0–3
15	March 16	Boston College	Doug Kingsmore Stadium	6–4	Brady (1–1)	Stevens (2–1)	Campbell (1)	4,021	7–8	1–3
16	March 17	Boston College	Doug Kingsmore Stadium	6–3	Leone (3–1)	Gordon (1–1)	Meyer (1)	4,598	8–8	2–3
17	March 18	Boston College	Doug Kingsmore Stadium	5–1	Pohle (3–0)	Alvarez (1–3)		4,083	9–8	3–3
18	March 20	Elon	Doug Kingsmore Stadium	6–2	Meyer (1–1)	McCoury (0–1)		3,760	10–8	3–3
19	March 21	Elon	Fluor Field at the West End	4–2	Gossett (1–2)	Whitehead (0–2)	Campbell (2)	2,319	11–8	3–3
20	March 23	@Virginia	Davenport Field	3–6	Silverstein (2–2)	Brady (1–2)	Thompson (3)	3,227	11–9	3–4
21	March 24	@Virginia	Davenport Field	1–5	Kline (4–2)	Leone (3–2)		3,033	11–10	3–5
22	March 25	@Virginia	Davenport Field	3–5	Lewicki (1–1)	Pohle (3–1)	Thompson (4)	3,129	11–11	3–6
23	March 27	@#18 Georgia	Foley Field	10–5	Gossett (2–2)	Crumley (1–1)		2,691	12–11	3–6
24	March 28	Presbyertian	Doug Kingsmore Stadium	4–8	Grammer (1–1)	Meyer (1–2)	Ricchi (1)	3,496	12–12	3–6
25	March 30	#8 Miami	Doug Kingsmore Stadium	3–1	Campbell (1–2)	Erickson (4–3)	Firth (1)	4,117	13–12	4–6
26	March 31	#8 Miami	Doug Kingsmore Stadium	3–1	Leone (4–2)	Whaley (3–2)	Andrews (1)	4,758	14–12	5–6

April

#	Date	Opponent	Site/stadium	Score	Win	Loss	Save	Attendance	Overall record	ACC record
27	April 1	#8 Miami	Doug Kingsmore Stadium	2–4	Salcines (3–0)	Kent (0–1)	Nedeljkovic (2)	4,382	14–13	5–7
28	April 3	Winthrop	Doug Kingsmore Stadium	11–0	Gossett (3–2)	Strong (0–2)		3,281	15–13	5–7
29	April 4	Western Carolina	Doug Kingsmore Stadium	8–13	Blackwell (1–0)	Andrews (0–1)		3,437	15–14	5–7
30	April 6	@Duke	Jack Coombs Field	4–1 (11)	Firth (2–0)	Istler (2–2)		1,582	16–14	6–7
31	April 7	@Duke	Jack Coombs Field	11–5	Leone (5–2)	Swart-(3 4)	Andrews (2)	1,123	17–14	7–7
32	April 8	@Duke	Jack Coombs Field	4–2	Pohle (4–1)	Istler (2–3)	Gossett (2)	1,038	18–14	8–7
33	April 10	Furman	Doug Kingsmore Stadium	12–5	Haselden (2–1)	de Gruy (1–1)	Kent (1)	5,610	19–14	8–7
34	April 11	Georgia	Doug Kingsmore Stadium	7–8	Ripple (1–0)	Andrews (0–2)	Dieterich (6)	4,386	19–15	8–7
35	April 13	NC State	Doug Kingsmore Stadium	7–6 (12)	Firth (3–0)	Tzamtzis (3–3)		4,964	20–15	9–7
36	April 14	NC State	Doug Kingsmore Stadium	1–3	Rodon (6–0)	Leone (5–3)	Overman (3)	5,619	20–16	9–8
37	April 15	NC State	Doug Kingsmore Stadium	3–6	Jernigan (4–1)	Pohle (4–2)	V. Williams (1)	4,605	20–17	9–9
38	April 17	Charleston Southern	Doug Kingsmore Stadium	3–2	Andrews (1–2)	Weekley (1–5)		3,323	21–17	9–9
39	April 20	@Maryland	Shipley Field	5–4	Firth (4–0)	Haslup (3–4)		878	22–17	10–9
40	April 21	@Maryland	Shipley Field	5–3	Leone (6–3)	Harman (5–3)		DH	23–17	11–9
41	April 21	@Maryland	Shipley Field	7–2	Meyer (2–2)	Carroll (3–2)		1,148	24–17	12–9
42	April 24	Coastal Carolina	Doug Kingsmore Stadium	7–10	Burke (5–3)	Andrews (1–3)	B. Smith (1)	3,397	24–18	12–9
43	April 27	@Georgia Tech	Russ Chandler Stadium	5–6 (13)	Didrick (1–0)	Meyer (2–3)		1,627	24–19	12–10
44	April 28	@Georgia Tech	Russ Chandler Stadium	13–7	Kent (1–1)	Isaacs (5–3)		1,947	25–19	13–10
45	April 29	@Georgia Tech	Russ Chandler Stadium	11–8	Gossett (4–2)	Pitts (4–4)		3,626	26–19	14–10

May

#	Date	Opponent	Site/stadium	Score	Win	Loss	Save	Attendance	Overall record	ACC record
46	May 5	College of Charleston	Doug Kingsmore Stadium	4–3 (11)	Gossett (5–2)	Peterson (1–2)		5,030	27–19	14–10
47	May 6	College of Charleston	Doug Kingsmore Stadium	12–3	Pohle (5–2)	Renfro (6–5)		4,382	28–19	14–10
48	May 7	College of Charleston	Doug Kingsmore Stadium	2–4	Pegler (8–2)	Meyer (2–4)	Owings (2)	3,343	28–20	14–10
49	May 8	Tennessee Tech	Doug Kingsmore Stadium	9–8 (10)	Haselden (3–1)	McWhirter (0–4)		3,251	29–20	14–10
50	May 12	#1 Florida State	Doug Kingsmore Stadium	7–2	Gossett (6–2)	Leibrandt (6–2)		5,822	30–20	15–10
51	May 14	#1 Florida State	Doug Kingsmore Stadium	9–7	Pohle (6–2)	Compton (9–1)	Firth (2)	DH	31–20	16–10
52	May 14	#1 Florida State	Doug Kingsmore Stadium	5–9	Smith (2–0)	Meyer (2–5)		4,965	31–21	16–11
53	May 15	Furman	Doug Kingsmore Stadium	9–2	Haselden (4–1)	Gary (3–1)		3,769	32–21	16–11
54	May 17	@Wake Forest	Gene Hooks Field	2–5	Cooney (6–6)	Leone (6–4)	Dimock (12)	648	32–22	16–12
55	May 18	@Wake Forest	Gene Hooks Field	1–2	Dimock (3–3)	Gossett (6–3)		1,241	32–23	16–13
56	May 19	@Wake Forest	Gene Hooks Field	0–7	Holmes (7–2)	Pohle (6–3)		1,461	32–24	16–14

Postseason
ACC Tournament

#	Date	Opponent	Site/stadium	Score	Win	Loss	Save	Attendance	Overall record	ACC Tournament Record
57	May 24	Virginia	NewBridge Bank Park	2–3	Crockett (5–2)	Kent (1–2)	Thompson (12)	3,331	32–25	0–1
58	May 25	Florida State	NewBridge Bank Park	9–7	Andrews (2–3)	Benincasa (4–1)		3,282	33–25	1–1
59	May 26	Georgia Tech	NewBridge Bank Park	1–5	Davies (1–3)	Pohle (6–4)	Cruz (2)	3,272	33–26	1–2

Columbia Regional

#	Date	Opponent	Site/stadium	Score	Win	Loss	Save	Attendance	Overall record	Regional Record
60	June 1	Coastal Carolina	Carolina Stadium	11–3	Pohle (7–4)	Wallace (5–1)	Haselden (1)	6,791	34–26	1–0
61	June 2	South Carolina	Carolina Stadium	4–5 (12)	Beal (4–4)	Brady (1–3)		8,242	34–27	1–1
62	June 3	Coastal Carolina	Carolina Stadium	5–3	Leone (7–4)	Smith (2–2)	Firth (3)	6,111	35–27	2–1
63	June 3	South Carolina	Carolina Stadium	3–4	Montgomery (5–1)	Haselden (4–2)	Webb (3)	8,242	35–28	2–2

=== Rankings ===
Ranking movements Legend: ██ Increase in ranking ██ Decrease in ranking — = Not ranked
	Week																
Poll	Pre	1	2	3	4	5	6	7	8	9	10	11	12	13	14	15	Final
Coaches'	23	23*	19	19	—	—	—	—	—	—	—	—	—	—	—	—	
Baseball America	16	16	15	20	—	—	—	—	—	—	—	—	—	—	—	—	
Collegiate Baseball^	25	25	20	20	—	—	—	—	—	—	30	—	—	—	—	—	
NCBWA†	17	15	13	17	23	23	—	—	—	—	—	—	—	—	—	—	

^ Collegiate Baseball ranked 40 teams in their preseason poll, but only ranked 30 teams weekly during the season.
† NCBWA ranks 30 teams in their preseason poll, but only ranks 25 teams weekly during the season.
* A new poll was not released for this week, so for comparison purposes, the previous week's ranking is inserted in this week's slot.

== 2014 ==
2014 Clemson Tigers baseball

NCAA Nashville Regionals, (0–2)
- Conference: Atlantic Coast Conference

Ranking
- Coaches: No. Received Votes
- Record: 36–25 (15–14 ACC)
- Head coach: Jack Leggett (21st season)
- Assistant coaches: Bradley Lecroy (7th season); Stephen Faris (1st season)
- Pitching coach: Dan Pepicelli (5th season)
- Captains: Garrett Boulware; Daniel Gossett; Jon McGibbon
- Home stadium: Doug Kingsmore Stadium

2014 Atlantic Coast Conference baseball standings
	Conf.						Overall
Team	W		L		T	PCT	W		L		T	PCT
Atlantic
No. 21 Florida State ^{x}‍‍‍^{y}	21	–	9	–	0	.700	43	–	17	–	0	.717
No. 16 Maryland ‍‍‍^{y}	15	–	14	–	0	.517	40	–	23	–	0	.635
Clemson ‍‍‍^{y}	15	–	14	–	0	.517	36	–	25	–	0	.590
Wake Forest ‍‍‍	15	–	15	–	0	.500	30	–	26	–	0	.536
NC State ‍‍‍	13	–	17	–	0	.433	32	–	23	–	0	.582
Boston College ‍‍‍	10	–	20	–	0	.333	22	–	33	–	0	.400
Notre Dame ‍‍‍	9	–	21	–	0	.300	22	–	31	–	0	.415
Coastal
No. 22 Miami (FL) ^{x}‍‍‍^{y}	24	–	6	–	0	.800	44	–	19	–	0	.698
No. 2 Virginia ‍‍‍^{y}	22	–	8	–	0	.733	47	–	14	–	0	.770
Duke ‍‍‍	16	–	14	–	0	.533	33	–	25	–	0	.569
North Carolina ‍‍‍^{y}	15	–	15	–	0	.500	35	–	27	–	0	.565
Georgia Tech ‍‍‡‍^{y}	14	–	16	–	0	.467	37	–	27	–	0	.578
Pittsburgh ‍‍‍	11	–	19	–	0	.367	22	–	30	–	0	.423
Virginia Tech ‍‍‍	9	–	21	–	0	.300	21	–	31	–	1	.406
x – Division champion ‡ – Tournament champion y – Invited to the NCAA tournament As of January 16, 2015; Rankings from Collegiate Baseball

=== Personnel ===
==== Roster ====
2014 Clemson Tigers roster
**Pitchers**: 19 – Brody Koerner – Sophomore; 20 – Drew Moyer – Freshman; 21 – Kevin Pohle – (redshirt) Junior; 22 – Wales Toney – (redshirt) Freshman; 23 – Daniel Gossett – Junior; 27 – Adam Hosler – (redshirt) Freshman; 29 – Jackson Campana – Sophomore; 32 – Clate Schmidt – Sophomore; 33 – Zack Erwin – Sophomore; 36 – Matt Campbell – Senior; 37 – Alex Bostic – Freshman; 39 – Jake Long – (redshirt) Junior; 40 – Kyle Schnell – Junior; 41 – Hunter Hill – Freshman; 42 – Clay Bates – (redshirt) Junior; 43 – Patrick Andrews – Junior; 44 – Matthew Crownover – Sophomore; 47 – Tucker Burgess – Freshman; 48 – Garrett Lovorn – (redshirt) Freshman	**Catchers**: 25 – Chris Okey – Freshman; 30 – Garrett Boulware – Junior; **Infielders**: 3 – Tyler Krieger – Sophomore; 4 – Eli White – Freshman; 6 – Andrew Cox – (redshirt) Freshman; 8 – Weston Wilson – Freshman; 10 – Mike Dunster – Senior; 12 – Jon McGibbon – Senior; 13 – Jay Baum – Junior; 15 – Glenn Batson – Freshman; 17 – Stevie Wilkerson – Senior	**Outfielders**: 1 – Maleeke Gibson – Sophomore; 5 – Joe Costigan – Senior; 9 – Steven Duggar – Sophomore; 11 – Shane Kennedy – Senior; 16 – John Mulkey – (redshirt) Freshman; 18 – Tyler Slaton – Junior; 26 – Reed Rohlman – Freshman; 35 – Mike Triller – (redshirt) Sophomore

==== Coaches ====
2014 clemson tigers baseball coaching staff
- 7 – Jack Leggett – Head coach – 21st season
- 24 – Dan Pepicelli – Associate head coach – 5th season
- 2 – Bradley Lecroy – Assistant coach – 7th season
- 49 – Stephen Faris – Volunteer assistant Coach – 1st season

=== Game log ===
Legend
	Clemson win
	Clemson loss
	Cancellation
**Bold**	Clemson team member
*	Rescheduled
**	Make-Up Game

2014 Clemson Tigers baseball game log (36–25)
Regular season 34–22 (15–14 ACC)
February 6–2 (0–0 ACC)

Date	Opponent	Site/stadium	Score	Win	Loss	Save	Attendance	Overall record	ACC record
February 14	Eastern Michigan	Doug Kingsmore Stadium • Clemson, SC	5–6 (10)	Calibuso (1–0)	**Schmidt (0–1)**	Weber (1)	5,143	0–1	
February 15	Eastern Michigan	Doug Kingsmore Stadium • Clemson, SC	5–3	**Crownover (1–0)**	Sharp (1–0)	**Erwin (1)**	5,229	1–1	
February 16	Eastern Michigan	Doug Kingsmore Stadium • Clemson, SC	9–7	**Campbell (1–0)**	Land (0–1)	None	5,064	2–1	
February 21	Maine	Doug Kingsmore Stadium • Clemson, SC	5–2	**Gossett (1–0)**	Lawrence (0–2)	**Erwin (2)**	4,790	3–1	
February 22	Maine	Doug Kingsmore Stadium • Clemson, SC	13–3	**Crownover (2–0)**	Fullmer (0–1)	None	5,902	4–1	
February 23	Maine	Doug Kingsmore Stadium • Clemson, SC	10–2	**Long (1–0)**	Heath (1–1)	None	4,389	5–1	
February 25	Presbyterian	Doug Kingsmore Stadium • Clemson, SC	4–2	**Schmidt (1–1)**	Kehner (0–2)	**Campbell (1)**	3,759	6–1	
February 28	@ #5 South Carolina	Carolina Stadium • Columbia, SC	6–9	Mincey (1–0)	**Bates (0–1)**	Seddon (2)	8,242	6–2	

March 11–7 (8–3 ACC)

Date	Opponent	Site/stadium	Score	Win	Loss	Save	Attendance	Overall record	ACC record
March 1	vs. #5 South Carolina	Fluor Field at the West End • Greenville, SC	2–10	Wynkoop (3–0)	**Crownover (2–1)**	None	7,182	6–3	
March 2	#5 South Carolina	Doug Kingsmore Stadium • Clemson, SC	5–3	Mincey (2–0)	**Schmidt (1–2)**	None	6,016	6–4	
March 4	@ Western Carolina	Hennon Stadium • Cullowhee, NC	10–18	Sammons (3–0)	**Bostic (0–1)**	None	1,121	6–5	
March 7	Virginia Tech	Doug Kingsmore Stadium • Clemson, SC	7–5	**Campbell (2–0)**	Markey (2–2)	None	3,715	7–6	1–0
March 8	Virginia Tech	Doug Kingsmore Stadium • Clemson, SC	12–2	**Crownover (3–1)**	Scheetz (1–1)	None	5,481	8–5	2–0
March 9	Virginia Tech	Doug Kingsmore Stadium • Clemson, SC	11–4	**Schmidt (2–2)**	McIntyre (1–2)	None	4,566	9–5	3–0
March 12	Appalachian State	Doug Kingsmore Stadium • Clemson, SC	2–1	**Erwin (1–0)**	Mason (0–1)	**Campbell (2)**	3,450	10–5	
March 14	@ Wake Forest	Gene Hooks Field • Winston-Salem, NC	3–4	Fischer (2–1)	**Schmidt (2–3)**	Fossas (4)	638	10–6	3–1
March 15 (Game 1)	@ Wake Forest	Gene Hooks Field • Winston-Salem, NC	16–6	**Crownover (4–1)**	McLeod (2–1)	**Moyer (1)**		11–6	4–1
March 15 (Game 2)	@ Wake Forest	Gene Hooks Field • Winston-Salem, NC	7–4	**Long (2–0)**	Kaden (1–2)	**Campbell (3)**	1,056	12–6	5–1
March 18	@ Georgia Southern	J. I. Clements Stadium • Statesboro, GA	5–14	Frederick (2–0)	**Erwin (1–1)**	None	1,240	12–7	
March 19	@ Georgia Southern	J. I. Clements Stadium • Statesboro, GA	5–4	**Moyer (1–0)**	Alonzo (2–2)	**Campbell (4)**	1,095	13–7	
March 21	#2 Florida State	Doug Kingsmore Stadium • Clemson, SC	9–3	**Gossett (2–0)**	Weaver (4–2)	None	4,948	14–7	6–1
March 22 (Game 1)	#2 Florida State	Doug Kingsmore Stadium • Clemson, SC	1–11	Leibrandt (4–1)	**Crownover (4–2)**	None		14–8	6–2
March 22 (Game 2)	#2 Florida State	Doug Kingsmore Stadium • Clemson, SC	3–4	Smith (3–0)	**Schmidt (2–4)**	Winston (4)	6,016	14–9	6–3
March 25	@ Georgia	Foley Field • Athens, GA	16–4	**Schmidt (3–4)**	Walsh (1–1)	None	2,147	15–9	
March 28 (Game 1)	@ #25 Maryland	Shipley Field • College Park, MD	3–1	**Gossett (3–0)**	Casas (0–1)	**Campbell (5)**		16–9	7–3
March 28 (Game 2)	@ #25 Maryland	Shipley Field • College Park, MD	7–1	**Crownover (5–2)**	Shawaryn (5–1)	None	575	17–9	8–3
March 30	@ #25 Maryland*	Shipley Field • College Park, MD	Cancelled – Rained Out						

April 8–10 (4–8 ACC)

Date	Opponent	Site/stadium	Score	Win	Loss	Save	Attendance	Overall record	ACC record
April 1	Furman	Doug Kingsmore Stadium • Clemson, SC	13–2	**Erwin (2–1)**	Greenfield (1–3)	None	3,554	18–9	
April 2	Winthrop	Doug Kingsmore Stadium • Clemson, SC	4–2	**Schmidt (4–4)**	Sightler (2–2)	**Campbell (6)**	3,683	19–9	
April 5	NC State	Doug Kingsmore Stadium • Clemson, SC	6–1	**Crownover (6–2)**	Rodon (2–5)	None	5,207	20–9	9–3
April 6	NC State	Doug Kingsmore Stadium • Clemson, SC	4–9	Thomas (2–0)	**Erwin (2–2)**	E. Peterson (2)	4,199	20–10	9–4
April 7	NC State	Doug Kingsmore Stadium • Clemson, SC	1–7	O'Donnel (1–0)	**Schmidt (4–5)**	P. Peterson (1)	3,217	20–11	9–5
April 8	Georgia	Doug Kingsmore Stadium • Clemson, SC	2–6	Boling (3–2)	**Koerner (0–1)**	None	4,260	20–12	
April 11	@ #2 Virginia	Davenport Field • Charlottesville, VA	2–3	Kirby (7–1)	**Crownover (6–3)**	Howard (10)	4,221	20–13	9–6
April 12	@ #2 Virginia	Davenport Field • Charlottesville, VA	7–1	**Gossett (4–0)**	Sborz (3–2)	None	4,886	21–13	10–6
April 13	@ #2 Virginia	Davenport Field • Charlottesville, VA	0–1	Waddell (5–1)	**Long (2–1)**	Howard (11)	4,840	21–14	10–7
April 15	Coastal Carolina	Doug Kingsmore Stadium • Clemson, SC	9–6	**Moyer (2–0)**	Hunter (0–1)	**Bates (1)**	3,806	22–14	
April 18	@ Pittsburgh	Cost Field • Pittsburgh, PA	3–2 (11)	**Moyer (3–0)**	Harris (3–5)	None	609	23–14	11–7
April 19	@ Pittsburgh	Cost Field • Pittsburgh, PA	3–0	**Gossett (5–0)**	Zeuch (1–3)	None	986	24–14	12–7
April 20	@ Pittsburgh	Cost Field • Pittsburgh, PA	4–13	Wotherspoon (4–5)	**Long (2–2)**	None	428	24–15	12–8
April 22	Liberty**	Doug Kingsmore Stadium • Clemson, SC	3–4	Clowers (5–0)	**Schmidt (4–6)**	Perritt (9)	3,015	24–16	
April 23	Western Carolina	Doug Kingsmore Stadium • Clemson, SC	11–3	**Erwin (3–2)**	Danielson (0–1)	None	3,892	25–16	
April 25	Miami (FL)	Doug Kingsmore Stadium • Clemson, SC	2–5	Ch. Diaz (7–0)	**Crownover (6–4)**	B. Garcia (12)	4,856	25–17	12–9
April 26	Miami (FL)	Doug Kingsmore Stadium • Clemson, SC	2–3 (12)	Woodrey (3–0)	**Moyer (3–1)**	B. Garcia (13)	5,588	25–18	12–10
April 27	Miami (FL)	Doug Kingsmore Stadium • Clemson, SC	2–10	Radziewski (4–2)	**Long (2–3)**	None	4,300	25–19	12–11

May 9–3 (3–3 ACC)

Date	Opponent	Site/stadium	Score	Win	Loss	Save	Attendance	Overall record	ACC record
May 2	James Madison	Doug Kingsmore Stadium • Clemson, SC	8–0	**Erwin (4–2)**	Huffman (4–6)	None	3,715	26–19	
May 3	James Madison	Doug Kingsmore Stadium • Clemson, SC	9–4	**Campbell (3–0)**	Cundiff (1–2)	None	3,949	27–19	
May 4	UNLV	Fluor Field at the West End • Greenville, SC	6–2	**Gossett (6–0)**	Bonnell (5–4)	None	2,417	28–19	
May 5	UNLV	Doug Kingsmore Stadium • Clemson, SC	5–2	**Long (3–3)**	Oakley (3–5)	**Moyer (2)**	3,581	29–19	
May 7	High Point	Doug Kingsmore Stadium • Clemson, SC	1–0	**Schmidt (5–6)**	Carlson (1–1)	**Campbell (7)**	3,502	30–19	
May 9	@ Notre Dame	Frank Eck Stadium • Notre Dame, IN	1–2	Connaughton (2–5)	**Crownover (6–5)**	Hissa (3)	716	30–20	12–12
May 10	@ Notre Dame	Frank Eck Stadium • Notre Dame, IN	8–0	**Gossett (7–0)**	M. Hearne (4–6)	None	678	31–20	13–12
May 11	@ Notre Dame	Frank Eck Stadium • Notre Dame, IN	3–11	Kerrigan (3–1)	**Erwin (4–3)**	None	702	31–21	13–13
May 13	Furman	Fluor Field at the West End • Greenville, SC	7–2	**Moyer (4–1)**	Dittmar (0–3)	None	2,459	32–21	
May 15	Boston College	Doug Kingsmore Stadium • Clemson, SC	8–4	**Crownover (7–5)**	Gorman (3–7)	None	3,664	33–21	14–13
May 16	Boston College	Doug Kingsmore Stadium • Clemson, SC	1–3	Chin (5–2)	**Gossett (7–1)**	None	4,083	33–22	14–14
May 17	Boston College	Doug Kingsmore Stadium • Clemson, SC	10–9 (13)	**Campbell (4–0)**	Gorman (3–8)	None	3,961	34–22	15–14

Postseason (2–3)
ACC Tournament (2–1)

Date	Opponent	Site/stadium	Score	Win	Loss	Save	Attendance	Overall record	ACC Tournament Record
May 21	Duke	NewBridge Bank Park • Greensboro, NC	5–3	**Crownover (8–5)**	Matuella (1–3)	**Campbell (8)**	3,492	35–22	1–0
May 22	Miami (FL)	NewBridge Bank Park • Greensboro, NC	3–2	**Moyer (5–1)**	Bryan Garcia (5–1)	None	3,417	36–22	2–0
May 23	Georgia Tech	NewBridge Bank Park • Greensboro, NC	0–3	Isaacs (7–5)	**Schmidt (5–7)**	Clay (8)	2,859	36–23	2–1

NCAA tournament: Nashville Regional (0–2)

Date	Opponent	Site/stadium	Score	Win	Loss	Save	Attendance	Overall record	NCAA Nashville Regional Record
May 30	Oregon	Hawkins Field • Nashville, TN	1–18	Thorpe (11–4)	**Crownover (8–6)**	None	1,920	36–24	0–1
May 31	Xavier	Hawkins Field • Nashville, TN	4–6	Klever (7–6)	**Gossett (7–2)**	Campbell (1)	1,891	36–25	0–2

=== Ranking movements ===
Ranking movements Legend: ██ Increase in ranking ██ Decrease in ranking — = Not ranked RV = Received votes
	Week																		
Poll	Pre	1	2	3	4	5	6	7	8	9	10	11	12	13	14	15	16	17	Final
Coaches'	16	16*	20	20	18	18	22	15	14	20	20	RV	24	RV	RV	RV	—	—	—
Baseball America	13	13	11	15	14	13	20	16	14	22	22	—	—	—	—	—	—	—	—
Collegiate Baseball^	21	20	16	30	28	26	28	23	22	—	—	—	—	—	—	—	—	—	—
NCBWA†	16	15	11	19	17	17	20	15	13	21	20	26	22	25	26	26	RV	RV	RV

^ Collegiate Baseball ranked 40 teams in their preseason poll, but only ranked 30 teams weekly during the season.
† NCBWA ranks 30 teams in their preseason poll, but only ranks 25 teams weekly during the season.
* A new poll was not released for this week, so for comparison purposes, the previous week's ranking is inserted in this week's slot.

=== Awards ===
==== ACC Conference awards ====
All-ACC Selections:

•Daniel Gossett – SP (first team)

•Steve Wilkerson – 2B (second team)

•Tyler Krieger – SS (second team)

•Garrett Boulware – C/DH (second team)

•Steven Duggar – OF (Third Team)

•Jay Baum – OF (Third Team)

•Matthew Crownover – SP (Third Team)

==== Golden Spikes Award ====
Semifinalist: •Daniel Gossett – SP

=== 2014 MLB Draft Class ===
The Clemson Tigers had 6 overall picks in the Draft, tied for 15th most in the country.

Player	Team	Round	Pick	Position
Daniel Gossett	Oakland Athletics	2nd	65	RHP
Steve Wilkerson	Baltimore Orioles	8th	241	2B
Matt Campbell	Los Angeles Dodgers	9th	279	RHP
Garrett Boulware	Cincinnati Reds	16th	485	C
Jay Baum	Seattle Mariners	21st	621	SS
Matthew Crownover	San Francisco Giants	21st	628	LHP

== 2015 ==
2015 Clemson Tigers baseball

NCAA Fullerton Regional 0–2
- Conference: Atlantic Coast Conference
- Record: 32–29 (16–13 ACC)
- Head coach: Jack Leggett (22nd season)
- Assistant coaches: Dan Pepicilli (6th season); Bradley Lecroy (8th season); Stephen Faris (2nd season)
- Home stadium: Doug Kingsmore Stadium

2015 Atlantic Coast Conference baseball standings
	Conf.				Overall
Team	W		L	PCT	W		L	PCT
Atlantic
No. 10 Louisville ^{x}‍‍‍^{y}	25	–	5	.833	47	–	18	.723
No. 26 Notre Dame ‍‍‍^{y}	17	–	13	.567	37	–	23	.617
No. 12 Florida State ‍‍‡‍^{y}	17	–	13	.567	44	–	21	.677
Clemson ‍‍‍^{y}	16	–	13	.552	32	–	29	.525
NC State ‍‍‍^{y}	15	–	14	.517	36	–	23	.610
Wake Forest ‍‍‍	12	–	18	.400	27	–	26	.509
Boston College ‍‍‍	10	–	19	.345	27	–	27	.500
Coastal
No. 6 Miami (FL) ^{x}‍‍‍^{y}	22	–	8	.733	50	–	16	.758
No. 1 Virginia ‍‍‍^{y}	15	–	15	.500	44	–	24	.647
North Carolina ‍‍‍	13	–	16	.448	34	–	24	.586
Virginia Tech ‍‍‍	13	–	16	.448	27	–	27	.500
Georgia Tech ‍‍‍	13	–	17	.433	32	–	23	.582
Duke ‍‍‍	10	–	19	.345	31	–	22	.585
Pittsburgh ‍‍‍	9	–	21	.300	20	–	32	.385
x – Division champion ‡ – Tournament champion y – Invited to the NCAA tournament As of June 30, 2015; Rankings from Collegiate Baseball

=== Roster ===
2015 Clemson Tigers roster
**Pitchers**: 17 – Paul Campbell – Freshman; 19 – Brody Koerner – Junior; 20 – Drew Moyer – Sophomore; 21 – Kevin Pohle – (redshirt) Graduate; 22 – Wales Toney – (redshirt) Sophomore; 23 – Charlie Barnes – Freshman; 30 – Hunter Van Horn – Freshman; 32 – Clate Schmidt – Junior; 33 – Zack Erwin – Junior; 36 – Pat Krall – Sophomore; 37 – Alex Bostic – Sophomore; 39 – Jake Long – (redshirt) Senior; 41 – Taylor Vetzel – (redshirt) Sophomore; 42 – Clay Bates – (redshirt) Graduate; 43 – Patrick Andrews – (redshirt) Freshman; 44 – Matthew Crownover – Junior; 47 – Alex Schnell – Freshman; 50 – Mike Goren – Freshman	**Catchers**: 12 – Robert Jolly – Freshman; 25 – Chris Okey – Sophomore; **Infielders**: 3 – Tyler Krieger – Junior; 4 – Eli White – Sophomore; 5 – Chase Pinder – Freshman; 6 – Andrew Cox – (redshirt) Sophomore; 8 – Weston Wilson – Sophomore; 11 – Adamn Renwick – Freshman; 15 – Glenn Batson – (redshirt) Freshman	**Outfielders**: 1 – Maleeke Gibson – (redshirt) Sophomore; 9 – Steven Duggar – Junior; 10 – K.J Bryant – Freshman; 13 – Drew Wharton – Freshman; 18 – Tyler Slaton – Senior; 26 – Reed Rohlman – (redshirt) Freshman; 35 – Mike Triller – (redshirt) Junior

=== Coaches ===
2015 Clemson Tigers baseball coaching staff
- 7 – Jack Leggett – Head coach – 22nd season
- 24 – Dan Pepicelli – Associate head coach – 6th season
- 2 – Bradley Lecroy – Assistant coach – 8th season
- 49 – Stephen Faris – Volunteer assistant Coach – 2nd season

=== Schedule ===
Legend
	Clemson win
	Clemson loss
	Cancellation
**Bold**	Clemson team member
*	Rescheduled
**	Make-Up Game

2015 Clemson Tigers baseball game log
Regular season
February

Date	Opponent	Rank	Site/stadium	Score	Win	Loss	Save	Attendance	Overall record	ACC record
February 13	West Virginia	#28	Doug Kingsmore Stadium • Clemson, SC	**L** 0–2	Smith (1–0)	**Crownover (0–1)**	Bostic (1)	4,890	0–1	
February 14	West Virginia	#28	Doug Kingsmore Stadium • Clemson, SC	**W** 4–2	**Erwin (1–0)**	Vance (0–1)	**Moyer (1)**	5,215	1–1	
February 15	West Virginia	#28	Doug Kingsmore Stadium • Clemson, SC	**L** 1–6	Donato (1–0)	**Koerner (0–1)**	None	3,694	1–2	
February 20	Maine		Lake Olmstead Stadium • Augusta, GA (Note: Clemson's series with Maine was played in Augusta, Georgia due to cold weather in Clemson.)	**W** 10–1	**Crownover (1–1)**	Marks (0–1)	None	307	2–2	
February 21	Maine		Lake Olmstead Stadium • Augusta, GA	**W** 5–4^{14}	**Schnell (1–0)**	Butler (0–1)	None		3–2	
February 22	Maine		Lake Olmstead Stadium • Augusta, GA	**W** 10–2	**Koerner (1–)**	Courtney (0–2)	None	1,461	4–2	
February 25	Wofford		Doug Kingsmore Stadium • Clemson, SC	**W** 11–5	**Barnes (1–0)**	Anderson (1–1)	None	3,280	5–2	
February 27	#15 South Carolina		Doug Kingsmore Stadium • Clemson, SC	**W** 11–4	**Crownover (2–0)**	Crowe (1–1)	**Schnell (1)**	6,272	6–2	
February 28	vs. #15 South Carolina		Fluor Field at the West End • Greenville, SC	**L** 1–4	Wynkoop (2–1)	**Erwin (1–1)**	Widener (3)'	7,175	6–3	

March

Date	Opponent	Rank	Site/stadium	Score	Win	Loss	Save	Attendance	Overall record	ACC record
March 2	at #17 South Carolina		Carolina Stadium • Columbia, SC	**W** 7–0	**Koerner (2–1)**	Reagan (0–1)	None	8,242	7–3	
March 3	Winthrop		Doug Kingsmore Stadium • Clemson, SC	**L** 4–5	Strong (2–0)	**Barnes (1–1)**	Strain (3)	3,209	7–4	
March 6	at NC State		Doak Field • Raleigh, NC	**W** 6–4	**Crownover (3–0)**	Wilder (1–3)	**Moyer (2)**	496	8–4	1–0
March 7	at NC State		Doak Field • Raleigh, NC	**L** 3–8	Britt (2–0)	**Erwin (1–2)**	None	1,508	8–5	1–1
March 8	at NC State		Doak Field • Raleigh, NC	**L** 6–14	Piedmonte (1–0)	**Koerner (2–2)**	None	1,745	8–6	1–2
March 11	vs. Michigan State		Fluor Field at the West End • Greenville, SC	**L** 6–8	Mockbee (1–0)	**Barnes (1–2)**	None	1,685	8–7	
March 14	Notre Dame		Doug Kingsmore Stadium • Clemson, SC	**W** 6–1	**Crownover (4–0)**	Kerrigan (1–2)	None		9–7	2–2
March 14	Notre Dame		Doug Kingsmore Stadium • Clemson, SC	**L** 6–11	Guenther (1–0)	**Krall (0–1)**	Solomon (4)	4,961	9–8	2–3
March 15	Notre Dame		Doug Kingsmore Stadium • Clemson, SC	**L** 1–5	McCarty (3–1)	**Erwin (1–3)**	None	4,343	9–9	2–4
March 17	at Coastal Carolina		Springs Brooks Stadium • Conway, SC	**L** 5–9	Sawczak (1–1)	**Campbell (0–1)**	Holmes (1)	2,825	9–10	
March 20	at Virginia Tech		English Field • Blacksburg, VA	**W** 4–0^{10}	**Moyer (1–0)**	Scherzer (1–1)	None	403	10–10	3–4
March 21	at Virginia Tech		English Field • Blacksburg, VA	**W** 15–8	**Koerner (3–2)**	McGarity (2–2)	None	1,549	11–10	4–4
March 22	at Virginia Tech		English Field • Blacksburg, VA	**L** 3–4^{12}	Monaco (1–0)	**Schmidt (0–1)**	None	1–484	11–11	4–5
March 24	at Western Carolina		Hennon Stadium • Cullowhee, NC	**W** 19–2	**Schnell (2–0)**	Sikes (1–1)	None	1,053	12–11	
March 27	Wake Forest		Doug Kingsmore Stadium • Clemson, SC	**L** 2–8	Pirro (6–1)	**Crownover (4–1)**	None	3,750	12–12	4–6
March 28	Wake Forest		Doug Kingsmore Stadium • Clemson, SC	**L** 3–7	Craig (1–1)	Koerner (3–3)'	Dunshee (2)	4,386	12–13	4–7
March 29	Wake Forest		Doug Kingsmore Stadium • Clemson, SC	**W** 6–2	**Erwin (2–3)**	Johnstone (1–2)	None	4,098	13–13	5–7
March 31	Furman		Doug Kingsmore Stadium • Clemson, SC	**W** 5–4	**Vetzel (1–0)**	Warford (3–1)	None	3,735	14–13	

April

Date	Opponent	Rank	Site/stadium	Score	Win	Loss	Save	Attendance	Overall record	ACC record
April 1	Presbyterian		Doug Kingsmore Stadium • Clemson, SC	**L** 4–5	Deal (2–0)	**Campbell (0–2)**	Kehner (3)	3,966	14–14	
April 3	North Carolina		Doug Kingsmore Stadium • Clemson, SC	**W** 5–2	**Crownover (5–1)**	Gallen (1–2)	**Vetzel (1)**	4,802	15–14	6–7
April 4	North Carolina		Doug Kingsmore Stadium • Clemson, SC	**W** 5–4^{11}	**Krall (1–1)**	Thornton (1–3)	None	5,067	16–14	7–7
April 5	North Carolina		Doug Kingsmore Stadium • Clemson, SC	**L** 7–8	Moss (5–0)	**Koerner (3–4)**	Thornton (5)	4,239	16–15	7–8
April 7	Georgia		Doug Kingsmore Stadium • Clemson, SC	**L** 2–3	Tucker (1–1)	**Vetzel (1–1)**	Cheek (5)	4,598	16–16	
April 8	Charleston Southern		Doug Kingsmore Stadium • Clemson, SC	**L** 3–4^{10}	Hubbard (3–0)	**Bostic (0–2)**	None	3,312	16–17	
April 10	at Boston College		Eddie Pellagrini Diamond at John Shea Field • Chestnut Hill, MA	**W** 15–6	**Crownover (6–1)**	King (0–2)	**Campbell (1)**	337	17–17	8–8
April 11	at Boston College		Eddie Pellagrini Diamond at John Shea Field • Chestnut Hill, MA	**L** 7–8	Dunn (4–2)	**Vetzel (1–2)**	Adams (1)	1,203	17–18	8–9
April 12	at Boston College		Eddie Pellagrini Diamond at John Shea Field • Chestnut Hill, MA	**W** 6–3	**Koerner (4–4)**	Murphy (0–2)	**Krall (1)**	654	18–18	9–9
April 14	Western Carolina		Doug Kingsmore Stadium • Clemson, SC	**W** 14–2	**Long (1–0)**	Nail (2–3)	None	3,637	19–18	
April 15	Gardner-Webb		Doug Kingsmore Stadium • Clemson, SC	**W** 7–5	**Schmidt (1–1)**	Walker (1–3)	**Krall (2)**	3,197	20–18	
April 18	Duke		Doug Kingsmore Stadium • Clemson, SC	**W** 6–2	**Crownover (7–1)**	Haviland (1–1)	None		21–18	10–9
April 18	Duke		Doug Kingsmore Stadium • Clemson, SC	**W** 8–1	**Erwin (3–3)**	Istler (3–3)	None	5,531	22–18	11–9
April 21	at Georgia		Foley Field • Athens, GA	**L** 0–7	Walsh (4–1)	**Koerner (4–5)**	None	2,490	22–19	
April 24	at Georgia Tech		Russ Chandler Stadium • Atlanta, GA	**L** 2–4	Ryan (6–1)	**Vetzel (1–3)**	None	1,825	22–20	11–10
April 25	at Georgia Tech		Russ Chandler Stadium • Atlanta, GA	**W** 11–3	**Erwin (7–3)**	Pitts (0–5)	None	1,257	23–20	12–10
April 26	at Georgia Tech		Russ Chandler Stadium • Atlanta, GA	**L** 4–5^{10}	Ryan (7–1)	**Schmidt (1–2)**	None	1,791	23–21	12–11

May

Date	Opponent	Rank	Site/stadium	Score	Win	Loss	Save	Attendance	Overall record	ACC record
May 2	#3 Louisville		Doug Kingsmore Stadium • Clemson, SC	**W** 9–1	**Crownover (8–1)**	Funkhouser (6–3)	None	4,394	24–21	13–11
May 3	#3 Louisville		Doug Kingsmore Stadium • Clemson, SC	**L** 3–5	Leland (4–0)	**Erwin (4–4)**	Burdi (6)	4,447	24–22	13–12
May 4	#3 Louisville		Doug Kingsmore Stadium • Clemson, SC	**L** 5–9	Henzman (4–1)	**Schmidt (1–3)**	None	3,968	24–23	13–13
May 5	at Wofford		Russell C. King Field • Spartanburg, SC	**L** 9–17	Leftwich (6–2)	**Krall (1–2)**	Stillman (14)	1,187	24–24	
May 6	#20 College of Charleston		Doug Kingsmore Stadium • Clemson, SC	**W** 6–3	**Schmidt (2–3)**	Bauer (3–3)	**Vetzel (2)**	3,712	25–24	
May 8	Georgia Southern		Doug Kingsmore Stadium • Clemson, SC	**W** 13–5	**Crownover (9–1)**	Challenger (5–2)	None	3,765	26–24	
May 9	Georgia Southern		Doug Kingsmore Stadium • Clemson, SC	**W** 5–4	**Erwin (5–4)**	Frederick (2–1)	**Vetzel (3)**	4,866	27–24	
May 10	Georgia Southern		Doug Kingsmore Stadium • Clemson, SC	**L** 4–7	Richman (7–1)	**Krall (1–3)**	Paesano (3)	3,689	27–25	
May 12	at Furman		Fluor Field at the West End • Greenville, SC	**W** 23–15	**Krall (2–3)**	Warford (4–3)	None		28–25	
May 14	at #8 Florida State		Mike Martin Field at Dick Howser Stadium • Tallahassee, FL	**W** 4–1	**Crownover (10–1)**	Biegalski (5–4)	**Krall (3)**		29–25	14–13
May 15	at #8 Florida State		Mike Martin Field at Dick Howser Stadium • Tallahassee, FL	**W** 7–0	**Erwin (6–4)**	Compton (3–3)	**Vetzel (4)**		30–25	15–13
May 16	at #8 Florida State		Mike Martin Field at Dick Howser Stadium • Tallahassee, FL	**W** 9–6	**Long (2–0)**	Carlton (3–5)	None		31–25	16–13

Postseason
ACC Tournament

Date	Opponent	Rank	Site/stadium	Score	Win	Loss	Save	Attendance	Overall record	ACCT Record
May 20	#10 Florida State	#28	Durham Bulls Athletic Park • Durham, NC	**L** 1–3	Biegalski (6–4)	**Crownover (10–2)**	Strode (13)	3,155	31–26	0–1
May 21	#5 Louisville	#28	Durham Bulls Athletic Park • Durham, NC	**W** 7–2	**Erwin (7–4)**	Funkhouser (7–5)	None	2,858	32–26	1–1
May 22	North Carolina	#28	Durham Bulls Athletic Park • Durham, NC	**L** 3–6	Bukausas (5–3)	**Long (2–1)**	Kelley (5)	3,630	32–27	1–2

NCAA Fullerton Regional

Date	Opponent	Rank	Site/stadium	Score	Win	Loss	Save	Attendance	Overall record	NCAAT Record
May 29	vs. #18 Arizona State	#28	Goodwin Field • Fullerton, CA	**L** 4–7	Kellogg (9–2)	**Crownover (10–3)**	Burr (14)	1,478	32–28	0–1
May 30	vs. Pepperdine	#28	Goodwin Field • Fullerton, CA	**L** 8–10	Gamboa (6–2)	**Krall (2–4)**	None		32–29	0–2

=== Rankings ===
Ranking movements Legend: ██ Increase in ranking ██ Decrease in ranking — = Not ranked RV = Received votes
	Week																		
Poll	Pre	1	2	3	4	5	6	7	8	9	10	11	12	13	14	15	16	17	Final
Coaches'	RV	RV*	—	—	—	—	—	—	—	—	—	—	—	—	—	—			
Baseball America	24	—	—	—	—	—	—	—	—	—	—	—	—	—	—	—			
Collegiate Baseball^	28	—	—	—	—	—	—	—	—	—	—	—	—	—	28	28			
NCBWA†	27	RV	RV	RV	RV	—	—	—	—	—	—	—	—	—	—	—			

^ Collegiate Baseball ranked 40 teams in their preseason poll, but only ranked 30 teams weekly during the season.
† NCBWA ranks 30 teams in their preseason poll, but only ranks 25 teams weekly during the season.
* A new poll was not released for this week, so for comparison purposes, the previous week's ranking is inserted in this week's slot.

== 2016 ==
2016 Clemson Tigers baseball

ACC Tournament champions Clemson Regional, 2–2
- Conference: Atlantic Coast Conference
- Record: 44–20 (16–14 ACC)
- Head coach: Monte Lee (1st season)
- Assistant coaches: Bradley LeCroy (9th season); Andrew See (1st season); Greg Starbuck (1st season)
- Home stadium: Doug Kingsmore Stadium

2016 Atlantic Coast Conference baseball standings
	Conf.				Overall
Team	W		L	PCT	W		L	PCT
Atlantic
No. 11 Louisville ^{x}‍‍‍^{y}	22	–	8	.733	48	–	12	.800
No. 14 Florida State ‍‍‍^{y}	16	–	10	.615	38	–	20	.655
No. 20 NC State ‍‍‍^{y}	15	–	13	.536	36	–	20	.643
No. 18 Clemson ‍‍‡‍^{y}	16	–	14	.533	43	–	18	.705
No. 16 Boston College ‍‍‍^{y}	13	–	15	.464	35	–	22	.614
Wake Forest ‍‍‍^{y}	13	–	17	.433	35	–	25	.583
Notre Dame ‍‍‍	11	–	17	.393	27	–	27	.500
Coastal
No. 8 Miami (FL) ^{x}‍‍‍^{y}	21	–	7	.750	46	–	11	.807
No. 17 Virginia ‍‍‍^{y}	19	–	11	.633	38	–	20	.655
Duke ‍‍‍^{y}	14	–	15	.483	33	–	23	.589
Georgia Tech ‍‍‍^{y}	13	–	16	.448	36	–	24	.600
North Carolina ‍‍‍	13	–	17	.433	34	–	21	.618
Pittsburgh ‍‍‍	10	–	18	.357	25	–	26	.490
Virginia Tech ‍‍‍	6	–	24	.200	19	–	36	.345
x – Division champion ‡ – Tournament champion y – Invited to the NCAA tournament As of June 4, 2016; Rankings from Collegiate Baseball

=== Personnel ===
==== Roster ====
2016 Clemson Tigers roster
**Pitchers**: 16 – Alex Eubanks – (redshirt) Freshman; 17 – Paul Campbell – Sophomore; 19 – Brooks Crawford – Freshman; 23 – Charlie Barnes – Sophomore; 24 – Jake Higginbotham – Freshman; 30 – Hunter Van Horn – Sophomore; 31 – Andrew Towns – Junior; 32 – Clate Schmidt – Senior; 36 – Pat Krall – Junior; 37 – Alex Bostic – Junior; 42 – Zach Goodman – Freshman; 43 – Patrick Andrews – (redshirt) Graduate; 44 – Ryley Gilliam – Freshman; 45 – Andrew Papp – Freshman; 47 – Alex Schnell – Sophomore; 48 – Garrett Lovorn – (redshirt) Junior; 50 – Mike Goren – (redshirt) Freshman	**Catchers**: 12 – Robert Jolly – Sophomore; 25 – Chris Okey – Junior; 33 – Austin O'Boyle – Sophomore; **Outfielders**: 1 – Maleeke Gibson – RJr.; 5 – Chase Pinder – Sophomore; 10 – K.J. Bryant – (redshirt) Freshman; 13 – Drew Wharton – Sophomore; 26 – Reed Rohlman – (redshirt) Sophomore; 28 – Seth Beer – Freshman; 35 – Mike Triller – (redshirt) Graduate	**Infielders**: 4 – Eli White – Junior; 6 – Andrew Cox – (redshirt) Junior; 8 – Weston Wilson – Junior; 9 – Jordan Greene – Freshman; 11 – Adam Renwick – Sophomore; 15 – Glenn Batson – (redshirt) Sophomore; 27 – Chris Williams – Sophomore; 29 – Jackson Campana – (redshirt) Junior; 40 – Grayson Byrd – Sophomore

==== Coaches ====
2016 Clemson Tigers baseball coaching staff
- Monte Lee – Head coach – 1st season
- Bradley Lecroy – Assistant coach – 9th season
- Andrew See – Assistant coach – 1st season
- Greg Starbuck – Volunteer assistant Coach – 1st season

=== Schedule ===
Legend
	Clemson win
	Clemson loss
	Cancellation
**Bold**	Clemson team member
*	Non-Conference game
†	Make-Up Game
‡	New Doug Kingsmore Stadium Attendance Record

2016 Clemson Tigers baseball game log
Regular season
February

Date	Opponent	Rank	Site/stadium	Score	Win	Loss	Save	Attendance	Overall record	ACC record
Feb 19	Maine*		Doug Kingsmore Stadium • Clemson, SC	**L** 3–4	Johnson (1–0)	**Eubanks (0–1)**	Fullmer (1)	5,497	0–1	
Feb 20	Maine*		Doug Kingsmore Stadium • Clemson, SC	**W** 9–4	**Schmidt (1–0)**	Murphy (0–1)	None	4,618	1–1	
Feb 21	Maine*		Doug Kingsmore Stadium • Clemson, SC	**W** 19–2	**Higginbotham (1–0)**	Gelinas (0–1)	None	4,570	2–1	
Feb 26	James Madison*		Doug Kingsmore Stadium • Clemson, SC	**W** 6–1	**Barnes (1–0)**	Hoover (1–1)	**Eubanks (1)**	4,019	3–1	
Feb 27	James Madison*		Doug Kingsmore Stadium • Clemson, SC	**W** 10–1	**Schmidt (2–0)**	Harlow (0–1)	None	5,158	4–1	
Feb 28	James Madison*		Doug Kingsmore Stadium • Clemson, SC	**W** 11–2	**Crawford (1–0)**	Withers (0–1)	None	4,836	5–1	

March

Date	Opponent	Rank	Site/stadium	Score	Win	Loss	Save	Attendance	Overall record	ACC record
Mar 1	Wofford*		Doug Kingsmore Stadium • Clemson, SC	**W** 7–0	**Eubanks (1–1)**	Caskey (1–1)	None	3,552	6–1	
Mar 4	at #18 South Carolina*		Carolina Stadium • Columbia, SC	**L** 1–8	Schmidt (3–0)	**Barnes (1–1)**	None	8,242	6–2	
Mar 5	vs #18 South Carolina*		Fluor Field at the West End • Greenville, SC	**W** 5–0	**Schmidt (3–0)**	Webb (2–1)	**Krall (1)**	7,216	7–2	
Mar 6	#18 South Carolina*		Doug Kingsmore Stadium • Clemson, SC	**W** 4–1	**Eubanks (2–1)**	Widener (0–1)	**Bostic (1)**	6,524 ‡	8–2	
Mar 9	Winthrop*	#20	Doug Kingsmore Stadium • Clemson, SC	**W** 4–3	**Bostic (1–0)**	Cook (0–1)	None	3,867	9–2	
Mar 11	at Wake Forest	#20	Gene Hooks Field at Wake Forest Baseball Park • Winston-Salem, NC	**L** 4–6	Dunshee (3–1)	**Barnes (1–2)**	Craig (3)	1,017	9–3	0–1
Mar 12	at Wake Forest	#20	Gene Hooks Field at Wake Forest Baseball Park • Winston-Salem, NC	**W** 6–5	**Krall (1–0)**	Johnstone (1–2)	**Bostic (2)**	1,134	10–3	1–1
Mar 13	at Wake Forest	#20	Gene Hooks Field at Wake Forest Baseball Park • Winston-Salem, NC	**W** 13–8	**Crawford (2–0)**	Roberts (0–1)	None	646	11–3	2–1
Mar 15	at The Citadel*	#19	Joseph P. Riley Jr. Park • Charleston, SC	**W** 12–1	**Higginbotham (2–0)**	Bialakis (0–1)	None	5,524	12–3	
Mar 16	at The Citadel*	#19	Joseph P. Riley Jr. Park • Charleston, SC	**W** 5–4	**Bostic (2–0)**	Smith (1–1)	None	4,689	13–3	
Mar 18	#22 Boston College	#19	Doug Kingsmore Stadium • Clemson, SC	**W** 6–2	**Schmidt (4–0)**	King (3–1)	None	4,993	14–3	3–1
Mar 19	#22 Boston College	#19	Doug Kingsmore Stadium • Clemson, SC	**W** 6–1	**Barnes (2–2)**	Je. Adams (2–2)	**Crawford (1)**	4,518	15–3	4–1
Mar 20	#22 Boston College	#19	Doug Kingsmore Stadium • Clemson, SC	**W** 3–2^{10}	**Bostic (3–0)**	Nicklas (3–1)	None	3,675	16–3	5–1
Mar 22	Presbyterian*	#12	Doug Kingsmore Stadium • Clemson, SC	**W** 8–4	**Higginbotham (3–0)**	Sauer (2–2)	None	3,871	17–3	
Mar 25	at #5 Miami (FL)	#12	Alex Rodriguez Park at Mark Light Field • Coral Gables, FL	**L** 8–9	B. Garcia (2–0)	**Bostic (3–1)**	None	2,811	17–4	5–2
Mar 26	at #5 Miami (FL)	#12	Mark Light Field at Alex Rodriguez Park • Coral Gables, FL	**L** 4–5 ^{11}	Bartow (2–0)	**Bostic (3–2)**	None	3,246	17–5	5–3
Mar 27	at #5 Miami (FL)	#12	Mark Light Field at Alex Rodriguez Park • Coral Gables, FL	**L** 5–10	D. Garcia (4–2)	**Eubanks (2–2)**	None	2,480	17–6	5–4
Mar 29	at Furman*	#17	Fluor Field at the West End • Greenville, SC	**W** 9–7	**Krall (2–0)**	Mullen (0–2)	None	4,013	18–6	
Mar 30	at Western Carolina*	#17	Hennon Stadium • Cullowhee, NC	**W** 10–8	**Gilliam (1–0)**	Davis (3–1)	None	1,409	19–6	

April

Date	Opponent	Rank	Site/stadium	Score	Win	Loss	Save	Attendance	Overall record	ACC record
Apr 1	Pittsburgh	#17	Doug Kingsmore Stadium • Clemson, SC	**W** 14–6	**Schmidt (5–0)**	Falk (2–3)	None	4,416	20–6	6–4
Apr 2	Pittsburgh	#17	Doug Kingsmore Stadium • Clemson, SC	**L** 5–15	Zeuch (2–0)	**Barnes (2–3)**	Chentouf (2)	6,165	20–7	6–5
Apr 3	Pittsburgh	#17	Doug Kingsmore Stadium • Clemson, SC	**W** 4–3	**Krall (3–0)**	Falk (2–4)	None	5,597	21–7	7–5
Apr 5	at Georgia*	#17	Foley Field • Athens, GA	**W** 11–6	**Krall (4–0)**	Moody (0–3)	None	4,128	22–7	
Apr 8	at Duke	#17	Jack Coombs Field • Durham, NC	**L** 3–5	Clark (3–3)	**Schmidt (5–1)**	Stallings (3)	517	22–8	7–6
Apr 9	at Duke	#17	Jack Coombs Field • Durham, NC	**W** 3–2	**Barnes (3–3)**	Stallings (1–2)	**Krall (2)**	603	23–8	8–6
Apr 10	at Duke	#17	Jack Coombs Field • Durham, NC	**L** 2–1	McAfee (5–2)	**Eubanks (2–3)**	None	717	23–9	8–7
Apr 12	Western Carolina*	#23	Doug Kingsmore Stadium • Clemson, SC	**W** 7–6^{10}	**Krall (5–0)**	Sikes (0–1)	None	3,440	24–9	
Apr 15	at #6 Louisville	#23	Jim Patterson Stadium • Louisville, KY	**L** 2–15	McKay (7–1)	**Schmidt (5–2)**	None	2,738	24–10	8–8
Apr 16	at #6 Louisville	#23	Jim Patterson Stadium • Louisville, KY	**L** 2–7	Harrington (8–1)	**Barnes (3–4)**	None	4,950	24–11	8–9
Apr 17	at #6 Louisville	#23	Jim Patterson Stadium • Louisville, KY	**L** 8–9	Hummel (2–0)	**Krall (5–1)**	None	2,818	24–12	8–10
Apr 19	Georgia	#23	Doug Kingsmore Stadium • Clemson, SC	**W** 12–0	**Gilliam (2–0)**	Gist (3–2)	None	4,736	25–12	
Apr 22	Georgia Tech	#23	Doug Kingsmore Stadium • Clemson, SC	**W** 8–7	**Krall (6–1)**	Gorst (0–1)	None	4,062	26–12	9–10
Apr 23	Georgia Tech	#23	Doug Kingsmore Stadium • Clemson, SC	**L** 1–16	Parr (7–0)	**Eubanks (2–4)**	None	6,235	26–13	9–11
Apr 24	Georgia Tech	#23	Doug Kingsmore Stadium • Clemson, SC	**L** 5–7	Dulaney (2–3)	**Gilliam (2–1)**	Gorst (10)	4,818	26–14	9–12
Apr 30	#3 Florida State		Doug Kingsmore Stadium • Clemson, SC	**W** 10–3	**Eubanks (3–4)**	Compton (5–3)	None	5,304	27–14	10–12

May

Date	Opponent	Rank	Site/stadium	Score	Win	Loss	Save	Attendance	Overall record	ACC record
May 1	#3 Florida State		Doug Kingsmore Stadium • Clemson, SC	**L** 2–11	Carlton (5–2)	**Schmidt (5–3)**	None	4,196	27–15	10–13
May 2	#3 Florida State		Doug Kingsmore Stadium • Clemson, SC	**W** 7–3	**Krall (7–1)**	Holton (2–3)	None	3,331	28–15	11–13
May 4	Furman*		Doug Kingsmore Stadium • Clemson, SC	**W** 7–6^{11}	**Eubanks (4–4)**	Crawford (0–4)	None	4,549	29–15	
May 6	#9 NC State		Doug Kingsmore Stadium • Clemson, SC	**W** 10–5	**Barnes (4–4)**	Wilder (3–2)	**Eubanks (2)**	4,480	30–15	12–13
May 7	#9 NC State		Doug Kingsmore Stadium • Clemson, SC	**L** 9–20	Brown (7–1)	**Gilliam (2–2)**	None	4,957	30–16	12–14
May 8	#9 NC State		Doug Kingsmore Stadium • Clemson, SC	**W** 2–1	**Krall (8–1)**	DeJuneas (2–2)	None	4,239	31–16	13–14
May 10	College of Charleston*	#23	Doug Kingsmore Stadium • Clemson, SC	**W** 13–3	**Andrews (1–0)**	Hunt (0–1)	None	4,768	32–16	
May 11	College of Charleston*	#23	Doug Kingsmore Stadium • Clemson, SC	**L** 4–11	Ocker (4–0)	**Schmidt (5–4)**	None	3,602	32–17	
May 13	at Georgia Southern*	#23	J. I. Clements Stadium • Statesboro, GA	**W'** 12–1	**Barnes (5–4)**	Challenger (5–4)	None	1,108	33–17	
May 14	at Georgia Southern*	#23	J. I. Clements Stadium • Statesboro, GA	**L** 6–7	Hughes (4–2)	**Eubanks (4–5)**	None	1,416	33–18	
May 15	at Georgia Southern*	#23	J. I. Clements Stadium • Statesboro, GA	**W** 17–4	**Gilliam (3–2)**	Simmons (3–2)	None	1,059	34–18	
May 17	Charleston Southern*	#23	Doug Kingsmore Stadium • Clemson, SC	**W** 3–2	**Schmidt (6–4)**	Piriz (2–5)	**Eubanks (3)**	4,782	35–18	
May 19	at Notre Dame	#18	Frank Eck Stadium • Notre Dame, IN	**W** 2–1^{11}	**Crawford (3–0)**	Guenther (3–5)	**Krall (3)**	442	36–18	14–14
May 20	at Notre Dame	#18	Frank Eck Stadium • Notre Dame, IN	**W** 11–1	**Schmidt (7–4)**	Mearne (8–2)	None	555	37–18	15–14
May 21	at Notre Dame	#18	Frank Eck Stadium • Notre Dame, IN	**W** 6–2	**Euobanks (5–5)**	Cresta (0–1)	**Krall (4)**	610	38–18	16–14

Postseason
ACC Tournament

Date	Opponent	Rank	Site/stadium	Score	Win	Loss	Save	Attendance	Overall record	ACCT Record
May 26	#8 Virginia	#15	Durham Bulls Athletic Park • Durham, NC	**W** 5–4	**Krall (9–1)**	Shambora (5–1)	None	3,259	39–18	1–0
May 27	#3 Louisville	#15	Durham Bulls Athletic Park • Durham, NC	**W** 5–3	**Schmidt (8–4)**	McKay (11–3)	**Krall (5)**	2,958	40–18	2–0
May 28	Wake Forest	#15	Durham Bulls Athletic Park • Durham, NC	**W** 5–4	**Krall (10–1)**	Dunshee (9–5)	None	4,417	41–18	3–0
May 29	#12 Florida State	#15	Durham Bulls Athletic Park • Durham, NC	**W** 18–13	**Bostic (4–2)**	E. Voyles (1–2)	None	4,863	42–18	4–0

NCAA Clemson Regional

Date	Opponent	Rank	Site/stadium	Score	Win	Loss	Save	Attendance	Overall record	Regional Record
June 3	(4) Western Carolina	#9 (1)	Doug Kingsmore Stadium • Clemson, SC	**W** 24–10	**Barnes** (6–4)	Anderson (1–4)	None	5,589	43–18	1–0
June 4	#24 (2) Oklahoma State	#9 (1)	Doug Kingsmore Stadium • Clemson, SC	**L** 2–12	Buffett (7–3)	**Schmidt** (8–5)	None	5,629	43–19	1–1
June 5 (1)	(4) Western Carolina	#9 (1)	Doug Kingsmore Stadium • Clemson, SC	**W** 15–3	**Eubanks** (6–5)	Bray (2–5)	None	4,227	44–19	2–1
June 5 (2)	#24 (2) Oklahoma State	#9 (1)	Doug Kingsmore Stadium • Clemson, SC	**L** 2–9	Elliott (9–2)	**Krall** (10–2)	Cobb (3)	4,407	44–20	2–2

=== Rankings ===
Ranking movements Legend: ██ Increase in ranking ██ Decrease in ranking — = Not ranked
	Week																		
Poll	Pre	1	2	3	4	5	6	7	8	9	10	11	12	13	14	15	16	17	Final
Coaches'	—	—*	—	21	17	22	16	20	22	—	—	24	18	15	10	10			15
Baseball America	—	—	—	—	17	—	21	22	—	—	—	—	23	23	15	9			17
Collegiate Baseball^	—	—	20	19	12	17	17	17	22	—	—	—	—	30	28	11	18	18	18
NCBWA†	—	—	29	25	17	24	18	17	—	22	25	23	22	16	14	10	15		18

^ Collegiate Baseball ranked 40 teams in their preseason poll, but only ranked 30 teams weekly during the season.
† NCBWA ranks 30 teams in their preseason poll, but only ranks 25 teams weekly during the season.
* A new poll was not released for this week, so for comparison purposes, the previous week's ranking is inserted in this week's slot.

== 2017 ==
2017 Clemson Tigers baseball

NCAA Clemson Regional, 3–2
- Conference: Atlantic Coast Conference

Ranking
- Coaches: No. 22
- CB: No. 23
- Record: 42–21 (17–13 ACC)
- Head coach: Monte Lee (2nd season)
- Assistant coaches: Bradley LeCroy (10th season); Andrew See (2nd season); Greg Starbuck (2nd season)
- Home stadium: Doug Kingsmore Stadium

2017 Atlantic Coast Conference baseball standings
	Conf.				Overall
Team	W		L	PCT	W		L	PCT
Atlantic
No. 5 Louisville ^{x}‍‍‍^{y}	23	–	6	.793	53	–	12	.815
No. 12 Wake Forest ‍‍‍^{y}	19	–	11	.633	43	–	20	.683
No. 25 Clemson ‍‍‍^{y}	17	–	13	.567	42	–	21	.667
No. 30 NC State ‍‍‍^{y}	16	–	14	.533	36	–	25	.590
No. 6 Florida State ‍‍‡‍^{y}	14	–	14	.500	46	–	23	.667
Boston College ‍‍‍	11	–	19	.367	25	–	28	.472
Notre Dame ‍‍‍	10	–	20	.333	26	–	32	.448
Coastal
No. 17 North Carolina ^{x}‍‍‍^{y}	23	–	7	.767	49	–	14	.778
No. 21 Virginia ‍‍‍^{y}	18	–	12	.600	43	–	16	.729
Miami (FL) ‍‍‍	16	–	13	.552	31	–	27	.534
Duke ‍‍‍	12	–	18	.400	30	–	28	.517
Georgia Tech ‍‍‍	11	–	19	.367	27	–	28	.491
Pittsburgh ‍‍‍	9	–	21	.300	23	–	30	.434
Virginia Tech ‍‍‍	9	–	21	.300	23	–	32	.418
x – Division champion ‡ – Tournament champion y – Invited to the NCAA tournament Rankings from Collegiate Baseball

=== Personnel ===
==== Roster ====
2017 Clemson Tigers roster
**Pitchers**: 16 – Alex Eubanks – (redshirt) Sophomore; 17 – Paul Campbell – Junior; 19 – Brooks Crawford – Sophomore; 20 – Jeremy Beasley – Junior; 22 – Tyler Jackson – (redshirt) Graduate; 23 – Charlie Barnes – Junior; 24 – Jake Higginbotham – Sophomore; 29 – Blake Holliday – Freshman; 30 – Mitchell Miller – Freshman; 32 – Jacob Hennessy – Freshman; 35 – Ryan Miller – Junior; 36 – Pat Krall – Senior; 37 – Ryne Huggins – Freshman; 39 – Travis Marr – Freshman; 40 – Owen Griffith – Freshman; 43 – Patrick Andrews – (redshirt) Graduate; 44 – Ryley Gilliam – Sophomore; 47 – Alex Schnell – Junior	**Catchers**: 12 – Robert Jolly – Junior; 27 – Chris Williams – Junior; 49 – Kyle Wilkie – Freshman; 33 – Austin O'Boyle – Junior; **Outfielders**: 5 – Chase Pinder – Junior; 10 – K.J. Bryant – (redshirt) Sophomore; 13 – Drew Wharton – Junior; 15 – Weston Jackson – (redshirt) Graduate; 26 – Reed Rohlman – (redshirt) Junior	**Infielders**: 3 – Grant Cox – (redshirt) Freshman; 4 – Grayson Byrd – (redshirt) Sophomore; 6 – Andrew Cox – (redshirt) Graduate; 8 – Logan Davidson – Freshman; 9 – Jordan Greene – Sophomore; 11 – Adam Renwick – Junior; 25 – Patrick Cromwell – Junior; 28 – Seth Beer – Sophomore; 51 – Carson Spiers – Freshman

==== Coaches ====
2017 clemson tigers baseball coaching staff
- Monte Lee – Head coach – 2nd season
- Bradley Lecroy – Assistant coach – 10th season
- Andrew See – Assistant coach – 2nd season
- Greg Starbuck – Volunteer assistant Coach – 2nd season

=== Schedule ===
Legend
	Clemson win
	Clemson loss
	Cancellation
**Bold**	Clemson team member
*	Non-Conference game
†	Make-Up Game
‡	New Doug Kingsmore Stadium Attendance Record

2017 Clemson Tigers baseball game log
Regular season
February

Date	Opponent	Rank	Site/stadium	Score	Win	Loss	Save	Attendance	Overall record	ACC record
Feb 17	Wright State*	#10	Doug Kingsmore Stadium • Clemson, SC	**L** 4–6	Foster (1–0)	**Jackson (0–1)**	Weiss (1)	5,683	0–1	
Feb 18	Wright State*	#10	Doug Kingsmore Stadium • Clemson, SC	**W** 6–2	**Krall (1–0)**	Collins (0–1)	None	4,360	1–1	
Feb 19	Wright State*	#10	Doug Kingsmore Stadium • Clemson, SC	**L** 2–9	Sexton (1–0)	**Eubanks (0–1)**	None	5,239	1–2	
Feb 22	Western Carolina*	#12	Doug Kingsmore Stadium • Clemson, SC	**W** 11–5	**Crawford (1–0)**	Nail (0–2)	**Gilliam (1)**	3,496	2–2	
Feb 24	Elon*	#12	Doug Kingsmore Stadium • Clemson, SC	**W** 1–0^{13}	**Crawford (2–0)**	Kirby (0–1)	None	5,394	3–2	
Feb 25	Elon*	#12	Doug Kingsmore Stadium • Clemson, SC	**W** 13–5	**Krall (2–0)**	Welhaf (1–1)	None	5,665	4–2	
Feb 26	Elon*	#12	Doug Kingsmore Stadium • Clemson, SC	**W** 3–0	**Eubanks (1–1)**	Brnovich (0–1)	**Hennessy (1)**	4,108	5–2	
Feb 28	Wofford*	#12	Doug Kingsmore Stadium • Clemson, SC	**W** 9–2	**Jackson (1–1)**	Ellmyer (0–1)	None	3,604	6–2	

March

Date	Opponent	Rank	Site/stadium	Score	Win	Loss	Save	Attendance	Overall record	ACC record
Mar 3	#4 South Carolina*	#12	Doug Kingsmore Stadium • Clemson, SC	**L** 0–2	Schmidt (2–0)	**Barnes (0–1)**	Johnson (4)	6,212	6–3	
Mar 4	at #4 South Carolina*	#12	Fluor Field at the West End • Greenville, SC	**W** 8–7	**Gilliam (1–0)**	Scott (0–1)	None	7,460	7–3	
Mar 5	at #4 South Carolina*	#12	Founders Park • Columbia, SC	**W** 5–3 (11)	**Schnell (1–0)**	Murray (0–1)	None	8,242	8–3	
Mar 8	at Michigan State*	#9	Fluor Field at the West End • Greenville, SC	**W** 9–2	**Jackson (2–1)**	Mockbee (3–1)	None	3,176	9–3	
Mar 10	Notre Dame	#9	Doug Kingsmore Stadium • Clemson, SC	**W** 4–1	**Barnes (1–1)**	Bielack (0–3)	**Hennessy (2)**	5,170	10–3	1–0
Mar 11	Notre Dame	#9	Doug Kingsmore Stadium • Clemson, SC	**W** 6–5	**Crawford (3–0)**	Smoyer (0–2)	None	5,005	11–3	2–0
Mar 12	Notre Dame	#9	Doug Kingsmore Stadium • Clemson, SC	**W** 4–0	**Eubanks (2–1)**	Bass (1–2)	None	3,707	12–3	3–0
Mar 14	Yale*	#9	Doug Kingsmore Stadium • Clemson, SC	**W** 10–6	**Hennessy (1–0)**	Politz (2–1)	None	3,372	13–3	
Mar 15	Yale*	#9	Doug Kingsmore Stadium • Clemson, SC	**W** 10–8	**Crawford (4–0)**	Sapsford (0–1)	None	3,261	14–3	
Mar 17	#11 Virginia	#9	Doug Kingsmore Stadium • Clemson, SC	**L** 0–2	Lynch (4–1)	**Barnes (1–2)**	Doyle (4)	3,995	14–4	3–1
Mar 18	#11 Virginia	#9	Doug Kingsmore Stadium • Clemson, SC	**W** 7–6	**Eubanks (3–1)**	Sperling (3–2)	**Miller (1)**	4,490	15–4	4–1
Mar 19	#11 Virginia	#9	Doug Kingsmore Stadium • Clemson, SC	**W** 12–1	**Krall (3–0)**	Haseley (3–1)	None	4,526	16–4	5–1
Mar 21	at College of Charleston*	#6	CofC Baseball Stadium at Patriot's Point • Mount Pleasant, SC	**W** 8–4	**Jackson (3–1)**	McKinley (0–3)	None	1,638	17–4	
Mar 24	at Boston College	#6	Bill Beck Field • Kingston, RI (Note: The series against Boston College was relocated to Rhode Island's stadium due to poor field conditions at Eddie Pellagrini Diamond at John Shea Field.)	**W** 8–2	**Barnes (2–2)**	Stevens (2–2)	**Andrews (1)**	107	18–4	6–1
Mar 25	at Boston College	#6	Bill Beck Field • Kingston, RI	**W** 1–0	**Eubanks (4–1)**	Witkowski (0–1)	None	336	19–4	7–1
Mar 26	at Boston College	#6	Bill Beck Field • Kingston, RI	**W** 2–0	**Krall (4–0)**	Stromberg (0–1)	**Gilliam (2)**	227	20–4	8–1
Mar 28	Furman*	#5	Doug Kingsmore Stadium • Clemson, SC	**W** 8–0	**Jackson (4–0)**	Verbeke (0–2)	None	4,454	21–4	
Mar 29	Winthrop*	#5	Doug Kingsmore Stadium • Clemson, SC	**W** 6–5 (11)	**Miller (1–0)**	Whitaker (1–2)	None	4,130	22–4	
Mar 31	at Georgia Tech	#5	Russ Chandler Stadium • Atlanta, GA	**W** 11–6	**Barnes (3–2)**	Curry (3–3)	None	1,439	23–4	9–1

April

Date	Opponent	Rank	Site/stadium	Score	Win	Loss	Save	Attendance	Overall record	ACC record
Apr 1	at Georgia Tech	#5	Russ Chandler Stadium • Atlanta, GA	**L** 5–1	Shadday (2–1)	**Eubanks (4–2)**	None	2,725	23–5	9–2
Apr 2	at Georgia Tech	#5	Russ Chandler Stadium • Atlanta, GA	**W**13–6	**Krall (5–0)**	Schniederjan 1–2	None	2,107	24–5	10–2
Apr 4	at Georgia*	#4	Foley Field • Athens, GA	**W** 4–0	**Jackson (5–1)**	Avidano (2–1)	None	3,302	25–5	
Apr 7	Virginia Tech	#4	Doug Kingsmore Stadium • Clemson, SC	**W** (12–1)	**Barnes (4–2)**	Coward (5–1)	None	4,995	26–5	11–2
Apr 8	Virginia Tech	#4	Doug Kingsmore Stadium • Clemson, SC	**W** 6–3	**Eubanks (5–2)**	Naughton (2–5)	**Gilliam (3)**	6,104	27–5	12–2
Apr 9	Virginia Tech	#4	Doug Kingsmore Stadium • Clemson, SC	**W** 8–3	**Krall (6–0)**	Anderson (5–3)	None	4,705	28–5	13–2
Apr 11	Charleston Southern*	#4	Doug Kingsmore Stadium • Clemson, SC	**W** 6–5 (11)	**Beasley (1–0)**	Hartsell (1–4)	None	5,280	29–5	
Apr 15	at #25 Florida State	#4	Mike Martin Field at Dick Howser Stadium • Tallahassee, FL	**W** 12–10	**Gilliam (2–0)**	Carlton (2–3)	None	5,753	30–5	14–2
Apr 16	at #25 Florida State	#4	Mike Martin Field at Dick Howser Stadium • Tallahassee, FL	**L** 7–3	Holton (5–1)	**Eubanks (5–3)**	None	4,010	30–6	14–3
Apr 17	at #25 Florida State	#4	Mike Martin Field at Dick Howser Stadium • Tallahassee, FL	**L** 7–6	Byrd (2–1)	**Hennessy (1–1)**	None	4,046	30–7	14–4
Apr 19	Georgia*	#4	Doug Kingsmore Stadium • Clemson, SC	**W** 9–7	**Jackson (6–1)**	Shepard (0–2)	**Hennessy (3)**	4,550	31–7	
Apr 21	#17 Wake Forest	#4	Doug Kingsmore Stadium • Clemson, SC	**W** 8–7	**Hennessy (2–1)**	Roberts (1–2)	None	5,352	32–7	15–4
Apr 22	#17 Wake Forest	#4	Doug Kingsmore Stadium • Clemson, SC	**W** 11–0	**Eubanks (6–3)**	Sellers (3–3)	None	–	33–7	16–4
Apr 22	#17 Wake Forest	#4	Doug Kingsmore Stadium • Clemson, SC	**L** 8–3	Johnstone (6–0)	**Krall (6–1)**	None	6,030	33–8	16–5
Apr 25	College of Charleston	#3	Doug Kingsmore Stadium • Clemson, SC	**W** 7–2	**Jackson (7–1)**	White (1–5)	None	4,232	34–8	
Apr 28	at #3 North Carolina	#3	Boshamer Stadium • Chapel Hill, NC	**L** 5–1	Bukauskas (8–0)	**Barnes (4–3)**	None	3,720	34–9	16–6
Apr 29	at #3 North Carolina	#3	Boshamer Stadium • Chapel Hill, NC	**L** 5–4	Daniels (4–0)	**Gilliam (2–1)**	Hiatt (13)	3,514	34–10	16–7
Apr 30	at #3 North Carolina	#3	Boshamer Stadium • Chapel Hill, NC	**L** 3–2 (10)	Hiatt (2–1)	**Beasley (1–1)**	None	2,880	34–11	16–8

May

Date	Opponent	Rank	Site/stadium	Score	Win	Loss	Save	Attendance	Overall record	ACC record
May 6	Nevada*	#6	Doug Kingsmore Stadium • Clemson, SC	**W** 5–2	**Barnes (5–3)**	Charpie (2–6)	**Beasley (1)**	4,042	35–11	
May 7	Nevada*	#6	Doug Kingsmore Stadium • Clemson, SC	**L** 7–5	Nowaczewski (4–5)	**Eubanks (6–4)**	McMahan (5)	4,168	35–12	
May 8	Nevada*	#6	Doug Kingsmore Stadium • Clemson, SC	**W** 9–4	**Krall (7–1)**	Ohl (3–2)	**Gilliam (4)**	3,824	36–12	
May 9	at Furman*	#7	Fluor Field at the West End • Greenville, SC	**W** 10–5	**Jackson (8–1)**	Crawford (1–4)	None	4,138	37–12	
May 12	#2 Louisville	#7	Doug Kingsmore Stadium • Clemson, SC	**L** 4–2	McKay (8–3)	**Barnes (5–4)**	Henzman (15)	4,405	37–13	16–9
May 13	#2 Louisville	#7	Doug Kingsmore Stadium • Clemson, SC	**L** 6–4	McClure (7–1)	**Beasley (1–2)**	Wolf (1)	5,164	37–14	16–10
May 14	#2 Louisville	#7	Doug Kingsmore Stadium • Clemson, SC	**L** 6–4	Bennett (5–0)	**Krall (7–2)**	Henzman (16)	4,572	37–15	16–11
May 16	#24 Coastal Carolina*	#12	Doug Kingsmore Stadium • Clemson, SC	**W** 11–8	**Gilliam (3–1)**	Bilous (3–2)	None	5,138	38–15	
May 18	at NC State	#12	Doak Field • Raleigh, NC	**L** 3–2	Staley (2–3)	**Griffith (0–1)**	Adler (1)	2,628	38–16	16–12
May 19	at NC State	#12	Doak Field • Raleigh, NC	**L** 12–10	Brown (4–1)	**Eubanks (6–5)**	Adler (2)	3,048	38–17	16–13
May 20	at NC State	#12	Doak Field • Raleigh, NC	**W** 15–6	**Krall (8–2)**	Bienlien (3–3)	None	3,048	39–17	17–13

Postseason
ACC Tournament

Date	Opponent	Rank	Site/stadium	Score	Win	Loss	Save	Attendance	Overall record	ACCT Record
May 23	Duke	#14	Louisville Slugger Field • Louisville, KY	**L** 6–3	Hendrix (3–1)	**Griffith (0–2)**	None	3,381	39–18	0–1
May 26	#10 Virginia	#14	Jim Patterson Stadium (Note: The ACC tournament game against Virginia was relocated to the University of Louisville's Jim Patterson Stadium due to weather and two postponed games on Wednesday May 24 at the ACC baseball tournament.) • Louisville, KY	**L** 10–2	Lynch (7–4)	**Krall (8–3)**	None	598	39–19	0–2

NCAA Clemson Regional

Date	Opponent	Rank	Site/stadium	Score	Win	Loss	Save	Attendance	Overall record	Regional Record
June 2	(4) UNC Greensboro	#15 (1)	Doug Kingsmore Stadium • Clemson, SC	**W** 5–4	**Eubanks (7–5)**	Hensley (7–8)	**Krall (1)**	5,095	40–19	1–0
June 3	(2) Vanderbilt	#15 (1)	Doug Kingsmore Stadium • Clemson, SC	**L** 9–4	Wright (5–5)	**Barnes (5–5)**	None	5,097	40–20	1–1
June 4	(4) UNC Greensboro	#15 (1)	Doug Kingsmore Stadium • Clemson, SC	**W** 6–3	**Griffith (1–2)**	Loats (8–3)	None	3,571	41–20	2–1
June 4	(2) Vanderbilt	#15 (1)	Doug Kingsmore Stadium • Clemson, SC	**W** 6–0	**Jackson (9–1)**	Fellows (3–3)	None	3,731	42–20	3–1
June 5	(2) Vanderbilt	#15 (1)	Doug Kingsmore Stadium • Clemson, SC	**L** 8–0	Ruppenthal (3–3)	**Eubanks (7–6)**	None	4,462	42–21	3–2

=== Rankings ===
Ranking movements Legend: ██ Increase in ranking ██ Decrease in ranking
	Week																		
Poll	Pre	1	2	3	4	5	6	7	8	9	10	11	12	13	14	15	16	17	Final
Coaches'	12	12*	12*	11	10	7	5	4	4	4	3	6	7	12	14	15	15	15	22
Baseball America	10	15	15	9	9	6	5	5	5	5									
Collegiate Baseball^	12	22	22	15	14	12	6	5	4	5	5	9	9	14	17	17	25	25	25
NCBWA†	13	20	17	10	11	8	5	4	4	4	4	7	7	12	15	17	24	24	24

^ Collegiate Baseball ranked 40 teams in their preseason poll, but only ranked 30 teams weekly during the season.
† NCBWA ranks 30 teams in their preseason poll, but only ranks 25 teams weekly during the season.
* A new poll was not released for this week, so for comparison purposes, the previous week's ranking is inserted in this week's slot.

== 2018 ==
2018 Clemson Tigers baseball

ACC Atlantic Division Champion, ACC Regular season Co–Champion

Clemson Regional, 2–2
- Conference: Atlantic Coast Conference

Ranking
- Coaches: No. 18
- CB: No. 17
- Record: 47–16 (22–8 ACC)
- Head coach: Monte Lee (3rd season)
- Assistant coaches: Bradley LeCroy (11th season); Andrew See (3rd season); Greg Starbuck (3rd season)
- Home stadium: Doug Kingsmore Stadium

2018 Atlantic Coast Conference baseball standings
	Conf.				Overall
Team	W		L	PCT	W		L	PCT
Atlantic
No. 17 Clemson ^{x}‍‍‍^{y}	22	–	8	.733	47	–	16	.746
No. 22 NC State ‍‍‍^{y}	19	–	11	.633	42	–	18	.700
No. 23 Louisville ‍‍‍^{y}	18	–	12	.600	45	–	19	.703
Florida State ‍‍‡‍^{y}	16	–	13	.552	43	–	19	.694
Wake Forest ‍‍‍	13	–	17	.433	25	–	32	.439
Notre Dame ‍‍‍	12	–	18	.400	24	–	30	.444
Boston College ‍‍‍	7	–	22	.241	17	–	32	.347
Coastal
No. 3 North Carolina ^{x}‍‍‍^{y}	22	–	8	.733	44	–	18	.710
No. 11 Duke ‍‍‍^{y}	18	–	11	.621	45	–	18	.714
Miami (FL) ‍‍‍	16	–	13	.552	28	–	26	.519
Georgia Tech ‍‍‍	14	–	16	.467	31	–	27	.534
Virginia ‍‍‍	12	–	17	.414	29	–	25	.537
Pittsburgh ‍‍‍	11	–	19	.367	29	–	26	.527
Virginia Tech ‍‍‍	8	–	22	.267	21	–	33	.389
x – Division champion ‡ – Tournament champion y – Invited to the NCAA tournament As of June 17, 2018; Rankings from Collegiate Baseball

=== Personnel ===
==== Roster ====
2018 Clemson Tigers roster
**Pitchers**: 19 – Brooks Crawford – Junior; 20 – Mat Clark – (redshirt) Freshman; 22 – Sam Weatherly – Freshman; 23 – Carson Spiers – Sophomore; 24 – Jake Higginbotham – (redshirt) Sophomore; 29 – Spencer Strider – Freshman; 30 – Mitchell Miller – Sophomore; 32 – Jacob Hennessy – Sophomore; 35 – Ryan Miller – Senior; 37 – Ryne Huggins – (redshirt) Freshman; 39 – Travis Marr – (redshirt) Freshman; 40 – Owen Griffith – Sophomore; 41 – Bo Gobin – (redshirt) Freshman; 44 – Ryley Gilliam – Junior; 45 – Holt Jones – Freshman; 47 – Alex Schnell – Senior; 48 – Bryce Bowen – Freshman; 50 – Andrew Coker – (redshirt) Freshman	**Catchers**: 10 – Kyle Wilkie – Sophomore; 27 – Chris Williams – Senior; 51 – Drew Donathan – Freshman; **Outfielders**: 1 – Kier Meredith – Freshman; 5 – Sam Hall – Freshman; 12 – Robert Jolly – Senior; 13 – Drew Wharton – Senior; 12 – Bo Majkowski – Freshman; 26 – Matt Cooper – Freshman; 31 – Bryce Teodosio – Freshman	**Infielders**: 4 – Grayson Byrd – (redshirt) Junior; 8 – Logan Davidson – Sophomore; 9 – Jordan Greene – Junior; 11 – Adam Renwick – Senior; 17 – Justin Hawkins – (redshirt) Junior; 25 – Patrick Cromwell – Senior; 28 – Seth Beer – Junior

==== Coaches ====
2018 clemson tigers baseball coaching staff
- Monte Lee – Head coach – 3rd season
- Bradley Lecroy – Assistant coach – 11th season
- Andrew See – Assistant coach – 3rd season
- Greg Starbuck – Volunteer assistant Coach – 3rd season

=== Schedule ===
Legend
	Clemson win
	Clemson loss
	Cancellation
**Bold**	Clemson team member
*	Non-Conference game
†	Make-Up Game

2018 Clemson Tigers baseball game log
Regular season
February

Date	Opponent	Rank	Site/stadium	Score	Win	Loss	Save	Attendance	Overall record	ACC record
Feb 16	William & Mary*	12	Doug Kingsmore Stadium • Clemson, SC	**W** 5–4	Gilliam (1–0)	Strain (0–1)	None	6,062	1–0	0–0
Feb 17	William & Mary*	12	Doug Kingsmore Stadium • Clemson, SC	**W** 7–6	Strider (1–0)	Sujak (0–1)	**Spiers (1)**	4,711	2–0	0–0
Feb 18	William & Mary*	12	Doug Kingsmore Stadium • Clemson, SC	**W** 2–1	Higginbotham (1–0)	Haney (0–1)	**Gilliam (1)**	5,406	3–0	0–0
Feb 20	Furman*	11	Doug Kingsmore Stadium • Clemson, SC	**W** 12–4	Miller (1–0)	Verbeke (1–1)	None	4,417	4–0	0–0
Feb 23	#10 Dallas Baptist*	11	Doug Kingsmore Stadium • Clemson, SC	**W** 12–1	Hennessy (1–0)	Johnson (1–1)	None	5,313	5–0	0–0
Feb 24	#10 Dallas Baptist*	11	Doug Kingsmore Stadium • Clemson, SC	**W** 9–1	Crawford (1–0)	Martinson (0–1)	**Strider (1)**	4,842	6–0	0–0
Feb 24	#10 Dallas Baptist*	11	Doug Kingsmore Stadium • Clemson, SC	**W** 3–2	Higginbotham (2–0)	Eldred (1–1)	**Gilliam (2)**	4,842	7–0	0–0
Feb 27	Winthrop*	10	Doug Kingsmore Stadium • Clemson, SC	**W** 9–8 (10)	Clark (1–0)	Ohs (0–1)	None	4,543	8–0	0–0

March

Date	Opponent	Rank	Site/stadium	Score	Win	Loss	Save	Attendance	Overall record	ACC record
Mar 2	at #23 South Carolina*	10	Founders Park • Columbia, SC	**L** 2–3	Demurias (1–0)	**Gilliam** (1–1)	None	8,242	8–1	0–0
Mar 3	vs #23 South Carolina*	10	Fluor Field at the West End • Greenville, SC	**W** 5–1	**Clark** (2–0)	Morris (2–1)	**Miller** (1)	7,385	9–1	0–0
Mar 4	#23 South Carolina*	10	Doug Kingsmore Stadium • Clemson, SC	**W** 8–7	**Gilliam** (2–1)	Mlodzinsk (0–2)	None	6,312	10–1	0–0
Mar 6	Wofford*	10	Doug Kingsmore Stadium • Clemson, SC	**W** 6–3	**Spiers** (1–0)	Hershman (0–1)	None	4,273	11–1	0–0
Mar 7	vs Michigan State*	10	Fluor Field at the West End • Greenville, SC	**W** 9–7	**Jones** (1–0)	Flohr (0–2)	**Spiers** (2)	3,975	12–1	0–0
Mar 9	Georgia Tech	10	Doug Kingsmore Stadium • Clemson, SC	**W** 3–2	**Miller** (2–0)	Datoc (0–2)	None	4,800	13–1	1–0
Mar 10	Georgia Tech	10	Doug Kingsmore Stadium • Clemson, SC	**W** 7–3	**Strider** (2–0)	Thomas (2–1)	**Spiers** (3)	5,959	14–1	2–0
Mar 10	Georgia Tech	10	Doug Kingsmore Stadium • Clemson, SC	**W** 13–2	**Higginbotham** (3–0)	Hurter (0–1)	None	5,959	15–1	3–0
Mar 13	Charleston Southern*	5	Doug Kingsmore Stadium • Clemson, SC	**W** 5–0	**Jones** (2–0)	Bennett (0–2)	None	4,486	16–1	3–0
Mar 16	#23 NC State	5	Doug Kingsmore Stadium • Clemson, SC	**L** 0–4	Bienlien (2–0)	**Hennessy** (1–1)	Klyman (3)	4,679	16–2	3–1
Mar 17	#23 NC State	5	Doug Kingsmore Stadium • Clemson, SC	**L** 1–6	Brown (4–0)	**Crawford** (1–1)	Johnston (4)	5,008	16–3	3–2
Mar 18	#23 NC State	5	Doug Kingsmore Stadium • Clemson, SC	**L** 4–5	O'Donnell (1–1)	**Miller** (2–1)	None	4,540	16–4	3–3
Mar 20	at Coastal Carolina*	12	Springs Brooks Stadium • Conway, SC	**L** 5–9	Causey (1–0)	**Spiers** (1–1)	None	4,130	16–5	3–3
Mar 23	at #17 Louisville	12	Jim Patterson Stadium • Louisville, KY	**W** 3–1	**Hennessy** (2–1)	Wolf (3–1)	**Miller** (2)	2,519	17–5	4–3
Mar 25	at #17 Louisville	12	Jim Patterson Stadium • Louisville, KY	**W** 4–3	**Marr** (1–0)	Smiddy (2–1)	**Gilliam** (3)	2,587	18–5	5–3
Mar 25	at #17 Louisville	12	Jim Patterson Stadium • Louisville, KY	**L** 1–5	Bennett (2–0)	**Higginbotham** (3–1)	None	2,587	18–6	5–4
Mar 27	at Furman*	12	Fluor Field at the West End • Greenville, SC	**W** 10–5	**Marr** (2–0)	Alley (2–2)	None	2,249	19–6	5–4
Mar 29	Boston College	12	Doug Kingsmore Stadium • Clemson, SC	**W** 10–2	**Hennessy** (3–1)	Stevens (3–3)	None	4,301	20–6	6–4
Mar 30	Boston College	12	Doug Kingsmore Stadium • Clemson, SC	**W** 9–4	**Crawford** (2–1)	Metzdorf (0–4)	**Miller** (3)	5,088	21–6	7–4
Mar 31	Boston College	12	Doug Kingsmore Stadium • Clemson, SC	**W** 8–3	**Marr** (3–0)	Rapp (2–3)	**Gilliam** (4)	5,324	22–6	8–4

April

Date	Opponent	Rank	Site/stadium	Score	Win	Loss	Save	Attendance	Overall record	ACC record
Apr 3	#18 Coastal Carolina*	8	Doug Kingsmore Stadium • Clemson, SC	**W** 6–1	**Strider** (3–0)	Peavyhouse (1–3)	None	6,540	23–6	8–4
Apr 6	at Notre Dame	8	Frank Eck Stadium • Notre Dame, IN	**L** 2–5	Tully (4–1)	**Hennessy** (3–2)	Kmet (5)	414	23–7	8–5
Apr 8	at Notre Dame	8	Frank Eck Stadium • Notre Dame, IN	**W** 6–3	**Crawford** (3–1)	Sheehan (1–3)	None	326	24–7	9–5
Apr 8	at Notre Dame	8	Frank Eck Stadium • Notre Dame, IN	**W** 5–2	**Higginbotham** (4–1)	Junker (0–3)	**Gilliam** (5)	326	25–7	10–5
Apr 10	vs #21 Georgia*	7	SRP Park • North Augusta, SC	**L** 3–6	Smith (5–1)	**Strider** (3–1)	Schunk (5)	5,801	25–8	10–5
Apr 13	Miami (FL)	7	Doug Kingsmore Stadium • Clemson, SC	**L** 11–12 (12)	Bartow (2–0)	**Spiers** (1–2)	None	5,350	25–9	10–6
Apr 14	Miami (FL)	7	Doug Kingsmore Stadium • Clemson, SC	**L** 1–6	McKendry (5–4)	**Crawford** (3–2)	None	6,513	25–10	10–7
Apr 14	Miami (FL)	7	Doug Kingsmore Stadium • Clemson, SC	**W** 8–3	**Higginbotham** (5–1)	Cabezas (3–4)	None	6,513	26–10	11–7
Apr 17	at #24 Georgia*	14	Foley Field • Athens, GA	**L** 1–6	Proctor (3–2)	**Marr** (3–1)	None	2,822	26–11	11–7
Apr 20	at Wake Forest	14	Gene Hooks Field • Winston-Salem, NC	**W** 7–5	**Miller** (3–1)	Witt (0–3)	None	1,352	27–11	12–7
Apr 21	at Wake Forest	14	Gene Hooks Field • Winston-Salem, NC	**W** 4–3	**Crawford** (4–2)	Supple (3–2)	**Gilliam** (6)	1,864	28–11	13–7
Apr 22	at Wake Forest	14	Gene Hooks Field • Winston-Salem, NC	**W** 9–4	**Higginbotham** (6–1)	Peluse (6–1)	**Gilliam** (7)	1,319	29–11	14–7
Apr 24	Kennesaw State*	14	Doug Kingsmore Stadium • Clemson, SC	**W** 9–4	**Strider** (4–1)	Dupree (1–1)	**Miller** (4)	4,330	30–11	14–7
Apr 25	Presbyterian*	14	Doug Kingsmore Stadium • Clemson, SC	**W** 14–4	**Marr** (4–1)	Jahn (0–2)	None	4,933	31–11	14–7
Apr 27	at Virginia	14	Davenport Field • Charlottesville, VA	**W** 3–2	**Hennessey** (4–2)	Casey (5–3)	**Gilliam** (8)	3,455	32–11	15–7
Apr 28	at Virginia	14	Davenport Field • Charlottesville, VA	**W** 5–4	**Crawford** (5–2)	Lynch (3–4)	**Gilliam** (9)	4,395	33–11	16–7
Apr 29	at Virginia	14	Davenport Field • Charlottesville, VA	**W** 9–8	**Miller** (4–1)	Murdock (1–1)	**Gilliam** (10)	4,376	34–11	17–7

May

Date	Opponent	Rank	Site/stadium	Score	Win	Loss	Save	Attendance	Overall record	ACC record
May 5	#16 Florida State	10	Doug Kingsmore Stadium • Clemson, SC	**L** 2–3 (13)	Van Eyk (3–0)	**Gilliam** (2–2)	None	5,379	34–12	17–8
May 6	#16 Florida State	10	Doug Kingsmore Stadium • Clemson, SC	**W** 12–7	**Crawford** (6–2)	Karp (7–4)	None	5,075	35–12	18–8
May 7	#16 Florida State	10	Doug Kingsmore Stadium • Clemson, SC	**W** 5–4	**Spiers** (2–2)	Grady (4–3)	None	4,655	36–12	19–8
May 9	Western Carolina*	8	Doug Kingsmore Stadium • Clemson, SC	**W** 10–8	**Marr** (5–1)	Therrian (0–4)	**Griffith** (1)	4,852	37–12	19–8
May 11	Austin Peay*	8	Doug Kingsmore Stadium • Clemson, SC	**L** 3–6	Costanzo (9–1)	**Hennessy** (4–3)	Newberg (6)	4,496	37–13	19–8
May 12	Austin Peay*	8	Doug Kingsmore Stadium • Clemson, SC	**W** 10–1	**Crawford** (7–2)	Pucheu (7–2)	**Spiers** (4)	4,646	38–13	19–8
May 13	Austin Peay*	8	Doug Kingsmore Stadium • Clemson, SC	**W** 3–2 (11)	**Marr** (6–1)	Gollert (3–3)	None	4,187	39–13	19–8
May 15	at Kennesaw State*	9	Fred Stillwell Stadium • Kennesaw, GA	**W** 7–2	**Clark** (3–0)	Kennedy (2–7)	None	1,282	40–13	19–8
May 17	at Pittsburgh	9	Cost Field • Pittsburgh, PA	**W** 16–6	**Strider** (5–1)	Pidich (5–2)	None	378	41–13	20–8
May 18	at Pittsburgh	9	Cost Field • Pittsburgh, PA	**W** 4–1	**Crawford** (8–2)	Hammer (2–5)	**Gilliam** (11)	376	42–13	21–8
May 19	at Pittsburgh	9	Cost Field • Pittsburgh, PA	**W** 5–0	**Miller** (5–1)	Gomez (2–1)	None	501	43–13	22–8

Postseason
ACC Tournament

Date	Opponent	Rank	Site/stadium	Score	Win	Loss	Save	Attendance	Overall record	Tournament Record
May 23	Notre Dame	5	Durham Bulls Athletic Park • Durham, NC	**W** 21–4 (7)	**Clark** (4–0)	Brown (2–2)	None	2,427	44–13	1–0
May 24	Miami	5	Durham Bulls Athletic Park • Durham, NC	**W** 7–1	**Miller** (6–1)	Bargfeldt (4–5)	None	3,154	45–13	2–0
May 26	#13 Florida State	5	Durham Bulls Athletic Park • Durham, NC	**L** 4–5	Van Eyk (7–0)	**Gilliam** (2–3)	None	5,478	45–14	2–1

NCAA Clemson Regional

Date	Opp Seed	Opponent	Seed	Site/stadium	Score	Win	Loss	Save	Attendance	Overall record	NCAA Clemson Regional Record
June 1	4	Morehead State	1	Doug Kingsmore Stadium • Clemson, SC	**W** 4–3 (10)	**Gilliam** (3–3)	Conway (8–4)	None	5,060	46–14	1–0
June 2	2	Vanderbilt	1	Doug Kingsmore Stadium • Clemson, SC	**L** 3–4	Raby (5–5)	**Marr** (6–2)	Day (4)	5,263	46–15	1–1
June 3	3	St. John's	1	Doug Kingsmore Stadium • Clemson, SC	**W** 9–8	**Miller** (7–1)	Belege (6–4)	None	3,837	47–15	2–1
June 3	2	Vanderbilt	1	Doug Kingsmore Stadium • Clemson, SC	**L** 6–19	Hickman (8–2)	**Strider** (5–2)	None	4,360	47–16	2–2

Note: All rankings shown are from Baseball America Poll.

=== Rankings ===
Ranking movements Legend: ██ Increase in ranking ██ Decrease in ranking
	Week																		
Poll	Pre	1	2	3	4	5	6	7	8	9	10	11	12	13	14	15	16	17	Final
Coaches'	21	21*	21*	11	9	15	12	9	8	15	10	9	6	7	5	7	7*	7*	18
Baseball America	12	11	10	10	5	12	12	8	7	14	14	10	8	9	6	7	7*	7*	19
Collegiate Baseball^	15	12	7	6	2	10	8	6	3	13	14	8	5	4	4	2	17	17	17
NCBWA†	19	16	14	13	10	16	14	9	8	16	12	8	7	7	5	5	19	19*	19

^ Collegiate Baseball ranked 40 teams in their preseason poll, but only ranked 30 teams weekly during the season.
† NCBWA ranks 30 teams in their preseason poll, but only ranks 25 teams weekly during the season.
* A new poll was not released for this week, so for comparison purposes, the previous week's ranking is inserted in this week's slot.

== 2019 ==
2019 Clemson Tigers baseball

Oxford Regional, 1–2
- Conference: Atlantic Coast Conference
- Record: 35–26 (15–15 ACC)
- Head coach: Monte Lee (4th season)
- Assistant coaches: Bradley LeCroy (12th season); Andrew See (4th season); Greg Starbuck (4th season)
- Home stadium: Doug Kingsmore Stadium

2019 Atlantic Coast Conference baseball standings
	Conf.				Overall
Team	W		L	PCT	W		L	PCT
Atlantic
No. 3 Louisville ^{x}‍‍‍^{y}	21	–	9	.700	51	–	18	.739
NC State ‍‍‍^{y}	18	–	12	.600	42	–	19	.689
No. 8 Florida State ‍‍‍^{y}	17	–	13	.567	42	–	23	.646
Clemson ‍‍‍^{y}	15	–	15	.500	35	–	26	.574
Wake Forest ‍‍‍	14	–	16	.467	31	–	26	.544
Notre Dame ‍‍‍	13	–	17	.433	24	–	30	.444
Boston College ‍‍‍	12	–	18	.400	31	–	27	.534
Coastal
No. 17 Georgia Tech ^{x}‍‍‍^{y}	19	–	11	.633	43	–	19	.694
No. 19 Miami (FL) ‍‍‍^{y}	18	–	12	.600	41	–	20	.672
No. 15 North Carolina ‍‍‡‍^{y}	17	–	13	.567	46	–	19	.708
No. 16 Duke ‍‍‍^{y}	15	–	15	.500	35	–	27	.565
Virginia ‍‍‍	14	–	16	.467	32	–	24	.571
Virginia Tech ‍‍‍	9	–	21	.300	26	–	27	.491
Pittsburgh ‍‍‍	8	–	22	.267	21	–	34	.382
x – Division champion ‡ – Tournament champion y – Invited to the NCAA tournament As of June 27, 2019; Rankings from D1Baseball

=== Personnel ===
==== Roster ====
2019 Clemson Tigers roster
**Pitchers**: 12 – Justin Wrobleski – Freshman; 19 – Brooks Crawford – Senior; 20 – Mat Clark – (redshirt) Sophomore; 22 – Sam Weatherly – Sophomore; 23 – Carson Spiers – Junior; 25 – Jackson Lindley – Freshman; 27 – Carter Raffield – Freshman; 29 – Spencer Strider – Sophomore; 30 – Davis Sharpe – Freshman; 32 – Jacob Hennessy – Junior; 36 – Sheldon Reed – (redshirt) Junior; 37 – Ryne Huggins – (redshirt) Sophomore; 39 – Travis Marr – (redshirt) Sophomore; 40 – Owen Griffith – Junior; 41 – Bo Gobin – (redshirt) Sophomore; 43 – Connor O'Rear – (redshirt) Freshman; 45 – Holt Jones – Sophomore; 46 – Keyshawn Askew – Freshman; 48 – Luke Sommerfeld – Graduate; 50 – Andrew Coker – (redshirt) Sophomore	**Catchers**: 10 – Kyle Wilkie – Junior; 31 – Adam Hackenberg – Freshman; 51 – Drew Donathan – Sophomore; **Infielders**: 4 – Grayson Byrd – (redshirt) Senior; 5 – Sam Hall – Sophomore; 8 – Logan Davidson – Junior; 9 – Jordan Greene – Graduate; 15 – James Parker – Freshman; 17 – Justin Hawkins – (redshirt) Senior; 26 – Matt Cooper – Sophomore; 35 – Chad Fairey – Freshman; 44 – Bryar Hawkins – Freshman	**Outfielders**: 1 – Kier Meredith – Sophomore; 6 – Elijah Henderson – (redshirt) Freshman; 11 – Michael Green – (redshirt) Sophomore; 13 – Bryce Teodosio – Sophomore; 16 – Bo Majkowski – Sophomore; 47 – Matthew Lumsden – Freshman

==== Coaches ====
2019 clemson tigers baseball coaching staff
- Monte Lee – Head coach – 4th season
- Bradley Lecroy – Assistant coach – 12th season
- Andrew See – Assistant coach – 4th season
- Greg Starbuck – Volunteer assistant Coach – 4th season

=== Schedule ===
Legend
	Clemson win
	Clemson loss
	Cancellation
**Bold**	Clemson team member
*	Non-Conference game
†	Make-Up Game

2019 Clemson Tigers baseball game log
Regular season
February

Date	Opponent	Rank	Site/stadium	Score	Win	Loss	Save	Attendance	Overall record	ACC record
Feb 15	South Alabama*	No. 15	Doug Kingsmore Stadium • Clemson, SC	**W** 6–2	**Clark (1–0)**	Proctor (0–1)	**Spiers (1)**	4,435	1–0	0–0
Feb 16	South Alabama*	No. 15	Doug Kingsmore Stadium • Clemson, SC	**W** 7–2	**Sharpe (1–0)**	Booker (0–1)	None	5,678	2–0	0–0
Feb 16	South Alabama*	No. 15	Doug Kingsmore Stadium • Clemson, SC	**L** 3–4	Dalton (1–0)	**Wrobleski (0–1)**	Greene (1)	5,678	2–1	0–0
Feb 18	Charlotte*	No. 15	Doug Kingsmore Stadium • Clemson, SC	**W** 7–6	**Askew (1–0)**	McGowan (1–1)	**Spiers (2)**	4,075	3–1	0–0
Feb 20	Tennessee Tech*	No. 15	Doug Kingsmore Stadium • Clemson, SC	Postponed						
Feb 23	VMI*	No. 15	Doug Kingsmore Stadium • Clemson, SC	**W** 8–6	**Clark (2–0)**	Light (0–2)	**Spiers (3)**	4,353	4–1	0–0
Feb 23	VMI*	No. 15	Doug Kingsmore Stadium • Clemson, SC	**W** 8–2	**Sharpe (2–0)**	Jewell (0–1)	None	4,353	5–1	0–0
Feb 24	VMI*	No. 15	Doug Kingsmore Stadium • Clemson, SC	**W** 11–6	**Weatherly (1–0)**	Tremblay (0–2)	None	4,098	6–1	0–0
Feb 26	East Tennessee State*	No. 15	Doug Kingsmore Stadium • Clemson, SC	**W** 14–3	**Askew (2–0)**	Stuart (1–1)	None	4,069	7–1	0–0

March

Date	Opponent	Rank	Site/stadium	Score	Win	Loss	Save	Attendance	Overall record	ACC record
Mar 1	No. 30 South Carolina*; Rivalry	No. 15	Doug Kingsmore Stadium • Clemson, SC	**L** 4–5	Sweatt (1–0)	**Crawford (0–1)**	Kerry (2)	5,933	7–2	0–0
Mar 2	vs No. 30 South Carolina*; Rivalry	No. 15	Fluor Field at the West End • Greenville, SC	**W** 11–5	**Weatherly (2–0)**	Harley (0–1)	**Jones (1)**	7,432	8–2	0–0
Mar 3	at No. 30 South Carolina*; Rivalry	No. 15	Founders Park • Columbia, SC	**L** 3–14	Morgan (2–0)	**Wrobleski (0–2)**	None	8,242	8–3	0–0
Mar 5	at Furman*	No. 20	Fluor Field at the West End • Greenville, SC	**W** 3–1	**Hennessy (1–0)**	Bertrand (0–1)	**Spiers (4)**	2,921	9–3	0–0
Mar 9	No. 4 North Carolina	No. 20	Doug Kingsmore Stadium • Clemson, SC	**W** 3–2	**Hennessy (2–0)**	Lancellotti (0–1)	None	5,668	10–3	1–0
Mar 9	No. 4 North Carolina	No. 20	Doug Kingsmore Stadium • Clemson, SC	**W** 17–3	**Clark (3–0)**	Baum (3–1)	None	5,668	11–3	2–0
Mar 10	No. 4 North Carolina	No. 20	Doug Kingsmore Stadium • Clemson, SC	**W** 5–4	**Spiers (1–0)**	Love (4–1)	None	4,565	12–3	3–0
Mar 13	No. 11 Coastal Carolina*	No. 12	Doug Kingsmore Stadium • Clemson, SC	**W** 8–5	**Griffith (1–0)**	Kobos (1–2)	**Spiers (5)**	4,851	13–3	3–0
Mar 15	Notre Dame	No. 12	Doug Kingsmore Stadium • Clemson, SC	**L** 2–9	T. Sheehan (3–1)	**Sharpe (2–1)**	None	4,301	13–4	3–1
Mar 16	Notre Dame	No. 12	Doug Kingsmore Stadium • Clemson, SC	**W** 5–1	**Clark (4–0)**	Brown (0–2)	**Jones (2)**	4,835	14–4	4–1
Mar 17	Notre Dame	No. 12	Doug Kingsmore Stadium • Clemson, SC	**L** 2–4 (10)	Boyle (1–0)	**Spiers (1–1)**	Megias (1)	4,667	14–5	4–2
Mar 19	College of Charleston*	No. 20	Doug Kingsmore Stadium • Clemson, SC	**W** 13–1	**Crawford (1–1)**	Cook (3–2)	None	4,273	15–5	4–2
Mar 20	at College of Charleston*	No. 20	CofC Baseball Stadium at Patriot's Point • Mount Pleasant, SC	**W** 4–1	**Marr (1–0)**	Williams (0–2)	**Spiers (6)**	3,815	16–5	4–2
Mar 22	at Boston College	No. 20	Brighton Field • Brighton, MA	**W** 8–1	**Sharpe (3–1)**	Metzdorf (2–2)	None	208	17–5	5–2
Mar 23	at Boston College	No. 20	Brighton Field • Brighton, MA	**W** 9–5	**Clark (5–0)**	Gill (2–3)	**Spiers (7)**	352	18–5	6–2
Mar 24	at Boston College	No. 20	Brighton Field • Brighton, MA	**L** 2–3	Pelio (3–1)	**Askew (2–1)**	Walsh (2)	535	18–6	6–3
Mar 26	at Charlotte*	No. 15	BB&T Ballpark • Charlotte, NC	**W** 8–5	**Jones (1–0)**	Bruce (0–3)	None	5,183	19–6	6–3
Mar 29	at Virginia Tech	No. 15	English Field • Blacksburg, VA	**W** 6–4	**Sharpe (4–1)**	Seymour (4–1)	**Spiers (8)**	809	20–6	7–3
Mar 30	at Virginia Tech	No. 15	English Field • Blacksburg, VA	**W** 14–1	**Clark (6–0)**	Alford (1–3)	None	1,486	21–6	8–3
Mar 31	at Virginia Tech	No. 15	English Field • Blacksburg, VA	**W** 12–9	**Jones (2–0)**	Dellinger (1–3)	None	307	22–6	9–3

April

Date	Opponent	Rank	Site/stadium	Score	Win	Loss	Save	Attendance	Overall record	ACC record
Apr 2	No. 7 Georgia*	No. 13	Doug Kingsmore Stadium • Clemson, SC	**L** 3–5	Elliot (4–1)	**Crawford (1–2)**	Schunk (10)	5,170	22–7	9–3
Apr 5	No. 16 Louisville	No. 13	Doug Kingsmore Stadium • Clemson, SC	**W** 5–1	**Sharpe (5–1)**	Detmers (5–2)	**Jones (3)**	5,474	23–7	10–3
Apr 6	No. 16 Louisville	No. 13	Doug Kingsmore Stadium • Clemson, SC	**W** 6–3	**Clark (7–0)**	Bennett (4–2)	**Spiers (9)**	5,640	24–7	11–3
Apr 7	No. 16 Louisville	No. 13	Doug Kingsmore Stadium • Clemson, SC	**L** 4–7 (11)	Kirian (2–0)	**Spiers (1–2)**	None	4,633	24–8	11–4
Apr 9	Charleston Southern*	No. 13	Doug Kingsmore Stadium • Clemson, SC	Canceled						
Apr 10	Furman*	No. 13	Doug Kingsmore Stadium • Clemson, SC	**W** 2–0	**Hennessy (3–0)**	Verbeke (0–4)	**Crawford (1)**	4,724	25–8	11–4
Apr 12	at Florida State	No. 13	Mike Martin Field at Dick Howser Stadium • Tallahassee, FL	**L** 2–6	Parrish (4–3)	**Sharpe (5–2)**	Flowers (7)	4,246	25–9	11–5
Apr 13	at Florida State	No. 13	Mike Martin Field at Dick Howser Stadium • Tallahassee, FL	**L** 2–16	Van Eyk (4–3)	**Clark (7–1)**	None	4,666	25–10	11–6
Apr 14	at Florida State	No. 13	Mike Martin Field at Dick Howser Stadium • Tallahassee, FL	**L** 4–6	Grady (6–3)	**Crawford (1–3)**	Flowers (8)	3,923	25–11	11–7
Apr 16	at No. 5 Georgia*	No. 16	Foley Field • Athens, GA	**L** 2–3 (20)	Pasqua (1–0)	**Sommerfield (0–1)**	None	3,419	25–12	11–7
Apr 19	Duke	No. 16	Doug Kingsmore Stadium • Clemson, SC	**L** 8–9	Dockman (4–1)	**Griffith (1–1)**	Girard (6)	4,552	25–13	11–8
Apr 20	Duke	No. 16	Doug Kingsmore Stadium • Clemson, SC	**L** 3–5	Carey (2–0)	**Crawford (1–4)**	None	4,906	25–14	11–9
Apr 21	Duke	No. 16	Doug Kingsmore Stadium • Clemson, SC	**L** 8–9	Davis (1–2)	**Spiers (1–3)**	None	4,333	25–15	11–10
Apr 23	Winthrop*		Doug Kingsmore Stadium • Clemson, SC	**L** 6–8	Whitaker (2–1)	**Griffith (1–2)**	Rendon (4)	4,638	25–16	11–10
Apr 24	Tennessee Tech*		Doug Kingsmore Stadium • Clemson, SC	**W** 7–4	**Lindley (1–0)**	Noel (0–1)	**Spiers (10)**	4,572	26–16	11–10
Apr 26	at No. 17 Georgia Tech		Russ Chandler Stadium • Atlanta, GA	**L** 7–8	Hughes (7–2)	**Sharpe (5–3)**	None	1,385	26–17	11–11
Apr 27	at No. 17 Georgia Tech		Russ Chandler Stadium • Atlanta, GA	**L** 8–13	Chapman (2–0)	**Spiers (1–4)**	None	2,237	26–18	11–12
Apr 28	at No. 17 Georgia Tech		Russ Chandler Stadium • Atlanta, GA	**W** 11–7	**Marr (2–0)**	Carpenter (0–1)	None	1,863	27–18	12–12

May

Date	Opponent	Rank	Site/stadium	Score	Win	Loss	Save	Attendance	Overall record	ACC record
May 4	Gardner–Webb*		Doug Kingsmore Stadium • Clemson, SC	**W** 10–2	**Sharpe (6–3)**	Campbell (2–4)	None	4,609	28–18	12–12
May 5	at Gardner–Webb*		Keeter Stadium • Shelby, NC	**L** 7–9	Mitchell (6–4)	**Hennessy (3–1)**	None	1,422	28–19	12–12
May 7	Presbyterian†*		Doug Kingsmore Stadium • Clemson, SC	**L** 7–8	Dearman (3–3)	**Sommerfield (0–2)**	Cook (2)	4,461	28–20	12–12
May 8	The Citadel*		Doug Kingsmore Stadium • Clemson, SC	**W** 17–3	**Lindley (2–0)**	Bialakis (0–6)	None	4,890	29–20	12–12
May 10	at No. 20 NC State		Doak Field • Raleigh, NC	**L** 1–6	Swiney (6–0)	**Clark (7–2)**	None	3,048	29–21	12–13
May 11	at No. 20 NC State		Doak Field • Raleigh, NC	**W** 4–3 (10)	**Spiers (2–4)**	Klyman (5–2)	None	2,929	30–21	13–13
May 12	at No. 20 NC State		Doak Field • Raleigh, NC	**L** 3–8	Cotter (5–3)	**Jones (2–1)**	None	2,704	30–22	13–14
May 14	at Coastal Carolina*		Springs Brooks Stadium • Conway, SC	**W** 14–3	**Griffith (2–2)**	McDaniels (0–3)	None	3,519	31–22	13–14
May 16	Wake Forest		Doug Kingsmore Stadium • Clemson, SC	**W** 4–3	**Clark (8–2)**	Peluse (3–8)	'Spiers (11)	4,425	32–22	14–14
May 17	Wake Forest		Doug Kingsmore Stadium • Clemson, SC	**W** 10–9	**Hennessy (4–1)**	Shuster (4–4)	None	4,544	33–22	15–14
May 18	Wake Forest		Doug Kingsmore Stadium • Clemson, SC	**L** 5–14	Cusick (7–3)	**Sharpe (6–4)**	None	4,660	33–23	15–15

Postseason
ACC Tournament

Date	Opponent	Rank	Site/stadium	Score	Win	Loss	Save	Attendance	Overall record	Tournament Record
May 21	Boston College		Durham Bulls Athletic Park • Durham, NC	**L** 5–7 (11)	Walsh (5–6)	**Spiers (2–5)**	None	2,490	33–24	0–1
May 23	No. 7 Louisville		Durham Bulls Athletic Park • Durham, NC	**W** 7–1	**Clark (9–2)**	Detmers (11–3)	None	2,577	34–24	1–1

NCAA Oxford Regional

Date	Opp Seed	Opponent	Seed	Site/stadium	Score	Win	Loss	Save	Attendance	Overall record	NCAA Oxford Regional Record
May 31	2	Illinois	3	Swayze Field • Oxford, MS	**W** 8–4	**Sharpe (7–4)**	Weber (4–3)	None	8,935	35–24	1–0
June 1	1	No. 29 Ole Miss	3	Swayze Field • Oxford, MS	**L** 1–6	Nikhazy (8–3)	**Clark (9–3)**	None	10,037	35–25	1–1
June 2	4	Jacksonville State	3	Swayze Field • Oxford, MS	**L** 2–9	Woods (7–0)	**Crawford (1–5)**	None	8,600	35–26	1–2

Note: All rankings shown are from Collegiate Baseball Poll.

=== Rankings ===
Ranking movements Legend: ██ Increase in ranking ██ Decrease in ranking — = Not ranked RV = Received votes
	Week																		
Poll	Pre	1	2	3	4	5	6	7	8	9	10	11	12	13	14	15	16	17	Final
Coaches'	19	19*		RV	20	25	RV	19	16	20	RV	RV	—						
Baseball America	14	14	14	21	18	25	24	21	17	23	—								
Collegiate Baseball^	15	15	15	20	12	20	15	13	13	16	—								
NCBWA†	17	17	16	24	21	25	24	20	17	21	RV	—		RV	RV	RV	RV	RV	RV
D1Baseball	24	24	23	—	24	—		23	16	24	—								

^ Collegiate Baseball ranked 40 teams in their preseason poll, but only ranked 30 teams weekly during the season.
† NCBWA ranks 30 teams in their preseason poll, but only ranks 25 teams weekly during the season.
* A new poll was not released for this week, so for comparison purposes, the previous week's ranking is inserted in this week's slot.
