= 2013 Clemson Tigers baseball team =

American college baseball season

2013 Clemson Tigers baseball

Columbia Regional, 1–2
- Conference: Atlantic Coast Conference
- Record: 40–22 (18–12 ACC)
- Head coach: Jack Leggett (20th season)
- Assistant coaches: Bradley Lecroy (6th season); Brad Chalk (1st season); Stephen Faris (1st season)
- Hitting coach: Michael Johnson (5th season)
- Pitching coach: Dan Pepicelli (4th season)
- Captains: Scott Firth; Thomas Brittle; Jon McGibbon; Marcus Curry
- Home stadium: Doug Kingsmore Stadium

2013 Atlantic Coast Conference baseball standings
	Conf.				Overall
Team	W		L	PCT	W		L	PCT
Atlantic
No. 9 Florida State ^{x}‍‍‍^{y}	20	–	10	.667	47	–	17	.734
No. 8 NC State ‍‍‍^{y}	19	–	10	.655	50	–	16	.758
No. 14 Clemson ‍‍‍^{y}	18	–	12	.600	40	–	22	.645
Maryland ‍‍‍	11	–	19	.367	30	–	25	.545
Wake Forest ‍‍‍	9	–	20	.310	28	–	27	.509
Boston College ‍‍‍	4	–	25	.138	12	–	40	.231
Coastal
No. 2 North Carolina ^{x}‍‍‡‍^{y}	21	–	7	.750	59	–	12	.831
No. 7 Virginia ‍‍‍^{y}	22	–	8	.733	50	–	12	.806
Virginia Tech ‍‍‍^{y}	15	–	14	.517	40	–	22	.645
Georgia Tech ‍‍‍^{y}	15	–	15	.500	37	–	27	.578
Miami (FL) ‍‍‍^{y}	14	–	16	.467	37	–	25	.597
Duke ‍‍‍	9	–	21	.300	26	–	29	.473
x – Division champion ‡ – Tournament champion y – Invited to the NCAA tournament As of June 30, 2013; Rankings from Collegiate Baseball

The 2013 Clemson Tigers baseball team was the varsity intercollegiate baseball team representing Clemson University in the 2013 NCAA Division I baseball season. The Tigers competed in the Atlantic Coast Conference (ACC) and were led by twentieth-year head coach Jack Leggett. Clemson played its home games at Doug Kingsmore Stadium in Clemson, South Carolina.

== Season ==
=== Preseason ===
Clemson announced its 2013 baseball schedule in November 2012. Clemson's non-conference schedule included two series against SEC teams– a three-game weekend rivalry series against South Carolina and a two-game midweek series against Georgia. Also in non-conference play, it included weekend series against William & Mary, Wright State, and Georgia Southern, along with midweek games against other mid-major programs. In ACC play, it included home series against Virginia, Duke, Wake Forest, Georgia Tech, and Maryland, and road series against NC State, North Carolina, Boston College, Miami (FL), and Florida State.

After having many players from the 2012 team turn professional, graduate, or transfer, 19 first-year players joined Clemson for the 2013 season. Clemson's recruiting class was ranked fifth in Division I baseball and first in the ACC. It included 16 high school players, two junior college transfers, and one Division I transfer. Three players in the recruiting class– Tyler Krieger, Kevin Bradley, and Clate Schmidt– were selected in the 2012 Major League Baseball draft but chose to attend college.

Two Clemson players received individual accolades prior to the start of the season. Junior infielder Steve Wilkerson was named to both the Collegiate Baseball Preseason All-America Third Team and the College Baseball Insider Preseason All-America Honorable Mention Team. Senior pitcher Scott Firth was named to the National Collegiate Baseball Writers Association (NCBWA) Stopper of the Year Award Watchlist.

Firth, senior outfielder Thomas Brittle, junior first baseman Jon McGibbon, and senior bullpen catcher Marcus Curry were named Clemson's captains for the season.

At the January American Baseball Coaches Association Convention and throughout the season, head coach Jack Leggett received media attention for his support of proposals to adopt a new baseball for NCAA play. Such a baseball would be modeled after the ball used in minor league baseball; it would have flat seams and a harder core that would allow it to travel farther off the bat. Leggett and other head coaches supported the new baseball in response to the drop in offense following the adoption of BBCOR bats in the 2011 season.

In the preseason ACC coaches' poll, released in late January, Clemson was picked to finish third in the six-team Atlantic Division. The team received one first-place vote. NC State was picked to finish first in the Atlantic Division and to win the ACC. The Tigers began the preseason on the fringe of the national rankings, #27 in the Collegiate Baseball poll, #28 in the NCBWA poll, and unranked in the Coaches' Poll and the Baseball America poll.

In early February, the team's regular season television schedule was announced. Ten games were planned to be televised on one of ESPNU, CSS, and RSN. 35 additional games were planned to be webcast on ESPN 3 or Clemson's athletic website.

=== February ===
Clemson's opening weekend rotation consisted of sophomore Daniel Gossett, sophomore Patrick Andrews, and senior Scott Firth. Its opening day lineup was as follows: senior center fielder Thomas Brittle, sophomore left fielder Tyler Slaton, junior second baseman Steve Wilkerson, junior designated hitter Shane Kennedy, junior first baseman Jon McGibbon, sophomore third baseman Jay Baum, freshman right fielder Steve Duggar, freshman shortstop Tyler Krieger, and sophomore catcher Garrett Boulware.

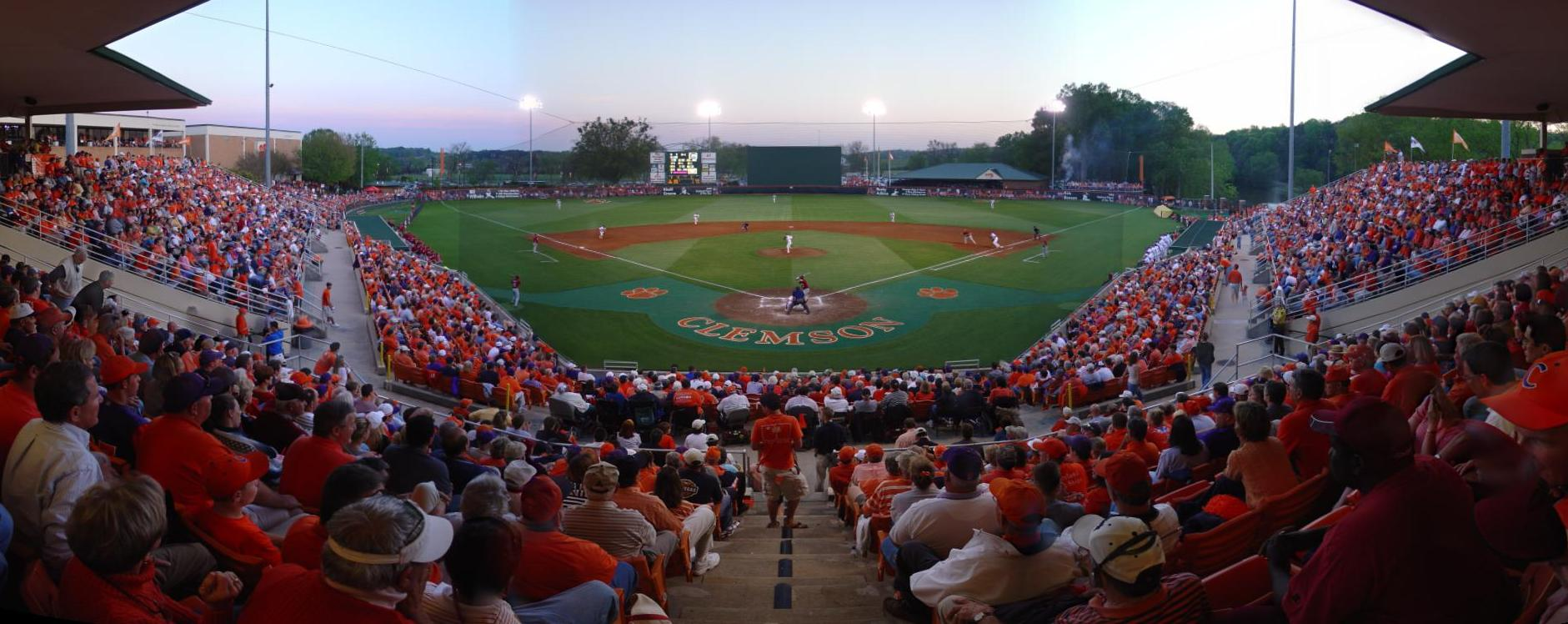
Doug Kingsmore Stadium, the program's home field, in 2005.

On opening weekend, Clemson won two of three games at home against William & Mary. In Friday's opening day game on February 15, Clemson won, 2–0, as a result of Kennedy's two-run home run in the bottom of the eighth. On Saturday, Clemson lost, 11–2, when starter Andrews gave up four earned runs in three innings. Relievers Matthew Crownover, Mike Kent, and Brody Koerner each gave up multiple runs, as well. Clemson won the series with a 12–2 win on Sunday. The Tigers scored all 12 runs after the fifth inning, and Firth was credited with a win in his first start since 2011.

In the second weekend of the season, Clemson swept a three-game home series against Wright State. After the series's Friday game was postponed due to rain, Clemson swept a Saturday doubleheader, 5–3 and 6–0. In the first game, Wilkerson homered and Matt Campbell was credited with his second save of the season. In the second, Clate Schmidt, who had replaced Andrews in the rotation, threw four scoreless innings. On Sunday, in the series's final game, Firth pitched eight scoreless innings, and Clemson won, 7–0. With the 6–0 and 7–0 wins, Clemson recorded back-to-back shutouts for the first time since shutting out Presbyterian and USC Upstate on consecutive days in 2009.

Clemson's final game of the month came against Winthrop on February 27. Crownover started the game to become Clemson's first left-handed starting pitcher in 101 games. Winthrop won the game, 3–2 in 11 innings, scoring the go-ahead run on a Clay Altman sacrifice fly in the top of the 11th. The Tigers finished the month with a 5–2 record.

=== March ===
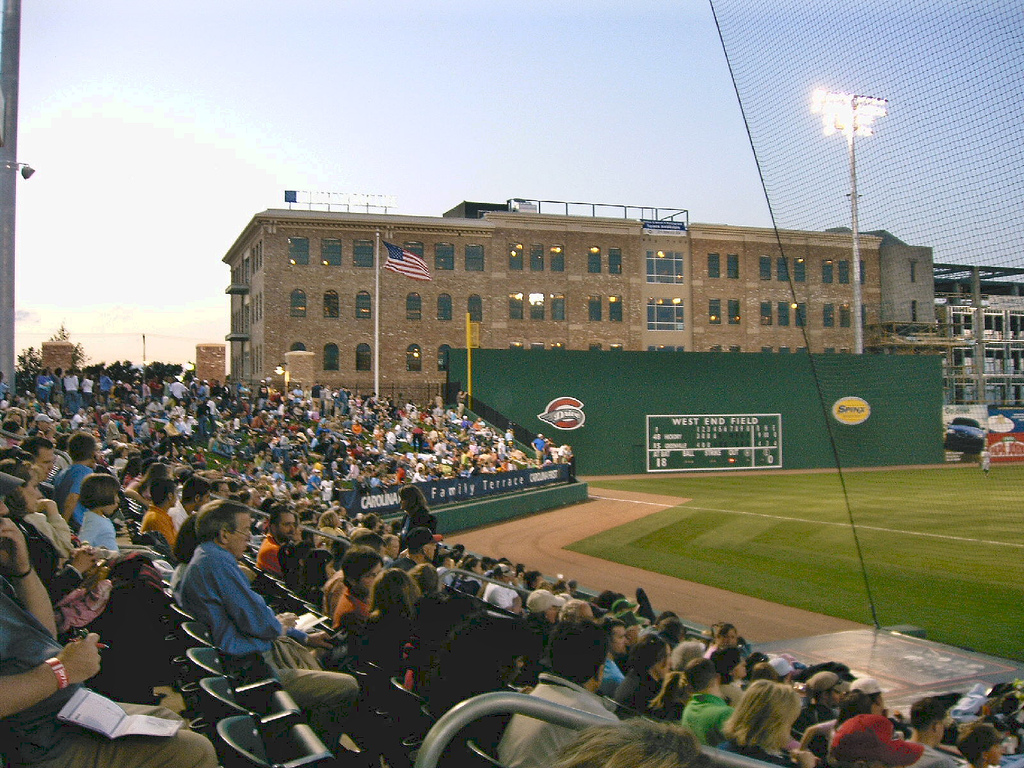
Fluor Field at the West End, site of game two of the March series against South Carolina.

Clemson's first three games of March were a rivalry series against #7 South Carolina. Entering the series, Clemson held a 169–129–2 lead in the all-time series. South Carolina entered with an 18–7 record in the previous five seasons. In 2012, Baseball America writer Aaron Fitt called the two teams' rivalry "far and away the most compelling rivalry college baseball has to offer." In addition to Clate Schmidt's joining the weekend rotation, the lineup changed slightly, with freshman outfielder Maleeke Gibson appearing in more games in left field than sophomore Tyler Slaton.

In game one at Clemson home field Doug Kingsmore Stadium on Friday, March 1, South Carolina won, 6–0. South Carolina starting pitcher Jordan Montgomery pitched eight scoreless innings. Clemson had only three hits and committed three errors, including a dropped fly ball by Shane Kennedy in South Carolina's three-run seventh inning. Five of the six runs the Tigers' pitching staff allowed were unearned. The game one attendance of 6,016 spectators was Clemson's highest home attendance mark to that point in the season. Game two was played at a neutral site, Greenville, South Carolina's Fluor Field; Clemson won, 6–3, to break a three-game losing streak against South Carolina. Schmidt, in his second start, gave up two runs in seven innings to earn his second win, and Matt Campbell got his third save. Duggar had two hits and two RBI. Clemson lost the series with an 8–0 loss in Sunday's game three, played at Carolina Stadium. Similarly to Friday's loss, Clemson's offense had only three hits, and five of the six runs given up by starter Scott Firth were unearned. South Carolina starter Nolan Belcher pitched a complete game shutout. A total of 21,383 spectators attended the series's three games. In the week three polls conducted following the series, Clemson was not ranked by any of the four national polls.

Through ten games, several young pitchers performed well for the team. Neither sophomore transfer Kyle Schnell (in 6.0 innings) nor freshman Zack Erwin (in 2.1 innings) gave up a run. Freshman Matthew Crownover gave up one in his only appearance. Crownover started a midweek game on March 6, in which Clemson defeated Wofford, 9–2. Duggar had four RBI in the game, and Kennedy had three.

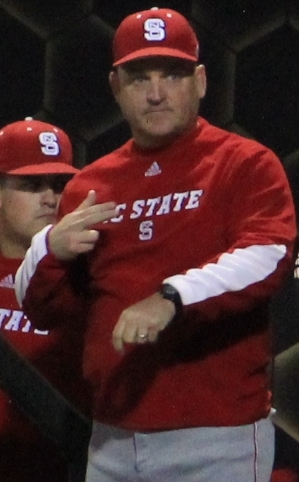
NC State head coach Elliott Avent in 2013.

In the season's fourth weekend, the team started Atlantic Coast Conference play with a three-game series at #8 NC State. Clemson won the series, two games to one. In game one, Clemson won, 10–5, against left-handed pitcher Carlos Rodon (named 2012 National Freshman of the Year by Baseball America), despite having struggled against left-handed pitching early in the season. Sophomore catcher Garrett Boulware hit two home runs in the game, while batting sixth in the lineup. Boulware had begun the season batting ninth, but because of strong performances was moved to the cleanup spot by the end of the series. In game two, Clemson won the series with a 7–4 win. Thomas Brittle second-inning grand slam gave Clemson an early lead. Starter Schmidt pitched only 3.2 innings, and senior right-hander Jonathan Meyer gave up two runs in relief. Schnell, after pitching 2.1 innings on Friday, threw 2.2 scoreless innings in the sixth, seventh, and eighth to set up Campbell's fourth save. Clemson lost game three, 4–1. Clemson's offense had ten hits, but left ten runners on base, and Firth took his second loss after giving up two runs (one earned) in 6.2 innings. After not being ranked following the South Carolina series, Clemson was ranked #26 by Collegiate Baseball following the series win over NC State. Through the end of the NC State series, Clemson's starting pitching had been strong– each of the team's three weekend starters (Gossett, Schmidt, and Firth) had an earned run average of less than 2.00.

Clemson won a March 13 midweek game against Charleston Southern, 3–1, to make Clemson's all-time record against the Buccaneers 17–0. Crownover pitched 6.0 scoreless innings to earn the win, and Schnell pitched 1.1 scoreless innings to earn his first save.

The team played its first home conference series from March 15–17 against #12 Virginia; Clemson lost the series, two games to one. Tyler Slaton returned to the starting lineup for two of the three games against Virginia, and he started and batted leadoff for much of the rest of the season. In game one, Clemson held a 5–2 lead entering the ninth inning, in part because of a three-RBI game by Kennedy. Daniel Gossett gave up only two runs in 7.0+ innings. However, Virginia tied the game with three runs in the ninth off of Campbell and Schnell, then took the lead and eventually won, 6–5, on a Mike Papi home run in the top of the eleventh. Clemson won game two, 7–6. Although Schmidt gave up five runs in four innings, Zack Erwin pitched five innings of one-hit, one-run relief to earn his first win. Boulware, who had a triple, home run, and three RBI, scored Thomas Brittle with a walk-off single in the bottom of the ninth. On Sunday, Virginia won the series with an 8–5 win. Firth gave up six runs in five innings to take his third loss of the season.

On March 19 and 20, Clemson swept Morehead State in a non-conference two-game series. The Tigers won the first game, 10–5; Boulware hit his fourth home run and had four RBI, and Mike Kent threw three scoreless innings of relief to get his first win. In game two, Clemson won, 5–2; first baseman Jon McGibbon had three RBI, and senior reliever Jonathan Meyer pitched four scoreless innings to earn his first win.

In the team's third conference series, it won two of three games at home against Duke. In game one, Gossett pitched a complete game shutout, and Clemson won, 7–0, scoring in each of the last five innings. The two teams then played a Saturday doubleheader, due to rain expected on Sunday. In both games of the doubleheader, Slaton led off and Duggar batted second in a lineup that the team used often for the remainder of the season. In the first game of the doubleheader, Clemson had an 8–4 win. Zack Erwin gave up no runs in 4.1 innings of relief pitching to get his second win. Duke won the series's final game, 13–1, after starter Firth and reliever Campbell combined to give up 11 earned runs in 3.2 innings.

On March 26 and 27, Clemson split its annual home-and-home midweek series with Georgia. Georgia entered the series having lost eight straight games. Clemson won, 9–1, in game one at Georgia's Foley Field. Duggar homered, Slaton went 4–5, and Crownover allowed one run in five innings to earn his third win. The Tigers lost game two, 5–3, at Doug Kingsmore Stadium. Georgia scored two runs in the first off of freshman starter Brody Koerner (in his second start of the season) and led for the entire game. The Bulldogs hit three home runs in the game.

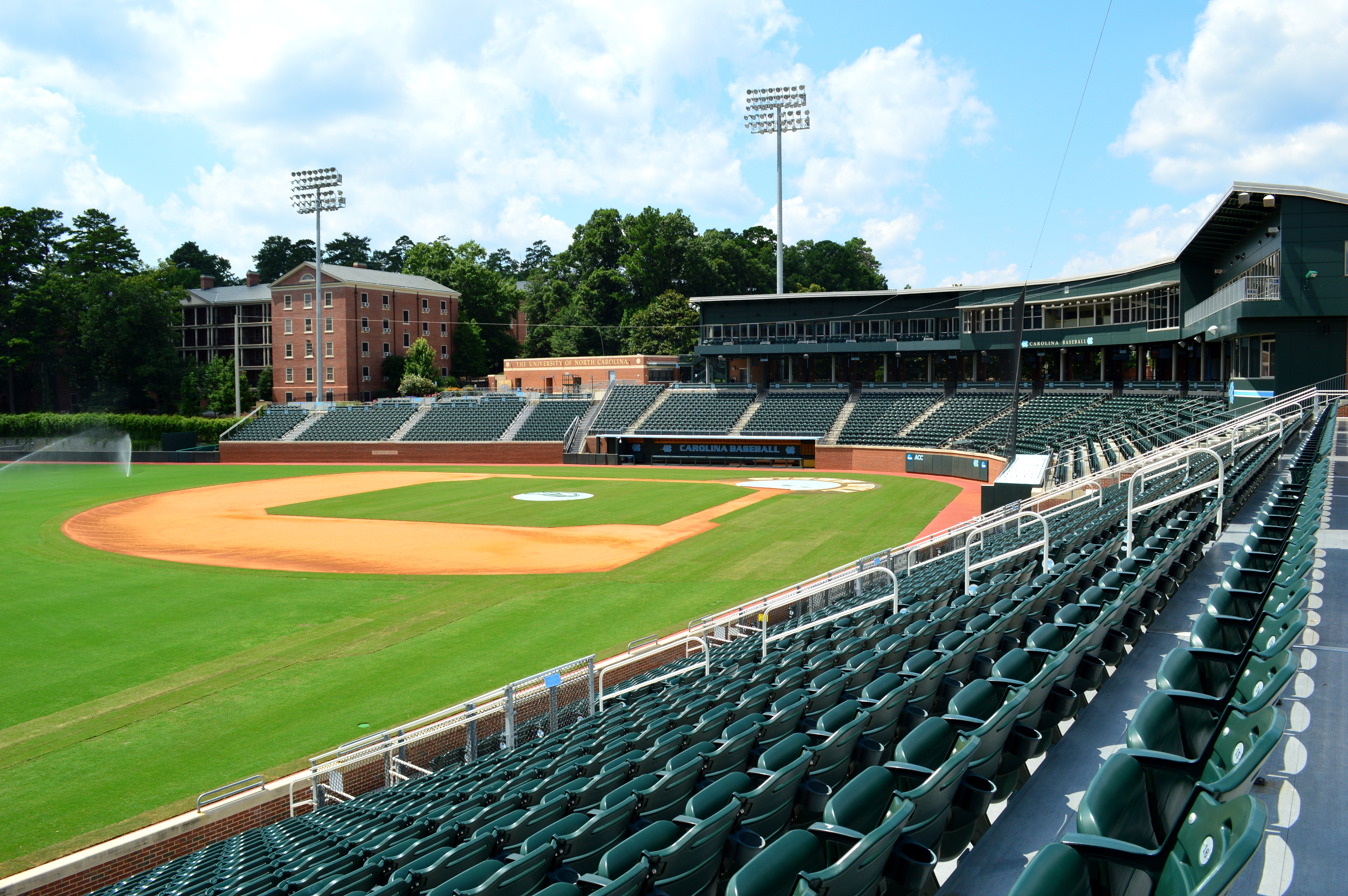
Boshamer Stadium, home venue of North Carolina.

From March 30 – April 1, the team played a conference road series against #1 North Carolina, who entered the series with a 23–1 record; Clemson lost two of three games in the series. In game one, Gossett allowed eight runs in three innings, and Clemson lost, 10–3. Clemson lost again in game two, 6–2, in a game that was started on Sunday evening, delayed by rain, and completed on Monday afternoon. In Monday night's game three, televised on ESPNU, Clemson won, 5–4 in 11 innings. Crownover, in his first conference start, gave up three runs in 4.2 innings. Losing 3–1 after five innings, Clemson took a 4–3 lead in the sixth after Brittle hit a two-RBI single and Tyler Krieger scored on a wild pitch. North Carolina tied the game in the seventh on a run given up by Firth but charged to Schnell. The game was still tied, 4–4, into the top of the eleventh inning, when an RBI groundout by Boulware scored Jay Baum. North Carolina got two runners on base in the eleventh, but Firth, who had been taken out of the starting rotation after a poor start against Duke, retired the Tar Heels to win the game.

At the end of the North Carolina series, Clemson was 17–11 (6–6 ACC), after going 11–9 in March and splitting the two games completed on April 1.

=== April ===
In an April 3 midweek game against Gardner-Webb, Meyer started his first game of the season. He went 7.0 innings and gave up one run, as Clemson won, 4–1. Boulware drove in two runs, and Campbell pitched a scoreless ninth inning for his fifth save.

From April 5–7, the team took its longest road trip of the season to play a three-game series at Boston College. Boston College entered the series without having won an ACC game, and Clemson won all three games. Gossett started game one, which Clemson won, 7–5. After being down 2–0 early in the game, Clemson scored once in the sixth and six times in the seventh to take a 7–2 lead. Gossett gave up three runs in the bottom of the seventh, but Schnell got out of the inning without giving up more runs, and Erwin pitched 1.2 scoreless innings to earn his second save. Junior designated hitter Joe Costigan, who had had only eight at-bats entering the series, drove in three runs. Clemson won game two, 9–2. Schmidt started and gave up two runs in seven innings, and Boulware and Kennedy each drove in two runs. In game three, Clemson won, 1–0. McGibbon drove in the game's only run in the sixth, and Crownover and Campbell combined to hold Boston College scoreless. Wilkerson started at designated hitter in the game, his first start since game two of the North Carolina series due to a cut on his finger. The win was Clemson's fifth consecutive.

Clemson played a pair of midweek games in the following week, travelling to Western Carolina on Tuesday, April 9 and hosting Presbyterian on Wednesday, April 10. Clemson defeated Western Carolina, 12–9. Clemson led, 9–3, entering the seventh, but Erwin and Schnell combined to give up six runs in the bottom of the seventh, four of which were unearned due to an error by Wilkerson. The Tigers retook the lead in the ninth, due to an RBI single by McGibbon, a double steal on which Krieger scored, and an RBI single by Slaton. Firth pitched a scoreless ninth inning to earn his first save. Clemson also won against Presbyterian, 5–4. The Blue Hose led, 4–3, entering the eighth, but Clemson scored a run in both the eighth and ninth to win. In the eighth, Krieger tripled and scored on a wild pitch to tie the game. In the ninth, he hit a two-out, bases-loaded single to give the team its seventh consecutive win.

== Roster ==
2013 Clemson Tigers roster
Pitchers: 15 Mike Kent – (redshirt) Junior; 19 Brody Koerner – Freshman; 20 Scott Firth – Senior; 23 Daniel Gossett – Sophomore; 28 Jonathan Meyer – Senior; 32 Clate Schmidt – Freshman; 33 Zack Erwin – Freshman; 36 Matt Campbell – Junior; 40 Kyle Schnell – Sophomore; 42 Clay Bates – (redshirt) Sophomore; 43 Patrick Andrews – Sophomore; 44 Matthew Crownover – Freshman; 50 D.J. Reader – Freshman; 51 Joseph Moorefield – (redshirt) Senior	Catchers: 25 Matt Reed – Freshman; 30 Garrett Boulware – Sophomore; Infielders: 3 Tyler Krieger – Freshman; 10 Mike Dunster – Junior; 11 Shane Kennedy – Junior; 12 Jon McGibbon – Junior; 13 Jay Baum – Sophomore; 17 Stevie Wilkerson – Junior; 29 Jackson Campana – Freshman; 37 Kevin Bradley – Freshman	Outfielders: 1 Maleeke Gibson – Freshman; 4 Thomas Brittle – (redshirt) Senior; 5 Joe Costigan – Junior; 9 Steven Duggar – Freshman; 18 Tyler Slaton – Sophomore; 35 Mike Triller – (redshirt) Freshman

== Game log ==
2013 Clemson Tigers baseball game log
Regular season
February

Date	Opponent	Site/stadium	Score	Win	Loss	Save	Attendance	Overall record	ACC record
February 15	William & Mary	Doug Kingsmore Stadium • Clemson, South Carolina	2–0	Bates (1–0)	Koehler (0–1)	Campbell (1)	5,947	1–0	0–0
February 16	William & Mary	Doug Kingsmore Stadium • Clemson, South Carolina	2–11	Farrell (1–0)	Andrews (0–1)	none	4,388	1–1	0–0
February 17	William & Mary	Doug Kingsmore Stadium • Clemson, South Carolina	12–2	Firth (1–0)	Ingram (0–1)	none	4,351	2–1	0–0
February 23	Wright State	Doug Kingsmore Stadium • Clemson, South Carolina	5–3	Gossett (1–0)	Henn (1–1)	Campbell (2)	DH	3–1	0–0
February 23	Wright State	Doug Kingsmore Stadium • Clemson, South Carolina	6–0	Schmidt (1–0)	Braun (0–1)	none	4,803	4–1	0–0
February 24	Wright State	Doug Kingsmore Stadium • Clemson, South Carolina	7–0	Firth (2–0)	Sexton (1–1)	none	5,054	5–1	0–0
February 27	Winthrop	Doug Kingsmore Stadium • Clemson, South Carolina	2–3 (11)	Ruth (1–0)	Campbell (0–1)	none	4,299	5–2	0–0

March

Date	Opponent	Site/stadium	Score	Win	Loss	Save	Attendance	Overall record	ACC record
March 1	#7 South Carolina	Doug Kingsmore Stadium • Clemson, South Carolina	0–6	Montgomery (3–0)	Gossett (1–1)	none	6,016	5–3	0–0
March 2	vs. #7 South Carolina	Fluor Field • Greenville, South Carolina	6–3	Schmidt (2–0)	Holmes (1–1)	Campbell (3)	7,125	6–3	0–0
March 3	@ #7 South Carolina	Carolina Stadium • Columbia, South Carolina	0–8	Belcher (2–1)	Firth (2–1)	none	8,242	6–4	0–0
March 6	Wofford	Doug Kingsmore Stadium • Clemson, South Carolina	9–2	Crownover (1–0)	Del Monte (0–2)	none	4,270	7–4	0–0
March 8	@ #8 NC State	Doak Field • Raleigh, North Carolina	10–5	Gossett (2–1)	Rodon (1–2)	none	1,642	8–4	1–0
March 9	@ #8 NC State	Doak Field • Raleigh, North Carolina	7–4	Schnell (1–0)	Ogburn (1–1)	Campbell (4)	1,877	9–4	2–0
March 10	@ #8 NC State	Doak Field • Raleigh, North Carolina	1–4	Sasser (1–0)	Firth (2–2)	Wilkins (2)	2,087	9–5	2–1
March 13	Charleston Southern	Doug Kingsmore Stadium • Clemson, South Carolina	3–1	Crownover (2–0)	Tomasovich (0–3)	Schnell (1)	4,244	10–5	2–1
March 15	#12 Virginia	Doug Kingsmore Stadium • Clemson, South Carolina	5–6 (11)	Crockett (2–0)	Kent (0–1)	none	4,823	10–6	2–2
March 16	#12 Virginia	Doug Kingsmore Stadium • Clemson, South Carolina	7–6	Erwin (1–0)	Kirby (1–1)	none	5,006	11–6	3–2
March 17	#12 Virginia	Doug Kingsmore Stadium • Clemson, South Carolina	5–8	Howard (3–1)	Firth (2–3)	none	4,919	11–7	3–3
March 19	Morehead State	Doug Kingsmore Stadium • Clemson, South Carolina	10–5	Kent (1–1)	Hyatt (0–1)	none	4,185	12–7	3–3
March 20	Morehead State	Doug Kingsmore Stadium • Clemson, South Carolina	5–2	Meyer (1–0)	Anderson (0–3)	Erwin (1)	4,169	13–7	3–3
March 22	Duke	Doug Kingsmore Stadium • Clemson, South Carolina	7–0	Gossett (3–1)	Swart (2–1)	none	4,157	14–7	4–3
March 23	Duke	Doug Kingsmore Stadium • Clemson, South Carolina	8–4	Erwin (2–0)	Van Orden (1–3)	none	DH	15–7	5–3
March 23	Duke	Doug Kingsmore Stadium • Clemson, South Carolina	1–13	Huber (3–2)	Firth (2–4)	none	4,304	15–8	5–4
March 26	@ Georgia	Foley Field • Athens, Georgia	9–1	Crownover (3–0)	Crumley (1–4)	none	1,484	16–8	5–4
March 27	Georgia	Doug Kingsmore Stadium • Clemson, South Carolina	3–5	Ripple (1–0)	Koerner (0–1)	Walsh (3)	5,156	16–9	5–4
March 30	@ #1 North Carolina	Boshamer Stadium • Chapel Hill, North Carolina	3–10	Emanuel (5–1)	Gossett (3–2)	none	3,945	16–10	5–5
March 31	@ #1 North Carolina	Boshamer Stadium • Chapel Hill, North Carolina	2–6	Thornton (6–0)	Schmidt (2–1)	none	1,522	16–11	5–6

April

Date	Opponent	Site/stadium	Score	Win	Loss	Save	Attendance	Overall record	ACC record
April 1	@ #1 North Carolina	Boshamer Stadium • Chapel Hill, South Carolina	5–4 (11)	Firth (3–4)	O'Brien (0–1)	none	3,205	17–11	6–6
April 3	Gardner–Webb	Doug Kingsmore Stadium • Clemson, South Carolina	4–1	Meyer (2–0)	Scarborough (1–4)	Campbell (5)	4,528	18–11	6–6
April 5	@ Boston College	Eddie Pellagrini Diamond at John Shea Field • Chestnut Hill, Massachusetts	7–5	Gossett (4–2)	Bayuk (0–1)	Erwin (2)	1,281	19–11	7–6
April 6	@ Boston College	Eddie Pellagrini Diamond at John Shea Field • Chestnut Hill, Massachusetts	9–2	Schmidt (3–1)	Stevens (0–7)	none	1,651	20–11	8–6
April 7	@ Boston College	Eddie Pellagrini Diamond at John Shea Field • Chestnut Hill, Massachusetts	1–0	Crownover (4–0)	Chin (1–7)	Campbell (6)	854	21–11	9–6
April 9	@ Western Carolina	Hennon Stadium • Cullowhee, North Carolina	12–9	Andrews (1–1)	Nadale (0–2)	Firth (1)	1,373	22–11	9–6
April 10	Presbyterian	Doug Kingsmore Stadium • Clemson, South Carolina	5–4	Campbell (1–1)	Sanders (3–2)	none	4,613	23–11	9–6
April 12	Wake Forest	Doug Kingsmore Stadium • Clemson, South Carolina	8–2	Gossett (5–2)	Pirro (3–5)	none	5,174	24–11	10–6
April 13	Wake Forest	Doug Kingsmore Stadium • Clemson, South Carolina	1–0	Crownover (5–0)	van Grouw (3–5)	Firth (2)	5,896	25–11	11–6
April 14	Wake Forest	Doug Kingsmore Stadium • Clemson, South Carolina	6–4	Firth (4–4)	Kaden (0–3)	none	4,870	26–11	12–6
April 19	@ Miami (FL)	Alex Rodriguez Park at Mark Light Field • Coral Gables, Florida	1–0	Gossett (6–2)	Diaz (3–3)	Firth (3)	2,871	27–11	13–6
April 20	@ Miami (FL)	Mark Light Field at Alex Rodriguez Park • Coral Gables, Florida	1–2	Radziewski (6–1)	Crownover (5–1)	Nedeljkovic (9)	2,588	27–12	13–7
April 21	@ Miami (FL)	Mark Light Field at Alex Rodriguez Park • Coral Gables, Florida	0–7	Suarez (3–3)	Schmidt (3–2)	none	2,793	27–13	13–8
April 24	Western Carolina	Doug Kingsmore Stadium • Clemson, South Carolina	12–1	Erwin (3–0)	Waszak (0–1)	none	4,165	28–13	13–8
April 26	#21 Georgia Tech	Doug Kingsmore Stadium • Clemson, South Carolina	11–3	Gossett (7–2)	Farmer (7–3)	none	DH	29–13	14–8
April 26	#21 Georgia Tech	Doug Kingsmore Stadium • Clemson, South Carolina	4–3 (11)	Firth (5–4)	Evans (0–2)	none	5,231	30–13	15–8
April 27	#21 Georgia Tech	Doug Kingsmore Stadium • Clemson, South Carolina	9–14	King (4–3)	Schmidt (3–3)	none	4,468	30–14	15–9

May

Date	Opponent	Site/stadium	Score	Win	Loss	Save	Attendance	Overall record	ACC record
May 4	Maryland	Doug Kingsmore Stadium • Clemson, South Carolina	2–7	Reed (6–3)	Gossett (7–3)	None	4,195	30–15	15–10
May 6	Maryland	Doug Kingsmore Stadium • Clemson, South Carolina	3–2	Erwin (4–0)	Stinnett (5–5)	Firth (4)	DH	31–15	16–10
May 6	Maryland	Doug Kingsmore Stadium • Clemson, South Carolina	9–5	Crownover (6–1)	Robinson (1–3)	Campbell (7)	4,682	32–15	17–10
May 8	vs. Furman	Fluor Field at the West End • Greenville, South Carolina	14–2	Koerner (1–1)	Dittmar (2–2)	none	4,371	33–15	17–10
May 8	vs. Furman	Fluor Field at the West End • Greenville, South Carolina	12–2	Schnell (2–0)	Smith (4–4)	none	3,410	34–15	17–10
May 10	Georgia Southern	Doug Kingsmore Stadium • Clemson, South Carolina	7–1	Gossett (8–3)	Hess (4–5)	none	4,611	35–15	17–10
May 11	Georgia Southern	Doug Kingsmore Stadium • Clemson, South Carolina	7–0	Crownover (7–1)	Richman (4–4)	none	5,347	36–15	17–10
May 12	Georgia Southern	Doug Kingsmore Stadium • Clemson, South Carolina	11–6	Erwin (5–0)	Stevenson (1–4)	none	4,689	37–15	17–10
May 14	South Carolina Upstate	Doug Kingsmore Stadium • Clemson, South Carolina	8–7	Firth (6–4)	Sobotka (0–4)	none	4,736	38–15	17–10
May 16	@ Florida State	Dick Howser Stadium • Tallahassee, Florida	8–2	Gossett (9–3)	P. Miller (6–2)	none	5,053	39–15	18–10
May 17	@ Florida State	Dick Howser Stadium • Tallahassee, Florida	1–2	Weaver (6–2)	Crownover (7–2)	Coles (9)	5,086	39–16	18–11
May 18	@ Florida State	Dick Howser Stadium • Tallahassee, Florida	1–6	Leibrandt (9–4)	Erwin (5–1)	Strode (1)	4,979	39–17	18–12

Post-season
ACC Tournament

Date	Opponent	Site/stadium	Score	Win	Loss	Save	Attendance	Overall record	ACC Tournament record
May 22	vs. NC State	Durham Bulls Athletic Park • Durham, North Carolina	3–6	Easley (5–2)	Gossett (9–4)	none	4,834	39–18	0–1
May 24	vs. North Carolina	Durham Bulls Athletic Park • Durham, North Carolina	7–12 (14)	Hovis (3–0)	Firth (6–5)	none	5,447	39–19	0–2
May 25	vs. Miami (FL)	Durham Bulls Athletic Park • Durham, North Carolina	0–7	Radziewski (9–2)	Schmidt (3–4)	none	3,206	39–20	0–3

NCAA Columbia Regional

Date	Opponent	Site/stadium	Score	Win	Loss	Save	Attendance	Overall record	NCAA tournament record
May 31	Liberty	Carolina Stadium • Columbia, South Carolina	3–8	Richardson (4–4)	Erwin (5–2)	none	5,604	39–21	0–1
June 1	Saint Louis	Carolina Stadium • Columbia, South Carolina	10–2	Gossett (10–4)	Bates (8–4)	Schnell (2)	5,485	40–21	1–1
June 2	Liberty	Carolina Stadium • Columbia, South Carolina	1–3	Lambert (8–3)	Crownover (7–3)	Perritt (10)	5,464	40–22	1–2

== Rankings ==
Ranking movements Legend: ██ Increase in ranking ██ Decrease in ranking — = Not ranked RV = Received votes
	Week																		
Poll	Pre	1	2	3	4	5	6	7	8	9	10	11	12	13	14	15	16	17	Final
Coaches'	—	—*	—	—	—	RV	RV	RV	RV	24	RV	22	22	19	18	24			25
Baseball America	—	—	—	—	—	—	—	—	22	20	25	18	19	17	18	22			—
Collegiate Baseball^	27	28	28	RV	26	—	—	—	17	12	13	14	15	14	14	17	27	27	27
NCBWA†	28	30	26	RV	RV	RV	RV	—	RV	26	29	25	25	19	20	24	28		29

^ Collegiate Baseball ranked 40 teams in their preseason poll, but only ranked 30 teams weekly during the season.
† NCBWA ranks 30 teams in their preseason poll, but only ranks 25 teams weekly during the season.
* A new poll was not released for this week, so for comparison purposes, the previous week's ranking is inserted in this week's slot.
