= 2013 Atlantic Coast Conference baseball tournament =

American college baseball tournament

- Format: 2 division round-robin and championship game
- Finals site: Durham Bulls Athletic Park; Durham, NC
- Champions: North Carolina Tar Heels (6th title)
- Winning coach: Mike Fox (2nd title)
- MVP: Cody Stubbs (North Carolina)
- Attendance: 58,454 (Total); 4,496 (Average)
- Television: ACCRSN (Round-robin); ESPN2 (Championship game)

2013 Atlantic Coast Conference baseball standings
	Conf.				Overall
Team	W		L	PCT	W		L	PCT
Atlantic
No. 9 Florida State ^{x}‍‍‍^{y}	20	–	10	.667	47	–	17	.734
No. 8 NC State ‍‍‍^{y}	19	–	10	.655	50	–	16	.758
No. 14 Clemson ‍‍‍^{y}	18	–	12	.600	40	–	22	.645
Maryland ‍‍‍	11	–	19	.367	30	–	25	.545
Wake Forest ‍‍‍	9	–	20	.310	28	–	27	.509
Boston College ‍‍‍	4	–	25	.138	12	–	40	.231
Coastal
No. 2 North Carolina ^{x}‍‍‡‍^{y}	21	–	7	.750	59	–	12	.831
No. 7 Virginia ‍‍‍^{y}	22	–	8	.733	50	–	12	.806
Virginia Tech ‍‍‍^{y}	15	–	14	.517	40	–	22	.645
Georgia Tech ‍‍‍^{y}	15	–	15	.500	37	–	27	.578
Miami (FL) ‍‍‍^{y}	14	–	16	.467	37	–	25	.597
Duke ‍‍‍	9	–	21	.300	26	–	29	.473
x – Division champion ‡ – Tournament champion y – Invited to the NCAA tournament As of June 30, 2013; Rankings from Collegiate Baseball

The 2013 Atlantic Coast Conference baseball tournament was held from May 22 through 26 at Durham Bulls Athletic Park in Durham, North Carolina. The annual tournament determines the conference champion of the Division I Atlantic Coast Conference for college baseball. Top seeded North Carolina won the tournament and received the league's automatic bid to the 2013 NCAA Division I baseball tournament. It was North Carolina's sixth ACC Tournament win. This was the last of 19 athletic championship events held by the conference in the 2012–13 academic year. This was the sixth time the ACC hosted its baseball championship in Durham.

Prior to this year, the tournament has been held every year but one since 1973, with Clemson winning nine championships, most of any team. Georgia Tech, last year's winner, has claimed eight tournament wins. Charter league members Duke and Maryland, along with recent entrants Virginia Tech and Boston College have never won the event.

== Format and seeding ==
The winner of each six team division and the top six other teams based on conference winning percentage, regardless of division, from the conference's regular season were seeded one through eight. Seeds one and two were awarded to the two division winners. The tournament used the same format adopted in the 2007 event, with the teams divided into two pools of four. Each pool will play a round-robin set of games over the first four days of the event. The teams with the best record in each pool then meet in a single championship game on Sunday, May 26. This was the final season of this format, as the tournament will expand to ten teams beginning in 2014.

Atlantic Division
Team	W	L	Pct	Seed
Florida State	20	10	.667	2
NC State	19	10	.655	4
Clemson	18	12	.600	5
Maryland	11	19	.367	
Wake Forest	9	20	.310	
Boston College	4	25	.138	

Coastal Division
Team	W	L	Pct	Seed
North Carolina	21	7	.750	1
Virginia	22	8	.733	3
Virginia Tech	15	14	.517	6
Georgia Tech	15	15	.500	7
Miami	14	16	.467	8
Duke	9	21	.300	

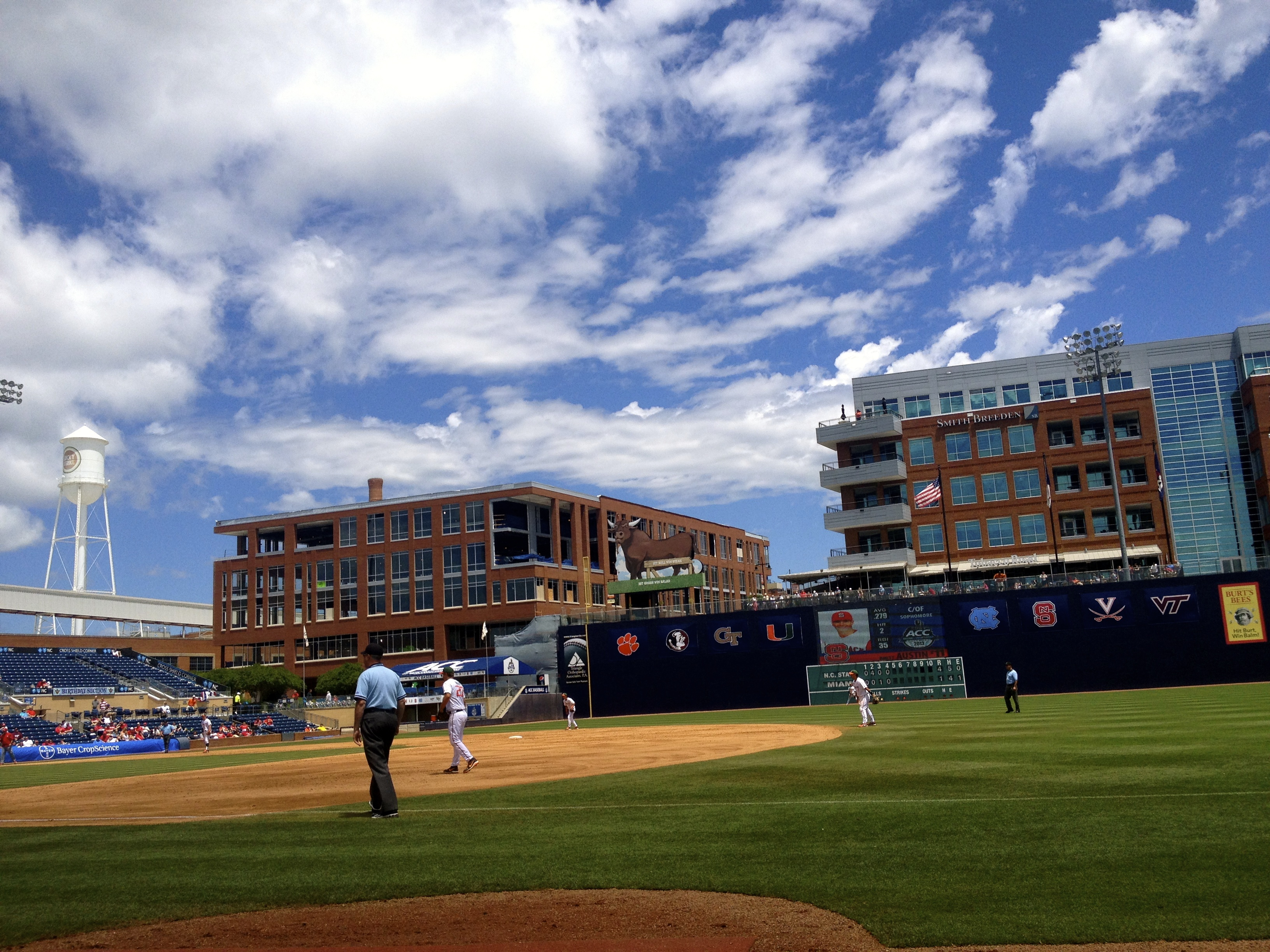
Durham Bulls Athletic Park – ACC Tournament

== Schedule and results ==
	Division A	UNC	NCSU	CLEM	UM	Overall
1	North Carolina		W 2–1†	W 12–7†	W 10–0‡	3–0
4	NC State	L 1–2†		W 6–3	W 7–1	2–1
5	Clemson	L 7–12†	L 3–6		L 0–7	0–3
8	Miami	L 0–10‡	L 1–7	W 7–0		1–2

	Division B	FSU	UVA	VT	GT	Overall
2	Florida State		L 4–7†	L 2–3	L 3–4	0–3
3	Virginia	W 7–4†		L 1–10	W 8–2	2–1
6	Virginia Tech	W 3–2	W 10–1		W 3–2	3–0
7	Georgia Tech	W 4–3	L 2–8	L 2–3		1–2

Finals
A	#6 Virginia Tech	1
B	#1 North Carolina	4

Notes
† – Denotes extra innings
‡ – Denotes game shortened due to mercy rule

== Results ==
All times shown are US EDT.

=== Division A ===
Wednesday, May 22 7:00 p.m.
Team	1	2	3	4	5	6	7	8	9	R	H	E
#5 Clemson	0	1	0	0	0	1	0	0	1	3	8	2
#4 NC State	0	1	1	0	0	0	4	0	X	6	6	0
WP: Josh Easley LP: Daniel Gossett; Home runs: CLEM: Garrett Boulware; NCSU: Grant Clyde; Attendance: 4,834; Boxscore

Thursday, May 23 3:00 p.m.
Team	1	2	3	4	5	6	7	8	9	R	H	E
#8 Miami	0	0	0	0	0	0	0	0	–	0	4	2
#1 North Carolina	3	0	2	0	0	2	2	1	–	10	18	0
WP: Kent Emanuel LP: Andrew Suarez; Home runs: UM: None; UNC: None; Attendance: 3,492; Notes: Game ended in the bottom of the eighth inning due to the Mercy rule. Boxscore

Friday, May 24 11:00 a.m.
Team	1	2	3	4	5	6	7	8	9	R	H	E
#4 NC State	0	4	0	0	1	1	0	0	1	7	11	1
#8 Miami	0	0	1	0	0	0	0	0	0	1	5	1
WP: Andrew Woeck LP: Chris Diaz; Home runs: NCSU: None; UM: None; Attendance: 3,372; Boxscore

Friday, May 24 7:00 p.m.
Team	1	2	3	4	5	6	7	8	9	10	11	12	13	14	R	H	E
#1 North Carolina	1	0	0	0	0	1	0	0	5	0	0	0	0	5	12	19	3
#5 Clemson	0	0	0	1	2	2	0	2	0	0	0	0	0	0	7	11	0
WP: Reilly Hovis LP: Scott Firth; Home runs: UNC: Brian Holberton; CLEM: None; Attendance: 5,447; Notes: Duration of Game – 5:16 longest game in tournament history Boxscore

Saturday, May 25 3:00 p.m.
Team	1	2	3	4	5	6	7	8	9	R	H	E
#8 Miami	2	1	0	0	1	0	1	1	1	7	11	1
#5 Clemson	0	0	0	0	0	0	0	0	0	0	4	3
WP: Bryan Radziewski LP: Clate Schmidt; Home runs: UM: None; CLEM: None; Attendance: 3,206; Boxscore

Saturday, May 25 7:00 p.m.
Team	1	2	3	4	5	6	7	8	9	10	11	12	13	14	15	16	17	18	R	H	E
#1 North Carolina	0	0	0	0	0	0	0	1	0	0	0	0	0	0	0	0	0	1	2	6	1
#4 NC State	0	0	0	0	0	1	0	0	0	0	0	0	0	0	0	0	0	0	1	10	3
WP: Chris Munnelly LP: Chris Overman; Home runs: NCSU: None; UNC: None; Attendance: 11,392; Notes: North Carolina advances to championship game. Duration of Game – 6:03; Attendance set a record for highest in tournament history. Boxscore

=== Division B ===
Wednesday, May 22 11:00 a.m.
Team	1	2	3	4	5	6	7	8	9	R	H	E
#7 Georgia Tech	0	0	0	2	0	0	0	0	2	4	9	0
#2 Florida State	0	0	0	0	0	2	0	1	0	3	6	0
WP: Daniel Palka LP: Robby Coles; Home runs: GT: A. J. Murray, Mott Hyde; FSU: None; Attendance: 2,742; Boxscore

Wednesday, May 22 3:00 p.m.
Team	1	2	3	4	5	6	7	8	9	R	H	E
#6 Virginia Tech	0	6	0	0	0	4	0	0	0	10	13	1
#3 Virginia	0	1	0	0	0	0	0	0	0	1	7	2
WP: Joe Mantiply LP: Brandon Waddell; Home runs: VT: Chad Pinder (2); UVA: None; Attendance: 2,455; Boxscore

Thursday, May 23 11:00 a.m.
Team	1	2	3	4	5	6	7	8	9	R	H	E
#3 Virginia	0	0	2	2	0	3	1	0	0	8	9	0
#7 Georgia Tech	1	0	0	1	0	0	0	0	0	2	10	2
WP: Scott Silverstein LP: Dusty Isaacs; Home runs: UVA: Nick Howard, Kenny Towns, Brandon Downes; GT: None; Attendance: 2,998; Boxscore

Thursday, May 23 7:00 p.m.
Team	1	2	3	4	5	6	7	8	9	R	H	E
#2 Florida State	0	0	0	0	0	0	0	0	2	2	7	0
#6 Virginia Tech	0	0	0	0	0	0	2	0	1	3	8	0
WP: Clark Labitan LP: Gage Smith; Home runs: FSU: None; VT: Mark Zagunis; Attendance: 3,020; Boxscore

Friday, May 24 3:00 p.m.
Team	1	2	3	4	5	6	7	8	9	R	H	E
#7 Georgia Tech	0	0	1	0	1	0	0	0	0	2	7	0
#6 Virginia Tech	0	0	0	1	1	0	1	0	X	3	10	1
WP: Devin Burke LP: Jonathan King Sv: Clark Labitan; Home runs: GT: None; VT: Chad Pinder; Attendance: 3,129; Notes: Virginia Tech advances to championship game Boxscore

Saturday, May 25 11:00 a.m.
Team	1	2	3	4	5	6	7	8	9	10	11	12	R	H	E
#2 Florida State	0	0	1	0	0	3	0	0	0	0	0	0	4	8	3
#3 Virginia	0	0	1	0	0	2	0	1	0	0	0	3	7	13	0
WP: Nick Howard LP: Jameis Winston; Home runs: FSU: None; UVA: Joe McCarthy, Kenny Towns; Attendance: 3,670; Boxscore

=== Championship final ===
Sunday, May 26 1:00 p.m.
Team	1	2	3	4	5	6	7	8	9	R	H	E
#6 Virginia Tech	0	0	0	0	0	1	0	0	0	1	6	4
#1 North Carolina	1	0	1	0	0	0	0	2	X	4	6	2
WP: Taylore Cherry LP: Eddie Campbell Sv: Trevor Kelley; Home runs: UNC: None; VT: None; Attendance: 8,697; Notes: North Carolina wins the ACC Championship and receives an automatic bid to the NCAA tournament

== All-Tournament Team ==
The following players were named to the All-Tournament Team.

Position	Player	School
C	Garrett Boulware	Clemson
1B	Cody Stubbs	North Carolina
2B	Reed Gragnani	Virginia
3B	Sam Dove	Georgia Tech
SS	Chad Pinder	Virginia Tech
OF	D. J. Stewart	Florida State
OF	Chaz Frank	North Carolina
OF	Bryan Adametz	NC State
DH/UT	Mark Zagunis	Virginia Tech
P	Carlos Rodon	NC State
P	Kent Emanuel	North Carolina

=== Most Valuable Player ===
Cody Stubbs was named Tournament Most Valuable Player. Stubbs was a first baseman for North Carolina.
