= 2013 NC State Wolfpack baseball team =

American college baseball season

2013 NC State Wolfpack baseball

Raleigh Super Regional Champions

College World Series, L, North Carolina 0–7
- Conference: Atlantic Coast Conference
- Record: 50–16 (19–10 ACC)
- Head coach: Elliott Avent (17th season)
- Assistant coaches: Tom Holliday (7th season); Chris Hart (9th season); Brian Ward (6th season)
- Home stadium: Doak Field

2013 Atlantic Coast Conference baseball standings
	Conf.				Overall
Team	W		L	PCT	W		L	PCT
Atlantic
No. 9 Florida State ^{x}‍‍‍^{y}	20	–	10	.667	47	–	17	.734
No. 8 NC State ‍‍‍^{y}	19	–	10	.655	50	–	16	.758
No. 14 Clemson ‍‍‍^{y}	18	–	12	.600	40	–	22	.645
Maryland ‍‍‍	11	–	19	.367	30	–	25	.545
Wake Forest ‍‍‍	9	–	20	.310	28	–	27	.509
Boston College ‍‍‍	4	–	25	.138	12	–	40	.231
Coastal
No. 2 North Carolina ^{x}‍‍‡‍^{y}	21	–	7	.750	59	–	12	.831
No. 7 Virginia ‍‍‍^{y}	22	–	8	.733	50	–	12	.806
Virginia Tech ‍‍‍^{y}	15	–	14	.517	40	–	22	.645
Georgia Tech ‍‍‍^{y}	15	–	15	.500	37	–	27	.578
Miami (FL) ‍‍‍^{y}	14	–	16	.467	37	–	25	.597
Duke ‍‍‍	9	–	21	.300	26	–	29	.473
x – Division champion ‡ – Tournament champion y – Invited to the NCAA tournament As of June 30, 2013; Rankings from Collegiate Baseball

The 2013 NC State Wolfpack baseball team represented North Carolina State University in the 2013 NCAA Division I baseball season. The Wolfpack was coached by Elliott Avent, in his seventeenth season, and played their home games at Doak Field.

The Wolfpack finished with 50 wins, the most in school history, against 16 losses overall, and 19–10 in the Atlantic Coast Conference, good for second place in the Atlantic Division. They reached the College World Series for just the second time in their history, where they finished 1–2, eliminated by rival North Carolina 7–0.

== Roster ==
2013 NC State Wolfpack roster
Pitchers: 42 Grant Sasser - Senior; 31 Ryan Wilkins - Senior; 10 Ethan Ogburn - Senior; 13 Andrew Woeck - Senior; 14 Logan Jernigan - Junior; 16 Carlos Rodon - Junior; 17 Jon Olczak - Sophomore; 25 Karl Keglovits - Sophomore; 26 Brad Stone - Sophomore; 27 Chris Williams - Junior; 33 Johnny Piedmonte - Sophomore; 34 Cody Beckman - Freshman; 35 Cory Wilder - Freshman; 38 D. J. Thomas - Senior; 39 Travis Orwig - Junior; 41 Joe O'Donnell - Freshman; 47 Brian Donovan - Sophomore; 51 Will Gilbert - Sophomore	Catchers: 18 Kyle Cavanaugh - Freshman; 28 John Mangum - Sophomore; 31 Luke Voiron - Junior; 32 CJ Davis - Freshman; Infielders: 1 Markel Jones - Freshman; 6 Logan Ratledge - Junior; 8 Trea Turner - Junior; 11 Andrew Knizner - Freshman; 12 Preston Palmeiro - Freshman; 23 Jake Armstrong - Junior	Outfielders: 2 Bubby Riley - Junior; 11 Brett Austin - Junior; 15 Bryan Adametz - Senior; 19 Will Nance - Sophomore; 20 Brian Taylor - (redshirt) Sophomore; 22 Nathan Hood - Freshman; 24 Chance Shepard - Sophomore; 30 Jake Fincher - Junior; 42 Will Raynor - Freshman

== Coaches ==
2013 NC State Wolfpack coaching staff
- 9 Elliott Avent – Head coach
- 50 Tom Holliday - Associate head coach
- 21 Chris Hart - Assistant Coach
- 5 Brian Ward - Assistant Coach

== Schedule ==
2013 NC State Wolfpack baseball game log
Regular season

February
Date	Opponent	Site/stadium	Score	Win	Loss	Save	Attendance	Overall record	ACC record
Feb 15	Appalachian State	Doak Field • Raleigh, NC	3–6	Nunn (1–0)	Rodon (0–1)	Marcello (1)	2,396	0–1	–
Feb 16	Appalachian State	Doak Field • Raleigh, NC	Cancelled						
Feb 17	Appalachian State	Doak Field • Raleigh, NC	Cancelled						
Feb 19	Charlotte	Doak Field • Raleigh, NC	5–0	Ogburn (1–0)	Hamilton (0–1)	None	1,214	1–1	
Feb 21	Villanova	Doak Field • Raleigh, NC	14–3	Stone (1–0)	MacLachlan (0–1)	None	214	2–1	
Feb 23	La Salle	Doak Field • Raleigh, NC	5–0	Rodon (1–1) (Note: Carlos Rodon and Karl Keglovits combined to pitch a no-hitter.)	McLeod (0–1)	None	122	3–1	
Feb 24	Wagner	Doak Field • Raleigh, NC	18–0	Jernigan (1–0)	Casey (0–1)	None	1,240	4–1	
Feb 24	Wagner	Doak Field • Raleigh, NC	25–4	Orwig (1–0)	Adams (0–1)	None	1,795	5–1	
Feb 26	New Mexico State	Doak Field • Raleigh, NC	Postponed						
Feb 27	New Mexico State	Doak Field • Raleigh, NC	9–2	Orwig (2–0)	Collins (1–1)	None	1,343	6–1	
Feb 28	New Mexico State	Doak Field • Raleigh, NC	8–3	Woeck (1–0)	Mott (1–1)	None	1,216	7–1	

March
Date	Opponent	Site/stadium	Score	Win	Loss	Save	Attendance	Overall record	ACC record
Mar 1	UMBC	TicketReturn.com Field • Myrtle Beach, SC	5–3	Thomas (1–0)	Cohn (0–1)	Overman (1)	301	8–1	
Mar 2	Florida Atlantic	TicketReturn.com Field • Myrtle Beach, SC	2–1 (10)	Wilkins (1–0)	Alexander (1–1)	None	389	9–1	
Mar 3	Coastal Carolina	TicketReturn.com Field • Myrtle Beach, SC	5–4 (10)	Wilkins (2–0)	Connolly (0–2)	None	589	10–1	
Mar 5	@ Elon	Walter C. Latham Park • Elon, NC	12–24	Antonelli (1–0)	Tzamtis (0–1)	None	111	10–2	
Mar 6	Campbell	Doak Field • Raleigh, NC	5–2	Easley (1–0)	Mattes (3–1)	Wilkins (1)	1,991	11–2	
Mar 8	Clemson	Doak Field • Raleigh, NC	5–10	Gossett (2–1)	Rodon (1–2)	None	1,642	11–3	0–1
Mar 9	Clemson	Doak Field • Raleigh, NC	4–7	Schnell (1–0)	Ogburn (1–1)	Campbell (4)	1,877	11–4	0–2
Mar 10	Clemson	Doak Field • Raleigh, NC	4–1	Sasser (1–0)	Firth (2–2)	Wilkins (2)	2,087	12–4	1–2
Mar 12	Quinnipiac	Doak Field • Raleigh, NC	1–0	Woeck (2–0)	O'Connell (0–1)	Overman (2)	1,494	13–4	
Mar 13	Old Dominion	Doak Field • Raleigh, NC	5–0	Keglovits (1–0)	Roberts (1–1)	None	1,498	14–4	
Mar 15	@ Wake Forest	Gene Hooks Field at Wake Forest Baseball Park • Winston-Salem, NC	12–6	Rodon (2–2)	Stadler (3–2)	Easley (1)	526	15–4	2–2
Mar 16	@ Wake Forest	Gene Hooks Field at Wake Forest Baseball Park • Winston-Salem, NC	4–13	Van Grouw (2–3)	Stone (1–1)	Jones (2)	824	15–5	2–3
Mar 17	@ Wake Forest	Gene Hooks Field at Wake Forest Baseball Park • Winston-Salem, NC	5–2	Ogburn (2–1)	Pirro (3–2)	Overman (3)	514	16–5	3–3
Mar 19	UNC Greensboro	Doak Field • Raleigh, NC	5–8 (11)	Betts (1–0)	Wilkins (2–1)	Hathcock (1)	1,639	16–6	
Mar 23	@ #11 Virginia	Davenport Field • Charlottesville, VA	2–8	Young (1–0)	Woeck (2–1)	None	3,086	16–7	3–4
Mar 23	@ #11 Virginia	Davenport Field • Charlottesville, VA	3–4	Silverstein (4–0)	Ogburn (2–2)	Crockett (1)	2,841	16–8	3–5
Mar 24	@ #11 Virginia	Davenport Field • Charlottesville, VA	3–6	Young (2–0)	Easley (1–1)	None	2,446	16–9	3–6
Mar 27	@ UNC Wilmington	Brooks Field • Wilmington, NC	10–6	Easley (2–1)	Tart (2–2)	'Overman (4)	1,926	17–9	
Mar 29	Maryland	Doak Field • Raleigh, NC	3–2	Rodon (3–2)	Reed (4–2)	Sasser (1)	1,879	18–9	4–6
Mar 30	Maryland	Doak Field • Raleigh, NC	2–3	Kirkpatrick (3–3)	Easley (2–2)	Mooney (3)	1,807	18–10	4–7
Mar 31	Maryland	Doak Field • Raleigh, NC	9–4	Stone (2–1)	Robinson (0–2)	None	1,493	19–10	5–7

April
Date	Opponent	Site/stadium	Score	Win	Loss	Save	Attendance	Overall record	ACC record
Apr 2	@ East Carolina	Clark–LeClair Stadium • Greenville, NC	6–1	Wilkins (3–1)	Williams (5–2)	None		20–10	
Apr 3	Elon	Doak Field • Raleigh, NC	8–6	Sasser (2–0)	Darnell (0–1)	None	1,709	21–10	
Apr 5	Virginia Tech	Doak Field • Raleigh, NC	8–7 (14)	Easley (3–2)	Keselica (2–1)	None	2,073	22–10	5–7
Apr 6	Virginia Tech	Doak Field • Raleigh, NC	13–4	Tzamtzis (1–1)	Burke (5–2)	None	2,854	23–10	6–7
Apr 7	Virginia Tech	Doak Field • Raleigh, NC	7–3	Wilkins (4–1)	Labitan (0–2)	None	2,279	24–10	7–7
Apr 9	East Carolina	Doak Field • Raleigh, NC	6–1	Woeck (3–1)	Durazo (0–3)	Sasser (3)	2,951	25–10	8–7
Apr 13	@ Boston College	Eddie Pellagrini Diamond at John Shea Field • Chestnut Hill, MA	6–5	Thomas (2–0)	Burke (0–1)	Sasser (4)	26–10	9–7	
Apr 13	@ Boston College	Eddie Pellagrini Diamond at John Shea Field • Chestnut Hill, MA	6–2	Wilkins (5–1)	Stevens (0–8)	Overman (5)	567	27–10	10–7
Apr 14	@ Boston College	Eddie Pellagrini Diamond at John Shea Field • Chestnut Hill, MA	3–2	Woeck (4–1)	Gorman (2–4)	Sasser (5)	747	28–10	11–7
Apr 16	@ Charlotte	Robert & Mariam Hayes Stadium • Charlotte, NC	2–1	Ogburn (3–2)	Harris (1–4)	Sasser (6)	1,702	29–10	
Apr 19	@ #14 Georgia Tech	Russ Chandler Stadium • Atlanta, GA	13–4	Tzamtzis (2–1)	Farmer (7–2)	None	1,136	30–10	12–7
Apr 20	@ #14 Georgia Tech	Russ Chandler Stadium • Atlanta, GA	6–2	Rodon (4–2)	Isaacs (4–4)	None	1,914	31–10	13–7
Apr 21	@ #14 Georgia Tech	Russ Chandler Stadium • Atlanta, GA	8–7	Overman (1–0)	Evans (0–1)	None	3,965	32–10	14–7
Apr 23	Davidson	Doak Field • Raleigh, NC	4–3	Sasser (3–0)	Zeblo (1–1)	None	1,691	33–10	
Apr 26	#1 North Carolina	Doak Field • Raleigh, NC	1–7	Emanuel (9–1)	Wilkins (5–2)	None	3,048	33–11	14–8
Apr 27	#1 North Carolina	Doak Field • Raleigh, NC	7–3	Rodon (5–2)	Moss (7–1)	Orwig (1)	3,123	34–11	15–8
Apr 28	#1 North Carolina	Doak Field • Raleigh, NC	Cancelled						

May
Date	Opponent	Site/stadium	Score	Win	Loss	Save	Attendance	Overall record	ACC record
May 3	Presbyterian	Doak Field • Raleigh, NC	5–1	Ogburn (4–2)	Dees (5–5)	None	1,645	35–11	
May 4	Presbyterian	Doak Field • Raleigh, NC	8–1	Woeck (5–1)	Knox (4–5)	None	2,007	36–11	
May 5	Presbyterian	Doak Field • Raleigh, NC	12–3	Rodon (6–2)	Jeter (5–5)	None	1,629	37–11	
May 7	UNC Wilmington	Doak Field • Raleigh, NC	7–2	Orwig (3–0)	Tart (2–4)	None	2,023	38–11	
May 11	#9 Florida State	Doak Field • Raleigh, NC	3–1	Rodon (7–2)	Weaver (5–2)	Overman (6)	2,657	39–11	16–8
May 12	#9 Florida State	Doak Field • Raleigh, NC	3–12	Leibrandt (8–4)	Ogburn (4–3)	None	2,764	39–12	16–9
May 13	#9 Florida State	Doak Field • Raleigh, NC	4–8	Sitz (9–1)	Stone (2–2)	None	2,770	39–13	16–10
May 16	Duke	Jack Coombs Field • Durham, NC	5–2	Wilkins (6–2)	Huber (5–7)	Stone (1)	653	40–13	17–10
May 17	@ Duke	Jack Coombs Field • Durham, NC	7–6 (10)	Rodon (8–2)	Istler (3–6)	Sasser (7)	1,711	41–13	18–10
May 18	@ Duke	Jack Coombs Field • Durham, NC	9–1	Easley (4–2)	Matuella (4–4)	None	1,211	42–13	19–10

Postseason

ACC Tournament
Date	Opponent	Site/stadium	Score	Win	Loss	Save	Attendance	Overall record	ACCT Record
May 22	#14 (5) Clemson	Durham Bulls Athletic Park • Durham, NC	6–3	Easley (5–2)	Gossett (9–4)	None	4,834	43–13	1–0
May 24	(8) Miami (FL)	Durham Bulls Athletic Park • Durham, NC	7–1	Woeck (6–1)	Diaz (6–5)	None	3,372	44–13	2–0
May 25	#3 (1) North Carolina	Durham Bulls Athletic Park • Durham, NC	1–2 (18)	Munnelly (6–0)	Overman (1–1)	None	11,392	44–14	2–1

NCAA tournament Raleigh Regional
Date	Opponent	Site/stadium	Score	Win	Loss	Save	Attendance	Overall record	NCAAT record
May 31	(4) Binghamton	Doak Field • Raleigh, NC	4–1	Easley (6–2)	Rogalla (5–5)	None	2,784	45–14	1–0
June 1	(3) William & Mary	Doak Field • Raleigh, NC	1–0	Rodon (9–2)	Farrell (11–3)	None	3,051	46–14	2–0
June 2	(3) William & Mary	Doak Field • Raleigh, NC	9–2	Stone (3–2)	Wainman (4–4)	Sasser (8)	2,752	47–14	3–0

NCAA tournament Raleigh Super Regional
Date	Opponent	Site/stadium	Score	Win	Loss	Save	Attendance	Overall record	NCAAT record
June 8	#13 Rice	Doak Field • Raleigh, NC	4–3	Easley (7–2)	Lemond (7–2)	None	3,051	48–14	4–0
June 9	#13 Rice	Doak Field • Raleigh, NC	5–4 (17)	Ogburn (5–3)	Simms (8–4)	None	3,051	49–14	5–0

College World Series
Date	Opponent	Site/stadium	Score	Win	Loss	Save	Attendance	Overall record	CWS record
June 16	#2 (1) North Carolina	TD Ameritrade Park • Omaha, NE	8–1	Rodon (10–2)	Emanuel (11–4)	None	22,972	50–14	1–0
June 18	#6 UCLA	TD Ameritrade Park • Omaha, NE	1–2	Vander Tuig (13–4)	Jernigan (1–1)	Berg (23)	25,543	50–15	1–1
June 20	#2 (1) North Carolina	TD Ameritrade Park • Omaha, NE	0–7	Johnson (5–1)	Rodon (10–3)	None	25,742	50–16	1–2

== Ranking Movements ==
Ranking movements Legend: ██ Increase in ranking ██ Decrease in ranking — = Not ranked
	Week																		
Poll	Pre	1	2	3	4	5	6	7	8	9	10	11	12	13	14	15	16	17	Final
Coaches'	11	11*	18	14	21	18	—	25	21	16	11	10	9	9	9	8			5
Baseball America	8	10	10	9	18	16	—	—	19	15	6	5	5	5	9	7			6
Collegiate Baseball^	11	13	11	8	17	16	29	27	19	15	9	7	7	8	10	10	9	5	5
NCBWA†	9	16	16	12	18	19	27	25	20	17	13	10	9	9	10	8	7		5

^ Collegiate Baseball ranked 40 teams in their preseason poll, but only ranked 30 teams weekly during the season.
† NCBWA ranks 30 teams in their preseason poll, but only ranks 25 teams weekly during the season.
* A new poll was not released for this week, so for comparison purposes, the previous week's ranking is inserted in this week's slot.
