= 2013 North Carolina Tar Heels baseball team =

American college baseball season

2013 North Carolina Tar Heels baseball

ACC Regular season Champion ACC Tournament champion Chapel Hill Regional Champion Chapel Hill Super Regional Champion
- Conference: Atlantic Coast Conference

Ranking
- Coaches: No. 3
- CB: No. 3
- Record: 59–12 (21–7 ACC)
- Head coach: Mike Fox (15th season)
- Assistant coaches: Scott Forbes; Scott Jackson; Bryant Gaines
- Home stadium: Bryson Field at Boshamer Stadium

2013 Atlantic Coast Conference baseball standings
	Conf.				Overall
Team	W		L	PCT	W		L	PCT
Atlantic
No. 9 Florida State ^{x}‍‍‍^{y}	20	–	10	.667	47	–	17	.734
No. 8 NC State ‍‍‍^{y}	19	–	10	.655	50	–	16	.758
No. 14 Clemson ‍‍‍^{y}	18	–	12	.600	40	–	22	.645
Maryland ‍‍‍	11	–	19	.367	30	–	25	.545
Wake Forest ‍‍‍	9	–	20	.310	28	–	27	.509
Boston College ‍‍‍	4	–	25	.138	12	–	40	.231
Coastal
No. 2 North Carolina ^{x}‍‍‡‍^{y}	21	–	7	.750	59	–	12	.831
No. 7 Virginia ‍‍‍^{y}	22	–	8	.733	50	–	12	.806
Virginia Tech ‍‍‍^{y}	15	–	14	.517	40	–	22	.645
Georgia Tech ‍‍‍^{y}	15	–	15	.500	37	–	27	.578
Miami (FL) ‍‍‍^{y}	14	–	16	.467	37	–	25	.597
Duke ‍‍‍	9	–	21	.300	26	–	29	.473
x – Division champion ‡ – Tournament champion y – Invited to the NCAA tournament As of June 30, 2013; Rankings from Collegiate Baseball

The 2013 North Carolina Tar Heels baseball team represented the University of North Carolina at Chapel Hill in the 2013 NCAA Division I baseball season. It was Head Coach Mike Fox's 15th season coaching the Tar Heels. They played their home games at Bryson Field at Boshamer Stadium as members of the Atlantic Coast Conference.

The 2013 season was one of the best in school history. The Tar Heels were ranked #1 in the Baseball America poll for most of the season, and won their first ACC tournament title in six years. They made the 2013 NCAA Division I baseball tournament as the overall number-one seed, and advanced to the 2013 College World Series. It was the 10th CWS appearance in school history, and their seventh appearance since 2006.

== Current roster ==
North Carolina Tar Heels 2013 baseball roster
Players		Coaches
Pitchers: #48 – Taylore Cherry; #28 – Reilly Hovis; #44 – Trevor Kelley; #17 – Chris McCue; #32 – Mason McCullough; #39 – Benton Moss; #37 – Chris Munnelly; #46 – Luis Paula; #36 – Andrew Smith; #26 – Shane Taylor; #31 – Trent Thornton; #41 – Kent Emanuel; #34 – Peter Hendel; #29 – Hobbs Johnson; #14 – Chris O'Brien; #27 – Tate Parrish; Catchers: #43 – Korey Dunbar; #7 – Matt Roberts; #10 – Brian Holberton; #24 – Matt Rubino	Infielders: #42 – Grayson Atwood; #25 – Cody Stubbs; # 3 – Mike Zolk; #18 – Colin Moran; # 5 – Michael Russell; # 4 – Matt Campbell; #12 – Landon Lassiter; Outfielders: #20 – Skye Bolt; #16 – Zach Daly; #1 – Michael Massardo; #19 – Tom Zengel; #8 – Parks Jordan; #2 – Chaz Frank	Coaches: #30 – Mike Fox (head coach); #21 – Scott Forbes (assistant coach / pitching coach); #15 – Scott Jackson (assistant coach / recruiting coordinator); Bryant Gaines (assistant coach); Dave Arendas (director of baseball operations); Tyson Lusk (clubhouse/equipment manager)

== Schedule ==
2013 North Carolina Tar Heels baseball game log
Regular season
February

Date	Opponent	Rank	Site/stadium	Score	Win	Loss	Save	Attendance	Overall record	ACC Record
February 15	Seton Hall	1	Bryson Field at Boshamer Stadium	1–0	K. Emanuel (1–0)	J. Prosinski (0–1)	None	2,352	1–0	–
February 16	Seton Hall	1	Boshamer Stadium	Cancelled due to weather						
February 17	Seton Hall	1	Boshamer Stadium	17–2	B. Moss (1–0)	B. Gilbert (0–1)	None	672	2–0	–
February 18	Coastal Carolina	1	Boshamer Stadium	7–1	C. McCue (1–0)	T. Poole (0–1)	None	505	3–0	–
February 23	Stony Brook	1	Boshamer Stadium	11–2	K. Emanuel (2–0)	B. McNitt (0–1)	None	310	4–0	–
February 24	Stony Brook	1	Boshamer Stadium	7–1	B. Moss (2–0)	F. Vanderka (0–1)	None	840	5–0	–
February 24	Stony Brook	1	Boshamer Stadium	9–8	S. Taylor (1–0)	T. Honahan (0–1)	None	1,610	6–0	–
February 27	St. John's	1	Boshamer Stadium	18–5	T. Thornton (1–0)	A. Katz (0–1)	None	699	7–0	–

March

Date	Opponent	Rank	Site/stadium	Score	Win	Loss	Save	Attendance	Overall record	ACC Record
March 1	#12 Rice	1	Minute Maid Park	2–1	C. McCue (2–0)	Z. Lemond (0–1)	L. Paula(1)	–	8–0	–
March 2	California	1	Minute Maid Park	11–5	B. Moss (3–0)	J. Schulz (0–1)	None	–	9–0	–
March 3	#30 Texas A&M	1	Minute Maid Park	14–2(7)	C. Munnelly (1–0)	R. Pineda (1–1)	None	–	10–0	–
March 5	Davidson	1	Boshamer Stadium	10–2	T. Thornton (2–0)	N. Neitzel (0–1)	None	159	11–0	–
March 8	at Wake Forest*	1	Gene Hooks Field	4–0	K. Emanuel (3–0)	A. Stadler (3–1)	None	788	12–0	1–0
March 9	at Wake Forest*	1	Gene Hooks Field	20–6	B. Moss (4–0)	M. Pirro (3–1)	None	1,706	13–0	2–0
March 10	at Wake Forest*	1	Gene Hooks Field	6–2	C. McCue (3–0)	J. Van Grouw (1–3)	T. Kelley(1)	1,412	14–0	3–0
March 12	Gardner–Webb	1	Boshamer Stadium	12–0	T. Thornton (3–0)	C. Scarborough (1–2)	None	597	15–0	3–0
March 13	High Point	1	Boshamer Stadium	7–2	S. Taylor (2–0)	R. Retz (1–1)	None	449	16–0	3–0
March 15	#29 Miami (FL)*	1	Boshamer Stadium	1–4	C. Diaz (2–1)	K. Emanuel (3–1)	E. Nedeljkovic(2)	1,435	16–1	3–1
March 16	#29 Miami (FL)*	1	Boshamer Stadium	14–2	B. Moss (5–0)	J. Salas (2–2)	None	2,405	17–1	4–1
March 17	#29 Miami (FL)*	1	Boshamer Stadium	4–1	C. McCue (4–0)	A. Salcines (2–2)	None	1,225	18–1	5–1
March 19	Princeton	1	Boshamer Stadium	16–0	T. Thornton (4–0)	K. Link (0–2)	None	768	19–1	5–1
March 23	Boston College*	1	Boshamer Stadium	11–0	K. Emanuel (4–1)	E. Stevens (0–5)	None	285	20–1	6–1
March 23	Boston College*	1	Boshamer Stadium	5–2	B. Moss (6–0)	A. Chin (1–5)	None	317	21–1	7–1
March 24	Boston College*	1	Boshamer Stadium	Cancelled due to weather						
March 26	VCU	1	Boshamer Stadium	3–2 (10)	C. McCue (5–0)	M. Lees (1–1)	None	365	22–1	7–1
March 27	Winthrop	1	Boshamer Stadium	6–2	T. Thornton (5–0)	J. Keels (0–1)	None	506	23–1	7–1
March 30	Clemson*	1	Boshamer Stadium	10–3	K. Emanuel (5–1)	D. Gossett (3–2)	None	3,945	24–1	8–1

April

Date	Opponent	Rank	Site/stadium	Score	Win	Loss	Save	Attendance	Overall record	ACC Record
April 1	Clemson*	1	Boshamer Stadium	6–2	T. Thornton (6–0)	C. Schmidt (2–1)	None	1,522	25–1	9–1
April 1	Clemson*	1	Boshamer Stadium	4–5 (11)	S. Firth (3–4)	C. O'Brien (0–1)	None	3,205	25–2	9–2
April 3	at UNC Wilmington	1	Brooks Field	10–0	C. Munnelly (2–0)	Tart (2–3)	None	3,285	26–2	9–2
April 5	Maryland*	1	Boshamer Stadium	12–4	K. Emmanuel (6–1)	J. Reed (4–3)	None	1,976	27–2	10–2
April 6	Maryland*	1	Boshamer Stadium	5–3	T. Parrish (1–0)	B. Kirkpatrick (3–4)	None	2,945	28–2	11–2
April 7	Maryland*	1	Boshamer Stadium	8–4	T. Thornton (7–0)	J. Price (0–2)	None	4,100	29–2	12–2
April 9	at Elon	2	Latham Park	15–3	C. Munnelly (3–0)	Webb (3–1)	None	1.422	30–2	12–2
April 10	Liberty	2	Boshamer Stadium	7–5	T. Kelley (1–0)	R. Gray (0–1)	T. Parrish(1)	365	31–2	12–2
April 12	at Virginia Tech*	2	English Field	21–8	K. Emmanuel (7–1)	B. Markey (3–3)	None	2,981	32–2	13–2
April 13	at Virginia Tech*	2	English Field	9–8 (10)	T. Thornton (8–0)	C. Labitan (0–3)	None	2,811	33–2	14–2
April 14	at Virginia Tech*	2	English Field	3–0	H. Johnson (1–0)	D. Burke (5–3)	T. Parrish(2)	2,723	34–2	15–2
April 16	Coastal Carolina	1	Boshamer Stadium	5–1	C. Munnelly (4–0)	A. Kerr (2–1)	T. Thornton(2)	1,021	35–2	15–2
April 17	Elon	1	Boshamer Stadium	14–5	T. Kelley (2–0)	Baker (0–2)	None	1,095	36–2	15–2
April 19	Duke*	1	Boshamer Stadium	7–1	K. Emmanuel (8–1)	D. Van Orden (2–5)	None	2,027	37–2	16–2
April 20	Duke*	1	Boshamer Stadium	4–1	B. Moss (7–0)	T. Swart (4–3)	T. Thornton(3)	4,205	38–2	17–2
April 21	Duke*	1	Boshamer Stadium	10–1	H. Johnson (2–0)	R. Huber (5–4)	None	4,255	39–2	18–2
April 23	UNC Wilmington	–	Boshamer Stadium	8–9	Secrest (2–0)	T. Thornton (8–1)	None	1,203	39–3	18–2
April 24	Charlotte	1	Boshamer Stadium	10–2	R. Hovis (1–0)	W. Hatley (1–2)	None	1,149	40–3	18–2
April 26	at #9 NC State*	1	Doak Field	7–1	K. Emmanuel (9–1)	Wilkins (5–2)	None	3,048	41–3	19–2
April 27	at #9 NC State*	1	Doak Field	3–7	Rodon (5–2)	B. Moss (7–1)	Orwig(1)	3,123	41–4	19–3
April 28	at #9 NC State*	1	Doak Field	Cancelled due to weather						

May

Date	Opponent	Rank	Site/stadium	Score	Win	Loss	Save	Attendance	Overall record	ACC Record
May 1	The Citadel	2	Boshamer Stadium	13–0	H. Johnson (3–0)	Livingston (4–1)	None	925	42–4	19–3
May 7	James Madison	2	Boshamer Stadium	9–5	H. Johnson (4–0)	P Toohers (2–8)	T. Thornton(4)	889	43–4	19–3
May 8	James Madison	2	Boshamer Stadium	6–1 (6)	C. Munnelly (5–0)	M. Church (4–2)	None	1,208	44–4	19–3
May 10	at Georgia Tech*	2	Russ Chandler Stadium	4–5	D. Palka (1–0)	K. Emmanuel (9–2)	None	2,072	44–5	19–4
May 11	at Georgia Tech*	2	Russ Chandler Stadium	3–1	B. Moss (8–1)	D. Isaacs (4–5)	T. Thornton(5)	2,211	45–5	20–4
May 12	at Georgia Tech*	2	Russ Chandler Stadium	8–9 (11)	Z. Evans (1–2)	M. McCullough (0–1)	None	2,250	45–6	20–5
May 14	Appalachian State	4	Boshamer Stadium	2–0	R. Hovis (2–0)	Springs (2–3)	C. Munnelly(1)	2,024	46–6	20–5
May 16	#7 Virginia*	4	Boshamer Stadium	4–10	B. Waddell (4–1)	K. Emanuel (9–3)	None	3,095	46–7	20–6
May 17	#7 Virginia*	4	Boshamer Stadium	8–5	C. McGue (6–0)	K. Crockett (4–1)	T. Thornton(6)	4,100	47–7	21–6
May 18	#7 Virginia*	4	Boshamer Stadium	7–8 (11)	Rosenberger (2–0)	C. McGue (6–1)	None	4,100	47–8	21–7
May 20	#8 Florida State	4	Boshamer Stadium	4–3	T. Thornton (9–1)	J. Winston (1–1)	None	1,235	48–8	21–7

Postseason
ACC Tournament

Date	Opponent	Rank	Site/stadium	Score	Win	Loss	Save	Attendance	Tournament Record
May 23	Miami	4	Durham Bulls Athletic Park	10–0	K. Emmanuel (10–3)	A. Suarez (3–5)	None	3,492	1–0
May 24	Clemson	4	Durham Bulls Athletic Park	12–7 (14)	R. Hovis (3–0)	S. Firth (6–4)	None	5,447	2–0
May 25	N.C. State	4	Durham Bulls Athletic Park	2–1 (18)	C. Munnelly (6–0)	C. Overman (1–1)	None	11,392	3–0
May 26	Virginia Tech	4	Durham Bulls Athletic Park	4–1	T. Cherry (1–0)	E. Campbell (2–4)	T. Kelley(2)	8,697	4–0

NCAA Chapel Hill Regional

Date	Opponent	Rank	Site/stadium	Score	Win	Loss	Save	Attendance	Tournament Record
May 31	Canisius	4	Boshamer Stadium	6–3	C. McCue (7–1)	G. Cortright (8–2)	T. Thornton(7)	3,305	1–0
June 1	Towson	4	Boshamer Stadium	8–5	K. Emmanuel (11–3)	B. Gonnella (4–5)	T. Thornton(8)	4,100	2–0
June 2	Florida Atlantic	4	Boshamer Stadium	2–3	T. Kelley (2–1)	M. Sylvestri (4–2)	H. Adams (18)	4,100	2–1
June 3	Florida Atlantic	4	Boshamer Stadium	12–11 (13)	R. Hovis (4–0)	M. Sylvestri (4–3)	None	3,517	3–1

NCAA Chapel Hill Super Regional

Date	Opponent	Rank	Site/stadium	Score	Win	Loss	Save	Attendance	Tournament Record
June 8	South Carolina	4	Boshamer Stadium	6–5	T. Thornton (10–1)	T. Webb (3–3)	None	4,355	1–0
June 9	South Carolina	4	Boshamer Stadium	0–8	H. Johnson (11–3)	J. Montgomery (6–1)	None	4,365	1–1
June 11	South Carolina	4	Boshamer Stadium	5–4	T. Thornton (11–1)	A. Westmoreland (7–4)	K. Emmanuel (1)	4,100	2–1

Rankings from USA TODAY/ESPN Top 25 coaches' baseball poll. Parenthesis indicate tournament seedings.
*ACC Conference games

== Ranking movements ==
Ranking movements Legend: ██ Increase in ranking ██ Decrease in ranking
	Week																			
Poll	Pre	1	2	3	4	5	6	7	8	9	10	11	12	13	14	15	16	17	18	Final
Coaches'	4	4*	1	1	1	1	1	1	1	1	1	1	2	5	3					
Baseball America	1	1	1	1	1	1	1	1	1	1	1	1	1	3	6	5				
Collegiate Baseball^	2	1	1	1	1	1	1	1	2	1	1	2	2	2	3	3	3			
NCBWA†	1	1	1	1	1	1	1	1	1	1	1	2	2	4	6	4				

^ Collegiate Baseball ranked 40 teams in their preseason poll, but only ranked 30 teams weekly during the season.
† NCBWA ranks 30 teams in their preseason poll, but only ranks 25 teams weekly during the season.
* A new poll was not released for this week, so for comparison purposes, the previous week's ranking is inserted in this week's slot.

== See also ==
- North Carolina Tar Heels
- 2013 NCAA Division I baseball season
