= 2013 Virginia Tech Hokies baseball team =

American college baseball season

2013 Virginia Tech Hokies baseball

Blacksburg Regional, 2–2
- Conference: Atlantic Coast Conference

Ranking
- Coaches: No. 22
- Record: 40–22 (15–14 ACC)
- Head coach: Pete Hughes (7th season)
- Assistant coaches: Patrick Mason; Mike Kunigonis
- Home stadium: English Field

2013 Atlantic Coast Conference baseball standings
	Conf.				Overall
Team	W		L	PCT	W		L	PCT
Atlantic
No. 9 Florida State ^{x}‍‍‍^{y}	20	–	10	.667	47	–	17	.734
No. 8 NC State ‍‍‍^{y}	19	–	10	.655	50	–	16	.758
No. 14 Clemson ‍‍‍^{y}	18	–	12	.600	40	–	22	.645
Maryland ‍‍‍	11	–	19	.367	30	–	25	.545
Wake Forest ‍‍‍	9	–	20	.310	28	–	27	.509
Boston College ‍‍‍	4	–	25	.138	12	–	40	.231
Coastal
No. 2 North Carolina ^{x}‍‍‡‍^{y}	21	–	7	.750	59	–	12	.831
No. 7 Virginia ‍‍‍^{y}	22	–	8	.733	50	–	12	.806
Virginia Tech ‍‍‍^{y}	15	–	14	.517	40	–	22	.645
Georgia Tech ‍‍‍^{y}	15	–	15	.500	37	–	27	.578
Miami (FL) ‍‍‍^{y}	14	–	16	.467	37	–	25	.597
Duke ‍‍‍	9	–	21	.300	26	–	29	.473
x – Division champion ‡ – Tournament champion y – Invited to the NCAA tournament As of June 30, 2013; Rankings from Collegiate Baseball

The 2013 Virginia Tech Hokies baseball team represented Virginia Tech in the 2013 NCAA Division I baseball season. They played in the 2013 ACC Championship. Head Coach Pete Hughes is in his 7th year coaching the Hokies. They were coming off a 2012 season, in which they had a 34 win season. 11 of them came in the ACC. That marked the fourth straight year with over 30 wins under Pete Hughes.

== Personnel ==
2013 Virginia Tech Hokies Roster
Pitchers: 26 Eddie Campbell - Junior; 11 Luis Collazo - Freshman; 24 Ricky Hodges - Redshirt Sophomore; 12 Jake Joyce - Senior; 29 Sean Kennedy - Freshman; 7 Tyler Knight - Freshman; 3 Clark Labitan - Redshirt Senior; 14 Joe Mantiply - Senior; 35 Brad Markey - Junior; 28 Tanner McIntyre - Senior; 21 Colin O'Keefe - Junior; 13 Devin Burke- Redshirt Junior; 38 Matt Tulley - Freshman; 37 Josh Moore - Freshman	Infielders: 10 Rahiem Cooper - Freshman; 41 Matt Dauby - Freshman; 8 Alex Perez - Sophomore; 5 Chad Pinder - Junior; 16 Ryan Burns - Redshirt Freshman; 32 Gary Schneider - Redshirt Junior; Utility: 34 Brendon Hayden - Sophomore; 25 Sean Keselica - Sophomore; 15 Phil Sciretta - Freshman	Catchers: 23 Jake Conway - Sophomore; 30 Andrew Mogg - Freshman; 33 Chad Morgan - Redshirt Junior; 2 Mark Zagunis - Sophomore; Outfielders: 6 Logan Bible - Redshirt Freshman; 17 Kyle Bynum - Freshman; 22 Carson Helms - Sophomore; 27 Tyler Horan - Redshirt Junior; 18 Saige Jenco - Freshman; 20 Andrew Rash - Redshirt Senior; 4 Kyle Wernicki - Redshirt Sophomore; 40 Tim Kelly - Freshman

== Schedule ==
2013 Virginia Tech baseball game log
Regular season
February

Date	Opponent	Rank	Site/stadium	Score	Win	Loss	Save	Attendance	Overall record	ACC record
February 15	Kent State	–	Brooks Field	10–9	J. Joyce (W, 1-0)	J. Pierce (0-1)	C. Labitan(1)	351	1–0	–
February 16	Kent State	–	Brooks Field	8-1	B. Markey (1-0))	C. Wilson (0-1)	None	519	2-0	–
February 16	UNC Wilmington	–	Brooks Field	9-0	D. Burke (1-0)	J. Ramsey (0-1)	None	1,038	3-0	–
February 17	UNC Wilmington	–	Brooks Field	7-2	T. McIntyre (1-0)	T. Blaze (0-1)	J. Joyce (1)	1,002	4-0	–
February 23	Temple	24	English Field	3–7	E. Peterson (1-0)	J. Joyce (1-1)	None	251	4-1	–
February 23	Holy Cross	24	English Field	7–5	B. Hayden (1-0)	T. Mara (0-1)	C. Labitan(2)	1,063	5–1	–
February 24	Delaware	24	English Field	13–4	B. Markey (2-0)	A. Davis (0-2)	None	279	6–1	–
February 25	Delaware	24	English Field	5–3	D. Burke (2-0)	E. Buckland (1-1)	C. Labitan(3)	236	7–1	–
February 27	Radford	25	English Field	14-10	S. Keselica (1-0)	D. Nelson (1-1)	None	361	8–1	–

March

Date	Opponent	Rank	Site/stadium	Score	Win	Loss	Save	Attendance	Overall record	ACC record
March 1	Rhode Island	25	USA Complex Field	7–3	J. Joyce (2-1)	S. Furney (0-1)	None	227	9–1	–
March 1	Ohio	25	Coleman Field	8–2	E. Campbell (1-0)	J. Miller (1-2)	None	193	10–1	–
March 2	#22 Notre Dame	25	Coleman Field	0-3	A. Norton (3-0)	B. Markey (2-1)	None	477	10–2	–
March 3	Tennessee	25	Coleman Field	7–3	D. Burke (3-0)	A. Quillen (0-1)	J. Joyce(2)	376	11–2	–
March 6	William & Mary	–	English Field	Cancelled due to weather						
March 8	#14 Georgia Tech*	24	English Field	1-11	B. Farmer (3-0)	E. Campbell (1-1)	None	312	11-3	0-1
March 9	#14 Georgia Tech*	24	English Field	9-14	A. Cruz (2-0)	C. Labitan (0-1)	None	1,217	11-4	0-2
March 10	#14 Georgia Tech*	24	English Field	6-2	D. Burke (4-0)	C. Pitts (3-1)	None	1,142	12-4	1-2
March 12	at Charlotte	–	The Hayes	6-1	T. McIntyre (2-0)	J. Harris (0-1)	None	1,203	13-4	1-2
March 13	at Elon	–	Latham Park	3-4	B. Kacer (1-0)	E. Campbell (1-2)	N. Young(4)	201	13-5	1-2
March 15	at Duke*	–	Coombs Field	2-1	J. Joyce (3-1)	A. Istler (1-2)	None	157	14-5	2-2
March 16	at Duke*	–	Coombs Field	14-7	D. Burke (5-0)	D. Van Orden (1-2)	None	232	15-5	3-2
March 17	at Duke*	–	Coombs Field	6–2	J. Mantiply (1-0)	R. Huber (2-2)	None	253	16-5	4–2
March 19	Liberty	–	English Field	16-6	S. Keselica (2-0)	B. Fulghum (1-1)	None	129	17-5	4-2
March 22	at Miami (FL)*	–	Alex Rodriguez Park at Mark Light Field	9-11	C. Diaz (3-1)	B. Markey (2-2)	None	2,428	17-6	4-3
March 23	at Miami (FL)*	–	Mark Light Field	0–2	B. Radziwski (3-0)	D. Burke (5-1)	None	2,528	17-7	4-4
March 24	at Miami (FL)*	–	Mark Light Field	8–5	T. McIntyre (3-0)	A. Salcines (2-3)	None	2,576	18–7	5–4
March 26	VMI	–	English Field	0–8	T. Lighton (3-2)	C. O'Keefe (0-1)	None	158	18–8	5–4
March 29	#4 Florida State*	–	English Field	3-2	B. Markey (3-2)	B. Leibrandt (4-2)	None	1,141	19-8	6-4
March 30	#4 Florida State*	–	English Field	10–11	B. Holtmann (2-0)	E. Campbell (1-3)	R. Coles(6)	3,389	19-9	6-5
March 30	#4 Florida State*	–	English Field	8-1	J. Mantiply (2-0)	P. Miller (3-1)	C. Labitan(5)	682	20-9	7-5

April

Date	Opponent	Rank	Site/stadium	Score	Win	Loss	Save	Attendance	Overall record	ACC record
April 2	VCU	-	English Field	11-5	J. Joyce (4-1)	D. Black (0-1)	None	1,042	21-9	7-5
April 5	at #27 NC State*	-	Doak Field	7-8	J. Easley (3-2)	S. Keselica (2-1)	None	2,073	21-10	7-6
April 6	at #27 NC State*	-	Doak Field	4-13	A. Tzamtzis (2-1)	D. Burke (5-3)	None	2,854	21-11	7-7
April 7	at #27 NC State*	-	Doak Field	3-7	R. Wilkins (5-1)	C. Labitan (0-3)	None	2,279	21-12	7-8
April 9	Longwood	-	English Field	7-5	J. Joyce (5-1)	T. Burnette (3-4)	None	1,023	22-12	7-8
April 12	#2 North Carolina*	-	English Field	8-21	K. Emmanuel (7-1)	B. Markey (3-3)	None	2,981	22-13	7-9
April 13	#2 North Carolina*	-	English Field	8-9	T. Thornton (7-0)	C. Labitan (0-3)	None	2,811	22-14	7-10
April 14	#2 North Carolina*	-	English Field	0-3	H. Johnson (1-0)	D. Burke (5-3)	T. Parrish(2)	2,723	22-15	7-11
April 16	Tennessee	-	English Field	4-5	Thomas (2-0)	C. O'Keefe (0-2)	Cox(1)	2,518	22-16	7-11
April 19	at Maryland*	-	Shipley Field	9-10	K. Mooney (3-1)	C. Labitan (0-4)	None	550	22-17	7-12
April 20	at Maryland*	-	Shipley Field	11-0	J. Mantiply (3-0)	B. Kirkpatrick (3-6)	None	534	23-17	8-12
April 21	at Maryland*	-	Shipley Field	3-2	D. Burke (6-3)	J. Stinnette (4-4)	None	562	24-17	9-12
April 23	at VMI	-	Gray–Minor Stadium	9-6	J. Joyce (6-1)	C. Henkel (1-5)	B. Hayden(1)	488	25-17	9-12
April 26	#5 Virginia*	-	English Field	6-15	B. Waddell (4-1)	B. Markey (3-4)	None	3,142	25-18	9-13
April 27	#5 Virginia*	-	English Field	5-3	J. Mantiply (4-0)	S. Silverstein (7-1)	C. Labitan(6)	2,681	26-18	10-13
April 27	#5 Virginia*	-	English Field	11-6	D. Burke (7-3)	N. Howard (5-4)	None	1,161	27-18	11-13
April 30	at Radford	-	Radford Baseball Stadium	4-3	B. Hayden (2-0)	D. Nelson (5-3)	C. Labitan(7)	542	28-18	11-13

May

Date	Opponent	Rank	Site/stadium	Score	Win	Loss	Save	Attendance	Overall record	ACC record
May 3	at Boston College*	-	Shea Field	1-0	B. Markey (4-4)	N. Poore (1-3)	None	627	29-18	12-13
May 4	at Boston College*	-	Shea Field	7-5	D. Burke (8-3)	E. Stevens (0-11)	J. Joyce(3)	2,306	30-18	13-13
May 5	at Boston College*	-	Shea Field	3-5	J. Burke (1-1)	C. Labitan (0-5)	J. Gorman(2)	843	30-19	13-14
May 8	High Point	-	English Field	11-4	B. Hayden (3-0)	R, Retz (4-4)	None	341	31-19	13-14
May 11	Marist	-	English Field	7-6	D. Burke (9-3)	K. McCarthy (4-3)	C. Labitan(8)	584	32-19	13-14
May 12	Marist	-	English Field	7-6	C. Labitan (1-5)	J. Eich (1-2)	None	1,076	33-19	13-14
May 16	Wake Forest*	-	English Field	13-2	J. Mantiply (5-0)	J. Fischer (2-4)	None	962	34-19	14-14
May 17	Wake Forest*	-	English Field	5-3	J. Joyce (7-1)	N. Spezial (6-1)	C. Labitan(9)	1,420	35-19	15-14
May 18	Wake Forest*	-	English Field	Cancelled due to weather						

Post-season
ACC Tournament

Date	Opponent	Rank	Site/stadium	Score	Win	Loss	Save	Attendance	Tournament record
May 22	#6 Virginia (3)	–	Durham Bulls Athletic Park	10-1	J. Mantiply (6-0)	B. Waddell (5-2)	None	2,455	1-0
May 23	#7 Florida State (2)	–	Durham Bulls Athletic Park	3-2	C. Labitan (2-5)	G. Smith (4-1)	None	3,020	2-0
May 24	Georgia Tech (7)	–	Durham Bulls Athletic Park	3-2	D. Burke (10-3)	J. King (6-5)	C. Labitan(10)	3,129	3-0
May 26	#5 North Carolina (1)	–	Durham Bulls Athletic Park	1-4	T. Cherry (1-0)	E. Campbell (2-4)	T. Kelley (2)	8,697	3-1

NCAA Blacksburg Regional

Date	Opponent	Rank	Site/stadium	Score	Win	Loss	Save	Attendance	Tournament record
May 31	Connecticut (4)	#22	English Field	2-5	C. Cross (9–4)	J. Mantiply (6–1)	P. Butler (5)	3,566	0–1
June 1	Coastal Carolina (3)	#22	English Field	9-1	D. Burke (11-3)	B. Smith 5-4	None	1,772	1-1
June 2	Connecticut (4)	#22	English Field	3-1	B. Markey (5-4)	A. Marzi 5-7	Labitan (11)	1,203	2-1

Rankings from USA TODAY/ESPN Top 25 coaches' baseball poll. Parenthesis indicate tournament seedings.
*ACC Conference games

== See also ==
- Virginia Tech Hokies
- 2013 NCAA Division I baseball season
