= 2013 Virginia Cavaliers baseball team =

American college baseball season

2013 Virginia Cavaliers baseball

Charlottesville Regional Champion

Charlottesville Super Regional, 0–2
- Conference: Atlantic Coast Conference
- Record: 45–9 (22–8 ACC)
- Head coach: Brian O'Connor (10th season)
- Assistant coaches: Kevin McMullan (10th season); Karl Kuhn (10th season); Matt Kirby (2nd season)
- Home stadium: Davenport Field

2013 Atlantic Coast Conference baseball standings
	Conf.				Overall
Team	W		L	PCT	W		L	PCT
Atlantic
No. 9 Florida State ^{x}‍‍‍^{y}	20	–	10	.667	47	–	17	.734
No. 8 NC State ‍‍‍^{y}	19	–	10	.655	50	–	16	.758
No. 14 Clemson ‍‍‍^{y}	18	–	12	.600	40	–	22	.645
Maryland ‍‍‍	11	–	19	.367	30	–	25	.545
Wake Forest ‍‍‍	9	–	20	.310	28	–	27	.509
Boston College ‍‍‍	4	–	25	.138	12	–	40	.231
Coastal
No. 2 North Carolina ^{x}‍‍‡‍^{y}	21	–	7	.750	59	–	12	.831
No. 7 Virginia ‍‍‍^{y}	22	–	8	.733	50	–	12	.806
Virginia Tech ‍‍‍^{y}	15	–	14	.517	40	–	22	.645
Georgia Tech ‍‍‍^{y}	15	–	15	.500	37	–	27	.578
Miami (FL) ‍‍‍^{y}	14	–	16	.467	37	–	25	.597
Duke ‍‍‍	9	–	21	.300	26	–	29	.473
x – Division champion ‡ – Tournament champion y – Invited to the NCAA tournament As of June 30, 2013; Rankings from Collegiate Baseball

The 2013 Virginia Cavaliers baseball team represented the University of Virginia in the 2013 NCAA Division I baseball season. Head Coach Brian O'Connor is in his 10th year coaching the Cavaliers. They are coming off a 2012 season, in which they made it to the Charlottesville Regional in the NCAA tournament.

== Personnel ==
2013 Virginia Cavaliers Roster
Pitchers: 35 David Rosenberger – Freshman; 42 Brett Lisle – (redshirt) Freshman; 46 Nathaniel Abel – Sophomore; 19 Nathan Kirby – Freshman; 20 Brandon Waddell – Freshman; 28 Kevin Doherty – Freshman; 29 Scott Silverstein – (redshirt) Senior; 3 Kyle Crockett – Junior; 34 Artie Lewicki – Junior; 21 Barrett O'Neill – Sophomore; 27 Josh Sborz – Freshman; 22 Trey Oest – Freshman; 39 Austin Young – Junior; 15 Tyler Carrico – Freshman; 6 Cameron Tekker – Freshman; 47 Whit Mayberry – (redshirt) Junior	Infielders: 32 George Ragsdale – Freshman; 7 Branden Cogswell – Sophomore; 2 John LaPrise – Freshman; 13 Jared King- (redshirt) Senior; 37 Thomas Woodruff – Sophomore; 30 Rob Amaro – (redshirt) Junior; 9 Kenny Towns – Sophomore; Utility: 25 Reed Gragnani – (redshirt) Senior; 33 Nick Howard – Sophomore; 10 Brandon Downes – Sophomore	Catchers: 18 Nate Irving – Sophomore; 8 Robbie Coman – Freshman; 11 Scott Williams- Freshman; Outfielders: 14 Colin Harrington – (redshirt) Junior; 23 Derek Fisher – Sophomore; 31 Joe McCarthy – Freshman; 38 Mike Papi – Sophomore; 16 Rob Bennie – Freshman

== Schedule ==
2013 Virginia Cavaliers baseball game log
Regular season
February

Date	Opponent	Rank	Site/stadium	Score	Win	Loss	Save	Attendance	Overall record	ACC record
February 15	at East Carolina	25	Clark–LeClair Stadium	14–4	J. Sborz (1-0)	L. Hoffman (0-1)	None	3,511	1–0	–
February 16	at East Carolina	25	Clark-LeClair Stadium	13-9	W. Mayberry (1-0)	L. Lucroy (0-1)	None	2,483	2-0	–
February 18	Saint Peter's	25	Davenport Field	9-1	T. Oest (1-0)	Z. Hopf (0-1)	None	2,333	3-0	–
February 19	Willam & Mary	25	Davenport Field	11-2	N. Howard (1-0)	M. Wainman (0-1)	None	2,251	4-0	–
February 22	Toledo	25	Davenport Field	15–0	B. Waddell (1-0)	R. Wilkinson (0-1)	None	2,246	5-0	–
February 23	Toledo	25	Davenport Field	5–0	S. Silverstein (1-0)	K. Shaw (1-1)	W. Mayberry(1)	2,405	6–0	–
February 24	Toledo	25	Davenport Field	6–3	N. Kirby (1-0	K. Slack (0-1)	J. Sborz(1)	2,536	7–0	–
February 27	George Washington	19	Davenport Field	11-0	T. Oest(2-0)	M. Kaplow (0-2)	None	2,266	8–0	–

March

Date	Opponent	Rank	Site/stadium	Score	Win	Loss	Save	Attendance	Overall record	ACC record
March 1	Harvard	19	Davenport Field	3–0	B. Waddell (2-0)	S. Dodge (0-1)	J. Sborz(2)	2,437	9–0	–
March 2	Bucknell	19	Davenport Field	12–4	S. Silverstein (2-0)	D. Weigel (0-3)	None	2,240	10–0	–
March 2	Harvard	19	Davenport Field	11-5	W. Mayberry (2-0)	M. Timoney (0-1)	None	2,685	11–0	–
March 3	Bucknell	19	Davenport Field	9–1	N. Howard (2-0)	X. Hammond (0-2)	None	2,468	12–0	–
March 9	Maryland*	17	Davenport Field	7-6	K. Crockett (1-0)	J. Stinnett (1-1)	None	3,102	13-0	1-0
March 9	Maryland*	17	Davenport Field	5-0	S. Silverstein (3-0)	B. Kirkpatrick (2-2)	None	2,664	14-0	2-0
March 10	Maryland*	17	Davenport Field	2-4	K. Mooney (2-0)	N. Howard (2-1)	J. Stinnett(2)	3,211	14-1	2-1
March 13	Liberty	12	Davenport Field	7-2	T. Oest (3-0)	W. Martin (1-1)	None	2,364	15-1	2-1
March 15	at #26 Clemson*	12	Doug Kingsmore Stadium	6-5	K. Crockett (2-0)	M. Kent (0-1)	None	4,823	16-1	3-1
March 16	at #26 Clemson*	12	Doug Kingsmore Stadium	6-7	Z. Erwin (1-0)	N. Kirby (1-1)	None	5,006	16-2	3-2
March 17	at #26 Clemson*	12	Doug Kingsmore Stadium	8-5	N. Howard (3-1)	S. Firth (2-3)	None	4,919	17-2	4-2
March 19	Yale	15	Davenport Field	14-3	T. Oest (4-0)	B. Joseph (1-1)	None	2,327	18-2	4-2
March 20	Yale	11	Davenport Field	10-0	J. Sborz (2-0)	M. Coleman (0-2)	None	2,316	19-2	4-2
March 23	#16 NC State*	11	Davenport Field	8–2	A. Young (1-0)	A. Woek (2-1)	None	3,086	20-2	5–2
March 23	#16 NC State*	11	Davenport Field	4-3	S. Silverstein (4-0)	E. Ogburn (2-2)	K. Crockett(1)	2,841	21-2	6–2
March 24	#16 NC State*	11	Davenport Field	6–3	A. Young (2-0)	Easley (1-1)	None	2,446	22–2	7–2
March 27	Towson	5	Davenport Field	7–1	N. Kirby (2-1)	N. Nowottnick (1-1)	None	2,321	23–2	7–2
March 29	Miami (FL)*	5	Davenport Field	15-4	A. Young (3-0)	C. Diaz (3-2)	None	3,299	24-2	8-2
March 30	Miami (FL)*	5	Davenport Field	8-1	S. Silverstein (5-0)	B. Radziewski (3-1)	K. Crockett(2)	4,258	25-2	9-2
March 31	Miami (FL)*	5	Davenport Field	3–4	T. Woodrey (4-0)	N. Howard (3-2)	E. Nedeljkovic(6)	2,760	25-3	9-3

April

Date	Opponent	Rank	Site/stadium	Score	Win	Loss	Save	Attendance	Overall record	ACC record
April 2	at Liberty	4	Al Worthington Stadium	2-0	J. Sborz (3-0)	J. Richardson (0-1)	K. Crockett(3)	2,543	26-3	9-3
April 3	VMI	4	Davenport Field	8-6	T. Oest (5-0)	A. Woods (2-1)	K. Crockett(4)	2,745	27-3	9-3
April 6	at Wake Forest*	4	Gene Hooks Field	7-6	W. Mayberry (3-0)	C. Kaden (0-2)	K. Crockett(5)	1,012	28-3	10-3
April 7	at Wake Forest*	4	Gene Hooks Field	8-6	A. Young (4-0)	N. Jones (2-1)	K. Crockett(6)	977	29-3	11-3
April 8	at Wake Forest*	4	Gene Hooks Field	9-7	N. Howard (4-2)	M. Conway (1-1)	K. Crockett(7)	626	30-3	12-3
April 10	Radford	4	Davenport Field	8-9	D. Nelson (4-2)	A. Lewicki (0-1)	M. Costello(7)	2,977	30-4	12-3
April 12	at #18 Georgia Tech*	4	Russ Chandler Stadium	1-2	B. Farmer (8-1)	B. Waddell (2-2)	None	1,621	30-5	12-4
April 13	at #18 Georgia Tech*	4	Russ Chandler Stadium	7-2	S. Silverstein (7-0)	D. Isaacs (4-4)	None	1,884	31-5	13-4
April 14	at #18 Georgia Tech*	4	Russ Chandler Stadium	2-3	C. Pitts (5-3)	N. Howard (4-3)	J. King(2)	1,273	31-6	13-5
April 17	Old Dominion	9	Davenport Field	10-9	K. Crockett (3-0)	B. Gero (3-3)	None	2,797	32-6	13-5
April 19	#6 Florida State*	9	Davenport Field	9-2	B. Waddell (3-1)	L. Weaver (4-1)	None	3,930	33-6	14-5
April 20	#6 Florida State*	9	Davenport Field	2-0	S. Silverstein (7-0)	B. Leibrandt (5-4)	K. Crockett(8)	4,980	34-6	15-5
April 21	#6 Florida State*	9	Davenport Field	5-2	N. Howard (5-3)	S. Sitz (7-1)	K. Crockett(9)	4,980	35-6	16-5
April 23	Richmond	5	Davenport Field	6-2	D. Rosenberger (1-0)	C. Bates (1-3)	None	2,799	36-6	16-5
April 24	James Madison	5	Davenport Field Field	16-8	A. Young (5-0)	L. Drayer (2-3)	None	3,063	37-6	16-5
April 26	Virginia Tech*	5	English Field	15-6	B. Waddell (4-1)	B. Markey (3-4)	W. Mayberry(2)	3,142	38-6	17-5
April 27	Virginia Tech*	5	English Field	3-5	J. Mantiply (4-0)	S. Silverstein (7-1)	C. Labitan(6)	2,681	38-7	17-6
April 27	Virginia Tech*	5	English Field	6-11	D. Burke (7-3)	N. Howard (5-4)	None	1,161	38-8	17-7
April 30	at VCU	7	The Diamond	11-3	N. Kirby (3-1)	D. Black (0-2)	None	4,104	39-8	17-7

May

Date	Opponent	Rank	Site/stadium	Score	Win	Loss	Save	Attendance	Overall record	ACC record
May 10	Duke*	8	Davenport Field	6-5	N. Kirby (4-1)	Istler (3-5)	None	3,369	40-8	18-7
May 11	Duke*	8	Davenport Field	17-8	S. Silverstein (8-1)	M. Matuella (4-3)	None	4,040	41-8	19-7
May 12	Duke*	8	Davenport Field	14-6	K. Crockett (4-0)	R. Huber (5-6)	None	4,646	42-8	20-7
May 14	VCU	7	Davenport Field	17-3	W. Mayberry (4-0)	D. Black (0-3)	None	3,162	43-8	20-7
May 16	at #4 North Carolina*	7	Boshamer Stadium	10-4	B. Waddell (5-1)	K. Emanuel (9-3)	None	3,095	44-8	21-7
May 17	at #4 North Carolina*	7	Boshamer Stadium	5-8	McCue (6-0)	K. Crockett (4-1)	T. Thornton(6)	4,100	44-9	21-8
May 18	at #4 North Carolina*	7	Boshamer Stadium	8-7	Rosenberger (2-0)	McCue (6-1)	None	4,100	45-9	22-8

ACC Tournament

Date	Opponent	Rank	Site/stadium	Score	Win	Loss	Save	Attendance	Tournament record
May 22	Virginia Tech	7	Durham Bulls Athletic Park	1-10	J. Mantiply (6-0)	B. Waddell (5-2)	None	2,455	0-1
May 23	Georgia Tech	7	Durham Bulls Athletic Park	8-2	Silverstein (9-1)	Isaacs (4-7)	None	2,998	1-1
May 25	Florida State	7	Durham Bulls Athletic Park	7-4	Nick Howard	Jameis Winston	None	3,670	2-1

Charlottesville Regional

Date	Opponent	Rank	Site/stadium	Score	Win	Loss	Save	Attendance	Tournament record
May 31	(4)Army	7	Davenport Field	2-1	Waddell (6-2)	Rowley (9-4)	Crockett (11)	3,826	1-0
June 1	(3)Elon	7	Davenport Field	2-0	Silverstein (10-1)	Medick (7-7)	Crockett (12)	4,434	2-0
June 2	(3)Elon	7	Davenport Field	11-3	Rosenberger (3-0)	Young (2-2)		3,792	3-0

Charlottesville Super Regional

Date	Opponent	Rank	Site/stadium	Score	Win	Loss	Save	Attendance	Tournament record
June 8	Mississippi St.	7	Davenport Field	6-11	Graveman (7-5)	Waddell (6-3)	Mitchell (2)	4,956	0-1
June 10	Mississippi St.	7	Davenport Field	5-6	Girodo (8-1)	Silverstein (10-2)	Holder (18)	4,956	0-2

Rankings from USA TODAY/ESPN Top 25 coaches' baseball poll. Parenthesis indicate tournament seedings.
*ACC Conference games
