= Elliott Avent =

American baseball coach

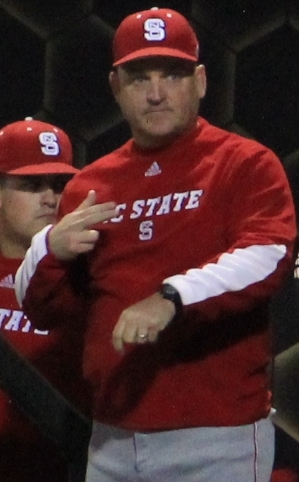
- Avent in 2013

Biographical details
- Born: May 1, 1956 (age 70)
- Education: VCU

Coaching career (HC unless noted)
- 1981–1982: North Carolina Wesleyan (asst.)
- 1983: VCU (asst.)
- 1984–1985: Louisburg JC (asst.)
- 1986–1987: William & Mary (asst.)
- 1988: NC State (asst.)
- 1989–1996: New Mexico State
- 1997–2026: NC State

Head coaching record
- Overall: 1,326–869 (.604)

Accomplishments and honors

Championships
- 6× NCAA regional champions (2003, 2008, 2012, 2013, 2021, 2024); 3× NCAA Super Regional champions (2013, 2021, 2024)

Awards
- ACC Coach of the Year (2003); Atlantic Region Coach of the Year (2003); National Coach of the Year (2003)

Elliott Avent (born May 1, 1956) is an American college baseball coach, who is the former head baseball coach for the NC State Wolfpack. He attended North Carolina State University, but he did not play for the baseball program. In his 30th season of coaching the Wolfpack, Avent has compiled both the most wins and most losses of any head baseball coach in NC State history.

== Early life ==
Avent attended North Carolina State University, and had intentions of playing college baseball for the Wolfpack, but when he saw the way coach Sammy Esposito treated other players Avent considered better than him, he decided to not try out for the team.

Avent left NC State when he was only about 20 credits away from a degree in textiles in order to focus on a career as a baseball coach. He started by accepting an assistant coaching job at North Carolina Wesleyan University. He would later finish a degree at Virginia Commonwealth University.

In 1993, Avent managed the Brewster Whitecaps, a collegiate summer baseball team in the prestigious Cape Cod Baseball League.

== Head coaching record ==
Record table
Season	Team	Overall	Conference	Standing	Postseason
New Mexico State Aggies (Independent) (1989–1991)
1989	New Mexico State	34–22			
1990	New Mexico State	40–19			
1991	New Mexico State	22–36			
New Mexico State Aggies (Big West Conference) (1992–1996)
1992	New Mexico State	20–33	6–18	T–8th	
1993	New Mexico State	31–23	9–12	T–4th	
1994	New Mexico State	21–31	4–17	8th	
1995	New Mexico State	32–22	9–12	5th	
1996	New Mexico State	25–27	8–13	T–5th	
New Mexico State:		225–213	36–72		
North Carolina State Wolfpack (Atlantic Coast Conference) (1997–2026)
1997	NC State	43–20	15–8	3rd	NCAA regional
1998	NC State	41–23	12–9	4th	NCAA regional
1999	NC State	37–25	11–13	6th	NCAA regional
2000	NC State	30–28	10–14	T–6th	
2001	NC State	32–29	9–15	T–6th	
2002	NC State	33–26	7–17	7th	
2003	NC State	45–18	15–9	T–3rd	NCAA Super Regional
2004	NC State	36–24	11–12	6th	NCAA regional
2005	NC State	41–19	17–13	6th	NCAA regional
2006	NC State	40–23	16–13	T–2nd (Atlantic)	NCAA regional
2007	NC State	38–23	16–14	3rd (Atlantic)	NCAA regional
2008	NC State	42–22	18–11	2nd (Atlantic)	NCAA Super Regional
2009	NC State	25–31	10–20	T–4th (Atlantic)	
2010	NC State	38–24	15–15	3rd (Atlantic)	NCAA regional
2011	NC State	35–27	15–15	T–3rd (Atlantic)	NCAA regional
2012	NC State	43–20	19–11	2nd (Atlantic)	NCAA Super Regional
2013	NC State	50–16	19–10	2nd (Atlantic)	College World Series
2014	NC State	32–23	13–17	5th (Atlantic)	
2015	NC State	36–23	15–14	5th (Atlantic)	NCAA regional
2016	NC State	38–22	15–13	3rd (Atlantic)	NCAA regional
2017	NC State	36–25	16–14	4th (Atlantic)	NCAA regional
2018	NC State	42–18	19–11	2nd (Atlantic)	NCAA regional
2019	NC State	42–19	18–12	2nd (Atlantic)	NCAA regional
2020	NC State	14–3	1–2	(Atlantic)	Season canceled due to COVID-19
2021	NC State	37–19	19–14	2nd (Atlantic)	College World Series
2022	NC State	36–21	14–15	5th (Atlantic)	
2023	NC State	36–21	13–16	5th (Atlantic)	NCAA regional
2024	NC State	38–23	18–11	2nd (Atlantic)	College World Series
2025	NC State	33–19	17–11	4th	NCAA regional
2026	NC State	32–24	14–16	T–9th	NCAA regional
NC State:		1,101–658	409–372		
Total:		1,326–871			
National champion Postseason invitational champion Conference regular season champion Conference regular season and conference tournament champion Division regular season champion Division regular season and conference tournament champion Conference tournament champion

== Personal life ==
Elliott is married to his wife Krista Ringler, and they reside in Raleigh, NC.

== See also ==
- List of current NCAA Division I baseball coaches
- List of college baseball career coaching wins leaders
