= Durham Bulls Athletic Park =

Baseball stadium in North Carolina, US

- DBAP
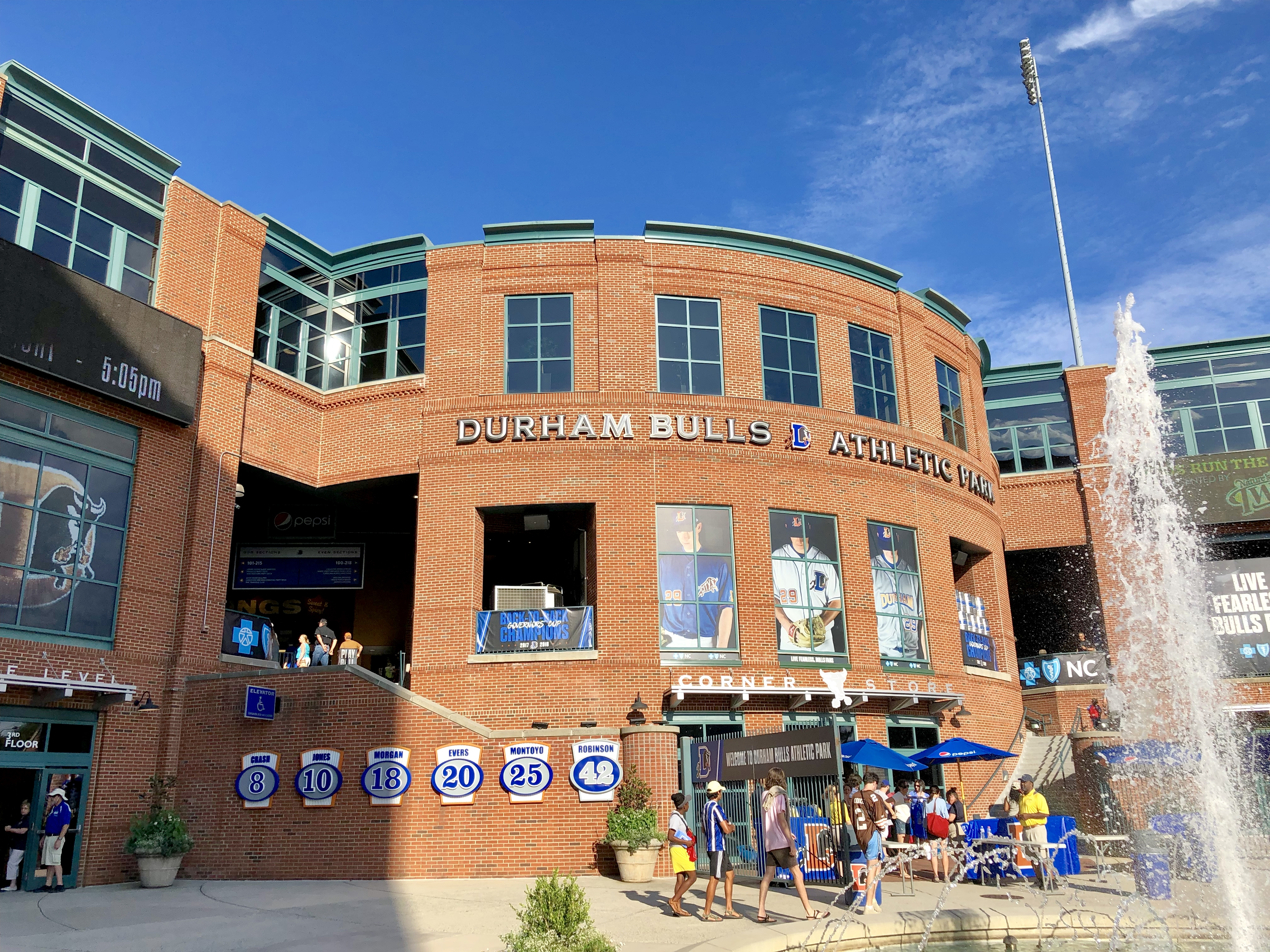
- The main entrance in 2019

- Location within North Carolina Location within the United States
- Location: 409 Blackwell Street; Durham, North Carolina; United States
- Coordinates: 35°59′30.08″N 78°54′15.07″W
- Owner: City of Durham
- Operator: Durham Bulls Baseball Club
- Capacity: 10,000 (1998–present); 9,033 (1995–1997)
- Surface: Grass
- Field size: Left field: 303 ft (92 m); Left-center field: 370 ft (110 m); Center field: 395 ft (120 m); Right-center field: 375 ft (114 m); Right field: 329 ft (100 m)

Construction
- Groundbreaking: April 24, 1993
- Opened: April 6, 1995
- Renovated: 2002–04, 2009, 2014, 2016, 2019, 2023, 2025
- Expanded: 1997–98, 2009–10, 2014, 2023
- Cost: US$18.5 million ($39.1 million in 2025 dollars)
- Architects: HOK Sport now Populous; The Freelon Group
- Project manager: CHA Enterprises
- Services engineer: Knott Benson Engineering Associates P.A.
- General contractor: George W. Kane Construction Co.

Tenants
- Durham Bulls (CL/IL/AAAE) 1995–present Duke Blue Devils (NCAA) 2010–2023; North Carolina Central Eagles (NCAA) 2007-2009

Durham Bulls Athletic Park (DBAP, pronounced "d-bap") is a 10,000-seat ballpark in Durham, North Carolina, that is home to the Durham Bulls, the Triple-A affiliate of the Tampa Bay Rays of Major League Baseball. It was also home to the Duke Blue Devils and North Carolina Central Eagles college baseball teams. The $18.5-million park opened in 1995 as the successor to Durham Athletic Park.

== History ==
The ballpark was designed by HOK Sport (now Populous), who also designed Camden Yards in Baltimore, Progressive Field in Cleveland, and Coors Field in Colorado as part of the "new" old-stadium-like movement of the 1990s. The Freelon Group, responsible for designing numerous buildings around North Carolina, also participated in the design. The Bulls began playing at the DBAP in 1995 when the team played in the Class A Advanced Carolina League. In 1998, Durham moved up to the Triple-A level, causing the DBAP to be expanded to 10,000 seats. The first Triple-A game was played on April 16, 1998.

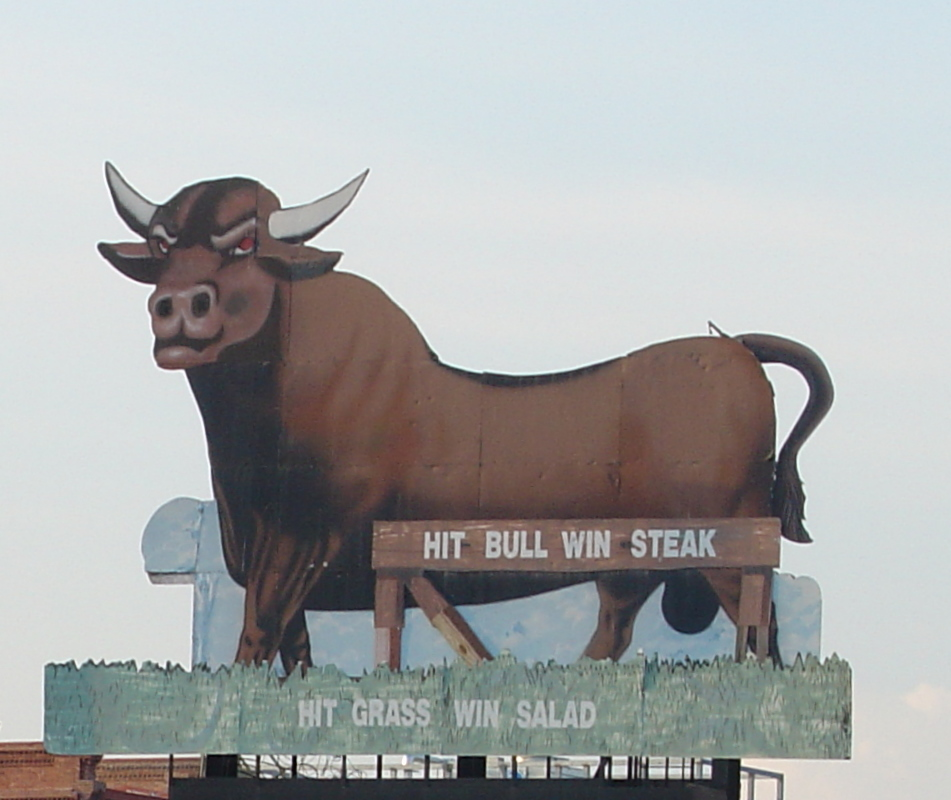
The second iteration of the snorting bull sign in May 2007

A roof covers approximately 2,500 seats behind home plate and down both the first and third base lines to the end of each dugout. All seats at the DBAP are extra wide with seat backs, extra leg room and over 95% of the seats have cup holders. The stadium was designed and built so that every seat gives fans a great view of the field with an intimate ballpark feel. Durham Bulls Athletic Park is located in downtown Durham and can be accessed from the Durham Freeway. The ballpark reflects many characteristics of old-time parks and the historic downtown Durham architecture.

Following a playoff game on September 6, 2007, the playing surface was named Goodmon Field, in honor of Jim Goodmon, owner of the Durham Bulls and CEO of Capitol Broadcasting.

On August 30, 2011, Triple-A Baseball announced that Durham Bulls Athletic Park would be the host site of the 2012 Triple-A National Championship Game on Tuesday, September 18, 2012. The Triple-A National Championship Game pits the winner of the International League's Governors' Cup against the Pacific Coast League Champions in a one-game, winner take all championship. The Bulls were the first International League team to host this annual game. The game was projected to bring in $2.5 million just for the city of Durham with another $2 million for the adjacent cities (including Raleigh). The game itself saw Reno of the PCL win an easy 10-3 victory over Pawtucket of the IL. On June 15, 2019, the DBAP set a new paid attendance record with 12,000 attending a game versus the Scranton /Wilkes-Barre RailRiders.

=== The Blue Monster ===
The ballpark's left-field fence is a 32-foot-high (9.8 m) wall, 305 feet (93 m) from home plate, known as the Blue Monster. It resembles Fenway Park's Green Monster, including a manual scoreboard. Original plans called for a wall 8 feet high, however, due to the park's dimensions conflicting with a nearby road designers shortened left field by several feet. As a result, the wall ended up being 24 feet tall. The wall reached its current height in 1998. The club introduced a furry "Blue Monster" mascot during the 2007 season who now shares mascot duties with "Wool E. Bull" and "Lucky the Wonder Dog".

The bull sign mounted atop of the Blue Monster was modeled after the bull used in the 1988 film, Bull Durham. The actual sign from the movie (which featured at the Bulls previous home, Durham Athletic Park) formerly hung in the DBAP concourse but is now in storage. Although much sturdier than the original, the new sign's limitations were revealed in violent winds that rocked the Piedmont on April 16, 2007 – the bull's head and forelegs were torn off by the storm. The damage was fixed by that weekend, but plans were made to replace the sign. The sign is now on its fourth iteration.

== Renovations ==
The ballpark has undergone a number of renovations and enhancements since opening, with its first renovations starting only a couple of years after the park opened. Construction of a "warehouse type" building, Diamond View, began in 1997 and was completed during the 1998 season. Diamond View is located behind the right field seating sections and uses the same architecture as the DBAP, including the green roof, brickwork and windows. In 2002, the DBAP unveiled a new playground area in the right field section of the concourse. In the Fall of 2003, the field of the DBAP received a major face lift. After nine years of service, the top layers of grass and soil were removed and replaced with brand new top soil and Tissport™ Bermuda grass. The renovation took place over several weeks and cost over $100,000.

Before the 2004 season, a 13' by 17' Daktronics ProStar LED video board was installed in place of the original scoreboard, giving the Bulls a major technology upgrade for the time. They were able to show instant replay and other graphics. Following the 2006 season, the DBAP underwent major renovations in the outfield, including a new left field wall complete with a new video board located above the manual scoreboard. The old video board was reshaped into a video billboard and placed in right field.

In 2008, with the addition of the Diamond View II building in left field, the Blue Monster pavilion opened allowing fans to watch the game atop the Blue Monster for the first time. The famous snorting bull was replaced by a new two-sided bull so that it may be viewed from Diamond View 2 and 3. The Bulls' TV Crew were also equipped with high-definition cameras and production equipment along with HD production capabilities that same year. This also complemented a new state-of-the-art BOSE sound system.

One year later a stairwell was added to the pavilion. This connected it to the third base concourse, making the DBAP a 360° ballpark. For the 2010 season, the Diamond View II Building opened a new restaurant called the "Tobacco Road Sports Cafe". It has outdoor seating to watch the game during game days or just to enjoy a North Carolina summer evening. Outside the ballpark are four more restaurants: the Cuban Revolution, Saladelia, Tyler's Restaurant & Taproom, and Mellow Mushroom. Construction of Diamond View III began in 2012 and was completed in 2013. Before the start of the 2016 season the Bulls announced additions to the park, including an updated kids play area called Playground 42. Two new message boards also were installed at the main entrance. The boards were made up from pieces of the park's former video board, which was removed due to the 2014 renovations. In 2015, the stadium became the first in Minor League Baseball to feature an active on-site microbrewery. The Bull Durham Beer Company, located on the main concourse behind home plate near Section 105, operates a 2.5-barrel system that allows fans to view the brewing process through glass partitions during games. Although the brand was acquired by Raleigh-based R&D Brewing in 2019, it remains the only production brewery located inside a minor league ballpark. In 2019, three new ribbon boards were added to the outside of the Diamond View II building.

=== 2014 Renovation ===
After the end of the 2013 season for the Durham Bulls, major renovations to the entire stadium began and were finished by opening day of the 2014 season. After a 20-year lease extension was signed between the Bulls and city of Durham, keeping the minor league team at the stadium through 2033, both parties agreed that improvements were much needed. The renovations cost approximately $9 million, $6 million of which was covered by the city. In their agreement to renovate the stadium, it was set that the city of Durham would have a maximum cap of $12 million spent on all renovations. Anything beyond the $12 million would be covered by the Bulls, with the team having to pay a minimum of $2 million towards the total costs.

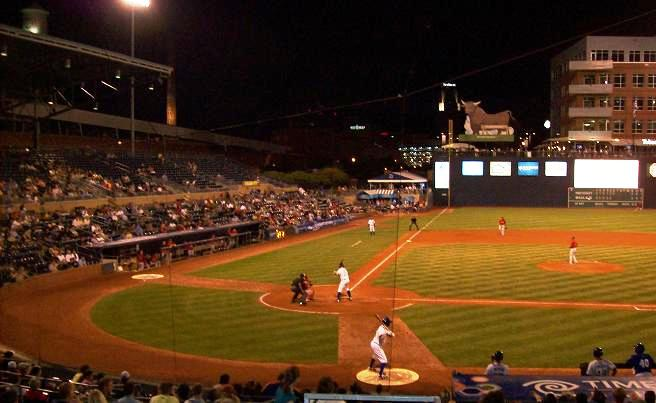
Game action at DBAP in 2010

The biggest issue for fans attending games at the DBAP had been long concession lines and an overcrowded concourse with no view of the field. To alleviate this problem, concessions were added to the upper-level concourse, which previously had none. New picnic areas were added down the third-base line and in the outfield stands. Additionally, a new club area was built that can also be used for non-Durham Bulls related events during the off-season. The club area now had its own kitchen, separate from the regular concessions' kitchen to help improve the speed of the food service.

The field was completely restructured within the renovation as well. The entire field and underground plumbing was removed and updated with new plumbing, better drainage, new sod, and a new crown to ensure that the field drains properly. This had not been done in the 18-year life of the stadium and was a much-needed part of the renovation.

Additionally, the stadium had new field lighting, a new ticket entrance down the third base line, and new scoreboards and video boards. TS Sports of Dallas was contracted to install three new state-of-the-art, HD displays. They include the Blue Monster primary display (25.4' (h) x 63' (w)), right field LED wall display (6.5' (h) x 327.6' (w)), and the club level fascia display (3.2' (h) x 119.8' (w)).

The renovations were finished before the opening pitch of the 2014 Durham Bulls season on April 3, 2014. The quick turnaround was primarily due to Durham being the host city for the 2014 Triple-A All-Star Game. This nationally televised game brought in visitors from across the country for a 5-day festival. Had it not been for this reason, Mike Birling, the Bulls then- general manager, stated that the renovation would have most likely been done in phases.

=== 2023 Renovation ===
The Bulls announced further renovations to the ballpark in 2023, including new office spaces, revamped locker rooms, an expanded team store, and a team history area called "History Hallway". The largest part of the renovation is a new indoor hitting space behind the third base line. Further renovations include various internal upgrades.

== Dimensions ==
The original dimensions were: Left Field – 305 ft (93.0 m), Left Center Field – 371 ft (113.1 m), Center Field – 400 ft (121.9 m), Right Center Field – 373 ft (113.7 m), Right Field – 327 ft (99.7 m). The power alleys are now posted as 375 ft (114.3 m) and right field as 325 ft (99.1 m).

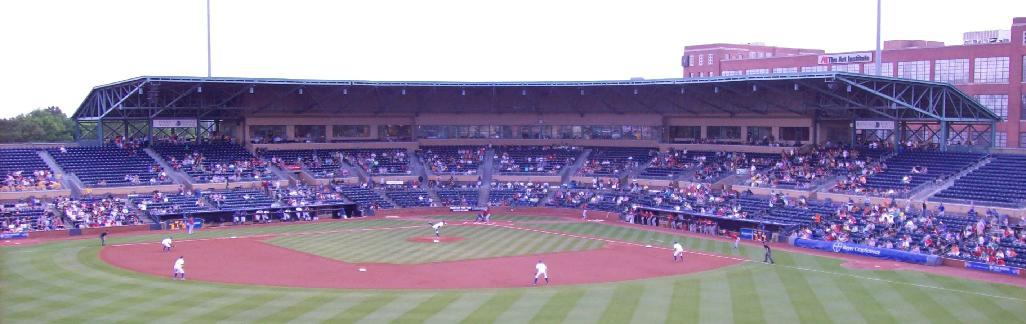
DBAP game action in 2010, bathed in twilight glow.

== Other events ==
In addition to hosting the Bulls, the ballpark has hosted other baseball events since its opening. These include hosting 12 ACC Baseball Tournaments, the 2012 Triple-A National Championship Game, and the 2014 Triple-A All-Star Game. In the 2012 Triple-A National Championship Game, the Pacific Coast League's Reno Aces defeated the International League's Pawtucket Red Sox, 10–3. In the 2014 Triple-A All-Star Game, the International League All-Stars defeated the Pacific Coast League All-Stars, 7–3. Perhaps the most significant game during any of the events was an 18-inning contest between the UNC Tar Heels and the NC State Wolfpack during the 2013 ACC tournament semifinals, in which the Tar Heels won, 2–1. It set records for both the largest attendance for a college baseball game in NC with 11,392 attending, and the longest baseball game in ACC tournament history.

Select USA Baseball Collegiate National Team games are held in the stadium.. The "Cosmic Takeover Tour", featuring glow-in-the-dark bases, as well as player uniforms, came to the DBAP the first time in 2025, and is returning to the stadium for three new dates in 2026.

== See also ==
- List of NCAA Division I baseball venues
- American Tobacco Historic District
- Minor League Baseball

Events and tenants
Preceded by Durham Athletic Park	Home of the Durham Bulls; 1995 – present	Succeeded by current
