= 2014 TCU Horned Frogs baseball team =

Team of Texas Christian University

2014 TCU Horned Frogs baseball

Big 12 Conference Tournament champions Fort Worth Regional champions Fort Worth Super Regional champions

College World Series, L, 1–2
- Conference: Big 12 Conference
- Record: 48–18 (17–7 Big 12)
- Head coach: Jim Schlossnagle (11th season)
- Hitting coach: Bill Mosiello (1st season)
- Pitching coach: Kirk Saarloos (2nd season)
- Home stadium: Lupton Stadium

2014 Big 12 Conference baseball standings
	Conf.				Overall
Team	W		L	PCT	W		L	PCT
No. 10 Oklahoma State ‍†‍‍^{y}	18	–	6	.750	48	–	18	.727
No. 5 TCU ‍‍‡‍^{y}	17	–	7	.708	48	–	18	.727
Kansas ‍‍‍^{y}	15	–	9	.625	35	–	26	.574
No. 8 Texas Tech ‍‍‍^{y}	14	–	10	.583	45	–	21	.682
No. 3 Texas ‍‍‍^{y}	13	–	11	.542	46	–	21	.687
West Virginia ‍‍‍	9	–	14	.391	28	–	26	.519
Baylor ‍‍‍	8	–	15	.348	26	–	31	.456
Oklahoma ‍‍‍	8	–	16	.333	29	–	29	.500
Kansas State ‍‍‍	5	–	19	.208	25	–	30	.455
† – Conference champion ‡ – Tournament champion y – Invited to the NCAA tournament Rankings from Collegiate Baseball

The 2014 TCU Horned Frogs baseball team represented Texas Christian University (TCU) in the 2014 college baseball season. TCU competed in Division I of the National Collegiate Athletic Association (NCAA) as a member of the Big 12 Conference. The Horned Frogs played home games at Lupton Stadium on the university's campus in Fort Worth, Texas. The team was led by eleventh-year head coach Jim Schlossnagle.

== Personnel ==
=== Coaches ===
2014 TCU Horned Frogs baseball coaching staff
No.	Name	Position	Tenure	Alma mater
22	Jim Schlossnagle	Head coach	11th season	Elon University
14	Bill Mosiello	Associate head coach	1st season	California State University, Fresno
2	Kirk Saarloos	Assistant coach	2nd season	California State University, Fullerton
28	Zach Etheredge	Volunteer assistant coach	1st season	University of Texas at San Antonio

=== Players ===
2014 TCU Horned Frogs baseball roster
No.	Name	Pos.	B	T	CL	Hometown	Previous school
00	Kevin Cron	1B	R	R	Jr.	Phoenix, Arizona	Mountain Pointe High School
1	Cody Jones	OF	S	R	Jr.	Round Rock, Texas	Temple College
3	Ty Slanina	OF	L	L	Fr.	East Bernard, Texas	East Bernard High School
4	Connor Castellano	INF	L	R	Jr.	Shreveport, Louisiana	Santa Fe College
5	Derek Odell	INF	L	R	Jr.	Canyon, Texas	Canyon High School
6	Kyle Bacak	C	R	R	Sr.	Katy, Texas	San Jacinto College
7	Michael Landestoy	1B	R	R	Fr.	Santo Domingo, Dominican Republic	Saint George School
8	Boomer White	OF	R	R	So.	Houston, Texas	Memorial High School
9	Michael Douglas	INF	R	R	Jr.	Atlanta, Georgia	Lee County High School
11	Travis Evans	LHP	L	L	Jr.	Round Rock, Texas	Round Rock High School
12	Riley Ferrell	RHP	R	R	So.	College Station, Texas	A&M Consolidated High School
13	Tyler Alexander	LHP	L	L	Fr.	Southlake, Texas	Carroll Senior High School
15	Dylan Delso	C	S	R	So.	Broken Arrow, Oklahoma	Cowley College
17	Ryan Burnett	LHP	L	L	Fr.	The Woodlands, Texas	The Woodlands High School
18	Preston Morrison	RHP	R	R	Jr.	Waxhaw, North Carolina	Cuthbertson High School
21	Brian Trieglaff	INF	R	R	RS Fr.	Houston, Texas	Houston Christian High School
23	Alex Young	LHP	L	L	So.	Hawthorn Woods, Illinois	Carmel Catholic High School
24	Connor Beck	OF	R	R	Fr.	Midland, Texas	Midland High School
25	Will Foreman	C/OF	R	R	Jr.	Houston, Texas	Lamar High School
26	Keaton Jones	INF	R	R	Jr.	Laguna Beach, California	Laguna Beach High School
27	Jordan Kipper	RHP	R	R	Jr.	Phoenix, Arizona	Central Arizona College
29	Brandon Finnegan	LHP	L	L	Jr.	Fort Worth, Texas	Southwest High School
31	Jerrick Suiter	C/OF	R	R	Jr.	Valparaiso, Indiana	Valparaiso High School
32	Jeremie Fagnan	OF	L	R	Jr.	Calgary, Alberta	Midland College
33	Mitchell Traver	RHP	R	R	RS Fr.	Sugar Land, Texas	Houston Christian High School
34	Garrett Crain	INF	S	R	Jr.	Mustang, Oklahoma	Rose State College
35	Robby Medel	RHP	R	R	Fr.	Arlington, Texas	Bowie High School
37	Walker Pennington	OF	R	R	Fr.	Houston, Texas	Memorial High School
38	Dylan Fitzgerald	OF	L	R	Sr.	Santa Ana, California	Cypress College
39	Preston Templer	RHP	R	R	Fr.	Fort Worth, Texas	All Saints' Episcopal School
40	Trey Teakell	RHP	R	R	RS Jr.	Weatherford, Texas	Weatherford High School
43	Brandon Gilson	LHP	L	L	Fr.	Prosper, Texas	Prosper High School
44	Brian Howard	RHP	R	R	Fr.	St. Louis, Missouri	St. Louis University High School
47	Will Fox	INF	L	R	Fr.	Montgomery, Texas	Montgomery High School

== Schedule ==
2014 TCU Horned Frogs baseball game log: 48–18
Regular season: 38–15

February: 6–3
Date	Time	Opponent	Rank	Site/stadium	Result	Win	Loss	Save	Attendance	Overall	Big 12
February 14	6:30 PM	Jacksonville	No. 19	Lupton Stadium • Fort Worth, TX	W 5–0	Finnegan (1–0)	McRae (0–1)		3,742	1–0	
February 15	2:00 PM	Jacksonville	No. 19	Lupton Stadium • Fort Worth, TX	W 5–1	Morrison (1–0)	Gordon (0–1)	—	3,375	2–0	
February 16	1:00 PM	Jacksonville	No. 19	Lupton Stadium • Fort Worth, TX	L 0–2	Russel (1–0)	Alexander (0–1)	Maxon (1)	3,105	2–1	—
February 18	6:30 PM	Northern Colorado	No. 19	Lupton Stadium • Fort Worth, TX	W 10–3	Kipper (1–0)	Wagner (0–1)	—	3,107	3–1	—
February 21	2:00 PM	vs. BYU	No. 19	Whataburger Field • Corpus Christi, TX (Kleberg Bank College Classic)	W 10–0	Finnegan (2–0)	Mahoney (0–2)	—	N/A	4–1	—
February 22	6:00 PM	at Texas A&M–CC	No. 19	Whataburger Field • Corpus Christi, TX (Kleberg Bank College Classic)	W 7–4	Ferrell (1–0)	Keith (0–1)	—	2,839	5–1	—
February 23	12:00 PM	vs. UTSA	No. 19	Whataburger Field • Corpus Christi, TX (Kleberg Bank College Classic)	W 5–1	Alexander (1–1)	Justin Anderson (1–1)	Teakell (1)	2,377	6–1	—
February 25	6:30 PM	UT Arlington	No. 12	Lupton Stadium • Fort Worth, TX	L 2–10	Vachon (1–2)	Kipper (1–1)	—	2,837	6–2	—
February 28	3:36 PM	vs. Sam Houston State	No. 12	Minute Maid Park • Houston, TX (Houston College Classic)	L 4–9	Eppler (2–1)	Finnegan (2–1)	—	N/A	6–3	—

March: 9–9
Date	Time	Opponent	Rank	Site/stadium	Score	Win	Loss	Save	Attendance	Overall	Big 12
March 1	7:35 PM	vs. No. 15 Rice	No. 12	Minute Maid Park • Houston, TX (Houston College Classic)	L 0–1	Fox (3–0)	Morrison (1–1)	Lemond (3)	N/A	6–4	—
March 2	5:34 PM	vs. Houston	No. 12	Minute Maid Park • Houston, TX (Houston College Classic)	W 2–1	Young (1–0)	Robinson (1–1)	Ferrell (1)	N/A	7–4	—
March 4	6:35 PM	Dallas Baptist	No. 28	Lupton Stadium • Fort Worth, TX	W 5–4^{(15)}	Triglaff (1–0)	Conn (0–1)	—	2,755	8–4	—
March 7	6:35 PM	Michigan State	No. 28	Lupton Stadium • Fort Worth, TX	L 1–2	Vieaux (1–1)	Finnegan (2–2)	Lowery (2)	3,126	8–5	—
March 8	1:04 PM	Michigan State	No. 28	Lupton Stadium • Fort Worth, TX	L 1–4	VanVossen (3–0)	Morrison (1–2)	Kinley (4)	2,910	8–6	—
March 9	1:02 PM	Michigan State	No. 28	Lupton Stadium • Fort Worth, TX	W 6–2	Alexander (2–1)	Rihtarchick (0–2)	—	3,144	9–6	—
March 11	6:30 PM	at No. 29 Rice	No. 30	Reckling Park • Houston, TX	L 0–5	McDowell (2–1)	Kipper (1–2)	McCarthy (1)	2,889	9–7	—
March 14	6:30 PM	Dartmouth	No. 30	Lupton Stadium • Fort Worth, TX	W 4–1	Finnegan (3–2)	Concato (0–1)	Ferrell (2)	3,461	10–7	—
March 15	2:00 PM	Dartmouth	No. 30	Lupton Stadium • Fort Worth, TX	W 5–1	Morrison (2–2)	Danielak (0–1)	—	2,968	11–7	—
March 16	1:00 PM	Dartmouth	No. 30	Lupton Stadium • Fort Worth, TX	W 8–0	Alexander (3–1)	Sulser (1–1)	—	2,751	12–7	—
March 18	6:00 PM	at Oklahoma	No. 27	L. Dale Mitchell Baseball Park • Norman, OK	L 5–9	Evans (2–1)	Young (1–1)	—	1,154	12–8	—
March 21	6:30 PM	Texas Tech*	No. 27	Lupton Stadium • Fort Worth, TX	W 9–0	Finnegan (4–2)	Moreno (1–4)	—	4,242	13–8	1–0
March 22	2:00 PM	Texas Tech*	No. 27	Lupton Stadium • Fort Worth, TX	L 2–10	Drozd (2–0)	Morrison (2–3)	—	4,028	13–9	1–1
March 23	1:00 PM	Texas Tech*	No. 27	Lupton Stadium • Fort Worth, TX	L 2–12	Sadberry (3–1)	Alexander (3–2)	—	3,548	13–10	1–2
March 25	6:30 PM	UT Pan American		Lupton Stadium • Fort Worth, TX	W 11–0	Kipper (2–2)	Tokunaga (1–3)	—	2,759	14–10	—
March 26	6:30 PM	UT Pan American		Lupton Stadium • Fort Worth, TX	Cancelled (rain)						
March 28	6:30 PM	at Oklahoma State*		Allie P. Reynolds Stadium • Stillwater, OK	W 3–1	Finnegan (5–2)	Perrin (2–2)	Ferrell (3)	482	15–10	2–2
March 29	3:00 PM	at Oklahoma State*		Allie P. Reynolds Stadium • Stillwater, OK	L 1–2	McCurry (5–0)	Young (1–2)	—	1,664	15–11	2–3
March 30	1:00 PM	at Oklahoma State*		Allie P. Reynolds Stadium • Stillwater, OK	L 4–9	Wheeland (1–0)	Alexander (3–3)	—	1,210	15–12	2–4

April: 16–1
Date	Time	Opponent	Rank	Site/stadium	Score	Win	Loss	Save	Attendance	Overall	Big 12
April 1	6:30 PM	at UT Arlington		Clay Gould Ballpark • Arlington, TX	W 12–6	Kipper (3–2)	Schnedler (1–2)	—	609	16–12	—
April 4	6:30 PM	West Virginia*		Lupton Stadium • Fort Worth, TX	W 4–3	Teakell (1–0)	Bennett (2–1)	—	3,578	17–12	3–4
April 5	2:00 PM	West Virginia*		Lupton Stadium • Fort Worth, TX	W 8–0	Morrison (3–3)	Carley (5–1)	—	3,924	18–12	4–4
April 5	5:00 PM	West Virginia*		Lupton Stadium • Fort Worth, TX	W 3–1	Alexander (4–3)	Bennett (2–2)	Ferrell (4)	3,924	19–12	5–4
April 8	6:30 PM	at Dallas Baptist		Horner Ballpark • Dallas, TX	W 7–1	Kipper (4–2)	Smith (2–2)	—	955	20–12	—
April 11	6:00 PM	at Kansas*		Hoglund Ballpark • Lawrence, KS	W 5–2	Finnegan (6–2)	Piche (4–4)	Ferrell (5)	1,234	21–12	6–4
April 12	3:00 PM	at Kansas*		Hoglund Ballpark • Lawrence, KS	W 3–1	Morrison (4–3)	Kahana (2–5)	Ferrell (6)	1,530	22–12	7–4
April 12	6:00 PM	at Kansas*		Hoglund Ballpark • Lawrence, KS	L 1–5	Duncan (4–1)	Young (1–3)	Villines (4)	1,530	22–13	7–5
April 15	6:30 PM	Houston Baptist		Lupton Stadium • Fort Worth, TX	W 13–0	Kipper (5–2)	McCollough (1–1)	—	2,886	23–13	—
April 17	6:00 PM	at No. 4 Texas*		UFCU Disch–Falk Field • Austin, TX	W 3–0	Finnegan (7–2)	French (4–3)	Ferrell (7)	5,435	24–13	8–5
April 18	4:00 PM	at No. 4 Texas*		UFCU Disch–Falk Field • Austin, TX	W 2–0	Morrison (5–3)	Peters (5–3)	Ferrell (8)	6,757	25–13	9–5
April 19	2:00 PM	at No. 4 Texas*		UFCU Disch–Falk Field • Austin, TX	W 3–1	Teakell (2–0)	Thornhill (6–1)	Ferrell (9)	7,535	26–13	10–5
April 22	6:00 PM	vs. No. 21 Texas Tech	No. 15	Crutcher Scott Field • Abilene, TX	W 4–0	Kipper (6–2)	Taylor (5–1)	Teakell (2)	1,437	27–13	—
April 25	6:30 PM	Cal State Northridge	No. 15	Lupton Stadium • Fort Worth, TX	W 6–2	Teakell (3–0)	Rutherford (3–4)	Young (1)	3,228	28–13	—
April 26	4:00 PM	Cal State Northridge	No. 15	Lupton Stadium • Fort Worth, TX	W 1–0	Morrison (6–3)	Maltese (2–2)	—	3,756	29–13	—
April 27	1:00 PM	Cal State Northridge	No. 15	Lupton Stadium • Fort Worth, TX	W 3–0	Alexander (5–3)	Salas (4–4)	Ferrell (10)	3,027	30–13	—
April 29	6:30 PM	at Stephen F. Austin	No. 13	Jaycees Field • Nacogdoches TX	W 14–4	Kipper (7–2)	Maynard (0–3)	—	592	31–13	—

May: 7–2
Date	Time	Opponent	Rank	Site/stadium	Score	Win	Loss	Save	Attendance	Overall	Big 12
May 2	6:30 PM	Kansas State*	No. 13	Lupton Stadium • Fort Worth, TX	W 5–0	Morrison (7–3)	MaVorhis (5–6)	—	3,613	32–13	11–5
May 3	4:00 PM	Kansas State*	No. 13	Lupton Stadium • Fort Worth, TX	W 3–1	Alexander (6–3)	Griep (3–5)	Ferrell (11)	3,584	33–13	12–5
May 4	1:00 PM	Kansas State*	No. 13	Lupton Stadium • Fort Worth, TX	W 21–7	Teakell (4–0)	Moore (5–3)	—	3,630	34–13	13–5
May 9	6:30 PM	Oklahoma*	No. 10	Lupton Stadium • Fort Worth, TX	W 10–2	Finnegan (8–2)	Evans (3–4)	—	4,046	35–13	14–5
May 10	3:30 PM	Oklahoma*	No. 10	Lupton Stadium • Fort Worth, TX	L 5–7^{(11)}	Neuse (1–0)	Ferrell (1–1)	—	3,839	35–14	14–6
May 11	1:00 PM	Oklahoma*	No. 10	Lupton Stadium • Fort Worth, TX	W 9–1	Alexander (7–3)	Choplick (3–4)	—	3,485	36–14	15–6
May 13	11:30 AM	UT Arlington	No. 9	Lupton Stadium • Fort Worth, TX	Cancelled (rain)						
May 15	6:35 PM	at Baylor*	No. 9	Baylor Ballpark • Waco, TX	L 3–6	Newman (5–3)	Finnegan (8–3)	—	2,636	36–15	15–7
May 16	6:35 PM	at Baylor*	No. 9	Baylor Ballpark • Waco, TX	W 5–0	Morrison (8–3)	Castano (5–4)	—	2,891	37–15	16–7
May 17	3:05 PM	at Baylor*	No. 9	Baylor Ballpark • Waco, TX	W 7–1	Alexander (8–3)	Lewis (2–2)	—	3,496	38–15	17–7

Post–season: 10–3

Big 12 Tournament (4–0)
Date	Time	Opponent	Seed/Rank	Site/stadium	Result	Win	Loss	Save	Attendance	Overall	B12T
May 21	12:30 PM	vs. (7) Baylor	(2) No. 12	Chickasaw Bricktown Ballpark • Oklahoma City, OK	W 8–5	Kipper (8–2)	Newman (5–4)	Ferrell (12)	N/A	39–15	1–0
May 22	4:00 PM	vs. (6) West Virginia	(2) No. 12	Chickasaw Bricktown Ballpark • Oklahoma City, OK	W 6–2	Morrison (9–3)	Walter (1–6)	—	4,164	40–15	2–0
May 24	9:00 AM	vs. (7) Baylor	(2) No. 12	Chickasaw Bricktown Ballpark • Oklahoma City, OK	W 4–1	Teakell (5–0)	Michalec (0–5)	Ferrell (13)	4,474	41–15	3–0
May 25	4:15 PM	vs. (1) No. 7 Oklahoma State	(2) No. 12	Chickasaw Bricktown Ballpark • Oklahoma City, OK	W 7–1	Alexander (9–3)	Freeman (2–1)	—	7,686	42–15	4–0

Fort Worth Regional (3–0)
Date	Time	Opponent	Seed/Rank	Site/stadium	Result	Win	Loss	Save	Attendance	Overall	NCAAT
May 30	7:00 PM	vs. (4) Siena	(1) No. 9	Lupton Stadium • Fort Worth, TX	W 2–1^{(11)}	Teakell (6–0)	Quintana (4–3)	—	4,120	43–15	1–0
May 31	7:00 PM	vs. (3) Sam Houston State	(1) No. 9	Lupton Stadium • Fort Worth, TX	W 3–2^{(22)}	Trieglaff (2–0)	Ebbs (3–2)	Ferrell (14)	4,207	44–15	2–0
June 1	7:00 PM	vs. (3) Sam Houston State	(1) No. 9	Lupton Stadium • Fort Worth, TX	W 6–1	Alexander (10–3)	Godail (3–1)	—	4,012	45–15	3–0

Fort Worth Super Regional (2–1)
Date	Time	Opponent	Seed/Rank	Site/stadium	Result	Win	Loss	Save	Attendance	Overall	NCAAT
June 7	3:00 PM	No. 11 Pepperdine	(7) No. 3	Lupton Stadium • Fort Worth, TX	W 3–2	Finnegan (9–3)	Miller (9–5)	Ferrell (15)	5,094	46–15	4–0
June 8	5:00 PM	No. 11 Pepperdine	(7) No. 3	Lupton Stadium • Fort Worth, TX	L 2–3	Brown (13–1)	Morrison (9–4)	Karch (16)	5,620	46–16	4–1
June 9	3:00 PM	No. 11 Pepperdine	(7) No. 3	Lupton Stadium • Fort Worth, TX	W 6–5	Ferrell (2–1)	Karch (4–2)	—	4,450	47–16	5–1

College World Series (1–2)
Date	Time	Opponent	Rank	Site/stadium	Result	Win	Loss	Save	Attendance	Overall	CWS
June 15	2:00 PM	vs. No. 7 Texas Tech	(7) No. 2	TD Ameritrade Park • Omaha, NE	W 3–2	Ferrell (3–2)	Drozd (7–1)	—	24,587	48–16	1–0
June 17	7:00 PM	vs. (3) No. 1 Virginia	(7) No. 2	TD Ameritrade Park • Omaha, NE	L 2–3^{(15)}	Lewicki (8–1)	Teakell (6–1)	—	24,285	48–17	1–1
June 19	7:00 PM	vs. No. 4 Ole Miss	(7) No. 2	TD Ameritrade Park • Omaha, NE	L 4–6	Laxer (3–2)	Kipper (8–3)	Greenwood (5)	25,873	48–18	1–2
*Big 12 Conference game. ^{#}Rankings from Collegiate Baseball released prior to game. All times are in Central Time.

== Ranking movements ==
Ranking movements Legend: ██ Increase in ranking ██ Decrease in ranking — = Not ranked
	Week																		
Poll	Pre	1	2	3	4	5	6	7	8	9	10	11	12	13	14	15	16	17	Final
Coaches'	23	23*	—	—	—	—	—	—	—	—	—	21	19	19	19	10	—	—	
Baseball America	19	19	16	22	—	—	—	—	—	—	23	17	12	13	13	9	—	—	
Collegiate Baseball^	19	19	12	28	30	27	—	—	—	—	15	13	10	9	12	9	3	2	
NCBWA†	22	23	16	21	27	24	—	—	—	—	28	22	20	20	20	16	7	—	

^ Collegiate Baseball ranked 40 teams in their preseason poll, but only ranked 30 teams weekly during the season.
† NCBWA ranks 30 teams in their preseason poll, but only ranks 25 teams weekly during the season.
* A new poll was not released for this week, so for comparison purposes, the previous week's ranking is inserted in this week's slot.
