= 2014 Texas Tech Red Raiders baseball team =

American college baseball season

2014 Texas Tech Red Raiders baseball

Coral Gables Regional champions Lubbock Super Regional champions

College World Series, 0–2
- Conference: Big 12 Conference

Ranking
- Coaches: No. 8^{T}
- CB: No. 8
- Record: 45–21 (14–10 Big 12)
- Head coach: Tim Tadlock (2nd season)
- Assistant coaches: J-Bob Thomas (2nd season); Matt Gardner (1st season)
- Pitching coach: Ray Hayward (2nd season)
- Home stadium: Dan Law Field at Rip Griffin Park

2014 Big 12 Conference baseball standings
	Conf.				Overall
Team	W		L	PCT	W		L	PCT
No. 10 Oklahoma State ‍†‍‍^{y}	18	–	6	.750	48	–	18	.727
No. 5 TCU ‍‍‡‍^{y}	17	–	7	.708	48	–	18	.727
Kansas ‍‍‍^{y}	15	–	9	.625	35	–	26	.574
No. 8 Texas Tech ‍‍‍^{y}	14	–	10	.583	45	–	21	.682
No. 3 Texas ‍‍‍^{y}	13	–	11	.542	46	–	21	.687
West Virginia ‍‍‍	9	–	14	.391	28	–	26	.519
Baylor ‍‍‍	8	–	15	.348	26	–	31	.456
Oklahoma ‍‍‍	8	–	16	.333	29	–	29	.500
Kansas State ‍‍‍	5	–	19	.208	25	–	30	.455
† – Conference champion ‡ – Tournament champion y – Invited to the NCAA tournament Rankings from Collegiate Baseball

The 2014 Texas Tech Red Raiders baseball team represented Texas Tech University in the 2014 college baseball season. Texas Tech competed in Division I of the National Collegiate Athletic Association (NCAA) as a charter member of the Big 12 Conference. The Red Raiders played home games at Dan Law Field at Rip Griffin Park on the university's campus in Lubbock, Texas. Second year head coach Tim Tadlock led the Red Raiders, a former starting shortstop for the team during the 1990 and 1991 seasons.

== Personnel ==
=== Coaches ===
2014 Texas Tech Red Raiders baseball coaching staff
No.	Name	Position	Tenure	Alma mater
6	Tim Tadlock	Head coach	2nd Season (Note: 3rd season overall coaching with the Texas Tech Red Raiders.)	Texas Tech University; University of Texas at Tyler
33	Ray Hayward	Pitching Coach	2nd Season	University of Oklahoma
19	J-Bob Thomas	Recruiting Coordinator; Assistant Coach	2nd Season	Abilene Christian University
15	Matt Gardner	Volunteer Assistant Coach	1st Season	Oklahoma State University

=== Players ===
2014 Texas Tech Red Raiders baseball roster
No.	Name	Pos.	B	T	CL	Hometown	Previous school
1	Tim Proudfoot	INF	R	R	Jr.	North Bend, Washington	Mount Si High School
3	Jake Barrios	INF	R	R	Sr.	Weatherford, Oklahoma	Seward County Community College
4	Todd Ritchie	OF	L	L	Sr.	Georgetown, Texas	Howard College
5	Hunter Redman	C	R	R	Jr.	Midland, Texas	Midland College
7	Ryan Long	INF	L	R	Fr.	Crandall, Texas	Crandall High School
8	Alec Humphreys	INF	R	R	So.	Midlothian, Texas	Midlothian High School
9	Adam Kirsch	OF	R	R	Sr.	Spring, Texas	Florida International University
10	Tyler Neslony	OF	L	R	So.	Corpus Christi, Texas	Calallen High School
11	Stephen Smith	OF/RHP	R	R	Fr.	Wolfforth, Texas	Frenship High School
12	Eric Gutierrez	UTL/LHP	R	L	So.	Mission, Texas	Sharyland High School
13	Dalton Brown	RHP	R	R	So.	Ponder, Texas	Ponder High School
14	Dominic Moreno	RHP	R	R	Jr.	Farmington, New Mexico	Howard College
16	Tyler Floyd	C	R	R	So.	Stephenville, Texas	McLennan Community College
17	Zach Davis	OF	R	R	So.	Houston, Texas	Cypress Lakes High School
18	Mason Randolph	C	S	R	Sr.	Lubbock, Texas	Coronado High School
20	Cameron Smith	LHP	L	L	Jr.	Seabrook, Texas	New Mexico Junior College
21	Bryant Burleson	INF	R	R	Jr.	Midland, Texas	Midland Christian School
25	Matt Broadbent	INF	R	R	Fr.	Cypress, Texas	Cypress Woods High School
26	Nick Pettus	RHP/INF	R	R	Jr.	Broken Arrow, Oklahoma	Seminole State College
28	Devon Conley	OF	R	R	RS Fr.	Rio Rancho, New Mexico	New Mexico Junior College
29	Anthony Lyons	OF	L	L	Fr.	Arlington, Texas	Martin High School
30	Jonny Drozd	LHP	L	L	Sr.	Lake Dallas, Texas	Grayson College
32	Justin Bethard	RHP	R	R	So.	Frisco, Texas	Centennial High School
34	Corey Taylor	RHP	R	R	Jr.	Kennedale, Texas	Cisco College
35	Matt Withrow	RHP	R	R	So.	Odessa, Texas	Midland Christian School
36	Ty Damron	LHP	L	L	Fr.	Krum, Texas	Krum High School
37	Matt Custred	RHP	R	R	So.	Keller, Texas	Keller High School
38	Johnathon Tripp	RHP/UTL	R	R	So.	Spring, Texas	Klein High School
39	Brock Hunt	RHP	R	R	RS So.	Madison, Mississippi	Howard College
41	Dylan Dusek	LHP	L	L	Fr.	Sugar Land, Texas	Kempner High School
42	Chris Sadberry	LHP	L	L	RS Jr.	Holliday, Texas	Grayson College
44	Ryan Moseley	RHP	R	R	Fr.	Lubbock, Texas	Lubbock-Cooper High School
45	Heath Herrington	RHP	R	R	RS Jr.	Amarillo, Texas	Cisco College
46	Matt Riney	RHP	R	R	Fr.	Weatherford, Texas	Weatherford High School
48	Sean Thompson	RHP	R	R	Fr.	Southlake, Texas	Carroll Senior High School
49	Blake Douglas	RHP	R	R	RS So.	McKinney, Texas	Weatherford College

== Schedule ==
2014 Texas Tech Red Raiders baseball game log: 45–21
Regular season: 40–16

February: 8–2
Date	Time	Opponent	Rank	Site/stadium	Score	Win	Loss	Save	Attendance	Overall	Big 12	Ref
February 14	2:00 p.m.	No. 7 Indiana*		Dan Law Field; Lubbock, TX	**L** 0–1	DeNato (1–0)	**Moreno** (0–1)	Halstead (1)	2,751	0–1	—	
February 15	12:00 p.m.	No. 7 Indiana*		Dan Law Field; Lubbock, TX	**W** 10–5	**Withrow** (1–0)	Hart (0–1)	—		1–1	—	
February 15	3:15 p.m.	No. 7 Indiana*		Dan Law Field; Lubbock, TX	**W** 6–2	**Sadberry** (1–0)	Morris (0–1)	—	3,387	2–1	—	
February 16	12:00 p.m.	No. 7 Indiana*		Dan Law Field; Lubbock, TX	**W** 7–0	**Smith** (1–0)	Coursen-Carr (0–1)	—	2,633	3–1	—	
February 21	2:00 p.m.	Oral Roberts*; Brooks Wallace; Memorial Series	No. 30	Dan Law Field; Lubbock, TX	**W** 3–2	**Smith** (2–0)	Giller (0–2)	**Drozd** (1)	2,011	4–1	—	
February 22	2:00 p.m.	Oral Roberts*; Brooks Wallace; Memorial Series	No. 30	Dan Law Field; Lubbock, TX	**W** 7–2	**Taylor** (1–0)	Trujillo (0–1)	—	3,347	5–1	—	
February 23	1:00 p.m.	Oral Roberts*; Brooks Wallace; Memorial Series	No. 30	Dan Law Field; Lubbock, TX	**W** 4–1	**Smith** (3–0)	Glanz (1–1)	**Tripp** (1)	2,225	6–1	—	
February 24	1:00 p.m.	BYU*	No. 26	Dan Law Field; Lubbock, TX	**W** 4–2	**Dusek** (1–0)	Springer (0–1)	**Moseley** (1)	1,863	7–1	—	
February 27	12:30 p.m.	at Stephen F. Austin*	No. 26	Jaycees Field; Nacogdoches, TX	**W** 5–4	**Damron** (1–0)	Wiedenfield (1–1)	**Drozd** (2)	162	8–1	—	
February 28	12:05 p.m.	vs. Houston*; Houston College Classic	No. 26	Minute Maid Park; Houston, TX	**L** 0–9	Garza (3–0)	**Moreno** (0–2)	—		8–2	—	

March: 14–7
Date	Time	Opponent	Rank	Site/stadium	Score	Win	Loss	Save	Attendance	Overall	Big 12	Ref
March 1	12:05 p.m.	vs. Sam Houston State*; Houston College Classic	No. 26	Minute Maid Park; Houston, TX	**L** 6–10	Odom (2–0)	**Withrow** (1–1)	—	7,839	8–3	—	
March 2	2:05 p.m.	vs. No. 15 Rice*; Houston College Classic	No. 26	Minute Maid Park; Houston, TX	**W** 2–1	**Sadberry** (2–0)	Duplantier (0–1)	**Moseley** (2)		9–3	—	
March 4	2:00 p.m.	New Mexico*		Dan Law Field; Lubbock, TX	**W** 9–3	**Smith** (4–0)	Cole (0–1)	—	1,521	10–3	—	
March 6	6:30 p.m.	New Mexico State*		Dan Law Field; Lubbock, TX	**W** 5–3	**Taylor** (2–0)	Bradley (0–2)	**Smith** (1)	1,896	11–3	—	
March 7	6:37 p.m.	New Mexico State*		Dan Law Field; Lubbock, TX	**W** 15–2	**Moreno** (1–2)	Conrad (1–1)	—	2,508	12–3	—	
March 8	2:00 p.m.	New Mexico State*		Dan Law Field; Lubbock, TX	**W** 8–7 (12)	**Brown** (1–0)	Freeman (1–2)	—	1,336	13–3	—	
March 9	12:00 p.m.	New Mexico State*		Dan Law Field; Lubbock, TX	**W** 14–4	**Drozd** (1–0)	Kilgore (2–1)	**Damron** (1)	2,453	14–3	—	
March 11	6:30 p.m.	Abilene Christian*	No. 26	Dan Law Field; Lubbock, TX	**W** 6–2 (7)	**Dusek** (2–0)	Taylor (1–3)	—	2,362	15–3	—	
March 14	6:35 p.m.	at Baylor	No. 26	Baylor Ballpark; Waco, TX	**L** 0–1	Newman (2–1)	**Moreno** (1–3)	Michalec (7)	2,810	15–4	0–1	
March 15	12:02 p.m.	at Baylor	No. 26	Baylor Ballpark; Waco, TX	**L** 1–2	Kuntz (3–0)	**Sadberry** (2–1)	Michalec (8)	2,571	15–5	0–2	
March 16	1:05 p.m.	at Baylor	No. 26	Baylor Ballpark; Waco, TX	**W** 7–1	**Taylor** (3–0)	Tolson (0–4)	—	2,424	16–5	1–2	
March 18	9:05 p.m.	Stephen F. Austin*		Dan Law Field; Lubbock, TX	**W** 20–4	**Withrow** (2–1)	Ledet (0–1)	—	1,704	17–5	—	
March 19	2:00 p.m.	Stephen F. Austin*		Dan Law Field; Lubbock, TX	**L** 3–6	Mangham (3–2)	**Tripp** (0–1)	Wiedenfield (2)	1,819	17–6	—	
March 21	6:30 p.m.	at No. 27 TCU		Lupton Stadium; Fort Worth, TX	**L** 0–9	Finnegan (4–2)	**Moreno** (1–4)	—	4,242	17–7	1–3	
March 22	4:00 p.m.	at No. 27 TCU		Lupton Stadium; Fort Worth, TX	**W** 10–2	**Drozd** (2–0)	Morrison (2–3)	—	4,028	18–7	2–3	
March 23	1:00 p.m.	at No. 27 TCU		Lupton Stadium; Fort Worth, TX	**W** 12–2	**Sadberry** (3–1)	Alexander (3–2)	—	3,548	19–7	3–3	
March 25	4:00 p.m.	Arkansas–Pine Bluff*		Dan Law Field; Lubbock, TX	**W** 2–0	**Withrow** (3–1)	Ploeger (1–2)	**Brown** (1)		20–7	—	
March 25	6:30 p.m.	Arkansas–Pine Bluff*		Dan Law Field; Lubbock, TX	**W** 5–1	**Dusek** (3–0)	Olson (1–2)	—	1,643	21–7	—	
March 28	6:37 p.m.	No. 15 Texas		Dan Law Field; Lubbock, TX	**L** 1–11	French (4–2)	**Moreno** (1–5)	—	4,206	21–8	3–4	
March 29	2:00 p.m.	No. 15 Texas		Dan Law Field; Lubbock, TX	**W** 8–4	**Drozd** (3–0)	Peters (3–2)	—	4,353	22–8	4–4	
March 30	2:07 p.m.	No. 15 Texas		Dan Law Field; Lubbock, TX	**L** 2–5 (12)	Curtiss (1–0)	**Withrow** (3–2)	—	3,992	22–9	4–5	

April: 14–4
Date	Time	Opponent	Rank	Site/stadium	Score	Win	Loss	Save	Attendance	Overall	Big 12	Ref
April 1	6:00 p.m.	vs. New Mexico*		Security Bank Ballpark; Midland, TX	**W** 6–3	**Dusek** (4–0)	Gibson (0–1)	**Moseley** (3)	5,169	23–9	—	
April 4	7:00 p.m.	at Oklahoma State		Allie P. Reynolds Stadium; Stillwater, OK	**L** 1–3	Perrin (3–2)	**Withrow** (3–3)	McCurry (6)	508	23–10	4–6	
April 5	3:00 p.m.	at Oklahoma State		Allie P. Reynolds Stadium; Stillwater, OK	**W** 16–6	**Taylor** (4–0)	Buffett (2–1)	—	3,956	24–10	5–6	
April 6	1:00 p.m.	at Oklahoma State		Allie P. Reynolds Stadium; Stillwater, OK	**L** 3–8	Wheeland (2–0)	**Moseley** (0–1)	McCurry (7)	412	24–11	5–7	
April 8	6:30 p.m.	Abilene Christian*		Dan Law Field; Lubbock, TX	**W** 19–2	**Brown** (2–0)	Gawrieh (0–1)	—	1,853	25–11	—	
April 11	6:30 p.m.	Kansas State		Dan Law Field; Lubbock, TX	**W** 4–3	**Smith** (5–0)	MaVorhis (4–4)	**Drozd** (3)	2,709	26–11	6–7	
April 12	3:00 p.m.	Kansas State		Dan Law Field; Lubbock, TX	**W** 7–4	**Taylor** (5–0)	Whaley (1–2)	—	2,768	27–11	7–7	
April 13	1:07 p.m.	Kansas State		Dan Law Field; Lubbock, TX	**W** 11–7	**Drozd** (4–0)	Griep (3–2)	—	2,145	28–11	8–7	
April 15	2:00 p.m.	Dallas Baptist*		Dan Law Field; Lubbock, TX	**W** 5–4	**Moreno** (2–5)	Shaw (2–2)	—	1,605	29–11	—	
April 17	6:30 p.m.	Prairie View A&M*		Dan Law Field; Lubbock, TX	**W** 4–3	**Moseley** (1–1)	Mata (3–6)	**Moreno** (1)	1,732	30–11	—	
April 18	6:37 p.m.	Prairie View A&M*		Dan Law Field; Lubbock, TX	**W** 8–0	**Dusek** (5–0)	Helms (2–5)	—	2,036	31–11	—	
April 19	1:00 p.m.	Prairie View A&M*		Dan Law Field; Lubbock, TX	**W** 13–0 (7)	**Damron** (2–0)	Flick (1–4)	—	1,916	32–11	—	
April 21	3:00 p.m.	at No. 24 New Mexico*		Lobo Field; Albuquerque, NM	**L** 3–4	Sanchez (3–0)	**Smith** (5–1)	—	722	32–12	—	
April 22	6:00 p.m.	vs. No. 15 TCU*		Crutcher Scott Field; Abilene, TX	**L** 0–4	Kipper (6–2)	**Taylor** (5–1)	—	1,437	32–13	—	
April 25	6:37 p.m.	Oklahoma		Dan Law Field; Lubbock, TX	**W**9–5	**Drozd** (5–0)	Choplick (3–3)	**Taylor** (1)	3,216	33–13	9–7	
April 26	12:00 p.m.	Oklahoma		Dan Law Field; Lubbock, TX	**W** 14–4	**Sadberry** (4–1)	Evans (3–3)	—	2,582	34–13	10–7	
April 27	2:07 p.m.	Oklahoma		Dan Law Field; Lubbock, TX	**W** 14–4 (7)	**Moreno** (3–5)	Garza (5–2)	—	2,106	35–13	11–7	
April 29	6:00 p.m.	at Oral Roberts*	No. 21	J. L. Johnson Stadium; Tulsa, OK	**W** 4–1 (12)	**Moreno** (4–5)	McDavid (1–1)	—	598	36–13	—	

May: 4–3
Date	Time	Opponent	Rank	Site/stadium	Score	Win	Loss	Save	Attendance	Overall	Big 12	Ref
May 2	6:00 p.m.	at Kansas	No. 21	Hoglund Ballpark; Lawrence, KS	**L** 3–11	Piche' (6–5)	**Moseley** (1–2)	—	1,100	36–14	11–8	
May 3	2:00 p.m.	at Kansas	No. 21	Hoglund Ballpark; Lawrence, KS	**L** 4–6	Morovick (7–2)	**Sadberry** (4–2)	Villines (6)	1,277	36–15	11–9	
May 4	1:00 p.m.	at Kansas	No. 21	Hoglund Ballpark; Lawremce, KS	**L** 1–4	Duncan (6–2)	**Taylor** (5–2)	—	1,167	36–16	11–10	
May 6	2:00 p.m.	at Dallas Baptist*	No. 27	Horner Ballpark; Dallas, TX	**W** 18–3	**Drozd** (6–0)	Shaw (3–3)	—	753	37–16	—	
May 15	6:37 p.m.	West Virginia	No. 27	Dan Law Field; Lubbock, TX	**W** 4–3 (11)	**Smith** (6–1)	Carley (5–3)	—	2,147	38–16	12–10	
May 16	6:30 p.m.	West Virginia	No. 27	Dan Law Field; Lubbock, TX	**W** 3–2	**Smith** (7–1)	Vance (3–3)	—	2,399	39–16	13–10	
May 17	2:05 p.m.	West Virginia	No. 27	Dan Law Field; Lubbock, TX	**W** 4–0	**Dusek** (6–0)	Means (6–2)	**Moreno** (2)	2,509	40–16	14–10	

Post–season: 5–5

Big 12 Tournament: 0–2
Date	Time	Opponent	Rank	Site/stadium	Score	Win	Loss	Save	Attendance	Overall	B12T	Ref
May 21	7:30 p.m.	vs. (5) No. 28 Texas	(4) No. 27	Chickasaw Bricktown Ballpark; Oklahoma City, OK	**L** 3–8	Schiraldi (7–3)	**Taylor** (5–3)	Hollingsworth (2)	5,947	40–17	0–1	
May 22	12:30 p.m.	vs. (8) Oklahoma	(4) No. 27	Chickasaw Bricktown Ballpark; Oklahoma City, OK	**L** 8–9	Ladd (5–3)	**Smith** (7–2)	—	3,825	40–18	0–2	

Coral Gables Regional: 3–1
Date	Time	Opponent	Rank	Site/stadium	Score	Win	Loss	Save	Attendance	Overall	NCAAT	Ref
May 30	1:00 p.m.	vs. (3) Columbia	(2)	Alex Rodriguez Park at Mark Light Field; Coral Gables, FL	**W** 3–2	**Drozd** (7–0)	Crispi (3–2)	—	1,843	41–18	1–0	
May 31	6:00 p.m.	vs. (1) No. 3 Miami (FL)	(2)	Mark Light Field; Coral Gables, FL	**W** 3–0	**Dusek** (7–0)	Diaz (9–1)	**Taylor** (2)	2,350	42–18	2–0	
June 1	6:00 p.m.	vs. (1) No. 3 Miami (FL)	(2)	Mark Light Field; Coral Gables, FL	**Suspended due to weather; resume June 2**							
June 2	1:00 p.m.	vs. (1) No. 3 Miami (FL)	(2)	Mark Light Field; Coral Gables, FL	**L** 1–2 (10)	Garcia (7–4)	**Sadberry** (4–3)	—	2,050	42–19	2–1	
June 2	3:10 p.m.	vs. (1) No. 3 Miami (FL)	(2)	Mark Light Field; Coral Gables, FL	**W** 4–0	**Smith** (5–2)	Hammond (5–2)	—	2,050	43–19	3–1	

Lubbock Super Regional: 2–0
Date	Time	Opponent	Rank	Site/stadium	Score	Win	Loss	Save	Attendance	Overall	NCAAT	Ref
June 7	12:00 p.m.	vs. No. 16 Charleston	No. 10	Dan Law Field; Lubbock, TX	**W** 1–0	**Sadberry** (5–3)	Clarke (10–4)	**Drozd** (4)	4,811	44–19	4–1	
June 8	3:30 p.m.	vs. No. 16 Charleston	No. 10	Dan Law Field; Lubbock, TX	**W** 1–0	**Dusek** (8–0)	Ober (10–3)	**Drozd** (5)	4,811	45–19	5–1	

College World Series: 0–2
Date	Time	Opponent	Rank	Site/stadium	Score	Win	Loss	Save	Attendance	Overall	CWS	Ref
June 15	2:00 p.m.	vs. (7) No. 2 TCU	No. 7	TD Ameritrade Park; Omaham, NE	**L** 2–3	Ferrell (3–2)	**Drozd** (7–1)	—	24,587	45–20	0–1	World Series_Opener.aspx
June 17	2:00 p.m.	vs. No. 4 Ole Miss	No. 7	TD Ameritrade Park; Omaha, NE	**L** 1–2	Weathersby (4–1)	**Smith** (8–3)	—	18,828	45–21	0–2	

Legend: = Win = Loss = Postponement
Bold = Texas Tech team member

"*" indicates a non-conference game.
"#" represents ranking. All rankings from Collegiate Baseball on the date of the contest.
"()" represents postseason seeding in the Big 12 Tournament or NCAA Regional, respectively.

== Ranking movements ==
Ranking movements Legend: ██ Increase in ranking ██ Decrease in ranking — = Not ranked RV = Received votes т = Tied with team above or below
	Week																		
Poll	Pre	1	2	3	4	5	6	7	8	9	10	11	12	13	14	15	16	17	Final
Coaches'	—	—*	—*	RV	23	25	24	25	24	24	21	19	23	23	21	23	23*	23*	8^{T}
Baseball America	—	—	—	—	—	—	—	—	—	—	—	21	—	—	23	—	—*	—*	9
Collegiate Baseball^	—	30	26	—	26	—	—	—	—	—	—	21	27	27	27	—	10	7	8
NCBWA†	—	28	26	30	25	29	27	26	30	25	23	21	24	23	22	23	10	10*	8

^ Collegiate Baseball ranked 40 teams in their preseason poll, but only ranked 30 teams weekly during the season.
† NCBWA ranks 30 teams in their preseason poll, but only ranks 25 teams weekly during the season.
* A new poll was not released for this week, so for comparison purposes, the previous week's ranking is inserted in this week's slot.
