= 2014 Baylor Bears baseball team =

American college baseball season

2014 Baylor Bears baseball
- Conference: Big 12 Conference
- Record: 15–17 (4–7 Big 12)
- Head coach: Steve Smith (20th season)
- Home stadium: Baylor Ballpark

2014 Big 12 Conference baseball standings
	Conf.				Overall
Team	W		L	PCT	W		L	PCT
No. 10 Oklahoma State ‍†‍‍^{y}	18	–	6	.750	48	–	18	.727
No. 5 TCU ‍‍‡‍^{y}	17	–	7	.708	48	–	18	.727
Kansas ‍‍‍^{y}	15	–	9	.625	35	–	26	.574
No. 8 Texas Tech ‍‍‍^{y}	14	–	10	.583	45	–	21	.682
No. 3 Texas ‍‍‍^{y}	13	–	11	.542	46	–	21	.687
West Virginia ‍‍‍	9	–	14	.391	28	–	26	.519
Baylor ‍‍‍	8	–	15	.348	26	–	31	.456
Oklahoma ‍‍‍	8	–	16	.333	29	–	29	.500
Kansas State ‍‍‍	5	–	19	.208	25	–	30	.455
† – Conference champion ‡ – Tournament champion y – Invited to the NCAA tournament Rankings from Collegiate Baseball

The 2014 Baylor Bears baseball team represented Baylor University in the 2014 college baseball season. Baylor competed in Division I of the National Collegiate Athletic Association (NCAA) as a charter member of the Big 12 Conference. The Bears played home games at Baylor Ballpark on the university's campus in Waco, Texas. Twenty year head coach Steve Smith led the Bears.

== Personnel ==
=== Coaches ===
2014 Baylor Bears baseball coaching staff
No.	Name	Position	Tenure	Alma mater
34	Steve Smith	Head coach	20th season	Baylor University
14	Steve Johnigan	Associate Head Coach	19th season	Texas A&M University
42	Trevor Mote	Assistant coach	6th season	Baylor University
40	Adam Revelette	Volunteer Assistant Coach	2nd Season	University of Kentucky

== Schedule ==
2014 Baylor Bears baseball team game log
Date	Time	Opponent^{#}	Rank^{#}	Site/Event	TV	Win	Loss	Save	Result	Attd.	Record
February 14	3:30 PM	at #22 Arizona State		Packard Stadium • Tempe, AZ	P12N	Daniel Castano (1–0)	Nick Diamond (0–1)	Josh Michalec (1)	W 0–1	2,437	1–0
February 15	2:00 PM	at #22 Arizona State		Packard Stadium • Tempe, AZ		Eric Melbostad (1–0)	Sean Spicer (0–1)		L 4–7	2,470	1–1
February 16	1:30 PM	at #22 Arizona State		Packard Stadium • Tempe, AZ		Zak Miller (1–0)	Drew Tolson (0–1)		L 1–12	2,640	1–2
February 18	1:30 PM	UT Arlington		Baylor Ballpark • Waco, TX		Doug Ashby (1–0)	Brad Vachon (0–2)	Josh Michalec (2)	W 5–2	2,446	2–2
February 21	6:35 PM	Austin Peay		Baylor Ballpark • Waco, TX		Dillon Newman (1–0)	Zach Hall (0–2)	Josh Michalec (3)	W 5–2	2,412	3–2
February 22	3:05 PM	Austin Peay		Baylor Ballpark • Waco, TX		Brad Kuntz (1–0)	Alex Robles (0–1)		W 15–1	2,685	4–2
February 23	1:05 PM	Austin Peay		Baylor Ballpark • Waco, TX		Austin Stone(1–0)	Ryan Quick (0–1)		W 12–1^{(7 INN)}	2,316	5–2
February 25	6:35 PM	Incarnate Word		Baylor Ballpark • Waco, TX		Postponed (weather). Makeup: April 2					
February 26	6:35 PM	Texas A&M–Corpus Christi		Baylor Ballpark • Waco, TX		Postponed (weather). Makeup: April 30					
February 28	1:00 PM	vs. California		Fowler Park • San Diego, CA (USD Tournament)		Postponed (weather). Makeup: March 1					
February 28	5:00 PM	at San Diego		Fowler Park • San Diego, CA (USD Tournament)		Postponed (weather). Makeup: March 2					
March 1	3:08 PM	vs. California		Fowler Park • San Diego, CA (USD Tournament)		Dylan Nelson (1–0)	Doug Ashby (1–1)	Trevor Hildenberger (2)	L 5–8	203	5–3
March 1	7:00 PM	vs. UNC Wilmington		Fowler Park • San Diego, CA (USD Tournament)		Postponed (weather). Makeup: March 2					
March 2	4:05 PM	vs. UNC Wilmington		Fowler Park • San Diego, CA (USD Tournament)		Kelly Secrest (2–1)	Josh Michalec (0–1)		L 3–5	303	5–4
March 2	8:31 PM	at San Diego		Fowler Park • San Diego, CA (USD Tournament)		Troy Conyers (1–0)	Austin Stone (1–1)		L 0–8	315	5–5
March 3	1:02 PM	vs. California		Fowler Park • San Diego, CA (USD Tournament)		Ryan Mason (2–0)	Drew Tolson (1–1)	Trevor Hildenberger (3)	L 3–5	75	5–6
March 5	4:05 PM	Lamar		Baylor Ballpark • Waco, TX		Nick Lewis (1–0)	Jayson McKinley (1–1)	Josh Michalec (4)	W 3–2	1,922	6–6
March 7	6:35 PM	#3 Cal State Fullerton		Baylor Ballpark • Waco, TX		Thomas Eshelman (3–0)	Dillon Newman (1–1)		L0–11	2,471	6–7
March 8	3:05 PM	#3 Cal State Fullerton		Baylor Ballpark • Waco, TX		Brad Kuntz (2–0)	Justin Garza (2–1)	Josh Michalec (5)	W 1–0	2,326	7–7
March 9	1:05 PM	#3 Cal State Fullerton		Baylor Ballpark • Waco, TX	FSSW	Austin Stone (2–1)	Grahamm Wiest (1–1)	Josh Michalec (6)	W 5–4	2,195	8–7
March 11	6:35 PM	at Houston		Cougar Field • Houston, TX		Andrew Lantrip (1–0)	Drew Tolson (0–3)		L 2–7	2,012	8–8
March 14	6:37 PM	#26 Texas Tech*		Baylor Ballpark • Waco, TX	FCS	Dillon Newman (2–1)	Dominic Moreno (1–3)	Josh Michalec (7)	W 1–0	2,810	9–8
March 15	12:02 PM	#26 Texas Tech*		Baylor Ballpark • Waco, TX	FS1	Brad Kuntz (3–0)	Chris Sadberry (2–1)	Josh Michalec (8)	W 2–1	2,571	10–8
March 16	1:07 PM	#26 Texas Tech*		Baylor Ballpark • Waco, TX	FSSW	Corey Taylor (3–0)	Drew Tolson (0–4)		L 1–7	2,424	10–9
March 18	6:35 PM	Houston Baptist		Baylor Ballpark • Waco, TX		Daniel Castano (2–0)	Ross Kennell (0–3)		W 9–3	2,202	11–9
March 21	6:37 PM	#20 Oklahoma State*		Baylor Ballpark • Waco, TX	FCS	Brad Kuntz (4–0)	Jon Perrin (2–1)	Josh Michalec (9)	W 4–1	3,115	12–9
March 22	2:07 PM	#20 Oklahoma State*		Baylor Ballpark • Waco, TX	FCS	Austin Stone (3–1)	Mark Robinette (1–2)		W 4–1	3,195	13–9
March 23	1:07 PM	#20 Oklahoma State*		Baylor Ballpark • Waco, TX	FSSW+	Tyler Buffett (2–0)	Daniel Castano (2–1)	Garrett Williams (1)	L 1–4	2,319	13–10
March 25	6:30 PM	at UT Arlington	#29	Clay Gould Ballpark • Arlington, TX		Daniel Milliman (2–0)	Ryan Smith (0–1)		L 3–14	660	13–11
March 28	2:06 PM	at West Virginia*	#29	Appalachian Power Park • Charleston, WV		Michael Bennett (1–0)	Josh Michalec (0–2)		L 7–8	787	13–12
March 29	3:00 PM	at West Virginia*	#29	Appalachian Power Park • Charleston, WV		Cancelled (weather).					
March 30	12:30 PM	at West Virginia*	#29	Appalachian Power Park • Charleston, WV	FS2	Sean Carley (5–0)	Austin Stone (3–2)		L 1–4	1,028	13–13
April 1	6:35 PM	Incarnate Word		Baylor Ballpark • Waco, TX		Dillon Newman (3–1)	Cody Richey (0–2)	Josh Michalec (10)	W 5–2	2,263	14–13
April 2	4:05 PM	Incarnate Word		Baylor Ballpark • Waco, TX		Daniel Castano (3–1)	Chris Jones (0–1)	Josh Michalec (11)	W 4–3	2,003	15–13
April 4	7:05 PM	at #9 Texas*		UFCU Disch–Falk Field • Austin, TX	LHN	Travis Duke (2–0)	Josh Michalec (0–3)		L 4–5	5,868	15–14
April 5	7:02 PM	at #9 Texas*		UFCU Disch–Falk Field • Austin, TX	LHN	Dillon Peters (4–2)	Austin Stone (3–3)	Morgan Cooper (3)	L 3–6	6,854	15–15
April 6	2:46 PM	at #9 Texas*		UFCU Disch–Falk Field • Austin, TX	LHN	Nathan Thornhill (5–0)	Dillon Newman (3–2)		L 0–4	5,597	15–16
April 8	6:30 PM	at Sam Houston State		Don Sanders Stadium • Huntsville, TX		Ryan Brinley (3–2)	Sean Spicer (0–1)	Alan Scott (3)	L 3–4	1,336	15–17
April 11	6:30 PM	at Dallas Baptist		Horner Ballpark • Dallas, TX							
April 12	3:05 PM	Dallas Baptist		Baylor Ballpark • Waco, TX							
April 12	7:30 PM	Dallas Baptist		Baylor Ballpark • Waco, TX							
April 15	6:35 PM	Texas Southern		Baylor Ballpark • Waco, TX							
April 17	6:30 PM	at Kansas State*		Tointon Family Stadium • Manhattan, KS							
April 18	6:30 PM	at Kansas State*		Tointon Family Stadium • Manhattan, KS							
April 19	7:00 PM	at Kansas State*		Tointon Family Stadium • Manhattan, KS	ESPNU						
April 22	6:35 PM	Texas State		Baylor Ballpark • Waco, TX							
April 23	6:30 PM	at Texas State		Bobcat Ballpark • San Marcos, TX							
April 25	6:35 PM	Kansas*		Baylor Ballpark • Waco, TX	FSSW+						
April 26	3:05 PM	Kansas*		Baylor Ballpark • Waco, TX	FSSW+						
April 27	1:05 PM	Kansas*		Baylor Ballpark • Waco, TX	FCS						
April 29	6:35 PM	Sam Houston State		Baylor Ballpark • Waco, TX	FCS						
April 30	6:35 PM	Texas A&M–Corpus Christi		Baylor Ballpark • Waco, TX							
May 2	6:00 PM	at Oklahoma*		L. Dale Mitchell Baseball Park • Norman, OK	FSN						
May 3	2:00 PM	at Oklahoma*		L. Dale Mitchell Baseball Park • Norman, OK	FSN						
May 4	1:00 PM	at Oklahoma*		L. Dale Mitchell Baseball Park • Norman, OK	FSN						
May 13	1:00 PM	UTSA		Baylor Ballpark • Waco, TX							
May 15	6:35 PM	TCU*		Baylor Ballpark • Waco, TX	FSSW						
May 16	6:35 PM	TCU*		Baylor Ballpark • Waco, TX	FSSW						
May 17	6:35 PM	TCU*		Baylor Ballpark • Waco, TX	FSSW+						
*Big 12 Conference game. ^{#}Rankings from Collegiate Baseball released prior to game. All times are in Central Time.

== Ranking movements ==
Ranking movements Legend: ██ Increase in ranking ██ Decrease in ranking — = Not ranked RV = Received votes
	Week																		
Poll	Pre	1	2	3	4	5	6	7	8	9	10	11	12	13	14	15	16	17	Final
Coaches'	RV	RV*	—	RV	—	RV	RV	—	—										
Baseball America	—	—	—	—	—	—	—	—	—										
Collegiate Baseball^	—	—	—	—	—	—	29	—	—										
NCBWA†	—	—	—	—	—	RV	—	—	—										

^ Collegiate Baseball ranked 40 teams in their preseason poll, but only ranked 30 teams weekly during the season.
† NCBWA ranks 30 teams in their preseason poll, but only ranks 25 teams weekly during the season.
* A new poll was not released for this week, so for comparison purposes, the previous week's ranking is inserted in this week's slot.
