= 2014 Texas Longhorns baseball team =

American college baseball season

2014 Texas Longhorns baseball

Houston Regional champions Austin Super Regional champions

College World Series, Semifinals (3–2)
- Conference: Big 12 Conference

Ranking
- Coaches: No. 3
- CB: No. 3
- Record: 46–21 (13–11 Big 12)
- Head coach: Augie Garrido (18th season)
- Hitting coach: Tommy Nicholson (2nd season)
- Pitching coach: Skip Johnson (8th season)
- Home stadium: UFCU Disch–Falk Field

2014 Big 12 Conference baseball standings
| | Conf. | | | | Overall |
| Team | W | | L | PCT | W | | L | PCT |
|---|---|---|---|---|---|---|---|---|
| No. 10 Oklahoma State ‍†‍‍^{y} | 18 | – | 6 | .750 | 48 | – | 18 | .727 |
| No. 5 TCU ‍‍‡‍^{y} | 17 | – | 7 | .708 | 48 | – | 18 | .727 |
| Kansas ‍‍‍^{y} | 15 | – | 9 | .625 | 35 | – | 26 | .574 |
| No. 8 Texas Tech ‍‍‍^{y} | 14 | – | 10 | .583 | 45 | – | 21 | .682 |
| No. 3 Texas ‍‍‍^{y} | 13 | – | 11 | .542 | 46 | – | 21 | .687 |
| West Virginia ‍‍‍ | 9 | – | 14 | .391 | 28 | – | 26 | .519 |
| Baylor ‍‍‍ | 8 | – | 15 | .348 | 26 | – | 31 | .456 |
| Oklahoma ‍‍‍ | 8 | – | 16 | .333 | 29 | – | 29 | .500 |
| Kansas State ‍‍‍ | 5 | – | 19 | .208 | 25 | – | 30 | .455 |
† – Conference champion ‡ – Tournament champion y – Invited to the NCAA tournament Rankings from Collegiate Baseball

The 2014 Texas Longhorns baseball team represented the University of Texas at Austin in the 2014 college baseball season. Texas competed in Division I of the National Collegiate Athletic Association (NCAA) as a member of the Big 12 Conference. The Longhorns played their home games at UFCU Disch–Falk Field on the university's campus in Austin, Texas. Augie Garrido led the Longhorns in his eighteenth season as head coach.

== Roster ==
2014 Texas Longhorns baseball team
Players
Coaches

| # | Pos. | Name | B/T | Height | Weight | Year | Previous school | Home town |
|---|---|---|---|---|---|---|---|---|
| 1 | C | Tres Barrera | R/R | 6 ft 0 in (1.83 m) | 211 lb (96 kg) | Fr | Mission Sharyland | Eagle Pass, TX |
| 2 | OF | Mark Payton | L/L | 5 ft 8 in (1.73 m) | 190 lb (86 kg) | Sr | St. Rita | Chicago, IL |
| 4 | OF | Collin Shaw | L/L | 6 ft 0 in (1.83 m) | 199 lb (90 kg) | Jr | Westlake | Austin, TX |
| 5 | INF | Andy McGuire | R/R | 6 ft 1 in (1.85 m) | 200 lb (91 kg) | Fr | James Madison | Oakton, VA |
| 6 | INF | Connor Macalla | L/R | 6 ft 0 in (1.83 m) | 170 lb (77 kg) | Fr | Langham Creek | Houston, TX |
| 7 | OF | Weston Hall | R/R | 6 ft 0 in (1.83 m) | 202 lb (92 kg) | Sr | Leander | Cedar Park, TX |
| 8 | INF | Brooks Marlow | L/R | 5 ft 8 in (1.73 m) | 184 lb (83 kg) | Jr | Giddings | Giddings, TX |
| 9 | INF | C.J. Hinojosa | R/R | 5 ft 11 in (1.8 m) | 179 lb (81 kg) | So | Klein Collins | Spring, TX |
| 11 | INF | Alex Silver | R/R | 6 ft 1 in (1.85 m) | 205 lb (93 kg) | Sr | Bellaire | Houston, TX |
| 12 | C | Jacob Felts | R/R | 6 ft 0 in (1.83 m) | 200 lb (91 kg) | Sr | Orangefield | Orange, TX |
| 14 | OF | Ben Johnson | R/R | 6 ft 1 in (1.85 m) | 191 lb (87 kg) | So | Westwood | Austin, TX |
| 15 | RHP | Justin Peters | R/R | 6 ft 4 in (1.93 m) | 195 lb (88 kg) | RS Jr | Deer Park | Deer Park, TX |
| 17 | INF | Bret Boswell | L/R | 5 ft 11 in (1.8 m) | 177 lb (80 kg) | Fr | Rockwall-Heath | Rockwall, TX |
| 24 | RHP | Parker French | L/R | 6 ft 2 in (1.88 m) | 218 lb (99 kg) | Jr | Dripping Springs | Dripping Springs, TX |
| 27 | LHP | Travis Duke | L/L | 6 ft 3 in (1.91 m) | 210 lb (95 kg) | So | Dawson | Pearland, TX |
| 28 | RHP | Blake Goins | R/R | 5 ft 11 in (1.8 m) | 205 lb (93 kg) | Fr | Pearland | Pearland, TX |
| 29 | LHP | Jon Malmin | L/L | 6 ft 8 in (2.03 m) | 180 lb (82 kg) | Fr | Troy | Troy, TX |
| 30 | LHP | Josh Sawyer | L/L | 6 ft 2 in (1.88 m) | 190 lb (86 kg) | Fr | San Angelo Central | San Angelo, TX |
| 31 | RHP | Chad Hollingsworth | R/R | 6 ft 2 in (1.88 m) | 210 lb (95 kg) | So | Robinson | Waco, TX |
| 32 | LHP | Dillon Peters | L/L | 5 ft 11 in (1.8 m) | 212 lb (96 kg) | Jr | Cathedral | Indianapolis, IN |
| 33 | C | Jeremy Montalbano | R/R | 6 ft 1 in (1.85 m) | 201 lb (91 kg) | So | Seven Lakes | Katy, TX |
| 34 | RHP | Lukas Schiraldi | R/R | 6 ft 4 in (1.93 m) | 205 lb (93 kg) | Jr | St. Michaels | Austin, TX |
| 35 | INF | Madison Carter | R/R | 5 ft 10 in (1.78 m) | 179 lb (81 kg) | Sr | Sherman | Sherman, TX |
| 36 | RHP | Nathan Thornhill | R/R | 6 ft 0 in (1.83 m) | 182 lb (83 kg) | Sr | Cedar Park | Cedar Park, TX |
| 38 | LHP | Ty Culbreth | L/L | 5 ft 10 in (1.78 m) | 181 lb (82 kg) | So | Bryan | Bryan, TX |
| 39 | RHP | James Swan | R/R | 6 ft 5 in (1.96 m) | 180 lb (82 kg) | Fr | Little Cypress-Mauriceville | Orange, TX |
| 40 | | Taylor Stell | R/R | 6 ft 4 in (1.93 m) | 202 lb (92 kg) | Jr | Lake Highlands | Dallas, TX |
| 41 | RHP | Morgan Cooper | R/R | 6 ft 5 in (1.96 m) | 211 lb (96 kg) | Fr | Jarrell | Jarrell, TX |
| 42 | | Kacey Clemens | L/R | 6 ft 1 in (1.85 m) | 203 lb (92 kg) | Fr | Memorial | Houston, TX |
| 43 | RHP | John Curtiss | R/R | 6 ft 4 in (1.93 m) | 210 lb (95 kg) | RS So | Southlake Carroll | Southlake, TX |
| 45 | C | Grant Martin | R/R | 5 ft 9 in (1.75 m) | 167 lb (76 kg) | Jr | Burnet | Burnet, TX |
| 46 | C | James Barton | L/R | 5 ft 10 in (1.78 m) | 184 lb (83 kg) | So | Hyde Park Baptist | Austin, TX |
| 47 | | Ben Kennedy | L/R | 5 ft 10 in (1.78 m) | 195 lb (88 kg) | Fr | A&M Consolidated | College Station, TX |
| 48 | | Ty Marlow | R/R | 5 ft 10 in (1.78 m) | 189 lb (86 kg) | Sr | Giddings | Giddings, TX |
| 50 | | Zane Gurwitz | R/R | 5 ft 8 in (1.73 m) | 175 lb (79 kg) | Fr | Churchill | San Antonio, TX |

Head coach

Augie Garrido (Fresno State)

Assistant coach(es)

Tommy Nicholson (Texas)
Ryan Russ- Volunteer (Texas)

Pitching coach(es)

Skip Johnson (UT Pan American)

Legend

- (C) Team captain
- (S) Suspended
- (I) Ineligible
- Injured
- Current redshirt

Roster
Last update: May 8, 2014

== Schedule ==
2014 Texas Longhorns baseball game log: 46–21
Regular season: 36–16

February: 7–3
| Date | Time | Opponent | Rank | Site/stadium | Result | Win | Loss | Save | Attendance | Overall | Big 12 |
|---|---|---|---|---|---|---|---|---|---|---|---|
| February 14 | 9:04 PM | at California | No. 20 | Evans Diamond • Berkeley, CA | L 0–7 | Jefferies (1–0) | French (0–1) | — | 825 | 0–1 | — |
| February 15 | 3:03 PM | at California | No. 20 | Evans Diamond • Berkeley, CA | L 1–2 | Mason (1–0) | Peters (0–1) | — | 831 | 0–2 | — |
| February 15 | 6:13 PM | at California | No. 20 | Evans Diamond • Berkeley, CA | W 6–2 | Schiraldi (1–0) | Schick (0–1) | — | 913 | 1–2 | — |
| February 16 | 3:03 PM | at California | No. 20 | Evans Diamond • Berkeley, CA | W 5–0 | Thornhill (1–0) | Theofanopoulos (0–1) | — | 1,231 | 2–2 | — |
| February 18 | 6:05 PM | Texas A&M–Corpus Christi | No. 25 | UFCU Disch–Falk Field • Austin, TX | W 10–0 (8) | Sawyer (1–0) | Belicek (0–1) | — | 4,901 | 3–2 | — |
| February 21 | 6:05 PM | Stanford | No. 25 | UFCU Disch–Falk Field • Austin, TX | W 9–3 | French (1–1) | Quantrill (0–2) | — | 5,929 | 4–2 | — |
| February 22 | 2:05 PM | Stanford | No. 25 | UFCU Disch–Falk Field • Austin, TX | W 4–3 | Thornhill (2–0) | Brakeman (0–1) | — | 7,044 | 5–2 | — |
| February 23 | 1:05 PM | Stanford | No. 25 | UFCU Disch–Falk Field • Austin, TX | L 5–11^{(8)} | Hochstatter (1–1) | Schiraldi (1–1) | — | 6,437 | 5–3 | — |
| February 25 | 4:30 PM | UT Pan American | No. 24 | UFCU Disch–Falk Field • Austin, TX | W 2–1^{(11)} | Thornhill (3–0) | Landon (0–1) | — | 4,598 | 6–3 | — |
| February 28 | 7:05 PM | vs. No. 15 Rice | No. 24 | Minute Maid Park • Houston, TX (Houston College Classic) | W 2–0 | Peters (1–0) | McDowell (0–1) | Thornhill (1) | N/A | 7–3 | — |

March: 15–4
| Date | Time | Opponent | Rank | Site/stadium | Score | Win | Loss | Save | Attendance | Overall | Big 12 |
|---|---|---|---|---|---|---|---|---|---|---|---|
| March 1 | 4:05 PM | vs. Houston | No. 24 | Minute Maid Park • Houston, TX (Houston College Classic) | W 3–2 | French (2–1) | Lemoine (1–1) | Thornhill (2) | N/A | 8–3 | — |
| March 2 | 10:05 AM | vs. Sam Houston State | No. 24 | Minute Maid Park • Houston, TX (Houston College Classic) | W 3–2 | Cooper (1–0) | Simms (0–1) | — | N/A | 9–3 | — |
| March 4 | 6:04 PM | Valparaiso | No. 17 | UFCU Disch–Falk Field • Austin, TX | W 7–1 | Goins (1–0) | Lundeen (0–1) | — | 4,551 | 10–3 | — |
| March 7 | 6:06 PM | Hawaii | No. 17 | UFCU Disch–Falk Field • Austin, TX | W 3–2 | Duke (1–0) | Cooper (2–1) | Curtiss (1) | 4,915 | 11–3 | — |
| March 8 | 12:06 PM | Hawaii | No. 17 | UFCU Disch–Falk Field • Austin, TX | L 1–6 | Squier (2–0) | Peters (1–1) | — | N/A | 11–4 | — |
| March 8 | 2:53 PM | Hawaii | No. 17 | UFCU Disch–Falk Field • Austin, TX | W 3–2 | Cooper (2–0) | Gleese (0–3) | — | 5,131 | 12–4 | — |
| March 9 | 2:06 PM | Hawaii | No. 17 | UFCU Disch–Falk Field • Austin, TX | W 4–1 | Schiraldi (2–1) | Kuzminsky (1–2) | Curtiss (2) | 4,761 | 13–4 | — |
| March 11 | 6:36 PM | at Texas State | No. 14 | Bobcat Ballpark • San Marcos, TX | W 6–3 | Culbreth (1–0) | Bein (0–2) | Curtiss (3) | 2,603 | 14–4 | — |
| March 14 | 6:05 PM | Kansas* | No. 14 | UFCU Disch–Falk Field • Austin, TX | L 2–3 | Benjamin (3–0) | French (2–2) | Piche (3) | 5,639 | 14–5 | 0–1 |
| March 15 | 1:05 PM | Kansas* | No. 14 | UFCU Disch–Falk Field • Austin, TX | W 2–1 | Peters (2–1) | Kahana (1–3) | Curtiss (4) | 5,772 | 15–5 | 1–1 |
| March 16 | 1:05 PM | Kansas* | No. 14 | UFCU Disch–Falk Field • Austin, TX | L 1–6 | Piche (3–0) | Cooper (2–1) | — | 5,142 | 15–6 | 1–2 |
| March 18 | 6:05 PM | Dallas Baptist | No. 19 | UFCU Disch–Falk Field • Austin, TX | W 5–0 | Schiraldi (3–1) | Beam (0–1) | — | 4,813 | 16–6 | — |
| March 21 | 6:05 PM | Columbia | No. 19 | UFCU Disch–Falk Field • Austin, TX | W 7–3 | Peters (3–1) | Speer (1–2) | Cooper (1) | 4,810 | 17–6 | — |
| March 22 | 12:05 PM | Columbia | No. 19 | UFCU Disch–Falk Field • Austin, TX | W 6–1 | French (3–2) | Donino (1–2) | — | N/A | 18–6 | — |
| March 22 | 3:31 PM | Columbia | No. 19 | UFCU Disch–Falk Field • Austin, TX | W 11–0 | Thornhill (4–0) | Roy (1–2) | — | 5,489 | 19–6 | — |
| March 25 | 6:00 PM | Texas State | No. 15 | UFCU Disch–Falk Field • Austin, TX | W 5–1 | Schiraldi (4–1) | Davenport (0–2) | — | 5,163 | 20–6 | — |
| March 28 | 6:30 PM | at Texas Tech* | No. 15 | Dan Law Field at Rip Griffin Park • Lubbock, TX | W 11–1 | French (4–2) | Moreno (1–5) | — | 4,206 | 21–6 | 2–2 |
| March 29 | 2:00 PM | at Texas Tech* | No. 15 | Dan Law Field at Rip Griffin Park • Lubbock, TX | L 4–8 | Drozd (3–0) | Peters (3–2) | — | 4,353 | 21–7 | 2–3 |
| March 30 | 2:00 PM | at Texas Tech* | No. 15 | Dan Law Field at Rip Griffin Park • Lubbock, TX | W 5–2^{(12)} | Curtiss (1–0) | Withrow (3–2) | — | 3,992 | 22–7 | 3–3 |

April: 11–6
| Date | Time | Opponent | Rank | Site/stadium | Score | Win | Loss | Save | Attendance | Overall | Big 12 |
|---|---|---|---|---|---|---|---|---|---|---|---|
| April 1 | 6:30 PM | at No. 18 Rice | No. 9 | Reckling Park • Houston, TX | W 5–2 | Schiraldi (5–1) | Duplantier (0–2) | Cooper (2) | 4,778 | 23–7 | — |
| April 4 | 7:00 PM | Baylor* | No. 9 | UFCU Disch–Falk Field • Austin, TX | W 5–4 | Duke (2–0) | Michalec (0–3) | — | 5,868 | 24–7 | 4–3 |
| April 5 | 7:00 PM | Baylor* | No. 9 | UFCU Disch–Falk Field • Austin, TX | W 6–3 | Peters (4–2) | Stone (3–3) | Cooper (3) | 6,854 | 25–7 | 5–3 |
| April 6 | 2:30 PM | Baylor* | No. 9 | UFCU Disch–Falk Field • Austin, TX | W 4–0 | Thornhill (5–0) | Newman (3–2) | — | 5,597 | 26–7 | 6–3 |
| April 8 | 7:00 PM | No. 30 Rice | No. 7 | UFCU Disch–Falk Field • Austin, TX | L 2–7 | Tekyl (2–0) | Schiraldi (5–2) | — | 5,907 | 26–8 | — |
| April 11 | 6:00 PM | at No. 26 Oklahoma* | No. 7 | L. Dale Mitchell Baseball Park • Norman, OK | W 10–8^{(10)} | Cooper (3–1) | Garza (4–1) | Curtiss (5) | 2,011 | 27–8 | 7–3 |
| April 12 | 4:00 PM | at No. 26 Oklahoma* | No. 7 | L. Dale Mitchell Baseball Park • Norman, OK | W 7–2 | Peters (5–2) | Choplick (3–2) | — | 4,102 | 28–8 | 8–3 |
| April 13 | 4:00 PM | at No. 26 Oklahoma* | No. 7 | L. Dale Mitchell Baseball Park • Norman, OK | W 8–1 | Thornhill (6–0) | Evans (3–2) | — | 1,156 | 29–8 | 9–3 |
| April 15 | 6:00 PM | UT Arlington | No. 4 | UFCU Disch–Falk Field • Austin, TX | W 10–2 | Hollingsworth (1–0) | Hobbs (3–1) | — | 5,083 | 30–8 | — |
| April 17 | 6:00 PM | TCU* | No. 4 | UFCU Disch–Falk Field • Austin, TX | L 0–3 | Finnegan (7–2) | French (4–3) | Ferrell (7) | 5,435 | 30–9 | 9–4 |
| April 18 | 6:00 PM | TCU* | No. 4 | UFCU Disch–Falk Field • Austin, TX | L 0–2 | Morrison (5–3) | Peters (5–3) | Ferrell (8) | 6,757 | 30–10 | 9–5 |
| April 19 | 4:00 PM | TCU* | No. 4 | UFCU Disch–Falk Field • Austin, TX | L 1–3 | Teakell (2–0) | Thornhill (6–1) | Ferrell (9) | 7,535 | 30–11 | 9–6 |
| April 22 | 6:00 PM | UT Pan American | No. 16 | UFCU Disch–Falk Field • Austin, TX | W 5–4 | Cooper (4–1) | Padron (1–3) | Curtiss (6) | 4,792 | 31–11 | — |
| April 25 | 7:00 PM | No. 14 Oklahoma State* | No. 16 | UFCU Disch–Falk Field • Austin, TX | W 3–0 | French (5–3) | Perrin (5–3) | Hollingsworth (1) | 6,230 | 32–11 | 10–6 |
| April 26 | 1:00 PM | No. 14 Oklahoma State* | No. 16 | UFCU Disch–Falk Field • Austin, TX | L 1–2 | Hackerott (2–1) | Cooper (4–2) | McCurry (12) | 6,388 | 32–12 | 10–7 |
| April 27 | 2:00 PM | No. 14 Oklahoma State* | No. 16 | UFCU Disch–Falk Field • Austin, TX | L 3–8 | Wheeland (5–0) | Thornhill (6–2) | — | 6,247 | 32–13 | 10–8 |
| April 29 | 6:00 PM | Prairie View A&M | No. 22 | UFCU Disch–Falk Field • Austin, TX | W 6–3 | Schiraldi (6–2) | Maldonado (1–2) | Curtiss (7) | 4,881 | 33–13 | — |

May: 3–3
| Date | Time | Opponent | Rank | Site/stadium | Score | Win | Loss | Save | Attendance | Overall | Big 12 |
|---|---|---|---|---|---|---|---|---|---|---|---|
| May 2 | 5:00 PM | at West Virginia* | No. 22 | Hawley Field • Morgantown, WV | L 3–5 | Musgrave (5–3) | French (5–4) | Carley (2) | 1,552 | 33–14 | 10–9 |
| May 3 | 3:00 PM | at West Virginia* | No. 22 | Hawley Field • Morgantown, WV | W 2–0 | Hollingsworth (2–0) | Vance (3–1) | Curtiss (8) | 1,624 | 34–14 | 11–9 |
| May 4 | 12:00 PM | at West Virginia* | No. 22 | Hawley Field • Morgantown, WV | L 6–12 | Means (6–1) | Schiraldi (6–3) | — | 2,237 | 34–15 | 11–10 |
| May 13 | 6:00 PM | Texas State | No. 28 | UFCU Disch–Falk Field • Austin, TX | Cancelled (rain) | | | | | | |
| May 16 | 6:30 PM | at Kansas State* | No. 28 | Tointon Family Stadium • Manhattan, KS | W 12–0 | Peters (6–3) | Matthys (2–5) | — | 2,674 | 35–15 | 12–10 |
| May 17 | 6:30 PM | at Kansas State* | No. 28 | Tointon Family Stadium • Manhattan, KS | L 4–5 | MaVorhis (6–7) | Curtiss (1–1) | — | 2,997 | 35–16 | 12–11 |
| May 18 | 1:00 PM | at Kansas State* | No. 28 | Tointon Family Stadium • Manhattan, KS | W 9–8^{(10)} | Culbreth (2–0) | Griep (3–7) | — | 2,811 | 36–16 | 13–11 |

Post–season: 10–5

Big 12 Tournament (2–2)
| Date | Time | Opponent | Rank | Site/stadium | Result | Win | Loss | Save | Attendance | Overall | B12T |
|---|---|---|---|---|---|---|---|---|---|---|---|
| May 21 | 7:30 PM | vs. No. 27 Texas Tech | No. 28 | Chickasaw Bricktown Ballpark • Oklahoma City, OK | W 8–3 | Schiraldi (7–3) | Taylor (5–3) | Hollingsworth (2) | 5,947 | 37–16 | 1–0 |
| May 22 | 7:30 PM | vs. No. 7 Oklahoma State | No. 28 | Chickasaw Bricktown Ballpark • Oklahoma City, OK | W 3–0 | Peters (7–3) | Perrin (7–4) | French (1) | 4,941 | 38–16 | 2–0 |
| May 24 | 12:30 PM | vs. No. 7 Oklahoma State | No. 28 | Chickasaw Bricktown Ballpark • Oklahoma City, OK | L 1–3 | Battenfield (3–0) | Curtiss (1–2) | McCurry (18) | 5,707 | 38–17 | 2–1 |
| May 24 | 4:15 PM | vs. No. 7 Oklahoma State | No. 28 | Chickasaw Bricktown Ballpark • Oklahoma City, OK | L 4–6 | Robinette (3–2) | French (5–5) | — | 4,581 | 38–18 | 2–2 |

Houston Regional (3–1)
| Date | Time | Opponent | Rank | Site/stadium | Result | Win | Loss | Save | Attendance | Overall | NCAAT |
|---|---|---|---|---|---|---|---|---|---|---|---|
| May 30 | 3:00 PM | vs. (3) Texas A&M | (2) No. 29 | Reckling Park • Houston, TX | W 8–1 | Thornhill (7–2) | Mendgen (4–9) | — | 6,603 | 39–18 | 1–0 |
| May 31 | 9:45 PM | at (1) No. 17 Rice | (2) No. 29 | Reckling Park • Houston, TX | W 3–2^{(11)} | Curtiss (2–2) | Duplantier (2–3) | — | 5,199 | 40–18 | 2–0 |
| June 1 | 8:00 PM | vs. (3) Texas A&M | (2) No. 29 | Reckling Park • Houston, TX | L 2–3 | Stubblefield (4–2) | Duke (2–1) | — | 5,011 | 40–19 | 2–1 |
| June 2 | 6:00 PM | vs. (3) Texas A&M | (2) No. 29 | Reckling Park • Houston, TX | W 4–1 | Hollingsworth (3–0) | Ray (6–1) | — | 6,825 | 41–19 | 3–1 |

Austin Super Regional (2–0)
| Date | Time | Opponent | Rank | Site/stadium | Result | Win | Loss | Save | Attendance | Overall | NCAAT |
|---|---|---|---|---|---|---|---|---|---|---|---|
| June 6 | 3:00 PM | No. 7 Houston | No. 9 | UFCU Disch–Falk Field • Austin, TX | W 4–2 | Thornhill (8–2) | Lemoine (6–8) | Curtiss (9) | 7,385 | 42–19 | 4–1 |
| June 7 | 1:00 PM | No. 7 Houston | No. 9 | UFCU Disch–Falk Field • Austin, TX | W 4–0 | French (6–5) | Garza (9–5) | — | 7,461 | 43–19 | 5–1 |

College World Series (3–2)
| Date | Time | Opponent | Rank | Site/stadium | Result | Win | Loss | Save | Attendance | Overall | CWS |
|---|---|---|---|---|---|---|---|---|---|---|---|
| June 14 | 2:00 PM | vs. No. 8 UC Irvine | No. 6 | TD Ameritrade Park • Omaha, NE | L 1–3 | Brock (9–6) | Thornhill (8–3) | — | 23,796 | 43–20 | 0–1 |
| June 16 | 2:00 PM | vs. No. 3 Louisville | No. 6 | TD Ameritrade Park • Omaha, NE | W 4–2 | French (7–5) | Kidston (9–1) | Duke (1) | 17,612 | 44–20 | 1–1 |
| June 18 | 7:00 PM | vs. No. 8 UC Irvine | No. 6 | TD Ameritrade Park • Omaha, NE | W 1–0 | Hollingsworth (4–0) | Manarino (4–4) | Duke (2) | 24,337 | 45–20 | 2–1 |
| June 20 | 2:00 PM | vs. No. 5 Vanderbilt | No. 6 | TD Ameritrade Park • Omaha, NE | W 4–0 | Thornhill (9–3) | Ferguson (8–4) | — | 18,287 | 46–20 | 3–1 |
| June 21 | 7:00 PM | vs. No. 5 Vanderbilt | No. 6 | TD Ameritrade Park • Omaha, NE | L 3–4^{(10)} | Stone (3–0) | Curtiss (2–3) | — | 16,084 | 46–21 | 3–2 |
*Big 12 Conference game. ^{#}Rankings from Collegiate Baseball released prior to game. All times are in Central Time.

== Ranking movements ==
Ranking movements Legend: ██ Increase in ranking ██ Decrease in ranking — = Not ranked
| | Week | | | | | | | | | | | | | | | | | | |
| Poll | Pre | 1 | 2 | 3 | 4 | 5 | 6 | 7 | 8 | 9 | 10 | 11 | 12 | 13 | 14 | 15 | 16 | 17 | Final |
|---|---|---|---|---|---|---|---|---|---|---|---|---|---|---|---|---|---|---|---|
| Coaches' | 22 | 22* | 22* | 18 | 15 | 20 | 14 | 11 | 9 | 8 | 10 | 11 | 17 | 20 | 20 | 20 | 20* | 20* | |
| Baseball America | 18 | 18 | 15 | 10 | 10 | 15 | 12 | 8 | 7 | 6 | 10 | 19 | 25 | 25 | 22 | 21 | 21* | 21* | |
| Collegiate Baseball^ | 20 | 25 | 24 | 17 | 14 | 19 | 15 | 9 | 7 | 4 | 16 | 22 | 28 | 28 | 28 | 29 | 9 | 6 | |
| NCBWA† | 25 | — | 27 | 20 | 16 | 19 | 16 | 11 | 9 | 7 | 10 | 12 | 17 | 19 | 19 | 20 | 9 | 9* | |

^ Collegiate Baseball ranked 40 teams in their preseason poll, but only ranked 30 teams weekly during the season.
† NCBWA ranks 30 teams in their preseason poll, but only ranks 25 teams weekly during the season.
* A new poll was not released for this week, so for comparison purposes, the previous week's ranking is inserted in this week's slot.
