= Steve Smith (pitcher) =

American baseball player and coach (born 1961)

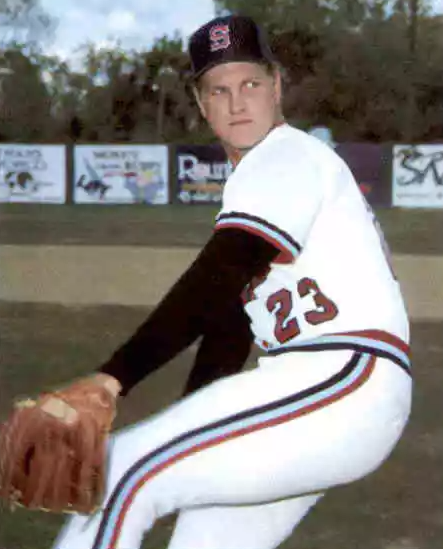
- Smith with the Shreveport Captains c. 1984

Biographical details
- Born: February 2, 1961 (age 65); Gulfport, Mississippi, U.S.

Playing career
- 1980–1981: Mississippi College
- 1982–1983: Baylor
- Position: Pitcher

Coaching career (HC unless noted)
- 1988–1989: Texas A&M (Grad. Asst.)
- 1990–1994: Mississippi State (Asst.)
- 1995–2015: Baylor
- 2017: Santa Clara (Asst.)
- 2018–2019: Auburn (P)
- 2020–2021: Tennessee Tech

Head coaching record
- Overall: 768–561–1
- Tournaments: Big 12: 30–33; NCAA: 33–28

Accomplishments and honors

Championships
- Big 12 Regular season (2000, 2005, 2012)

Awards
- Big 12 Coach of the Year (2000, 2012); 2006 Baylor Athletics Hall of Fame Inductee

Stephen Carr Smith (born February 2, 1961) is an American baseball coach and former pitcher. He was a pitching coordinator for the Detroit Tigers. He played college baseball at Baylor University from 1982 to 1983. He was the head coach at Baylor (1995–2015) and Tennessee Tech (2020–2021).

== Early life ==
Smith graduated from Gulfport High School in Gulfport, Mississippi, in 1979. While in high school, Smith played quarterback for the football team, leading Gulfport to the 1978 state championship, and pitcher for the baseball team, playing in the 1979 Mississippi High School All-Star Game.

== College career ==
Smith went on to attend Mississippi College where was played quarterback for the football team and pitcher for the baseball team. He transferred to Baylor University after two seasons, where he pitched for the Baylor Bears baseball team under Mickey Sullivan. In 1982, Smith led the Southwest Conference with a 1.72 ERA. He was drafted by the San Francisco Giants in the fifth round of the 1983 Major League Baseball draft.

== Minor league career ==
Smith began his professional career in 1983 with the Rookie League Great Falls Giants of the Pioneer League. He spent the 1984 season with the Class A Fresno Giants of the California League and the Class AA Shreveport Captains of the Texas League. Smith spent the entire 1985 season as well as most of the 1986 season with the Fresno Giants before being called up to the Class AAA Phoenix Firebirds of the Pacific Coast League.

== Coaching career ==
Smith's coaching career began as a graduate assistant for the Texas A&M Aggies baseball team in 1988. After two seasons at Texas A&M, Smith became an assistant coach for the Mississippi State Bulldogs baseball team in 1990, helping lead the Bulldogs to the 1990 College World Series. Upon Mickey Sullivan's retirement from Baylor University following the 1994 season, Smith became the head coach for the Baylor Bears baseball team.

In 1998, Smith led Baylor back to the NCAA Division I Baseball Championship for the first time since 1993. In 2000, Smith led Baylor to a Big 12 Conference championship, Baylor's first conference championship in baseball since 1966. Smith would lead Baylor to subsequent Big 12 championships in 2005 and 2012.

In 2005, Smith led Baylor to the College World Series for the first time since 1978.

With a win over Texas A&M University-Corpus Christi on April 17, 2012, Smith passed Sullivan to become the winningest coach in Baylor history.

Smith has had 67 players selection in the Major League Baseball draft, including six first round draft choices in Kip Wells, Jason Jennings, Chad Hawkins, David Murphy, Mark McCormack and Aaron Miller. Twelve Baylor players have earned All-American honors under Smith, with Jason Jennings winning the Golden Spikes Award, Dick Howser Trophy and Rotary Smith Award as the best player in college baseball, and Kelly Shoppach winning the Johnny Bench Award as the best catcher in college baseball. 39 players have earned first-team All-Conference honors under Smith, with Jason Jennings, Kelly Shoppach and Josh Ludy earning Big 12 Conference Baseball Player of the Year honors.

In 2012, the Bears won 49 games and hosted a Super Regional, but proceeded to have three losing seasons after that. Smith was fired after the 2015 season.

In 2017, Smith served as an Assistant Baseball Coach at Santa Clara University. In August 2017, Smith accepted a role of volunteer assistant and pitching coach at Auburn University.

On December 21, 2019, Smith accepted the position of head baseball coach at Tennessee Technological University. After just two seasons, Smith left Tennessee Tech for a job with the Detroit Tigers.

== Head coaching record ==
Record table
Season	Team	Overall	Conference	Standing	Postseason
Baylor Bears (Southwest Conference) (1995–1996)
1995	Baylor	25–28	7–17	6th	
1996	Baylor	32–27	11–13	4th	
Baylor Bears (Big 12 Conference) (1997–2015)
1997	Baylor	32–23	12–18	5th	Big 12 tournament
1998	Baylor	41–20–1	18–10	2nd	NCAA Regional
1999	Baylor	50–15	20–7	2nd	NCAA Super Regional
2000	Baylor	45–17	23–7	1st	NCAA Regional
2001	Baylor	37–24	17–10	4th	NCAA Regional
2002	Baylor	36–26	13–13	5th	NCAA Regional
2003	Baylor	45–23	15–12	5th	NCAA Super Regional
2004	Baylor	29–31	13–12	6th	Big 12 tournament
2005	Baylor	46–24	19–8	1st	College World Series
2006	Baylor	37–26	13–14	5th	NCAA Regional
2007	Baylor	35–27	12–15	6th	NCAA Regional
2008	Baylor	32–26	11–16	6th	Big 12 tournament
2009	Baylor	30–26	10–16	8th	NCAA Regional
2010	Baylor	36–24	12–13	6th	NCAA Regional
2011	Baylor	31–28	13–14	5th	NCAA Regional
2012	Baylor	49–17	20–4	1st	NCAA Super Regional
2013	Baylor	27–28	12–11	5th	Big 12 tournament
2014	Baylor	26–31	8–15	7th	Big 12 tournament
2015	Baylor	22–33	9–15	8th	Big 12 tournament
Baylor:		743–524–1	294–254		
Tennessee Tech Golden Eagles (Ohio Valley Conference) (2020–2021)
2020	Tennessee Tech	3–12	0–3		Season canceled due to COVID-19
2021	Tennessee Tech	22–25	15–15	6th	
Tennessee Tech:		25–37	15–18		
Total:		768–561–1			
National champion Postseason invitational champion Conference regular season champion Conference regular season and conference tournament champion Division regular season champion Division regular season and conference tournament champion Conference tournament champion
