= 2014 NCAA Division I baseball tournament =

American college baseball tournament

- Season: 2014
- Teams: 64
- Finals site: TD Ameritrade Park; Omaha, Nebraska
- Champions: Vanderbilt Commodores (1st title)
- Runner-up: Virginia Cavaliers (3rd CWS Appearance)
- Winning coach: Tim Corbin (1st title)
- MOP: Dansby Swanson (Vanderbilt)
- Television: ESPN Networks

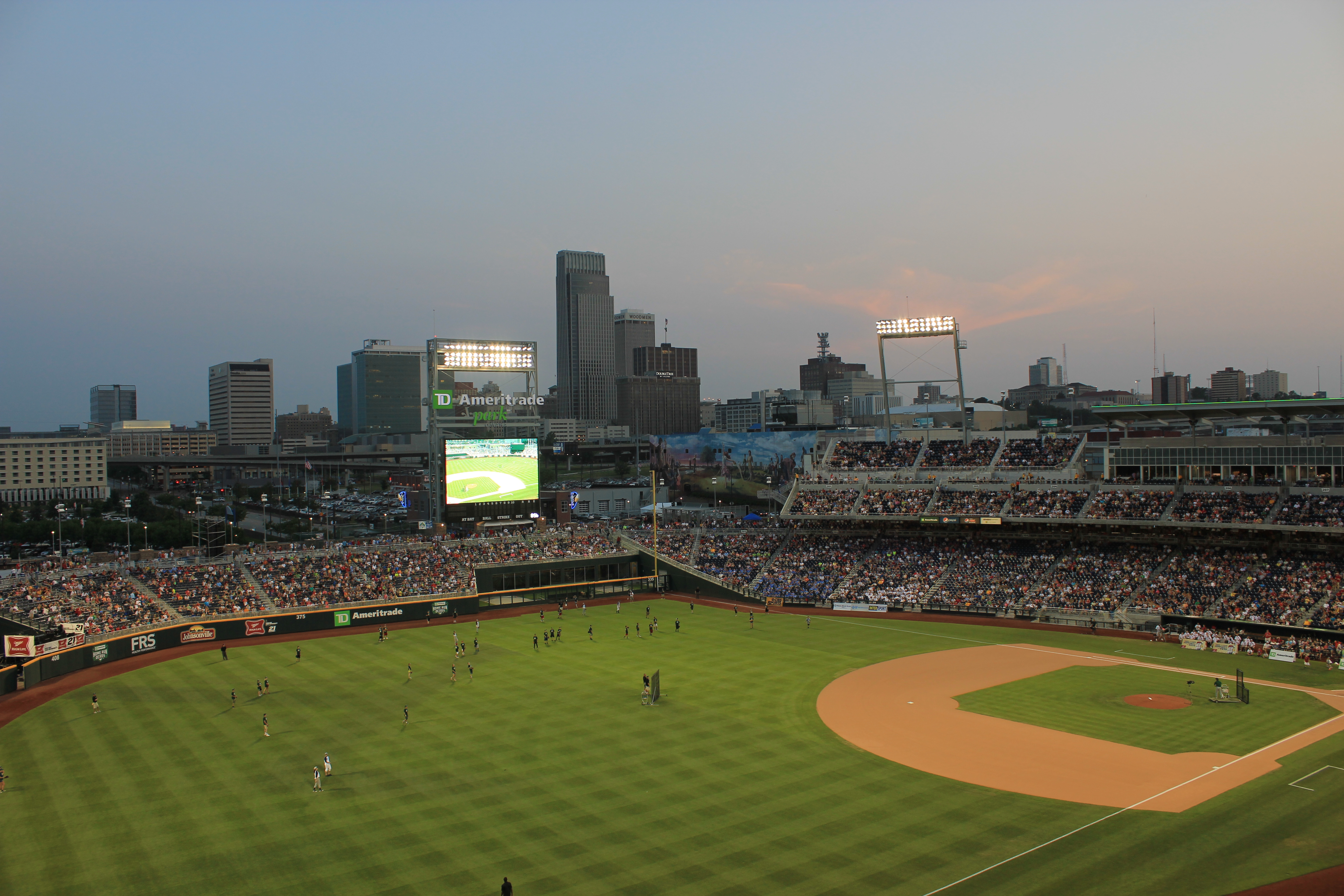
TD Ameritrade Park, Home of the 2014 Men's College World Series

The 2014 NCAA Division I baseball tournament began on Friday, May 30, 2014, as part of the 2014 NCAA Division I baseball season. The 64 team double elimination tournament concluded with the 2014 College World Series in Omaha, Nebraska, which started on June 14, 2014, and ended on June 25, 2014, with the Vanderbilt Commodores upsetting the 3rd seed Virginia Cavaliers 3–2 in the decisive Game 3.

The 64 participating NCAA Division I college baseball teams were selected out of an eligible 298 teams. A total of 31 teams were awarded an automatic bid as champions of their conferences, and 33 teams were selected at-large by the NCAA Division I Baseball Committee.

Teams were divided into 16 regionals of four teams which conducted a double-elimination tournament. Regional champions faced each other in Super Regionals, a best-of-3-game series that determined the 8 participants of the College World Series.

== Bids ==
=== Automatic bids ===
School	Conference	Record (Conf)	Berth	Last NCAA appearance
Binghamton	America East	25–25 (11–12)	Tournament	2013 (Raleigh Regional)
Houston	American	44–15 (14–9)	Tournament	2008 (College Station Regional)
Georgia Tech	Atlantic Coast	36–25 (14–16)	Tournament	2013 (Nashville Regional)
Kennesaw State	Atlantic Sun	37–21 (17–9)	Tournament	First appearance
George Mason	Atlantic 10	34–20 (16–9)	Tournament	2009 (Greenville Regional)
TCU	Big 12	42–15 (17–7)	Tournament	2012 (College Station Regional)
Xavier	Big East	29–27 (8–10)	Tournament	2009 (Houston Regional)
Campbell	Big South	40–19 (18–8)	Tournament	1990 (West I Regional)
Indiana	Big Ten	42–13 (21–3)	Tournament	2013 (Bloomington Regional)
Cal Poly	Big West	45–10 (19–5)	Regular season	2013 (Los Angeles Regional)
College of Charleston	Colonial	41–17 (15–6)	Tournament	2012 (Gainesville Regional)
Rice	Conference USA	41–18 (23–7)	Tournament	2013 (Eugene Regional)
Youngstown State	Horizon	16–36 (6–17)	Tournament	2004 (Austin Regional)
Columbia	Ivy League	29–18 (15–5)	Championship series	2013 (Fullerton Regional)
Siena	Metro Atlantic	26–31 (17–7)	Tournament	1999 (Winston-Salem Regional)
Kent State	Mid-American	36–21 (16–11)	Tournament	2012 (Gary Regional)
Bethune-Cookman	Mid-Eastern	26–31 (14–10)	Tournament	2012 (Gainesville Regional)
Dallas Baptist	Missouri Valley	40–19 (14–7)	Tournament	2012 (Waco Regional)
San Diego State	Mountain West	42–19 (17–13)	Tournament	2013 (Los Angeles Regional)
Bryant	Northeast	42–14 (19–5)	Tournament	2013 (Manhattan Regional)
Jacksonville State	Ohio Valley	36–25 (18–12)	Tournament	2010 (Auburn Regional)
Oregon State	Pac-12	42–12 (23–7)	Regular season	2013 (Corvallis Regional)
Bucknell	Patriot	30–19–1 (15–5)	Tournament	2010 (Columbia Regional)
LSU	Southeastern	44–14–1 (17–11–1)	Tournament	2013 (Baton Rouge Regional)
Georgia Southern	Southern	39–21 (15–12)	Tournament	2011 (Columbia Regional)
Southeastern Louisiana	Southland	37–23 (14–10)	Tournament	1994 (South Regional)
Jackson State	Southwestern Athletic	31–23 (9–15)	Tournament	2013 (Baton Rouge Regional)
North Dakota State	Summit	25–24 (9–12)	Tournament	1956 (District 5)
Louisiana–Lafayette	Sun Belt	53–7 (26–4)	Tournament	2013 (Baton Rouge Regional)
Pepperdine	West Coast	39–16 (18–9)	Tournament	2012 (Palo Alto Regional)
Sacramento State	Western Athletic	39–22 (21–6)	Tournament	First appearance

=== By conference ===
Conference	Total	Schools
SEC	10	Alabama, Arkansas, Florida, Kentucky, LSU, Mississippi State, Ole Miss, South Carolina, Texas A&M, Vanderbilt
ACC	7	Clemson, Florida State, Georgia Tech, Maryland, Miami (FL), North Carolina, Virginia
Big 12	5	Kansas, Oklahoma State, TCU, Texas, Texas Tech
Pac-12	5	Arizona State, Oregon, Oregon State, Stanford, Washington
Big West	4	Cal Poly, Cal State Fullerton, Long Beach State, UC Irvine
American	2	Houston, Louisville
Big South	2	Campbell, Liberty
Big Ten	2	Indiana, Nebraska
Conference USA	2	Old Dominion, Rice
Missouri Valley	2	Dallas Baptist, Indiana State
Mountain West	2	San Diego State, UNLV
Southland	2	Sam Houston State, Southeastern Louisiana
America East	1	Binghamton
Atlantic 10	1	George Mason
Atlantic Sun	1	Kennesaw State
Big East	1	Xavier
Colonial	1	College of Charleston
Horizon	1	Youngstown State
Ivy	1	Columbia
MAAC	1	Siena
Mid-American	1	Kent State
MEAC	1	Bethune-Cookman
NEC	1	Bryant
Ohio Valley	1	Jacksonville State
Patriot	1	Bucknell
Southern	1	Georgia Southern
SWAC	1	Jackson State
Summit	1	North Dakota State
Sun Belt	1	Louisiana–Lafayette
WAC	1	Sacramento State
West Coast	1	Pepperdine

== National seeds ==
The following eight teams automatically host a Super Regional if they advance to that round:

1. Oregon State †
2. Florida †
3. **Virginia**
4. Indiana †
5. Florida State †
6. Louisiana–Lafayette ‡
7. **TCU**
8. LSU †

Bold indicates College World Series participant
† indicates teams that were eliminated in the Regional Tournament
‡ indicates teams that were eliminated in the Super Regional Tournament

== Regionals and Super Regionals ==
Bold indicates winner.

=== Stillwater Super Regional ===
Regional	Regional
1	**Oregon State**	**2**
4	North Dakota State	1
1	Oregon State	2
3	**UC Irvine**	**14**
3	**UC Irvine**	**10**
2	UNLV	3
Corvallis Regional – Goss Stadium at Coleman Field
4	North Dakota State	1
2	**UNLV**	**2**
2	UNLV	1
1	**Oregon State**	**6**
1	**Oklahoma State**	**8**
4	Binghamton	0
1	**Oklahoma State**	**13**
3	Cal State Fullerton	7
3	**Cal State Fullerton**	**5**
2	Nebraska	1
Stillwater Regional – Allie P. Reynolds Stadium
4	Binghamton	6
2	**Nebraska**	**8**
2	Nebraska	3
3	**Cal State Fullerton**	**4**

Regional Final
3	**UC Irvine**	0	**4**
1	Oregon State	**4**	2
1	**Oklahoma State**	**6**	–
3	Cal State Fullerton	4	–

Super Regional
**UC Irvine**	**8**	**1**	–
Oklahoma State	4	0	–

=== Austin Super Regional ===
Hosted by Texas at UFCU Disch–Falk Field

Regional	Regional
1	**Rice**	**7**
4	George Mason	2
1	Rice	2
2	**Texas**	**3**^{11}
3	Texas A&M	1
2	**Texas**	**8**
Houston Regional – Reckling Park
4	George Mason	3
3	**Texas A&M**	**7**
1	Rice	8
3	**Texas A&M**	**9^{10}**
1	**LSU**	**8**
4	Southeastern Louisiana	4
1	**LSU**	**5**
2	Houston	1
3	Bryant	2
2	**Houston**	**3**^{10}
Baton Rouge Regional – Alex Box Stadium/Skip Bertman Field
4	**Southeastern Louisiana**	**2**
3	Bryant	1^{10}
4	Southeastern Louisiana	5
2	**Houston**	**9**

Regional Final
2	**Texas**	2	**4**
3	Texas A&M	**3**	1
1	LSU	4	2
2	**Houston**	**5**^{11}	**12**

Super Regional
**Texas**	**4**	**4**	–
Houston	2	0	–

=== Louisville Super Regional ===
Regional	Regional
1	Florida State	0
4	**Georgia Southern**	**7**
4	Georgia Southern	5
3	**Kennesaw State**	**13**^{11}
3	**Kennesaw State**	**1**
2	Alabama	0
Tallahassee Regional – Mike Martin Field at Dick Howser Stadium
1	Florida State	5
2	**Alabama**	**6**
2	**Alabama**	**6**
4	Georgia Southern	0
1	**Louisville**	**5**
4	Kent State	0
1	**Louisville**	**6**
3	Kansas	3
3	**Kansas**	**10**
2	Kentucky	6
Louisville Regional – Jim Patterson Stadium
4	Kent State	2
2	**Kentucky**	**4**
2	**Kentucky**	**8**
3	Kansas	6

Regional Final
3	**Kennesaw State**	1	**4**
2	Alabama	**4**	2
1	**Louisville**	**4**	–
2	Kentucky	1	–

Super Regional
Kennesaw State	3	4	–
**Louisville**	**5**	**7**	–

=== Nashville Super Regional ===
Regional	Regional
1	**Vanderbilt**	**11**
4	Xavier	0
1	**Vanderbilt**	**7**
2	Oregon	2
3	Clemson	1
2	**Oregon**	**18**
Nashville Regional – Hawkins Field
4	**Xavier**	**6**
3	Clemson	4
4	Xavier	8
2	**Oregon**	**11**^{10}
1	**Indiana**	**10**
4	Youngstown State	2
1	**Indiana**	**4**
3	Stanford	2
3	**Stanford**	**8**
2	Indiana State	1
Bloomington Regional – Bart Kaufman Field
4	**Youngstown State**	**5**
2	Indiana State	2
4	Youngstown State	4
3	**Stanford**	**12**

Regional Final
1	**Vanderbilt**	**3**	–
2	Oregon	2	–
1	Indiana	7	4
3	**Stanford**	**10**	**5**

Super Regional
**Vanderbilt**	**11**	4	**12**
Stanford	6	**5**	5

=== Lubbock Super Regional ===
Hosted by Texas Tech at Dan Law Field at Rip Griffin Park

Regional	Regional
1	Florida	2
4	**College of Charleston**	**3**
4	**College of Charleston**	**6**
2	Long Beach State	3
3	North Carolina	1
2	**Long Beach State**	**6**
Gainesville Regional – Alfred A. McKethan Stadium
1	Florida	2
3	**North Carolina**	**5**
3	North Carolina	5
2	**Long Beach State**	**12**
1	**Miami (FL)**	**1**
4	Bethune-Cookman	0
1	Miami (FL)	0
2	**Texas Tech**	**3**
3	Columbia	2
2	**Texas Tech**	**3**
Coral Gables Regional – Alex Rodriguez Park at Mark Light Field
4	**Bethune-Cookman**	**6**
3	Columbia	5
4	Bethune-Cookman	0
1	**Miami (FL)**	**10**

Regional Final
4	**College of Charleston**	**4**	–
2	Long Beach State	2	–
2	**Texas Tech**	1	**4**
1	Miami (FL)	**2**^{10}	0

Super Regional
College of Charleston	0	0	–
**Texas Tech**	**1**	**1**	–

=== Fort Worth Super Regional ===
Regional	Regional
1	**Cal Poly**	**4**
4	Sacramento State	2
1	Cal Poly	1
3	**Pepperdine**	**2**
3	**Pepperdine**	**3**
2	Arizona State	2
San Luis Obispo Regional – Baggett Stadium
4	**Sacramento State**	**5**
2	Arizona State	4
4	Sacramento State	5
1	**Cal Poly**	**6**
1	**TCU**	**2**
4	Siena	1^{11}
1	**TCU**	**3**
3	Sam Houston State	2^{22}
3	**Sam Houston State**	**2**
2	Dallas Baptist	1
Fort Worth Regional – Lupton Stadium
4	**Siena**	**9**
2	Dallas Baptist	8^{10}
4	Siena	2
3	**Sam Houston State**	**9**

Regional Final
3	**Pepperdine**	**10**	–
1	Cal Poly	6	–
1	**TCU**	**6**	–
3	Sam Houston State	1	–

Super Regional
Pepperdine	2	**3**	5
7	**TCU**	**3**	2	**6**

=== Lafayette Super Regional ===
Regional	Regional
1	Louisiana–Lafayette	0
4	**Jackson State**	**1**
4	Jackson State	1
2	**Mississippi State**	**3**
3	San Diego State	2
2	**Mississippi State**	**5**
Lafayette Regional – M.L. Tigue Moore Field
1	**Louisiana–Lafayette**	**9**
3	San Diego State	2
1	**Louisiana–Lafayette**	**11**
4	Jackson State	1
1	**Ole Miss**	**12**
4	Jacksonville State	2
1	**Ole Miss**	**2**
2	Washington	1
3	Georgia Tech	0
2	**Washington**	**8**
Oxford Regional – Swayze Field
4	Jacksonville State	2
3	**Georgia Tech**	**4**
3	Georgia Tech	2
2	**Washington**	**4**

Regional Final
2	Mississippi State	8	3
1	**Louisiana–Lafayette**	**14**	**5**
1	**Ole Miss**	**3**	–
2	Washington	2^{10}	–

Super Regional
6	Louisiana–Lafayette	**9**	2	4
**Ole Miss**	5	**5**	**10**

=== Charlottesville Super Regional ===
Regional	Regional
1	**South Carolina**	**5**
4	Campbell	2
1	South Carolina	3
2	**Maryland**	**4**
3	Old Dominion	3
2	**Maryland**	**4**
Columbia Regional – Carolina Stadium
4	**Campbell**	**4**
3	Old Dominion	1^{12}
4	Campbell	0
1	**South Carolina**	**9**
1	**Virginia**	**10**
4	Bucknell	1
1	**Virginia**	**3**
2	Arkansas	0
3	Liberty	2
2	**Arkansas**	**3**
Charlottesville Regional – Davenport Field
4	**Bucknell**	**5**
3	Liberty	2
4	Bucknell	0
2	**Arkansas**	**10**

Regional Final
2	**Maryland**	**10**	–
1	South Carolina	1	–
1	**Virginia**	**9**	–
2	Arkansas	2	–

Super Regional
Maryland	**5**	3	2
3	**Virginia**	4	**7**	**11**

== College World Series ==
The 2014 College World Series began on June 14, 2014, and was held at TD Ameritrade Park in Omaha, Nebraska. It concluded on June 25, 2014, with Vanderbilt winning the national championship by defeating Virginia 2 games to 1 in the final round.

=== Participants ===
School	Conference	Record (conference)	Head coach	Previous CWS Appearances	Best CWS Finish	CWS record Not including this year
Louisville	American	50–15 (19–5)	Dan McDonnell	2 (last: 2013)	5th (2007)	1–4
Ole Miss	SEC	46–19 (19–11)	Mike Bianco	4 (last: 1972)	4th (1956)	3–8
TCU	Big 12	47–16 (17–7)	Jim Schlossnagle	1 (2010)	3rd (2010)	3–2
Texas	Big 12	43–19 (13–11)	Augie Garrido	34 (last: 2011)	1st (1949, 1950, 1975, 1983, 2002, 2005)	82–57
Texas Tech	Big 12	45–19 (14–10)	Tim Tadlock	none	none	0–0
UC Irvine	Big West	40–23 (15–9)	Mike Gillespie	1 (2007)	3rd (2007)	2–2
Vanderbilt	SEC	46–19 (17–13)	Tim Corbin	1 (2011)	3rd (2011)	2–2
Virginia	ACC	49–14 (22–8)	Brian O'Connor	2 (last: 2011)	3rd (2011)	3–4

=== Bracket ===
Seeds listed below indicate national seeds only.

First round
**UC Irvine**	**3**
Texas	1
Louisville	3
**Vanderbilt**	**5**
**Texas**	**4**
Louisville	1
Texas Tech	2
7	**TCU**	**3**
Ole Miss	1
3	**Virginia**	**2**
Texas Tech	1
**Ole Miss**	**2**

Second round
UC Irvine	4
**Vanderbilt**	**6**
**Texas**	**1**
UC Irvine	0
7	TCU	2
3	**Virginia**	**3**^{15}
**Ole Miss**	**6**
7	TCU	4

Semifinals
**Vanderbilt**	0	**4**
Texas	**4**	3^{10}
3	**Virginia**	**4**	–
Ole Miss	1	–

Final
**Vanderbilt**	**9**	2	**3**
3	Virginia	8	**7**	2

=== Game results ===
Date	Game	Winner	Score	Loser	Winning pitcher	Losing pitcher	Saving pitcher	Notes
June 14	Game 1	UC Irvine	3–1	Texas	Evan Brock	Nathan Thornhill	—	
June 14	Game 2	Vanderbilt	5–3	Louisville	Carson Fulmer	Kyle Funkhouser	Adam Ravenelle	
June 15	Game 3	TCU	3–2	Texas Tech	Riley Ferrell	Jonny Drozd	—	
June 15	Game 4	Virginia	2–1	Ole Miss	Artie Lewicki	Aaron Greenwood	—	
June 16	Game 5	Texas	4–1	Louisville	Parker French	Anthony Kidston	Travis Duke	Louisville eliminated
June 16	Game 6	Vanderbilt	6–4	UC Irvine	Walker Buehler	Elliot Surrey	—	
June 17	Game 7	Ole Miss	2–1	Texas Tech	Scott Weathersby	Cameron Smith	—	Texas Tech eliminated
June 17	Game 8	Virginia	3–2 (15)	TCU	Artie Lewicki	Trey Teakell	—	Longest game in College World Series history
June 18	Game 9	Texas	1–0	UC Irvine	Chad Hollingsworth	Evan Manarino	Travis Duke	UC Irvine eliminated
June 19	Game 10	Ole Miss	6–4	TCU	Josh Laxer	Jordan Kipper	Aaron Greenwood	TCU eliminated
June 20	Game 11	Texas	4–0	Vanderbilt	Nathan Thornhill	Tyler Ferguson	—	
June 20/21^{[a]}	Game 12	Virginia	4–1	Ole Miss	Josh Sborz	Chris Ellis	Nick Howard	Ole Miss eliminated
June 21	Game 13	Vanderbilt	4–3 (10)	Texas	Hayden Stone	John Curtiss	—	Texas eliminated
June 23	Final Game 1	Vanderbilt	9–8	Virginia	Jared Miller	Nathan Kirby	Adam Ravenelle	
June 24	Final Game 2	Virginia	7–2	Vanderbilt	Brandon Waddell	Tyler Beede	—	
June 25	Final Game 3	Vanderbilt	3–2	Virginia	Hayden Stone	Nick Howard	Adam Ravenelle	Vanderbilt wins College World Series

^{^[a]}Game began Friday night at 7:00 pm CT. A rain delay occurred at 7:32 pm. The game was suspended at 9:05 pm and resumed Saturday at 2:02 pm.

=== All-Tournament Team ===
The following players were members of the College World Series All-Tournament Team.

Position	Player	School
P	Artie Lewicki	Virginia
P	Brandon Waddell	Virginia
C	Nate Irving	Virginia
1B	Kevin Cron	TCU
2B	Branden Cogswell	Virginia
3B	Tyler Campbell	Vanderbilt
SS	C. J. Hinojosa	Texas
OF	Brandon Downes	Virginia
OF	John Norwood	Vanderbilt
OF	Rhett Wiseman	Vanderbilt
DH	**Dansby Swanson (MOP)**	Vanderbilt

== Final standings ==
Seeds listed below indicate national seeds only

Place	School	Record
1st	Vanderbilt	10–3
2nd	#3 Virginia	9–3
3rd	Ole Miss	7–3
3rd	Texas	8–3
5th	#7 TCU	6–3
5th	UC Irvine	6–3
7th	Louisville	5–2
7th	Texas Tech	5–3
9th	College of Charleston	3–2
9th	Houston	4–3
9th	Kennesaw State	3–3
9th	#6 Louisiana–Lafayette	5–3
9th	Maryland	4–2
9th	Oklahoma State	3–2
9th	Pepperdine	4–2
9th	Stanford	5–3
17th	Alabama	3–2
17th	Arkansas	2–2
17th	Cal Poly	2–2
17th	Cal State Fullerton	2–2
17th	#4 Indiana	2–2
17th	Kentucky	2–2
17th	Long Beach State	2–2
17th	#8 LSU	2–2
17th	Miami (FL)	3–2
17th	Mississippi State	2–2
17th	Oregon	2–2
17th	#1 Oregon State	3–2
17th	Sam Houston State	2–2
17th	South Carolina	2–2
17th	Texas A&M	3–2
17th	Washington	2–2
33rd	Bethune-Cookman	1–2
33rd	Bucknell	1–2
33rd	Campbell	1–2
33rd	Georgia Southern	1–2
33rd	Georgia Tech	1–2
33rd	Jackson State	1–2
33rd	Kansas	1–2
33rd	Nebraska	1–2
33rd	North Carolina	1–2
33rd	Rice	1–2
33rd	Sacramento State	1–2
33rd	Siena	1–2
33rd	Southeastern Louisiana	1–2
33rd	UNLV	1–2
33rd	Xavier	1–2
33rd	Youngstown State	1–2
49th	Arizona State	0–2
49th	Binghamton	0–2
49th	Bryant	0–2
49th	Clemson	0–2
49th	Columbia	0–2
49th	Dallas Baptist	0–2
49th	#2 Florida	0–2
49th	#5 Florida State	0–2
49th	George Mason	0–2
49th	Indiana State	0–2
49th	Jacksonville State	0–2
49th	Kent State	0–2
49th	Liberty	0–2
49th	North Dakota State	0–2
49th	Old Dominion	0–2
49th	San Diego State	0–2

== Record by conference ==
Conference	# of Bids	Record	Win %	RF	SR	WS	NS	CS	NC
Southeastern	10	33–22	.600	9	2	2	2	1	1
Atlantic Coast	7	18–15	.545	3	2	1	1	1	–
Big 12	5	23–13	.639	4	4	3	1	–	–
American	2	9–5	.643	2	2	1	–	–	–
Big West	4	12–9	.571	4	1	1	–	–	–
Pac-12	5	12–11	.522	4	1	–	–	–	–
West Coast	1	4–2	.667	1	1	–	–	–	–
Sun Belt	1	5–3	.625	1	1	–	–	–	–
Colonial	1	3–2	.600	1	1	–	–	–	–
Atl Sun	1	3–3	.500	1	1	–	–	–	–
Big Ten	2	3–4	.429	1	–	–	–	–	–
Southland	2	3–4	.429	1	–	–	–	–	–
Big South	2	1–4	.200	–	–	–	–	–	–
Conference USA	2	1–4	.200	–	–	–	–	–	–
Mountain West	2	1–4	.200	–	–	–	–	–	–
Missouri Valley	2	0–4	.000	–	–	–	–	–	–
Other	15	8–30	.211	–	–	–	–	–	–

The columns RF, SR, WS, NS, CS, and NC respectively stand for the Regional Finals, Super Regionals, College World Series, National Semifinals, Championship Series, and National Champion.

== Media coverage ==
=== Radio ===
NRG Media, in conjunction with Westwood One/NCAA Radio Network provided nationwide radio coverage of the College World Series, which was streamed online at westwoodonesports.com. Kevin Kugler and John Bishop called all games leading up to the Championship Series with Gary Sharp acting as the field reporter. The Championship Series was called by Kugler and Scott Graham with Sharp acting as the field reporter.

=== Television ===
ESPN carried every game from the Regionals, Super Regionals, and College World Series across the ESPN Networks (ESPN, ESPN2, ESPNU, and ESPN3). ESPN also provided Bases Loaded coverage for the Regionals. Bases Loaded was hosted by Dari Nowkhah and Matt Schick with Kyle Peterson and Mike Rooney providing analysis. Bases Loaded aired Friday and Saturday from 2:00 pm–midnight ET, Sunday from 2:00 pm–1:00 am ET, and Monday from 6:00 pm–1:00 am ET on ESPN3. ESPN2 and ESPNU aired Bases Loaded in between games and throughout other select times during the tournament.

==== Broadcast assignments ====
Regionals

- Adam Amin & Danny Kanell – Corvallis, Oregon
- Mark Neely & Randy Flores – Stillwater, Oklahoma
- Tom Hart & Ben McDonald – Houston, Texas
- Brett Dolan & Nick Belmonte – Baton Rouge, Louisiana
- Joe Davis & Greg Swindell – Tallahassee, Florida
- Clay Matvick & Gabe Gross – Louisville, Kentucky
- Dave Neal & Chris Burke – Nashville, Tennessee
- Jim Barbar & John Gregory – Bloomington, Indiana

Super Regionals

- Dave Neal, Kyle Peterson, Chris Burke, & Jaymee Sire – Nashville, Tennessee
- Dari Nowkhah, Danny Kanell, & Kaylee Hartung – Austin, Texas
- Carter Blackburn & Alex Cora – Louisville, Kentucky
- Clay Matvick & Eduardo Perez – Stillwater, Oklahoma

College World Series

- Jon Sciambi, Aaron Boone, & Jaymee Sire - Afternoons
- Karl Ravech, Kyle Peterson, & Jessica Mendoza – Evenings

Regionals

- Trey Bender & Rusty Ensor – Gainesville, Florida
- Doug Sherman & Leland Maddox – Coral Gables, Florida
- Roxy Bernstein & Wes Clements – San Luis Obispo, California
- Wayne Hagan & Jerry Kendall – Ft. Worth, Texas
- Kevin Dunn & Keith Moreland – Lafayette, Louisiana
- Mike Morgan & Dave Perno – Oxford, Mississippi
- Dave Weekley & Chip Fridrich – Columbia, South Carolina
- Paul Loeffler & Jay Walker – Charlottesville, Virginia

Super Regionals

- Mike Patrick & Doug Glanville – Charlottesville, Virginia
- Joe Davis & Jay Walker – Lubbock, Texas
- Adam Amin & Keith Moreland – Ft. Worth, Texas
- Tom Hart & Ben McDonald – Lafayette, Louisiana

College World Series Championship Series

- Karl Ravech, Kyle Peterson, Aaron Boone, Jessica Mendoza, & Jaymee Sire
