= 2014 Big 12 Conference baseball tournament =

American college baseball tournament

- Big 12 baseball Championships
- Teams: 8
- Format: Double-elimination tournament
- Finals site: Chickasaw Bricktown Ballpark; Oklahoma City
- Champions: TCU (1st title)
- Winning coach: Jim Schlossnagle (1st title)
- MVP: Jerrick Suiter (TCU)
- Television: Bracket Play: FCS Central/FSSW+ Championship: FS1

2014 Big 12 Conference baseball standings
	Conf.				Overall
Team	W		L	PCT	W		L	PCT
No. 10 Oklahoma State ‍†‍‍^{y}	18	–	6	.750	48	–	18	.727
No. 5 TCU ‍‍‡‍^{y}	17	–	7	.708	48	–	18	.727
Kansas ‍‍‍^{y}	15	–	9	.625	35	–	26	.574
No. 8 Texas Tech ‍‍‍^{y}	14	–	10	.583	45	–	21	.682
No. 3 Texas ‍‍‍^{y}	13	–	11	.542	46	–	21	.687
West Virginia ‍‍‍	9	–	14	.391	28	–	26	.519
Baylor ‍‍‍	8	–	15	.348	26	–	31	.456
Oklahoma ‍‍‍	8	–	16	.333	29	–	29	.500
Kansas State ‍‍‍	5	–	19	.208	25	–	30	.455
† – Conference champion ‡ – Tournament champion y – Invited to the NCAA tournament Rankings from Collegiate Baseball

The 2014 Big 12 Conference baseball tournament was held from May 21 through 25 at Chickasaw Bricktown Ballpark in Oklahoma City. The annual tournament determined the conference champion of the Division I Big 12 Conference for college baseball. TCU won the tournament for the first time, earning the league's automatic bid to the 2014 NCAA Division I baseball tournament.

The tournament has been held since 1997, the inaugural year of the Big 12 Conference. Among current league members, Texas has won the most championships with four. Among original members, Baylor and Kansas State have never won the event. Iowa State discontinued their program after the 2001 season without having won a title. West Virginia, a new member of the league in 2013, had also have yet to win the Tournament, as of 2014.

== Format and seeding ==
The top eight finishers from the regular season were seeded one through eight, and then played a two-bracket double-elimination tournament leading to a winner-take-all championship game.

Place	Seed	Team	Conference				Overall		
Place	Seed	Team	W	L	%	GB	W	L	%
1	1	Oklahoma State	18	6	.750	–	48	18	.727
2	2	TCU	17	7	.708	1	48	18	.727
3	3	Kansas	15	9	.625	3	35	26	.574
4	4	Texas Tech	14	10	.583	4	45	21	.682
5	5	Texas	13	11	.542	5	46	21	.687
6	6	West Virginia	9	14	.391	8.5	28	26	.519
7	7	Baylor	8	15	.348	9.5	26	31	.456
8	8	Oklahoma	8	16	.333	10	29	29	.500
9	–	Kansas State	5	19	.208	13	25	30	.455

== Results ==
First round
1	Oklahoma State	13
8	Oklahoma	4
4	Texas Tech	3
5	Texas	8
8	Oklahoma	9
4	Texas Tech	8
3	Kansas	9
6	West Virginia	10
2	TCU	8
7	Baylor	5
3	Kansas	3
7	Baylor	4

Second round
1	Oklahoma State	0
5	Texas	3
1	Oklahoma State	11
8	Oklahoma	8
6	West Virginia	2
2	TCU	6
6	West Virginia	4
7	Baylor	9

Semifinals
5	Texas	1	4
1	Oklahoma State	3	6
2	TCU	4	–
7	Baylor	1	–

Final
1	Oklahoma State	1
2	TCU	7

== All-Tournament Team ==
The following players were named to the All-Tournament Team.

Pos	Name	School
C	Bryan Case	Oklahoma State
1B	Tanner Krietemeier	Oklahoma State
2B	Garret Crain	TCU
SS	Donnie Walton	Oklahoma State
3B	Sheldon Neuse	Oklahoma
OF	Craig Aikin	Oklahoma
OF	Cody Jones	TCU
OF	Mark Payton	Texas
DH	Jerrick Suiter	TCU
P	Tyler Alexander	TCU
P	Jordan Kipper	TCU
P	Preston Morrison	TCU

=== Most Outstanding Player ===
TCU designated hitter Jerrick Suiter, one of the Horned Frogs' six all-tournament selections, was named Most Outstanding Player.
