= Midland Christian School =

Location
- 2001 Culver Drive; Midland, Texas 79705; United States
- Coordinates: 32.0089°N 102.1151°W

Information
- Type: private
- Religious affiliation: Christian (Churches of Christ)
- Established: 1957
- Grades: Kindergarten – 12th grade
- Gender: coeducational
- Enrollment: 1197 (2020–21)

Midland Christian School is a private Christian K–12 school in Midland, Texas, associated with the Churches of Christ. The school is a member of the National Christian School Association; it is governed by a board of directors and is one of the largest Christian schools in the United States.

== History ==
The school opened in 1957 with 30 students in kindergarten and first grade in a building behind the founders' church in downtown Midland. It moved to three buildings on its current campus in 1963, and after the gradual addition of grades, graduated its first high school class in 1981. In 2020–21, enrollment was 1,197; it has been above 1,200, the second largest school of its kind in the country. Ground was broken in 2011 for a construction project including new junior high and high school buildings.

In January 2022, a parent reported an alleged sexual assault in a locker room as part of freshman hazing. Five administrators—the superintendent, the principal and vice principal of the secondary school, the athletic director, and the head baseball coach—were subsequently arrested and charged with failure to report with intent to conceal neglect or abuse. The charges were subsequently no-billed by a Midland grand jury and dismissed. The five administrators have sued the City of Midland and individual police officers relating to the incident.

== Activities ==
Midland Christian's athletics teams are the Mustangs; it has programs in baseball, basketball, cheerleading, cross country, football, golf, softball, tennis, track and field, and volleyball. The football team lost to Dallas Parish Episcopal School in the final of the 2021 TAPPS Division 1 Championship.

== Notable alumni ==
- Chris Withrow, baseball player
- Carson Smith, baseball player
