= Siena Saints baseball =

Baseball team in Loudonville, New York, United States

- 2026 Siena Saints baseball team
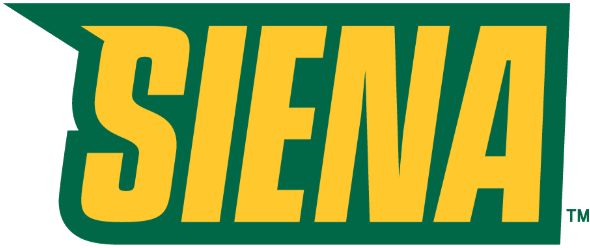
- University: Siena College
- Head coach: Alex Jurczynski (3rd season)
- Conference: MAAC
- Location: Loudonville, New York
- Home stadium: Connors Park (Capacity: 500)
- Nickname: Saints
- Colors: Green and gold

NCAA tournament appearances
- 1999, 2014

Conference tournament champions
- 1995, 1996, 1997, 1999, 2014

Conference regular season champions
- 1995, 1996, 1999, 2001

The Siena Saints baseball team, formerly the Siena Indians, is a varsity intercollegiate athletic team of Siena College in Loudonville, New York. The team is a member of the Metro Atlantic Athletic Conference, which is part of the National Collegiate Athletic Association's Division I. The team plays its home games at Connors Park in Loudonville, New York. The Saints are coached by Alex Jurczynski. The Saints were coached by Tony Rossi for an NCAA record, 53 1/2 seasons before he announced his retirement effective March 20, 2023.

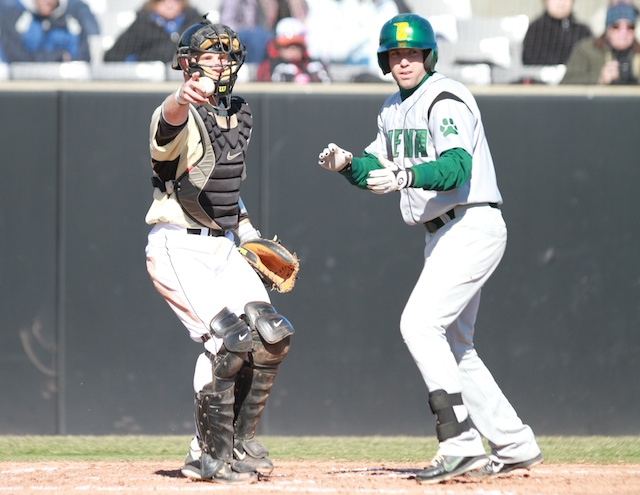
A baseball game between Army and Siena in 2011

== Siena in the NCAA Tournament ==
Year	Record	Pct	Notes
1999	0–2	.000	Winston-Salem Regional
2014	1–2	.333	Fort Worth Regional
TOTALS	1–4	.200	

== Notable former players ==
- Tim Christman
- Matt Gage
- Billy Harrell
- Gary Holle
- John Lannan

== See also ==
- List of NCAA Division I baseball programs
