= Dillon Peters =

American baseball player (born 1992)

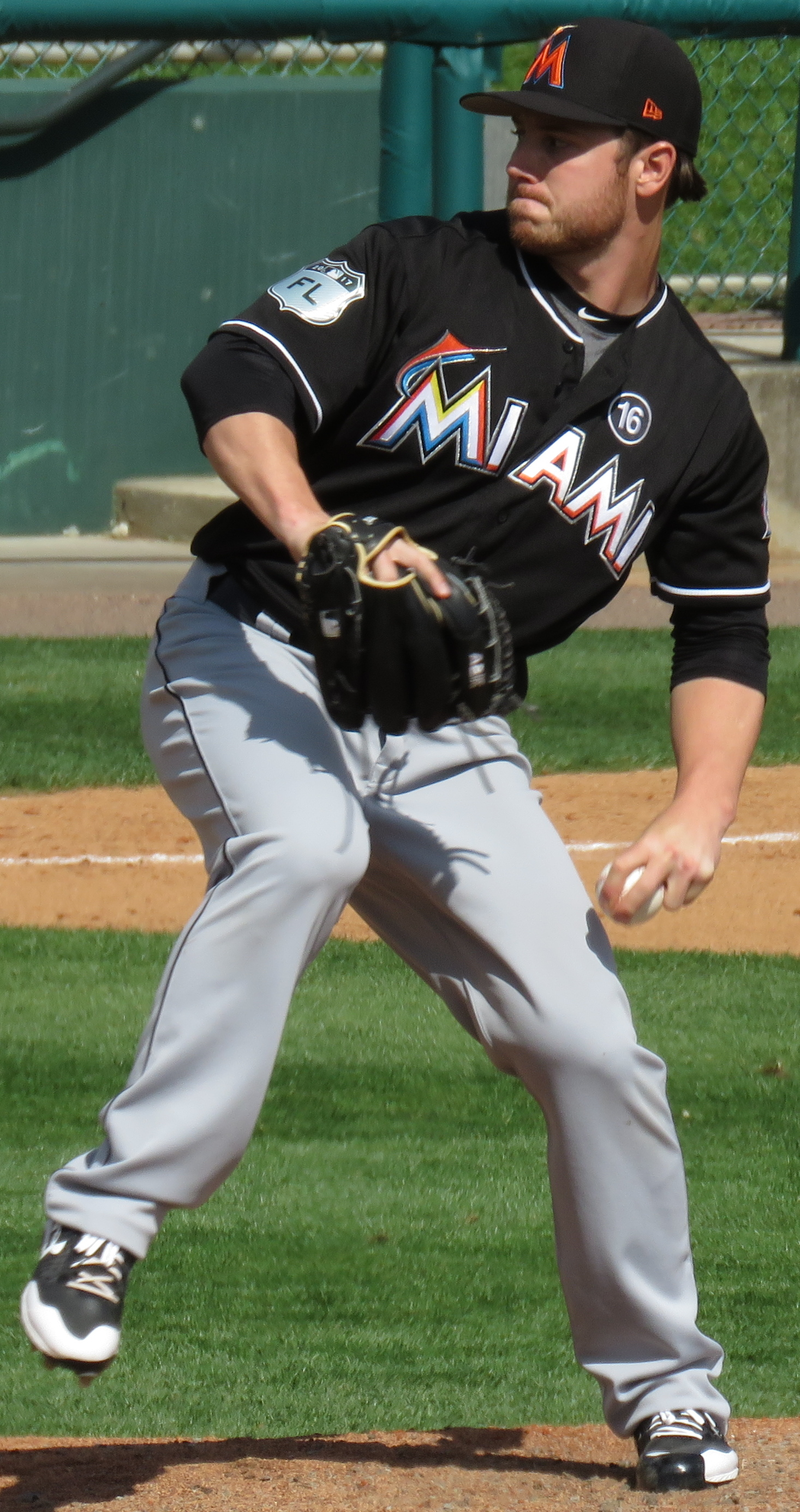
- Peters with the Miami Marlins
- Pitcher
- Born: August 31, 1992 (age 33); Indianapolis, Indiana, U.S.
- Batted: Left Threw: Left

Professional debut
- MLB: September 1, 2017, for the Miami Marlins
- NPB: April 1, 2023, for the Tokyo Yakult Swallows

Last appearance
- MLB: August 3, 2022, for the Pittsburgh Pirates
- NPB: October 5, 2023, for the Tokyo Yakult Swallows

MLB statistics
- Win–loss record: 13–12
- Earned run average: 5.30
- Strikeouts: 150

NPB statistics
- Win–loss record: 6-5
- Earned run average: 3.22
- Strikeouts: 66
- Stats at Baseball Reference

Teams
- Miami Marlins (2017–2018); Los Angeles Angels (2019–2020); Pittsburgh Pirates (2021–2022); Tokyo Yakult Swallows (2023)

Dillon James Peters (born August 31, 1992) is an American former professional baseball pitcher. Peters was drafted by the Miami Marlins in the 10th round of the 2014 MLB draft and made his MLB debut with them in 2017. He has also played in MLB for the Los Angeles Angels and Pittsburgh Pirates and in Nippon Professional Baseball (NPB) with the Tokyo Yakult Swallows.

== Career ==
=== High school and college ===
Peters attended Cathedral High School in Indianapolis, Indiana and was drafted by the Cleveland Indians in the 20th round of the 2011 Major League Baseball draft. He did not sign and instead attended the University of Texas at Austin, where he played college baseball. In 2013, he played collegiate summer baseball with the Harwich Mariners of the Cape Cod Baseball League. His junior season came to an end early after he suffered an elbow injury which required Tommy John Surgery. Despite the injury, he was drafted by the Miami Marlins in the 10th round of the 2014 MLB draft.

=== Miami Marlins ===
Peters made his professional debut in 2015 with the GCL Marlins and was later promoted to the Batavia Muckdogs; in 11 total starts between the two teams, he was 1–4 with a 3.60 ERA. In 2016, he played for the Jupiter Hammerheads and Jacksonville Suns, compiling a combined 14–6 record and 2.38 ERA over 24 total starts. He spent 2017 with Jupiter, Jacksonville, and the GCL Marlins, posting a combined 7–3 record and 1.57 ERA in 13 starts.

The Marlins promoted Peters to the major leagues where he made his debut on September 1, 2017. He started six games for Miami in 2017, going 1–2 with a 5.17 ERA, with 27 strikeouts in 31.1 innings.

In 2018, again pitching for Miami, he was 2–2 with a 7.16 ERA, and 17 strikeouts in 27.2 innings.

=== Los Angeles Angels ===
On November 21, 2018, Peters was traded to the Los Angeles Angels in exchange for RHP Tyler Stevens. Peters made 17 appearances for Los Angeles in 2019, posting a 4–4 record and 5.38 ERA with 55 strikeouts in 72.0 innings of work.

In 2020 for the Angels, Peters only pitched 1.2 innings, giving up 3 earned runs to go along with two strikeouts and a 16.20 ERA. On February 8, 2021, Peters was designated for assignment following the acquisition of Aaron Slegers. He was outrighted on February 13 and invited to Spring Training as a non-roster invitee.

On May 19, 2021, Peters was selected to the active roster. Peters spent his entire time on the 40-man roster in Salt Lake, and was designated for assignment on July 14 without making an appearance for the Angels.

=== Pittsburgh Pirates ===
On July 19, 2021, Peters was traded to the Pittsburgh Pirates in exchange for cash considerations and was optioned to the Triple-A Indianapolis Indians.

Peters made 22 appearances (4 starts) for Pittsburgh in 2022, registering a 4.58 ERA with 26 strikeouts across 39 1/3 innings of work. On September 15, 2022, Peters was designated for assignment. He cleared waivers and was sent outright to Triple–A Indianapolis on September 18. Peters elected free agency following the season on October 6.

=== Tokyo Yakult Swallows ===
On December 20, 2022, Peters signed with the Tokyo Yakult Swallows of Nippon Professional Baseball. In 18 games for the Swallows in 2023, he registered a 6–5 record and 3.22 ERA with 66 strikeouts across 100 2/3 innings of work. Following the season on November 8, 2023, Yakult announced that they would not keep Peters under contract for the following season, and he became a free agent.
