= 2014 Virginia Tech Hokies baseball team =

American college baseball season

2014 Virginia Tech Hokies baseball
- Conference: Atlantic Coast Conference
- Record: 18–25-1 (7–17 ACC)
- Head coach: Patrick Mason (1st season)
- Assistant coaches: Robert Woodard; Mike Kunigonis; Gabe Ortiz
- Home stadium: English Field

2014 Atlantic Coast Conference baseball standings
	Conf.						Overall
Team	W		L		T	PCT	W		L		T	PCT
Atlantic
No. 21 Florida State ^{x}‍‍‍^{y}	21	–	9	–	0	.700	43	–	17	–	0	.717
No. 16 Maryland ‍‍‍^{y}	15	–	14	–	0	.517	40	–	23	–	0	.635
Clemson ‍‍‍^{y}	15	–	14	–	0	.517	36	–	25	–	0	.590
Wake Forest ‍‍‍	15	–	15	–	0	.500	30	–	26	–	0	.536
NC State ‍‍‍	13	–	17	–	0	.433	32	–	23	–	0	.582
Boston College ‍‍‍	10	–	20	–	0	.333	22	–	33	–	0	.400
Notre Dame ‍‍‍	9	–	21	–	0	.300	22	–	31	–	0	.415
Coastal
No. 22 Miami (FL) ^{x}‍‍‍^{y}	24	–	6	–	0	.800	44	–	19	–	0	.698
No. 2 Virginia ‍‍‍^{y}	22	–	8	–	0	.733	47	–	14	–	0	.770
Duke ‍‍‍	16	–	14	–	0	.533	33	–	25	–	0	.569
North Carolina ‍‍‍^{y}	15	–	15	–	0	.500	35	–	27	–	0	.565
Georgia Tech ‍‍‡‍^{y}	14	–	16	–	0	.467	37	–	27	–	0	.578
Pittsburgh ‍‍‍	11	–	19	–	0	.367	22	–	30	–	0	.423
Virginia Tech ‍‍‍	9	–	21	–	0	.300	21	–	31	–	1	.406
x – Division champion ‡ – Tournament champion y – Invited to the NCAA tournament As of January 16, 2015; Rankings from Collegiate Baseball

The 2014 Virginia Tech Hokies baseball team represented Virginia Tech in the 2014 NCAA Division I baseball season. Head coach Patrick Mason was in his 1st year coaching the Hokies. They were coming off a 2013 season, in which they had a 40 win season. 15 of them came in the ACC. That marked the fifth straight year with over 30 wins.

== Personnel ==
2014 Virginia Tech Hokies Roster
Pitchers: 35 Brad Markey - Senior; 28 Tanner McIntyre - Redshirt Senior; 32 JD Doran - Junior; 39 Justin Kelly - Junior; 37 Stuart Springer - Junior; 11 Luis Collazo - Sophomore; 29 Sean Kennedy - Sophomore; 23 Jon Woodcock - Redshirt Sophomore; 38 Matt Tulley - Sophomore; 7 Tyler Knight - Freshman; 36 Joe Burris - Freshman; 27 Mack Krupp - Freshman; 33 Andrew McDonald - Freshman; 31 Aaron McGarity - Freshman; 9 Kit Scheetz - Redshirt Freshman; 17 Luke Scherzer - Freshman	Infielders: 5 Erik Payne - Redshirt Junior; 8 Alex Perez - Junior; 10 Rahiem Cooper - Sophomore; 41 Matt Dauby - Sophomore; 16 Ryan Burns - Redshirt Sophomore; 24 Mac Caples - Freshman; 13 Miguel Ceballos - Freshman; 21 Sam Fragale - Freshman; 40 Ricky Surum - Freshman; 14 Ryan Tufts - Freshman; Utility: 34 Brendon Hayden - Junior; 25 Sean Keselica - Junior; 15 Phil Sciretta - Sophomore; 3 Garrett Hudson - Freshman	Catchers: 2 Mark Zagunis - Junior; 30 Andrew Mogg - Sophomore; Outfielders: 6 Logan Bible - Redshirt Sophomore; 18 Saige Jenco - Redshirt Freshman; 4 Kyle Wernicki - Redshirt Junior; 26 Nick Anderson - Freshman; 12 Tom Stoffel - Freshman

== Schedule ==
2014 Virginia Tech baseball game log
Regular season
February

Date	Opponent	Rank	Site/stadium	Score	Win	Loss	Save	Attendance	Overall record	ACC record
February 14	The Citadel	–	Joseph P. Riley Jr. Park	2-6	J. Reeves(1-0)	T. McIntyre(0-1)	None	520	0-1	–
February 15	Delaware	–	Joseph P. Riley Jr. Park	8-1	B. Markey(1-0)	A. Davis(0-1)	None	214	1-1	–
February 21	at #5 LSU	–	Alex Box Stadium/Skip Bertman Field	0-9	Nola(2-0)	B. Markey(1-1)	None	11,417	1-2	–
February 22	Texas Southern	–	Alex Box Stadium/Skip Bertman Field	8-2	K. Scheetz(1-0)	Gomez(0-1)	A. McGarity(1)	285	2-2	–
February 23	Toledo	–	Alex Box Stadium/Skip Bertman Field	Cancelled due to weather						
February 25	Radford	–	English Field	6-1	L. Collazo(1-0)	Austin (0-2)	None	186	3-2	–
February 28	Cincinnati	–	English Field	4-1	B. Markey(2-1)	M. Ring(1-1)	L. Scherzer(1)	342	4-2	–

March

Date	Opponent	Rank	Site/stadium	Score	Win	Loss	Save	Attendance	Overall record	ACC record
March 1	UMass-Lowell	-	English Field	4-3	T. McIntyre(1-1)	N. Boutoures(0-1)	None	582	5-2	–
March 2	UMass-Lowell	-	English Field	4-6	T. Denaro(2-0)	L. Scherzer(0-1)	S. Xirinachs(2)	611	5-3	–
March 2	Cincinnati	-	English Field	9-6	Kennedy(1-0)	C. Walsh(1-1)	None	476	6-3	–
March 5	William & Mary	-	English Field	0-7	N. Brown(2-0)	M. Tulley(0-1)	None	345	6-4	–
March 7	at #15 Clemson*	-	Doug Kingsmore Stadium	6-7	M. Campbell(2-0)	B. Markey(0-1)	None	3,175	6-5	0–1
March 8	at #15 Clemson*	-	Doug Kingsmore Stadium	2-12	M. Crownover(3-1)	K. Scheetz(1-1)	None	5,481	6-6	0-2
March 9	at #15 Clemson*	-	Doug Kingsmore Stadium	4-11	C. Schmidt(2-2)	T.McIntyre(1-2)	None	4,556	6-7	0-3
March 11	at Richmond	-	Malcolm U. Pitt Field	10-10	-	-	-	408	6-7-1	0–3
March 12	VCU	-	English Field	14-21	M. Lees(2-1)	P. Sciretta(0-1)	T. Gill(2)	192	6-8-1	0–3
March 14	Pittsburgh*	-	English Field	11-5	T. McIntyre (2-2)	H. Harris(2-2)	None	768	7-8-1	1–3
March 15	Pittsburgh*	-	English Field	11-10	L. Scherzer(1-1)	H. Harris(2-3)	None	981	8-8-1	2–3
March 15	Pittsburgh*	-	English Field	11-7	P. Sciretta (1-1)	M. Wotherspoon(2-3)	S. Kennedy(1)	522	9-8-1	3–3
March 19	Rutgers	-	English Field	6-3	P. Sciretta(2-1)	K. Baxter(0-3)	L. Scherzer(2)	371	10-8-1	3–3
March 21	at Notre Dame*	-	Frank Eck Stadium	1-2	S. Fitzgerald(3-1)	B. Markey(2-3)	None	253	10-9-1	3–4
March 22	at Notre Dame*	-	Frank Eck Stadium	8-3	S. Keselica(2-0)	N. McCarty(0-5)	L.Scherzer(3)	681	11-9-1	4–4
March 23	at Notre Dame*	-	Frank Eck Stadium	5-4	L. Scherzer (2-1)	M. Hearne (1-2)	S. Kennedy(2)	422	12-9-1	5–4
March 28	at #1 Virginia*	-	Davenport Field	1-2	W. Mayberry(2-1)	B. Markey(2-4)	N. Howard(7)	3,414	12-10-1	5–5
March 29	at #1 Virginia*	-	Davenport Field	2-9	C. Jones(4-0)	S. Keselica(2-1)	None	3,587	12-11-1	5–6
March 30	at #1 Virginia*	-	Davenport Field	4-7	W. Mayberry(3-1)	S. Kennedy(1-1)	N. Howard(8)	2,500	12-12-1	5–7

April

Date	Opponent	Rank	Site/stadium	Score	Win	Loss	Save	Attendance	Overall record	ACC record
April 1	James Madison	-	English Field	11-5	J. Doran(1-0)	Gunst(1-4)	None	1,672	13-12-1	5-7
April 2	Radford	-	English Field	8-5	K. Scheetz(2-1)	COSTELLO(2-1)	L. Scherzer(4)	1,067	14-12-1	5–7
April 4	#24 Miami*	-	English Field	7-8	Hammond(4-0)	A. Perez(0-1)	Garcia(8)	1,045	14-13-1	5-8
April 5	#24 Miami*	-	English Field	3-4	Suarez(4-1)	S. Keselica(2-2)	Garcia(9)	1,468	14-14-1	5-9
April 6	#24 Miami*	-	English Field	2-9	Radziewski(2-2)	L. Woodcock(0-1)	None	1,083	14-15-1	5-10
April 8	at VCU	-	The Diamond (Richmond, Virginia)	6-11	Lees(5-2)	S. Kennedy(1-2)	None	8226	14-16-1	5-10
April 9	Longwood	-	English Field	4-1	A. Perez(1-1)	Simpson(1-2)	A. McDonald(1)	164	15-16-1	5-10
April 11	Maryland*	-	English Field	3-1	S. Keselica(3-2)	Stinnett(3-5)	B. Markey(1)	1,583	16-16-1	6-10
April 12	Maryland*	-	English Field	2-4	M. Shawaryn(6-2)	A. McGarity(0-1)	Mooney(6)	1,542	16-17-1	6-11
April 13	Maryland*	-	English Field	6-4	J. Woodcock(1-1)	Ruse(4-1)	T. McIntyre(1)	1,136	17-17-1	7-11
April 14	at #30 Liberty	-	Liberty Baseball Stadium	4-3	K. Scheetz(3-1)	Lyons(2-2)	L. Scherzer(5)	2,702	18-17-1	7-11
April 18	Duke*	-	English Field	2-3	Hendrix(2-1)	B. Markey(2-5)	None	946	18-18-1	7-12
April 19	Duke*	-	English Field	3-13	Swart(3-1)	A. McGarity(0-2)	None	1,925	18-19-1	7-13
April 20	Duke*	-	English Field	0-2	Matuella(1-1)	J. Woodcock(1-2)	Huber(7)	951	18-20-1	7-14
April 22	Appalachian State	-	English Field	0-11	Mason(1-1)	A. Perez(1-2)	None	285	18-21-1	7-14
April 23	Campbell	-	English Field	9-14	Darcy(1-0)	A. McGarity(0-3)	None	316	18-22-1	7-14
April 25	at North Carolina*	-	Boshamer Stadium	2-3	Kelley(1-1)	S. Keselica(3-3)	Hovis(5)	1,328	18-23-1	7-15
April 26	North Carolina*	-	Boshamer Stadium	4-6	Moss(3-2)	B. Markey(2-6)	Hovis(6)	3,720	18-24-1	7-16
April 27	North Carolina*	-	Boshamer Stadium	4-5	Hovis(6-1)	Scherzer(2-2)	None	2,770	18-25-1	7-17
April 29	at Radford	-	Radford Baseball Stadium	-	-	-	-	-	-	-

May

Date	Opponent	Rank	Site/stadium	Score	Win	Loss	Save	Attendance	Overall record	ACC record
May 2	at Georgia Tech*	-	Russ Chandler Stadium	-	-	-	-	-	-	-
May 3	at Georgia Tech*	-	Russ Chandler Stadium	-	-	-	-	-	-	-
May 4	at Georgia Tech*	-	Russ Chandler Stadium	-	-	-	-	-	-	-
May 6	West Virginia	-	H. P. Hunnicutt Field	-	-	-	-	-	-	-
May 7	Northeastern	-	English Field	-	-	-	-	-	-	-
May 13	William & Mary	-	English Field	-	-	-	-	-	-	-
May 15	NC State*	-	English Field	-	-	-	-	-	-	-
May 16	NC State*	-	English Field	-	-	-	-	-	-	-
May 17	NC State*	-	English Field	-	-	-	-	-	-	-

Postseason
ACC Tournament

Date	Opponent	Rank	Site/stadium	Score	Win	Loss	Save	Attendance	Tournament record
May 20	-	–	UNCG Baseball Stadium	-	-	-	-	-	-
May 21	-	–	UNCG Baseball Stadium	-	-	-	-	-	-
May 22	-	–	UNCG Baseball Stadium	-	-	-	-	-	-
May 23	-	–	UNCG Baseball Stadium	-	-	-	-	-	-
May 24	-	–	UNCG Baseball Stadium	-	-	-	-	-	-
May 25	-	–	UNCG Baseball Stadium	-	-	-	-	-	-

Rankings from USA TODAY/ESPN Top 25 coaches' baseball poll. Parenthesis indicate tournament seedings.
*ACC Conference games

== See also ==
- Virginia Tech Hokies
- 2014 NCAA Division I baseball season
