= 2014 Maryland Terrapins baseball team =

Baseball team season

2014 Maryland Terrapins baseball
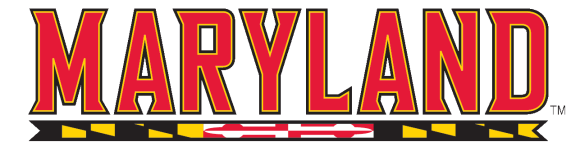
- Conference: Atlantic Coast Conference
- Record: 40–23 (15–14 ACC)
- Head coach: John Szefc (2nd season)
- Assistant coaches: Jim Belanger (2nd season); Rob Vaughn (2nd season)
- Home stadium: Shipley Field

2014 Atlantic Coast Conference baseball standings
	Conf.						Overall
Team	W		L		T	PCT	W		L		T	PCT
Atlantic
No. 21 Florida State ^{x}‍‍‍^{y}	21	–	9	–	0	.700	43	–	17	–	0	.717
No. 16 Maryland ‍‍‍^{y}	15	–	14	–	0	.517	40	–	23	–	0	.635
Clemson ‍‍‍^{y}	15	–	14	–	0	.517	36	–	25	–	0	.590
Wake Forest ‍‍‍	15	–	15	–	0	.500	30	–	26	–	0	.536
NC State ‍‍‍	13	–	17	–	0	.433	32	–	23	–	0	.582
Boston College ‍‍‍	10	–	20	–	0	.333	22	–	33	–	0	.400
Notre Dame ‍‍‍	9	–	21	–	0	.300	22	–	31	–	0	.415
Coastal
No. 22 Miami (FL) ^{x}‍‍‍^{y}	24	–	6	–	0	.800	44	–	19	–	0	.698
No. 2 Virginia ‍‍‍^{y}	22	–	8	–	0	.733	47	–	14	–	0	.770
Duke ‍‍‍	16	–	14	–	0	.533	33	–	25	–	0	.569
North Carolina ‍‍‍^{y}	15	–	15	–	0	.500	35	–	27	–	0	.565
Georgia Tech ‍‍‡‍^{y}	14	–	16	–	0	.467	37	–	27	–	0	.578
Pittsburgh ‍‍‍	11	–	19	–	0	.367	22	–	30	–	0	.423
Virginia Tech ‍‍‍	9	–	21	–	0	.300	21	–	31	–	1	.406
x – Division champion ‡ – Tournament champion y – Invited to the NCAA tournament As of January 16, 2015; Rankings from Collegiate Baseball

The 2014 Maryland Terrapins baseball team represented the University of Maryland, College Park during the 2014 NCAA Division I baseball season. The Terrapins played their home games at Shipley Field, in their final season as members of the Atlantic Coast Conference. Maryland finished the regular season with a 34–19 record, including a 15–14 record in ACC play, finishing in a tie for second place in the ACC Atlantic Division standings, behind Florida State and tied with Clemson. Maryland earned a bid to the 2014 NCAA Division I baseball tournament, where they were placed in the Charlottesville Super Regional, with South Carolina, Old Dominion, and Campbell in the Columbia Regional. Maryland defeated Old Dominion and South Carolina (twice) to advance to the Super Regional, where there lost two out of three games to eventual national runner-up Virginia.

== Previous season ==
In 2013, the Terrapins finished the season fourth in the ACC Atlantic Division with a record of 30–25, and 11–19 in conference play. They failed to qualify for the 2013 Atlantic Coast Conference baseball tournament or the 2013 NCAA Division I baseball tournament.

== Roster ==
2014 Maryland Terrapins baseball team
Players
Coaches

#	Pos.	Name	B/T	Height	Weight	Year	Previous school	Home town
5	OF	Andrew Amaro	L/R	6 ft 1 in (1.85 m)	188 lb (85 kg)	Jr	William Penn Charter School	Bensalem, PA
35	RHP	Chase Brewis	R/R	5 ft 11 in (1.8 m)	155 lb (70 kg)	Fr	Riverdale Baptist School	Glen Burnie, MD
27	LHP	Ben Brewster	L/L	6 ft 3 in (1.91 m)	219 lb (99 kg)	Sr	Park School of Baltimore	Baltimore, MD
24	RHP	Brandon Casas	R/R	6 ft 6 in (1.98 m)	220 lb (100 kg)	So	Gilman School	Pasadena, MD
31	C	Nick Cieri	L/R	6 ft 3 in (1.91 m)	220 lb (100 kg)	Fr	Rancocas Valley Regional HS	Hainesport, NJ
22	INF	Kyle Convissar	R/R	6 ft 2 in (1.88 m)	204 lb (93 kg)	Sr	Severna Park HS	Severna Park, MD
12	INF	José Cuas	R/R	6 ft 3 in (1.91 m)	180 lb (82 kg)	So	Grand Street Campus	Brooklyn, NY
23	LHP	Jake Drossner	R/L	6 ft 3 in (1.91 m)	195 lb (88 kg)	So	Council Rock North HS	Richboro, PA
28	LHP	Robert Galligan	R/L	6 ft 4 in (1.93 m)	220 lb (100 kg)	So	St. Dominic HS	Syosset, NY
36	RHP	Andrew Green	R/R	6 ft 6 in (1.98 m)	230 lb (104 kg)	Fr	Blair Academy	Blairstown, NJ
15	INF	Patrick Hisle	R/R	5 ft 9 in (1.75 m)	165 lb (75 kg)	Fr	Walt Whitman HS	Bethesda, MD
17	OF	Bradley Keith	L/R	6 ft 3 in (1.91 m)	165 lb (75 kg)	Fr	DeMatha Catholic HS	Millersville, MD
3	RHP	Brady Kirkpatrick	R/R	6 ft 2 in (1.88 m)	185 lb (84 kg)	Sr	Marist Catholic HS	Eugene, OR
10	INF	Krysthian Leal	L/R	5 ft 10 in (1.78 m)	175 lb (79 kg)	Jr	Cibola HS; Yavapai College	Yuma, AZ
39	OF	Tim Lewis	L/R	5 ft 10 in (1.78 m)	185 lb (84 kg)	Jr	Lawrence Free State HS; Allen CC	Lawrence, KS
16	INF	Brandon Lowe	L/R	5 ft 10 in (1.78 m)	165 lb (75 kg)	RS Fr	Nansemond River HS	Suffolk, VA
32	C	Kevin Martir	R/R	6 ft 0 in (1.83 m)	200 lb (91 kg)	So	Grand Street Campus	Brooklyn, NY
26	C	John Mazza	R/R	5 ft 11 in (1.8 m)	180 lb (82 kg)	Fr	Dexter School	Lexington, MA
20	OF	Michael Montville	R/R	6 ft 2 in (1.88 m)	200 lb (91 kg)	RS Jr	Portsmouth HS	Portsmouth, NH
33	RHP	Kevin Mooney	R/R	6 ft 2 in (1.88 m)	215 lb (98 kg)	So	North Harford HS	Forest Hill, MD
37	LHP	Zach Morris	L/L	6 ft 5 in (1.96 m)	225 lb (102 kg)	RS So	DeMatha Catholic HS	Edgewater, MD
34	INF	Matt Oniffrey	L/L	6 ft 0 in (1.83 m)	175 lb (79 kg)	Fr	Fox Lane HS	Pound Ridge, NY
13	OF	Anthony Papio	L/R	6 ft 3 in (1.91 m)	188 lb (85 kg)	So	Sherwood HS	Olney, MD
43	LHP	Jamie Pashuck	L/L	6 ft 4 in (1.93 m)	234 lb (106 kg)	Sr	Lancaster Catholic HS	Christiana, PA
9	RHP	Jared Price	R/R	6 ft 2 in (1.88 m)	190 lb (86 kg)	So	Twin Valley HS	Mohnton, PA
40	INF	Mike Rescigno	R/R	6 ft 2 in (1.88 m)	210 lb (95 kg)	Fr	Red Bank Catholic HS	Monmouth Beach, NJ
42	LHP	Alex Robinson	L/L	6 ft 3 in (1.91 m)	220 lb (100 kg)	So	Holy Trinity HS	Hewlett, NY
29	RHP	Bobby Ruse	R/R	6 ft 3 in (1.91 m)	210 lb (95 kg)	Jr	C. Milton Wright HS	Bel Air, MD
1	INF	Blake Schmit	R/R	6 ft 1 in (1.85 m)	185 lb (84 kg)	Sr	Eden Prairie HS	Eden Prairie, MN
30	RHP	Ryan Selmer	R/R	6 ft 8 in (2.03 m)	202 lb (92 kg)	Fr	Riverdale Baptist School	Beltsville, MD
18	RHP	Mike Shawaryn	R/R	6 ft 4 in (1.93 m)	210 lb (95 kg)	Fr	Gloucester Catholic HS	Carneys Point, NJ
25	LHP	Tayler Stiles	L/L	6 ft 2 in (1.88 m)	220 lb (100 kg)	Fr	Bishop McNamara HS	Bowie, MD
7	RHP	Jake Stinnett	R/R	6 ft 4 in (1.93 m)	215 lb (98 kg)	Sr	Rancho Buena Vista HS	Vista, CA
6	INF	LaMonte Wade	L/L	6 ft 1 in (1.85 m)	180 lb (82 kg)	So	St. Paul's School	Owings Mills, MD
4	OF	Charlie White	L/L	5 ft 10 in (1.78 m)	175 lb (79 kg)	Jr	Naperville North HS	Naperville, IL

Head coach

John Szefc

Assistant coach(es)

Jim Belanger
Rob Vaughn

Legend

- (C) Team captain
- (S) Suspended
- (I) Ineligible
- Injured
- Current redshirt

Roster
Last update: July 13th, 2014

== Schedule ==
Legend
	Maryland win
	Maryland loss
	Postponement
**Bold**	Maryland team member

2014 Maryland Terrapins baseball game log
Regular season
February

#	Date	Opponent	Rank	Site/stadium	Score	Win	Loss	Save	Attendance	Overall record	ACC Record
1	February 14	@ #20 Florida		Alfred A. McKethan Stadium	0–4	Poyner (1–0)	**Stinnett** (0–1)	Young (1)	4,026	0–1	0–0
2	February 15	@ #20 Florida		Alfred A. McKethan Stadium	9–7	**Shawaryn** (1–0)	Morales (0–1)	**Mooney** (1)	3,900	1–1	0–0
3	February 16	@ #20 Florida		Alfred A. McKethan Stadium	5–8 ^{(8)}	Hanhold (1–0)	**Price** (0–1)	Harris (1)	3,742	1–2	0–0
4	February 22	Bryant		Shipley Field	3–0	**Stinnett** (1–1)	Schlitter (0–1)	**Brewster** (1)	576	2–2	0–0
5	February 22	Bryant		Shipley Field	3–0	**Shawaryn** (2–0)	McAvoy (0–1)	**Mooney** (2)	848	3–2	0–0
6	February 23	Bryant		Shipley Field	7–3	**Price** (1–1)	Hayward (0–1)		398	4–2	0–0
7	February 25	@ James Madison		Eagle Field	13–6	**Drossner** (1–0)	Howerton (1–1)		276	5–2	0–0

March

#	Date	Opponent	Rank	Site/stadium	Score	Win	Loss	Save	Attendance	Overall record	ACC Record
8	March 1	UMass		Shipley Field	4–0	**Stinnett** (2–1)	LeBlanc (0–2)		314	6–2	0–0
9	March 1	UMass		Shipley Field	10–1	**Shawaryn** (3–0)	Moloney (0–2)		397	7–2	0–0
10	March 2	UMass		Shipley Field	3–2 ^{(10)}	**Robinson** (1–0)	Plunkett (0–1)		263	8–2	0–0
11	March 7	@ #2 Florida State		Dick Howser Stadium	3–15	Weaver (3–1)	**Stinnett** (2–2)		4,056	8–3	0–1
12	March 8	@ #2 Florida State		Dick Howser Stadium	5–1	**Shawaryn** (4–0)	Leibrandt (2–1)		4,801	9–3	1–1
13	March 9	@ #2 Florida State		Dick Howser Stadium	0–7	Compton (2–0)	**Price** (1–2)		4,059	9–4	1–2
14	March 11	Delaware		Shipley Field	10–1	**Stiles** (1–0)	Geffre (0–2)		408	10–4	1–2
15	March 14	#13 North Carolina		Shipley Field	0–7	Thornton (5–0)	**Stinnett** (2–3)		523	10–5	1–3
16	March 15	#13 North Carolina		Shipley Field	3–2	**Stiles** (2–0)	Rice (0–1)		610	11–5	2–3
17	March 16	#13 North Carolina		Shipley Field	4–9	Gallen (2–1)	**Mooney** (0–1)		523	11–6	2–4
18	March 18	Delaware		Harford Baseball Field	5–2	**Ruse** (1–0)	Milley (0–1)	Stiles (1)	120	12–6	2–4
19	March 19	UMBC		Harford Baseball Field	6–0	**Drossner** (2–0)	Mikush (0–1)		146	13–6	2–4
20	March 21	#11 NC State		Shipley Field	10–0	**Stinnett** (3–3)	Rodon (2–4)		493	14–6	3–4
21	March 22	#11 NC State		Shipley Field	7–4	**Shawaryn** (5–0)	Jernigan (3–2)	**Mooney** (3)	438	15–6	4–4
22	March 23	#11 NC State		Shipley Field	5–2	**Ruse** (2–0)	Stone (3–1)	**Mooney** (4)	403	16–6	5–4
23	March 28	#20 Clemson	#25	Shipley Field	1–3	Gossett (3–0)	**Casas** (0–1)	Campbell (5)	449	16–7	5–5
24	March 28	#20 Clemson	#25	Shipley Field	1–7	Crownover (5–2)	**Shawaryn** (5–1)		575	16–8	5–6

April

#	Date	Opponent	Rank	Site/stadium	Score	Win	Loss	Save	Attendance	Overall record	ACC Record
25	April 1	VCU		Shipley Field	5–2	**Ruse** (3–0)	Howie (2–1)	**Mooney** (5)	508	17–8	5–6
26	April 2	Liberty		Shipley Field	8–3	**Drossner** (3–0)	Lyons (2–1)		331	18–8	5–6
27	April 4	@ Wake Forest		Wake Forest Baseball Park	4–6	Fischer (4–2)	**Stinnett** (3–4)	Fossas (7)	564	18–9	5–7
28	April 5	@ Wake Forest		Wake Forest Baseball Park	2–5	McLeod (5–1)	**Shawaryn** (5–2)	Fossas (8)	843	18–10	5–8
29	April 6	@ Wake Forest		Wake Forest Baseball Park	11–3	**Ruse** (4–0)	Kaden (2–3)		648	19–10	6–8
30	April 8	@ George Mason		Spuhler Field	11–0	**Drossner** (4–0)	Bowie (0–3)		111	20–10	6–8
31	April 9	Mount St. Mary's		Shipley Field	2–3	Nickerson (1–2)	**Stiles** (2–1)	Riley (3)	353	20–11	6–8
32	April 11	@ Virginia Tech		English Field	1–3	Keselica (3–2)	**Stinnett** (3–5)	Markey (1)	1,583	20–12	6–9
33	April 12	@ Virginia Tech		English Field	4–2	**Shawaryn** (6–2)	McGarity (0–1)	**Mooney** (6)	1,542	21–12	7–9
34	April 13	@ Virginia Tech		English Field	4–6	Woodcock (1–1)	**Ruse** (4–1)	McIntyre (1)	1,136	21–13	7–10
35	April 16	Navy		Shipley Field	11–4	**Morris** (1–0)	Condry (0–1)		347	22–13	7–10
36	April 18	#25 Georgia Tech		Shipley Field	7–2	**Stinnett** (4–5)	Heddinger (2–2)		569	23–13	8–10
37	April 19	#25 Georgia Tech		Shipley Field	4–1	**Shawaryn** (7–2)	Stanton (3–2)	**Mooney** (7)	641	24–13	9–10
38	April 20	#25 Georgia Tech		Shipley Field	6–13	Isaacs (5–4)	**Ruse** (4–2)		411	24–14	9–11
39	April 22	@ West Virginia		Hawley Field	2–14	Vance (2–0)	**Stiles** (2–2)		608	24–15	9–11
40	April 23	George Mason		Shipley Field	13–4	**Morris** (2–0)	Porcella (1–1)		201	25–15	9–11
41	April 25	@ Boston College		Pellagrini Diamond	1–5	Gorman (3–6)	**Stinnett** (4–6)	King (2)	453	25–16	9–12
42	April 25	@ Boston College		Pellagrini Diamond	4–7	Chin (4–2)	**Shawaryn** (7–3)	Nicklas (3)	414	25–17	9–13
43	April 27	@ Boston College		Pellagrini Diamond	2–5	Burke (1–5)	**Drossner** (4–1)		707	25–18	9–14
44	April 29	James Madison		Shipley Field	3–6	Howerton (2–2)	**Morris** (2–1)	Cundiff (3)	156	25–19	9–14

May

#	Date	Opponent	Rank	Site/stadium	Score	Win	Loss	Save	Attendance	Overall record	ACC Record
45	May 2	Notre Dame		Shipley Field	2–0	**Stinnett** (5–6)	Connaughton (1–5)		406	26–19	10–14
46	May 3	Notre Dame		Shipley Field	6–2	**Shawaryn** (8–2)	Hearne (4–5)	**Brewster** (2)	497	27–19	11–14
47	May 4	Notre Dame		Shipley Field	3–2	**Ruse** (5–2)	Hissa (1–4)	**Mooney** (8)	439	28–19	12–14
48	May 6	@ VCU		The Diamond	12–1	**Ruse** (5–2)	Greene (2–1)		406	29–19	12–14
49	May 7	@ Towson		Ripken Stadium	4–3	**Stiles** (3–2)	Golczewski (1–1)	**Mooney** (9)	435	30–19	12–14
50	May 9	@ Pittsburgh		Charles L. Cost Field	21–1	**Stinnett** (6–6)	Aldenhoven (2–3)		220	31–19	13–14
51	May 10	@ Pittsburgh		Charles L. Cost Field	5–1	**Shawaryn** (9–3)	Harvey (2–2)		197	32–19	14–14
52	May 11	@ Pittsburgh		Charles L. Cost Field	6–4	**Mooney** (1–1)	Zeuch (2–5)		413	33–19	15–14
53	May 13	West Virginia		Shipley Field	4–2	**Ruse** (7–2)	Walter (1–5)	**Stinnett** (1)	363	34–19	15–14

Post-season
ACC Tournament

#	Date	Opponent	Rank	Site/stadium	Score	Win	Loss	Save	Attendance	Overall record	Tourn. Record
54	May 22	#3 Virginia		NewBridge Bank Park	7–6	**Stinnett** (7–6)	Rosenberger (1–1)	**Mooney** (10)	3,408	35–19	1–0
55	May 23	#4 Florida State		NewBridge Bank Park	5–3	**Shawaryn** (10–3)	Compton (7–2)	**Mooney** (11)	3,531	36–19	2–0
56	May 24	North Carolina		NewBridge Bank Park	7–13	Hovis (8–1)	**Galligan** (0–1)		3,972	36–20	2–1
57	May 25	Georgia Tech		NewBridge Bank Park	4–9	Roberts (1–2)	**Mooney** (1–2)		4,186	36–21	2–2

NCAA Regionals

#	Date	Opponent	Rank	Site/stadium	Score	Win	Loss	Save	Attendance	Overall record	NCAAT Record
58	May 30	Old Dominion		Carolina Stadium	4–3	**Stiles** (4–2)	Gero (3–4)		5,178	37–21	1–0
59	May 31	@ South Carolina		Carolina Stadium	4–3	**Shawaryn** (11–3)	Wynkoop (7–6)	**Mooney** (12)	6,813	38–21	2–0
60	June 1	@ South Carolina		Carolina Stadium	10–1	**Stiles** (5–2)	Seddon (3–2)	**Ruse** (1)	6,340	39–21	3–0

NCAA Super Regionals

#	Date	Opponent	Rank	Site/stadium	Score	Win	Loss	Save	Attendance	Overall record	NCAAT Record
61	June 7	@ Virginia		Davenport Field	5–4	**Stinnett** (8–6)	Kirby (9–2)	**Mooney** (13)	5,001	40–21	4–0
62	June 8	@ Virginia		Davenport Field	3–7	Waddell (9–3)	**Shawaryn** (11–4)	Lewicki (1)	5,001	40–22	4–1
63	June 9	@ Virginia		Davenport Field	2–11	Sborz (5–4)	**Ruse** (7–3)		5,001	40–23	4–2

2014 Maryland Terrapins baseball schedule

== Rankings ==
Ranking movements Legend: ██ Increase in ranking ██ Decrease in ranking — = Not ranked RV = Received votes
	Week																		
Poll	Pre	1	2	3	4	5	6	7	8	9	10	11	12	13	14	15	16	17	Final
Coaches'	—	—*	—	—	—	RV	—	—	—	RV	—	—	RV	RV	RV	N/A	N/A	N/A	13
Baseball America	—	—	—	—	—	—	—	—	—	—	—	—	—	—	—	—	—	—	14
Collegiate Baseball^	—	—	—	—	—	—	25	—	—	—	—	—	—	—	—	—	—	—	14
NCBWA†	—	—	—	RV	—	—	RV	RV	—	—	—	—	—	RV	RV	RV	N/A	N/A	14

^ Collegiate Baseball ranked 40 teams in their preseason poll, but only ranked 30 teams weekly during the season.
† NCBWA ranks 30 teams in their preseason poll, but only ranks 25 teams weekly during the season.
* A new poll was not released for this week, so for comparison purposes, the previous week's ranking is inserted in this week's slot.

== MLB draft ==
The following members of the 2014 Maryland Terrapins baseball team were eventually selected in the MLB Draft.

Player	Position	Year	Round	Overall	MLB team
Jake Stinnett	RHP	2014	2nd	45th	Chicago Cubs
Ben Brewster	LHP	2014	15th	438th	Chicago White Sox
Charles White	OF	2014	21st	619th	Chicago Cubs
Blake Schmit	SS	2014	26th	770th	Minnesota Twins
