= 2014 Virginia Cavaliers baseball team =

American college baseball season

2014 Virginia Cavaliers baseball

Charlottesville Regional champions Charlottesville Super Regional champions College World Series Final L, 1–2
- Conference: Atlantic Coast Conference
- Record: 53–16 (22–8 ACC)
- Head coach: Brian O'Connor (11th season)
- Assistant coaches: Kevin McMullan (11th season); Karl Kuhn (11th season); Matt Kirby (3rd season)
- Home stadium: Davenport Field

2014 Atlantic Coast Conference baseball standings
	Conf.						Overall
Team	W		L		T	PCT	W		L		T	PCT
Atlantic
No. 21 Florida State ^{x}‍‍‍^{y}	21	–	9	–	0	.700	43	–	17	–	0	.717
No. 16 Maryland ‍‍‍^{y}	15	–	14	–	0	.517	40	–	23	–	0	.635
Clemson ‍‍‍^{y}	15	–	14	–	0	.517	36	–	25	–	0	.590
Wake Forest ‍‍‍	15	–	15	–	0	.500	30	–	26	–	0	.536
NC State ‍‍‍	13	–	17	–	0	.433	32	–	23	–	0	.582
Boston College ‍‍‍	10	–	20	–	0	.333	22	–	33	–	0	.400
Notre Dame ‍‍‍	9	–	21	–	0	.300	22	–	31	–	0	.415
Coastal
No. 22 Miami (FL) ^{x}‍‍‍^{y}	24	–	6	–	0	.800	44	–	19	–	0	.698
No. 2 Virginia ‍‍‍^{y}	22	–	8	–	0	.733	47	–	14	–	0	.770
Duke ‍‍‍	16	–	14	–	0	.533	33	–	25	–	0	.569
North Carolina ‍‍‍^{y}	15	–	15	–	0	.500	35	–	27	–	0	.565
Georgia Tech ‍‍‡‍^{y}	14	–	16	–	0	.467	37	–	27	–	0	.578
Pittsburgh ‍‍‍	11	–	19	–	0	.367	22	–	30	–	0	.423
Virginia Tech ‍‍‍	9	–	21	–	0	.300	21	–	31	–	1	.406
x – Division champion ‡ – Tournament champion y – Invited to the NCAA tournament As of January 16, 2015; Rankings from Collegiate Baseball

The 2014 Virginia Cavaliers baseball team represented the University of Virginia in the 2014 NCAA Division I baseball season. Head coach Brian O'Connor was in his 11th season, and the team played its home games at Davenport Field. They competed in the Atlantic Coast Conference's Coastal Division.

The Cavaliers advanced to the College World Series Finals for the first time in program history, where they were defeated in a best-of-three series by Vanderbilt. Virginia finished the season with a 53–16 record and won both the Charlottesville Regional and Super Regional, advancing to its third College World Series appearance in six seasons. As the tournament's No. 3 national seed, Virginia won four games at the College World Series before reaching the final.

Nathan Kirby was named a First-Team All-American and Co-ACC Pitcher of the Year, and was one of eight Virginia players selected to the All-ACC Team. The team recorded a 2.23 earned run average and a .981 fielding percentage, ranking among the top teams nationally in both categories. Nick Howard set an ACC record with 20 saves and was selected in the first round of the MLB Draft. A total of eight Virginia players were selected in the 2014 MLB Draft. Howard and Mike Papi were also named All-Americans.

== Personnel ==
=== Roster ===
2014 Virginia Cavaliers roster
Pitchers: 6 – Cameron Tekker – Sophomore; 13 – Alec Bettinger – Freshman; 17 – Jack Roberts – Freshman; 19 – Nathan Kirby – Sophomore; 20 – Brandon Waddell – Sophomore; 25 – Adam Bleday – Freshman; 27 – Josh Sborz – Sophomore; 28 – Kevin Doherty – Sophomore; 30 – Connor Jones – Freshman; 34 – Artie Lewicki – Senior; 35 – David Rosenberger – Sophomore; 39 – Austin Young – Senior; 42 – Brett Lisle – (redshirt) Sophomore; 43 – Ben Carraway – Freshman; 47 – Whit Mayberry – (redshirt) Senior	Catchers: 8 – Robbie Coman – Sophomore; 10 – Brandon Downes – Junior; 18 – Nate Irving – Junior; 21 – Matt Thaiss – Freshman; Infielders: 2 – John La Prise – Sophomore; 5 – Tony Butler – Freshman; 7 – Branden Cogswell – Junior; 9 – Kenny Towns – Junior; 22 – Daniel Pinero – Freshman; 33 – Nick Howard – Junior; 37 – Thomas Woodruff – Junior	Outfielders: 3 – Tyler Allen – Freshman; 23 – Derek Fisher – Junior; 31 – Joe McCarthy – Sophomore; 38 – Mike Papi – Junior

=== Coaches ===
2014 Virginia Cavaliers baseball coaching staff
- 26 – Brian O'Connor – Head coach
- 44 – Kevin McMullan – Associate head coach
- 36 – Karl Kuhn – Assistant coach
- 1 – Matt Kirby – Assistant coach

== Schedule ==
2014 Virginia Cavaliers baseball game log
Regular season (43–11)
February (6–2)

Date	Opponent	Rank	Site/stadium	Score	Win	Loss	Save	Attendance	Overall record	ACC record
Feb 14	vs. Kentucky	No. 12	Brooks Field • Wilmington, NC	L 3–8	Reed (1–0)	Waddell (0–1)	None		0–1	
Feb 15	vs. VMI	No. 12	Brooks Field • Wilmington, NC	W 12–0	Kirby (1–0)	Bach (0–1)	None		1–1	
Feb 16	@ UNC Wilmington	No. 12	Brooks Field • Wilmington, NC	W 7–2	Sborz (1–0)	Phillips (0–1)	None	3,826	2–1	
Feb 19	@ William & Mary	No. 9	Plumeri Park • Williamsburg, VA	W 17–2	Lewicki (1–0)	Kauhaahaa (0–1)	None	845	3–1	
Feb 21	East Carolina	No. 9	Davenport Field • Charlottesville, VA	W 3–2	Kirby (2–0)	Hoffman (0–1)	Howard (1)	3,092	4–1	
Feb 22	East Carolina	No. 9	Davenport Field • Charlottesville, VA	W 4–0	Sborz (2–0)	Love (0–1)	None	3,561	5–1	
Feb 23	East Carolina	No. 9	Davenport Field • Charlottesville, VA	W 6–2	Waddell (1–1)	Lucroy (0–2)	None	3,592	6–1	
Feb 25	VMI	No. 6	Davenport Field • Charlottesville, VA	L 2–3	Henkel (1–0)	Mayberry (0–1)	Edens (1)	2,689	6–2	

March (17–2)

Date	Opponent	Rank	Site/stadium	Score	Win	Loss	Save	Attendance	Overall record	ACC record
Mar 1	Monmouth	No. 6	Davenport Field • Charlottesville, VA	W 6–3	Kirby (3–0)	McGee (1–1)	Jones (1)	3,001	7–2	
Mar 2	Monmouth	No. 6	Davenport Field • Charlottesville, VA	W 5–3	Sborz (3–0)	Hunt (0–2)	Howard (2)	3,073	8–2	
Mar 2	Monmouth	No. 6	Davenport Field • Charlottesville, VA	W 6–2^{6}	Waddell (2–1)	Singer (0–2)	None	2,799	9–2	
Mar 8	@ Duke	No. 5	Jack Coombs Field • Durham, NC	W 3–2	Kirby (4–0)	Van Orden (1–1)	Howard (3)		10–2	1–0
Mar 8	@ Duke	No. 5	Jack Coombs Field • Durham, NC	L 2–3	Istler (2–2)	Sborz (3–1)	Huber (3)	882	10–3	1–1
Mar 9	@ Duke	No. 5	Jack Coombs Field • Durham, NC	W 2–1	Waddell (3–1)	Marvel (1–2)	Howard (4)	737	11–2	2–1
Mar 11	James Madison	No. 5	Davenport Field • Charlottesville, VA	W 13–2	Connor (1–0)	Hoover (0–2)	None	3,112	12–3	
Mar 14	Boston College	No. 5	Davenport Field • Charlottesville, VA	W 8–1	Kirby (5–0)	Gorman (2–3)	None	3,002	13–3	3–1
Mar 15	Boston College	No. 5	Davenport Field • Charlottesville, VA	W 3–2	Howard (1–0)	Poore (0–2)	None	3,351	14–3	4–1
Mar 15	Boston College	No. 5	Davenport Field • Charlottesville, VA	W 2–1	Mayberry (1–1)	Stevens (0–3)	None	3,228	15–3	5–1
Mar 18	Rutgers	No. 4	Davenport Field • Charlottesville, VA	Canceled						
Mar 19	Towson	No. 4	Davenport Field • Charlottesville, VA	W 5–3	Rosenberger (1–0)	Patton (0–2)	Howard (5)	2,567	16–3	
Mar 20	Princeton	No. 4	Davenport Field • Charlottesville, VA	W 14–4	Bettinger (1–0)	Foote (0–2)	None	2,670	17–3	
Mar 22	@ Miami (FL)	No. 4	Alex Rodriguez Park at Mark Light Field • Coral Gables, FL	L 1–7	Diaz (5–0)	Kirby (5–1)	Garcia (6)	3,337	17–4	5–2
Mar 23	@ Miami (FL)	No. 4	Mark Light Field at Alex Rodriguez Park • Coral Gables, FL	W 8–3^{11}	Jones (2–0)	Sosa (0–1)	Mayberry (1)	2,812	18–4	6–2
Mar 24	@ Miami (FL)	No. 4	Mark Light Field at Alex Rodriguez Park • Coral Gables, FL	W 5–3	Jones (3–0)	Garcia (2–2)	Howard (6)	2,607	19–4	7–2
Mar 26	Longwood	No. 4	Davenport Field • Charlottesville, VA	W 8–1	Bettinger (2–0)	Gould (1–1)	None	2,737	20–4	
Mar 28	Virginia Tech	No. 4	Davenport Field • Charlottesville, VA	W 2–1	Mayberry (2–1)	Markey (2–4)	Howard (7)	3,414	21–4	8–2
Mar 29	Virginia Tech	No. 4	Davenport Field • Charlottesville, VA	W 9–2	Jones (4–0)	Keselica (2–1)	None	3,587	22–4	9–2
Mar 30	Virginia Tech	No. 4	Davenport Field • Charlottesville, VA	W 7–4	Mayberry (3–1)	Kennedy (1–1)	Howard (8)	3,730	23–4	10–2

April (14–5)

Date	Opponent	Rank	Site/stadium	Score	Win	Loss	Save	Attendance	Overall record	ACC record
Apr 1	Old Dominion	No. 3	Davenport Field • Charlottesville, VA	W 7–1	Bettinger (3–0)	Tomchick (1–1)	None	3,422	24–4	
Apr 2	George Washington	No. 3	Davenport Field • Charlottesville, VA	W 10–0	Lewicki (2–0)	Olson	None		25–4	
Apr 4	@ Pittsburgh	No. 3	Petersen Sports Complex • Pittsburgh, PA	W 4–0	Kirby (6–1)	Aldenhoven (2–2)	None	402	26–4	11–2
Apr 5	@ Pittsburgh	No. 3	Petersen Sports Complex • Pittsburgh, PA	L 1–2	Harris (3–3)	Jones (4–1)	None	900	26–5	11–3
Apr 6	@ Pittsburgh	No. 3	Petersen Sports Complex • Pittsburgh, PA	W 3–0	Waddell (4–1)	Wotherspoon (3–4)	Howard (9)	900	27–5	12–3
Apr 8	@ James Madison	No. 3	Eagle Field at Veterans Memorial Park • Harrisonburg, VA	W 9–3	Bettinger (4–0)	Garner (0–1)	None	1,632	28–5	
Apr 11	No. 22 Clemson	No. 3	Davenport Field • Charlottesville, VA	W 3–2	Kirby (7–1)	Crownover (6–3)	Howard (10)	4,221	29–5	13–3
Apr 12	No. 22 Clemson	No. 3	Davenport Field • Charlottesville, VA	L 1–7	Gossett (4–0)	Sborz (3–2)	None	4,886	29–6	13–4
Apr 13	No. 22 Clemson	No. 3	Davenport Field • Charlottesville, VA	W 1–0	Waddell (5–1)	Long (2–1)	Howard (11)	4,840	30–6	14–4
Apr 15	Radford	No. 2	Davenport Field • Charlottesville, VA	Canceled						
Apr 16	William & Mary	No. 2	Davenport Field • Charlottesville, VA	W 11–2	Lewicki (3–0)	Powers (0–1)	None	2,969	31–6	
Apr 18	North Carolina	No. 2	Davenport Field • Charlottesville, VA	W 3–2	Kirby (8–1)	Thornton (7–2)	Howard (12)	4,576	32–6	15–4
Apr 19	North Carolina	No. 2	Davenport Field • Charlottesville, VA	W 3–1	Sborz (4–2)	Moss (2–2)	Howard (12)	5,025	33–6	16–4
Apr 20	North Carolina	No. 2	Davenport Field • Charlottesville, VA	L 2–4	Gallen (4–3)	Waddell (5–2)	Hovis (3)	4,681	33–7	16–5
Apr 22	@ VCU	No. 2	The Diamond • Richmond, VA	W 4–5^{10}	Howard (2–0)	Lees (5–3)	Mayberry (2)	3,756	34–7	
Apr 23	Richmond	No. 2	Davenport Field • Charlottesville, VA	W 13–0	Bettinger (5–0)	Baker (1–1)	None	3,326	35–7	
Apr 25	@ No. 6 Florida State	No. 2	Mike Martin Field at Dick Howser Stadium • Tallahassee, FL	W 5–3^{10}	Mayberry (4–1)	Smith (4–1)	Howard (14)	4,852	36–7	17–5
Apr 26	@ No. 6 Florida State	No. 2	Mike Martin Field at Dick Howser Stadium • Tallahassee, FL	L 0–7	Compton (4–1)	Sborz (4–3)	None	5,572	36–8	17–6
Apr 27	@ No. 6 Florida State	No. 2	Mike Martin Field at Dick Howser Stadium • Tallahassee, FL	W 4–3	Waddell (6–2)	Holtmann (5–1)	Howard (15)	4,791	37–8	18–6
Apr 29	@ Old Dominion	No. 1	Harbor Park • Norfolk, VA	L 1–8	Harris (1–1)	Lewicki (3–1)	None	2,937	37–9	

May (6–2)

Date	Opponent	Rank	Site/stadium	Score	Win	Loss	Save	Attendance	Overall record	ACC record
May 7	No. 29 Liberty	No. 2	Davenport Field • Charlottesville, VA	W 8–2	Lewicki (4–1)	Lyons (2–4)	None	4,354	38–9	
May 9	Georgia Tech	No. 2	Davenport Field • Charlottesville, VA	W 4–3	Young (1–0)	Heddinger (3–3)	Howard (16)	4,040	39–9	19–6
May 10	Georgia Tech	No. 2	Davenport Field • Charlottesville, VA	W 4–3^{11}	Mayberry (5–1)	Roberts (0–2)	None	4,179	40–9	20–6
May 11	Georgia Tech	No. 2	Davenport Field • Charlottesville, VA	W 3–1	Waddell (7–2)	Parr (4–3)	Howard (17)	4,698	41–9	21–6
May 13	VCU	No. 2	Davenport Field • Charlottesville, VA	W 12–3	Bettinger (6–0)	Kanuik (2–1)	None	3,775	42–9	
May 16	@ Wake Forest	No. 2	Gene Hooks Field at Wake Forest Baseball Park • Winston-Salem, NC	L 5–6^{10}	Dunshee (4–1)	Howard (2–1)	None		42–10	21–7
May 16	@ Wake Forest	No. 2	Gene Hooks Field at Wake Forest Baseball Park • Winston-Salem, NC	W 7–2	Lewicki (5–1)	Pirro (2–2)	None	1,213	43–10	22–7
May 17	@ Wake Forest	No. 2	Gene Hooks Field at Wake Forest Baseball Park • Winston-Salem, NC	L 3–4	Tishman (1–2)	Waddell (7–3)	Dunshee (1)	1,322	43–11	22–8

Postseason (10–5)
ACC Tournament (1–2)

Date	Opponent	Seed Rank	Site/stadium	Score	Win	Loss	Save	Attendance	Overall record	ACCT record
May 22	(6) Maryland	(3) No. 4	NewBridge Bank Park • Greensboro, NC	L 6–7	Stinnett (7–6)	Rosenberger (1–1)	Mooney (10)	3,408	43–12	0–1
May 23	(7) North Carolina	(3) No. 4	NewBridge Bank Park • Greensboro, NC	W 3–2	Mayberry (6–1)	Rice (2–3)	Howard (18)	5,783	44–12	1–1
May 25	(2) No. 6 Florida State	(3) No. 4	NewBridge Bank Park • Greensboro, NC	L 4–6	Smith (5–2)	Sborz (4–4)	Winston (7)	5,298	44–13	1–2

Charlottesville Regional (3–0)

Date	Opponent	Seed Rank	Site/stadium	Score	Win	Loss	Save	Attendance	Overall record	NCAAT record
May 30	(4) Bucknell	(1) No. 4	Davenport Field • Charlottesville, VA	W 10–1	Lewicki (6–1)	Hough (8–4)	None	3,569	45–13	1–0
May 31	(2) No. 23 Arkansas	(1) No. 4	Davenport Field • Charlottesville, VA	W 3–0	Kirby (9–1)	Killian (4–9)	Howard (19)	4,579	46–13	2–0
June 1	(2) No. 23 Arkansas	(1) No. 4	Davenport Field • Charlottesville, VA	W 9–2	Waddell (8–3)	Jackson (2–3)	None	4,005	47–13	3–0

Charlottesville Super Regional (2–1)

Date	Opponent	National Seed Rank	Site/stadium	Score	Win	Loss	Save	Attendance	Overall record	NCAAT record
June 7	No. 13 Maryland	(3) No. 2	Davenport Field • Charlottesville, VA	L 4–5	Stinnett (8–6)	Kirby (9–2)	Mooney (13)	5,001	47–14	3–1
June 8	No. 13 Maryland	(3) No. 2	Davenport Field • Charlottesville, VA	W 7–3	Waddell (9–3)	Shawaryn (11–4)	Lewicki (1)	5,001	48–14	4–1
June 9	No. 13 Maryland	(3) No. 2	Davenport Field • Charlottesville, VA	W 11–2	Sborz (5–4)	Ruse (7–3)	None	5,001	49–14	5–1

College World Series (1–2)

Date	Opponent	National Seed Rank	Site/stadium	Score	Win	Loss	Save	Attendance	Overall record	CWS record
June 15	No. 4 Ole Miss	(3) No. 1	TD Ameritrade Park • Omaha, NE	W 2–1	Lewicki (7–1)	Greenwood (3–2)	None	23,393	50–14	1–0
June 17	(7) No. 2 TCU	(3) No. 1	TD Ameritrade Park • Omaha, NE	W 3–2	Lewicki (8–1)	Teakell (6–1)	None	24,285	51–14	2–0
June 21	No. 4 Ole Miss	(3) No. 1	TD Ameritrade Park • Omaha, NE	W 4–1	Sborz (6–4)	Ellis (10–3)	Howard (20)	22,924	52–14	3–0
June 23	No. 5 Vanderbilt	(3) No. 1	TD Ameritrade Park • Omaha, NE	L 8–9	Miller (7–2)	Kirby (9–3)	Ravenelle (2)	20,755	52–15	3–1
June 24	No. 5 Vanderbilt	(3) No. 1	TD Ameritrade Park • Omaha, NE	W 7–2	Waddell (10–3)	Beede (8–8)	None	24,308	53–15	4–1
June 25	No. 5 Vanderbilt	(3) No. 1	TD Ameritrade Park • Omaha, NE	L 2–3	Stone (4–0)	Howard (2–2)	Ravenelle (3)	18,344	53–16	4–2

== Ranking Movements ==
Ranking movements Legend: ██ Increase in ranking ██ Decrease in ranking
	Week																		
Poll	Pre	1	2	3	4	5	6	7	8	9	10	11	12	13	14	15	16	17	Final
Coaches'	6	6*		3	5	5	2	1	2	1	1	1	1	1	3	4			
Baseball America	1	1	1	1	3	3	3	3	2	1	1	1	1	1	3	8			
Collegiate Baseball^	12	9	6	5	5	4	4	3	3	2	2	1	2	2	4	4	2	1	
NCBWA†	2	4	1	1	3	3	1	1	1	1	1	1	2	2	3	3	2		

^ Collegiate Baseball ranked 40 teams in their preseason poll, but only ranked 30 teams weekly during the season.
† NCBWA ranks 30 teams in their preseason poll, but only ranks 25 teams weekly during the season.
* A new poll was not released for this week, so for comparison purposes, the previous week's ranking is inserted in this week's slot.
