= 2014 Atlantic Coast Conference baseball tournament =

American college baseball tournament

- 2014 ACC Baseball Tournament
- Format: Round-robin tournament
- Finals site: NewBridge Bank Park; Greensboro, NC
- Champions: Georgia Tech (9th title)
- Winning coach: Danny Hall (5th title)
- MVP: Dusty Isaacs (Georgia Tech)
- Attendance: 57,343
- Television: ACCRSN, ESPN3, ESPN2

2014 Atlantic Coast Conference baseball standings
	Conf.						Overall
Team	W		L		T	PCT	W		L		T	PCT
Atlantic
No. 21 Florida State ^{x}‍‍‍^{y}	21	–	9	–	0	.700	43	–	17	–	0	.717
No. 16 Maryland ‍‍‍^{y}	15	–	14	–	0	.517	40	–	23	–	0	.635
Clemson ‍‍‍^{y}	15	–	14	–	0	.517	36	–	25	–	0	.590
Wake Forest ‍‍‍	15	–	15	–	0	.500	30	–	26	–	0	.536
NC State ‍‍‍	13	–	17	–	0	.433	32	–	23	–	0	.582
Boston College ‍‍‍	10	–	20	–	0	.333	22	–	33	–	0	.400
Notre Dame ‍‍‍	9	–	21	–	0	.300	22	–	31	–	0	.415
Coastal
No. 22 Miami (FL) ^{x}‍‍‍^{y}	24	–	6	–	0	.800	44	–	19	–	0	.698
No. 2 Virginia ‍‍‍^{y}	22	–	8	–	0	.733	47	–	14	–	0	.770
Duke ‍‍‍	16	–	14	–	0	.533	33	–	25	–	0	.569
North Carolina ‍‍‍^{y}	15	–	15	–	0	.500	35	–	27	–	0	.565
Georgia Tech ‍‍‡‍^{y}	14	–	16	–	0	.467	37	–	27	–	0	.578
Pittsburgh ‍‍‍	11	–	19	–	0	.367	22	–	30	–	0	.423
Virginia Tech ‍‍‍	9	–	21	–	0	.300	21	–	31	–	1	.406
x – Division champion ‡ – Tournament champion y – Invited to the NCAA tournament As of January 16, 2015; Rankings from Collegiate Baseball

The 2014 Atlantic Coast Conference baseball tournament was held from May 20 through 25 at NewBridge Bank Park in Greensboro, North Carolina. The annual tournament determines the conference champion of the Division I Atlantic Coast Conference for college baseball. Georgia Tech won their ninth tournament championship to earn the league's automatic bid to the 2014 NCAA Division I baseball tournament. This is the last of 19 athletic championship events held by the conference in the 2013–14 academic year. With the victory, Georgia Tech tied Clemson for the most tournament championships.

The tournament has been held every year but one since 1973, with Clemson and Georgia Tech now tied for the most championships, each winning nine. Charter league members Duke and Maryland, along with recent entrants Virginia Tech and Boston College have never won the event. Pittsburgh and Notre Dame played their first season in the ACC in 2014.

== Format and seeding ==
The winner of each seven team division and the top eight other teams based on conference winning percentage, regardless of division, from the conference's regular season were seeded one through ten. Seeds one and two were awarded to the two division winners. The bottom four seeds played an opening round, with the winners advancing to pool play. The winner of each pool played a single championship.

The NCAA approved the use of experimental instant replay rules during the event. These rules are generally only in force during the College World Series, and allow umpires to use video to review fair/foul, home run, and spectator interference calls.

Atlantic Division
Team	W	L	Pct	GB	Seed
Florida State	21	9	.700	–	2
Clemson	15	14	.517	5.5	5
Maryland	15	14	.517	5.5	6
Wake Forest	15	15	.500	6	8
NC State	13	17	.433	8	10
Boston College	10	20	.333	11	–
Notre Dame	9	21	.300	12	–

Coastal Division
Team	W	L	Pct	GB	Seed
Miami (FL)	24	6	.800	–	1
Virginia	22	8	.733	2	3
Duke	16	14	.533	8	4
North Carolina	15	15	.500	9	7
Georgia Tech	14	16	.467	10	9
Pittsburgh	11	19	.367	13	–
Virginia Tech	9	21	.300	15	–

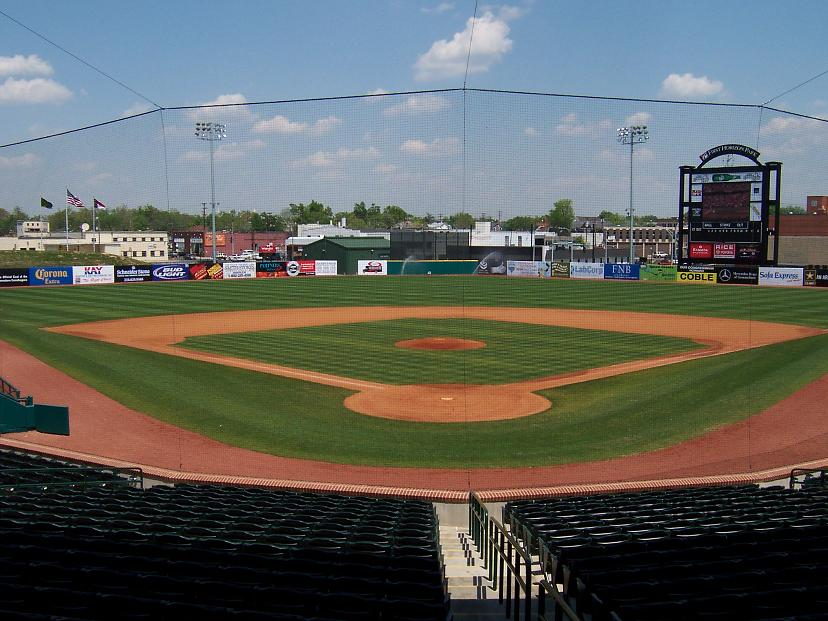
NewBridge Bank Park, the home of the 2014 ACC Baseball Championship.

== Schedule and results ==
All times shown are US EDT.

=== Pool Play ===
	Division A	UM	DUKE	CLEM	GT	Overall
1	Miami (FL)		W 6–5	L 2–3	L 3–6	1–2
4	Duke	L 5–6		L 3–5	W 6–0	1–2
5	Clemson	W 3–2	W 5–3		L 0–3	2–1^{1}
8	Georgia Tech	W 6–3	L 0–6	W 3–0		2–1^{1}

	Division B	FSU	UVA	UMD	UNC	Overall
2	Florida State		W 6–4	L 3–5	W 7–1	2–1^{2}
3	Virginia	L 4–6		L 6–7	W 3–2	1–2
6	Maryland	W 5–3	W 7–6		L 7–13	2–1^{2}
7	North Carolina	L 1–7	L 2–3	W 13–7		1–2

Finals
A	Georgia Tech	9
B	Maryland	4

1 - Georgia Tech beat Clemson head-to-head 2 - Maryland beat Florida State head-to-head

== Results ==
=== Play-In Round ===
Tuesday, May 20 3:00 p.m.
Team	1	2	3	4	5	6	7	8	9	R	H	E
#9 Georgia Tech	0	5	0	0	0	0	0	0	0	5	13	0
#8 Wake Forest	0	0	1	0	2	0	0	0	0	3	11	1
WP: Sam Clay (4–1) LP: Jack Fischer (4–7) Sv: Dusty Isaacs (6); Home runs: GT: None; WF: None; Attendance: 2,214; Notes: GT advances into Pool Play, WF is eliminated. Game Duration - 2:55; Boxscore

Tuesday, May 20 11:00 a.m.
Team	1	2	3	4	5	6	7	8	9	R	H	E
#10 North Carolina State	1	0	0	2	0	0	0	0	0	3	7	0
#7 North Carolina	0	1	3	0	0	0	0	0	X	4	8	3
WP: Zach Rice (2–2) LP: Eric Peterson (4–4) Sv: Trent Thornton (1); Home runs: NCSU: None; UNC: Skye Bolt (3); Attendance: 5,822; Notes: UNC advances into Pool Play, NCSU is eliminated. Game Duration - 3:50; Boxscore

=== Pool A ===
Wednesday, May 21 11:00 a.m.
Team	1	2	3	4	5	6	7	8	9	R	H	E
#5 Clemson	0	0	0	1	2	0	0	0	2	5	10	0
#4 Duke	0	2	0	0	0	0	0	0	1	3	6	2
WP: Matthew Crownover (8–5) LP: Michael Matuella (1–3) Sv: Matt Campbell (8); Home runs: CLEM: None; DUKE: Ryan Deitrich (8); Attendance: 3,492; Notes: Game Duration - 3:12; Boxscore

Wednesday, May 21 3:00 p.m.
Team	1	2	3	4	5	6	7	8	9	R	H	E
#9 Georgia Tech	0	0	0	0	1	0	2	2	1	6	14	0
#1 Miami (FL)	0	0	1	0	2	0	0	0	0	3	9	1
WP: Josh Heddinger (4–4) LP: Cooper Hammond (5–1) Sv: Dusty Isaacs (7); Home runs: GT: None; UM: Dale Carey; Attendance: 2,469; Notes: Game Duration - 2:19; Boxscore

Thursday, May 22 3:00 p.m.
Team	1	2	3	4	5	6	7	8	9	R	H	E
#4 Duke	0	0	0	1	1	0	2	1	1	6	14	1
#9 Georgia Tech	0	0	0	0	0	0	0	0	0	0	5	0
WP: Drew Van Orden (6–5) LP: Ben Parr (5–4); Home runs: DUKE: Andy Perez (2), Jordan Betts (5), Ryan Deitrich (9); GT: None; Attendance: 2,582; Notes: Game Duration - 2:52; Boxscore

Thursday, May 22 7:00 p.m.
Team	1	2	3	4	5	6	7	8	9	R	H	E
#1 Miami (FL)	0	0	2	0	0	0	0	0	0	2	8	0
#5 Clemson	0	0	1	0	0	1	0	0	1	3	10	2
WP: Drew Moyer (5–1) LP: Bryan Garcia (5–4); Home runs: UM: None; CLEM: Jon McGibbon (3); Attendance: 3,417; Notes: Game Duration - 3:20; Boxscore

Friday, May 23 3:00 p.m.
Team	1	2	3	4	5	6	7	8	9	R	H	E
#9 Georgia Tech	0	0	0	0	1	0	0	0	2	3	9	0
#5 Clemson	0	0	0	0	0	0	0	0	0	0	4	3
WP: Dusty Isaacs (7–5) LP: Clate Schmidt (5–7) Sv: Sam Clay (8); Home runs: GT: Mott Hyde (4); CLEM: None; Attendance: 2,859; Notes: Game Duration - 2:26; Boxscore

Saturday, May 24 11:00 a.m.
Team	1	2	3	4	5	6	7	8	9	10	11	12	R	H	E
#1 Miami (FL)	2	0	0	0	1	0	0	1	0	0	0	2	6	13	0
#4 Duke	0	1	0	0	1	0	0	0	2	0	0	1	5	12	0
WP: Bryan Garcia (6–4) LP: Andrew Istler (8–8) Sv: Javi Salas (1); Home runs: UM: Zach Collins (9); DUKE: Cristian Perez (1); Attendance: 3,572; Notes: Game Duration - 4:23; Boxscore

=== Pool B ===
Wednesday, May 21 7:00 p.m.
Team	1	2	3	4	5	6	7	8	9	R	H	E
#7 North Carolina	0	0	0	0	0	0	1	0	0	1	6	1
#2 Florida State	0	1	0	4	0	1	1	0	X	7	9	2
WP: Billy Strode (2–1) LP: Taylore Cherry (2–3); Home runs: UNC: None; FSU: John Nogowski (5), Justin Gonzalez (3); Attendance: 4,738; Notes: Game Duration - 2:24; Boxscore

Thursday, May 22 11:00 a.m.
Team	1	2	3	4	5	6	7	8	9	R	H	E
#6 Maryland	1	0	0	0	2	1	2	1	0	7	8	1
#3 Virginia	0	2	0	0	1	1	0	0	2	6	12	0
WP: Jake Stinnett (7–6) LP: David Rosenberger (1–1) Sv: Kevin Mooney (10); Home runs: UMD: Charlie White (2), LaMonte Wade (2), Kevin Martir (3); UVA: Joe McCarthy (6), Derek Fisher (3); Attendance: 3,408; Notes: Game Duration - 3:05; Boxscore

Friday, May 23 11:00 a.m.
Team	1	2	3	4	5	6	7	8	9	R	H	E
#2 Florida State	0	0	0	0	0	0	0	3	0	3	4	3
#6 Maryland	0	0	4	0	0	0	1	0	X	5	7	1
WP: Mike Shawaryn (10–3) LP: Mike Compton (7–2) Sv: Kevin Mooney (11); Home runs: FSU: None; UMD: None; Attendance: 3,531; Notes: Game Duration - 3:07; Boxscore

Friday, May 23 7:00 p.m.
Team	1	2	3	4	5	6	7	8	9	R	H	E
#3 Virginia	0	0	0	1	0	0	1	1	0	3	6	1
#7 North Carolina	0	0	0	0	0	0	2	0	0	2	9	2
WP: Whit Mayberry (6–1) LP: Zach Rice (2–3) Sv: Nick Howard (18); Home runs: UVA: None; UNC: Wood Myers (1); Attendance: 5,783; Notes: Game Duration - 3:41; Boxscore

Saturday, May 24 3:00 p.m.
Team	1	2	3	4	5	6	7	8	9	R	H	E
#6 Maryland	0	0	2	0	0	0	5	0	0	7	13	3
#7 North Carolina	1	2	0	0	4	0	0	6	X	13	15	0
WP: Reilly Hovis (8–1) LP: Robert Galligan (0–1); Home runs: UMD: Kevin Martir (4); UNC: None; Attendance: 3,972; Notes: Game Duration - 3:14; Boxscore

Saturday, May 24 7:00 p.m.
Team	1	2	3	4	5	6	7	8	9	R	H	E
#3 Virginia	0	0	3	0	0	1	0	0	0	4	8	1
#2 Florida State	0	1	0	0	0	0	4	1	X	6	8	0
WP: Gage Smith (5–2) LP: Josh Sborz (4–4) Sv: Jameis Winston (7); Home runs: UVA: Brandon Downes (7); FSU: None; Attendance: 5,298; Notes: Game Duration - 3:08; Boxscore

=== Championship game ===
Sunday, May 25 1:00 p.m.
Team	1	2	3	4	5	6	7	8	9	R	H	E
#9 Georgia Tech	2	0	0	1	0	0	1	3	2	9	13	0
#6 Maryland	0	1	0	1	0	2	0	0	0	4	9	1
WP: Jonathan Roberts (1–2) LP: Kevin Mooney (1–2); Home runs: GT: None; UMD: Blake Schmit (1); Attendance: 4,186; Notes: Game Duration - 3:26; Boxscore

== 2014 All-ACC Tournament Team ==
Eleven players were named to the All-ACC Tournament team.

Player	School	Position
Kevin Martir	Maryland	C
LaMonte Wade	Maryland	1B
Mott Hyde	Georgia Tech	2B
Landon Lassiter	North Carolina	3B
Blake Schmit	Maryland	SS
Ryan Deitrich	Duke	OF
Daniel Spingola	Georgia Tech	OF
Dale Carey	Miami (FL)	OF
Nick Howard	Virginia	UT/DH
Drew Van Orden	Duke	P
Dusty Isaacs	Georgia Tech	P

=== Most Valuable Player ===
Dusty Isaacs was named Tournament Most Valuable Player. Isaacs was a pitcher for Georgia Tech.
