= 2014 Florida State Seminoles baseball team =

American college baseball season

2014 Florida State Seminoles baseball

ACC Atlantic Division Champion

Tallahassee Regional
- Conference: Atlantic Coast Conference
- Atlantic Division

Ranking
- Coaches: No. 21
- CB: No. 23
- Record: 43–17 (21–9 ACC)
- Head coach: Mike Martin (35th season)
- Assistant coach: Mike Martin, Jr. (17th season)
- Pitching coach: Mike Bell (3rd season)
- Captain: Justin Gonzalez
- Home stadium: Mike Martin Field at Dick Howser Stadium (Capacity: 6,700)

2014 Atlantic Coast Conference baseball standings
	Conf.						Overall
Team	W		L		T	PCT	W		L		T	PCT
Atlantic
No. 21 Florida State ^{x}‍‍‍^{y}	21	–	9	–	0	.700	43	–	17	–	0	.717
No. 16 Maryland ‍‍‍^{y}	15	–	14	–	0	.517	40	–	23	–	0	.635
Clemson ‍‍‍^{y}	15	–	14	–	0	.517	36	–	25	–	0	.590
Wake Forest ‍‍‍	15	–	15	–	0	.500	30	–	26	–	0	.536
NC State ‍‍‍	13	–	17	–	0	.433	32	–	23	–	0	.582
Boston College ‍‍‍	10	–	20	–	0	.333	22	–	33	–	0	.400
Notre Dame ‍‍‍	9	–	21	–	0	.300	22	–	31	–	0	.415
Coastal
No. 22 Miami (FL) ^{x}‍‍‍^{y}	24	–	6	–	0	.800	44	–	19	–	0	.698
No. 2 Virginia ‍‍‍^{y}	22	–	8	–	0	.733	47	–	14	–	0	.770
Duke ‍‍‍	16	–	14	–	0	.533	33	–	25	–	0	.569
North Carolina ‍‍‍^{y}	15	–	15	–	0	.500	35	–	27	–	0	.565
Georgia Tech ‍‍‡‍^{y}	14	–	16	–	0	.467	37	–	27	–	0	.578
Pittsburgh ‍‍‍	11	–	19	–	0	.367	22	–	30	–	0	.423
Virginia Tech ‍‍‍	9	–	21	–	0	.300	21	–	31	–	1	.406
x – Division champion ‡ – Tournament champion y – Invited to the NCAA tournament As of January 16, 2015; Rankings from Collegiate Baseball

The 2014 Florida State Seminoles baseball team represented Florida State University in the 2014 NCAA Division I baseball season. The Seminoles played their home games at Mike Martin Field at Dick Howser Stadium, named for 35th year head coach Mike Martin. It was the Seminoles' 23rd season as a member of the ACC and its 9th in the ACC Atlantic Division.

Florida State achieved forty wins for the thirty-seventh straight year and twenty conference wins for the seventh time in school history. The Seminoles made an appearance in the NCAA tournament for the fifty-second time, their thirty-seventh straight tournament appearance. Florida State was chosen as a national seed for the tenth time and hosted a regional for the thirty-first time.

== Personnel ==
=== Roster ===
2014 Florida State Seminoles roster
Pitchers: 5 - Billy Strode - Junior; 7 - Luke Weaver - Junior; 9 - Andy Ward - Freshman; 16 - Taylor Blatch - Freshman; 17 - Mike Compton - (redshirt) Sophomore; 18 - Ed Voyles - Freshman; 19 - Gage Smith - (redshirt) Senior; 24 - Dylan Silva - Sophomore; 30 - Will Zirzow - Freshman; 31 - Alec Byrd - Freshman; 33 - Bryant Holtmann - Junior; 36 - Kenny Burkhead - Sophomore; 37 - Brandon Leibrandt - Junior; 40 - Peter Miller - Senior; 42 - Jim Voyles - Freshman; 44 - Jameis Winston - Sophomore; 51 - Brandon Johnson - Senior	Catchers: 13 - Danny De La Calle - Junior; 20 - Gage West - Freshman; 28 - Lee Howard - Junior; 32 - Ladson Montgomery - Senior; Infielders: 3 - John Nogowski - Junior; 10 - Justin Gonzalez - (redshirt) Senior; 12 - John Sansone - Sophomore; 15 - Hank Truluck - Freshman; 21 - Ben DeLuzio - Freshman; 43 - Casey Smit - Senior; 53 - Jose Brizuela - Junior	Outfielders: 1 - Nick Graganella - (redshirt) Sophomore; 2 - Josh Delph - Junior; 8 - D. J. Stewart - Sophomore; 25 - Brett Knief - (redshirt) Senior; 27 - Matt Mulroy - Junior

=== Coaches ===
2014 Florida State Seminoles baseball coaching staff
- 11 - Mike Martin – Head coach – 35th season
- 22 - Mike Bell - Associate head coach / Pitchers - 3rd season
- 4 - Mike Martin, Jr. - Assistant coach/recruiting coordinator - 17th season
- 23 - Bryan Henry - Volunteer assistant coach - 1st season

== Schedule ==
The Seminoles played a three-game series against Miami, despite the ACC not scheduling conference games between the two schools. The three games did not count in ACC standings.

Florida State was selected as the fifth overall seed in the NCAA tournament.

2014 Florida State Seminoles baseball game log
Regular season (41–14)
February (6–1)

Date	Opponent	Rank	Site/stadium	Score	Win	Loss	Save	Attendance	Overall Record	ACC Record
February 14	Niagara	No. 5	Dick Howser Stadium • Tallahassee, FL	**W** 13–2	**Weaver (1–0)**	Schwartz (0–1)	None	5,756	1–0	—
February 15	Niagara	No. 5	Dick Howser Stadium • Tallahassee, FL	**W** 4–1	**Leibrandt (1–0)**	Fittry (0–1)	**Winston (1)**	5,511	2–0	—
February 16	Niagara	No. 5	Dick Howser Stadium • Tallahassee, FL	**W** 13–0^{8}	**Compton (1–0)**	Stroud (0–1)	None	4,578	3–0	—
February 18	at Jacksonville	No. 5	John Sessions Stadium • Jacksonville, FL	**W** 12–6	**Holtman (1–0)**	Gordon (0–2)	None	3,000	4–0	—
February 21	Georgia	No. 5	Dick Howser Stadium • Tallahassee, FL	**W** 8–3	**Weaver (2–0)**	Lawlor (1–1)	None	5,024	5–0	—
February 22	Georgia	No. 5	Dick Howser Stadium • Tallahassee, FL	**W** 10–4	**Smith (1–0)**	Cheek (0–2)	None	6,568	6–0	—
February 23	Georgia	No. 5	Dick Howser Stadium • Tallahassee, FL	Cancelled						
February 28	No. 17 Miami (FL)	No. 2	Dick Howser Stadium • Tallahassee, FL	**L** 1–3	Diaz (3–0)	**Weaver (2–1)**	Garcia (3)	5,599	6–1	—

March (16–4)

Date	Opponent	Rank	Site/stadium	Score	Win	Loss	Save	Attendance	Overall Record	ACC Record
March 1	No. 17 Miami (FL)	No. 2	Dick Howser Stadium • Tallahassee, FL	**W** 10–2	**Leibrandt (2–0)**	Radziewski (0–2)	None	6,593	7–1	—
March 2	No. 17 Miami (FL)	No. 2	Dick Howser Stadium • Tallahassee, FL	**W** 13–6	**Smith (2–0)**	Salcines (0–1)	None	5,902	8–1	—
March 4	at South Florida	No. 2	USF Baseball Stadium • Tampa, FL	**W** 5–1	**Miller (1–0)**	Serrallonga (1–1)	None	3,615	9–1	—
March 5	at South Florida	No. 2	USF Baseball Stadium • Tampa, FL	**W** 4–1	**Hotlmann (2–0)**	Herget (2–2)	**Winston (2)**	2,261	10–1	—
March 7	Maryland	No. 2	Dick Howser Stadium • Tallahassee, FL	**W** 15–3	**Weaver (3–1)**	Stinnett (2–2)	None	4,056	11–1	1–0
March 8	Maryland	No. 2	Dick Howser Stadium • Tallahassee, FL	**L** 1–5	Shawaryn (4–0)	**Leibrandt (2–1)**	None	4,801	11–2	1–1
March 9	Maryland	No. 2	Dick Howser Stadium • Tallahassee, FL	**W** 7–0	**Compton (2–0)**	Price (1–2)	None	4,059	12–2	2–1
March 11	at UCF	No. 2	Jay Bergman Field • Orlando, FL	**W** 11–10	**Silva (1–0)**	Thompson (0–3)	**Winston (3)**	3,953	13–2	—
March 12	at UCF	No. 2	Jay Bergman Field • Orlando, FL	**W** 18–1	**Holtmann (3–0)**	Martin (0–1)	None	3,105	14–2	—
March 14	No. 6 NC State	No. 2	Dick Howser Stadium • Tallahassee, FL	**W** 6–1	**Weaver (4–1)**	Rodon (2–3)	None	4,504	15–2	3–1
March 15	No. 6 NC State	No. 2	Dick Howser Stadium • Tallahassee, FL	**W** 8–2	**Leibrandt (3–1)**	Jernigan (3–1)	None	5,481	16–2	4–1
March 15	No. 6 NC State	No. 2	Dick Howser Stadium • Tallahassee, FL	**W** 9–8^{13}	**Burkhead (1–0)**	Peterson (1–1)	None	5,481	17–2	5–1
March 18	at Florida	No. 2	Alfred A. McKethan Stadium • Gainesville, FL	**L** 1–3	Rhodes (2–0)	**Miller (1–1)**	Poyner (1)	5,657	17–3	—
March 21	at No. 26 Clemson	No. 2	Doug Kingsmore Stadium • Clemson, SC	**L** 3–9	Gossett (2–0)	**Weaver (4–2)**	None	4,948	17–4	5–2
March 22	at No. 26 Clemson	No. 2	Doug Kingsmore Stadium • Clemson, SC	**W** 11–1	**Leibrandt (4–1)**	Crownover (4–2)	None	6,016	18–4	6–2
March 22	at No. 26 Clemson	No. 2	Doug Kingsmore Stadium • Clemson, SC	**W** 4-3	**Smith (3–0)**	Schmidt (2–4)	**Winston (4)**	6,016	19–4	7–2
March 25	vs. Florida	No. 3	Baseball Grounds of Jacksonville • Jacksonville, FL	**L** 1–4	Young (3–0)	**Miller (1–2)**	Harris (4)	10,125	19–5	—
March 28	at Boston College	No. 3	Bill Beck Field (University of Rhode Island) • Kingston, RI	**W** 6–0	**Weaver (5–2)**	Gorman (2–4)	None	313	20–5	8–2
March 28	at Boston College	No. 3	Bill Beck Field (University of Rhode Island) • Kingston, RI	**W** 11–7	**Voyles (1–0)**	Nicklas (1–2)	None	178	21–5	9–2
March 29	at Boston College	No. 3	Bill Beck Field (University of Rhode Island) • Kingston, RI	**W** 10–1	**Holtmann (4–0)**	Burke (0–3)	**Johnson (1)**	245	22–5	10–2

April (11–6)

Date	Opponent	Rank	Site/stadium	Score	Win	Loss	Save	Attendance	Overall Record	ACC Record
April 1	Florida Gulf Coast	No. 4	Dick Howser Stadium • Tallahassee, FL	**W** 8–3	**Smith (4–0)**	Anderson (1–1)	None	4,685	23–5	—
April 4	Notre Dame	No. 4	Dick Howser Stadium • Tallahassee, FL	**W** 8–7^{12}	**Blatch (1–0)**	McCarty (1–6)	None	5,678	24–5	11–2
April 6	Notre Dame	No. 4	Dick Howser Stadium • Tallahassee, FL	**W** 11–2	**Compton (3–0)**	Hearne (1–4)	None	6,041	25–5	12-2
April 6	Notre Dame	No. 4	Dick Howser Stadium • Tallahassee, FL	**W** 4–3	**Holtmann (5–0)**	Connaughton (0–2)	**Smith (1)**	6,041	26–5	13–2
April 8	No. 13 Florida	No. 2	Dick Howser Stadium • Tallahassee, FL	**L** 0–8	Young (4–0)	**Strode (0–1)**	None	6,514	26–6	—
April 11	at Georgia Tech	No. 2	Russ Chandler Stadium • Atlanta, GA	**L** 3–5	Heddinger (2–1)	**Weaver (5–3)**	Isaacs (3)	2,681	26–7	13–3
April 12	at Georgia Tech	No. 2	Russ Chandler Stadium • Atlanta, GA	**L** 4–12	Stanton (3–1)	**Compton (3–1)**	None	3,204	26–8	13–4
April 13	at Georgia Tech	No. 2	Russ Chandler Stadium • Atlanta, GA	**W** 5–4	**Silva (2–0)**	Clay (2–1)	**Winston (5)**	3,288	27–8	14–4
April 15	Jacksonville	No. 7	Dick Howser Stadium • Tallahassee, FL	**W** 6–1	**Miller (2–2)**	Maxon (0–3)	None	4,162	28–8	—
April 18	at Wake Forest	No. 7	Gene Hooks Field • Winston-Salem, NC	**W** 7–1	**Weaver (6–3)**	Fischer (4-4)	None	1,684	29-8	15-4
April 19	at Wake Forest	No. 7	Gene Hooks Field • Winston-Salem, NC	**W** 4–3^{13}	**Winston (1–0)**	Kelly (1–1)	None	953	30–8	16–4
April 20	at Wake Forest	No. 7	Gene Hooks Field • Winston-Salem, NC	**L** 2–5	McCarren (1–0)	**Miller (2–3)**	Kaden (1)	851	30–9	16–5
April 22	Stetson	No. 6	Dick Howser Stadium • Tallahassee, FL	**W** 4–0	**Strode (1–1)**	Jordan (2–6)	None	4,393	31–9	—
April 23	Stetson	No. 6	Dick Howser Stadium • Tallahassee, FL	**W** 13–3	**Silva (3–0)**	Warmoth (1–3)	None	4,040	32–9	—
April 25	No. 2 Virginia	No. 6	Dick Howser Stadium • Tallahassee, FL	**L** 3–5^{10}	Mayberry (4–1)	**Smith (4–1)**	Howard (14)	4,852	32–10	16–6
April 26	No. 2 Virginia	No. 6	Dick Howser Stadium • Tallahassee, FL	**W** 7–0	**Compton (4–1)**	Sborz (4–3)	None	5,572	33–10	17–6
April 27	No. 2 Virginia	No. 6	Dick Howser Stadium • Tallahassee, FL	**L** 3–4	Waddell (6–2)	**Holtmann (5–1)**	Howard (15)	4,791	33–11	17–7

May (8–3)

Date	Opponent	Rank	Site/stadium	Score	Win	Loss	Save	Attendance	Overall Record	ACC Record
May 3	Minnesota	No. 5	Dick Howser Stadium • Tallahassee, FL	**W** 5–4	**Byrd (1–0)**	Sawyer (3–4)	None	5,196	34–11	—
May 3	Minnesota	No. 5	Dick Howser Stadium • Tallahassee, FL	**W** 3–2	**Compton (5–1)**	Meyer (4–3)	**Miller (1)**	5,196	35–11	—
May 4	Minnesota	No. 5	Dick Howser Stadium • Tallahassee, FL	**W** 7–1	**Silva (2–0)**	Kunik (2–1)	None	4,293	36–11	—
May 6	at Stetson	No. 6	Melching Field at Conrad Park • DeLand, FL	**W** 9–4	**Miller (3–3)**	Jordan (2–7)	None	2,883	37–11	—
May 9	at North Carolina	No. 6	Boshamer Stadium • Chapel Hill, NC	**W** 7–0	**Weaver (7–3)**	Thornton (7–3)	None	3,942	38–11	18–7
May 10	at North Carolina	No. 6	Boshamer Stadium • Chapel Hill, NC	**W** 10–2	**Compton (6–1)**	Kelley (1–2)	None	3,039	39–11	19–7
May 11	at North Carolina	No. 6	Boshamer Stadium • Chapel Hill, NC	**L** 4–5	Hovis (7–1)	**Smith (4–2)**	None	2,028	39–12	19–8
May 13	UCF	No. 6	Dick Howser Stadium • Tallahassee, FL	**L** 3–8	Howell (2–1)	**Byrd (1–1)**	None	3,871	39–13	—
May 15	Duke	No. 6	Dick Howser Stadium • Tallahassee, FL	**W** 3–0	**Weaver (8–3)**	Istler (8–7)	**Winston (6)**	4,326	40–13	20–8
May 16	Duke	No. 6	Dick Howser Stadium • Tallahassee, FL	**W** 9–8	**Compton (7–1)**	Van Orden (5–5)	**Silva (1)**	4,595	41–13	21–8
May 17	Duke	No. 6	Dick Howser Stadium • Tallahassee, FL	**L** 5–7	Swart (5–2)	**Miller (3–5)**	None	4,910	41–14	21–9

Postseason (2–3)
ACC Tournament (2–1)

Date	Opponent	Rank	Site/stadium	Score	Win	Loss	Save	Attendance	Overall Record	Tournament Record
May 21	vs. (7) North Carolina	(2) No. 6	NewBridge Bank Park • Greensboro, NC	**W** 7–1	**Strode (2–1)**	Cherry (2–3)	None	4,738	42–14	1–0
May 23	vs. (6) Maryland	(2) No. 6	NewBridge Bank Park • Greensboro, NC	**L** 3–5	Shawaryn (10–3)	**Compton (7–2)**	Mooney (11)	3,531	42–15	1–1
May 24	vs. (3) No. 4 Virginia	(2) No. 6	NewBridge Bank Park • Greensboro, NC	**W** 6–4	**Smith (5–2)**	Sborz (4–4)	**Winston (7)**	5,298	43–15	2–1

NCAA tournament (0–2)
Tallahassee Regional (0–2)

Date	Opponent	Rank	Site/stadium	Score	Win	Loss	Save	Attendance	Overall Record	Tournament Record
May 30	(4) Georgia Southern	(1) No. 8	Dick Howser Stadium • Tallahassee, FL	**L** 0–7	Howard (7–6)	**Compton (7–3)**	None	3,396	43–16	0–1
May 31	(2) Alabama	(1) No. 8	Dick Howser Stadium • Tallahassee, FL	**L** 5–6	Kamplain (7–3)	**Weaver (8–4)**	Burrows (11)	3,586	43–17	0–2

Legend: = Win = Loss = Postponement
Bold = Florida State team member
Rankings from Collegiate Baseball poll. Parenthesis indicate tournament seedings.

== Rankings ==
Ranking movements Legend: ██ Increase in ranking ██ Decrease in ranking ( ) = First-place votes
	Week																		
Poll	Pre	1	2	3	4	5	6	7	8	9	10	11	12	13	14	15	16	17	Final
Coaches'	5	5*	5	2 (7)	2 (7)	1 (14)	1 (24)	2 (11)	1 (19)	5	5	4	4	4	5	3	3	3	21
Baseball America	6	4	2	2	2	2	1	1	1	4	4	6	5	4	4	4	4	4	19
Collegiate Baseball^	5	5	2	2	2	2	3	4	2	7	6	5	6	6	6	8	23	23	23
NCBWA†	5	3	2	2	2	1	2	3	2	5	5	6	4	4	6	5	18	18	21

^ Collegiate Baseball ranked 40 teams in their preseason poll, but only ranked 30 teams weekly during the season.
† NCBWA ranks 30 teams in their preseason poll, but only ranks 25 teams weekly during the season.
* A new poll was not released for this week, so for comparison purposes, the previous week's ranking is inserted in this week's slot.

== Awards ==
=== Watchlists ===
- Golden Spikes Award

D. J. Stewart
Luke Weaver

==== Semifinalists ====
- Dick Howser Trophy

D. J. Stewart

- Golden Spikes Award

D. J. Stewart

- ACC Player of the Year

D. J. Stewart

== All-Americans ==
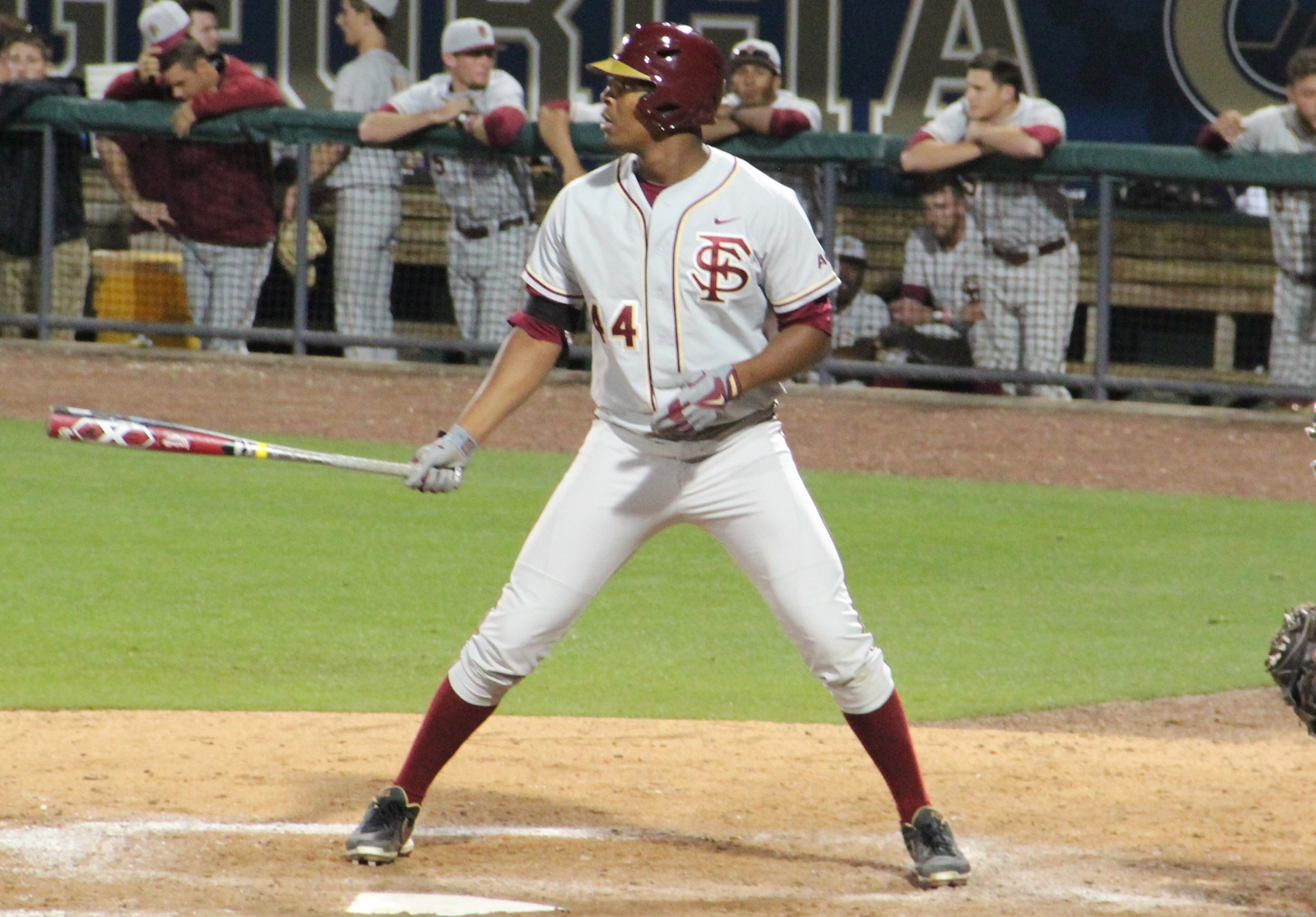
Jameis Winston was a closer during the 2014 season.

- D. J. Stewart
- Luke Weaver

All-ACC Selections

- John Nogowski (first team)
- D. J. Stewart (first team)
- Luke Weaver (first team)
- Jose Brizuela (first team)
- Josh Delph (Third Team)
- Gage Smith (Third Team)

== MLB draft ==
Eight players were selected in the 2014 MLB draft:

Round	Overall Pick	Name	Position	Team
1st	27	Luke Weaver	Pitcher	St. Louis Cardinals
6th	172	Brandon Leibrandt	Pitcher	Philadelphia Phillies
9th	261	Peter Miller	Pitcher	Seattle Mariners
9th	270	Justin Gonzalez	Infielder	Arizona Diamondbacks
16th	492	Jose Brizuela	Infielder	Oakland Athletics
25th	760	Gage Smith	Pitcher	Detroit Tigers
34th	1,032	John Nogowski	Infielder	Oakland Athletics
37th	1,121	Bryant Holtmann	Pitcher	Pittsburgh Pirates
