= UNCG Baseball Stadium =

College stadium in North Carolina, U.S.

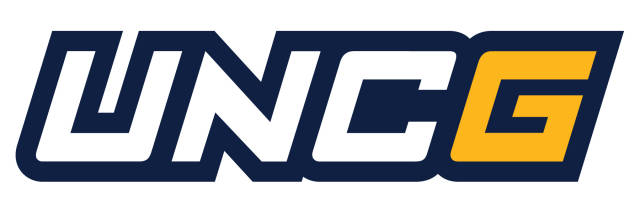

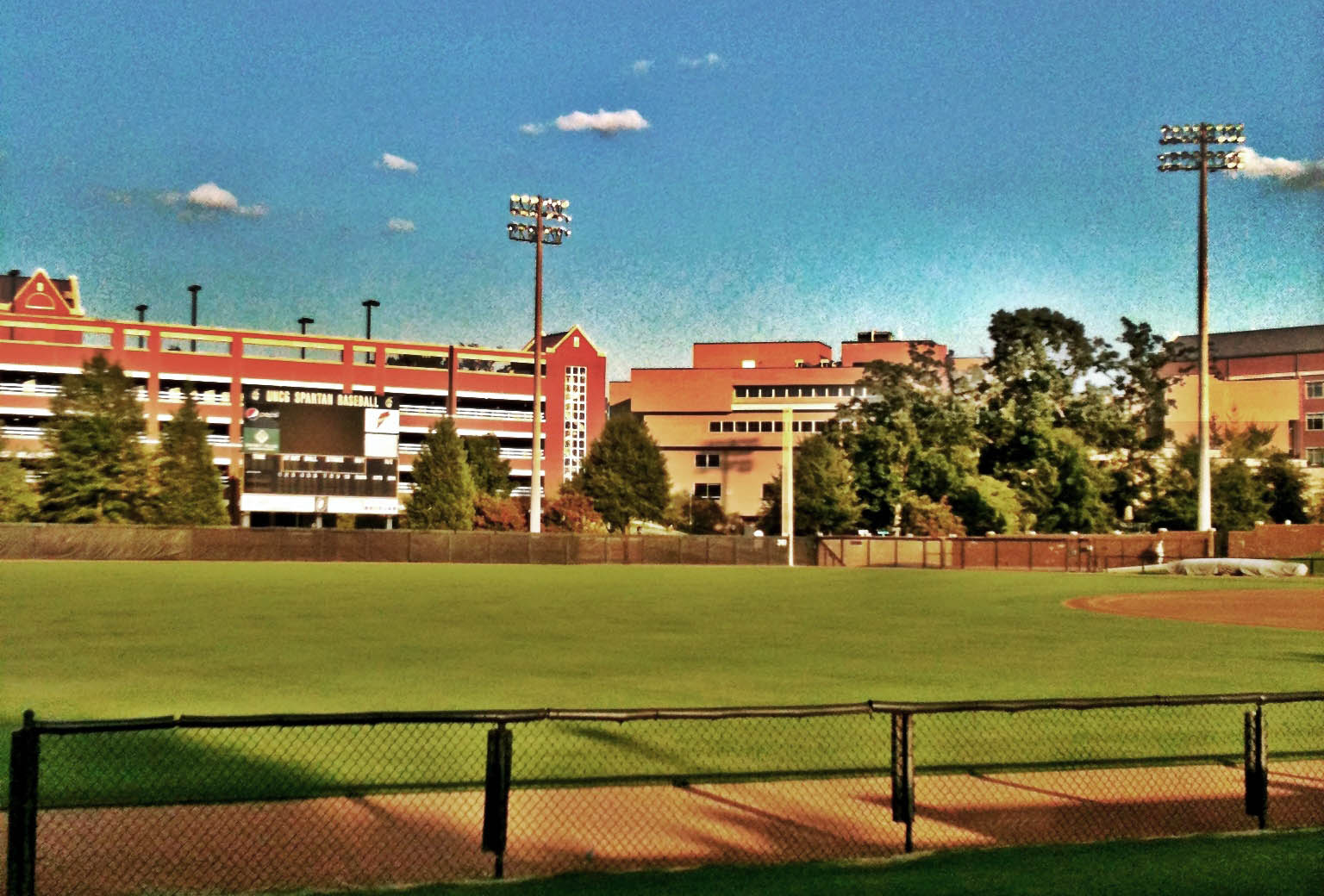
- View of the stadium in 2012
- Interactive map of UNCG Baseball Stadium
- Full name: University of North Carolina at Greensboro Baseball Stadium
- Address: Greensboro, NC; United States
- Location: 1509 Walker Ave.
- Owner: UNC Greensboro
- Operator: UNC Greensboro Athletics
- Capacity: 3,500 (889 permanent seats)
- Type: Baseball stadium
- Surface: Natural grass
- Scoreboard: Electronic
- Acreage: 13 acres (53,000 m^{2})

Construction
- Built: 1999
- Opened: February 12, 1999; 27 years ago
- Renovated: 2008
- Cost: $5.4 million

Tenant
- UNC Greensboro Spartans baseball (NCAA DI SoCon) (1999–present)

The UNCG Baseball Stadium is a baseball venue located on the campus of UNCG in Greensboro, North Carolina. The stadium is home to the UNC Greensboro Spartans baseball team, which is a member of the Southern Conference (SoCon).

The stadium has a capacity of 3,500 spectators and opened in 1999.

== History ==
The first game at the UNCG Baseball Stadium was played on February 12, 1999, in front of 1,835 spectators.

== Description ==
The UNCG Baseball Stadium encompasses 10,000 square feet (930 m^{2}) of space on approximately 13 acres (53,000 m^{2}) of land. It cost $5.4 million to build.

The stadium includes a press box, PA system, concessions, offices, lights, a drainage system, dugouts, and a scoreboard. The venue has 889 permanent seats and additional berm seating, which sums to a seating capacity of approximately 3,500.

In 2006, a new scoreboard with a videoboard to show live statistics during games was installed.

In 2012, John Manuel of Baseball America called the stadium "one of the best mid-major ballparks in the Southeast." In the same year, writer Eric Sorenson ranked the stadium the second best small venue in Division I baseball.
