= Luke Weaver =

American baseball player (born 1993)

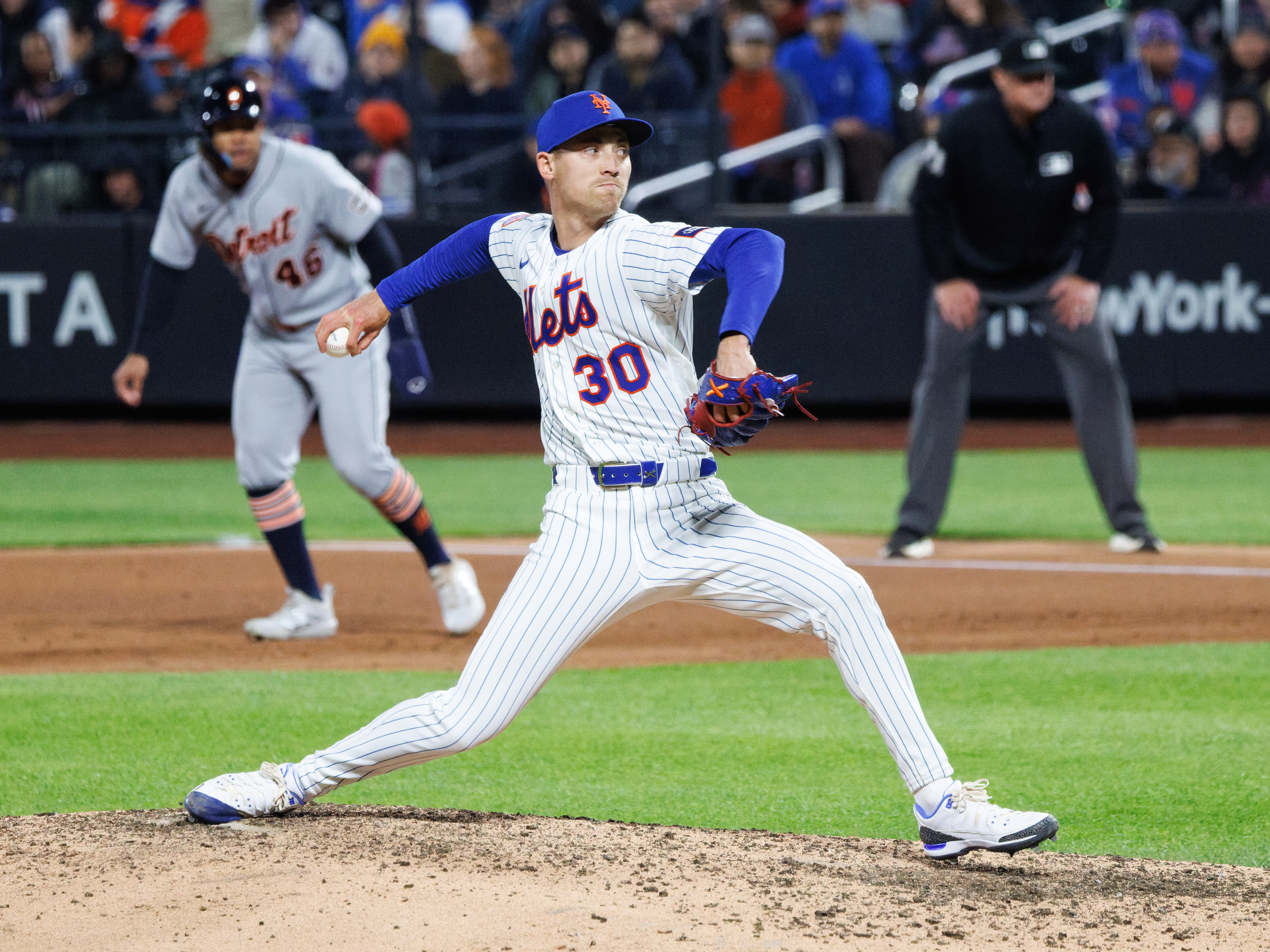
- Weaver with the Mets in 2026

Pittsburgh Pirates – No. 18
- Pitcher
- Born: August 21, 1993 (age 33); DeLand, Florida, U.S.
- Bats: Right Throws: Right

MLB debut
- August 13, 2016, for the St. Louis Cardinals

MLB statistics (through September 24, 2026)
- Win–loss record: 42–50
- Earned run average: 4.59
- Strikeouts: 810
- Stats at Baseball Reference

Teams
- St. Louis Cardinals (2016–2018); Arizona Diamondbacks (2019–2022); Kansas City Royals (2022); Cincinnati Reds (2023); Seattle Mariners (2023); New York Yankees (2023–2025); New York Mets (2026); Pittsburgh Pirates (2026–present)

Luke Allen Weaver (born August 21, 1993) is an American professional baseball pitcher for the Pittsburgh Pirates of Major League Baseball (MLB). He has previously played in MLB for the St. Louis Cardinals, Arizona Diamondbacks, Kansas City Royals, Cincinnati Reds, Seattle Mariners, New York Yankees, and New York Mets.

Weaver attended Florida State University, where he played college baseball for the Florida State Seminoles. The Cardinals selected him in the first round of the 2014 MLB draft, and he made his MLB debut in 2016. He was traded to the Diamondbacks after the 2018 season and moved to the bullpen in 2022. He struggled as a starting pitcher, resulting in being released midseason by the Royals, Reds, and Mariners. Weaver pitched with the Yankees, becoming the team's closer in 2024, including in the World Series. He signed with the Mets ahead of the 2026 season, and was traded to the Pirates at the 2026 trade deadline.

== Early life and career ==
Weaver grew up a fan of the Tampa Bay Rays of Major League Baseball (MLB). He graduated from DeLand High School in DeLand, Florida, in 2011. He was drafted by the Toronto Blue Jays in the 19th round of the 2011 MLB draft but did not sign, choosing to go to college.

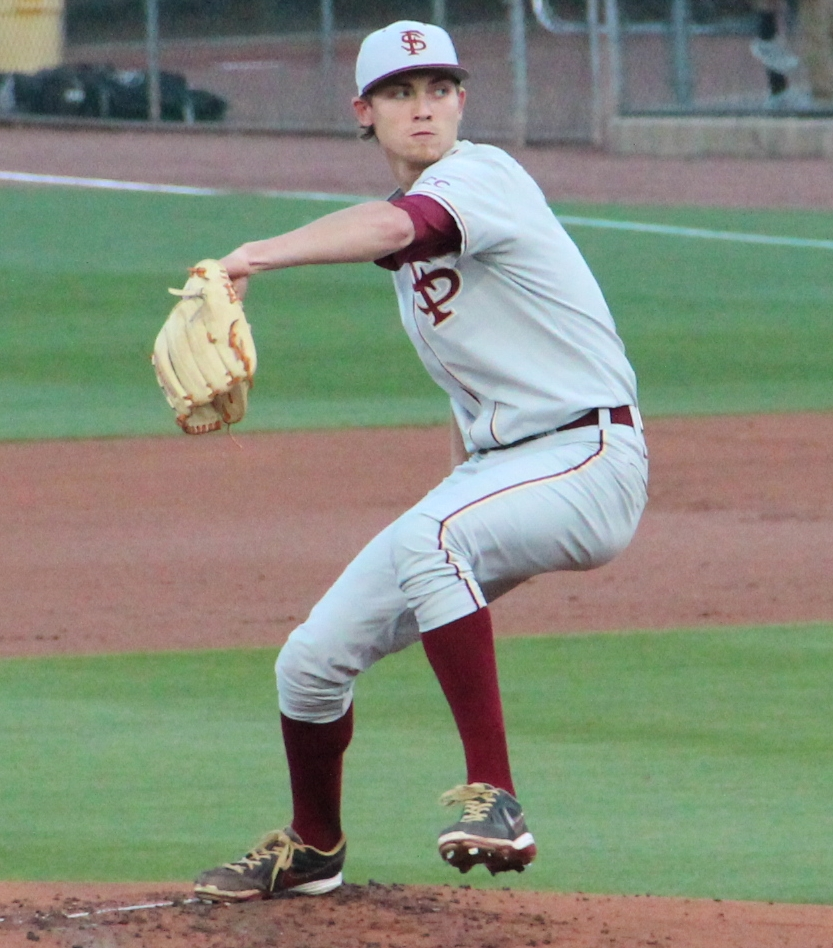
Weaver pitching for the Florida State Seminoles in 2014

Weaver attended Florida State University and played college baseball for the Florida State Seminoles from 2012 to 2014. After the 2012 season, he played collegiate summer baseball with the Brewster Whitecaps of the Cape Cod Baseball League. As a sophomore in 2013, he had a 7–2 win–loss record with a 2.29 earned run average (ERA) in 17 games (15 starts). In 2014, as a junior, he was 8–4 with a 2.62 ERA in 16 starts.

== Professional career ==
=== St. Louis Cardinals ===
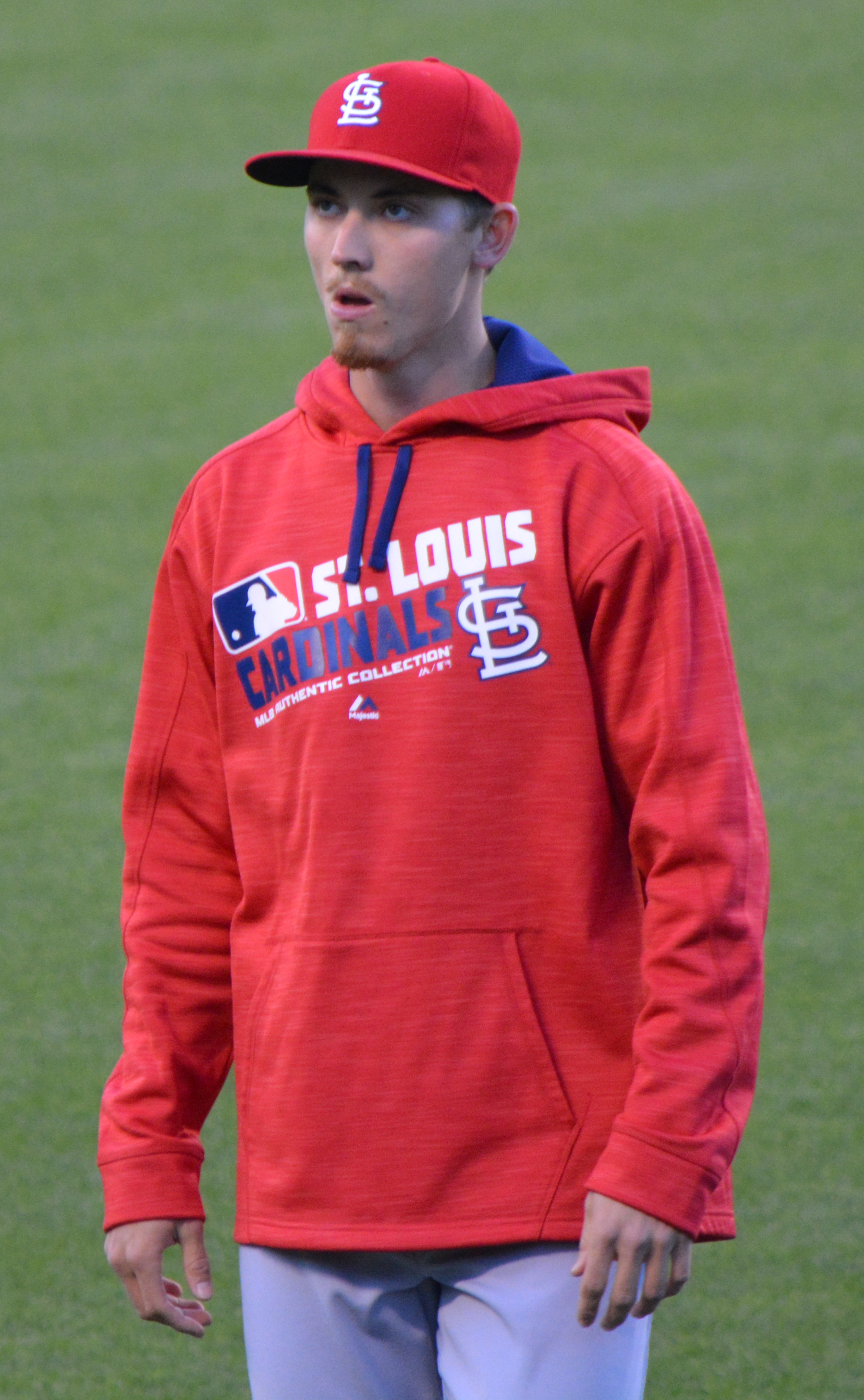
Weaver with the Cardinals in 2016

The St. Louis Cardinals selected Weaver in the first round with the 27th overall pick of the 2014 Major League Baseball draft. He signed with the Cardinals on June 16 and made his professional debut for the GCL Cardinals. He was promoted to the Palm Beach Cardinals on August 1. In six starts between the two teams, he was 0–1 with a 7.71 ERA and 2.04 WHIP.

Weaver spent 2015 with Palm Beach. He earned the Cardinals July Pitcher of the Month Award after compiling a 3–1 record and an 0.94 ERA in 28 1/3 innings pitched (IP) in five starts. He also struck out 27 and walked only two during the month. Baseball America selected Weaver for the high Class-A minor leagues All-Star team for the 2015 season, In 19 total starts for Palm Beach in 2015, he was 8–5 with a 1.62 ERA.

Baseball America ranked Weaver as the Cardinals' fourth-best prospect prior to the 2016 season. He did not make his debut for the Springfield Cardinals until June 4 because of a fractured left wrist sustained while running down fly balls during batting practice in spring training. In their mid-season ranking, Baseball America rated Weaver in the top-100 for the first time, at 75th. After posting a 1.40 ERA with 88 strikeouts in 77 innings pitched with Springfield, the Cardinals promoted Weaver to the Memphis Redbirds on August 3.

On August 13, 2016, the Cardinals called Weaver up from Memphis to make his major league debut and start in place of the injured Michael Wacha against the Chicago Cubs. Weaver struck out his first major league batter, Dexter Fowler. Weaver pitched four innings, giving up two runs, four hits, three walks, and three strikeouts for no decision in an eventual 8–4 win. Weaver spent the rest of the season with St. Louis. After the season, MLB Pipeline named him the Cardinals 2016 Minor League Pitcher of the Year due to his success with the Springfield Cardinals, where he posted a 6–3 record and 1.40 ERA with 88 strikeouts in 77 innings pitched. The Cardinals also named Weaver their 2016 Minor League Pitcher of the Year. In nine games (eight starts) for St. Louis, he pitched to a 1–4 record and 5.70 ERA.

Weaver began his 2017 season back in Memphis, where he earned the title of Pacific Coast League Player of the Month after posting a 2.19 ERA in 37 innings in May. He was recalled and optioned multiple times during the season before he was recalled for the remainder of the season on August 17. In 15 starts for Memphis, Weaver compiled a 10–2 record and 2.55 ERA and in 13 games (ten starts) for the Cardinals he pitched to a 7–2 record and 3.88 ERA.

Weaver began 2018 with St. Louis as a member of their starting rotation, but was moved to the bullpen in mid-August after compiling a 6–11 record with a 4.67 ERA in 24 starts. He finished the 2018 season with a 7–11 record, a 4.95 ERA, and a 1.50 WHIP in 30 games (25 starts).

=== Arizona Diamondbacks ===
On December 5, 2018, the Cardinals traded Weaver, Carson Kelly, Andy Young, and a draft pick to the Arizona Diamondbacks in exchange for Paul Goldschmidt.

On March 31, 2019, he crushed his only major-league home run, a two-run shot off Pedro Báez. Weaver pitched in 12 games in 2019, producing a 2.94 ERA with 69 strikeouts in 64 1/3 innings.

In 2020, Weaver went 1–9 with a 6.58 ERA and 55 strikeouts over 52 innings. He led the majors in losses during the shortened season. On May 27, 2021, Weaver was placed on the 60-day injured list with a right shoulder strain. On September 1, Weaver was activated from the injured list. Over 13 starts for the 2021 season, Weaver went 3–6 with a 4.25 ERA.

Weaver began the 2022 season as a relief pitcher but went on the injured list with elbow inflammation on April 10. On May 28, the Diamondbacks shifted Weaver to the 60-day injured list retroactively. He was activated on June 12. In 12 games with Arizona, he was 1–1 with a 7.71 ERA.

=== Kansas City Royals ===
On August 1, 2022, the Diamondbacks traded Weaver to the Kansas City Royals for infielder Emmanuel Rivera. With the Royals in 2022, Weaver was 0–0 with a 5.59 ERA in 14 games.

=== Cincinnati Reds ===
On October 26, 2022 the Seattle Mariners claimed Weaver from the Royals off of waivers. On November 18, he was non-tendered and became a free agent.

On January 13, 2023, Weaver signed a one-year, $2 million contract with the Cincinnati Reds. In 21 starts for Cincinnati, he struggled to a 6.87 ERA with 24 home runs and 85 strikeouts in 97 innings pitched. On August 16, Weaver was designated for assignment by the Reds. He was released by Cincinnati on August 18.

=== Seattle Mariners ===
On August 22, 2023, Weaver signed a one-year major league contract with the Seattle Mariners. In 5 appearances for Seattle, he logged a 6.08 ERA with eight strikeouts in 13 1/3 innings. On September 10, Weaver was designated for assignment by the Mariners.

=== New York Yankees ===
On September 12, 2023, the New York Yankees claimed Weaver off of waivers. He made three starts, pitching to a 3.38 ERA and 16 strikeouts in 13 2/3 innings. He became a free agent following the season and the Yankees signed him to a one-year contract with a $2.5 million club option for 2025 on January 19, 2024.

Beginning in September 2024, Weaver served as the Yankees' closer following struggles from Clay Holmes. On September 6, he earned his first career save, pitching a scoreless ninth inning against the Chicago Cubs at Wrigley Field. Weaver converted all four of his save chances in September, producing 25 strikeouts over 12 innings and holding opposing hitters to a .438 on-base plus slugging during the month. In 84 innings pitched, Weaver had a 2.89 ERA and 103 strikeouts compared to just 26 walks.

Weaver remained the Yankees' closer to begin their postseason run. In the American League (AL) Division Series, Weaver saved all three wins against the Royals, striking out five and allowing no runs in four innings. Weaver blew his first career save in Game 3 of the AL Championship Series against the Cleveland Guardians, but he rebounded in Game 5, pitching two scoreless innings and earning the win as the Yankees advanced to the World Series. In November, the Yankees exercised the club option on Weaver's contract. Since 2024, Weaver's entrance song at home games has been "Dream Weaver" by Gary Wright.

During the offseason, the Yankees traded for Devin Williams, who became the team's closer. On April 27, manager Aaron Boone announced that Williams' demotion, and Weaver returned to the role. Weaver strained his hamstring while warming up on June 1 and was placed two days later on the injured list. In 64 appearances for New York, Weaver logged a 3.62 ERA with 72 strikeouts and eight saves over 64 2/3 innings pitched.

=== New York Mets ===
On December 22, 2025, Weaver signed a two-year, $22 million contract with the New York Mets. In 44 innings of work, Weaver achieved 45 strikeouts and a 1.84 ERA for the Mets.

=== Pittsburgh Pirates ===
On August 3, 2026, the Mets traded Weaver to the Pittsburgh Pirates in exchange for Sammy Stafura.

== Personal life ==
Weaver is married. They welcomed their first child in October 2019. Weaver is a Christian.
