= Nick Howard (baseball) =

American baseball player (born 1993)

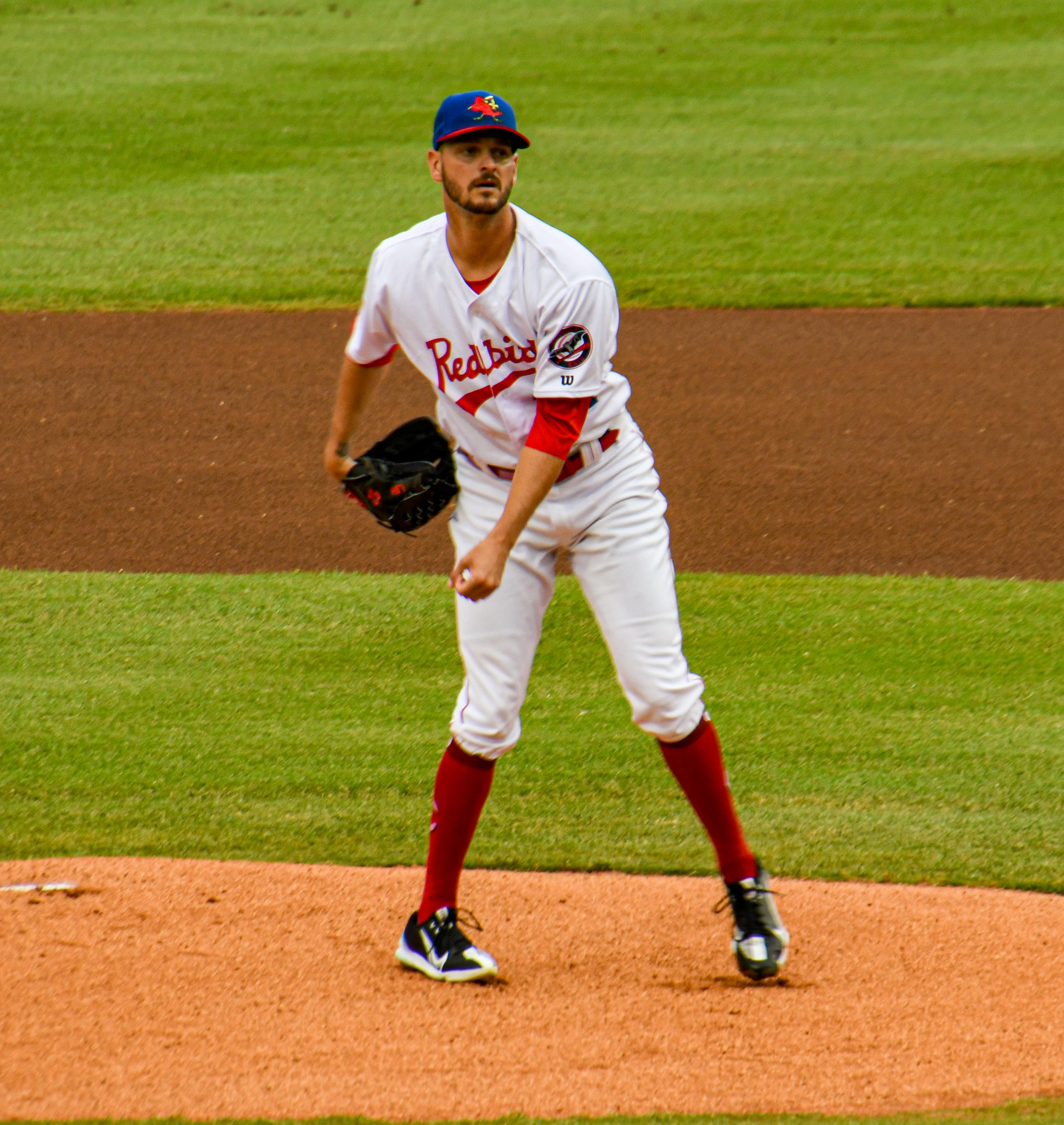
- Pitcher
- Born: April 6, 1993 (age 32); Stamford, Connecticut, U.S.
- Bats: Right Throws: Right
- Stats at Baseball Reference

Nick Paul Howard (born April 16, 1993) is an American former professional baseball pitcher. He played college baseball at Virginia. He was drafted by the Cincinnati Reds in the first round of the 2014 Major League Baseball draft.

== Amateur career ==
Howard attended St. John's College High School in Washington, DC. Howard was both a pitcher and infielder at the University of Virginia. As a freshman in 2012, he appeared in 19 games as a relief pitcher and also had 52 at-bats in 26 games. As a pitcher he was 3–0 and had a 2.81 earned run average (ERA) and 37 strikeouts in 41 2/3 innings. As a batter he hit .346/.435/.404.

As a sophomore in 2013, he appeared in 13 games as a pitcher with 12 starts and 50 games as a batter. He was 6–4 with a 3.38 ERA and 52 strikeouts in 61 1/3 innings. He hit .323/.344/.449 with three home runs. For his play, he was named first team All-ACC. In 2013, he played collegiate summer baseball with the Harwich Mariners of the Cape Cod Baseball League. As a junior in 2014, he took over as the Cavaliers' closer. He again was named All-ACC.

== Professional career ==
=== Cincinnati Reds ===
The Cincinnati Reds selected Howard in the first round, 19th overall, of the 2014 Major League Baseball draft. Howard signed and was assigned to the Dayton Dragons, where he spent his first professional season, posting a 2–1 record, 3.74 ERA, and a 1.16 WHIP in 33.2 innings. He returned to Dayton in 2015, but struggled; he pitched to a 6.63 ERA, giving up 28 runs in 38 innings. In 2016, he pitched for the Daytona Tortugas, posting a 6.75 ERA in only 20 innings before an injury caused him to miss the rest of the season. Howard was also forced to miss 2017 due to the injury. He returned in 2018 and pitched for both Daytona and the Pensacola Blue Wahoos, pitching to a combined 3–4 record with a 5.13 ERA in 38 relief appearances between both teams. On June 23, 2019, the Reds released Howard.

=== Kansas City Royals ===
On August 13, 2019, Howard signed a minor league contract with the Kansas City Royals. He did not appear for the organization and elected free agency following the season on November 4.

On January 22, 2020, Howard re-signed with the Royals on a minor league contract. Howard did not play in a game in 2020 due to the cancellation of the minor league season because of the COVID-19 pandemic. He elected free agency on November 2.

=== Cincinnati Reds (second stint) ===
On March 12, 2021, Howard signed a minor league contract with the Reds organization. Howard spent the 2021 season with the Double-A Chattanooga Lookouts and Triple-A Louisville Bats. He made 42 appearances, going 1-1 with a 4.50 ERA and 51 strikeouts. Howard was released by the Reds organization on May 26, 2022, after struggling to a 10.80 ERA in 14 appearances for Triple-A Louisville.

=== York Revolution ===
On June 4, 2022, Howard signed with the York Revolution of the Atlantic League of Professional Baseball. Howard made 22 appearances for York, pitching to a 3.91 ERA while striking out 27 in 23.0 innings of work.

=== Atlanta Braves ===
On November 18, 2022, Howard signed a minor league contract to return to the Cincinnati Reds organization. However, on February 2, 2023, Howard signed with the Lake Country DockHounds of the American Association of Professional Baseball. Before the start of the American Association season, on February 14, Howard signed a minor league contract with the Atlanta Braves organization and was assigned to the Triple-A Gwinnett Stripers. In 16 appearances split between the High–A Rome Braves and Double–A Mississippi Braves, Howard accumulated a 3.92 ERA with 16 strikeouts across 20 2/3 innings pitched. He was released by the Braves on July 10.
