= Davenport Field at Disharoon Park =

Baseball stadium in Charlottesville, Virginia

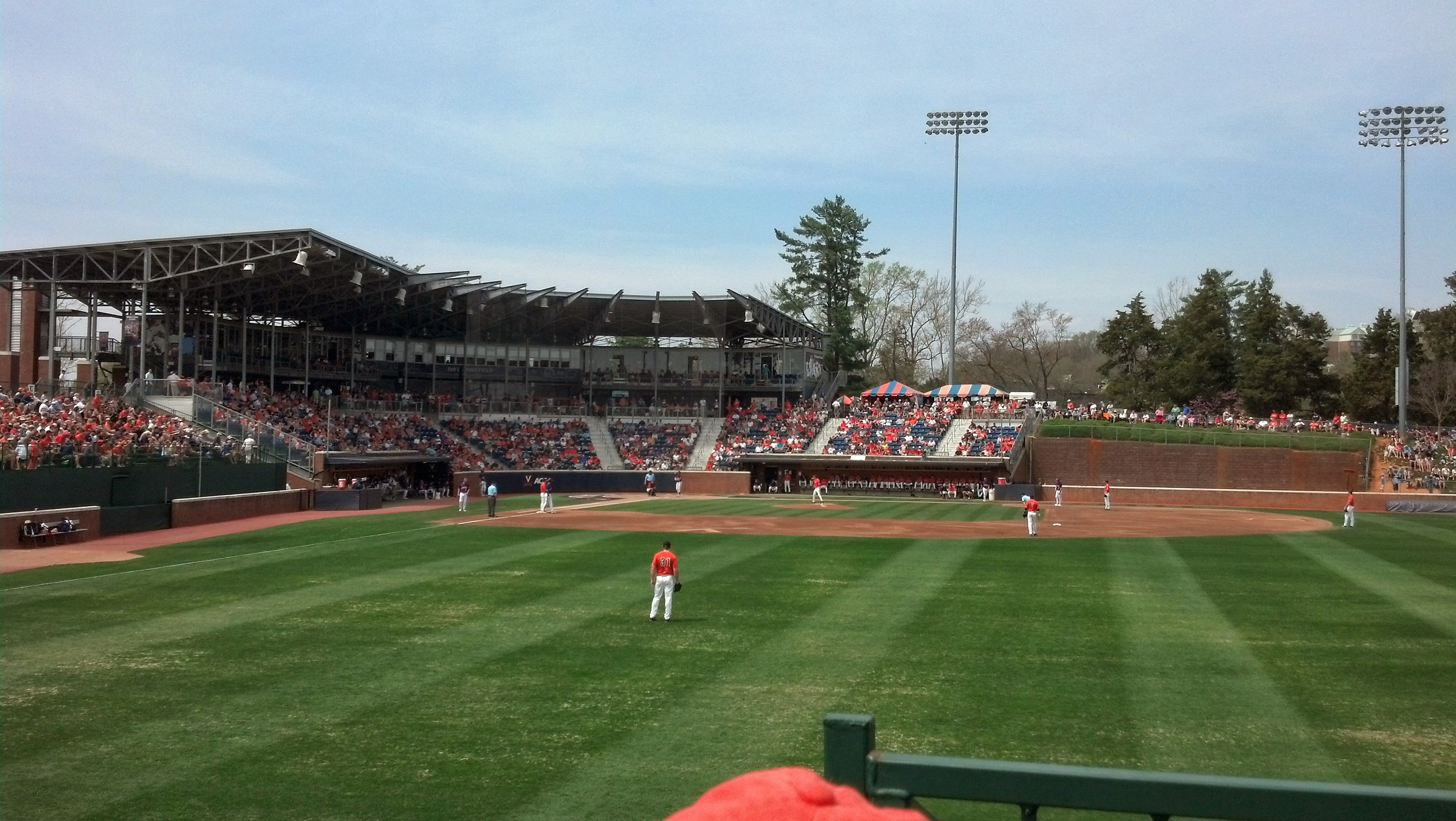
- Interactive map of Davenport Field at Disharoon Park
- Former names: UVa Baseball Field (prior to 2002); Davenport Field at UVA Baseball Stadium (prior to 2018)
- Location: 434 Lannigan Lane; Charlottesville, Virginia 22904
- Coordinates: 38°2′45″N 78°30′50″W
- Owner: University of Virginia
- Operator: University of Virginia
- Capacity: 5,919
- Surface: Bermuda grass
- Field size: Left Field - 332 ft Left Center - 370 ft Center Field - 404 ft Right Center - 372 ft Right Field - 332 ft

Construction
- Opened: February 16, 2002; 24 years ago
- Architect: VMDO Architects

Tenant
- Virginia Cavaliers (Baseball)

Davenport Field at Disharoon Park is a baseball stadium in Charlottesville, Virginia. It is the home field of the University of Virginia Cavaliers college baseball team. The stadium has a capacity of 5,919 and opened in 2002. The field is named after former Virginia Student Aid Foundation executive director Ted Davenport, and the stadium is named after Leslie and Ann Disharoon.

== Opening Day ==
On February 16, 2002, the University of Virginia baseball program defeated the Bucknell Bison 10–3 in the first ever contest played at the brand new UVA Baseball Stadium. Virginia opened the door on its new multimillion-dollar facility for the 2002 season.

A second opening day of sorts took place in February 2018, when the newly renovated stadium was rechristened "Davenport Field at Disharoon Park" ahead of the team's home opener against VMI.

== Renovations ==
Disharoon Park has been through a series of improvements over its tenure as the home to the Virginia Cavaliers, but none like the upgrades and renovations that have taken place in recent years.

Improvements to the stadium include: a canopied grandstand with 1,500 seats; an additional 500 seats and a grass hillside to provide more seating; six sky boxes for lease by fans and corporate sponsors; stadium lights; new dugouts for the home and visiting teams; an on-site locker room and club house; a new press box, and a new concession area.

Representing a major athletic facility improvement, the University of Virginia installed a new grass playing surface at the then UVA Baseball Field in 1998. The Bermuda grass playing surface - known as Davenport Field - was dedicated on Saturday, April 13, 2002, during Virginia's second contest of a three-game series against the Wake Forest Demon Deacons. Financial backers of the 2002 expansion included novelist John Grisham.

Following the 2005 season, the left field wall was shortened and moved inward to decrease the distance down the line by 17 feet. The right field was not adjusted as the stadium dimensions became asymmetrical for 2006.

Following the 2006 season, a new scoreboard featuring a video system similar to the ones at the John Paul Jones Arena and Klockner Stadium was installed at Davenport Field. The right field wall was adjusted in association with the project, resulting in a return to symmetrical field dimensions for 2007.

Prior to the 2010 season, a new set of facilities under the stadium were constructed, including an on-site visitors' clubhouse, umpire room, coaches' office. A hall of fame dedicated to baseball will also be constructed in the same space.

During the 2010 season, the seating capacity of Davenport Field was progressively increased with the addition of 3 sets of temporary bleachers. This expanded the facility's capacity from 3,600 to 4,825, with the final addition occurring prior to the school's final ACC series at home versus North Carolina.

Prior to the May 13, 2011, series versus Miami, 249 General Admission seats were added behind the right field wall increasing the stadium's capacity to 5,074.

Prior to the 2013 season, 6 grandstand sections with aluminum bleacher seating were converted to chairback seating, resulting in a reduction of stadium capacity to 4,980.

A new club seating area called the Clubhouse was added to Davenport Field prior to the 2014 season. Located in left-center field, the Clubhouse includes an indoor, climate-controlled area with a cash bar, seating and TVs as well as 65 outdoor chairback seats.

Davenport Field was expanded during the 2017 offseason to include a new grand entry in right field, an extended concourse with permanent chair back seats along the third base line, a field-level club area with seating for up to 140 fans, and new concessions, merchandise, and restroom facilities. The newly renovated stadium includes new areas for player training and development, a new pitching development center, and new offices for the coaches. The new capacity is approximately 5,900. Prior to the February 21, 2018, home opener against VMI, the university announced that following a donation, the official stadium name would change to Davenport Field and Disharoon Park.

== Expanded scheduling ==
The new ballpark has enabled Virginia to schedule games against nationally prominent teams that previously would have been played on the road. "This will increase the opportunity for television game coverage," said Craig Littlepage, UVA athletic director. "Adding stadium lighting will allow our team to play or practice at night and thus miss fewer classes. In addition, the facility will become a community asset, offering a potential venue for high school tournaments and adult-league games.

== Namesake ==
The field was named in honor of Thomas "Ted" Edward Davenport, who was the University of Virginia Executive Director and Secretary/Treasurer of the Virginia Student Aid Foundation (VSAF) from 1958 until 1988. A 1953 graduate of the Curry School of Education, Davenport was instrumental in increasing the donations and donors to the annual fund and leading capital funding efforts for the athletics program during his tenure. He served the university in several capacities including head baseball coach and head golf coach.

In 2018, a commitment was made by an anonymous donor to name the Virginia baseball stadium Disharoon Park in honor of Leslie and Ann Disharoon. Ann Disharoon, who died in 2013, was a Virginia baseball fan and Leslie Disharoon remains a supporter of the baseball program. He has served as a member of the Virginia Athletics Foundation Board of Trustees.

== Milestones and facts ==
Achievement	Record
Largest Attendance	5,919—Multiple, most recently April 13, 2025, vs. Pittsburgh
Overall Record in Facility	629–185 (.773)*
ACC Record in Facility	214–119 (.642)*
Record vs. State Opponents	167–28 (.856)*
1st Game	February 16, 2002, vs. Bucknell
1st Night Game	March 29, 2002, vs. North Carolina
1st Win	10–3 (February 16, 2002, vs. Bucknell)
1st Loss	13–7 (February 26, 2002, vs. VCU)
1st ACC Win	11–10 (March 15, 2002, vs. #1 Florida State)
1st Win over Ranked Team	11–10 (March 15, 2002, vs. #1 Florida State)
1st Regional Hosted	June 4, 2004, vs. Princeton
1st Super Regional Hosted	June 12, 2010, vs. Oklahoma
*As of June 9, 2025

== Perfect Game ==
On March 30, 2011, Virginia pitcher Will Roberts threw a perfect game at Disharoon Park in UVA's 2–0 win over George Washington. It remains the only perfect game in Virginia baseball history and 1 of only 36 perfect games in NCAA history.

== Postseason Play ==
Davenport Field has hosted 11 NCAA Regionals and 7 NCAA Super Regionals since opening in 2002. Two teams, the 2007 Oregon State Beavers and the 2015 Virginia Cavaliers, went on to win the College World Series after playing postseason baseball at Disharoon Park.

Event	Winning Team
2004 Charlottesville Regional	Vanderbilt
2006 Charlottesville Regional	South Carolina
2007 Charlottesville Regional	Oregon State
2010 Charlottesville Regional	#5 Virginia
2010 Charlottesville Super Regional	#12 Oklahoma
2011 Charlottesville Regional	#1 Virginia
2011 Charlottesville Super Regional	#1 Virginia
2012 Charlottesville Regional	Oklahoma
2013 Charlottesville Regional	#6 Virginia
2013 Charlottesville Super Regional	#11 Mississippi State
2014 Charlottesville Regional	#3 Virginia
2014 Charlottesville Super Regional	#3 Virginia
2015 Charlottesville Super Regional	Virginia
2016 Charlottesville Regional	East Carolina
2023 Charlottesville Regional	#7 Virginia
2023 Charlottesville Super Regional	#7 Virginia
2024 Charlottesville Regional	#12 Virginia
2024 Charlottesville Super Regional	#12 Virginia

== Attendance ==
In 2022, the Cavaliers ranked 22nd among Division I baseball programs in attendance, averaging 3,309 per home game. That ranks Virginia third in the ACC in attendance, behind only Florida State (12th nationally) and Clemson (13th nationally).

In 2023, the Cavaliers saw their ranking rise to 13th nationally, averaging 3,679 per home game. That ranks Virginia second in the ACC in attendance, behind only Clemson (12th nationally).

In 2024, the Cavaliers finished the season ranked 19th in attendance among Division I baseball programs, averaging 3,940 fans per home game. That places the Cavaliers third in the ACC in attendance, behind only Florida State (12th nationally) and Clemson (15th nationally).

== See also ==
- List of NCAA Division I baseball venues
- Virginia Cavaliers
