= UConn Huskies baseball, 2010–2019 =

American college baseball seasons

UConn Huskies baseball represents the University of Connecticut in college baseball at the NCAA Division I level.

== 2010 ==
2010 Connecticut Huskies baseball

Norwich Regional, 1–2
- Conference: Big East Conference
- Record: 48–16 (20–6 Big East)
- Head coach: Jim Penders (7th season)
- Assistant coaches: Justin Blood (5th season); Steven Malinowski (2nd season); Chris Podeszwa (7th season)
- Home stadium: J.O. Christian Field

2010 Big East Conference baseball standings
	Conf.						Overall
Team	W		L		T	PCT	W		L		T	PCT
Louisville ‍†‍‍	21	–	6	–	0	.778	50	–	14	–	0	.781
Connecticut ‍‍‍	20	–	6	–	0	.769	48	–	16	–	0	.750
Pittsburgh ‍‍‍	18	–	8	–	0	.692	38	–	18	–	0	.679
St. John's ‍‍‡‍	16	–	11	–	0	.593	43	–	20	–	0	.683
South Florida ‍‍‍	16	–	11	–	0	.593	26	–	32	–	0	.448
Rutgers ‍‍‍	15	–	12	–	0	.556	30	–	26	–	0	.536
Cincinnati ‍‍‍	13	–	14	–	0	.481	29	–	29	–	0	.500
West Virginia ‍‍‍	10	–	17	–	0	.370	27	–	30	–	0	.474
Notre Dame ‍‍‍	10	–	17	–	0	.370	22	–	32	–	0	.407
Villanova ‍‍‍	9	–	18	–	0	.333	29	–	23	–	0	.558
Seton Hall ‍‍‍	8	–	19	–	0	.296	19	–	30	–	1	.390
Georgetown ‍‍‍	5	–	22	–	0	.185	24	–	31	–	0	.436
† – Conference champion ‡ – Tournament champion As of June 8, 2010; Rankings from Collegiate Baseball

=== Personnel ===
==== Roster ====
2010 Connecticut Huskies roster
Pitchers: 11 – Will Jolin – (redshirt) Freshman; 12 – Robert Van Woert – (redshirt) Junior; 13 – Ryan Thompson – (redshirt) Freshman; 18 – Dave Fischer – Sophomore; 19 – Stephen Catalina – Freshman; 21 – Elliot Glynn – Junior; 26 – Matt Barnes – Sophomore; 30 – Tom Coughlin – Sophomore; 31 – Scott Oberg – Sophomore; 32 – Ted Hurvul – (redshirt) Sophomore; 33 – Michael Zaccardo – (redshirt) Freshman; 36 – Doug Jennings – Senior; 40 – David Voisine – Sophomore; 41 – Greg Nappo – (redshirt) Junior; 42 – Kevin Vance – Sophomore; 43 – Dan Feehan – Sophomore; 44 – Pat Butler – Sophomore; 45 – Trent DeLazzer – Senior	Catchers: 2 – Tim Panetta – Sophomore; 5 – Joe Pavone – Junior; 8 – Doug Elliot – (redshirt) Junior; 27 – John Sulzicki – Sophomore; Infielders: 1 – Tim Martin – Sophomore; 6 – L. J. Mazzilli – Sophomore; 7 – Nick Ahmed – Sophomore; 9 – Pierre LePage – Junior; 22 – Mike Olt – Junior; 29 – Mike Nemeth – Junior; 39 – Kyle Burns – Sophomore; 42 – Mike Williams – Sophomore	Outfielders: 3 – Billy Ferriter – (redshirt) Freshman; 4 – George Springer – Sophomore; 20 – Ryan Moore – Sophomore; 23 – John Andreoli – Sophomore; 24 – Matt Burnett – (redshirt) Senior

==== Coaches ====
2010 Connecticut Huskies baseball coaching staff
- 16 – Jim Penders – Head coach – 7th season
- 15 – Justin Blood – Associate head coach/recruiting coordinator – 5th season
- 33 – Steve Malinowski – Assistant coach – 2nd season
- 14 – Chris Podeszwa – Volunteer assistant coach – 7th season

=== Schedule ===
2010 Connecticut Huskies baseball game log
Regular season

February
Date	Opponent	Site/stadium	Score	Win	Loss	Save	Attendance	Overall record	Big East Record
February 26	vs Northwestern	Jack Russell Memorial Stadium • Clearwater, FL (Big East/Big Ten Challenge)	L 5–6^{10}	Jahns (1–1)	Thompson (0–1)	None	357	0–1	
February 27	vs Minnesota	Al Lang Stadium • St. Petersburg, FL (Big East/Big Ten Challenge)	W 8–2	Nappo (1–0)	Rasmussen (0–2)	None	75	1–1	
February 28	vs Indiana	Naimoli Field • St. Petersburg, FL (Big East/Big Ten Challenge)	W 9–5	Barnes (1–0)	Igel (0–2)	None	2,311	2–1	

March
Date	Opponent	Site/stadium	Score	Win	Loss	Save	Attendance	Overall record	Big East Record
March 5	at Cal State Northridge	Matador Field • Northridge, CA	W 7–3	Glynn (1–0)	Juarez (0–1)	None	211	3–1	
March 6	at Cal State Northridge	Matador Field • Northridge, CA	W 11–2	Nappo (2–0)	Tremlin (2–1)	None	163	4–1	
March 7	at Cal State Northridge	Matador Field • Northridge, CA	W 9–7	Hurvel (1–0)	Wilyman (0–1)	None	413	5–1	
March 8	at Cal State Northridge	Matador Field • Northridge, CA	L 3–5	Gorski (2–0)	Butler (0–1)	Jolicoeur (1)	108	5–2	
March 10	at Southern California	Dedeaux Field • Los Angeles, CA	W 5–4	Oberg (1–0)	Garcia (0–1)	Vance (1)	189	6–2	
March 13	at Tennessee	Lindsey Nelson Stadium • Knoxville, TN	L 2–3	Morgado (2–1)	Glynn (1–1)	Locante (1)		6–3	
March 13	vs Marshall	Lindsey Nelson Stadium • Knoxville, TN	L 8–11	Sikula (2–2)	Nappo (2–1)	Coan (3)	1,544	6–4	
March 14	vs Ohio State	Lindsey Nelson Stadium • Knoxville, TN	W 5–4	Barnes (2–0)	McKinney (1–2)	Vance (2)		7–4	
March 16	Boston College	J. O. Christian Field • Storrs, CT	W 8–4	Zaccardo (1–0)	Clemens (1–1)	None	523	8–4	
March 19	at Sacred Heart	The Ballpark at Harbor Yard • Bridgeport, CT	W 15–3	Glynn (2–1)	Balbach (2–1)	None	320	9–4	
March 20	Sacred Heart	J. O. Christian Field • Storrs, CT	L 8–11	Zaccherio (1–1)	Nappo (2–2)	Scribner (2)	714	9–5	
March 21	Sacred Heart	J. O. Christian Field • Storrs, CT	W 9–2	Barnes (3–0)	Corcoran (0–1)	None	529	10–5	
March 22	Northeastern	J. O. Christian Field • Storrs, CT	W 12–1	Butler (1–1)	Ross (0–2)	None	223	11–5	
March 24	Yale	J. O. Christian Field • Storrs, CT	W 7–1	Van Woert (1–0)	Ludwig (2–2)	None	414	12–5	
March 26	at Louisville	Jim Patterson Stadium • Louisville, KY	L 0–1	Royse (5–0)	Glynn (2–2)	Ne Holland (5)	2,532	12–6	0–1
March 27	at Louisville	Jim Patterson Stadium • Louisville, KY	L 2–4	Self (4–0)	Nappo (2–3)	Ne Holland (6)	2,291	12–7	0–2
March 27	at Louisville	Jim Patterson Stadium • Louisville, KY	W 6–3	Barnes (4–0)	Zych (1–2)	Vance (3)	1,019	13–7	1–2

April
Date	Opponent	Site/stadium	Score	Win	Loss	Save	Attendance	Overall record	Big East Record
April 1	at West Virginia	Hawley Field • Morgantown, WV	W 9–5	Glynn (3–2)	Berry (1–2)	Vance (4)	313	14–7	2–2
April 2	at West Virginia	Hawley Field • Morgantown, WV	W 9–2	Nappo (3–3)	Summers (1–4)	None	329	15–7	3–2
April 3	at West Virginia	Hawley Field • Morgantown, WV	W 14–3	Barnes (5–0)	Hinkle (2–2)	None	271	16–7	4–2
April 5	at Hartford	Fiondella Field • West Hartford, CT	W 12–2	Van Woert (2–0)	Mannuccia (0–4)	None	240	16–7	
April 6	UMass	J. O. Christian Field • Storrs, CT	W 10–2	Zaccardo (2–0)	Sorenson (0–1)	None	247	18–7	
April 7	at UMass	Earl Lorden Field • Amherst, MA	W 15–11	Oberg (2–0)	Leigh (0–4)	None	112	19–7	
April 10	Villanova	J. O. Christian Field • Storrs, CT	W 2–1^{10}	Oberg (3–0)	Crimmel (4–1)	None	535	20–7	5–2
April 10	Villanova	J. O. Christian Field • Storrs, CT	W 4–0	Nappo (4–3)	Helisek (3–3)	None	500	21–7	6–2
April 11	Villanova	J. O. Christian Field • Storrs, CT	W 8–2	Barnes (6–0)	McMyne (4–4)	None	432	22–7	7–2
April 13	Hartford	J. O. Christian Field • Storrs, CT	W 19–2	Van Woert (3–0)	Tarner (0–2)	none	127	23–7	
April 14	at Brown	Murray Stadium • Providence, RI	W 15–3	Butler	Boylan	None	132	24–7	
April 16	at Georgetown	Shirley Povich Field • Bethesda, MD	W 9–8	Feehan (1–0)	Vinent (1–1)	Vance (5)	234	25–7	8–2
April 17	at Georgetown	Shirley Povich Field • Bethesda, MD	W 8–2	Nappo (5–3)	Harris (3–4)	None	343	26–7	9–2
April 18	at Georgetown	Shirley Povich Field • Bethesda, MD	W 3–2	Oberg (4–0)	Dennison (2–2)	"Vance (6)'	289	27–7	10–2
April 20	at Fairfield	Alumni Baseball Diamond • Fairfield, CT	W 12–2	DeLazzer (1–0)	Warwick (0–3)	None	125	28–7	
April 21	Rhode Island	J. O. Christian Field • Storrs, CT	W 14–9	Van Woert (4–0)	Bradstreet (2–1)	None	272	29–7	
April 22	at Holy Cross	Fitton Field • Worcester, MA	W 27–10	Hurvul (2–0)	Colella (0–2)	None	202	30–7	
April 23	Rutgers	J. O. Christian Field • Storrs, CT	W 7–2	Glynn (4–2)	Elsing (2–1)	None	537	31–7	11–2
April 24	Rutgers	J. O. Christian Field • Storrs, CT	W 6–3	Nappo (6–3)	Gaynor (5–4)	Feehan (1)	687	32–7	12–2
April 24	Rutgers	J. O. Christian Field • Storrs, CT	W 8–7^{12}	Vance (1–0)	Gebler (1–2)	None	687	33–7	13–2
April 27	Bryant	J. O. Christian Field • Storrs, CT	W 14–6^{8}	Hurvul (3–0)	Ryan (1–5)	None	125	34–7	
April 28	Central Connecticut	J. O. Christian Field • Storrs, CT	L 3–7	Foster (1–1)	Van Woert (4–1)	Krasnowiecki (1)	107	34–8	

May
Date	Opponent	Site/stadium	Score	Win	Loss	Save	Attendance	Overall record	Big East Record
May 1	at Pittsburgh	Petersen Sports Complex • Pittsburgh, PA	W 11–7	Glynn (5–2)	Baker (9–2)	Feehan (2)	445	35–8	14–2
May 1	at Pittsburgh	Petersen Sports Complex • Pittsburgh, PA	L 4–13	Iannazzo (8–1)	Nappo (6–4)	None	355	35–9	14–3
May 2	at Pittsburgh	Petersen Sports Complex • Pittsburgh, PA	Cancelled						
May 8	Cincinnati	J. O. Christian Field • Storrs, CT	W 14–2	Glynn (6–2)	Garman (4–2)	None	189	36–9	15–3
May 8	Cincinnati	J. O. Christian Field • Storrs, CT	W 14–0	Barnes (7–0)	Johnson (1–2)	None	189	37–9	16–3
May 9	Cincinnati	J. O. Christian Field • Storrs, CT	L 2–3	Strenge (5–1)	Nappo (6–5)	None	208	37–10	16–4
May 10	at Boston College	Eddie Pellagrini Diamond at John Shea Field • Chestnut Hill, MA	W 11–7	Van Woert (5–1)	Lasko (2–1)	None	429	38–10	
May 11	Manhattan	J. O. Christian Field • Storrs, CT	W 5–4	Oberg (5–0)	Vance (7)	202	39–10		
May 14	at South Florida	USF Baseball Stadium • Tampa, FL	L 1–12	Fontanez (5–6)	Barnes (7–1)	None	1,025	39–11	16–5
May 15	at South Florida	USF Baseball Stadium • Tampa, FL	W 13–5	Nappo (7–5)	Cole (0–4)	None	1,277	40–11	17–5
May 16	at South Florida	USF Baseball Stadium • Tampa, FL	W10–3^{7.2}	Van Woert (6–1)	Salgueiro (1–2)	None	41–11	18–5	
May 20	Seton Hall	J. O. Christian Field • Storrs, CT	W 7–2	Glynn (7–2)	Dirocco (5–7)	None	314	42–11	19–5
May 21	Seton Hall	J. O. Christian Field • Storrs, CT	W 11–5	Barnes (8–1)	Morris (1–8)	None	509	43–11	20–5
May 22	Seton Hall	J. O. Christian Field • Storrs, CT	L 2–3	Mejia (3–1)	Oberg (5–1)	None	690	43–12	20–6

Postseason

Big East Tournament
Date	Opponent	Site/stadium	Score	Win	Loss	Save	Attendance	Overall record	BET Record
May 26	(7) Cincinnati	Bright House Field • Clearwater, FL	W 9–6	Feehan (2–0)	Garman (4–4)	Vance (8)		44–12	1–0
May 27	(6) Rutgers	Bright House Field • Clearwater, FL	L 5–6	Smorol (5–1)	Barnes (8–2)	Gebler (12)		44–13	1–1
May 28	(3) Pittsburgh	Bright House Field • Clearwater, FL	W 7–2	Nappo (8–5)	Caravella (2–1)	None		45–13	2–1
May 29	(6) Rutgers	Bright House Field • Clearwater, FL	W 11–10^{10}	Ahmed (1–0)	Gebler (1–3)	None		46–13	3–1
May 29	(6) Rutgers	Bright House Field • Clearwater, FL	W 7–4	Butler (3–1)	Elsing (2–2)	Feehan (3)	2,290	47–13	4–1
May 30	(4) St. John's	Bright House Field • Clearwater, FL	L 0–3	Hansen (8–1)	Glynn (7–3)	Burawa (11)	2,418	47–14	4–2

NCAA tournament: Norwich Regional
Date	Opponent	Site/stadium	Score	Win	Loss	Save	Attendance	Overall record	NCAAT record
June 4	(3) Oregon	Senator Thomas J. Dodd Memorial Stadium • Norwich, CT	L 3–5	McGough (5–2)	Oberg (5–2)	Boer (4)	5,684	47–15	0–1
June 5	(4) Central Connecticut	Senator Thomas J. Dodd Memorial Stadium • Norwich, CT	W 25–5	DeLazzer (2–0)	Foster	None		48–15	1–1
June 6	(3) Oregon	Senator Thomas J. Dodd Memorial Stadium • Norwich, CT	L 3–4	Latempa (6–3)	Barnes (8–3)	Boer (5)	2,291	48–16	1–2

== 2011 ==
2011 Connecticut Huskies baseball

Big East Regular season Champions Clemson Regional champions

Columbia Super Regional, 0–2
- Conference: Big East Conference
- Record: 45–20–1 (22–5 Big East)
- Head coach: Jim Penders (8th season)
- Assistant coaches: Justin Blood (6th season); Steven Malinowski (3rd season); Chris Podeszwa (8th season)
- Home stadium: J.O. Christian Field

2011 Big East Conference baseball standings
	Conf.						Overall
Team	W		L		T	PCT	W		L		T	PCT
#13 Connecticut †^{y} ‍‍‍	22	–	5	–	0	.815	45	–	20	–	1	.689
St. John's ‍‍‍^{y}	18	–	8	–	0	.692	35	–	22	–	0	.614
Pittsburgh ‍‍‍	16	–	11	–	0	.593	33	–	23	–	0	.589
Seton Hall ‍‍‡‍^{y}	14	–	13	–	0	.519	34	–	25	–	0	.576
Cincinnati ‍‍‍	14	–	13	–	0	.519	30	–	27	–	0	.526
Louisville ‍‍‍	14	–	13	–	0	.519	32	–	29	–	0	.525
West Virginia ‍‍‍	14	–	13	–	0	.519	28	–	27	–	0	.509
Notre Dame ‍‍‍	13	–	13	–	0	.500	23	–	29	–	0	.442
South Florida ‍‍‍	13	–	14	–	0	.481	25	–	29	–	0	.463
Rutgers ‍‍‍	11	–	16	–	0	.407	20	–	30	–	0	.400
Villanova ‍‍‍	7	–	20	–	0	.259	20	–	32	–	0	.385
Georgetown ‍‍‍	5	–	22	–	0	.185	23	–	33	–	0	.411
† – Conference champion ‡ – Tournament champion y – Invited to the NCAA Division I Baseball Championship; As of June 30, 2011; Rankings from Collegiate Baseball

=== Personnel ===
==== Roster ====
2011 Connecticut Huskies roster
Pitchers: 10 – Kevin Vance – Junior; 11 – Will Jolin – (redshirt) Sophomore; 12 – Robert Van Woert – (redshirt) Senior; 18 – David Fischer – Junior; 19 – Stephen Catalina – Sophomore; 20 – Ryan Moore – Sophomore; 21 – Elliot Glynn – Senior; 22 – Dan Feehan – Sophomore; 26 – Matt Barnes – Junior; 31 – Scott Oberg – Junior; 32 – Ted Hurvul – (redshirt) Junior; 33 – Michael Zaccardo – (redshirt) Sophomore; 36 – David Mahoney – Freshman; 39 – Anthony Marzi – Freshman; 40 – Kurt Marut – Freshman; 41 – Greg Nappo – (redshirt) Senior; 30 – Anthony Aceto – Freshman; 43 – Carson Cross – Freshman; 44 – Pat Butler – Sophomore; 45 – Brian Ward – Freshman	Catchers: 2 – Zack Walsh – Freshman; 5 – Joe Pavone – Senior; 8 – Doug Elliot – (redshirt) Senior; 27 – John Sulzicki – Junior; Infielders: 1 – Tim Martin – Junior; 6 – Tom Verdi – Freshman; 7 – Nick Ahmed – Junior; 9 – Mike Friel – Freshman; 13 – Kevin Solomon – Freshman; 24 – L. J. Mazzilli – Sophomore; 29 – Mike Nemeth – Senior; 42 – Ryan Fuller – Junior	Outfielders: 3 – Billy Ferriter – (redshirt) Sophomore; 4 – George Springer – Junior; 23 – John Andreoli – Junior

==== Coaches ====
2011 Connecticut Huskies baseball coaching staff
- 16 – Jim Penders – Head coach – 8th season
- 15 – Justin Blood – Associate head coach/recruiting coordinator – 6th season
- 33 – Steve Malinowski – Assistant coach – 3rd season
- 14 – Chris Podeszwa – Volunteer assistant coach – 8th season

=== Schedule ===
2011 Connecticut Huskies baseball game log
Regular season

February
Date	Opponent	Site/stadium	Score	Win	Loss	Save	Attendance	Overall record	Big East Record
February 18	vs Purdue	Florida Auto Exchange Stadium • Dunedin, FL	L 2–10	Morgan (1–0)	Glynn (0–1)	None	112	0–1	
February 19	vs Minnesota	Jack Russell Stadium • Clearwater, FL	L 2–3	Soule (1–0)	Barnes (0–1)	Matyas (1)		0–2	
February 20	vs Michigan	Jack Russell Stadium • Clearwater, FL	W 16–9	Jolin (1–0)	Sinnery (0–1)	None	565	1–2	
February 25	vs Oregon State	Whataburger Field • Corpus Christi, TX	L 0–2	Gaviglio (1–0)	Glynn (0–2)	None		1–3	
February 26	vs Indiana	Whataburger Field • Corpus Christi, TX	L 1–3	Monar (1–0)	Barnes (0–2)	Martin (1)		1–4	
February 27	at Texas A&M–Corpus Christi	Whataburger Field • Corpus Christi, TX	W 0–7	Nappo (1–0)	Meza (2–1)	None	2,651	2–4	

March
Date	Opponent	Site/stadium	Score	Win	Loss	Save	Attendance	Overall record	Big East Record
March 5	at San Diego State	Tony Gwynn Stadium • San Diego, CA	W 9–3	Fischer (1–0)	Walby (0–1)	None	525	3–4	
March 6	vs California	Tony Gwynn Stadium • San Diego, CA	W 3–1	Barnes (1–2)	Miller (1–1)	Vance (1)	218	4–4	
March 7	at San Diego	Cunningham Stadium • San Diego, CA	W 17–0	Nappo (2–0)	Jensen (0–3)	None	109	5–4	
March 8	at UC Irvine	Anteater Ballpark • Irvine, CA	L 4–5	Ferragamo (1–0)	Fischer (1–1)	Hernandez (1)	614	5–5	
March 10	at San Diego	Cunningham Stadium • San Diego, CA	W 6–4	Van Woert (1–0)	Drummond (1–2)	Vance (2)	137	6–5	
March 11	at San Diego	Cunningham Stadium • San Diego, CA	L 2–3	Paez (1–1)	Glynn (0–3)	Jensen (2)	131	6–6	
March 12	at San Diego	Cunningham Stadium • San Diego, CA	W 4–0	Barnes (2–2)	Pazos (1–1)	None	111	7–6	
March 15	Sacred Heart	Dodd Stadium • Norwich, CT	L 4–5	Hermanson (2–0)	Butler (0–1)	Rafferty (1)	220	7–7	
March 18	vs Rhode Island	CofC Baseball Stadium • Mount Pleasant, SC	L 3–18	Pickering (3–1)	Glynn (0–4)	None		7–8	
March 19	at College of Charleston	CofC Baseball Stadium • Mount Pleasant, SC	W 3–1	Barnes (3–2)	Renfro (3–2)	Vance (3)	536	8–8	
March 20	vs Southern Miss	CofC Baseball Stadium • Mount Pleasant, SC	L 3–6	Thomas (4–1)	Jolin (1–1)	None	273	8–9	
March 22	Holy Cross	J. O. Christian Field • Storrs, CT	T 2–2				236	8–9–1	
March 25	Pittsburgh	J. O. Christian Field • Storrs, CT	W 7–0	Barnes (4–2)	Baker (2–1)	None	195	9–9–1	1–0
March 26	Pittsburgh	J. O. Christian Field • Storrs, CT	W 9–2	Glynn (1–4)	Iannazzo (2–2)	None	250	10–9–1	2–0
March 27	Pittsburgh	J. O. Christian Field • Storrs, CT	L 0–4	Wotherspoon (2–0)	Nappo (2–1)	None	194	10–10–1	2–1
March 29	at Hartford	Fiondella Field • West Hartford, CT	W 11–0	Van Woert (2–0)	Veilleux (0–4)	None	131	11–10–1	

April
Date	Opponent	Site/stadium	Score	Win	Loss	Save	Attendance	Overall record	Big East Record
April 2	St. John's	J. O. Christian Field • Storrs, CT	W 9–1	Barnes (5–2)	Hansen (3–3)	None		12–10–1	3–1
April 2	St. John's	J. O. Christian Field • Storrs, CT	W 6–5	Fischer (2–1)	Carasiti (2–2)	None	250	13–10–1	4–1
April 3	St. John's	J. O. Christian Field • Storrs, CT	W 8–2	Nappo (3–1)	Lobban (3–1)	None	195	14–10–1	5–1
April 6	UMass	J. O. Christian Field • Storrs, CT	W 7–1	Van Woert (3–0)	Machado (2–3)	None	179	15–10–1	
April 8	at Notre Dame	Frank Eck Stadium • Notre Dame, IN	W 3–1	Barnes (6–2)	Dupra (2–3)	Vance (4)	278	16–10–1	6–1
April 9	at Notre Dame	Frank Eck Stadium • Notre Dame, IN	W 6–3	Glynn (2–4)	Johnson (2–5)	Vance (5)	692	17–10–1	7–1
April 10	at Notre Dame	Frank Eck Stadium • Notre Dame, IN	L 4–14	Miller (3–2)	Nappo (3–2)	None	537	17–11–1	7–2
April 12	at Yale	Yale Field • New Haven, CT	L 7–10^{8}	Fortunato (2–1)	Feehan (0–1)	None	94	17–12–1	
April 14	Brown	J. O. Christian Field • Storrs, CT	W 6–2	Butler (1–1)	Hubbard (0–2)	None	212	18–12–1	
April 15	at Villanova	Villanova Ballpark at Plymouth • Plymouth Meeting, PA	W 7–1	Barnes (7–2)	McMyne (3–6)	None	323	19–12–1	8–2
April 15	at Villanova	Villanova Ballpark at Plymouth • Plymouth Meeting, PA	W 10–0	Nappo (4–2)	Helisek (0–5)	None	293	20–12–1	9–2
April 17	at Villanova	Villanova Ballpark at Plymouth • Plymouth Meeting, PA	W 10–2	Ward (1–0)	Ostapeck (2–1)	None	211	21–12–1	10–2
April 18	at UMass	Earl Lorden Field • Amherst, MA	W 18–3	Marzi (1–0)	Popielarczyk (1–1)	Catalina (1)	154	22–12–1	
April 19	Fairfield	J. O. Christian Field • Storrs, CT	W 13–2	Butler (2–1)	McCullough (0–2)	None	118	23–12–1	
April 21	Georgetown	J. O. Christian Field • Storrs, CT	W 5–0	Barnes (8–2)	Polus (1–2)	None	347	24–12–1	11–2
April 22	Georgetown	New Britain Stadium • New Britain, CT	W 14–2	Nappo (5–2)	Steinman (1–4)	None	1,001	24–12–1	12–2
April 22	Georgetown	New Britain Stadium • New Britain, CT	W 6–3	Ward (2–0)	Isaacs (1–2)	Vance (6)	1,457	26–12–1	13–2
April 25	Quinnipiac	J. O. Christian Field • Storrs, CT	W 9–0	Jolin (2–1)	Fabrizio (0–1)	None	246	27–12–1	
April 26	at Bryant	Conaty Park • Smithfield, RI	W 11–6	Feehan (1–1)	Andrews (4–3)	None	115	28–12–1	
April 27	at Central Connecticut	Balf–Savin Field • New Britain, CT	W 16–4	Marzi (2–0)	Boyd (0–2)	Vance (7)	219	29–12–1	
April 29	at Rutgers	Bainton Field • Piscataway, NJ	L 3–8	Gebler (3–4)	Barnes (8–3)	None	278	29–13–1	13–3
April 30	at Rutgers	Bainton Field • Piscataway, NJ	W 8–2	Nappo (6–2)	Smorol (3–6)	None	388	30–13–1	14–3

May
Date	Opponent	Site/stadium	Score	Win	Loss	Save	Attendance	Overall record	Big East Record
May 1	at Rutgers	Bainton Field • Piscataway, NJ	W 6–2	Ward (3–0)	Roe (3–7)	None	312	31–13–1	15–3
May 7	South Florida	Dodd Stadium • Norwich, CT	W 2–1	Barnes (9–3)	Fontanez (5–4)	Vance (8)	840	32–13–1	16–3
May 8	South Florida	J. O. Christian Field • Storrs, CT	W 9–5	Nappo (7–2)	Carlin (1–2)	None	627	33–13–1	17–3
May 9	South Florida	J. O. Christian Field • Storrs, CT	W 2–0	Ward (4–0)	Eastham (3–5)	Vance (9)	312	34–13–1	18–3
May 13	Louisville	Dodd Stadium • Norwich, CT	W 6–2	Barnes (10–3)	Self (2–2)	None	1,088	35–13–1	19–3
May 14	Louisville	J. O. Christian Field • Storrs, CT	W 7–5	Nappo (8–2)	Amlung (8–2)	Vance (10)		36–13–1	20–3
May 14	Louisville	J. O. Christian Field • Storrs, CT	L 3–6^{10}	Flett (2–0)	Feehan (1–2)	Thompson (1)	425	36–14–1	20–4
May 16	at Rhode Island	Bill Beck Field • Kingston, RI	W 4–1	Van Woert (4–0)	Graveline (6–4)	Vance (11)	216	37–14–1	
May 19	at Cincinnati	Marge Schott Stadium • Cincinnati, OH	W 3–1	Barnes (11–3)	Gentile (0–2)	Vance (12)	523	38–14–1	21–4
May 20	at Cincinnati	Marge Schott Stadium • Cincinnati, OH	W 9–5	Nappo (9–2)	Johnson (5–3)	Fischer (1)	956	39–14–1	22–4
May 21	at Cincinnati	Marge Schott Stadium • Cincinnati, OH	L 4–7	Jensen (4–4)	Ward (4–1)	None	728	39–15–1	22–5

Postseason

Big East Tournament
Date	Opponent	Site/stadium	Score	Win	Loss	Save	Attendance	Overall record	BET Record
May 25	Notre Dame	Bright House Field • Clearwater, FL	W 4–2	Feehan (2–2)	Dupra (3–7)	Vance (13)	2,314	40–15–1	1–0
May 26	Seton Hall	Bright House Field • Clearwater, FL	L 3–4^{12}	Harvey (5–2)	Jolin (2–2)	None	2,027	40–16–1	1–1
May 27	Notre Dame	Bright House Field • Clearwater, FL	W 9–3	Ward (5–1)	Norton (2–2)	Fischer (2)	1,706	41–16–1	2–1
May 28	Seton Hall	Bright House Field • Clearwater, FL	L 2–12	Gilbert (2–3)	Van Woert (4–1)	Fernandez (2)		41–17–1	2–2

NCAA tournament: Clemson Regional
Date	Opponent	Site/stadium	Score	Win	Loss	Save	Attendance	Overall record	NCAAT record
June 3	Coastal Carolina	Doug Kingsmore Stadium • Clemson, SC	L 1–13	Meo (10–3)	Barnes (11–4)	None	2,830	41–18–1	0–1
June 4	Sacred Heart	Doug Kingsmore Stadium • Clemson, SC	W 13–3	Butler (3–1)	Leiningen (7–4)	None	2,423	42–18–1	1–1
June 5	Coastal Carolina	Doug Kingsmore Stadium • Clemson, SC	W 12–6	Ward (6–1)	Conway (8–2)	None	2,553	43–18–1	2–1
June 5	Clemson	Doug Kingsmore Stadium • Clemson, SC	W 7–6	Vance (1–0)	Weismann (3–5)	None	4,877	44–18–1	3–1
June 6	Clemson	Doug Kingsmore Stadium • Clemson, SC	W 14–1	Nappo (10–2)	Pohle (5–2)	Feehan (1)	4,838	45–18–1	4–1

NCAA tournament: Columbia Super Regional
Date	Opponent	Site/stadium	Score	Win	Loss	Save	Attendance	Overall record	NCAAT record
June 11	at South Carolina	Carolina Stadium • Columbia, SC	L 1–5	Roth (13–3)'	Barnes (11–5)	None	8,242	45–19–1	0–1
June 12	at South Carolina	Carolina Stadium • Columbia, SC	L 2–8	Taylor (6–1)	Nappo (10–3)	Price (18)	8,242	45–20–1	0–2

== 2012 ==
2012 Connecticut Huskies baseball
- Conference: Big East Conference
- Record: 31–27–1 (16–11 Big East)
- Head coach: Jim Penders (9th season)
- Assistant coaches: Jeff Hourigan (1st season); Joshua McDonald (1st season); Chris Podeszwa (9th season)
- Home stadium: J.O. Christian Field

2012 Big East Conference baseball standings
	Conf.						Overall
Team	W		L		T	PCT	W		L		T	PCT
#25 Louisville †^{y} ‍‍‍	18	–	9	–	0	.667	42	–	22	–	0	.656
St. John's ‍†‍‡‍^{y}	18	–	9	–	0	.667	40	–	23	–	0	.635
Seton Hall ‍‍‍	17	–	10	–	0	.630	34	–	24	–	0	.586
South Florida ‍‍‍	17	–	10	–	0	.630	38	–	22	–	0	.633
Connecticut ‍‍‍	16	–	11	–	0	.593	31	–	27	–	1	.534
Rutgers ‍‍‍	16	–	11	–	0	.593	31	–	25	–	0	.554
Notre Dame ‍‍‍	14	–	13	–	0	.519	31	–	27	–	0	.534
Pittsburgh ‍‍‍	10	–	17	–	0	.370	28	–	28	–	0	.500
Georgetown ‍‍‍	10	–	17	–	0	.370	24	–	29	–	0	.453
Villanova ‍‍‍	10	–	17	–	0	.370	28	–	27	–	0	.509
West Virginia ‍‍‍	9	–	18	–	0	.333	23	–	32	–	0	.418
Cincinnati ‍‍‍	7	–	20	–	0	.259	18	–	38	–	0	.321
† – Conference champion ‡ – Tournament champion y – Invited to the NCAA tournament As of June 15, 2012; Rankings from Coaches' Poll

=== Roster ===
2012 Connecticut Huskies roster
Pitchers: 8 Devin Over – Freshman; 11 Will Jolin – (redshirt) Junior; 13 Max Slade – Freshman; 18 David Fischer – Senior; 19 Stephen Catalina – Junior; 20 Ryan Moore – Junior; 21 Michael Healey – Freshman; 22 Dan Feehan – Junior; 23 Jordan Tabakman – (redshirt) Freshman; 31 Scott Oberg – Junior; 32 Ted Hurvul – (redshirt) Senior; 36 David Mahoney – Freshman; 39 Anthony Marzi – Sophomore; 41 Jared Dettman – Freshman; 43 Carson Cross – Freshman; 44 Pat Butler – Junior; 45 Brian Ward – Sophomore	Catchers: 4 Alex DeBellis – Freshman; 5 Joe Pavone – Senior; 25 Connor David – Freshman; 27 John Sulzicki – Senior; Infielders: 1 Tim Martin – Senior; 3 Ryan Kirman – Freshman; 9 Mike Friel – Sophomore; 12 Tom Verdi – Freshman; 15 Scott DeJong – Freshman; 24 L. J. Mazzilli – Junior; 26 Jon Testani – Freshman; 42 Ryan Fuller – Senior	Outfielders: 7 Billy Ferriter – (redshirt) Junior; 10 Eric Yavarone – Freshman; 34 Stanley Paul – Junior

=== Coaches ===
2012 Connecticut Huskies baseball coaching staff
- 16 – Jim Penders – Head coach – 9th season
- 29 – Jeff Hourigan – Assistant coach/recruiting coordinator – 1st season
- 33 – Joshua MacDonald – Assistant coach – 1st season
- 14 – Chris Podeszwa – Volunteer assistant coach – 9th season

=== Schedule ===
2012 Connecticut Huskies baseball game log
Regular season

February
Date	Opponent	Site/stadium	Score	Win	Loss	Save	Attendance	Overall record	Big East Record
February 17	vs Indiana	Al Lang Stadium • St. Petersburg, FL	W 8–0	Ward (1–0)	Martin (0–1)	None	302	1–0	–
February 18	vs Purdue	Walter Fuller Complex • St. Petersburg, FL	L 4–9	Mascarello (1–0)	Fischer (0–1)	None	301	1–1	–
February 19	vs Ohio State	Jack Russell Memorial Stadium • Clearwater, FL	L 5–9	Fathalikhani (1–0)	Cross (0–1)	None	193	1–2	–
February 24	vs Xavier	CofC Baseball Stadium • Mount Pleasant, SC	W 7–2	Ward (2–0)	Nittoli (0–2)	None	157	2–2	–
February 25	at No. 29 College of Charleston	CofC Baseball Stadium • Mount Pleasant, SC	L 6–10	Powell (2–0)	Butler (0–1)	None	568	2–3	–
February 26	vs Rhode Island	CofC Baseball Stadium • Mount Pleasant, SC	L 0–2	Pisani (2–0)	Marzi (0–1)	None	83	2–4	–

March
Date	Opponent	Site/stadium	Score	Win	Loss	Save	Attendance	Overall record	Big East Record
March 2	vs Lipscomb	Dudy Noble Field • Starkville, MS	W 4–2	Tabakman (1–0)	Sinclair (1–1)	Oberg (1)	DH	3–4	–
March 2	at Mississippi State	Dudy Noble Field • Starkville, MS	L 4–5	Stratton (3–0)	Fischer (0–2)	None	1,036	3–5	–
March 3	at Mississippi State	Dudy Noble Field • Starkville, MS	L 1–3	Routt (1–0)	Marzi (0–1)	Reed (2)	6,150	3–6	–
March 4	vs Lipscomb	Dudy Noble Field • Starkville, MS	W 6–5	Cross (1–1)	Rehwinkel (2–1)	None	356	4–6	–
March 9	vs No. 22 Oklahoma	PK Park • Eugene, OR	W 8–7	Ward (3–0)	Okert, S. (2–1)	Oberg (2)	N/A	5–6	–
March 10	vs Illinois	Goss Stadium at Coleman Field • Corvallis, OR	L 1–5	Kravetz, J. (2–0)	Butler (0–2)	None	108	5–7	–
March 10	at Oregon State	Goss Stadium at Coleman Field • Corvallis, OR	W 6–3	Fischer (1–2)	Brocker, C. (0–2)	Oberg (3)	1,579	6–7	–
March 11	at No. 17 Oregon	PK Park • Eugene, OR	L 0–4	Tessar, B (3–0)	Marzi (0–3)	None	1,123	6–8	–
March 16	vs UAB	Charles Watson Stadium • Conway, SC	L 4–15	Napoleon, D. (3–1)	Ward (3–1)	None	139	6–9	–
March 17	at Coastal Carolina	Charles Watson Stadium • Conway, SC	L 2–6	Conway, J. (2–1)	Marzi (0–4)	Connolly, R. (4)	386	6–10	–
March 18	vs Michigan	BB&T Coastal Field • Myrtle Beach, SC	L 5–7	Clark (2–2)	Fischer (1–3)	Ogden (1)	189	6–11	–
March 21	Yale	J. O. Christian Field • Storrs, CT	W 8–0	Butler (1–2)	O'Hare (1–2)	None	385	7–11	–
March 23	at West Virginia	Hawley Field • Morgantown, WV	W 10–7	Fischer (2–3)	Walter, C (2–3)	Oberg (4)	414	8–11	1–0
March 24	at West Virginia	Hawley Field • Morgantown, WV	W 15–4	Marzi (1–4)	Thompson, M. (2–4)	Jolin (1)	230	9–10	2–0
March 25	at West Virginia	Hawley Field • Morgantown, WV	W 8–1	Tabakman (2–0)	Dierdorff, D. (3–2)	None	259	10–11	3–0
March 27	Hartford	J. O. Christian Field • Storrs, CT	W 11–6	Dettman (1–0)	Barnes (1–2)	None	147	11–11	3–0
March 28	Central Connecticut	J. O. Christian Field • Storrs, CT	W 7–4	Butler (2–2)	Frawley (0–1)	Oberg (5)	128	12–11	3–0
March 30	Seton Hall	J. O. Christian Field • Storrs, CT	W 2–1^{11}	Oberg (1–0)	Ras (0–1)	None		13–11	4–0
March 31	Seton Hall	J. O. Christian Field • Storrs, CT	L 6–10	Harvey (2–2)	Ward (3–2)	Lopez (2)	244	13–12	4–1

April
Date	Opponent	Site/stadium	Score	Win	Loss	Save	Attendance	Overall record	Big East Record
April 1	Seton Hall	J. O. Christian Field • Storrs, CT	W 7–1	Marzi (2–4)	Gilbert (1–3)	None	281	14–12	5–1
April 2	at Massachusetts	Earl Lorden Field • Amherst, MA	W 12–5	Dettman (2–0)	Stoops (0–1)		105	15–12	5–1
April 3	at Boston College	Eddie Pellagrini Diamond at John Shea Field • Chestnut Hill, MA	L 5–8	Bayuk (2–1)	Butler (2–3)	Prohovich (2)	89	15–13	5–1
April 5	at Pittsburgh	Petersen Sports Complex • Pittsburgh, PA	W 8–2	Fischer (3–3)	Ianozzo (4–2)	None	335	16–13	6–1
April 6	at Pittsburgh	Petersen Sports Complex • Pittsburgh, PA	W 3–1	Tabakman (3–0)	Mildren (3–2)	Oberg (6)	488	17–13	7–1
April 7	at Pittsburgh	Petersen Sports Complex • Pittsburgh, PA	W 5–3	Oberg (2–0)	Wilt	None	285	18–13	8–1
April 9	at Quinnipiac	Quinnipiac Baseball Field • Hamden, CT	W 12–7	Hurvul (1–0)	Walsh (0–1)	None	250	19–13	8–1
April 11	at Brown	Murray Stadium • Providence, RI	L 7–8	Wright (1–3)	Feehan (0–1)	None	245	19–14	8–1
April 13	at St. John's	Jack Kaiser Stadium • Queens, NY	L 2–7	Carasiti (3–2)	Fischer (3–4)	Rivera (2)	244	19–15	8–2
April 14	at St. John's	Jack Kaiser Stadium • Queens, NY	L 2–8	Hagan (4–2)	Tabakman (3–1)	None	278	19–16	8–3
April 15	at St. John's	Jack Kaiser Stadium • Queens, NY	W 8–7^{11}	Oberg (3–0)	Lobban (4–3)	None	323	20–16	9–3
April 17	at Fairfield	Alumni Baseball Diamond • Fairfield, CT	W 13–8	Mahoney (1–0)	Bordonaro (2–4)	None	417	21–16	9–3
April 20	Rutgers	J. O. Christian Field • Storrs, CT	W 9–8	Oberg (4–0)	Law (1–3)	None	331	22–16	10–3
April 20	Rutgers	Dodd Stadium • Norwich, CT	W 9–8^{10}	Feehan (1–1)	Elsing (0–2)	None	DH	23–16	11–3
April 21	Rutgers	J. O. Christian Field • Storrs, CT	L 0–15	Fasano (4–3)	Marzi (2–5)	None	414	23–17	11–4
April 24	Bryant	J. O. Christian Field • Storrs, CT	L 1–7	O'Neil (2–2)	Dettman (2–1)	None	111	23–18	11–4
April 27	at No. 23 Louisville	Jim Patterson Stadium • Louisville, KY	L 0–5	Amlung (7–3)	Fischer (3–5)	None	1,652	23–19	11–5
April 28	at No. 23 Louisville	Jim Patterson Stadium • Louisville, KY	L 6–14	Kime (1–0)	Ward (3–3)	None	1,581	23–20	11–6
April 29	at No. 23 Louisville	Jim Patterson Stadium • Louisville, KY	W 7–4	Oberg (5–0)	Koch (0–2)	None	1,722	24–20	12–6

May
Date	Opponent	Site/stadium	Score	Win	Loss	Save	Attendance	Overall record	Big East Record
May 5	Cincinnati	Dodd Stadium • Norwich, CT	L 0–1	Morris (3–3)	Marzi (2–6)	None	421	24–21	12–7
May 5	Cincinnati	Dodd Stadium • Norwich, CT	W 4–3	Cross (2–1)	McElroy (2–5)	None	348	25–21	13–7
May 6	Cincinnati	J. O. Christian Field • Storrs, CT	W 6–4^{13}	Moore (1–0)	McElroy (1–5)	None	352	26–21	14–7
May 9	at Northeastern	Parsons Field • Brookline, MA	W 8–7	Will (1–0)	Cook (1–6)	Cross (1)	43	27–21	14–7
May 11	at South Florida	USF Baseball Stadium • Tampa, FL	L 2–3	Barbosa (7–4)	Fischer (3–4)	Adams (3)	1,454	27–22	14–8
May 12	at South Florida	USF Baseball Stadium • Tampa, FL	L 0–3	Stultz (8–1)	Marzi (2–7)	Gonzalez (2)	1,206	27–23	14–9
May 13	at South Florida	USF Baseball Stadium • Tampa, FL	L 3–8	Reed (4–3)	Ward (3–4)	None	985	27–24	14–10
May 15	Rhode Island	Dodd Stadium • Norwich, CT	T 2–2				1,184	27–24–1	14–10
May 17	Notre Dame	J. O. Christian Field • Storrs, CT	W 2–1	Fischer (4–6)	Hudgins (4–3)	Oberg (7)	196	28–24–1	15–10
May 18	Notre Dame	New Britain Stadium • New Britain, CT	L 0–4	Fitzgerald (7–3)	Marzi (2–8)	Slania (12)	1,535	28–25–1	15–11
May 19	Notre Dame	J. O. Christian Field • Storrs, CT	W 4–0	Cross (3–1)	Norton (4–5)	None	272	29–25–1	16–11

Postseason

Big East Tournament
Date	Opponent	Site/stadium	Score	Win	Loss	Save	Attendance	Overall record	BET Record
May 23	vs (4) South Florida	Bright House Field • Clearwater, FL	W 7–2	Fischer (5–6)	Barbosa (7–6)	Oberg (7)	None	30–25–1	1–0
May 25	vs (1) No. 26 Louisville	Bright House Field • Clearwater, FL	W 4–1	Marzi (3–8)	Amlung (8–4)	Oberg (9)	None	31–25–1	2–0
May 26	vs (4) South Florida	Bright House Field • Clearwater, FL	L 0–1	Stultz (9–1)	Ward (3–5)	None		31–26–1	2–1
May 26	vs (4) South Florida	Bright House Field • Clearwater, FL	L 1–2	Leasure (2–0)	Feehan (1–2)	Adams (7)	1,217	31–27–1	2–2

== 2013 ==
2013 Connecticut Huskies baseball

Big East tournament Champion

Blacksburg Regional, 1–2
- Conference: Big East Conference
- Record: 35–28 (9–15 Big East)
- Head coach: Jim Penders (10th season)
- Assistant coaches: Jeff Hourigan (2nd season); Joshua McDonald (2nd season); Chris Podeszwa (10th season)
- Home stadium: J.O. Christian Field

2013 Big East Conference baseball standings
	Conf.				Overall
Team	W		L	PCT	W		L	PCT
No. 8 Louisville ‍†‍‍^{y}	20	–	4	.833	51	–	14	.785
Pittsburgh ‍‍‍	18	–	6	.750	42	–	17	.712
Seton Hall ‍‍‍	18	–	6	.750	37	–	19	.661
South Florida ‍‍‍	17	–	7	.708	36	–	22	.621
Rutgers ‍‍‍	14	–	10	.583	28	–	30	.483
St. John's ‍‍‍	10	–	14	.417	23	–	35	.397
Notre Dame ‍‍‍	10	–	14	.417	34	–	24	.586
Connecticut ‍‍‡‍^{y}	9	–	15	.375	35	–	28	.556
Cincinnati ‍‍‍	6	–	18	.250	24	–	32	.429
Georgetown ‍‍‍	5	–	19	.208	25	–	28	.472
Villanova ‍‍‍	5	–	19	.208	14	–	39	.264
† – Conference champion ‡ – Tournament champion y – Invited to the NCAA tournament As of June 18, 2013; Rankings from Collegiate Baseball

=== Roster ===
2013 Connecticut Huskies roster
**Pitchers**: 8 Devin Over – Sophomore; 11 Will Jolin – RS Senior; 13 Max Slade – Sophomore; 15 Ryan Radue – Freshman; 18 Matt D'Ariano – Freshman; 19 Stephen Catalina – Senior; 20 Ryan Moore – Senior; 21 Michael Healey – Sophomore; 22 Dan Feehan – Senior; 23 Jordan Tabakman – Sophomore; 27 Christian Colletti – Freshman; 32 Willie Nastasi – Freshman; 36 David Mahoney – Sophomore; 39 Anthony Marzi – Junior; 40 Michael Niego – Freshman; 41 Nick Fessenden – Junior; 42 Jed Robinson – Freshman; 43 Carson Cross – Sophomore; 44 Pat Butler – Senior; 45 Brian Ward – Junior	**Catchers**: 1 Max McDowell – Freshman; 25 Connor David – Sophomore; 31 Bobby Melley – Freshman; **Infielders**: 2 Bryan Daniello – Freshman; 9 Vinny Siena – Freshman; 12 Tom Verdi – Junior; 24 L. J. Mazzilli – Senior; 26 Jon Testani – Sophomore; 30 Michael Habzda – Junior	**Outfielders**: 4 Jack Sundberg – Freshman; 6 Ryan Brahm – Junior; 8 Billy Ferriter – Senior; 10 Eric Yavarone – Sophomore; 34 Stanley Paul – Senior

=== Coaches ===
2013 Connecticut Huskies baseball coaching staff
- 16 Jim Penders – Head coach – 10th season
- 29 Jeff Hourigan – Assistant coach/recruiting coordinator – 2nd season
- 33 Joshua MacDonald – Assistant coach – 2nd season
- 14 Chris Podeszwa – Volunteer assistant coach – 10th season

=== Schedule ===
A three-game series with Georgetown was moved from Storrs to Hoyas home field Shirley Povich Field in Bethesda, Maryland due to weather conditions. The Huskies remained the designated home team for the series.

Legend
	UConn win
	UConn loss
	Cancellation
**Bold**	UConn team member
*	Non-Conference game

2013 Connecticut Huskies baseball game log
Regular season

February
Date	Opponent	Site/stadium	Score	Win	Loss	Save	Attendance	Overall record	Big East Record
Feb 15	Purdue	Florida Auto Exchange Stadium • Dunedin, FL	**L** 8–11	De LaRiva (1–0)	**Marzi (0–1)**	Kenney (1)	188	0–1	0–0
Feb 16	Indiana	Al Lang Stadium • St. Petersburg, FL	**W** 4–3^{15}	**Feehan (1–0)**	Dearden (0–1)	None	562	1–1	0–0
Feb 17	Purdue	Al Lang Stadium • St. Petersburg, FL	**L** 3–5	Ramer (1–0)	**Ward (0–1)**	None	355	1–2	0–0
Feb 22	at UCF	Jay Bergman Field • Orlando, FL	**L** 3–7	Lively (2–0)	**Marzi (0–2)**	None	1,702	1–3	0–0
Feb 23	Troy	Jay Bergman Field • Orlando, FL	**W** 13–8	**Cross (1–0)**	Brady (1–1)	None		2–3	0–0
Feb 24	Texas Tech	Jay Bergman Field • Orlando, FL	**W** 1–0^{11}	**Moore (1–0)**	McCrummen (0–1)	**Tabakman (1)**	207	3–3	0–0

March
Date	Opponent	Site/stadium	Score	Win	Loss	Save	Attendance	Overall record	Big East Record
Mar 1	Ohio State	Melching Field at Conrad Park • DeLand, FL	**W** 5–2	**Marzi (1–2)**	Long (2–0)	**Butler (1)**		4–3	0–0
Mar 2	Central Michigan	Melching Field at Conrad Park • DeLand, FL	**W** 6–2	**Cross (2–0)**	Kaminska (0–3)	None	211	5–3	0–0
Mar 3	at Stetson	Melching Field at Conrad Park • DeLand, FL	**W** 9–3	**Ward (1–1)**	Perez (1–1)	None	554	6–3	0–0
Mar 8	at Sam Houston State	Don Sanders Stadium • Huntsville, TX	**W** 6–5	**Tabakman (1–0)**	Boyd (2–1)	None	491	7–3	0–0
Mar 9	at Sam Houston State	Don Sanders Stadium • Huntsville, TX	**W** 8–0	**Cross (3–0)**	Dickson (2–2)	None		8–3	0–0
Mar 10	at Sam Houston State	Don Sanders Stadium • Huntsville, TX	**L** 4–6	Simms (1–1)	**Feehan (1–1)**	None	541	8–4	0–0
Mar 13	at Central Connecticut State	CCSU Baseball Field • New Britain, CT	**W** 8–3	**Colletti (1–0)**	Brown (0–1)	**Tabakman (2)**	212	9–4	0–0
Mar 15	at Presbyterian	Presbyterian Baseball Complex • Clinton, SC	**L** 4–6	Dees (3–1)	**Marzi (1–3)**	Trebendis (2)	356	9–5	0–0
Mar 16	at Presbyterian	Fluor Field at the West End • Greenville, SC	**W** 13–2	**Cross (4–0)**	Knox (2–1)	None	691	10–5	0–0
Mar 17	at Presbyterian	Presbyterian Baseball Complex • Clinton, SC	**L** 4–5	Sanders (2–1)	**Mahoney (0–1)**	None	311	10–6	0–0
Mar 19	at College of Charleston	CofC Baseball Stadium • Mount Pleasant, SC	**W** 9–4	**Butler (1–0)**	Ross (1–1)	None	153	11–7	0–0
Mar 22	at Georgetown	Shirley Povich Field • Bethesda, MD	**L** 2–5	Vander Linden (2–0)	**Marzi (1–4)**	Steinman (6)	67	11–8	0–1
Mar 23	at Georgetown	Shirley Povich Field • Bethesda, MD	**W** 6–0	**Cross (5–0)**	Polus (2–2)	**Moore (1)**	150	12–8	1–1
Mar 24	at Georgetown	Shirley Povich Field • Bethesda, MD	**W** 3–2	**Tabakman (2–0)**	Brown (3–1)	**Moore (2)**	59	13–7	2–1
Mar 26	at Hartford	Fiondella Field • West Hartford, CT	**W** 9–1	**Colletti (2–0)**	Lukach (0–2)	None	202	14–7	2–1
Mar 28	at Seton Hall	Owen T. Carroll Field • South Orange, NJ	**L** 3–4^{11}	Gilbert (1–3)	**Feehan (1–3)**	None	206	14–8	2–2
Mar 28	at Seton Hall	Owen T. Carroll Field • South Orange, NJ	**L** 0–3	Prevost (2–1)	**Ward (1–2)**	Lopez (1)	206	14–9	2–3
Mar 30	at Seton Hall	Owen T. Carroll Field • South Orange, NJ	**W** 3–2	**Tabakman (3–0)**	Lopez (0–2)	**Mahoney (1)**	412	15–9	3–3

April
Date	Opponent	Site/stadium	Score	Win	Loss	Save	Attendance	Overall record	Big East Record
Apr 1	Quinnipiac	J. O. Christian Field • Storrs, CT	**W** 4–2^{7}	**Butler (2–0)**	Castadio (0–1)	None	75	16–9	3–3
Apr 2	Boston College	J. O. Christian Field • Storrs, CT	**L** 4–7	Gorman (2–3)	**Feehan (1–3)**	None	108	16–10	3–3
Apr 3	at Yale	Yale Field • New Haven, CT	**L** 5–15	Hickey (1–2)	**Natasi (0–1)**	None	132	16–11	3–3
Apr 5	St. John's	J. O. Christian Field • Storrs, CT	**L** 0–3	Lomangino (1–2)	**Cross (5–1)**	Graziano (3)	212	16–12	3–4
Apr 6	St. John's	J. O. Christian Field • Storrs, CT	**W** 9–2	**Marzi (2–4)**	Hagan (1–5)	None	193	17–12	4–4
Apr 7	St. John's	J. O. Christian Field • Storrs, CT	**W** 5–4	**Tabakman (4–0)**	Horstman (4–4)	None	284	18–12	5–4
Apr 9	Northeastern	J. O. Christian Field • Storrs, CT	**L** 2–4	Lippert (3–1)	**Colletti (2–1)**	Maki (6)	167	18–13	5–4
Apr 10	Brown	J. O. Christian Field • Storrs, CT	**W** 11–6	**Butler (3–0)**	Smith (0–1)	None	96	19–13	5–4
Apr 12	at Villanova	Villanova Ballpark at Plymouth • Plymouth Meeting, PA	**W** 4–3	**Cross (6–1)**	Young (1–2)	**Tabakman (3)**	107	20–13	6–4
Apr 13	at Villanova	Villanova Ballpark • Plymouth Meeting, PA	**W** 4–1	**Marzi (3–4)**	Ostapeck (0–5)	**Tabakman (4)**	343	21–13	7–4
Apr 14	at Villanova	Villanova Ballpark • Plymouth Meeting, PA	**W** 9–4	**Ward (2–2)**	Harris (3–5)	**Jolin (1)**	413	22–13	8–4
Apr 16	Fairfield	J. O. Christian Field • Storrs, CT	**W** 12–5	**Colletti (3–1)**	Gallagher (0–2)	None	225	23–13	8–4
Apr 19	South Florida	New Britain Stadium • New Britain, CT	**L** 2–3	Herget (5–1)	**Cross (6–2)**	Pardo (1)	456	23–14	8–5
Apr 20	South Florida	J. O. Christian Field • Storrs, CT	**L** 4–7^{15}	Mendez (1–0)	**Jolin (0–1)**	None	264	23–15	8–6
Apr 21	South Florida	J. O. Christian Field • Storrs, CT	**L** 3–4	Lovechio (4–2)	**Ward (2–3)**	None	250	23–16	8–7
Apr 23	UMass	J. O. Christian Field • Storrs, CT	**W** 5–4	**Catalina (1–0)**	Plunkett (0–2)	**Tabakman (5)**	90	24–16	8–7
Apr 24	at Bryant	Bryant Baseball Complex • Smithfield, RI	**W** 11–6	**Feehan (2–3)**	Michaud (4–3)	Mahoney (2)	650	25–16	8–7
Apr 26	at Notre Dame	Frank Eck Stadium • Notre Dame, IN	**L** 2–12	Connaughton (2–2)	**Cross (6–3)**	None		25–17	8–8
Apr 27	at Notre Dame	Frank Eck Stadium • Notre Dame, IN	**L** 3–4	Norton (8–1)	**Mahoney (0–1)**	Slania (10)	620	25–18	8–9
Apr 28	at Notre Dame	Frank Eck Stadium • Notre Dame, IN	**L** 5–12	Hissa (1–0)	**Butler (3–1)**	None	482	25–19	8–10
Apr 30	Sacred Heart	J. O. Christian Field • Storrs, CT	**W** 10–6	**Tabakman (5–0)**	Landers (0–3)	None	257	26–19	8–10

May
Date	Opponent	Site/stadium	Score	Win	Loss	Save	Attendance	Overall record	Big East Record
May 1	Holy Cross	J. O. Christian Field • Storrs, CT	**W** 8–0	**Slade (1–0)**	Ahmed (3–4)	None	312	27–19	8–10
May 3	at Rutgers	Bainton Field • Piscataway, NJ	**W** 3–1	**Cross (7–3)**	Smorol (4–5)	**Butler (2)**	211	28–19	9–10
May 4	at Rutgers	Bainton Field • Piscataway, NJ	**L** 4–9	Law (4–5)	**Marzi (3–5)**	Roe (4)	423	28–20	9–11
May 5	at Rutgers	Bainton Field • Piscataway, NJ	**L** 2–4	Corsi (3–3)	**Feehan (2–4)**	Gebler (1)	411	28–21	9–12
May 11	#12 Louisville	J. O. Christian Field • Storrs, CT	**L** 0–8	Green (8–2)	**Cross (7–4)**	None	107	28–22	9–13
May 11	#12 Louisville	J. O. Christian Field • Storrs, CT	**L** 0–6	Thompson (9–1)	**Marzi (3–6)**	None	88	28–23	9–14
May 12	#12 Louisville	J. O. Christian Field • Storrs, CT	**L** 1–3	Kime (5–1)	**Tabakman (5–1)**	Burdi (11)	245	28–24	9–15
May 14	at Rhode Island	Bill Beck Field • Kingston, RI	**L** 3–7	Mantle (5–1)	**Colletti (3–2)**	None	3,124	28–25	9–15
May 16	at George Mason	Spuhler Field • Fairfax, VA	**W** 7–3	**Cross (8–4)**	Gaynor (2–9)	None	137	29–25	9–15
May 17	at George Mason	Spuhler Field • Fairfax, VA	**W** 9–1	**Marzi (4–6)**	Williams (2–6)	None	170	30–25	9–15
May 18	at George Mason	Spuhler Field • Fairfax, VA	**L** 3–4	Montefusco (5–5)	**Tabakman (5–2)**	Mocabee (1)	180	30–26	9–15

Postseason

Big East Tournament
Date	Rank	Opponent	Site/stadium	Score	Win	Loss	Save	Attendance	Overall record	BET Record
May 22	(8)	(1) #8 Louisville	Bright House Networks Field • Clearwater, FL	**W** 3–2^{12}	**Mahoney (1–2)**	Burdi (2–2)	**Butler (3)**	1,872	31–26	1–0
May 23	(8)	(4) South Florida	Bright House Networks Field • Clearwater, FL	**W** 8–7	**Mahoney (2–2)**	Strittmatter (0–1)	None	1,683	32–26	2–0
May 25	(8)	(5) Rutgers	Bright House Networks Field • Clearwater, FL	**W** 2–1	**Tabakman (6–2)**	Corsi (3–4)	**Butler (4)**		33–26	3–0
May 26	(8)	(7) Notre Dame	Bright House Networks Field • Clearwater, FL	**W** 8–1	**Marzi (5–6)**	Norton (10–5)	None		34–26	4–0

NCAA Blacksburg Regional
Date	Rank	Opponent	Site/stadium	Score	Win	Loss	Save	Attendance	Overall record	NCAAT record
May 31	(4)	at #19 Virginia Tech (1)	English Field • Blacksburg, VA	**W** 5–2	**Cross (9–4)**	Mantiply (6–1)	**Butler (8)**	3,566	35–26	1–0
June 1	(4)	#20 Oklahoma (2)	English Field • Blacksburg, VA	**L** 3–5^{12}	Hayes (1–0)	**Butler (3–2)**	None	768	35–27	1–1
June 1	(4)	at #19 Virginia Tech (1)	English Field • Blacksburg, VA	**L** 1–3	Markey (5–4)	**Marzi (5–7)**	Labitan (11)	1,203	35–28	1–2

=== Awards and honors ===
Pitcher of the Week

- Carson Cross (March 18–24)

== 2014 ==
2014 Connecticut Huskies baseball
- Conference: American Athletic Conference
- Record: 27–31 (9–14 The American)
- Head coach: Jim Penders (11th season)
- Assistant coaches: Jeff Hourigan (3rd season); Joshua McDonald (3rd season); Chris Podeszwa (11th season)
- Home stadium: J.O. Christian Field

2014 American Athletic Conference baseball standings
	Conf.				Overall
Team	W		L	PCT	W		L	PCT
No. 7 Louisville ‍†‍‍^{y}	19	–	5	.792	50	–	17	.746
UCF ‍‍‍	17	–	7	.708	36	–	23	.610
No. 11 Houston ‍‍‡‍^{y}	14	–	9	.609	48	–	18	.727
Rutgers ‍‍‍	14	–	9	.609	30	–	25	.545
South Florida ‍‍‍	10	–	14	.417	27	–	31	.466
Temple ‍‍‍	9	–	14	.391	15	–	32	.319
Connecticut ‍‍‍	9	–	14	.391	27	–	31	.466
Memphis ‍‍‍	8	–	16	.333	30	–	29	.508
Cincinnati ‍‍‍	6	–	18	.250	22	–	31	.415
† – Conference champion ‡ – Tournament champion y – Invited to the NCAA tournament As of June 26, 2014; Rankings from Collegiate Baseball

=== Roster ===
2014 Connecticut Huskies roster
**Pitchers**: 8 – Devin Over – (redshirt) Sophomore; 13 – Max Slade – (redshirt) Sophomore; 15 – Ryan Radue – (redshirt) Freshman; 18 – Anthony Kay – Freshman; 19 – Cody Olsen – Freshman; 20 – Michael Niego – (redshirt) Freshman; 21 – Patrick Ruotolo – Freshman; 22 – Christian Colletti – Sophomore; 23 – Jordan Tabakman – (redshirt) Junior; 24 – Andrew Zapata – Freshman; 30 – Callahan Brown – (redshirt) Freshman; 36 – David Mahoney – (redshirt) Junior; 37 – Samuel Nepiarsky – Freshman; 39 – Anthony Marzi – Senior; 42 – Trevor Holmes – Freshman; 43 – Carson Cross – (redshirt) Junior; 45 – Brian Ward – Senior; 46 – Gerard Spiegel – Freshman	**Catchers**: 2 – Max McDowell – Sophomore; 25 – Connor David – Junior; **Infielders**: 1 – Bryan Daniello – Sophomore; 3 – Aaron Hill – Freshman; 5 – Nico Darras – Sophomore; 9 – Vinny Siena – Sophomore; 12 – Tom Verdi – Senior; 27 – Blake Davey – Junior; 31 – Bobby Melley – Sophomore; 44 – Ryan Sullivan – Freshman	**Outfielders**: 4 – Jack Sundberg – Sophomore; 7 – Griffin Garabedian – Freshman; 10 – Eric Yavarone – Junior; 26 – Jon Testani – Junior; 40 – Taylor Olmstead – Freshman

=== Coaches ===
2014 Connecticut Huskies baseball coaching staff
- 16 – Jim Penders – Head coach – 11th season
- 29 – Jeff Hourigan – Assistant coach/recruiting coordinator – 3rd season
- 33 – Joshua MacDonald – Assistant coach – 3rd season
- 14 – Chris Podeszwa – Volunteer assistant coach – 11th season

=== Schedule ===
Legend
	UConn win
	UConn loss
	Cancellation
**Bold**	UConn team member
*	Non-Conference game

2014 Connecticut Huskies baseball game log
Regular season

February
Date	Opponent	Site/stadium	Score	Win	Loss	Save	Attendance	Overall record	AAC Record
Feb 14	vs. Ohio State	Charlotte Sports Park • Port Charlotte, FL	**L** 2–8	Greve (1–0)	**Tabakman (0–1)**	Lakins (1)	389	0–1	
Feb 15	vs. Indiana State	Charlotte Sports Park • Port Charlotte, FL	**L** 0–3	Stagg (1–0)	**Marzi (0–1)**	Keaffaber (1)	157	0–2	
Feb 16	vs. Auburn	Charlotte Sports Park • Port Charlotte, FL	**L** 3–7	Thompson (1–0)	**Ward (0–1)**	None	376	0–3	
Feb 21	vs. Wichita State	Charles Watson Stadium • Conway, SC	**W** 2–1^{10}	**Kay (1–0)**	Ashford (1–0)	None	217	1–3	
Feb 22	vs. George Mason	Charles Watson Stadium • Conway, SC	**W** 11–2	**Marzi (1–1)**	Kardas (0–1)	None	107	2–3	
Feb 23	at Coastal Carolina	Charles Watson Stadium • Conway, SC	**W** 6–0	**Ward (1–1)**	Kravetz (0–1)	None	210	3–3	
Feb 28	at Lipscomb	Ken Dugan Field • Nashville, TN	**W** 6–4^{10}	**Ruotolo (1–0)**	Ashcraft (0–2)	None	211	4–3	

March
Date	Opponent	Site/stadium	Score	Win	Loss	Save	Attendance	Overall record	AAC Record
Mar 1	at Lipscomb	Ken Dugan Field • Nashville, TN	**L** 3–4^{10}	**Ziegler (2–0)**	Zapata (0–1)	None	342	4–4	
Mar 2	at Lipscomb	Ken Dugan Field • Nashville, TN	**L** 1–14	Norman (1–1)	**Ward (1–2)**	Knott (1)	201	4–5	
Mar 7	at Florida	McKethan Stadium • Gainesville, FL	**L** 0–1^{11}	Hanhold (2–1)	**Ruotolo (1–1)**	None	2,535	4–6	
Mar 8	at Florida	McKethan Stadium • Gainesville, FL	**L** 1–2^{10}	Poyner (2–2)	**Slade (0–1)**	None	3,092	4–7	
Mar 9	at Florida	McKethan Stadium • Gainesville, FL	**L** 5–6^{10}	Poyner (3–2)	**Ruotolo (1–2)**	None	3,015	4–8	
Mar 11	at Sacred Heart	Baseball Heaven • Yaphank, NY	**W** 5–0	**Zapata (1–0)**	Maguire (0–2)	None	76	5–8	
Mar 14	vs. Saint Peter's	Hank DeVincent Field • Philadelphia, PA	**W** 10–1	**Tabakman (1–1)**	Hopf (1–2)	None		6–8	
Mar 15	at La Salle	Hank DeVincent Field • Philadelphia, PA	**W** 17–1	**Marzi (2–1)**	Andujar (0–6)	None	318	7–8	
Mar 16	at Villanova	Villanova Ballpark at Plymouth • Plymouth Meeting, PA	**W** 7–6	**Kay (1–1)**	Almonte (1–1)	**Mahoney (1)**	197	8–8	
Mar 18	vs. Harvard	Chain of Lakes Park • Winter Haven, FL	**W** 9–4	**Slade (1–1)**	Coman (0–1)	None	45	9–8	
Mar 19	vs. Central Connecticut	Chain of Lakes Park • Winter Haven, FL	**W** 6–1^{10}	**Mahoney (1–0)**	Severino (0–2)	None	40	10–8	
Mar 21	at South Florida	USF Baseball Stadium • Tampa, FL	**L** 1–2	Herget (3–3)	**Over (0–1)**	Strittmatter (1)	1,250	10–9	0–1
Mar 22	at South Florida	USF Baseball Stadium • Tampa, FL	**L** 1–2	Strittmatter (1–0)	**Marzi (2–2)**	None	1,328	10–10	0–2
Mar 23	at South Florida	USF Baseball Stadium • Tampa, FL	**W** 4–2	**Ward (2–2)**	Farley (1–2)	**Mahoney (2)**	1,130	11–10	1–2
Mar 25	Hartford	Fiondella Field • West Hartford, CT	**L** 2–3	Mellin (1–0)	**Ruotolo (1–3)**	None	164	11–11	
Mar 28	Rutgers	J. O. Christian Field • Storrs, CT	**L** 5–7	Baxter (1–3)	**Kay (2–1)**	Brey (1)	87	11–12	1–3
Mar 29	Rutgers	J. O. Christian Field • Storrs, CT	**W** 11–4	**Marzi (3–2)**	Rosa (2–1)	None	77	12–12	2–3
Mar 30	Rutgers	J. O. Christian Field • Storrs, CT	Cancelled						

April
Date	Opponent	Site/stadium	Score	Win	Loss	Save	Attendance	Overall record	AAC Record
Apr 1	at Boston College	Shea Field • Chestnut Hill, MA	**L** 1–2	Fernandes (1–1)	**Mahoney (1–1)**	None	207	12–13	
Apr 2	Yale	J. O. Christian Field • Storrs, CT	**W** 14–1	**Tabakman (2–1)**	Hsieh (0–1)	None	105	13–13	
Apr 4	Bryant	Dodd Stadium • Norwich, CT	**L** 2–7	Mcavoy (4–1)	**Marzi (3–3)**	None	205	13–14	
Apr 5	Stony Brook	Dodd Stadium • Norwich, CT	**L** 3–6	Knesnik (1–1)	**Kay (2–2)**	Tatelman (1)	520	13–15	
Apr 6	Bryant	Dodd Stadium • Norwich, CT	**L** 3–5	Bingel (1–1)	**Mahoney (1–2)**	None	623	13–16	
Apr 8	at Northeastern	Parsons Field • Brookline, MA	**W** 2–0	**Zapata (2–1)**	Cubarney (0–2)	**Ruotolo (1)**	88	14–16	
Apr 9	Brown	J. O. Christian Field • Storrs, CT	**W** 7–4	**Slade (2–1)**	Ritchie (1–1)	**Mahoney (3)**	94	15–16	
Apr 11	at Cincinnati	Marge Schott Stadium • Cincinnati, OH	**L** 1–3	Walsh (3–5)	**Marzi (3–4)**	None	551	15–17	2–4
Apr 12	at Cincinnati	Marge Schott Stadium • Cincinnati, OH	**W** 7–2	**Tabakman (3–1)**	Atkinson (4–2)	None	1,347	16–17	3–4
Apr 13	at Cincinnati	Marge Schott Stadium • Cincinnati, OH	**W** 14–3	**Kay (3–2)**	Zellner (2–3)	None	879	17–17	4–4
Apr 15	at Fairfield	Alumni Baseball Diamond • Fairfield, CT	Cancelled						
Apr 17	Temple	J. O. Christian Field • Storrs, CT	**W** 4–1	**Marzi (4–3)**	Hockenberry (4–3)	**Ruotolo (2)**	111	18–17	5–4
Apr 18	Temple	J. O. Christian Field • Storrs, CT	**L** 4–7^{14}	Krall (1–0)	**Mahoney (1–3)**	None	209	18–18	5–5
Apr 19	Temple	J. O. Christian Field • Storrs, CT	**L** 2–6	Kuehn (3–2)	**Kay (3–3)**	None	275	18–19	5–6
Apr 21	Central Connecticut	J. O. Christian Field • Storrs, CT	**W** 9–1	**Ward (3–2)**	Severino (2–3)	None	184	19–19	
Apr 22	at UMass	Earl Lorden Field • Amherst, MA	**W** 8–5	**Brown (1–0)**	Cassidy (0–1)	**Mahoney (4)**	123	20–19	
Apr 23	at Quinnipiac	Quinnipiac Baseball Field • Hamden, CT	**W** 5–3	**Zapata (3–1)**	Osieja (4–2)	**Mahoney (5)**	150	21–19	
Apr 25	at #23 Louisville	Jim Patterson Stadium • Louisville, KY	**L** 0–2	Funkhouser (8–2)	**Marzi (4–5)**	Burdi (10)	2,246	21–20	5–7
Apr 26	at #23 Louisville	Jim Patterson Stadium • Louisville, KY	**L** 1–6	Ruxer (7–1)	**Tabakman (3–2)**	Harrington (1)	1,667	21–21	5–8
Apr 27	at #23 Louisville	Jim Patterson Stadium • Louisville, KY	**L** 2–8	Kidston (5–0)	**Kay (3–4)**	None	1,909	22–21	5–9
Apr 29	UMass	Earl Lorden Field • Amherst, MA	**L** 4–5	Mackintosh (1–0)	**Zapata (3–2)**	Walsh (2)	110	21–23	
Apr 30	at Holy Cross	Fitton Field • Worcester, MA	Cancelled						

May
Date	Opponent	Site/stadium	Score	Win	Loss	Save	Attendance	Overall record	AAC Record
May 2	at Memphis	FedExPark • Memphis, TN	**W** 8–5	**Mahoney (2–3)**	Caufield (1–2)	**Over (1)**	794	22–23	6–9
May 3	at Memphis	FedExPark • Memphis, TN	**L** 1–6	Reed (6–2)	**Tabakman (3–3)**	None	904	22–24	6–10
May 4	at Memphis	FedExPark • Memphis, TN	**W** 13–2^{7}	**Kay (4–4)**	Toscano (3–4)	None	707	23–24	7–10
May 10	#25 Houston	J. O. Christian Field • Storrs, CT	**L** 1–3	Marzi (4–6)	**Garza (7–4)**	None	113	23–25	7–11
May 10	#25 Houston	J. O. Christian Field • Storrs, CT	**L** 2–7	Lemoine (6–4)	**Tabakman (3–4)**	Ford (3)	107	23–26	7–12
May 11	#25 Houston	J. O. Christian Field • Storrs, CT	**L** 4–8	Wellbrock (4–0)	**Mahoney (2–4)**	None	84	23–27	7–13
May 13	Rhode Island	Dodd Stadium • Norwich, CT	**W** 7–0	**Ward (4–2)**	Wessel (2–3)	None	1,600	24–27	
May 13	Rhode Island	Dodd Stadium • Norwich, CT	**L** 9–12^{13}	Doonan (1–1)	**Slade (2–2)**	None	285	24–28	
May 15	UCF	J. O. Christian Field • Storrs, CT	**W** 5–4	**Marzi (5–6)**	Skoglund (9–2)	**Kay (1)**	108	25–28	8–13
May 16	UCF	New Britain Stadium • New Britain, CT	**W** 6–5	**Kay (5–4)**	Favre (1–1)	None	116	26–28	9–13
May 17	UCF	J. O. Christian Field • Storrs, CT	**L** 6–7	Howell (3–1)	**Brown (1–1)**	Thomas (1)	127	26–29	9–14

Postseason

AAC Tournament
Date	Rank	Opponent	Site/stadium	Score	Win	Loss	Save	Attendance	Overall record	AACT Record
May 21	(7)	(2) UCF	Bright House Networks Field • Clearwater, FL	**L** 1–7	Rodgers (7–1)	**Marzi (5–7)**	None		26–30	0–1
May 22	(7)	#19 (3) Houston	Bright House Networks Field • Clearwater, FL	**W** 7–2	**Tabakman (4–4)**	Lemoine (6–6)	**Kay (2)**		27–30	1–1
May 24	(7)	(6) Temple	Bright House Networks Field • Clearwater, FL	**L** 4–9	Kuehn (4–2)	**Ward (4–3)**	None		27–31	1–2

Rankings from Collegiate Baseball. Parentheses indicate tournament rankings.

== 2015 ==
2015 Connecticut Huskies baseball
- Conference: American Athletic Conference
- Record: 35–25 (11–13 The American)
- Head coach: Jim Penders (12th season)
- Assistant coaches: Jeff Hourigan (4th season); Joshua McDonald (4th season); Chris Podeszwa (12th season)
- Home stadium: J.O. Christian Field

2015 American Athletic Conference baseball standings
	Conf.						Overall
Team	W		L		T	PCT	W		L		T	PCT
Houston ‍†‍‍^{y}	16	–	8	–	0	.667	43	–	20	–	0	.683
East Carolina‡^{y} ‍‍‍	15	–	9	–	0	.625	40	–	22	–	0	.645
Tulane ‍‍‍^{y}	13	–	11	–	0	.542	35	–	25	–	0	.583
South Florida^{y} ‍‍‍	13	–	11	–	0	.542	34	–	26	–	1	.566
Memphis ‍‍‍	12	–	12	–	0	.500	37	–	21	–	0	.638
Connecticut ‍‍‍	11	–	13	–	0	.458	35	–	25	–	0	.583
UCF ‍‍‍	10	–	14	–	0	.417	31	–	27	–	0	.534
Cincinnati ‍‍‍	6	–	18	–	0	.250	15	–	41	–	0	.268
† – Conference champion ‡ – Tournament champion y – Invited to the NCAA tournament As of June 30, 2015; Rankings from Collegiate Baseball

=== Personnel ===
==== Roster ====
2015 Connecticut Huskies roster
**Pitchers**: 8 – Devin Over – (redshirt) Junior; 12 – Joe Rivera – Freshman; 13 – Max Slade – (redshirt) Junior; 15 – Ryan Radue – (redshirt) Sophomore; 18 – Anthony Kay – Sophomore; 21 – Patrick Ruotolo – Sophomore; 23 – Jordan Tabakman – (redshirt) Senior; 24 – Andrew Zapata – Sophomore; 30 – Callahan Brown – (redshirt) Sophomore; 31 – William Montgomerie – Freshman; 32 – Jack Riley – Freshman; 37 – Samuel Nepiarsky – (redshirt) Freshman; 39 – CJ Dandeneau – Freshman; 41 – Nico Darras – Junior; 42 – Trevor Holmes – (redshirt) Freshman; 43 – Carson Cross – (redshirt) Senior; 45 – Dan Rajkowski – Freshman	**Catchers**: 2 – Max McDowell – Junior; 5 – Alex LeFevre – Junior; 6 – Willy Yahn – Freshman; 25 – Connor David – Senior; **Infielders**: 1 – Bryan Daniello – Junior; 3 – Aaron Hill – Sophomore; 9 – Vinny Siena – Junior; 11 – Bobby Melley – Junior; 19 – Nick Lamberti – Freshman; 20 – Connor Buckley – Junior; 22 – Joe DeRoche-Duffin – Junior	**Outfielders**: 4 – Jack Sundberg – Junior; 7 – Griffin Garabedian – Sophomore; 10 – Eric Yavarone – Senior; 26 – Jon Testani – Senior; 27 – Blake Davey – Senior; 40 – Taylor Olmstead – (redshirt) Freshman; 44 – Troy Stefanski – Freshman

==== Coaches ====
2015 Connecticut Huskies baseball coaching staff
- 16 – Jim Penders – Head coach – 12th season
- 29 – Jeff Hourigan – Assistant coach/recruiting coordinator – 4th season
- 33 – Joshua MacDonald – Assistant coach – 4th season
- 14 – Chris Podeszwa – Volunteer assistant coach – 12th season

=== Schedule ===
Legend
	UConn win
	UConn loss
	Cancellation
**Bold**	UConn team member
*	Non-Conference game

2015 Connecticut Huskies baseball game log
Regular season

February
Date	Opponent	Site/stadium	Score	Win	Loss	Save	Attendance	Overall record	AAC Record
Feb 13	at Florida Atlantic	FAU Baseball Stadium • Boca Raton, FL	**L** 5–16	Miller (1–0)	**Cross (0–1)**	None	504	0–1	
Feb 14	at Florida Atlantic	FAU Baseball Stadium • Boca Raton, FL	**L** 1–2^{10}	Logan (1–0)	**Darras (0–1)**	None		0–2	
Feb 15	at Florida Atlantic	FAU Baseball Stadium • Boca Raton, FL	**L** 4–5	Monkman (1–0)	**Over (0–1)**	None	279	0–3	
Feb 21	vs. Siena	Tradition Field • Port St. Lucie, FL	**W** 12–4	**Cross (1–1)**	Goossens (0–1)	None	84	1–3	
Feb 22	vs. Siena	Tradition Field • Port St. Lucie, FL	**L** 1–3	Amorosi (1–0)	**Kay (0–1)**	Lewicki (1)	154	1–4	
Feb 23	vs. Siena	Tradition Field • Port St. Lucie, FL	**W** 14–1	**Tabakman (1–0)**	Ahearn (0–2)	None	101	2–4	
Feb 27	at No. 28 Kennesaw State	Fred Stillwell Stadium • Kennesaw, GA	**W** 5–3	**Cross (2–1)**	Hillyer (0–1)	**Darras (1)**	355	3–4	
Feb 28	at No. 28 Kennesaw State	Fred Stillwell Stadium • Kennesaw, GA	**W** 7–0	**Kay (1–1)**	Bergen (1–2)	None	355	4–4	

March
Date	Opponent	Site/stadium	Score	Win	Loss	Save	Attendance	Overall record	AAC Record
Mar 1	at No. 28 Kennesaw State	Fred Stillwell Stadium • Kennesaw, GA	**L** 1–6	Friese (2–1)	**Tabakman (1–1)**	None	377	4–5	
Mar 6	at FIU	FIU Baseball Stadium • Miami, FL	**W** 4–1	**Cross (3–1)**	Crouse (1–1)	None	325	5–5	
Mar 7	at FIU	FIU Baseball Stadium • Miami, FL	**W** 5–3	**Kay (2–1)**	Nunez (2–1)	**Ruotolo (1)**	302	6–5	
Mar 8	at FIU	FIU Baseball Stadium • Miami, FL	**L** 4–7	Mourelle (3–1)	**Tabakman (1–2)**	Dopico (2)	298	6–6	
Mar 10	vs Sacred Heart	Joe Nathan Field • Stony Brook, NY	**W** 8–4	**Radue (1–0)**	Stoddard (0–2)	None		7–6	
Mar 14	vs. USC Upstate	Fluor Field at the West End • Greenville, SC	**W** 7–3	**Cross (4–1)**	Boocock (3–2)	None	411	8–6	
Mar 14	vs Furman	Fluor Field at the West End • Greenville, SC	**W** 12–1	**Kay (3–1)**	Solter (0–1)	None	362	9–6	
Mar 15	vs. Michigan State	Fluor Field at the West End • Greenville, SC	**W** 3–1	**Ruotolo (1–0)**	Mockbee (1–1)	None	317	10–6	
Mar 17	at Wake Forest	Gene Hooks Field • Winston-Salem, NC	**L** 2–6	Johnson (1–0)	**Radue (1–1)**	None	431	10–7	
Mar 18	at William & Mary	Plumeri Park • Williamsburg, VA	**W** 12–1	**Darras (1–1)**	Fernandez (1–1)	None	171	11–7	
Mar 21	at Seton Hall	Owen T. Carroll Field • South Orange, NJ	**W** 1–0	**Cross (5–1)**	Prendergast (2–2)	**Ruotolo (2)**	212	12–7	
Mar 22	at Seton Hall	Owen T. Carroll Field • South Orange, NJ	**L** 0–3	McCarthy (2–1)	**Kay (3–2)**	None	110	12–8	
Mar 22	at Seton Hall	Owen T. Carroll Field • South Orange, NJ	**W** 6–3	**Tabakman (2–2)**	Schellenger (0–1)	**Ruotolo (3)**	92	13–8	
Mar 24	at Yale	Yale Field • New Haven, CT	**W** 18–1	**Zapata (1–0)**	Campbell (0–2)	None	113	14–8	
Mar 25	at Central Connecticut	New Britain Stadium • New Britain, CT	**W** 17–2	**Montgomerie (1–0)**	Salintis (1–1)	None	203	15–8	
Mar 27	at Tulane	Greer Field at Turchin Stadium • New Orleans, LA	**W** 6–0	**Cross (6–1)**	Merrill (1–2)	None	1,887	16–8	1–0
Mar 28	at Tulane	Greer Field at Turchin Stadium • New Orleans, LA	**L** 1–5	Gibbs (3–0)	**Kay (3–3)**	None	2,015	16–9	1–1
Mar 29	at Tulane	Greer Field at Turchin Stadium • New Orleans, LA	**W** 5–3	**Ruotolo (2–0)**	Gibaut (4–3)	None	1,950	17–9	2–1
Mar 31	vs. Boston College	New England Baseball Complex • Northborough, MA	**W** 8–7	**Darras (2–1)**	Murphy (0–1)	None	125	18–9	

April
Date	Opponent	Site/stadium	Score	Win	Loss	Save	Attendance	Overall record	AAC Record
Apr 2	South Florida	J. O. Christian Field • Storrs, CT	**L** 6–9	Savarese (1–0)	**Ruotolo (2–1)**	Peterson (9)	243	18–10	2–2
Apr 3	South Florida	New England Baseball Complex • Northborough, MA	**W** 7–0	**Kay**	Mulholland	None		19–10	3–2
Apr 4	South Florida	J. O. Christian Field • Storrs, CT	**L** 6–8	Farley (3–0)	**Ruotolo (2–2)**	Peterson (10)	157	19–11	3–3
Apr 7	Northeastern	J. O. Christian Field • Storrs, CT	**W** 9–1	**Zapata (2–0)**	Borges (0–2)	None	43	20–11	
Apr 8	Hartford	Fiondella Field • West Hartford, CT	**L** 1–6	Mellin (2–1)	**Montgomerie (1–1)**	None	44	20–12	
Apr 10	at No. 13 UCF	Jay Bergman Field • Orlando, FL	**W** 6–4	**Cross (7–1)**	Finfrock (6–2)	**Ruotolo (4)**	1,271	21–12	4–3
Apr 11	at No. 13 UCF	Jay Bergman Field • Orlando, FL	**W** 15–1	**Kay (5–3)**	Howell (4–4)	None	1,061	22–12	5–3
Apr 12	at No. 13 UCF	Jay Bergman Field • Orlando, FL	**L** 1–5	Rodgers (6–0)	**Tabakman (2–3)**	None	898	22–13	5–4
Apr 14	at Fairfield	Alumni Baseball Diamond • Fairfield, CT	**W** 7–0	**Zapata (3–0)**	Dube (3–2)	None	185	23–13	
Apr 15	at Bryant	Conaty Park • Smithfield, RI	**W** 18–5	**Montgomerie (2–1)**	Snyder (1–3)	None	400	24–13	
Apr 17	East Carolina	J. O. Christian Field • Storrs, CT	**L** 3–7	Kruczynski (6–2)	**Cross (7–2)**	Durazo (2)	71	24–14	5–5
Apr 18	East Carolina	J. O. Christian Field • Storrs, CT	**W** 7–3	**Kay (6–3)**	Lucroy (2–3)	**Ruotolo (5)**	305	25–14	6–5
Apr 19	East Carolina	J. O. Christian Field • Storrs, CT	**L** 3–4^{10}	Voliva (1–0)	**Darras (2–2)**	Wolfe (1)	287	25–15	6–6
Apr 21	UMass	J. O. Christian Field • Storrs, CT	**W** 13–2	**Zapata (4–0)**	Cassidy (1–2)	None	173	26–15	
Apr 22	UMass Lowell	J. O. Christian Field • Storrs, CT	**W** 17–2	**Montgomerie (3–1)**	Shea (0–4)	None	138	27–15	
Apr 24	Memphis	J. O. Christian Field • Storrs, CT	**W** 10–1	**Cross (8–2)**	Wallingford (3–6)	None	388	28–15	7–6
Apr 25	Memphis	J. O. Christian Field • Storrs, CT	**L** 3–4	Toscano	**Kay (5–4)**	Caufield		28–16	7–7
Apr 26	Memphis	J. O. Christian Field • Storrs, CT	**L** 1–3^{15}	Blackwood (1–1)	**Ruotolo (2–3)**	None	203	28–17	7–8
Apr 29	Holy Cross	J. O. Christian Field • Storrs, CT	**L** 6–7	Filipowicz (1–0)	**Over (0–2)**	None	179	28–18	

May
Date	Opponent	Site/stadium	Score	Win	Loss	Save	Attendance	Overall record	AAC Record
May 1	at East Carolina	Clark–LeClair Stadium • Greenville, NC	**W** 13–2	**Cross (9–2)**	Kruczynski (6–3)	None	2,272	29–18	8–8
May 2	at East Carolina	Clark–LeClair Stadium • Greenville, NC	**L** 4–5	Love (5–3)	**Kay (6–5)**		3,034	29–19	8–9
May 3	at East Carolina	Clark–LeClair Stadium • Greenville, NC	**L** 2–5	Wolfe (4–1)	**Tabakman (2–4)**	Ingle (3)	3,012	29–20	8–10
May 8	Cincinnati	J. O. Christian Field • Storrs, CT	**W** 12–6	**Cross (10–2)**	Yoakam (3–5)	None	149	30–20	9–10
May 9	Cincinnati	J. O. Christian Field • Storrs, CT	**W** 10–8	**Kay (7–5)**	Zellner (2–3)	**Ruotolo (6)**	229	31–20	10–10
May 10	Cincinnati	J. O. Christian Field • Storrs, CT	**W** 9–4	**Tabakman (3–4)**	Schimmoeller (1–2)	None	286	32–20	11–10
May 12	at Rhode Island	Bill Beck Field • Kingston, RI	**W** 11–5	**Zapata (5–0)**	Whitman (3–3)	None	314	33–20	
May 14	at Houston	Cougar Field • Houston, TX	**L** 4–5^{10}	Fletcher (1–0)	**Ruotolo (2–4)**	None	1,355	33–21	11–11
May 15	at Houston	Cougar Field • Houston, TX	**L** 1–3	Dowdy (8–2)	**Kay (7–6)**	Romero (6)	1,380	33–22	11–12
May 16	at Houston	Cougar Field • Houston, TX	**L** 0–1	Garza (1–3)	**Tabakman (3–5)**	Robinson (1)	1,857	33–23	11–13

Postseason

AAC Tournament
Date	Rank	Opponent	Site/stadium	Score	Win	Loss	Save	Attendance	Overall record	AACT Record
May 20	(6)	(3) Tulane	Bright House Field • Clearwater, FL	**L** 1–3	Duester (7–5)	**Zapata (5–1)**	Gibaut (9)		33–24	0–1
May 21	(6)	(7) UCF	Bright House Field • Clearwater, FL	**W** 4–3^{11}	**Kay (8–6)**	Howell (5–9)	None		34–24	1–1
May 22	(6)	(3) Tulane	Bright House Field • Clearwater, FL	**W** 7–6	**Holmes (1–0)**	Gibbs (5–3)	**Kay (1)**	922	35–24	2–1
May 23	(6)	(2) East Carolina	Bright House Field • Clearwater, FL	**L** 2–4	Wolfe (5–2)	**Montgomerie (3–2)**	Ingle (8)	1,136	35–25	2–2

Rankings from Collegiate Baseball. Parentheses indicate tournament rankings.

== 2016 ==
2016 Connecticut Huskies baseball

AAC Tournament champions

Gainesville Regional, 1–2
- Conference: American Athletic Conference
- Record: 38–25 (14–9 The American)
- Head coach: Jim Penders (13th season)
- Assistant coaches: Jeff Hourigan (5th season); Joshua McDonald (5th season); Chris Podeszwa (13th season)
- Home stadium: J.O. Christian Field

2016 American Athletic Conference baseball standings
	Conf.						Overall
Team	W		L		T	PCT	W		L		T	PCT
No. 25 Tulane ‍†‍‍^{y}	15	–	7	–	0	.682	39	–	19	–	0	.672
No. 15 East Carolina ‍‍‍^{y}	15	–	8	–	1	.646	34	–	21	–	1	.616
Connecticut ‍‍‡‍^{y}	14	–	9	–	0	.609	37	–	23	–	0	.617
Cincinnati ‍‍‍	13	–	10	–	1	.563	26	–	30	–	1	.465
Houston ‍‍‍	11	–	12	–	0	.478	36	–	23	–	0	.610
Memphis ‍‍‍	9	–	15	–	0	.375	22	–	39	–	0	.361
South Florida ‍‍‍	8	–	16	–	0	.333	24	–	33	–	0	.421
UCF ‍‍‍	8	–	16	–	0	.333	26	–	33	–	0	.441
† – Conference champion ‡ – Tournament champion y – Invited to the NCAA tournament As of June 2, 2016; Rankings from Collegiate Baseball

=== Personnel ===
==== Roster ====
2016 Connecticut Huskies roster
**Pitchers**: 8 – Devin Over – (redshirt) Senior; 10 – Doug Domnarski – Junior; 12 – Joe Rivera – Sophomore; 15 – Ryan Radue – (redshirt) Junior; 18 – Anthony Kay – Junior; 19 – P.J. Poulin – Freshman; 21 – Patrick Ruotolo – Junior; 24 – Andrew Zapata – Junior; 30 – John Russell – Sophomore; 31 – William Montgomerie – Sophomore; 32 – Jack Riley – (redshirt) Freshman; 36 – Tim Cate – Freshman; 37 – Sam Nepiarsky – (redshirt) Sophomore; 39 – CJ Dandeneau – (redshirt) Freshman; 41 – Nico Darras – Senior; 42 – Trevor Holmes – (redshirt) Sophomore; 43 – Ronnie Rossomando – Freshman; 44 – Alex Hintze – Freshman; 45 – Dan Rajkowski – (redshirt) Freshman	**Catchers**: 9 – Alex LeFevre – (redshirt) Junior; 23 – Zac Susi – Freshman; **Outfielders**: 3 – Troy Stefanski – Sophomore; 4 – Jack Sundberg – Senior; 7 – Keith Krueger – (redshirt) Junior	**Infielders**: 1 – Bryan Daniello – Senior; 2 – Aaron Hill – Junior; 5 – Jack Lambrecht – Freshman; 6 – Willy Yahn – Sophomore; 11 – Bobby Melley – Senior; 20 – Connor Buckley – Senior; 22 – Joe DeRoche-Duffin – Senior; 25 – Tyler Gnesda – Junior; 26 – Dillon Malandro – Freshman; 27 – John Toppa – Freshman; 34 – Randy Polonia – Freshman

==== Coaches ====
2016 Connecticut Huskies baseball coaching staff
- 16 – Jim Penders – Head coach – 13th season
- 29 – Jeff Hourigan – Assistant coach/recruiting coordinator – 5th season
- 33 – Joshua MacDonald – Assistant coach – 5th season
- 14 – Chris Podeszwa – Volunteer assistant coach – 13th season

=== Schedule ===
Legend
	UConn win
	UConn loss
	Cancellation
**Bold**	UConn team member
*	Non-Conference game

2016 Connecticut Huskies baseball game log
Regular season

February
Date	Opponent	Site/stadium	Score	Win	Loss	Save	Attendance	Overall record	AAC Record
February 19	at UTSA	Roadrunner Field • San Antonio, TX	**L** 1–2	Herbelin (1–0)	**Over (0–1)**	None	547	0–1	
February 20	at UTSA	Roadrunner Field • San Antonio, TX	**L** 5–6	Craigie (1–0)	**Poulin (0–1)**	None	417	0–2	
February 21	at UTSA	Roadrunner Field • San Antonio, TX	**W** 9–6	**Riley (1–0)**	Griggs (0–1)	**Polonia (1)**	371	1–2	
February 26	vs. No. 12 Missouri State	Raymond C. Hand Park • Clarksville, TN	**W** 12–4	**Kay (1–0)**	Knutson (1–1)	None		2–2	
February 27	at Austin Peay	Raymond C. Hand Park • Clarksville, TN	**W** 19–4	**Montgomerie (1–0)**	Robles (1–1)	None	618	3–2	
February 28	vs. Alcorn State	Raymond C. Hand Park • Clarksville, TN	**W** 25–3	**Zapata (1–0)**	Belmont (0–1)	None		4–2	

March
Date	Opponent	Site/stadium	Score	Win	Loss	Save	Attendance	Overall record	AAC Record
March 4	at Liberty	Liberty Baseball Stadium • Lynchburg, VA	**L** 5–8	Herndon (2–0)	**Kay (1–1)**	None	1,533	4–3	
March 5	at Liberty	Liberty Baseball Stadium • Lynchburg, VA	**W** 7–5^{11}	**Darras (1–0)**	Cole (0–1)	**Polonia (2)**	1,456	5–3	
March 6	at Liberty	Liberty Baseball Stadium • Lynchburg, VA	**L** 4–5	Clouse (2–0)	**Rossomondo (0–1)**	Quarterley (2)	1,456	5–4	
March 22	Yale	J. O. Christian Field • Storrs, CT	**W** 8–2	**Zapata (2–0)**	Kukowski (0–2)	None	512	6–4	
March 11	vs. William & Mary	Matador Field • Northridge, CA	**W** 18–1	**Kay (2–1)**	Brown (1–3)	None	213	7–4	
March 12	vs. William & Mary	Matador Field • Northridge, CA	**W** 3–2	**Polonia (1–0)**	White (0–1)	None	211	8–4	
March 13	at Cal State Northridge	Matador Field • Northridge, CA	**L** 4–12	Rosenberg (2–0)	**Montgomerie (1–1)**	None	319	8–5	
March 13	at Cal State Northridge	Matador Field • Northridge, CA	**L** 1–2	O'Neil (4–0)	**Over (0–2)**	None	346	8–6	
March 16	at Southern California	Dedeaux Field • Los Angeles, CA	**W** 5–4	**Domnarski (1–0)**	Navilhon (0–2)	**Polonia (3)**	284	9–6	
March 18	at No. 21 UC Santa Barbara	Caesar Uyesaka Stadium • Santa Barbara, CA	**L** 3–5	Nelson (4–0)	**Polonia (1–1)**	None	350	9–7	
March 19	at No. 21 UC Santa Barbara	Caesar Uyesaka Stadium • Santa Barbara, CA	**L** 6–9	Hatton (1–0)	**Darras (1–1)**	Bettencourt (2)	340	9–8	
March 20	at No. 21 UC Santa Barbara	Caesar Uyesaka Stadium • Santa Barbara, CA	**L** 2–6	Record (3–1)	**Rossomando (0–2)**	None	300	9–9	
March 23	Central Connecticut	J. O. Christian Field • Storrs, CT	4–8	Gallagher (1–1)	**Zapata (2–1)**	None	358	9–10	
March 25	at Columbia	Robertson Field at Satow Stadium • New York, NY	**L** 3–4	Égly (2–0)	**Kay (2–2)**	None	483	9–11	
March 26	Columbia	J. O. Christian Field • Storrs, CT	**W** 3–0	**Ruotolo (1–0)**	Roy (1–2)	None	344	10–11	
March 26	Columbia	J. O. Christian Field • Storrs, CT	**W** 4–3	**Polonia (2–1)**	RObbins (0–1)	None	298	11–11	
March 29	at Boston College	Eddie Pellagrini Diamond at John Shea Field • Chestnut Hill, MA	**W** 9–4	**Nepiarsky (1–0)**	Lane (1–1)	None	203	12–11	

April
Date	Opponent	Site/stadium	Score	Win	Loss	Save	Attendance	Overall record	AAC Record
April 1	No. 27 Tulane	J. O. Christian Field • Storrs, CT	**W** 9–4	**Kay (3–2)**	Massey (3–2)	None	311	13–11	1–0
April 2	No. 27 Tulane	J. O. Christian Field • Storrs, CT	L' 5–14	Gibbs (2–1)	**Cate (0–1)**	None	198	13–12	1–1
April 3	No. 27 Tulane	J. O. Christian Field • Storrs, CT	Cancelled						
April 6	Hartford	J. O. Christian Field • Storrs, CT	L' 3–4	LaRossa (2–1)	**Dandeneau (0–1)**	Ferguson (5)	117	13–13	
April 8	at Cincinnati	Marge Schott Stadium • Cincinnati, OH	L' 2–3^{13}	Kullman (3–2)	**Nepiarsky (1–1)**	None	241	13–14	1–2
April 9	at Cincinnati	Marge Schott Stadium • Cincinnati, OH	L' 2–3	Perez (4–1)	**Over (0–3)**	Orndorff (2)	558	13–15	1–3
April 10	at Cincinnati	Marge Schott Stadium • Cincinnati, OH	**W** 4–2	**Montgomerie (2–1)**	Ordnorff (2–2)	**Polonia (4)**	412	14–15	2–3
April 12	Fairfield	J. O. Christian Field • Storrs, CT	**W** 2–1	**Rossomando (1–2)**	O'Connor (0–1)	**Ruotolo (1)**	283	15–15	
April 13	Bryant	J. O. Christian Field • Storrs, CT	**W** 6–3	**Rivera (1–0)**	Weiner (0–1)	**Polonia (5)**	322	16–15	
April 15	Houston	J. O. Christian Field • Storrs, CT	**W** 3–2	**Kay (4–2)**	Lantrip (4–5)	**Ruotolo (2)**	421	17–15	3–3
April 16	Houston	J. O. Christian Field • Storrs, CT	**W** 4–1	**Cate (1–1)**	Romero (4–2)	**Polonia (6)**	388	18–15	4–3
April 17	Houston	J. O. Christian Field • Storrs, CT	**W** 9–2	**Montgomerie (3–1)**	Ullom (5–2)	None	431	19–15	5–3
April 19	at UMass	Earl Lorden Field • Amherst, MA	**L** 5–9	Walsh (1–0)	**Rajkowski (0–1)**	Mackintosh (5)	55	19–16	
April 20	at UMass Lowell	Edward A. LeLacheur Park • Lowell, MA	**W** 4–2	**Riley (2–0)**	Veilloux (0–2)	**Ruotolo (3)**	603	20–16	
April 22	at East Carolina	Clark–LeClair Stadium • Greenville, NC	**L** 1–2^{10}	Ingle (5–3)	**Polonia (2–2)**	None		20–17	5–4
April 23	at East Carolina	Clark–LeClair Stadium • Greenville, NC	**W** 5–1	**Cate (2–1)**	Boyd (5–3)	**Ruotolo (4)**	2,988	21–17	6–4
April 24	at East Carolina	Clark–LeClair Stadium • Greenville, NC	**L** 2–3	Wolfe (5–3)	**Mongomerie (3–2)**	Ingle (8)	2,577	21–18	6–5
April 26	at Holy Cross	Fitton Field • Worcester, MA	**W** 5–1	**Rivera (2–0)**	Cronin (0–1)	None	114	22–18	
April 30	at Memphis	FedExPark • Memphis, TN	**W** 11–9	**Kay (5–2)**	Hathcock (4–6)	None	952	23–18	7–5
April 30	at Memphis	FedExPark • Memphis, TN	**W** 11–9	**Polonia (3–2)**	Neel (0–1)	**Ruotolo (5)**	952	24–18	8–5

May
Date	Opponent	Site/stadium	Score	Win	Loss	Save	Attendance	Overall record	AAC Record
May 1	at Memphis	FedExPark • Memphis, TN	**L** 2–3^{6}	Bowlan (2–4)	**Montgomerie (3–3)**	None	433	24–19	8–6
May 7	East Carolina	J. O. Christian Field • Storrs, CT	**L** 3–4	Bridges (1–0)	**Ruotolo (1–1)**	Ingle (10)	295	24–20	8–7
May 7	East Carolina	J. O. Christian Field • Storrs, CT	**L** 9–11	Holba (3–0)	**Polonia (3–3)**	Ingle (11)	198	24–21	8–8
May 8	East Carolina	J. O. Christian Field • Storrs, CT	**L** 2–3	Wolfe (6–3)	**Dandenau (0–2)**	None	177	24–22	8–9
May 10	vs. UMass	J. O. Christian Field • Storrs, CT	**W** 5–0	**Zapata (3–1)**	Geannelis (1–4)	None	211	25–22	
May 11	at Northeastern	Parsons Field • Brookline, MA	**W** 9–8	**Ruotolo (2–1)**	Fitzgerald (3–3)	None	252	26–22	
May 13	UCF	J. O. Christian Field • Storrs, CT	**W** 4–3	**Kay (6–2)**	Hukari (2–3)	**Ruotolo (6)**	231	27–22	9–9
May 14	UCF	J. O. Christian Field • Storrs, CT	**W** 15–8	**Polonia (4–3)**	Thompson (3–5)	None	346	28–22	10–9
May 15	UCF	J. O. Christian Field • Storrs, CT	**W** 3–0	**Montgomerie (4–3)**	Tucker (1–2)	**Ruotolo (7)**	298	29–22	11–9
May 17	Rhode Island	J. O. Christian Field • Storrs, CT	**W** 14–4	**Zapata (4–1)**	Silvestri (0–2)	None	199	30–22	
May 19	at South Florida	USF Baseball Stadium • Tampa, FL	**W** 11–2	**Kay (7–2)**	Sanders (5–5)	None	456	31–22	12–9
May 20	at South Florida	USF Baseball Stadium • Tampa, FL	**W** 7–3	**Cate (3–1)**	Lawson (5–5)	**Ruotolo (8)**	919	32–22	13–9
May 21	at South Florida	USF Baseball Stadium • Tampa, FL	**W** 3–2	**Montgomerie (5–3)**	Clarkson (1–4)	**Ruotolo (9)**	589	33–22	14–9

Postseason

AAC Tournament
Date	Rank	Opponent	Site/stadium	Score	Win	Loss	Save	TV	Attendance	Overall record	AACT Record
May 25	(3)	vs. (6) Memphis	Bright House Field • Clearwater, FL	**W** 6–2	**Kay (8–2)**	Hathcock (5–8)	None	ADN	843	34–22	1–0
May 26	(3)	vs. (7) South Florida	Bright House Field • Clearwater, FL	**W** 9–1	**Cate (4–1)**	Eveld (3–0)	None	ADN	1,012	35–22	2–0
May 28	(3)	vs. (6) Memphis	Bright House Field • Clearwater, FL	**L** 5–9	McNickle (2–1)	**Rossomando (1–3)**	None	ADN	632	35–23	2–1
May 28	(3)	vs. (6) Memphis	Bright House Field • Clearwater, FL	**W** 5–0	**Montgomerie (6–3)**	Bowlan (2–6)	**Ruotolo (10)**	ADN	632	36–23	3–1
May 29	(3)	vs. (5) Houston	Bright House Field • Clearwater, FL	**W** 7–2	**Kay (9–2)**	Lantrip (6–6)	**Ruotolo (11)**	ESPNews	1,018	37–23	4–1

NCAA tournament: Gainesville Regional
Date	Rank	Opponent	Site/stadium	Score	Win	Loss	Save	TV	Attendance	Overall record	Regional Record
June 3	(3)	vs. (2) Georgia Tech	Alfred A. McKethan Stadium • Gainesville, FL	**W** 7–6	**Cate (5–1)**	Ryan (3–4)	**Ruotolo (12)**	ESPN3	1,626	38–23	1–0
June 4	(3)	vs. No. 2 (1) Florida	Alfred A. McKethan Stadium • Gainesville, FL	**L** 5–6	Dunning (5–3)	**Over** (0–4)	Anderson (13)	ESPN3	3,027	38–24	1–1
June 5	(3)	vs. (2) Georgia Tech	Alfred A. McKethan Stadium • Gainesville, FL	**L** 5–7	Gorst (2–1)	**Ruotolo (2–2)**	None	ESPN3	1,577	38–25	1–2

Rankings from Collegiate Baseball. Parentheses indicate tournament rankings.

== 2017 ==
2017 Connecticut Huskies baseball
- Conference: American Athletic Conference
- Record: 21–14 (6–3 The American)
- Head coach: Jim Penders (14th season)
- Assistant coaches: Jeff Hourigan (6th season); Joshua McDonald (6th season); Chris Podeszwa (14th season)
- Home stadium: J.O. Christian Field

2017 American Athletic Conference baseball standings
	Conf.				Overall
Team	W		L	PCT	W		L	PCT
UCF ‍†‍‍^{y}	15	–	9	.625	40	–	22	.645
No. 27 Houston ‍†‍‡‍^{y}	15	–	9	.625	42	–	21	.667
South Florida ‍‍‍^{y}	14	–	10	.583	42	–	19	.689
Connecticut ‍‍‍	14	–	10	.583	33	–	25	.569
Tulane ‍‍‍	13	–	11	.542	27	–	31	.466
Cincinnati ‍‍‍	10	–	14	.417	28	–	30	.483
Memphis ‍‍‍	8	–	16	.333	30	–	29	.508
East Carolina ‍‍‍	7	–	17	.292	32	–	28	.533
† – Conference champion ‡ – Tournament champion y – Invited to the NCAA tournament Rankings from Collegiate Baseball

=== Personnel ===
==== Roster ====
**2017 Connecticut Huskies roster**
**Pitchers**: 10 – Doug Domnarski – Senior; 12 – Joe Rivera – (redshirt) Senior; 18 – Jacob Wallace – Freshman; 19 – P.J. Poulin – Sophomore; 21 – Mason Feole – Freshman; 24 – Andrew Zapata – Senior; 30 – John Russell – Junior; 31 – William Montgomerie – Junior; 32 – Nick Chiseri – Freshman; 34 – Randy Polonia – Sophomore; 36 – Tim Cate – Sophomore; 37 – Sam Nepiarsky – (redshirt) Junior; 38 – Michael Schwartz – Freshman; 39 – CJ Dandeneau – (redshirt) Sophomore; 42 – Trevor Holmes – (redshirt) Junior; 43 – Ronnie Rossomando – Sophomore; 44 – Alex Hintze – (redshirt) Freshman; 45 – Dan Rajkowski – (redshirt) Sophomore	**Catchers**: 4 – Kenny Bergmann – Freshman; 9 – Alex LeFevre – (redshirt) Senior; 23 – Zac Susi – Sophomore; **Outfielders**: 3 – Troy Stefanski – Junior; 7 – Keith Krueger – (redshirt) Senior; 8 – Josh Loeffler – Freshman; 11 – Chris Winkel – Freshman; 13 – Anthony Nucerino – Freshman; 26 – Isaac Feldstein – (redshirt) Junior; 27 – John Toppa – Sophomore	**Infielders**: 1 – Anthony Prato – Freshman; 2 – Aaron Hill – Senior; 5 – Jack Lambrecht – (redshirt) Freshman; 6 – Willy Yahn – Junior; 20 – Conor Moriarty – Freshman; 25 – Tyler Gnesda – Senior

==== Coaches ====
2017 Connecticut Huskies baseball coaching staff
- 16 – Jim Penders – Head coach – 14th season
- 29 – Jeff Hourigan – Assistant coach/recruiting coordinator – 6th season
- 33 – Joshua MacDonald – Assistant coach – 6th season
- 14 – Chris Podeszwa – Volunteer assistant coach – 14th season

=== Schedule ===
Legend
	UConn win
	UConn loss
	Cancellation
**Bold**	UConn team member
*	Non-Conference game

2017 Connecticut Huskies baseball game log
Regular season

February
Date	Opponent	Site/stadium	Score	Win	Loss	Save	Attendance	Overall record	AAC Record
Feb 17	vs UMass Lowell*	Tradition Field • Port St. Lucie, FL	**W** 5–3	**Cate (1–0)**	Kuzia (0–1)	**Russell (1)**	200	1–0	
Feb 18	vs UMass Lowell*	Tradition Field • Port St. Lucie, FL	**W** 7–3	**Montgomerie (1–0)**	Tomczyk (0–1)	None	217	2–0	
Feb 18	vs UMass Lowell*	Tradition Field • Port St. Lucie, FL	**W** 7–1	**Feole (1–0)**	Xirinachs (0–1)	None	217	3–0	
Feb 19	vs UMass Lowell*	Tradition Field • Port St. Lucie, FL	**L** 8–11	Constant (1–0)	**Domnarski (0–1)**	Rand (1)	600	3–1	
Feb 24	at No. 25 Texas*	UFCU Disch–Falk Field • Austin, TX	**L** 1–4	Cooper (1–0)	**Cate (1–1)**	Shugart (1)	4,370	3–2	
Feb 25	at No. 25 Texas*	UFCU Disch–Falk Field • Austin, TX	**W** 2–1	**Montgomerie (2–0)**	Johnston (1–1)	**Russell (2)**	5,187	4–2	
Feb 26	at No. 25 Texas*	UFCU Disch–Falk Field • Austin, TX	**L** 3–9	McKenzie (1–0)	**Domnarski (0–2)**	None	4,292	4–3	

March
Date	Opponent	Site/stadium	Score	Win	Loss	Save	Attendance	Overall record	AAC Record
Mar 3	vs Western Michigan*	Melching Field at Conrad Park • DeLand, FL (Stetson Tournament)	**L** 3–4	Mallwitz (1–0)	**Radue (0–1)**	None	120	4–4	
Mar 4	at Stetson*	Melching Field at Conrad Park • DeLand, FL (Stetson Tournament)	**W** 9–3	**Montgomerie (3–0)**	Perkins (0–2)	**Russell (3)**	705	5–4	
Mar 5	vs Saint Joseph's*	Melching Field at Conrad Park • DeLand, FL (Stetson Tournament)	**W** 11–0	**Feole (2–0)**	Vanderslice (0–2)	None	144	6–4	
Mar 10	at UC Davis*	Dobbins Baseball Complex • Davis, California	**W** 7–4	**Dandeneau (1–0)**	Peters (1–1)	**Russell (4)**	279	7–4	
Mar 11	at UC Davis*	Dobbins Baseball Complex • Davis, CA	**W** 9–6	**Montgomerie (4–0)**	Razo (2–2)	**Russell (5)**	321	8–4	
Mar 12	at UC Davis*	Dobbins Baseball Complex • Davis, CA	**L** 7–8	Stone (2–0)	**Rossamando (0–1)**	None	376	8–5	
Mar 14	at Santa Clara*	Stephen Schott Stadium • Santa Clara, CA	**L** 5–10	Spaguolo (1–1)	**Domnarski (0–3)**	None	164	8–6	
Mar 16	at BYU*	Larry H. Miller Field • Provo, UT	**L** 6–7	Buffo (2–3)	**Radue (0–2)**	Cross (2)	1,099	8–7	
Mar 17	at BYU*	Larry H. Miller Field • Provo, UT	**W** 8–7	**Russell (1–0)**	Cross (1–1)	None	1,538	9–7	
Mar 18	at BYU*	Larry H. Miller Field • Provo, UT	**L** 9–10	Wood (1–0)	**Rajkowski (0–1)**	None	1,622	9–8	
Mar 21	at Central Connecticut*	Balf–Savin Field • New Britain, CT	**W** 7–5	**Rossomando (1–1)**	Wolpiuk (0–1)	**Russell (6)**	245	10–8	
Mar 24	Seton Hall*	J. O. Christian Field • Storrs, CT	**W** 2–1	**Domnarski (1–3)**	Prendergast (3–1)	**Russell (7)**	133	11–8	
Mar 25	Seton Hall*	J. O. Christian Field • Storrs, CT	**L** 2–3	Dana (1–2)	**Montgomerie (4–1)**	Leon (1)	317	11–9	
Mar 26	Seton Hall*	J. O. Christian Field • Storrs, CT	**W** 4–0	Feole (3–0)	McCarthy (1–4)	None	222	12–9	
Mar 29	at Fairfield*	Alumni Baseball Diamond • Fairfield, CT	**W** 6–1	**Rossomando (2–1)**	Pope (0–1)	None	310	13–9	
Mar 31	at No. 16 East Carolina	Clark–LeClair Stadium • Greenville, NC	**W** 3–2	**Cate (2–1)**	Holba, C. (3–1)	**Russell (8)**	2,694	14–9	1–0

April
Date	Opponent	Site/stadium	Score	Win	Loss	Save	Attendance	Overall record	AAC Record
Apr 1	at No. 16 East Carolina	Clark–LeClair Stadium • Greenville, NC	**W** 3–2^{10}	**Radue (1–2)**	Ingle (3–2)	**Russell (9)**	3,961	15–9	2–0
Apr 2	at No. 16 East Carolina	Clark–LeClair Stadium • Greenville, NC	**W** 5–1	**Feole (4–0)**	Agnos (1–1)	**Radue (1)**	2,711	16–9	3–0
Apr 5	Hartford*	J. O. Christian Field • Storrs, CT	**L** 4–6	Mormile (1–1)	**Wallace (0–1)**	DeVito (1)	188	16–10	
Apr 7	Memphis	J. O. Christian Field • Storrs, CT	**W** 6–2	**Cate (3–1)**	Hicks (4–2)	None	168	17–10	4–0
Apr 8	Memphis	J. O. Christian Field • Storrs, CT	**W** 10–7	**Dandeneau (2–0)**	Bowlan (3–4)	**Russell (10)**	250	18–10	5–0
Apr 9	Memphis	J. O. Christian Field • Storrs, CT	**W** 4–0	**Feole (5–0)**	Alexander (5–2)	None	500	19–10	6–0
Apr 11	at Bryant*	Conaty Park • Smithfield, RI	**L** 3–9	Morgese (3–4)	**Domnarski (1–4)**	Ipsen (2)	950	19–11	
Apr 13	at Tulane	Greer Field at Turchin Stadium • New Orleans, LA	**L** 3–8	Bjorngjeld (3–2)	**Cate (3–2)**	None	1,942	19–12	6–1
Apr 14	at Tulane	Greer Field at Turchin Stadium • New Orleans, LA	**L** 1–3	Merrill (5–2)	**Montgomerie (4–2)**	Colletti (4)	1,987	19–13	6–2
Apr 15	at Tulane	Greer Field at Turchin Stadium • New Orleans, LA	**L** 5–6^{12}	Solesky (2–2)	**Holmes (0–1)**	None	1,960	19–14	6–3
Apr 17	Quinnipiac*	J. O. Christian Field • Storrs, CT	**W** 4–3	**Nepiarsky (1–0)**	Workman (2–3)	None	190	20–14	
Apr 18	UMass*	J. O. Christian Field • Storrs, CT	**W** 11–3	**Poulin (1–0)**	Hassett (2–3)	None	175	21–14	
Apr 21	at UCF	Jay Bergman Field • Orlando, FL	**L** 8–1	Howell (6–0)	**Cate (3–3)**	None	1,295	21–15	6–4
Apr 22	at UCF	Jay Bergman Field • Orlando, FL	**W** 6–5	**Rajkowski (1–1)**	Bahr (0–1)	**Russell (11)**	1,200	22–15	7–4
Apr 23	at UCF	Jay Bergman Field • Orlando, FL	**L** 8–2	Sheridan (7–3)	**Feole (5–1)**	None	849	22–16	7–5
Apr 26	Rhode Island*	J. O. Christian Field • Storrs, CT	**L** 2–7	Grillo (3–0)	**Rossomando (2–2)**	None	127	22–17	
Apr 28	Cincinnati	J. O. Christian Field • Storrs, CT	**L** 4–5	Jarrett (1–0)	**Russell (1–1)**	Orndorff (5)	600	22–18	7–6
Apr 29	Cincinnati	J. O. Christian Field • Storrs, CT	**W** 6–4	**Feole (6–1)**	Kullman (5–5)	**Russell (12)**	800	23–18	8–6
Apr 30	Cincinnati	J. O. Christian Field • Storrs, CT	**W** 3–2	**Montgomerie (5–2)**	Zellner (2–4)	**Poulin (1)**	500	24–18	9–6

May
Date	Opponent	Site/stadium	Score	Win	Loss	Save	Attendance	Overall record	AAC Record
May 5	at No. 20 Houston	Schroeder Park • Houston, TX	**L** 5–6	Romero (4–4)	**Russell (1–2)**	None	1,386	24–19	9–7
May 6	at No. 20 Houston	Schroeder Park • Houston, TX	**L** 1–9	Cumbie (7–1)	**Feole (6–2)**	None	1,626	24–20	9–8
May 7	at No. 20 Houston	Schroeder Park • Houston, TX	**W** 7–4	**Radue (2–2)**	Romero (4–5)	None	1,750	25–20	10–8
May 9	Sacred Heart*	J. O. Christian Field • Storrs, CT	**W** 5–1	**Rossomando (3–2)**	Lonardelli (0–2)	None	189	26–20	
May 12	No. 23 South Florida	J. O. Christian Field • Storrs, CT	**W** 2–1	**Poulin (2–0)**	Cavallaro (4–2)	None	204	27–20	11–8
May 12	No. 23 South Florida	J. O. Christian Field • Storrs, CT	**W** 6–2	**Feole (7–2)**	McClanahan (4–2)	**Russell (13)**	211	28–20	12–8
May 13	No. 23 South Florida	J. O. Christian Field • Storrs, CT	**L** 0–2	Strzelecki (3–2)	**Montgomerie (5–3)**	None	196	28–21	12–9
May 15	Northeastern*	J. O. Christian Field • Storrs, CT	**L** 3–5	Rodriguez (4–3)	**Holmes (0–2)**	Fitzgerald (2)	101	28–22	
May 16	at Rhode Island*	Bill Beck Field • Kingston, RI	**W** 4–3	**Russell (2–2)**	Barss (0–3)	None	513	29–22	
May 18	East Carolina	J. O. Christian Field • Storrs, CT	**W** 6–0	**Cate (4–3)**	Wolfe (4–4)	None	2,828	30–22	13–9
May 19	East Carolina	J. O. Christian Field • Storrs, CT	**W** 6–4	**Montgomerie (6–3)**	Holba (4–2)	**Russell (14)**	415	31–22	14–9
May 20	East Carolina	J. O. Christian Field • Storrs, CT	**L** 0–3	Morgan (3–0)	**Feole (7–3)**	Bridges (2)	719	31–23	14–10

Postseason

AAC Tournament
Date	Opponent	Site/stadium	Score	Win	Loss	Save	TV	Attendance	Overall record	AACT Record
May 23	Cincinnati	Spectrum Field • Clearwater, FL	**W** 12–3	**Rajkowski (2–1)**	Perez (2–7)	**Nepiarsky (1)**	ADN	1,414	32–23	1–0
May 25	Houston	Spectrum Field • Clearwater, FL	**L** 6–7	Hurdsman (4–2)	**Radue (2–3)**	Fletcher (8)	ADN	1,385	32–24	1–1
May 26	Memphis	Spectrum Field • Clearwater, FL	**W** 7–5	**Russell (3–2)**	Bobo (0–2)	None	ADN	892	33–24	2–1
May 27	Houston	Spectrum Field • Clearwater, FL	**L** 3–13	Cumbie (10–1)	**Feole (7–4)**	None	ADN	914	33–25	2–2

Rankings from Collegiate Baseball. Parentheses indicate tournament rankings.

== 2018 ==
2018 Connecticut Huskies baseball

NCAA Conway Regional, 2–2
- Conference: American Athletic Conference
- Record: 37–22–1 (14–10 The American)
- Head coach: Jim Penders (15th season)
- Assistant coaches: Jeff Hourigan (7th season); Joshua McDonald (7th season); Chris Podeszwa (15th season)
- Home stadium: J.O. Christian Field

2018 American Athletic Conference baseball standings
	Conf.						Overall
Team	W		L		T	PCT	W		L		T	PCT
Houston ‍‍‍^{y}	16	–	8	–	0	.667	33	–	21	–	0	.611
South Florida ‍‍‍^{y}	14	–	9	–	1	.604	32	–	18	–	1	.637
Connecticut ‍‍‍^{y}	14	–	10	–	0	.583	37	–	22	–	1	.625
East Carolina ‍‍‡‍^{y}	14	–	10	–	0	.583	39	–	15	–	0	.722
UCF ‍‍‍	13	–	10	–	0	.565	35	–	19	–	0	.648
Cincinnati ‍‍‍	12	–	12	–	0	.500	28	–	26	–	0	.519
Wichita State ‍‍‍	9	–	14	–	1	.396	34	–	19	–	1	.639
Tulane ‍‍‍	9	–	14	–	0	.391	24	–	31	–	0	.436
Memphis ‍‍‍	5	–	19	–	0	.208	20	–	36	–	0	.357
‡ – Tournament champion y – Invited to the NCAA tournament As of May 20, 2018; Rankings from Collegiate Baseball

=== Personnel ===
==== Roster ====
2018 Connecticut Huskies roster
**Pitchers**: 10 – Colby Dunlop – Freshman; 12 – Joe Rivera – Senior; 15 – Jarrod Melle – Freshman; 18 – Jacob Wallace – Sophomore; 19 – P.J. Poulin – Junior; 21 – Mason Feole – Sophomore; 24 – Caleb Wurster – Freshman; 25 – Joe Simeone – Freshman; 34 – Randy Polonia – Junior; 36 – Tim Cate – Junior; 37 – Chase Gardner – Junior; 38 – Jeff Kersten – Junior; 39 – CJ Dandeneau – (redshirt) Junior; 40 – Angus Mayock – Freshman; 42 – Trevor Holmes – (redshirt) Senior; 43 – Ronnie Rossomando – Junior; 44 – Avery Santos – (redshirt) Junior; 45 – Dan Rajkowski – (redshirt) Junior; 52 – Karl Johnson – Freshman	**Catchers**: 4 – Kenny Bergmann – Sophomore; 9 – Paul Gozzo – Sophomore; 23 – Zac Susi – Junior; 30 – Thad Phillips – Junior; **Outfielders**: 3 – Troy Stefanski – Senior; 11 – Chris Winkel – Sophomore; 13 – Anthony Nucerino – Sophomore; 22 – Ben Maycock – (redshirt) Freshman; 26 – Isaac Feldstein – (redshirt) Senior; 27 – John Toppa – Junior; 32 – Nate Panzer – Sophomore	**Infielders**: 1 – Anthony Prato – Sophomore; 2 – Luke Broadhurst – Freshman; 5 – Matt Bonvicini – Freshman; 6 – Andy Hague – Freshman; 7 – Christian Fedko – Freshman; 8 – Michael Woodworth – Junior; 20 – Conor Moriarty – Sophomore; 31 – Vinnie Pallisco – Junior

==== Coaches ====
2018 Connecticut Huskies baseball coaching staff
- 16 – Jim Penders – Head coach – 15th season
- 29 – Jeff Hourigan – Assistant coach/recruiting coordinator – 7th season
- 33 – Joshua MacDonald – Assistant coach – 7th season
- 14 – Chris Podeszwa – Volunteer assistant coach – 15th season

=== Schedule ===
Legend
	UConn win
	UConn loss
	Cancellation
**Bold**	UConn team member
*	Non-Conference game

2018 Connecticut Huskies baseball game log
Regular season

February
Date	Opponent	Site/stadium	Score	Win	Loss	Save	Attendance	Overall record	AAC Record
Feb 16	at Kennesaw State*	Stillwell Baseball Stadium • Kennesaw, GA	**L** 3–7	Dupree (1–0)	**Cate (0–1)**	None	448	0–1	
Feb 17	at Georgia State*	GSU Baseball Complex • Atlanta, GA	**W** 10–1	**Feole (1–0)**	Rogers (0–1)	None	351	1–1	
Feb 18	at Georgia Tech*	Russ Chandler Stadium • Atlanta, GA	**W** 9–7^{10}	**Poulin (1–0)**	Datoc (0–1)	None	1,145	2–1	
Feb 23	at Southeastern Louisiana*	Pat Kenelly Diamond at Alumni Field • Hammond, LA	**L** 2–6	Green (2–0)	**Cate (0–2)**	None	1,296	2–2	
Feb 24	at Southeastern Louisiana*	Pat Kenelly Diamond at Alumni Field • Hammond, LA	**W** 7–6	**Dandeneau (1–0)**	Hileman (0–2)	**Poulin (1)**	1,243	3–2	
Feb 24	at Southeastern Louisiana*	Pat Kenelly Diamond at Alumni Field • Hammond, LA	**W** 6–4	**Gardner (1–0)**	Knopp (0–1)	**Poulin (2)**	1,360	4–2	

March
Date	Opponent	Site/stadium	Score	Win	Loss	Save	Attendance	Overall record	AAC Record
Mar 2	at North Florida*	Harmon Stadium • Jacksonville, FL	**W** 5–4	**Cate (1–2)**	Deppermann (0–1)	**Poulin (3)**	319	5–2	
Mar 3	at North Florida*	Harmon Stadium • Jacksonville, FL	**L** 5–6	Miller (1–1)	**Kersten (0–1)**	None	326	5–3	
Mar 4	at North Florida*	Harmon Stadium • Jacksonville, FL	**L** 2–4	Polansky (1–0)	**Dunlop (0–1)**	Norkus (1)	258	5–4	
Mar 7	Yale*	J. O. Christian Field • Storrs, CT	Postponed						
Mar 9	at The Citadel*	Joseph P. Riley Jr. Park • Charleston, SC	**L** 2–4	Buster (2–1)	**Cate (1–3)**	Sabo (2)	134	5–5	
Mar 10	at The Citadel*	Joseph P. Riley Jr. Park • Charleston, SC	**W** 17–3	**Feole (2–0)**	Merritt (1–1)	None	272	6–5	
Mar 11	at The Citadel*	Joseph P. Riley Jr. Park • Charleston, SC	**L** 2–4	Pillsbury (1–1)	**Holmes (0–1)**	Sabo (3)	229	6–6	
Mar 12	at The Citadel*	Joseph P. Riley Jr. Park • Charleston, SC	Cancelled						
Mar 13	at #30 Coastal Carolina*	Springs Brooks Stadium • Conway, SC	**W** 12–10	**Rossomando (1–0)**	Simonelli (3–1)	**Dandeneau (1)**	1,406	7–6	
Mar 16	at #29 St. John's*	Jack Kaiser Stadium • Jamaica, NY	**L**4–14	Mooney (4–1)	**Cate (1–4)**	None	174	7–7	
Mar 17	at #29 St. John's*	Jack Kaiser Stadium • Jamaica, NY	**W** 1–0	**Feole (3–0)**	Magee (1–2)	**Poulin (4)**	203	8–7	
Mar 18	at #29 St. John's*	Jack Kaiser Stadium • Jamaica, NY	**W** 3–1	**Rossomando (2–0)**	LoPresti (2–1)	**Poulin (5)**	296	9–7	
Mar 21	at Central Connecticut*	Balf–Savin Field • New Britain, CT	**W** 7–3^{10}	**Poulin (2–0)**	Morander (0–1)	None	115	10–7	
Mar 23	at South Florida	USF Baseball Stadium • Tampa, FL	**w** 6–4	**Cate (2–4)**	McClanahan (3–2)	**Poulin (6)**	1,158	11–7	1–0
Mar 24	at South Florida	USF Baseball Stadium • Tampa, FL	**L** 4–8	Strzelecki (4–1)	**Rossomando (2–1)**	None	823	11–8	1–1
Mar 25	at South Florida	USF Baseball Stadium • Tampa, FL	**L** 2–3	Perez (3–2)	**Poulin (2–1)**	None	1,322	11–9	1–2
Mar 27	at Boston College*	Brighton Field • Brighton, MA	**W** 4–0	**Kersten (1–1)**	Spagnuolo (0–2)	**Poulin (7)**	234	12–9	
Mar 29	Hartford*	J. O. Christian Field • Storrs, CT	**W** 9–1	Cate (3–4)'	DeVito (0–3)	None	221	13–9	
Mar 30	Central Connecticut*	J. O. Christian Field • Storrs, CT	**W** 6–1	**Feoloe (4–0)**	Fox (0–2)	None	289	14–9	
Mar 31	at Hartford	Dunkin' Donuts Park • Hartford, CT	**W** 1–0	**Gardner (2–0)**	Domkowski (1–4)	**Poulin (8)**	2,182	15–9	

April
Date	Opponent	Site/stadium	Score	Win	Loss	Save	Attendance	Overall record	AAC Record
Apr 7	UCF	J. O. Christian Field • Storrs, CT	**L** 8–10^{11}	Ward (4–2)	**Poulin (2–2)**	Tucker (4)	131	15–10	1–3
Apr 8	UCF	J. O. Christian Field • Storrs, CT	**W** 6–2	**Gardner (3–0)**	Montgomery (3–2)	**Poulin (9)**	151	16–10	2–3
Apr 8	UCF	J. O. Christian Field • Storrs, CT	**W** 7–6	**Poulin (3–2)**	Spicer (3–2)	None	231	17–10	3–3
Apr 10	Bryant*	J. O. Christian Field • Storrs, CT	**T** 9–9^{10}				285	17–10–1	
Apr 13	at No. 30 Wichita State	Eck Stadium • Wichita, KS	**W** 7–4	**Dunlop 1–1)**	Heuer (5–2)	None	2,990	18–10–1	4–3
Apr 13	at No. 30 Wichita State	Eck Stadium • Wichita, KS	**W** 9–4	**Feole (5–0)**	Eddy (6–2)	None	2,990	19–10–1	5–3
Apr 15	at No. 30 Wichita State	Eck Stadium • Wichita, KS	**L** 7–15	Killgore (3–1)	**Gardner (3–1)**	None	1,459	19–11–1	5–4
Apr 18	at UMass Lowell*	Edward A. LeLacheur Park • Lowell, MA	**W** 14–7	**Dunlop (2–1)**	Polichetti (0–1)	None	237	20–11–1	
Apr 20	at Cincinnati	Marge Schott Stadium • Cincinnati, OH	**L** 0–1	Perez (4–3)	**Feole (5–1)**	None	726	20–12–1	5–5
Apr 21	at Cincinnati	Marge Schott Stadium • Cincinnati, OH	**W** 7–6	**Wallace (1–0)**	Colvin (1–2)	None	652	21–12–1	6–5
Apr 22	at Cincinnati	Marge Schott Stadium • Cincinnati, OH	**W** 8–5	**Poulin (4–2)**	Colvin (1–3)	**Wallace (1)**	536	22–12–1	7–5
Apr 24	at Holy Cross*	Fitton Field • Worcester, MA	**W** 9–6	**Rajkowski (1–0)**	Johnson (0–1)	**Poulin (10)**	231	23–12–1	
Apr 27	Tulane	Dunkin' Donuts Park • Hartford, CT	**W** 6–2	**Feole (6–1)**	Roper (4–4)	**Poulin (11)**	2,078	24–12–1	8–5
Apr 28	Tulane	Dunkin' Donuts Park • Hartford, CT	**L** 1–7	Gillies (5–4)	**Gardner (3–2)**	None	2,543	24–13–1	8–6
Apr 29	Tulane	J. O. Christian Field • Storrs, CT	**W** 9–2	**Kerseten (2–1)**	Bates (2–1)	None	210	25–13–1	9–6

May
Date	Opponent	Site/stadium	Score	Win	Loss	Save	Attendance	Overall record	AAC Record
May 4	at Memphis	FedExPark • Memphis, TN	**W** 5–1	**Feole (7–1)**	Hicks (2–9)	**Wallace (2)**	402	26–13–1	10–6
May 5	at Memphis	FedExPark • Memphis, TN	**W** 2–0	**Kersten (3–1)**	Bowlan (2–7)	**Poulin (12)**	461	27–13–1	11–6
May 6	at Memphis	FedExPark • Memphis, TN	**L** 3–4	Smith (3–1)	**Rajkowski (1–1)**	Cabral (1)	411	27–14–1	11–7
May 8	Sacred Heart*	J. O. Christian Field • Storrs, CT	**W** 13–2	**Simeone (1–0)**	Sundahl (1–3)	None	332	28–14–1	
May 9	at Northeastern*	Parsons Field • Brookline, MA	**W** 6–5	**Kersten (4–1)**	Murphy (3–2)	**Poulin (13)**	265	29–14–1	
May 11	Houston	Dunkin' Donuts Park • Hartford, CT	**L** 5–6	Henry (5–1)	**Dandeneau (1–1)**	Pulido (4)	3,356	29–15–1	11–8
May 11	Houston	Dunkin' Donuts Park • Hartford, CT	**L** 1–10	Fletcher (6–2)	**Kersten (4–2)**	None	3,356	29–16–1	11–9
May 13	Houston	J. O. Christian Field • Storrs, CT	**W** 6–4	**Poulin (5–2)**	Pulido (4–2)	None	271	30–16–1	12–9
May 15	at Rhode Island*	Bill Beck Field • Kingston, RI	**L** 3–4	Silvestri (3–1)	**Rajkowski (1–2)**	N. Johnson (8)	233	30–17–1	
May 17	East Carolina	J. O. Christian Field • Storrs, CT	**W** 3–2	**Feole (8–1)**	Holba (9–1)	**Poulin (14)**	291	31–17–1	13–9
May 18	East Carolina	J. O. Christian Field • Storrs, CT	**L** 3–6	Burleson (5–1)	**Kersten (4–3)**	Ross (6)	450	31–18–1	13–10
May 19	East Carolina	J. O. Christian Field • Storrs, CT	**W** 4–2	**Gardner (4–2)**	Agnos (4–3)	**Poulin (15)**	419	32–18–1	14–10

Postseason

AAC Tournament
Date	Opponent	Site/stadium	Score	Win	Loss	Save	TV	Attendance	Overall record	AACT Record
May 23	Cincinnati	Spectrum Field • Clearwater, FL	**W** 6–2	**Feole (9–1)**	Alldred (5–3)	**Wallace (3)**	ADN	879	33–18–1	1–0
May 23	Wichita State	Spectrum Field • Clearwater, FL	**W** 7–4	**Cate (4–4)**	Tyler (4–1)	**Poulin (16)**	ADN	879	34–18–1	2–0
May 24	No. 24 South Florida	Spectrum Field • Clearwater, FL	**L** 0–13^{7}	Wiseley (3–0)	**Dunlop (2–2)**	None	ADN	804	34–19–1	2–1
May 25	South Florida	Spectrum Field • Clearwater, FL	**W** 3–2	**Poulin (3–2)**	Perez (5–3)	None	ADN	803	35–19–1	3–1
May 26	East Carolina	Spectrum Field • Clearwater, FL	**L** 3–4	Ross (3–4)	**Holmes (0–2)**	Kirkpatrick (3)	ADN	1,014	35–20–1	3–2

NCAA tournament: Conway Regional
Date	Rank	Opponent	Site/stadium	Score	Win	Loss	Save	TV	Attendance	Overall record	Regional Record
June 1	(2)	vs. (3) Washington*	Springs Brooks Stadium • Conway, SC	**L** 1–7	DeMers (7–3)	**Feole (9–2)**	None	ESPN3	1,971	35–21–1	0–1
June 2	(2)	vs. (4) LIU Brooklyn*	Springs Brooks Stadium • Conway, SC	**W** 10–3	**Cate (5–4)**	Pederson (6–5)	None	ESPN3	1,955	36–21–1	1–1
June 3	(2)	at (1) Coastal Carolina*	Springs Brooks Stadium • Conway, SC	**W** 6–5	**Dandeneau (2–1)**	Causey (2–2)	None	ESPN3	2,392	37–21–1	2–1
June 3	(2)	vs. (3) Washington*	Springs Brooks Stadium • Conway, SC	**L** 6–9	Emanuels (8–2)	**Dunlop (2–3)**	Hardy (8)	ESPN3	2,163	37–22–1	2–2

Rankings from Collegiate Baseball. Parentheses indicate tournament rankings.

== 2019 ==
2019 Connecticut Huskies baseball
- Conference: American Athletic Conference
- Record: 36–22 (12–12 The American)
- Head coach: Jim Penders (16th season)
- Assistant coaches: Jeff Hourigan (8th season); Joshua McDonald (8th season); Chris Podeszwa (16th season)
- Home stadium: J.O. Christian Field

2019 American Athletic Conference baseball standings
	Conf.				Overall
Team	W		L	PCT	W		L	PCT
No. 13 East Carolina ‍†‍‍^{y}	20	–	4	.833	47	–	18	.723
Cincinnati ‍‍‡‍^{y}	13	–	11	.542	31	–	31	.500
Tulane ‍‍‍	12	–	11	.522	32	–	26	.552
UConn ‍‍‍^{y}	12	–	12	.500	39	–	25	.609
Houston ‍‍‍	12	–	12	.500	32	–	24	.571
UCF ‍‍‍	11	–	13	.458	36	–	22	.621
Memphis ‍‍‍	10	–	13	.435	27	–	28	.491
Wichita State ‍‍‍	9	–	15	.375	28	–	31	.475
South Florida ‍‍‍	8	–	16	.333	26	–	27	.491
† – Conference champion ‡ – Tournament champion y – Invited to the NCAA tournament As of July 16, 2019; Rankings from D1Baseball

=== Personnel ===
==== Roster ====
2019 Connecticut Huskies roster
**Pitchers**: 10 - Colby Dunlop - Sophomore; 15 - Karl Johnson - (redshirt) Freshman; 18 - Jake Wallace - Junior; 21 - Mason Feole - Junior; 23 - Tyler Briggs - Freshman; 24 - Caleb Wurster - (redshirt) Freshman; 25 - Joe Simeone - Sophomore; 26 - Tim Pfaffenbichler - Freshman; 31 - Jimmy Wang - (redshirt) Freshman; 34 - Randy Polonia - (redshirt) Junior; 37 - Chase Gardner - Senior; 38 - Jeff Kersten - Senior; 39 - CJ Dandeneau - (redshirt) Senior; 40 - Angus Mayock - (redshirt) Freshman; 42 - Jake Sanderson - Freshman; 44 - Avery Santos - (redshirt) Senior; 45 - Kenny Haus - Junior; - Leif Bigelow - Freshman	**Catchers**: 2 - Cole Brodnansky - Junior; 9 - Paul Gozzo - Junior; 30 - Thad Phillips - Senior; 43 - Pat Winkel - Freshman; **Outfielders**: 4 - Michael Chiovitti - Junior; 13 - Anthony Nucerino - (redshirt) Sophomore; 22 - Ben Maycock - (redshirt) Sophomore; 27 - John Toppa - Senior; 36 - Adam Schwartz - Freshman; - Ryan Bagdasarian - Junior; - Kevin Ferrer - Freshman	**Infielders**: 1 - Anthony Prato - Junior; 3 - Kyler Fedko - Freshman; 6 - Andy Hague - Sophomore; 7 - Christian Fedko - Sophomore; 8 - Michael Woodworth - Infielder; 11 - Chris Winkel - Junior; 19 - Will Lucas - Freshman; 20 - Conor Moriarty - Junior; 41 - David Langer - Junior; - Matt Bonvicini - Sophomore

==== Coaches ====
2019 Connecticut Huskies baseball coaching staff
- 16 – Jim Penders – Head coach – 16th season
- 29 – Jeff Hourigan – Assistant coach/recruiting coordinator – 8th season
- 33 – Joshua MacDonald – Assistant coach – 8th season
- 14 – Chris Podeszwa – Volunteer assistant coach – 16th season

=== Schedule ===
Legend
	UConn win
	UConn loss
	Cancellation
**Bold**	UConn team member
*	Non-Conference game

2019 Connecticut Huskies baseball game log
Regular season

February
Date	Opponent	Rank	Site/stadium	Score	Win	Loss	Save	Attendance	Overall record	AAC Record
Feb 15	vs No. 4 Louisville*		Joker Marchant Stadium • Lakeland, FL	**W** 3–2	**Gardner (1–0)**	Elliott (0–1)	**Wallace (1)**	247	1–0	
Feb 16	vs No. 4 Louisville*		Joker Marchant Stadium • Lakeland, FL	**L** 2–12	Bennett (1–0)	**Dunlop (0–1)**	None	457	1–1	
Feb 17	vs No. 4 Louisville*		Joker Marchant Stadium • Lakeland, FL	**W** 8–3	**Santos (1–0)**	Hoeing (0–1)	**Wallace (2)**	368	2–1	
Feb 22	at College of Charleston*		CofC Baseball Stadium • Mount Pleasant, SC	**W** 7–4	**Kersten (1–0)**	McLarty (1–1)	**Wallace (3)**	561	3–1	
Feb 23	at College of Charleston*		CofC Baseball Stadium • Mount Pleasant, SC	**L** 2–7	Price (2–0)	**Dunlop (0–2)**	None	725	3–2	
Feb 24	at College of Charleston*		CofC Baseball Stadium • Mount Pleasant, SC	**L** 6–7	Cook (2–0)	**Gardner (1–1)**	Ocker (1)	596	3–3	

March
Date	Opponent	Rank	Site/stadium	Score	Win	Loss	Save	Attendance	Overall record	AAC Record
Mar 1	vs Northeastern*		Springs Brooks Stadium • Conway, SC	**W** 7–4	**Kersten (2–0)**	Stiehl (1–2)	**Dandeneau (1)**	173	4–3	
Mar 2	vs Indiana*		Springs Brooks Stadium • Conway, SC	**L** 6–9	Sloan (1–0)	**Santos (1–1)**	None	275	4–4	
Mar 2	at Coastal Carolina*		Springs Brooks Stadium • Conway, SC	**L** 7–10	Eardesohn (2–0)	Wang (0–1)	None	1,657	4–5	
Mar 3	vs No. 25 Illinois*		Springs Brooks Stadium • Conway, SC	**W** 7–4	**Dandeneau (1–0)**	Leland (1–1)	**Wallace (4)**	164	5–5	
Mar 8	at Texas State*		Bobcat Ballpark • San Marcos, TX	**W** 8–4	**Wurster (1–0)**	Fraze (2–2)	None	1,572	6–5	
Mar 9	at Texas State*		Bobcat Ballpark • San Marcos, TX	**W** 4–1	**Wallace (1–0)**	Leigh (0–1)	**Johnson (1)**	1,478	7–5	
Mar 10	at Texas State*		Bobcat Ballpark • San Marcos, TX	**L** 3–5	Reich (2–0)	**Simeone (0–1)**	Theriot (1)	1,217	7–6	
Mar 15	vs Michigan State*		Fluor Field at the West End • Greenville, SC	**W** 10–6	**Dandeneau (2–0)**	Erla (1–3)	**Wallace (5)**	369	8–6	
Mar 16	vs Michigan State*		Fluor Field at the West End • Greenville, SC	**W** 17–4	**Kersten (3–0)**	Mokma (1–2)	None		9–6	
Mar 16	vs Michigan State*		Fluor Field at the West End • Greenville, SC	**W** 9–3	**Haus (1–0)**	Olson (0–2)	None	482	10–6	
Mar 17	vs Michigan State*		Fluor Field at the West End • Greenville, SC	**W** 6–1	**Dunlop (1–2)**	Tyranski (0–3)	None	1,317	11–6	
Mar 20	at Virginia*		Davenport Field • Charlottesville, VA	**L** 3–6	Kosanovich (3–0)	**Dandeneau (2–1)**	Whitten (2)	2,693	11–7	
Mar 22	at Houston		Schroeder Park • Houston, TX	**W** 2–1	**Feole (1–0)**	Lockhart (1–3)	**Wallace (6)**	1,231	12–7	1–0
Mar 23	at Houston		Schroeder Park • Houston, TX	**L** 4–5	Bond (1–0)	**Kersten (3–1)**	Villareal (3)	1,324	12–8	1–1
Mar 24	at Houston		Schroeder Park • Houston, TX	**W** 9–3	**Dunlop (2–2)**	Roedahl (3–2)	None	1,287	13–8	2–1
Mar 26	Hartford*		J. O. Christian Field • Storrs, CT	**W** 12–4	**Haus (2–0)**	Plourde (0–2)	None	259	14–8	
Mar 27	Boston College*		J. O. Christian Field • Storrs, CT	**W** 3–1	**Dunlop (3–2)**	Mancini (2–3)	**Wallace (7)**	311	15–8	
Mar 29	at UCF		Jay Bergman Field • Orlando, FL	**L** 1–2	Schuerman (2–3)	**Feole (1–1)**	None	1,489	15–9	2–2
Mar 30	at UCF		Jay Bergman Field • Orlando, FL	**W** 3–1	**Wallace (2–0)**	Westberg (2–3)	None	1,151	16–9	3–2
Mar 31	at UCF		Jay Bergman Field • Orlando, FL	**W** 10–0	**Wang (1–1)**	Whitehead (2–1)	None	1,281	17–9	4–2

April
Date	Opponent	Rank	Site/stadium	Score	Win	Loss	Save	Attendance	Overall record	AAC Record
Apr 2	Fairfield*		J. O. Christian Field • Storrs, CT	**L** 3–10	Arnold (1–1)	**Haus (2–1)**	Oliphant (1)	279	17–10	
Apr 3	UMass Lowell*		J. O. Christian Field • Storrs, CT	**W** 9–4	**Dunlop (4–2)**	Aronson (0–1)	None	353	18–10	
Apr 5	Cincinnati		J. O. Christian Field • Storrs, CT	**L** 4–5	Kullman (1–5)	**Feole (1–2)**	None	317	18–11	4–3
Apr 6	Cincinnati		Dunkin' Donuts Park • Hartford, CT	**W** 5–1	**Wurster (2–0)**	Shawver (1–4)	None	2,156	19–11	5–3
Apr 7	Cincinnati		Dunkin' Donuts Park • Hartford, CT	**L** 4–10	Murray (2–0)	**Dunlop (4–3)**	None	1,891	19–12	5–4
Apr 9	at Bryant*		Conaty Park • Smithfield, RI	**W** 11–6	**Johnson (1–0)**	Lacey (2–1)	None	150	20–12	
Apr 10	Northeastern*		J. O. Christian Field • Storrs, CT	**W** 6–2	**Polonia (1–0)**	Dufault (1–1)	None	297	21–12	
Apr 12	Memphis		J. O. Christian Field • Storrs, CT	**W** 3–1	**Dandeneau (3–1)**	Smith (3–4)	**Wallace (8)**	239	22–12	6–4
Apr 13	Memphis		J. O. Christian Field • Storrs, CT	**L** 1–7	Hicks (3–2)	**Kersten (3–2)**	None	511	22–13	6–5
Apr 14	Memphis		J. O. Christian Field • Storrs, CT	**W** 4–2	**Dandeneau (4–1)**	Kelly (1–3)	None	612	23–13	7–5
Apr 16	at UMass*		Earl Lorden Field • Amherst, MA	**W** 10–7	**Simeone (1–1)**	Clevinger (1–2)	**Wurster (1)**	118	24–13	
Apr 18	at East Carolina		Clark–LeClair Stadium • Greenville, NC	**L** 1–5	Agnos (5–2)	**Feole (1–3)**	None	3,024	24–14	7–6
Apr 19	at East Carolina		Clark–LeClair Stadium • Greenville, NC	**L** 2–5	Benton (4–0)	**Wang (1–2)**	Voliva (3)		24–15	7–7
Apr 20	at East Carolina		Clark–LeClair Stadium • Greenville, NC	**L** 7–9	Smith (5–0)	**Kersten (3–3)**	None	3,655	24–16	7–8
Apr 24	Rhode Island*		J. O. Christian Field • Storrs, CT	**W** 2–1	**Johnson (2–0)**	Jangols (1–4)	**Wallace (9)**	282	25–16	
Apr 26	at Sam Houston State*		Don Sanders Stadium • Huntsville, TX	**L** 5–8	Wesnecki (7–1)	**Johnson (2–1)**	Miholajchak (6)	906	25–17	
Apr 27	at Sam Houston State*		Don Sanders Stadium • Huntsville, TX	**W** 9–4	**Kersten (4–3)**	Wesnecki (0–1)	None	975	26–17	
Apr 28	at Sam Houston State*		Don Sanders Stadium • Huntsville, TX	**L** 5–6	Miholajchak (4–3)	**Wallace (3–1)**	None	957	26–18	
Apr 30	Central Connecticut*		J. O. Christian Field • Storrs, CT	**W** 9–1	**Mayock (1–0)**	Delease (2–2)	None	151	27–18	

May
Date	Opponent	Rank	Site/stadium	Score	Win	Loss	Save	Attendance	Overall record	AAC Record
May 3	Wichita State		Dunkin' Donuts Park • Hartford, CT	**W** 4–0	**Feole (2–3)**	Eddy (5–5)	**Wallace (10)**	2,120	28–18	8–8
May 4	Wichita State		Dunkin' Donuts Park • Hartford, CT	**W** 2–1	**Kersten (5–3)**	McGinniss (4–4)	**Wallace (11)**	1,971	29–18	9–8
May 4	Wichita State		Dunkin' Donuts Park • Hartford, CT	**L** 5–12	Peters (1–1)	**Dunlop (4–4)**	None	1,917	29–19	9–9
May 10	South Florida		J. O. Christian Field • Storrs, CT	**W** 4–2	**Wurster (3–0)**	Burns (3–3)	**Wallace (12)**	217	30–19	10–9
May 11	South Florida		J. O. Christian Field • Storrs, CT	**L** 2–3	Schrepf (1–0)	**Wurster (3–1)**	Alvarez (8)	311	30–20	10–10
May 11	South Florida		J. O. Christian Field • Storrs, CT	**L** 1–3	Wisely (3–4)	**Maycock (1–1)**	Burns (1)	311	30–21	10–11
May 14	at Rhode Island*		Bill Beck Field • Kingston, RI	**W** 5–4	**Wang (2–2)**	Morrison (1–3)	**Wallace (13)**	125	31–21	
May 16	at Tulane		Greer Field at Turchin Stadium • New Orleans, LA	**W** 8–5	**Feole (3–3)**	Gillies (2–4)	**Wallace (14)**	1,605	32–21	11–11
May 17	at Tulane		Greer Field at Turchin Stadium • New Orleans, LA	**W** 10–6	**Dunlop (5–4)**	Raj (3–2)	None	1,497	33–21	12–11
May 18	at Tulane		Greer Field at Turchin Stadium • New Orleans, LA	**L** 6–8	Solesky (6–3)	**Polonia (1–1)**	None	2,242	33–22	12–12

Postseason

AAC Tournament
Date	Opponent	Rank	Site/stadium	Score	Win	Loss	Save	TV	Attendance	Overall record	AACT Record
May 21	(5) Houston	(4)	Spectrum Field • Clearwater, FL	**W** 4–3	**Wallace (3–1)**	Villarreal (5–4)	None	ADN	1,801	34–22	1–0
May 23	(8) Wichita State	(4)	Spectrum Field • Clearwater, FL	**W** 9–7	**Wurster (4–1)**	Segal (1–2)	**Wallace (15)**	ADN	1,042	35–22	2–0
May 25	(8) Wichita State	(4)	Spectrum Field • Clearwater, FL	**W** 8–3	**Dunlop (6–4)**	Peters (1–3)	None	ADN	1,022	36–22	3–0
May 26	(2) Cincinnati	(4)	Spectrum Field • Clearwater, FL	**L** 5–22	Schoenle (4–1)	**Kersten (5–4)**	None	ESPNews	822	36–23	3–1

NCAA tournament: Oklahoma City Regional
Date	Rank	Opponent	Site/stadium	Score	Win	Loss	Save	TV	Attendance	Overall record	Regional Record
May 31	(2)	vs. (3) Nebraska*	Chickasaw Bricktown Ballpark • Oklahoma City, OK	**L** 5–8	Palkert (6–3)	**Feole (3–4)**	Gomes (13)	ESPN3	2,406	36–24	0–1
Jun 1	(2)	vs. (4) Harvard*	Chickasaw Bricktown Ballpark • Oklahoma City, OK	**W** 10–2	**Simeone (2–1)**	Miller (3–4)	None	ESPN3	2,043	37–24	1–1
Jun 2	(2)	vs. (3) Nebraska*	Chickasaw Bricktown Ballpark • Oklahoma City, OK	**W** 16–1	**Dunlop (7–4)**	Eddins (6–4)	None	ESPN3	2,005	38–24	2–1
Jun 2	(2)	vs. (1) Oklahoma State*	Chickasaw Bricktown Ballpark • Oklahoma City, OK	**W** 5–2	**Wurster (5–1)**	Standlee (3–2)	**Wallace (16)**	ESPN3	4,296	39–24	3–1
Jun 3	(2)	vs. (1) Oklahoma State*	Chickasaw Bricktown Ballpark • Oklahoma City, OK	**L** 1–3	Lienhard (4–1)	**Dandeneau (4–2)**	Battenfield (5)	ESPNU	2,937	39–25	3–2

Rankings from D1Baseball. Parentheses indicate tournament seedings.

=== Rankings ===
Ranking movements Legend: ██ Increase in ranking ██ Decrease in ranking — = Not ranked
	Week																		
Poll	Pre	1	2	3	4	5	6	7	8	9	10	11	12	13	14	15	16	17	Final
ESPN/USA Today Coaches Poll	—	—	—	—	—	—	—	—	—	—	—	—	—	—	—				
Baseball America	—	—	—	—	—	—	—	22	—	—	—	—	—	—	—				
Collegiate Baseball	32	27	—	—	—	—	—	—	—	—	—	—	—	—	—				
NCBWA	35	—	—	—	—	—	—	30	—	—	—	—	—	—	—				
D1Baseball	—	—	—	—	—	—	—	22	—	—	—	—	—	—	—				
