= Alström =

Alström is a Swedish surname. Notable people with the surname include:

- Ed Alstrom (born 1958), stadium organist
- Carl-Henry Alström (1907–1993), Swedish psychiatrist
  - Alström syndrome
- Per Alström (born 1961), Swedish ornithologist
- Sara Alström (born 1975), Swedish actress
- Victor Alström (born 1986), Swedish ice hockey player

== See also ==
- Alstom
