= Paul Cartier =

American stadium organist

Paul Cartier (born January 4, 1959) is the stadium organist for Major League Baseball's New York Yankees and the National Hockey League's New York Islanders.

When he plays for the Yankees, Cartier plays 15-20 minutes every game night before the game starts. He finishes off every half-inning with organ music as well as Happy Birthday promotions and "Take Me Out to the Ballgame" for the seventh inning stretch. He also plays music when the Yankees are at bat, chosen either by himself or in consultation with the music director. His organ booth with his Hammond Elegante, is currently in the Delta Club where fans sometimes visit him between sets. In the old Yankee Stadium, it was directly above and behind home plate, next to the booth used by announcer Bob Sheppard.

Cartier played for the Islanders at Nassau Coliseum for the first time in 1979 and became their regular organist in 1980 through 1985. He had been a fan since he saw their first game in 1972, often playing their theme song from his window before playing street hockey with his friends. He returned as a fill-in organist in 2000, and replaced Eddie Layton as the full-timer a few years later. Since 2015, he's been playing for them at Barclays Center in Brooklyn. As of April 2022, Cartier is still with the Islanders at UBS Arena with a new organ, the Lowrey Prestige organ, and can be seen in section 201a.

== Early life and education ==
Cartier's first organ was a Magnus chord organ that belonged to his aunt. His parents later got his own Estee chord organ, and he started taking piano lessons. He began playing at his local church as an eleven year old.

Cartier graduated from Hofstra University in 1981 with a BS in music education. He played organ in church to help pay for college and has been the organist at Our Lady of Hope Church in Diocese of Rockville Centre since 1987. He is also a substitute organist at various other area Catholic churches. In his day job he was an air traffic controller until 2015, and also works for his local volunteer fire department as a Firefighter/EMT. He lives in South Hempstead, New York.
