= Jack Russell Memorial Stadium =

Baseball stadium in Clearwater, Florida, U.S.

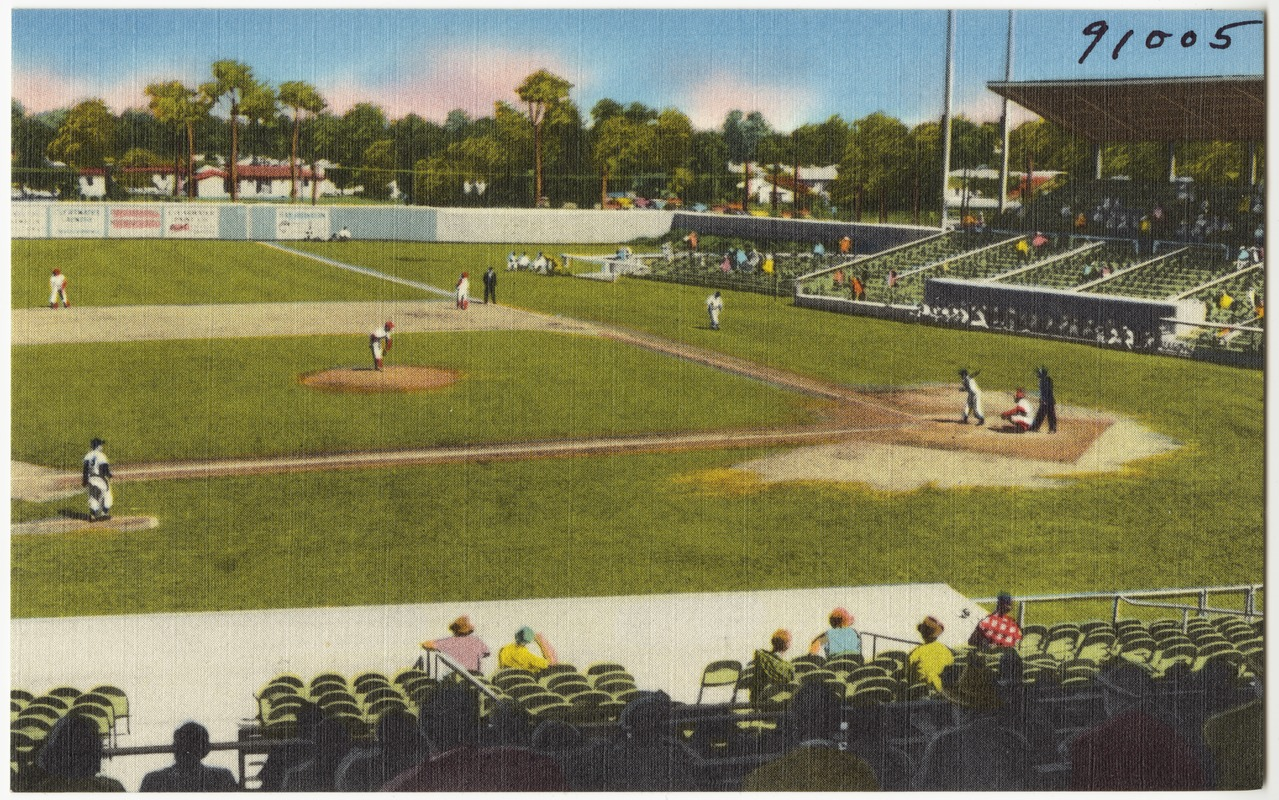
- Jack Russell Stadium in 1950s
- Interactive map of Jack Russell Memorial Stadium
- Former names: Jack Russell Stadium (1955–1990)
- Location: 800 Phillies Drive, Clearwater, Florida 33755, United States
- Coordinates: 27°58′28″N 82°47′21″W
- Owner: City of Clearwater
- Capacity: 4,744 (1955); 4,808 (1967); 5,368 (1985); 6,942 (2003); 1,200 (2018)
- Surface: grass
- Field size: Left – 340 ft. Center – 400 ft. Right – 340 ft.

Construction
- Groundbreaking: 1954
- Opened: March 10, 1955
- Renovated: July 21, 2007
- Cost: $317,653
- Architects: Marr and Holliman (Nashville, Tennessee)
- General contractor: Clearwater Construction Company

Tenants
- Philadelphia Phillies (MLB) (spring training) (1955–2003); Clearwater Bombers (ASA) (1955–1984); Clearwater Phillies (FSL) (1985–2003); St. Petersburg College (NJCAA) (2017-present); Clearwater High School (2017-present); Dunedin Blue Jays (FSL) (2019)

Jack Russell Memorial Stadium is a baseball field in Clearwater, Florida. It opened as Jack Russell Stadium in 1955. It was the spring training home of the Philadelphia Phillies Major League Baseball team from 1955 through 2003. Since 2017, it has been home to the Clearwater High School and St. Petersburg College baseball teams.

The Clearwater Bombers, a softball team that won 10 National Amateur Softball Association titles between 1950 and 1973, played their home games there from 1955 through 1984. The name of the stadium was changed to Jack Russell Memorial Stadium following Jack Russell's death in November 1990.

In 2004, the Philadelphia Phillies moved to Bright House Networks Field, 4 miles to the east. Most of the ballpark was demolished on July 21, 2007. The dugouts, offices, and other elements were retained as the field has continued to be used for amateur baseball.

== Phillies Spring Training (1954-2003) ==
Jack Russell played in the Major Leagues from 1926 through 1940. He was introduced to Pinellas County while training in the area as a member of the Cleveland Indians. Russell settled in Clearwater after his career where he became a Union Oil Co. distributor and Clearwater Chamber of Commerce president. The Phillies had moved their spring training camp to Clearwater for the 1947 season and played at Clearwater Athletic Field. Russell became a Clearwater city commissioner, a position he held from 1951 to 1955, and was a vocal advocate for a new ballpark for the Phillies in Clearwater.

Russell was instrumental in the conception of the new ballpark; he had blueprints and plans drawn up himself, and then approached the Clearwater mayor and city commission with the plans in July 1954. With their approval, Russell then obtained the legal rights from the Florida state supreme court in Tallahassee to fund the stadium's construction through revenue bonds. In 1954, the Clearwater city council approved the building of the new ballpark and work began in fall 1954.

The stadium was dedicated on March 10, 1955.

Baseball Commissioner Ford Frick, National League president Warren Giles, American League president Will Harridge, Clearwater mayor Herbert M. Brown, and other city dignitaries were in attendance. Clearwater Mayor Brown surprised Russell, and announced that the stadium would be named in his honor.

The Phillies played the first game following the dedication. Robin Roberts started for the Phillies against the Detroit Tigers. The Phillies won 4-2 on a two-run double by Willie Jones before 4,209 fans.

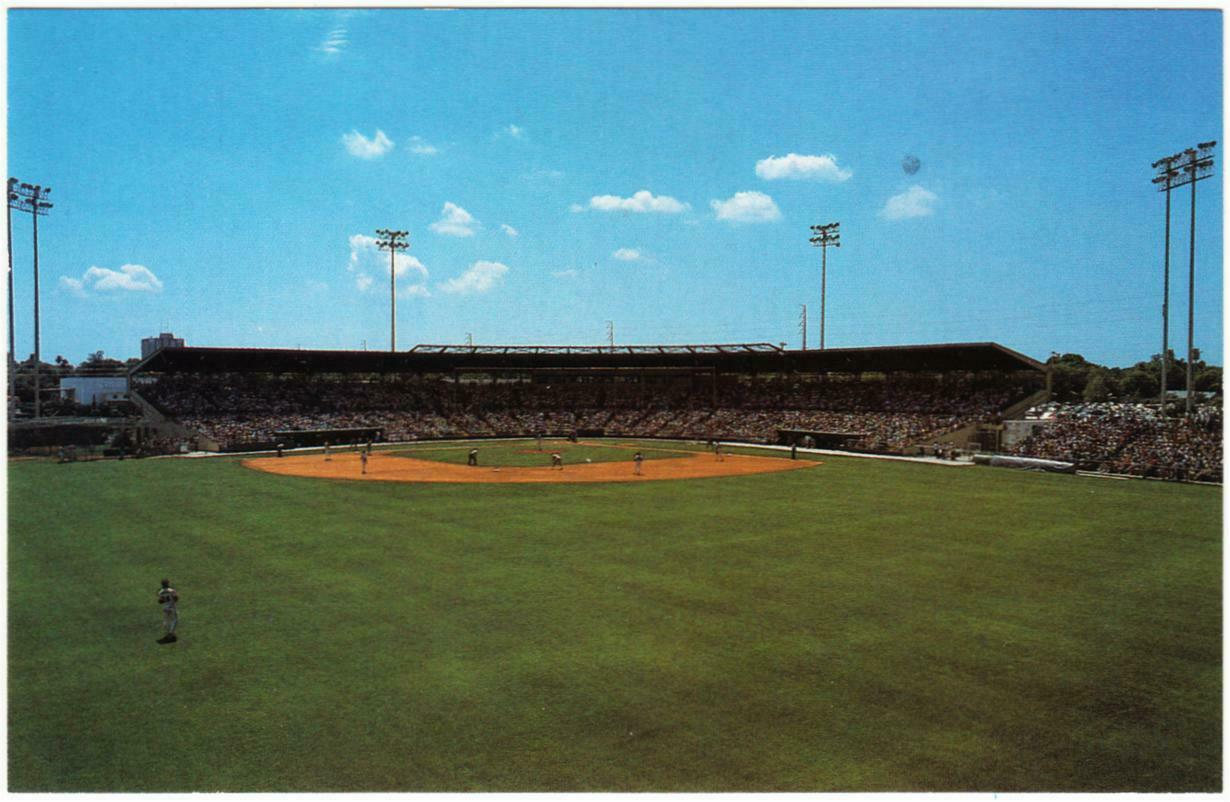
Jack Russell Stadium in early-1970s.

The Florida Winter Instructional Rookie League was a post season minor league in October and November; the Baltimore Orioles' team played their home games at Jack Russell in 1959 and the Kansas City A's played at the ballpark in 1960. The Orioles and Yankees shared the ballpark in 1970 and 1971.

Lights were added to the stadium in 1965. The Phillies played their first night game in Clearwater on March 23, 1965, beating the St. Louis Cardinals before 2,937 fans.

The Tokyo Giants trained with the Los Angeles Dodgers in Vero Beach in 1971. The Phillies played the Giants at Jack Russell on March 15, 1971, the team's first game against a Japanese team.

The 1987 HBO movie Long Gone filmed many of the movie's road games at Jack Russell Stadium in November 1986.

Following the 1989 season, the City of Clearwater spent $800,000 to increase seating from 5,111 to 7,194 by constructing additional bleachers along the left field and the right field lines. The City also constructed additional restrooms and concessions. In exchange, the Phillies signed a new lease through the 2002 season.

In its final spring training in 2003, parking cost $3 and game tickets cost $8, $6, and $5.

The Phillies played their final spring training game at the ballpark on March 28, 2003 against the New York Yankees. Robin Roberts threw out the ceremonial first pitch, the sell out attendance was 7,224, and the Yankees beat the Phillies 2–0.

== Clearwater Phillies (1985-2003) ==
Clearwater city officials first approached the Philadelphia Phillies as early as 1981 about placing a full season Phillies minor league affiliate at Jack Russell Stadium in Clearwater. In a visit to Philadelphia in July 1982, Clearwater city officials and the president of the Florida State League invited the Philadelphia Phillies to affiliate with an FSL franchise in Clearwater.

While the Phillies played their spring training schedule at the stadium every March, the Amateur Softball Association Clearwater Bombers had used Jack Russell Stadium during the summer months when the field would be reconfigured for softball since the stadium's opening in 1955. The placement of a minor league baseball team would force the relocation of the Bombers.

The Florida State League granted Clearwater a franchise in September 1984 over the protests of the Bombers and their local supporters. A new playing field was built for the Bombers adjacent to the Phillies Carpenter Complex.

For the Clearwater Phillies' first-season in the Florida State League in 1985, a new home clubhouse and additional seating were added to the ballpark. The Clearwater Phillies played their first regular season game at Jack Russell on April 12, 1985 against the Tampa Tarpons.

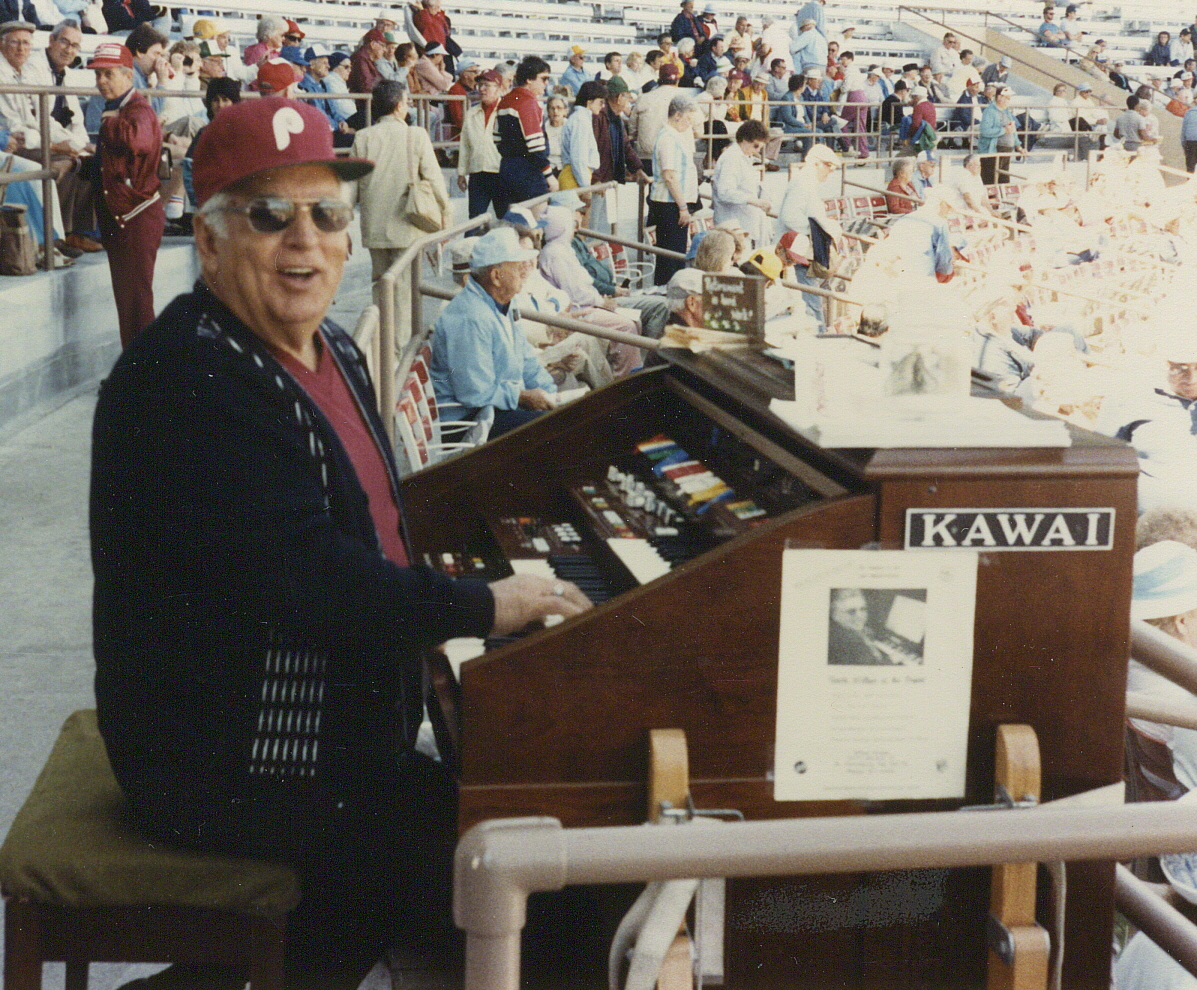
Wilbur Snapp, Jack Russell Stadium organist, in 1985

Wilbur Snapp served as the stadium organist from 1982 through 1996. Snapp had run a music store in Springfield, Ohio then retired to Florida in 1978. He played his organ for both spring training and Florida State League games. Snapp received national attention following his ejection from an FSL ballgame in 1985. On June 25, 1985 during a Clearwater Phillies game against the Osceola Astros, an umpire called a close-out against Clearwater. Snapp agreed with the boos of the crowd and began playing "Three Blind Mice." The umpire ejected Snapp, the first time an organist was ejected by an umpire during a game. Willard Scott mentioned it on NBC's Today show, and Paul Harvey talked about it on his syndicated radio program. Clearwater replaced Snapp with recorded music in 1997 though it was reported he still continued to attend home games at the Stadium.

Jack Russell Stadium was the site of a double no-hitter on August 23, 1992 when the Clearwater Phillies' Andy Carter no-hit the Winter Haven Red Sox whose Scott Bakkum no-hit the Phillies. Cleawater won 1-0 on two seventh inning walked batters and sacrifice bunts. In a spring training game on April 2, 1993, the Boston Red Sox' Frank Viola and Cory Bailey no-hit the Phillies 10-0 at Jack Russell.

The Clearwater Phillies played their last game at the stadium on Saturday night, August 23, 2003. Robin Roberts, who had pitched the first exhibition game in 1955, threw out the first-pitch. 6,472 fans, the second-largest crowd in Clearwater Phillies history, saw the Phillies lose 6-2 to the Sarasota Red Sox.

== Non-baseball uses ==
The ballpark was listed in 1957 as having a seating capacity of 6,500 for concerts.

The Rolling Stones played Jack Russell Stadium on May 6, 1965 during their 22-show 3rd American Tour. That night, Keith Richards found the guitar riff for (I Can't Get No) Satisfaction in his sleep, when he briefly woke up in his room at the Fort Harrison Hotel in Clearwater, recorded the riff and the phrase "I can't get no satisfaction", and went back to sleep.

The boy band 'N Sync was from Orlando and played a concert at Jack Russell in 1996.

On January 14, 2000, Tampa's Michael "Gold" Rush claimed the vacant National Boxing Association's cruiserweight belt with a technical knockout of Pedro Riveron at 1 minute, 34 seconds into the seventh round in front of 1,500 spectators.

== Jack Russell Stadium (2004-present) ==
The Clearwater City Council voted on June 7, 2007 to partially raze the stadium and JVS Contracting Inc of Tampa demolished much of the stadium that summer. Left were the playing field, dugouts, bleachers, batting cages, and original two-story office in the right field corner.

The Winning Inning Baseball Academy, a Christian-based athletic organization, leased the ballpark from the City of Clearwater in 2007. The organization paid rent, utilities, and maintained the field, and while the City of Clearwater paid for structural repairs.

The Winning Inning and City of Clearwater hosted the Clearwater College Invitational in March 2008 at the reconfigured ballpark.

The St. Petersburg/Clearwater Sports Commission hosted a Big East/Big Ten Baseball Challenge in February 2009 that brought Big Ten and Big East teams to play a tournament in the area. Jack Russell Stadium was one of five local ballparks hosting Challenge games.

In 2017 and 2018, the City of Clearwater invested $500,000 and partnered with the Clearwater High School Batter Up Booster Club, the Phillies, Toronto Blue Jays, Tampa Bay Rays, Clearwater for Youth, the Pinellas County School District, Clearwater High School and St. Petersburg College to add an additional clubhouse, a second set of batting cages, seating for 1,200, and installed turf, formerly used in Tropicana Field from 2011 to 2016 by the Tampa Bay Rays, on the training field.

On March 23, 2018, the City of Clearwater and the Phillies dedicated a memorial park at the ballpark to honor the Phillies Hall of Famers, Jack Russell, visiting greats, and World Champion 1980 Phillies team who played there.

During renovations to Dunedin Stadium in 2019, the Dunedin Blue Jays used the ballpark as a temporary home field, playing most of their 70 scheduled home games at the park. Attendance in 2019 was 11,757 over 58 games, an average of 203 spectators per-game.
