= Wilbur Snapp =

American organist (1920–2003)

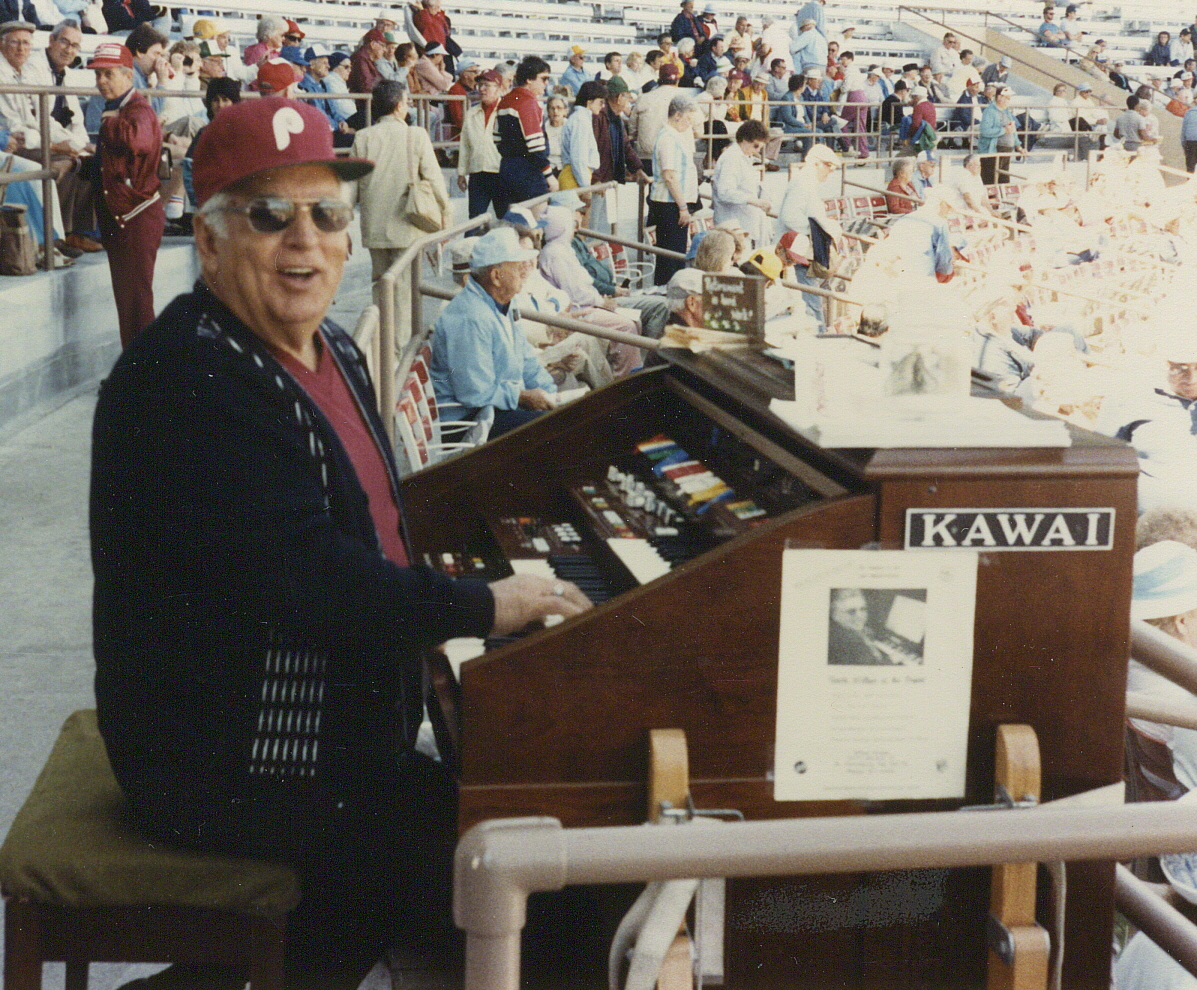
- Snapp in 1985 at Jack Russell Memorial Stadium
- Born: August 5, 1920; Champaign County, Ohio, US
- Died: September 6, 2003 (aged 83); South Pasadena, Florida, US
- Occupation: Stadium organist

Wilbur Snapp (August 5, 1920 – September 6, 2003) was a self-taught American musician who was the stadium organist for the Clearwater Phillies, a minor-league baseball team, and for the Philadelphia Phillies in spring training, over a period of 20 years.

Snapp served in the Army Air Forces in World War II; he married his wife Janice in 1942. Despite being unable to read sheet music, Snapp taught himself to play the organ at age 35; upon his retirement from operating a music store in Ohio, he moved to Florida and became a ballpark organist for the Clearwater Phillies.

On June 26, 1985 he was ejected from a game at the Jack Russell Stadium for playing "Three Blind Mice" in response to what he thought was a bad call from the umpire, Kevin O'Connor. The umpire pointed up to Snapp, who was sitting at his organ behind first base, then thumbed him out of the game.
