= TD Place =

TD Place is a sports facility in Ottawa, Ontario, Canada which includes:

- TD Place Arena, an indoor arena
- TD Place Stadium, an outdoor stadium

== See also ==
- TD Arena in Charleston, South Carolina
- TD Ballpark in Dunedin, Florida
- TD Garden in Boston, Massachusetts
- TD Stadium in London, Ontario
