= Eddie Layton =

American organist (1925–2004)

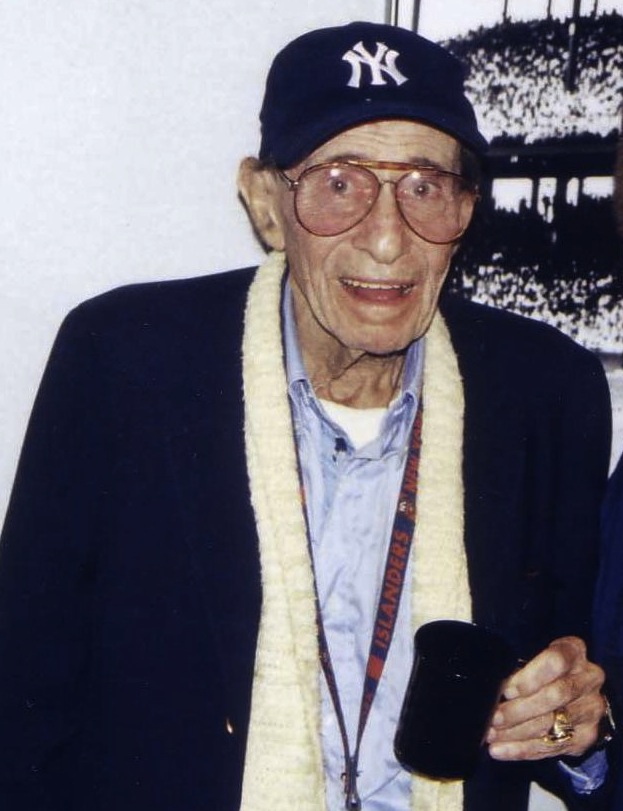
- Layton at his retirement party in 2003
- Born: Edward M. Layton; October 10, 1925; Philadelphia, Pennsylvania, U.S.
- Died: December 26, 2004 (aged 79); Forest Hills, Queens, New York, U.S.
- Occupation: Stadium organist

Edward M. Layton (October 10, 1925 – December 26, 2004) was an American stadium organist who played at old Yankee Stadium for nearly 40 years, earning him membership in the New York Sports Hall of Fame.

== Early life and education ==
Layton was born in Philadelphia. He graduated from West Chester State Teachers College, now West Chester University, where he majored in meteorology with a minor in music. He began playing the organ when he was 12 years old.

While serving in the United States Navy during World War II, he learned to play the Hammond organ. After World War II, he began a career as a professional organist writing scores for soap operas on CBS,"The Secret Storm," "Love is a Many Splendored Thing," "Love of Life," and "Where the Heart Is." He recorded 27 albums of organ music, and travelled the world as a spokesperson and artist for Hammond Organ company.

== Career ==
=== Professional sports organist ===
Layton joined the New York Yankees franchise in 1967 when CBS purchased the Yankees from Dan Topping. Because of pressure from the success of the New York Mets, their new Shea Stadium facility and the popularity of their organist, Jane Jarvis, Topping had installed an organ in Yankee Stadium at the beginning of the 1965 season. Lowrey organ demonstrator Toby Wright was the first Yankee organist and did the 1965 and 1966 seasons. Team president E. Michael Burke brought Layton in to play organ music at the stadium in 1967.

At the time, he had never been to the stadium and knew nothing about baseball. He went on to play the organ for the Yankees for over three decades, taking a break from 1971 to 1977 to pursue other musical commitments. (Wright had returned as organist during that time.) When he retired on September 28, 2003, he played a final performance of "Take Me Out to the Ball Game", while fans chanted "Eddie! Eddie!". Current New York Yankees organists Ed Alstrom and Paul Cartier were recruited by Layton to take his place at Yankee Stadium.

In addition to playing for the Yankees, Layton was the organist for the New York Knicks and the New York Rangers from 1967 to 1985. He also played for several seasons of New York Islanders games in the 1990s and served one stint as organist for the indoor New York Cosmos soccer team at Madison Square Garden.

=== Concerts and albums ===
Layton also performed concerts in more than 200 cities for the Hammond Organ Company and released 27 albums. In addition, Layton played the organ at Radio City Music Hall for thirty years of Pace University commencements held there. The student union at Pace University's New York City campus was named in his honor.

=== Hobbies ===
Layton loved sailing and owned his own tugboat. He also owned a huge collection of model trains he maintained at his Forest Hills, New York home. He loved demonstrating organs to the public, and giving organ lessons. In 2009, Soapluvva established a YouTube tribute channel to both Layton and Charles Paul, who were colleagues of each other at the CBS Broadcast Center in Manhattan.

== Death ==
On December 26, 2004, Layton died of natural causes at his home in Forest Hills, New York, at age 79, following a brief illness. He was buried at Mount Hebron Cemetery in Queens, New York City, with his feet pointed away from Shea Stadium.

== Controversy ==
Layton claimed credit as the first to come up with the idea of playing charge calls at a baseball game in 1971. However, Michael Silverbush claims to have made the innovation eight years prior.

In Ken Burns' 1994 documentary Baseball, in a sequence on New York Mets fans in the film's eighth installment, Silverbush can be seen briefly playing a trumpet at Shea Stadium in 1969.
