= Stadium organist =

Musician who plays an organ during live sporting events

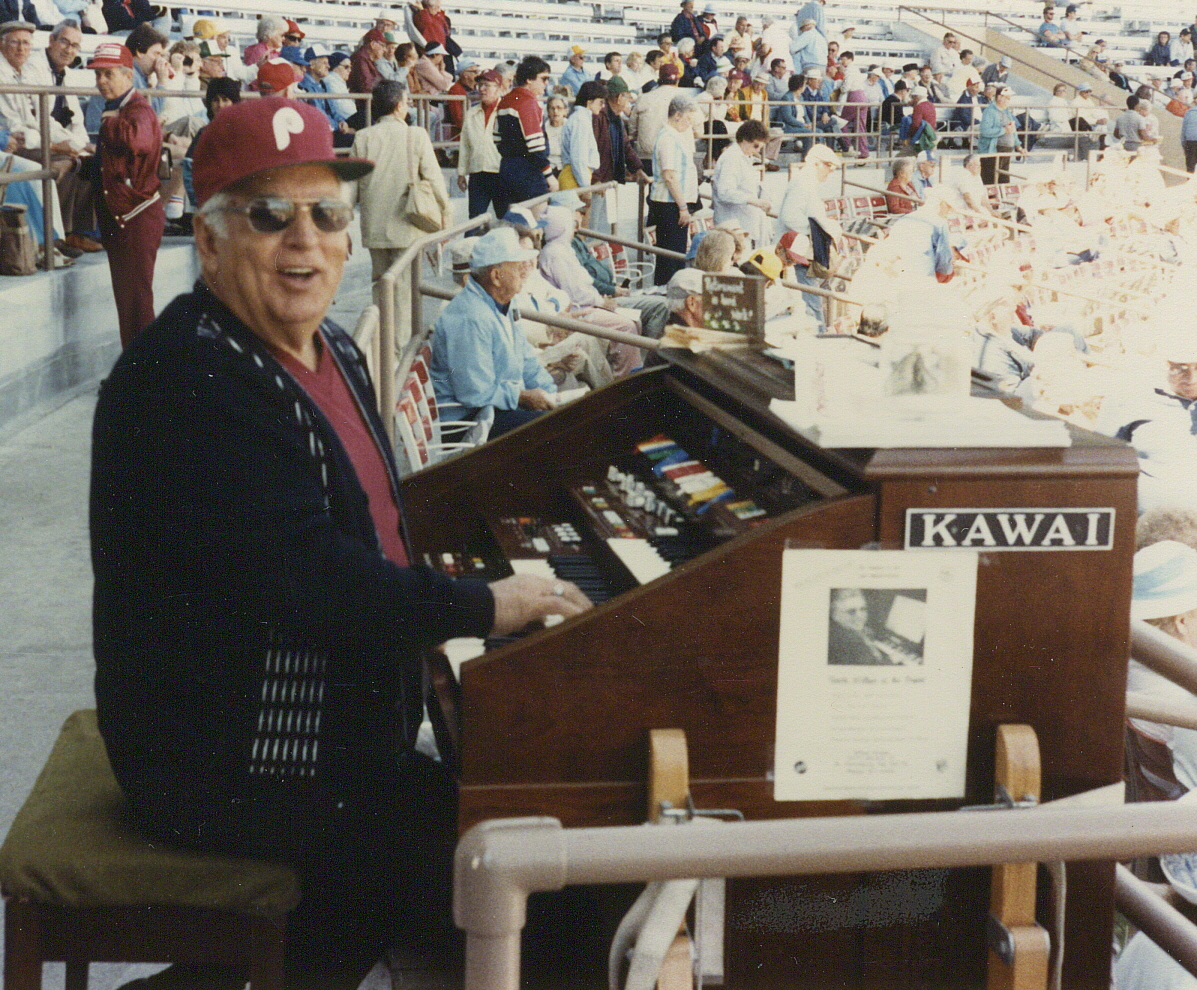
Wilbur Snapp playing the organ at Jack Russell Stadium, Clearwater, Florida, 1985

A stadium organist is a musician who plays an organ during live sporting events.

== Organs at sporting events ==
During the early part of the 20th century, organs were often found in public locations such as movie theaters, eating establishments, and shopping malls. Before then, they had customarily only been found in churches. Music played at sporting events, if there was any, would occasionally be provided by military bands.

The first organ used in a stadium in the United States was in Chicago Stadium, which opened in 1929. The organ music was used for what was called "psychological accompaniment" for events at the stadium, especially hockey matches. Other stadiums that featured hockey games began getting their own organs including Madison Square Garden in 1936, and the Boston Garden in 1939.

In 1934, Hammond created their first fully electric organ. These could be connected to public address systems which had been used in baseball stadiums since 1929. Wrigley Field debuted their organ on April 26, 1941, played by Roy Nelson. However, his performance had to be wrapped up before the broadcast of the baseball game began because of copyright concerns; the organ was removed from Wrigley Field after two games and did not reappear until 1967.

== Professional organ players ==
Ebbets Field installed an organ for the 1942 season, and Gladys Goodding, an organ player for silent films as well as some sporting events at Madison Square Garden, was the first professional baseball organist. She continued to play at Dodgers games until the team moved to Los Angeles in 1957. The New York Times described her role as "adjusting her music to the flitting, evanescent temper of the Dodger fan, of consoling, of stirring to added effort, of soothing the public and of protecting the umpire against rebellion."

Another early stadium organist, John Kiley, got his start playing for silent films at the Criterion Theater in Roxbury at the age of 15. He went on to play for the Red Sox, the Boston Bruins, and the Boston Celtics. Unlike Goodding, Kiley primarily played before the game and during breaks, often opting for nostalgic music and avoiding more modern rock music, a method also shared by Eddie Layton who played for the New York Yankees. Kiley's day job was working for local radio station WMEX, where he was the music director from 1934 to 1956.

Many stadium organists who started in the 1950s and 1960s were more likely to come from television and radio backgrounds such as Jane Jarvis, a jazz pianist and organist, who worked as the organist for the Milwaukee Braves beginning in 1955.

There are no age requirements for being a stadium organist and sometimes the job has been held by teenagers, including Donna Parker, in 1972, Dieter Ruehle in 1983, Carolyn King in 1988, and Hudson DiTomaso in 2021.

In some stadiums such as Petco Park and the KeyBank Center, the organist is placed in a public area where spectators can talk to them; in others, such as TD Garden, the organist is six stories above the stands and communicates with the public primarily over social media.

== Stadium repertoire ==
While each organist has their own style and particular specialties, some aspects of the work are fairly consistent from musician to musician.

- National anthem
- Walk-on music – often chosen by a player or their family
- Charges – short musical pieces that foreshadow something happening in the game
- Clappers – music or melodies that get fans excited
- 7th-Inning Stretch – music played between halves of the seventh inning in baseball, often "Take Me Out to the Ball Game" or other team traditions
- Musical puns – music where the lyrics or title of the song being played are a commentary on the action or person on the field. This can occasionally backfire; in 1985, organist Wilbur Snapp played "Three Blind Mice" after a controversial call by an umpire and was ejected from the game. This also happened to intern organist Derek Dye in 2012.

== Decline and revival ==
By 2005 the tradition of live organists playing in stadiums was waning after longtime organists retired and were replaced with pre-recorded music. Many claim the popularity of video scoreboards, which began being used in the 1980s, was employed instead to capture fans' interest. Games with live organists began to be called "throwback" days.

However, the tradition has been making a comeback. The Detroit Red Wings brought back a live organist in 2009 after not having one since the mid-1980s. Tabitha Barattini was hired to the Miami Marlins in 2014. Barratini is a classically trained pianist who was advised by a professor to also learn the organ because there were more employment opportunities. Dustin Tatro began working as an organist for the Texas Rangers in 2020 after they had not had a live organist since 2001.

Many college sports teams now use live organ music—either directly played through an organ or a portable keyboard with organ function—to entertain fans before and after the game, and during lulls in game play such as during pitching changes.

Stadium organists are considered part of the sports team's "family" and when the team wins a championship, many organists such as Josh Kantor, Ron Poster, and Eddie Layton have been given championship rings.

== See also ==
- Nancy Faust
