= ALMS1 =

Protein

Identifiers
- Aliases: ALMS1, ALSS, centrosome and basal body associated protein, ALMS1 centrosome and basal body associated protein
- External IDs: OMIM: 606844; MGI: 1934606; HomoloGene: 49406; GeneCards: ALMS1; OMA:ALMS1 - orthologs

Gene location (Human)
Chr.	Chromosome 2 (human)
Band	2p13.1	Start	73,385,758 bp
Band	2p13.1	End	73,625,166 bp

Gene location (Mouse)
Chr.	Chromosome 6 (mouse)
Band	6|6 C3	Start	85,564,513 bp
Band	6|6 C3	End	85,679,735 bp
RNA expression pattern
Bgee	Human / Mouse (ortholog); Top expressed in: buccal mucosa cell; periodontal fiber; cardia; renal medulla; ventral tegmental area; pylorus; inferior ganglion of vagus nerve; subthalamic nucleus; nipple; superior surface of tongue / Top expressed in: spermatid; primary oocyte; spermatocyte; secondary oocyte; tail of embryo; zygote; genital tubercle; testicle; epiblast; uterus; More reference expression data
BioGPS	n/a
Gene ontology
Molecular function	protein binding; alpha-actinin binding; molecular function
Cellular component	microtubule organizing center; centriole; cytosol; centrosome; cell projection; spindle pole; cilium; cytoskeleton; cytoplasm
Biological process	endosomal transport; G2/M transition of mitotic cell cycle; regulation of stress fiber assembly; ciliary basal body-plasma membrane docking; regulation of G2/M transition of mitotic cell cycle; regulation of centriole replication; positive regulation of cold-induced thermogenesis
Sources:Amigo / QuickGO
Orthologs
Species	Human	Mouse
Entrez	7840	236266
Ensembl	ENSG00000116127	ENSMUSG00000063810
UniProt	Q8TCU4	Q8K4E0
RefSeq (mRNA)	NM_015120; NM_001378454	NM_145223
RefSeq (protein)	NP_055935	NP_660258
Location (UCSC)	Chr 2: 73.39 – 73.63 Mb	Chr 6: 85.56 – 85.68 Mb
PubMed search
- Wikidata
View/Edit Human	View/Edit Mouse

ALMS1 is a protein which in humans is encoded by the ALMS1 gene, which is located on chromosome 2 (region 2p13.1). This gene helps with the organization of microtubules and the formation and maintenance of cilia. Autosomal recessive variants in this gene cause Alstrom Syndrome.

== Discovery ==
The Jackson Laboratory in Bar Harbor, Maine, USA with the University of Southampton, UK identified ALMS1 as the single gene responsible for Alström syndrome.

== Gene ==
The ALMS1 gene is located on the short arm of chromosome 2 (2p13.2) on the plus (Watson) strand. It is 224,161 bases in length organized into 23 exons. The encoded protein has 4,167 amino acids and molecular weight of 460,937 Da. Three isoforms are known. Mutations associated with disease are usually found in exons 8, 10 and 16.

== Tissue and subcellular distribution ==
The gene is expressed in fetal tissues including the aorta, brain, eye, kidney, liver, lung, olfactory bulb, pancreas, skeletal muscle, spleen and testis. The protein is found in the cytoplasm, centrosome, cell projections and cilium basal body. During mitosis it localizes to both spindle poles.

== Structure ==
The ALMS1 protein is relatively large and consists of 4,169 amino acids.

The ALMS1 protein contains the following domains:

- Tandem repeat domain (TRD)
- Leucine-zipper motif
- 130 residues at the C-terminus (ALMS motif)

== Function ==
The function of the ALMS1 protein is largely unknown, but it is known to be located on centrosomes and the base of cilia. The location of the protein within cells suggests that it may be involved in both the function of cilia and how materials are transported. Researchers believe that the protein may be involved in body weight management, blood glucose levels, hearing, vision, the heart, kidneys, lungs, and liver.

== Clinical significance ==
Variants in the ALMS1 gene have been found to be causative for Alström syndrome with a total of 268 disease-causing mutations as of 2020. These include both nonsense and frameshift mutations (insertions and deletions) that can create nonfunctional proteins. Most of the mutations have been found in exons 8,10 and 16.

Knockdown of Alms1 by short interfering RNA in mouse inner medullary collecting duct cells caused defective ciliogenesis. Cilia were stunted and treated cells lacked the ability to increase calcium influx in response to mechanical stimuli.

=== Organ systems ===
Primary cilia are hair-like projections that are on the surface of many cell types. ALMS1 is localized to the basal body of cilia and will help regulate signaling pathways all over the body. When there is a mutation in the ALMS1, the primary cilia will become dysfunctional. This will affect many pathways in the body due to this mutation. The Endocrine system is affected by a mutation in ALMS1 by having symptoms of early-onset obesity, insulin resistance, and type 2 diabetes. When looking at the cardiovascular system there is a symptom of dilated cardiomyopathy, which can lead to heart failure. In the sensory system, there is a disease called cone-rod dystrophy that takes place because of ALMS1 which can cause loss of hearing and vision. With the renal system, the mutation can cause progressive kidney dysfunction which can lead to end-stage renal disease. Lastly, the hepatic system can be affected by fatty liver disease. The mutation will cause different kinds of reactions in the organ systems.

=== Kidney damage ===
ALMS1 has a very critical role in maintaining renal function and blood pressure homeostasis. It is hypothesized that a mutation in ALMS1 in macula densa cells will amplify tubuloglomerular feedback (TGF) and cause some problems in the kidneys due to an overreaction to sodium changes. The TGF mechanism will then reduce the glomerular filtration rate (GFR). This can lead to hypertension and progressive kidney damage. All tests were done on ALMS1 knockout rats, and the outcome was higher glomerular capillary pressure and increased arterial blood pressure. Blood flow dynamics were also affected by these changes.
