= Ryan Casteel =

American baseball player (born 1991)

- Catcher / First baseman
- Born: June 6, 1991 (age 34); Chattanooga, Tennessee, U.S.
- Bats: Right Throws: Right
- Stats at Baseball Reference

Ryan Alexander Casteel (born June 6, 1991) is an American former professional baseball catcher who spent his professional career in the Atlanta Braves, Colorado Rockies, and Seattle Mariners organizations. He is currently the manager for the Dunedin Blue Jays.

== Amateur career ==
Casteel attended Bradley Central High School in Cleveland, Tennessee. After graduating, he went unselected in the 2009 Major League Baseball (MLB) Draft under the belief he would attend the University of Tennessee. Though he had previously accepted a scholarship to attend the University of Tennessee and play college baseball for the Tennessee Volunteers on a scholarship, Casteel rejected the scholarship, and enrolled at Cleveland State Community College, also in Cleveland. This way, Casteel would be eligible for the MLB Draft earlier.

== Professional career ==
=== Colorado Rockies ===
The Colorado Rockies selected Casteel in the 17th round, with the 530th overall selection, of the 2010 Major League Baseball draft. He began his professional career with the Casper Ghosts of the Rookie-level Pioneer League, and had a .305 batting average. The next year, he had a .273 batting average alongside 1 home run, 30 RBI, and 8 stolen bases in 56 games for the Tri-City Dust Devils of the Low–A Northwest League. In 2012, he played in 71 games for the Asheville Tourists of the Single–A South Atlantic League, and batted .279/.332/.414 with 2 home runs and 28 RBI.

In 2013, he played for the Modesto Nuts of the High–A California League. He was named a midseason All-Star and the California League's Catcher of the Year after hitting .270/.352/.523 with career–highs in home runs (22) and RBI (76) in 108 games. He then played for the Melbourne Aces of the Australian Baseball League (ABL) for the 2013–14 ABL season. Casteel played in the 2013 Australian Baseball League All-Star Game and won the Helms Award as the ABL's Most Valuable Player.

In 2014, Casteel played for the Tulsa Drillers of the Double–A Texas League, where he was named an All-Star. In 113 games, he hit .280/.341/.445 with 16 home runs and 56 RBI. After the year, the Rockies assigned Casteel to the Salt River Rafters of the Arizona Fall League. Casteel spent the majority of the 2015 season with the Albuquerque Isotopes of the Triple–A Pacific Coast League, missing a chunk of the year with a quadriceps injury. Playing in 42 games split between Albuquerque, the Double–A New Britain Rock Cats, and the Low–A Boise Hawks, he accumulated a .306/.313/.425 batting line with 2 home runs and 22 RBI.

The Rockies invited Casteel to major league spring training in 2016. After going 2–for–24 (.083) with 8 strikeouts, he was assigned to Triple–A Albuquerque to begin the season. In 43 games for the Isotopes, he slashed .230/.273/.368 with 3 home runs and 20 RBI. On July 4, 2016, Casteel was released by the Rockies organization.

=== Seattle Mariners ===
On July 7, 2016, Casteel signed a minor league contract with the Seattle Mariners organization. He spent the remainder of the year with the Double–A Jackson Generals, hitting .243/.306/.351 with 3 home runs and 28 RBI across 50 contests. Casteel elected free agency following the season on November 7.

On December 16, 2016, Casteel re–signed with the Mariners on a new minor league contract. He spent the 2017 season with the Double–A Arkansas Travelers, playing in 100 games and hitting .272/.323/.429 with 12 home runs and 61 RBI. Casteel elected free agency following the season on November 6, 2017.

=== Lancaster Barnstormers ===
On February 7, 2018, Casteel signed with the Lancaster Barnstormers of the Atlantic League of Professional Baseball He played in 104 games for Lancaster, batting .321/.383/.523 with 16 home runs and 70 RBI. Casteel was named an All–Star for the team, and was also named the Barnstormers Player of the Year for the season. He became a free agent following the 2018 season.

=== Atlanta Braves ===
On January 25, 2019, Casteel signed a minor league contract with the Atlanta Braves organization. He played in 118 games for the Double–A Mississippi Braves, batting .263/.334/.477 with 21 home runs and 73 RBI. Casteel did not play in a game in 2020 due to the cancellation of the minor league season because of the COVID-19 pandemic. He became a free agent on November 2, 2020.

On March 14, 2021, Casteel re-signed with the Braves organization on a minor league contract. He was assigned to the Braves' Triple–A affiliate, the Gwinnett Stripers, for whom he played in 68 games and hit .224/.299/.417 with 8 home runs and 28 RBI. He elected free agency following the season on November 7. On November 29, he again re–signed with Atlanta on a minor league deal. Casteel played in 69 games for Gwinnett in 2022, batting .217/.303/.481 with 17 home runs and 47 RBI.

On November 1, 2022, Casteel again re–signed with the Braves on a new minor league contract. He played in only one game for Triple–A Gwinnett in 2023. In 2024, Casteel made 14 appearances, hitting .213/.245/.362 with two home runs and six RBI. On July 19, 2024, it was announced that Casteel had retired. He was placed on the Voluntarily Retired List by the Gwinnett Stripers.

== Coaching career ==
=== Atlanta Braves ===
Following his retirement, Casteel was hired as a coach for the Atlanta Braves' Triple-A affiliate, the Gwinnett Stripers, for the 2024 season.

On February 11, 2025, Casteel was named as a coach for the Florida Complex League Braves, Atlanta's rookie-level affiliate.

=== Toronto Blue Jays ===
On February 13, 2026, Casteel was hired by the Toronto Blue Jays to serve as the manager for the Dunedin Blue Jays, Toronto's Single-A affiliate.

== Personal life ==
Casteel is married to his wife Bethany.
