= Dunedin Blue Jays =

- Founded in 1987; Dunedin, Florida

Team logo	Cap insignia

Minor league affiliations
- Class: Single-A (2021–present)
- Previous classes: Class A-Advanced (1990–2020); Class A (1987–1989)
- League: Florida State League (1987–present)
- Division: West Division

Major league affiliations
- Team: Toronto Blue Jays (1978–1979; 1987–present)

Minor league titles
- League titles (1): 2017
- Division titles (6): 1999; 2000; 2003; 2006; 2017; 2022
- First-half titles (9): 1990; 2000; 2004; 2006; 2010; 2012; 2013; 2014; 2019
- Second-half titles (8): 1992; 1999; 2003; 2008; 2011; 2016; 2019; 2022

Team data
- Name: Dunedin Blue Jays (1978–1979; 1987–present)
- Colors: Blue, white, navy, red
- Mascot: DJay
- Ballpark: TD Ballpark (2020–present)
- Previous parks: Jack Russell Memorial Stadium (2019); TD Ballpark (1990–2018); Grant Field (1978–1979, 1987–1989)
- Owner/ Operator: Toronto Blue Jays
- Manager: Ryan Casteel
- Website: milb.com/dunedin

The Dunedin Blue Jays are a Minor League Baseball team of the Florida State League and are the Single-A affiliate of the Toronto Blue Jays Major League Baseball club. They are located in Dunedin, Florida, and play their home games at TD Ballpark, which opened in 1990 and seats 8,500 people.

Two teams named the Blue Jays, both affiliates of Toronto, have played in Dunedin: the original incarnation, from 1978 to 1979, and the current team, established in 1987. Since their inception they have won six division championships, in 1999, 2000, 2003, 2006, 2017, and 2022. In 2017 they were named co-champions of the FSL.

== History ==
The original incarnation of the Dunedin Blue Jays was founded in 1978. They were established as the Class A affiliate of the new Toronto Blue Jays franchise. They played for two seasons in the Florida State League and were one of four Class A teams in Toronto's farm system. After the 1979 season the team was disbanded as Toronto expanded its farm system into higher classifications.

Local interests were unable to sign a deal with other major league teams to keep minor league baseball in Dunedin; however Toronto continued to hold its spring training in the city. In 1987, Toronto decided to establish a new Florida State League franchise in Dunedin. They originally played at Grant Field until 1990, when Dunedin Stadium was completed.

When Major League Baseball owners considered locking out the regular players and using "scabs" instead for the 1995 season, Dunedin would have been used as the Toronto Blue Jays' home field due to Ontario laws concerning replacement workers. The MLB labor dispute was resolved before the plan was implemented, however.

In 2006, the Blue Jays made it to the Florida State League Championship Series, losing to the St. Lucie Mets 3 games to 0.

In 2007, the Dunedin Blue Jays were nominated for the 2007 Corporate Support Award, which is awarded annually by the Florida Recreation & Park Association, to an organization that goes above and beyond to support and fund recreational programming.

On September 6, 2017, Dunedin won their first Florida State League championship by defeating the Tampa Yankees two games to one. Dunedin shared the FSL championship with the Palm Beach Cardinals, as the impending threat from Hurricane Irma forced the cancellation of the championship series.

For the 2019 season, the team played at Jack Russell Memorial Stadium while TD Ballpark underwent renovations.

As a result of the COVID-19 pandemic, the 2020 Minor League Baseball season was initially postponed before being cancelled on June 30 of that year. Due to the pandemic causing restrictions on travel between the United States and Canada, there were plans of the Toronto Blue Jays relocating to Dunedin for the 2020 MLB season. Ultimately the team decided to play the majority of their home games at the stadium of their Triple-A affiliate in Buffalo, New York.

In December 2020, as part of Major League Baseball's reorganization of Minor League Baseball, the Dunedin Blue Jays were chosen to remain an affiliate of the Toronto Blue Jays. However, along with the other remaining teams of the Florida State League, the team changed classes from A-Advanced to Low-A and were placed in a league called the Low-A Southeast. In 2022, the Low-A Southeast became known as the Florida State League, the name historically used by the regional circuit prior to the 2021 reorganization, and was reclassified as a Single-A circuit.

== Season-by-season ==
These statistics are current through the 2025 season.

=== Full season (1978–1979, 1987) ===
Year	League	Division	Regular season					Postseason
Year	League	Division	Finish	Wins	Losses	Win%	GB	Postseason
1978	FSL	West	5th	59	83	.415	26	
1979	FSL	West	3rd	68	69	.496	11	
1987	FSL	West	2nd	76	64	.543	8	

=== Split season (1988–present) ===
League champions †	Finals appearance *	Division winner ^	Wild card berth ¤

Year	Class	League	Division	Regular season										Postseason
Year	Class	League	Division	1st half					2nd half					Postseason
Year	Class	League	Division	Finish	Wins	Losses	Win%	GB	Finish	Wins	Losses	Win%	GB	Postseason
1988	A	FSL	West	5th	32	38	.457	3	4th	33	37	.471	8	
1989	A	FSL	West	5th	33	37	.471	7	3rd	36	34	.514	6.5	
1990	High-A	FSL	West	1st ^	53	14	.791	—	3rd	31	38	.449	9.5	Lost quarterfinals (Charlotte) 0–2
1991	High-A	FSL	West	5th	29	36	.446	13	3rd	30	36	.455	9.5	
1992	High-A	FSL	West	4th	36	34	.514	14.5	1st ^	42	25	.627	—	Lost quarterfinals (Clearwater) 0–2
1993	High-A	FSL	West	5th	34	33	.507	9.5	4th	34	31	.523	9.5	
1994	High-A	FSL	West	6th	33	35	.485	11.5	5th	32	33	.492	9.5	
1995	High-A	FSL	West	4th	35	33	.515	5	8th	28	41	.406	16.5	
1996	High-A	FSL	West	3rd	40	29	.580	3.5	8th	27	41	.397	16	
1997	High-A	FSL	West	6th	32	38	.457	11	8th	25	44	.362	18.5	
1998	High-A	FSL	West	2nd	43	27	.614	3.5	4th	39	31	.557	7.5	
1999	High-A	FSL	West	2nd	45	24	.652	1	1st ^	41	27	.603	—	Won semifinals (Clearwater) 2–1; Lost finals (Kissimmee) 1–3 *
2000	High-A	FSL	West	1st ^	40	29	.580	—	2nd	44	25	.638	0.5	Won semifinals (Fort Myers) 2–0; Lost finals (Daytona) 0–3 *
2001	High-A	FSL	West	2nd	33	34	.493	1.5	2nd	38	30	.559	8	
2002	High-A	FSL	West	5th	33	38	.465	9.5	4th	30	34	.469	13	
2003	High-A	FSL	West	4th	38	32	.543	6	1st ^	40	30	.571	—	Won semifinals (Tampa) 2–1; Lost finals (St. Lucie) 1–3 *
2004	High-A	FSL	West	1st ^	41	29	.586	—	2nd	35	28	.556	2	Lost semifinals (Tampa) 0–2
2005	High-A	FSL	West	2nd	41	29	.586	5.5	2nd ¤	41	29	.586	1	Lost semifinals (Lakeland) 0–2
2006	High-A	FSL	West	1st ^	38	32	.543	—	6th	30	37	.448	10.5	Won semifinals (Fort Myers) 2–1; Lost finals (St. Lucie) 0–3 *
2007	High-A	FSL	West	4th	31	39	.443	12	3rd	41	29	.586	3	
2008	High-A	FSL	West	2nd	37	33	.529	8.5	1st ^	48	20	.706	—	Lost semifinals (Fort Myers) 0–2
2009	High-A	FSL	North	3rd	33	34	.493	8.5	3rd	34	33	.507	13.5	
2010	High-A	FSL	North	1st ^	41	29	.586	—	5th	31	38	.449	12	Lost semifinals (Tampa) 0–2
2011	High-A	FSL	North	3rd	39	31	.557	8	1st ^	40	30	.571	—	Lost semifinals (Daytona) 1–2
2012	High-A	FSL	North	1st ^	42	25	.627	—	3rd	36	30	.545	1	Lost semifinals (Lakeland) 0–2
2013	High-A	FSL	North	1st ^	37	29	.561	—	6th	26	39	.400	16.5	Lost semifinals (Daytona) 0–2
2014	High-A	FSL	North	1st ^	46	23	.667	—	5th	31	38	.449	10.5	Lost semifinals (Daytona) 0–2
2015	High-A	FSL	North	5th	32	38	.457	5	4th	29	38	.433	13	
2016	High-A	FSL	North	5th	33	36	.478	9	1st ^	43	23	.652	—	Lost semifinals (Tampa) 1–2
2017	High-A	FSL	North	4th	34	35	.493	4.5	2nd ¤	38	31	.551	10	Won semifinals (Tampa) 2–1 †; Co-champions with Palm Beach Cardinals^{[a]}
2018	High-A	FSL	North	5th	31	37	.456	7	3rd	38	31	.551	7	
2019	High-A	FSL	North	1st ^	41	24	.631	—	1st ^	39	31	.557	—	No playoffs held^{[b]}
2020	High-A	FSL	North	Season canceled due to COVID-19 pandemic										
2021	Low-A	SE	West	4th	57	63	.475	18	No split season					
2022	A	FSL	West	5th	28	38	.424	14	1st ^	38	25	.603	—	Won semifinals (Fort Myers) 2–1; Lost finals (St. Lucie) 0–2
2023	A	FSL	West	4th	32	34	.485	12.5	6th	30	36	.455	14	
2024	A	FSL	West	3rd	34	32	.515	9	3rd	35	29	.547	2.5	
2025	A	FSL	West	4th	34	31	.523	4.5	5th	26	35	.426	9.5	

- ^{a} The championship series was canceled due to the impending threat from Hurricane Irma.
- ^{b} The playoffs were canceled due to the impending threat from Hurricane Dorian.

=== All-time records ===
Statistic	Wins	Losses	Win %
Regular season record (1978–2024)	2,833	2,595	.526
Postseason record (1978–2024)	16	41	.281
All-time regular and postseason record	2,849	2,636	.519

== Roster ==
Dunedin Blue Jays roster
Players		Coaches/Other
Pitchers: 18 Reese Bassinger; -- Eduar Gonzalez; 40 Brayden Heidel; 26 Nolan Higgins; 24 Karson Ligon; 46 Carson Messina; 33 Jack Nedrow; 5 Miguel Pantoja; 39 Dayne Pengelly; 37 Deiker Pineda; 3 Blake Purnell; 25 Denis Samudio; 31 Gavin Seebold; 45 Jared Spencer; 9 Giacomo Taschin; 51 Edrwin Veras; 43 Landon Waters; 44 Isaac Williams	Catchers: 14 Jake Bennett; 20 Owen Carapellotti; 16 Giaconino Lasarcina; Infielders: 21 Ryan Cooney; 7 Ryan Franden; 30 Aldo Gaxiola; -- Owen Gregg; 41 Brayden Martin; 8 Juan Sánchez; Outfielders: 22 Enmanuel Bonilla; 23 Blaine Bullard; 6 Jake Cook; 1 Dean West	Manager: -- Ryan Casteel; Coaches: -- Antonio Caceres (assistant pitching); -- Andy Fermin (coach); -- Brett Kennedy (pitching); -- Nash Knight (hitting); -- Ashley Stephenson (bench); 7-day injured list; * On Toronto Blue Jays 40-man roster; ~ Development list; # Rehab assignment; ∞ Reserve list; ‡ Restricted list; § Suspended list; † Temporarily inactive list; Roster updated November 13, 2026; Transactions; → More rosters: MiLB • Florida State League; → Toronto Blue Jays minor league players

== Players ==
Dunedin Blue Jays players who have made it to Toronto:

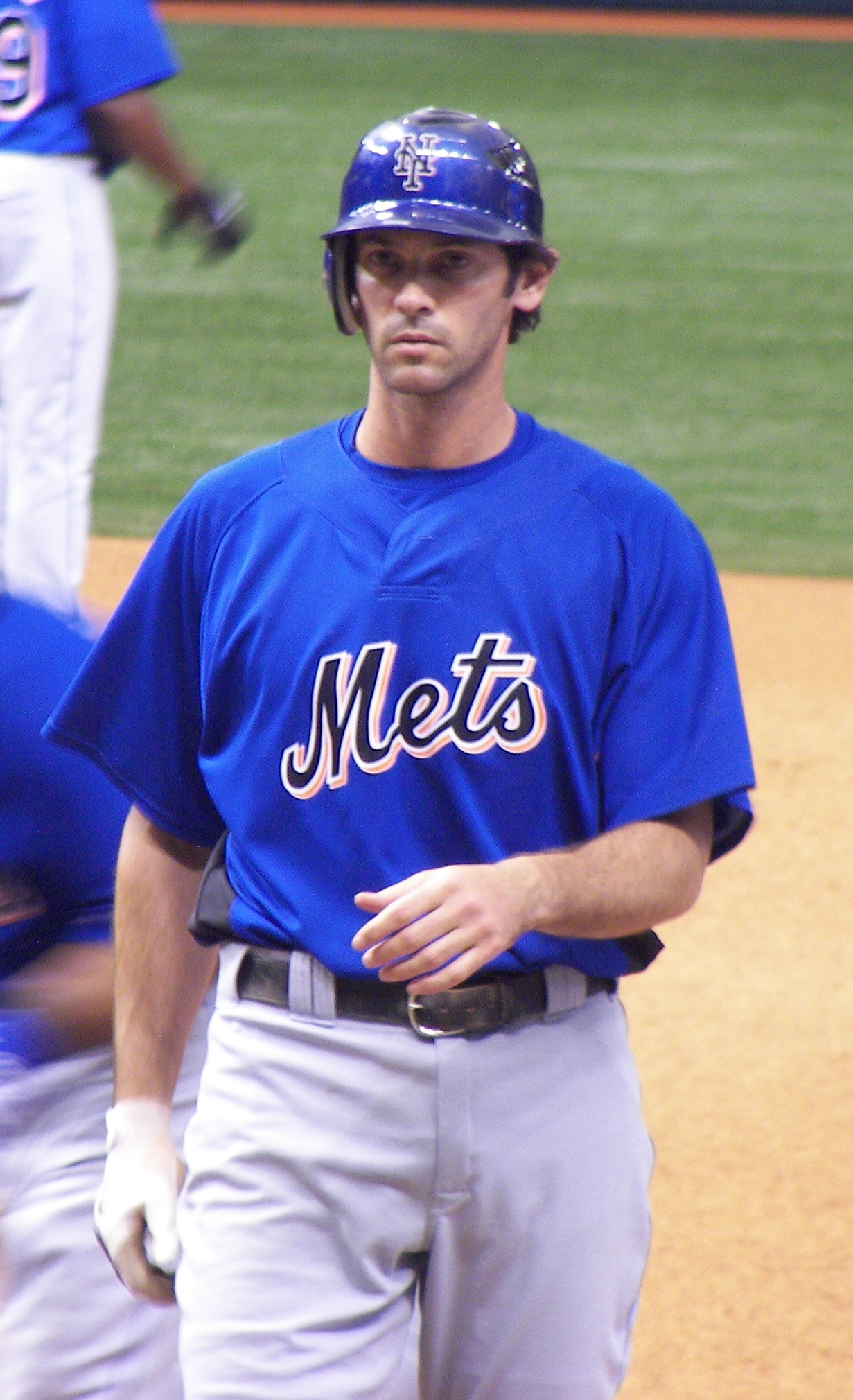
Shawn Green

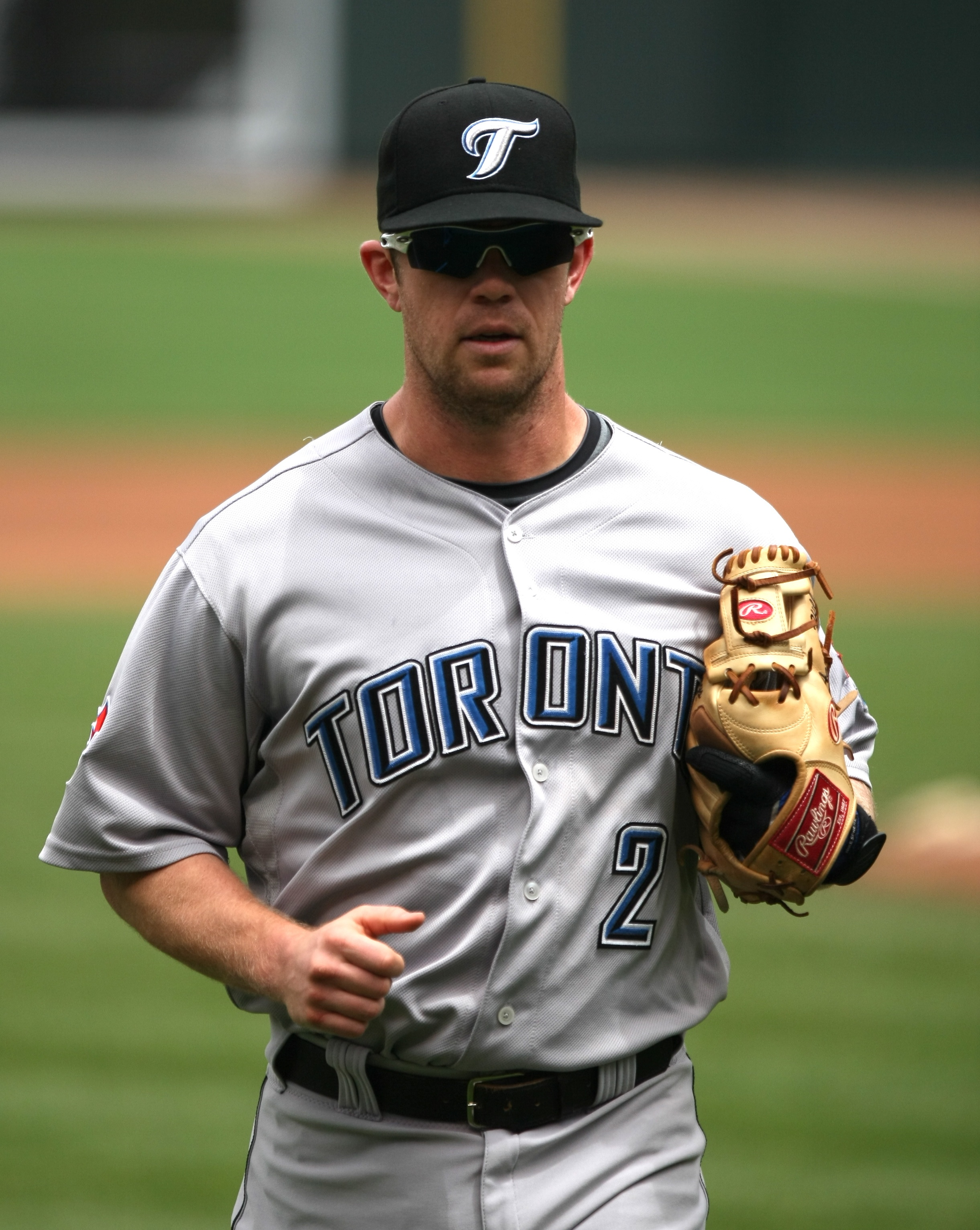
Aaron Hill

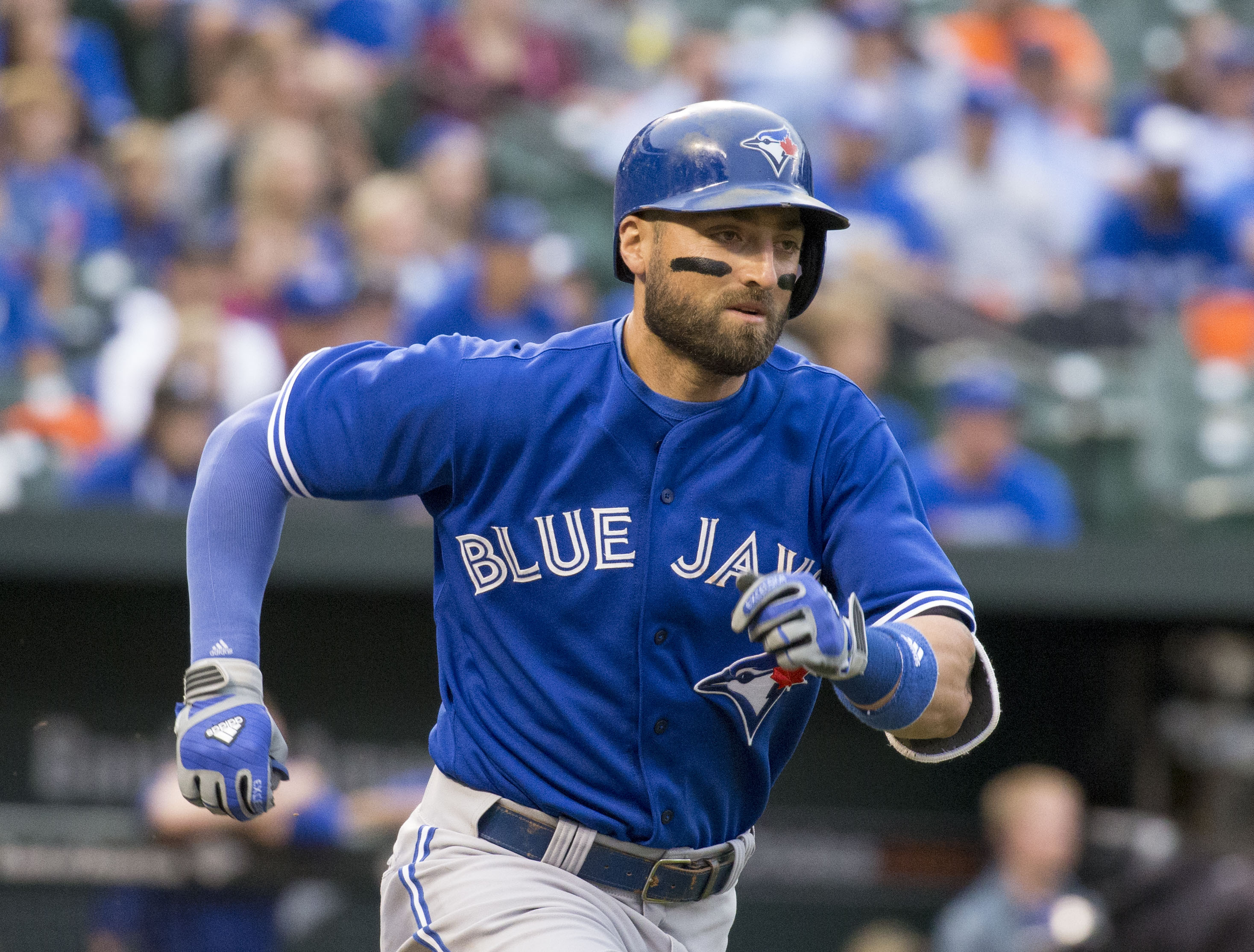
Kevin Pillar

- Jeremy Accardo
- Russ Adams
- J. P. Arencibia
- Addison Barger
- Derek Bell
- Bo Bichette, 2-time All-Star
- Pat Borders
- Dave Bush
- Rob Butler
- Chris Carpenter, 3-time All-Star
- Brett Cecil, All-Star 2013
- Gustavo Chacín
- Carlos Delgado, 2-time All-Star
- Kelvim Escobar
- Shawn Green, 2-time All-Star
- Gabe Gross
- Vladimir Guerrero Jr., 5-time All-Star
- Juan Guzmán All-Star 1992
- Roy Halladay, 8-time All-Star, Hall of Fame inductee
- Pat Hentgen, 3-time All-Star
- Aaron Hill All-Star 2009
- Orlando Hudson
- Casey Janssen
- Reed Johnson
- Jeff Kent, 5-time All-Star
- Billy Koch
- Brandon League All-Star 2011
- Adam Lind
- Jesse Litsch
- Shaun Marcum
- Dustin McGowan
- Lloyd Moseby All-star 1986
- Josh Phelps
- Kevin Pillar
- David Purcey
- Alex Ríos, 2-time All-Star
- Ricky Romero All Star 2011
- Travis Snider
- Ed Sprague Jr. All-Star 1999
- Shannon Stewart
- Dave Stieb, 7-time All-Star
- Rowdy Tellez
- Mike Timlin
- Dave Weathers
- Vernon Wells, 3-time All-Star
- Woody Williams, All-Star 2003, Game 1 World Series starter 2004
- Trey Yesavage
