= Ed Alstrom =

American stadium organist

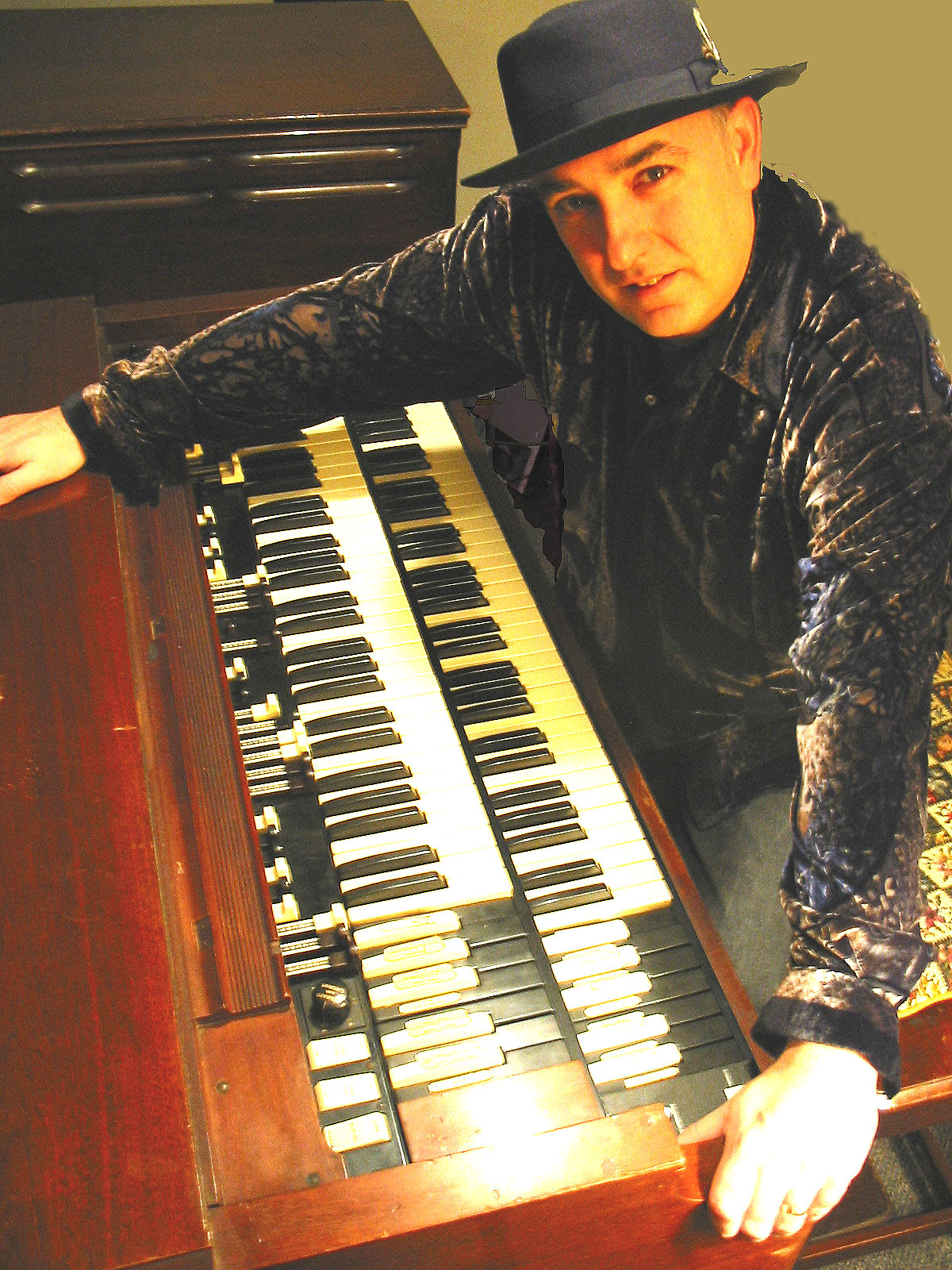
- Alstrom in 2005 at the Hammond Organ
- Born: October 12, 1957 (age 68); Paterson, New Jersey
- Occupation: Stadium Organist • Church music director
- Organization(s): New York Yankees, MLB
- Website: www.edalstrom.com

Edward Alstrom (born October 12, 1957) is an American musician best known for being the weekend stadium organist for the Major League Baseball's New York Yankees.

== Early life and education ==
Alstrom was born to Eleanor "Petty" (née Bissinger) and Ludwig "Eddie" Alstrom in Paterson, New Jersey. He was raised in Ridgewood, New Jersey. He began practicing playing the organ at home on his family’s Hammond M-3 at the age of five. He learned to play guitar, drums and bass as a teenager. He enrolled at Westminster Choir College at what is now Rider University in 1975 with a declared major of organ performance and graduated with a bachelor's degree in classical organ. While he was attending school he was also playing music in bars in North Jersey, "disco, rock, country music, and jazz gigs." Alstrom worked at Casio in Dover, New Jersey as the Product/Marketing Manager for the Keyboard Division from 1985 through 2003. He assisted with Casio's R&D in Japan, composed and arranged the music that went into the keyboards, and produced a video for Casio entitled "Play Electronic Keyboard Today."

He lives in Montville, New Jersey, where he has been married to music educator and pianist Maxine Alstrom since 1985. They have two daughters, Sophie and Nina.

== Career ==
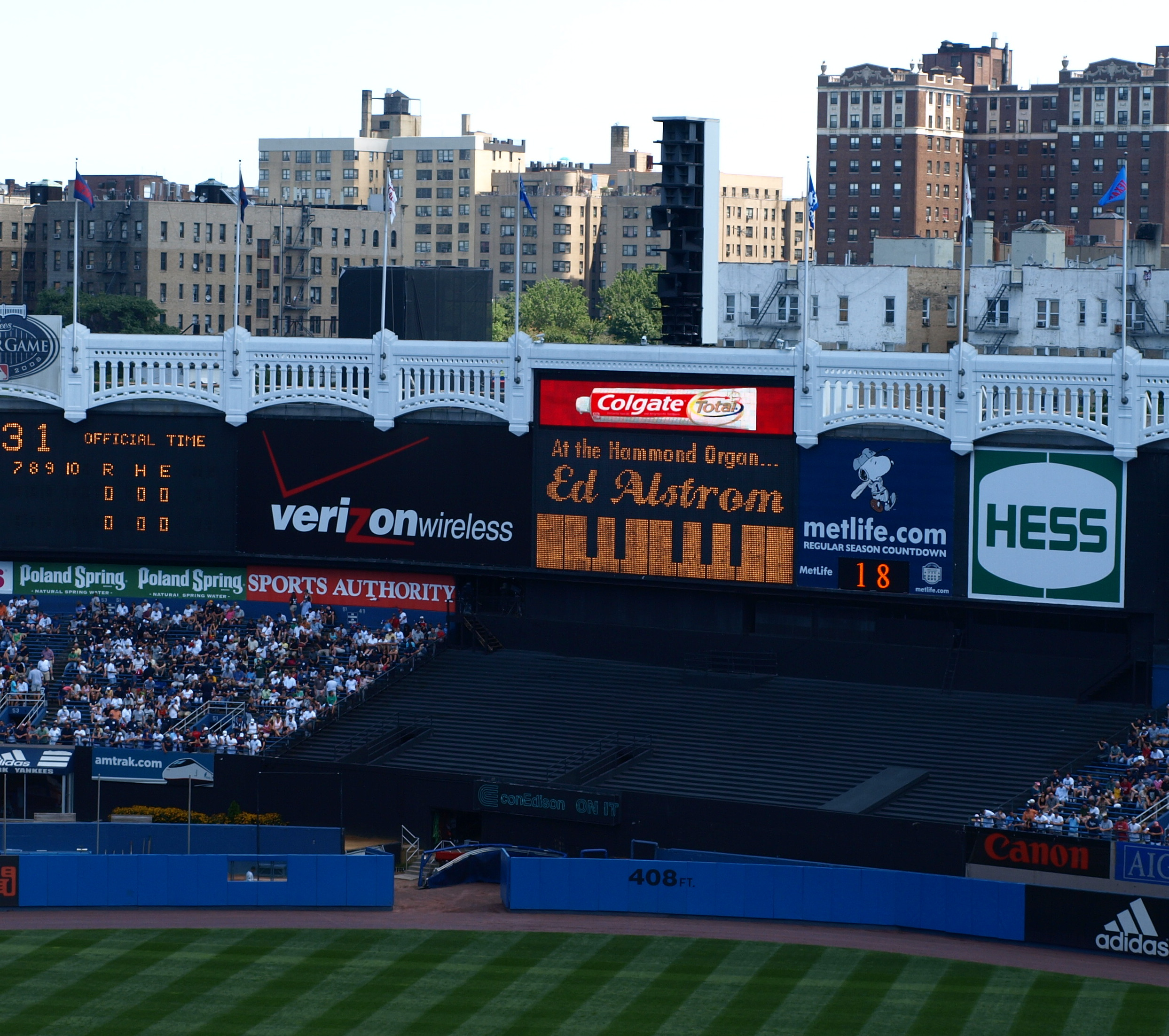
Screen at the old Yankee Stadium featuring Alstrom's name

Alstrom describes himself as an "itinerant musician" and has played for synagogues, churches, feature films, Broadway musicals and at Yankee Stadium. He has performed with Chuck Berry, Leonard Bernstein, Bette Midler, Herbie Hancock, and Steely Dan. He played in the pit bands for "Leader of the Pack" and "Hairspray." He is in a trio called Acid Cabaret which formed in 1997. He won a Back Stage Bistro Award for Singer/Songwriter/Instrumentalist in 2003 for his work with Acid Cabaret.

In 2004 Alstrom took over for Yankees’ longtime organist, Eddie Layton, who retired after 37 years with the team. He plays at weekend home games for the team at Yankee Stadium and was interviewed for the position by Layton himself. Layton asked him to perform "New York, New York," "Take Me Out to the Ballgame," "Happy Birthday," "The Star-Spangled Banner," and "O Canada" in an audition that Alstrom says took five minutes. He played at the final game at the old Yankee Stadium on Sept. 21, 2008, playing "Goodnight, Sweetheart" among other music.

Alstrom plays a 15-minute solo spot before games begin. He always leads off with "New York, New York." and then plays an assortment of standards, classic songs, and current hits. While much of the organ music during baseball games follows a framework, Alstrom discusses the need to be flexible on the job, saying, "You have to be alert and react to what’s happening and think several steps ahead... You have to know the game and be thinking all the time." He played for the Yankees’ victory over the Los Angeles Angels in the American League Championship Series in 2009, and subsequently played for Game 1 of the World Series, when the Phillies beat the Yankees. New York Times music critic Anthony Tommasini, on hearing Alstrom playing in the new Yankee Stadium, said "I wish the Yankees would let their organists play more."

Alstrom has been the music director of Central Presbyterian Church in Montclair, New Jersey, since 2016. He also is an accompanist—in piano, guitar, and organ—and choir director at Temple Ner Tamid in Bloomfield, New Jersey. He was a music teacher and choir director at Golda Och Academy in West Orange from 2017 to 2019, where he worked to get his students out of the mindset that "this is their grandparents’ music." He worked at Essex Valley School in West Caldwell, New Jersey from 2019 to 2021, and at Warren Middle School in 2022.

Alstrom creates solo compositions, including a "jazz mass" which combines hymnal texts, poetry and 1970s free-form jazz music. Alstrom wanted to depart from traditional compositions, saying "I just wanted to find a way to do a jazz mass that was not the usual way that was done... The standard jazz mass form... adopts the Latin text and puts some swing beats behind it." Alstrom played the organ for the Jackie Robinson biopic 42. He was asked to try to sound like Gladys Goodding, the organist for the Brooklyn Dodgers at Ebbets Field.

== Discography ==
- Peter Hofmann – Live 86 (Arranger, CBS, 1986)
- The Record People Are Coming (Haywire, 1996)
- Acid Cabaret (Haywire, 2002)
- Gettin’ Organ-ized (Haywire, 2010)
- This Idea Of Humanity (Haywire, 2026)
