= Alström syndrome =

Rare genetic disorder involving childhood obesity and multiple organ dysfunction

- Specialty: Medical genetics, ophthalmology, neurology
- Symptoms: cone-rod dystrophy, photophobia, nystagmus, hearing impairment, cardiomyopathy, childhood obesity, extreme insulin resistance, accelerated non-alcoholic fatty liver disease, renal dysfunction, respiratory disease, endocrine and urologic disorders
- Usual onset: Clinical symptoms often appear in infancy but have great variability in both age of onset and symptom severity.
- Causes: Variants in the ALMS1 gene on chromosome 2p13
- Diagnostic method: Based on symptoms and genetic testing
- Treatment: Management of symptoms
- Prognosis: Life expectancy is typically between 40-50 years
- Named after: Carl-Henry Alström

Alström syndrome (AS) is a very rare multi-system, autosomal recessive genetic disorder characterized by type 2 diabetes, cone-rod dystrophy resulting in blindness, sensorineural hearing loss and cardiomyopathy. Endocrine disorders typically also occur, such as hypergonadotrophic hypogonadism and hypothyroidism, as well as acanthosis nigricans resulting from hyperinsulinemia.

AS is caused by variants in the ALMS1 gene, which is located on the chromosome 2-13 and is involved in the formation of cellular cilia, making Alström syndrome a ciliopathy. At least 300 disease-causing variants in ALMS1 have been described as of 2023. Alström syndrome is sometimes confused with Bardet–Biedl syndrome, another ciliopathy which has similar symptoms, but Bardet–Biedl syndrome tends to be associated with multiple genes, rather than just one like in AS, and includes polydactyly.

There is no cure or specific therapy for Alström syndrome. However, various treatments target the individual symptoms and can include diet, specialized glasses, hearing aids, medications for diabetes and heart issues, and dialysis and/or transplantation in the case of kidney or liver failure. Prognosis varies depending on the specific combination of symptoms, but individuals with Alström syndrome rarely live beyond 50.

Prevalence of AS is cited as 1 in 1,000,000 individuals in the general population, but this is expected to be an underestimation due to the phenotypic variation of the disease and the high rate of misdiagnosis. There is a higher frequency of variants within French Acadians and English populations.

== Research ==
Alström Syndrome was first discovered by Swedish psychiatrist, Carl-Henry Alström and his three associates, B. Hallgren, I. B. Nilsson and H. Asander, in 1946. Alström and his colleagues published their first manuscript in 1959, which contained a very thorough investigation of three patients with a recessive combination of retinal degeneration, obesity, sensorineural hearing loss, and diabetes, which are all extremely common symptoms in AS. The syndrome was first known as Alström-Hallgren Syndrome, but has since been more widely known as just Alström Syndrome.

In 2001 Jackson Laboratory in Bar Harbor, Maine, USA with the University of Southampton, UK isolated the single gene (ALMS1) responsible for Alström syndrome. The Jackson Laboratory created the very first mouse model for AS, Alms1-/-, or more colloquially known as "Carl Henry Mouse" in 2004. These mice continue to be used in research studies to simulate the symptoms of an individual with AS.

== Cause ==
Alström syndrome is inherited in an autosomal recessive manner.

Alström syndrome is caused by a mutation in the ALMS1 gene, located on the short arm of chromosome 2p13. The gene mutation is inherited as an autosomal recessive trait. This means both parents have to pass a defective copy of the ALMS1 gene in order for their child to have the syndrome, even though the parents may not show signs or symptoms of the condition.

The ALMS1 gene contains instructions to encode a specific protein known as ALMS1. The protein then is involved in ciliary maintenance and function, cell cycle control, energy balance homeostasis, and intracellular transport. It has a role in the proper function, maintenance and formation of cilia, which are found in all types of cells in the body. Most of these variants have led to the production of a dysfunctional version of the ALSM1 protein which are present in tissues, but at low levels.

== Signs and symptoms ==
Symptoms for Alström syndrome can be extremely variable in both age of onset and presentation. Some common symptoms include:

- Retinal dystrophy (cone-rod dystrophy) in all cases, usually within a few weeks of birth and progressively worsening until about 20 years of age when vision is lost. Nystagmus (often one of the first symptoms identified) and photophobia are also very common.
- Mild to moderate progressive bilateral sensorineural hearing loss. Hearing impairment is typically diagnosed between the ages of 1 and 10.
- Congestive heart failure (dilated cardiomyopathy) in over 60% of individuals over the course of their lifetimes. Around 40% of individuals suffer from a severe cardiomyopathy within the first few months of life. For those who survive, cardiomyopathy occurs in 1 of 5 patients with onset in adolescence or adulthood.
- Hypothyroidism tends to occur in less than half of patients.
- Growth hormone dysfunction is common in around half of individuals with AS.
- Thoracic and lumbar scoliosis, kyphosis, or lordosis is present in around 68% of patients.
- Male hypergonadotropic and hypogonadotropic hypogonadism and female hyperandrogenism.
  - Men can experience microphallus, undescended testes, hypospadias, small testes, and gynecomastia. They are also unlikely to be fertile.
  - Women can experience hirsutism, alopecia, oligomenorrhea/amenorrhea, polycystic ovaries, high testosterone levels, abnormal breast development, precocious puberty, and endometriosis. Female fertility is unlikely and only reported in a few cases.
- Childhood obesity occurs in most people with AS. Alström infants are usually within the normal birth weight and then experience rapid weight gain within the first 2–36 months.
- Hyperphagia or polyphagia is common within Alström populations and has been shown to contribute to weight gain.
- Moderate to severe hypertriglyceridemia occurs in most individuals.
- Almost all individuals with AS experience insulin resistance and/or hyperinsulinemia to some degree. Therefore, type 2 diabetes mellitus often results as early as 5 years of age with a median onset of 16 years.
- Non-alcoholic fatty liver disease is common in AS. This often progresses to non-alcoholic steatohepatitis.
- Upper and lower respiratory tract infections in childhood, which decrease during adulthood.
  - Bronchitis, pneumonia, and sinusitis have also been reported.
  - Increased susceptibility to hypoxemia during or after surgery.
  - Chronic obstructive pulmonary disease, interstitial lung disease, or acute respiratory distress syndrome is also seen in some older patients.
- Chronic kidney disease is common in some cases that can lead to end-stage renal disease/kidney failure as early as mid-to late teens.
- Less than half of individuals experience dysuria.
- Epigastric pain, nausea, and gastroesophageal reflux disease are common.
- Delays in gross and fine motor skills, learning disabilities, and mixed receptive-expressive language delays are common. Cognitive impairment, however, is very rare.
- Delays in early developmental milestones in 50% of cases, learning disabilities in about 30% of cases.
- Seizures and hyporeflexia have been reported but are less common (20% of individuals).

== Diagnosis ==
Diagnosis typically occurs in the first few years of life and should be confirmed with a review of symptoms as well as genetic testing with targeted panels that include the ALMS1 gene as well as other ciliopathies, retinal diseases, cardiomyopathy, and obesity. Typically, the first symptoms to be observed are nystagmus, photophobia, impaired vision, and/or infantile cardiomyopathy within the first two years of life. Obesity and/or sensorineural hearing loss are often next and should be followed by genetic/molecular testing to try and identify two pathogenic variants of ALMS1 to confirm or deny the presence of the disease.

However, the rarity of the disease, variability of symptoms, and lack of experts can make diagnosis very difficult. Additionally, since it can be difficult to identify both biallelic pathogenic variants in the ALMS1 gene, there is existing diagnostic criteria as shown below.

Alström Syndrome Diagnostic Criteria by Age Chart from 2019 Gene Review
Age Range	Major Diagnostic Criteria	Minor Diagnostic Criteria	Minimum Required
0 – 2 years	-1 ALMS1 variant OR family history of Alström syndrome -Visual impairment -Infantile cardiomyopathy	-Obesity -Hearing loss	-2 major criteria OR -1 major + 2 minor criteria
3–14 years	-1 ALMS1 variant OR family history of Alström syndrome -Visual impairment -History of infantile cardiomyopathy	-Hearing loss -Obesity AND/OR its complications -Restrictive cardiomyopathy -Decreased renal function	-2 major criteria OR -1 major + 3 minor criteria
15 years - adult	-1 ALMS1 variant OR family history of Alström syndrome -Visual impairment	-Hearing loss -Restrictive cardiomyopathy AND/OR history of infantile cardiomyopathy -Obesity AND/OR its complications -Chronic kidney disease	-2 major + 2 minor criteria OR -1 major + 4 minor criteria

== Assessment ==
Due to Alström Syndrome's effect on nearly every organ system of the body, experts strongly recommend a multidisciplinary team of professionals with experience caring for those with AS when possible. The following multidisciplinary assessment is recommended for those with AS:

Specialists and Assessment Recommendations 2020 Consensus Guidelines
Discipline	Features of AS for which this discipline may be of assistance	Initial Assessment	Follow-up
Primary Care Physician	Provide oversight & coordinate specialists	First referral at time of diagnosis	6 months or less as per clinical need
Geneticists/clinical scientists	Prenatal screening, AS diagnosis, counseling for families	First referral prenatal or during childhood. Initial assessment: detection of two ALMS1 variants. Then, possible investigation of parental genotypic information	As per request or clinical need
Opthalamologists	Blindness, nystagmus, photophobia, retinal dystrophy	First referral before the age of one. Initial assessment includes: standard evaluation, imaging, and testing	Annually
ENT specialist	Progressive bilateral sensorineural hearing loss	First referral usually during childhood. Assessment includes otologic and audiologic evaluation of both ears.	Annually
Cardiologist	Infantile, juvenile, or adult onset cardiomyopathy, hypertension, coronary artery disease, heart failure	First referral before the age of one. Initial assessment: natriuretic peptides, transthoracic echocardiography (TTE), ECG. In older children and adult, include CMR	ECG - yearly TTE - yearly or per clinical need
Pulmonologist	Assess for pulmonary fibrosis, restrictive lung disease, pulmonary hypertension	First referral during adulthood. Initial assessment includes Conventional Pulmonary Function test (cPFT) and chest X-ray, and HRCT Thorax when needed.	HRCT Thorax - as per clinical need
Endocrinologist/Metabolic Specialist	Assess and treatment of metabolic complications (obesity, insulin-resistance, type II diabetes, non-alcoholic fatty liver disease, dyslipidemia) and endocrine disorders (hypothyroidism, GH deficiency, male hypogonadism, female hypoandrogenism)	First referral during childhood. Initial assessment: Body measurements, thyroid Function Test (TFT), pituitary and sexual hormones, glucose levels, HbA1c, and lipid profile.	Every 6–12 months in children, then yearly
Gastroenterologist/hepatologist	Assess for liver fibrosis/cirrhosis and associated complications (portal hypertension, cancer, liver failure).	First referral: From childhood to adulthood Initial assessment: Liver function tests, platelet count, liver ultrasound, transient elastography and ELF test. Upper endoscopy (EGD) in case of cirrhosis	Yearly or per clinical need Liver ultrasound yearly or as per clinical need
Nephrologist	Assess for progressive renal dysfunction and Chronic Kidney Disease	First referral: from mid-childhood to adulthood Initial assessment: Kidney function test and renal ultrasonography	Yearly or per clinical need
Neurologist	Assess of developmental milestones, learning disability, mixed receptive-expressive language delays, seizure, and hyporeflexia	First referral during childhood. Initial assessment: Neurological examination, school and social performance, interviews with parents, and intelligence tests	As per clinical need
Anesthesiologist	Assess for anaesthetic risk before surgery	First referral as per clinical need.	As per clinical need
Clinical psychology/behavioral therapy team	Mental health disorders, such as anxiety, isolation, and depression.	First referral: from mid-childhood to adulthood	Yearly or per clinical need
Physiotherapist	Physical exercise	First referral: from childhood to adulthood, as per clinical need Initial assessment: physical examination	Yearly or as per clinical need
Dietician	Personalized diet, weight, and lifestyle management	First referral during childhood	Every 6–12 months or as per clinical need
Speech and language therapist	Assess of sensorial impairment on communication and social interactions including speech perception and recognition, sound localization, and distance evaluation.	First referral during childhood.	Yearly or as required
Social worker	Connecting patients and families living with disabilities with resources	First referral: from childhood to adulthood	As required
Patients' Association	Support to patients and their families.	First referral at the time of diagnosis	As required

== Management ==
There is no cure for Alström syndrome. Therefore, treatment should aim to reduce the burden of symptoms and prevent further complications. Some of these treatment aims include:

- Corrective lenses: Orange or rose-tinted lenses help with the sensitivity from bright lights. The patients may have to adapt to reading in Braille, use adaptive equipment, mobility aids, such as canes and guide dogs, and other assistive technology can help individuals with AS maximize their skills and thrive.
- Hearing aids: the battery-operated devices are available in three styles: behind the ear, in the ear and inside the ear canal. Behind the ear aims for mild-to-profound hearing loss. In the ear aims for mild to severe hearing loss. Lastly, the canal device is aimed for mild to moderately severe hearing loss. Patients that have severe hearing loss may benefit from a cochlear implant.
- Pharmacological Intervention: Many symptoms, such as Type II diabetes, obesity, and more related to AS can be managed with pharmacological support. See below medication section.
- Diet: an appropriate and healthy diet is necessary for individuals with Alström syndrome because it could potentially decreases chances of obesity or diabetes.
- Physical Activity: exercising reduces chances of being obese and helping control blood sugar levels.

== Medication ==
=== Cardiovascular ===
- Cardiomyopathy/heart failure - Angiotensin receptor blockers (ARBs), angiotensin converting enzyme inhibitors (ACEis), angiotensin receptor-neprilysin inhibitors (ARNis), beta-blockers, calcium channel blockers, loop diuretics, thiazide diuretics, mineralocorticoid receptor antagonists (MRAs), vasodilators
  - Note that blood pressure control is also renally protective.

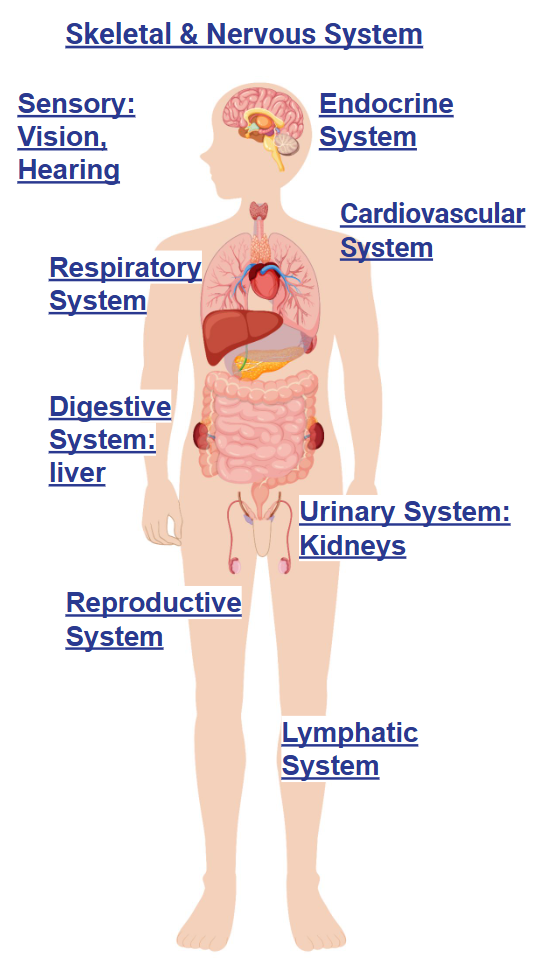
Body systems involved in Alstrom syndrome

=== Thyroid ===
- Hypothyroidism - Levothyroxine, liothyronine

=== Endocrine ===
- Insulin Resistance, hyperinsulinemia, type II Diabetes, hypertriglyceridemia - Sodium-glucose transport protein 2 inhibitors, metformin, sulfonylureas, DPP-4 inhibitors, short and long-acting insulin

=== Obesity ===
- Obesity in adults - Glucagon-like peptide-1 receptor agonists

=== Liver ===
- Non-alcoholic fatty liver disease - Laxatives

=== Respiratory ===
- Bronchitis, pneumonia, asthma, and sinusitis - Inhaled corticosteroids, short and long-acting bronchodilators
- Chronic Obstructive Pulmonary Disease - Inhalers

=== Gastrointestinal ===
- Gastroesophageal reflux disease - Proton pump inhibitors
