= Grant Field (Dunedin) =

Baseball stadium located in Dunedin, Florida

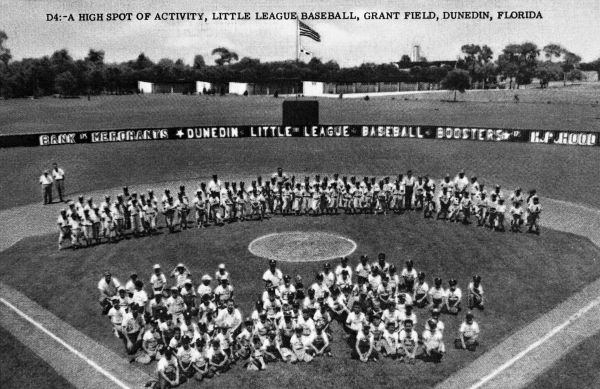
- Little League Baseball at Grant Field in Dunedin, Florida in the 1950s
- Interactive map of Grant Field
- Location: 373 Douglas Avenue; Dunedin, FL 34698
- Coordinates: 28°0′13″N 82°47′11″W
- Owner: City of Dunedin Parks & Recreation Department
- Operator: City of Dunedin Parks & Recreation Department
- Capacity: 1,200-2,000 (1976); 3,417 (1977–1989)
- Surface: Grass
- Field size: Left Field – 345 ft Left-Center – ft Center Field – ft Right-Center – ft Right Field – 301 ft (1977–1983)

Construction
- Groundbreaking: 1930
- Opened: 1930
- Closed: 1989
- Demolished: 1990

Tenants
- San Antonio Missions (TL) (Spring training) (1953–1954, 1956); Buffalo Bisons (IL) (Spring training) (1959–1962); Dunedin High School (1961-?); FIL Tigers (FIL) (early 1970s); Dunedin Blue Jays (FSL) (1978–1979, 1987–1989); Toronto Blue Jays (Spring training) (1977–1989)

Grant Field was a baseball stadium located in Dunedin, Florida. It was the longtime home of Dunedin amateur baseball and the first spring training home of the Toronto Blue Jays, as well as home to the Dunedin Blue Jays of the Class A Florida State League. It was closed in 1989 and replaced with TD Ballpark built on the same site.

== History ==
The field was built in 1930 and was expanded in 1934 as a WPA project with a $250 grant from the Federal government. It was named in honor of Dunedin mayor Albert J. Grant who oversaw its construction and dedication on November 22, 1938.

Grant Field served as the spring training home of the Texas League's San Antonio Missions in 1953, 1954, and 1956 and the International League's Buffalo Bisons from 1959 through 1962. The Detroit Tigers Instructional League team played at Grant Field in the early 1970s.

Many Major League Baseball players worked out together at Grant Field in February and March 1976 when Major League Baseball owners locked out the players from spring training until March 19, 1976.

== Toronto Blue Jays spring training ==
The Toronto Blue Jays announced on August 26, 1976 they had selected Dunedin as their spring training home. Dunedin was a 30-minute drive from the Tampa airport with daily flights to and from Toronto and nearby to other Major League spring training sites including the Philadelphia Phillies in Clearwater, the New York Mets and St. Louis Cardinals in St. Petersburg, the Cincinnati Reds in Tampa, and the Pittsburgh Pirates in Bradenton.

Grant Field was located near the downtown and the city improved the ballpark with new seats, fences, and clubhouses. The city increased seating by approximately 1,200 to 2,000, and brought trailers to the site to house the team's front office staff.

The Toronto Blue Jays' first exhibition game ever and at Grant Field was scheduled for March 10, 1977 against the Philadelphia Phillies, but was cancelled due to rain. Instead, the first game was March 11, 1977 against the New York Mets. Wire services reported, "Spectators who arrived too late to purchase tickets inhabited areas down the foul lines, outside the outfield fences and some even took seats in the Babe Ruth League grandstand located down the right field line, some 500 feet away from home plate." Bill Singer started the game for the Blue Jays and surrendered a lead off homerun to the Mets' Lee Mazzilli. The Blue Jays came back and won 3–1 in front of 1,988 fans.

A new home clubhouse was constructed beneath the third base grandstand prior to the 1985 season.

In 1990, at a cost of approximately $2.4 million, the City of Dunedin razed Grant Field's grandstand and built a new stadium called Dunedin Stadium at the same location. The new stadium increased capacity to 6,106. The playing field and team clubhouses did not change.
