= 2013–14 Australian Baseball League season =

- League: Australian Baseball League
- Sport: Baseball
- Duration: 31 October 2013 – 8 February 2014
- Games: 125
- Teams: 6
- Total attendance: 147,887

Regular season
- Season MVP: Ryan Casteel

Championship Series
- Venue: Barbagallo Ballpark
- Champions: Perth Heat (3rd title)
- Runners-up: Canberra Cavalry

Seasons
- ← 2012–13 2014–15 →

The 2013–14 Australian Baseball League season was the fourth Australian Baseball League (ABL) season, and was held from 31 October 2013 to 8 February 2014. The season started with a game between the Melbourne Aces and the Canberra Cavalry at Narrabundah Ballpark in Canberra. The Perth Heat won their third title in four seasons defeating defending champions the Canberra Cavalry in the finals.

== Teams ==

Teams in the ABL
Team	City	State	Stadium	Ref
Adelaide Bite	Adelaide	South Australia	Norwood Oval	
Brisbane Bandits	Brisbane	Queensland	Brisbane Exhibition Ground	
Canberra Cavalry	Canberra	Australian Capital Territory	Narrabundah Ballpark	
Melbourne Aces	Melbourne	Victoria	Melbourne Ballpark	
Perth Heat	Perth	Western Australia	Baseball Park	
Sydney Blue Sox	Sydney	New South Wales	Blue Sox Stadium	

== Regular season ==
Pos	Team	Pld	W	L	PCT	GB	Qualification
1	Perth Heat	46	32	14	.696	—	Advance to Championship Series
2	Sydney Blue Sox	46	23	23	.500	9	Advance to Preliminary final
3	Canberra Cavalry	46	22	24	.478	10	Advance to Preliminary final
4	Melbourne Aces	46	22	24	.478	10	
5	Adelaide Bite	46	21	25	.457	11	
6	Brisbane Bandits	46	18	28	.391	14	

=== Statistical leaders ===
Batting leaders
Stat	Player (Note: Minimum 2.7 PAs per team game.)	Team	Total
AVG	Ryan Casteel	Melbourne Aces	.343
HR	Ryan Casteel	Melbourne Aces	11
RBI	Brandon Tripp	Perth Heat	41
R	Jon Berti	Canberra Cavalry	46
H	Brandon Tripp	Perth Heat	58
SB	Jon Berti	Canberra Cavalry	31

Pitching leaders
Stat	Player (Note: Minimum 0.8 IP per team game.)	Team	Total
W	Jack Frawley	Perth Heat	7
L	Aaron Sookee	Sydney Blue Sox	7
ERA	Mike Ekstrom	Perth Heat	0.72
K	Brian Grening	Canberra Cavalry	70
IP	Craig Anderson	Sydney Blue Sox	78
SV	Dae-Sung Koo Sean Toler	Sydney Blue Sox Canberra Cavalry	11

== Postseason ==
Three teams qualified for a two-round postseason. The highest placed team at the end of the regular season gained entry to and hosted the championship series. The other place was determined by a preliminary final series between the second and third placed teams, hosted by the second placed team.

Preliminary Final Series			Championship Series
			1	Perth Heat	2
2	Sydney Blue Sox	1	3	Canberra Cavalry	0
3	Canberra Cavalry	2

=== Preliminary final series ===
31 January; Game 1	Sydney Blue Sox	18 – 11	Canberra Cavalry	(Australian Capital Territory) Narrabundah Ballpark, Canberra; Umpires: HP: Mal Mackay. 1B: Paul Hyham. 2B: Trent Thomas. 3B: Takahito Matsuda
31 January; Game 1		Boxscore		(Australian Capital Territory) Narrabundah Ballpark, Canberra; Umpires: HP: Mal Mackay. 1B: Paul Hyham. 2B: Trent Thomas. 3B: Takahito Matsuda

1 February; Game 2	Sydney Blue Sox	3 – 4	Canberra Cavalry	(New South Wales) Blue Sox Stadium, Sydney; Umpires: HP: Paul Hyham. 1B: Trent Thomas. 2B: Takahito Matsuda. 3B: Mal Mackay
1 February; Game 2		Boxscore		(New South Wales) Blue Sox Stadium, Sydney; Umpires: HP: Paul Hyham. 1B: Trent Thomas. 2B: Takahito Matsuda. 3B: Mal Mackay

2 February; Game 3	Sydney Blue Sox	1 – 9	Canberra Cavalry	(New South Wales) Blue Sox Stadium, Sydney; Umpires: HP: Trent Thomas. 1B: Takahito Matsuda. 2B: Mal Mackay. 3B: Paul Hyham
2 February; Game 3		Boxscore		(New South Wales) Blue Sox Stadium, Sydney; Umpires: HP: Trent Thomas. 1B: Takahito Matsuda. 2B: Mal Mackay. 3B: Paul Hyham

=== Championship series ===
7 February; Game 1	Perth Heat	4 – 3	Canberra Cavalry	(Western Australia) Barbagallo Ballpark, Perth; Umpires: HP: Brett Robson. 1B: Paul Hyham. 2B: Mal Mackay. 3B: Trent Thomas
7 February; Game 1		Boxscore		(Western Australia) Barbagallo Ballpark, Perth; Umpires: HP: Brett Robson. 1B: Paul Hyham. 2B: Mal Mackay. 3B: Trent Thomas

8 February; Game 2	Perth Heat	2 – 1	Canberra Cavalry	(Western Australia) Barbagallo Ballpark, Perth; Umpires: HP: Brett Robson. 1B: Paul Hyham. 2B: Mal Mackay. 3B: Trent Thomas
8 February; Game 2		Boxscore		(Western Australia) Barbagallo Ballpark, Perth; Umpires: HP: Brett Robson. 1B: Paul Hyham. 2B: Mal Mackay. 3B: Trent Thomas
