= Gladys Goodding =

American stadium organist

- Born: June 18, 1893; Macon County, Missouri, U.S.
- Died: November 18, 1963 (aged 70); New York City, U.S.
- Other name: Gladys Beck
- Occupation: Organist
- Years active: 1942–1957
- Known for: Stadium organist for the Brooklyn Dodgers
- Spouse: Robert Reinholdt Beck (divorced)
- Children: 2

Gladys Goodding (June 18, 1893 – November 18, 1963) was an American musician who served as the stadium organist at Ebbets Field for the Brooklyn Dodgers from 1942 to 1957, when the team left Brooklyn and moved to Los Angeles.

She began her sports career playing organ in Madison Square Garden. In addition to the Dodgers, Goodding also performed for the New York Knicks and the New York Rangers. After the Dodgers moved, she remained in New York City and played the organ at sporting events until her death in 1963.

== Early life and career ==
Goodding was born in Macon County, Missouri to Meribah (née Riley) and Joseph Goodding, the third of their four children. Her father was a businessman and amateur violinist and her mother was a piano teacher. Her parents died when she was young; she and her younger brother were then sent to St. Louis to live in an orphanage. During her time there, she fell in love with baseball.

Upon turning 18, she moved in with her older brother in Kansas City, Missouri where she learned to sing and play the piano. Eventually, she settled in Independence, Missouri. Due to her adept skills at the piano, she mastered the fundamentals of playing the organ within two weeks and began playing at the local church. During this time she was briefly married and started a family. She began performing light opera on the Chautauqua and Lyceum entertainment circuits, where she was billed as a "soprano-pianist". After her divorce, she and her children moved to New York City.

In New York, to support her family, she became a full-time organist at Loew's Theatre, where she provided musical accompaniment for silent films. Occasionally, she also went on tour and did solo performances on the radio.

Goodding had her breakthrough in sports in 1937 when she was hired to accompany sporting events at Madison Square Garden, with the help of Ethel Mullany, the head of the Garden's booking department. She performed for New York Rangers fans and New York Knicks fans and also playing the "Star-Spangled Banner" before boxing matches.

=== Tenure with the Brooklyn Dodgers ===
External videos
- Goodding performs national anthem before Game 7 of the 1952 World Series.

In 1942, Goodding was by the Brooklyn Dodgers to play the organ at Ebbets Field. Reportedly, general manager Larry MacPhail, who was an avid piano player, hired her immediately after receiving a letter from a regular attendee at the Garden. For Goodding, the Dodgers brought an electric Hammond organ and placed it "in the baseball field 'organ loft,' a glass enclosure high above the crowd".

During her first season, she endeared herself to Dodger fans through her trademark ingenuity. For example, when umpires Bill Stewart, Ziggy Sears, and Tom Dunn stepped on the field, to the delight of the fans, she began playing "Three Blind Mice". She became a fixture at Ebbetts Field and gained widespread popularity in the borough of Brooklyn.

Goodding is responsible for beginning the modern-day practice of playing walk-up music. She played for both the home team and for visiting players. Other times, she would serenade players if it was their birthday. Her rendition of "Chiapenecas", a Mexican folksong, become a fixture during the seventh-inning stretch. When the Dodgers lost the 1952 World Series, according to The New York Times, Goodding played "played a medley of tunes that left nothing to the imagination. From a rendition of 'Blues in the Night,' Miss Goodding... drifted into 'What Can I Say, Dear, After I Say I'm Sorry.' She followed up with 'This Nearly Was Mine,' 'You Got Me Cryin’ Again,' 'Deep Purple,' and 'What a Difference a Day Makes.' When the park was virtually empty... Gladys concluded with 'Auld Lang Syne'—better known in Brooklyn as 'Wait 'Til Next Year'."

When the Dodgers made their last appearance at Ebbets Field before leaving Brooklyn for Los Angeles, Roscoe McGowan noted that she "played numerous tunes with the farewell motif" including "Thanks for the Memory" and "How Can You Say We're Through?" Jack Lang of the Long Island Star-Journal noted that she also played "California Here I Come" and "So Long, It's Been Good to Know You", ending the day with "Auld Lang Syne" as Dodger fans left the ballpark for the last time.

After the Dodgers left, Goodding continued to play at Madison Square Garden until arthritis forced her into retirement.

== Personal life ==
Goodding was married to Robert Reinholdt "Bob" Beck with whom she had two children: Robert Jr. (1915–1980) and Maxine (1916–1988). Their marriage ended in divorce, and she reverted to using her maiden name.

Goodding died of a heart attack in New York City, aged 70.
