= Clearwater Threshers =

Minor league baseball team in Florida, US

- Founded in 1985; Clearwater, Florida
Team logo
Cap insignia

Minor league affiliations
- Class: Single-A (2021–present)
- Previous classes: Class A-Advanced (1990–2020); Class A (1985–1989)
- League: Florida State League (1985–present)
- Division: West Division

Major league affiliations
- Team: Philadelphia Phillies (1985–present)

Minor league titles
- League titles (2): 1993; 2007
- Division titles (4): 1991; 1996; 2007; 2023
- First-half titles (3): 2023; 2024; 2026
- Wild card berths (1): 2025

Team data
- Name: Clearwater Threshers (2004–present)
- Previous names: Clearwater Phillies (1985–2003)
- Colors: Scarlet, indigo, navy, peach, sand, white
- Mascot: Phinley
- Ballpark: BayCare Ballpark (2004–present)
- Previous parks: Jack Russell Memorial Stadium (1985–2003)
- Owner/ Operator: Philadelphia Phillies
- General manager: Jason Adams
- Manager: Aaron Barrett
- Website: milb.com/clearwater

The Clearwater Threshers are a Minor League Baseball team of the Florida State League and the Single-A affiliate of the Philadelphia Phillies. They are located in Clearwater, Florida, and have played their home games at BayCare Ballpark since 2004. They previously played at Jack Russell Memorial Stadium from 1985 to 2003.

The team began play in 1985 as the Clearwater Phillies and were named for their Major League Baseball affiliate. Clearwater became the Threshers in 2004 when the team moved to the new Spectrum Field.

In conjunction with Major League Baseball's restructuring of Minor League Baseball in 2021, the Threshers were organized into the Low-A Southeast at the Low-A classification. In 2022, the Low-A Southeast became known as the Florida State League, the name historically used by the regional circuit prior to the 2021 reorganization, and was reclassified as a Single-A circuit.

== History ==
=== As the Clearwater Phillies ===
Clearwater city officials approached the Philadelphia Phillies as early as 1981 about locating a Phillies minor league affiliate at Jack Russell Stadium in Clearwater. In July 1982, in a visit to Philadelphia, Clearwater city officials and the president of the Florida State League again asked the Philadelphia Phillies about affiliating with a team to be based in Clearwater. The Amateur Softball Association Clearwater Bombers had long used Jack Russell Stadium during the summer months when the field would be reconfigured for softball. The placement of a minor league baseball team would mean the relocation of the Bombers.

The Florida State League granted the city of Clearwater a franchise on September 26, 1984. The Clearwater Phillies began play in 1985 after the Philadelphia Phillies ended their affiliation with their High Class A minor league team, the Carolina League Peninsula Pilots, based in Hampton, Virginia, and placed their new team at Jack Russell Stadium. The Philadelphia Phillies owned the franchise and named the club the Clearwater Phillies. The Clearwater Phillies played their first game on April 12, 1985, at home, against the Tampa Tarpons.

The club played as the Clearwater Phillies through the 2003 season. The Phillies planned to leave Jack Russell Memorial Stadium after the 2003 season to move into a new ballpark, BayCare Ballpark, adjacent to the Carpenter Complex, the Phillies' minor league training facility. With the move to the new ballpark, the Clearwater Phillies were renamed the "Threshers" and adopted a new team logo and colors.

=== Rebranding as the Threshers and Spectrum Field ===
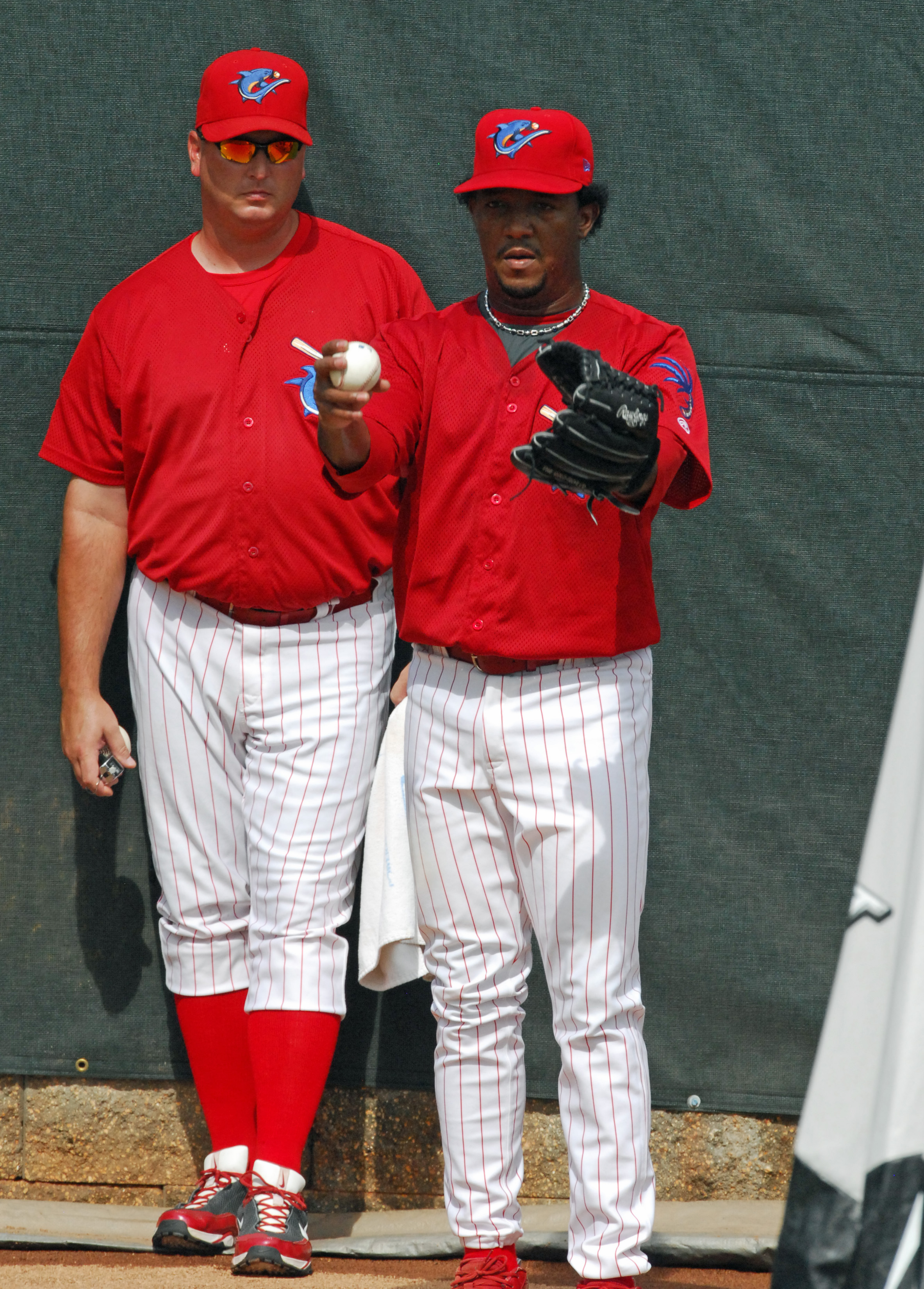
David Lundquist (left) and Pedro Martínez in the Thresher's bullpen in 2009

In 2004, the Clearwater Threshers were managed by former Phillies player and Hall of Famer, Mike Schmidt. Greg Legg managed the team in 2005 and 2006. Dave Huppert was the manager in 2007, and Razor Shines in 2008. Ernie Whitt was named the manager for the 2009 season after Shines was promoted to base coach for the New York Mets.

In 2007, the Threshers won the second half in the FSL West Division. They defeated the Sarasota Reds (2–1) in the FSL West Division Playoffs, then defeated the Brevard County Manatees 3 games to 1 in the FSL Championship Series (best-of-five) to win the FSL title. The Threshers were named MiLB.com's Class A Advanced Team of the Year.

A single-game attendance record of 9,090 was set on July 3, 2008.

On July 26, 2009, Pedro Martínez made a rehab start for the Threshers against the St. Lucie Mets at Spectrum Field. Martinez pitched 1 1/3 innings before rain caused the game to be canceled, wiping out the official record of his start. Martinez subsequently moved to the Lehigh Valley IronPigs for his next start.

On May 23, 2011, the Threshers gained national attention after playing in a 23-inning game against the Jupiter Hammerheads.

== Season-by-season ==
These statistics are current through the 2018 season.

=== Full season ===
Year	League	Division	Regular season					Postseason
Year	League	Division	Finish	Wins	Losses	Win%	GB	Postseason
Clearwater Phillies
1985	FSL	West	4th	69	72	.489	14	
1986	FSL	West	3rd	63	74	.460	25.5	
1987	FSL	West	3rd	66	70	.485	16	

=== Split season ===
League champions †	Finals appearance *	Division winner ^	Wild card berth ¤

Year	League	Division	Regular season										Postseason
Year	League	Division	1st half					2nd half					Postseason
Year	League	Division	Finish	Wins	Losses	Win%	GB	Finish	Wins	Losses	Win%	GB	Postseason
Clearwater Phillies
1988	FSL	West	5th	25	44	.362	9.5	5th	27	42	.391	13.5	
1989	FSL	West	4th	34	36	.486	6	5th	23	43	.348	17.5	
1990	FSL	West	5th	23	46	.333	17.5	5th	27	41	.397	13	
1991	FSL	West	1st ^	42	23	.646	—	1st ^	39	26	.600	—	Won semifinals (St. Lucie) 2–1; Lost finals (West Palm Beach) 0–2 *
1992	FSL	West	2nd	38	31	.551	12	2nd ¤	37	28	.569	4	Won quarterfinals (Dunedin) 2–0; Lost semifinals (Lakeland) 0–2
1993	FSL	West	1st ^	44	24	.647	—	5th	31	36	.463	13.5	Won semifinals (Charlotte) 2–1; Won finals (St. Lucie) 3–1 †
1994	FSL	West	5th	36	33	.522	9	3rd	36	29	.554	5.5	
1995	FSL	West	2nd	38	32	.543	3	2nd	41	27	.603	3	
1996	FSL	West	1st ^	44	26	.629	—	5th	31	36	.463	11.5	Won semifinals (Tampa) 2–0; Lost finals (St. Lucie) 1–3 *
1997	FSL	West	7th	31	38	.449	11.5	4th	39	30	.565	4.5	
1998	FSL	West	3rd	42	28	.600	4.5	2nd	40	30	.571	6.5	
1999	FSL	West	1st ^	46	23	.667	—	7th	31	36	.463	9.5	Lost semifinals (Dunedin) 1–2
2000	FSL	West	4th	37	33	.529	3.5	7th	27	38	.415	15.5	
2001	FSL	West	3rd	32	35	.478	2.5	4th	36	34	.514	11	
2002	FSL	West	6th	22	50	.306	21	3rd	35	29	.547	8	
2003	FSL	West	2nd	37	31	.544	6	2nd	35	30	.538	2.5	
Clearwater Threshers
2004	FSL	West	6th	25	45	.357	16	4th	30	36	.455	8.5	
2005	FSL	West	6th	17	50	.254	28	6th	24	45	.348	17.5	
2006	FSL	West	5th	31	38	.449	6.5	3rd	36	34	.514	6	
2007	FSL	West	3rd	39	31	.557	4	1st ^	44	26	.629	—	Won semifinals (Sarasota) 2–1; Won finals (Brevard County) 3–1 †
2008	FSL	West	6th	32	38	.457	13.5	5th	32	38	.457	17	
2009	FSL	North	4th	32	34	.485	9	4th	35	35	.500	14	
2010	FSL	North	3rd	37	33	.529	4	6th	30	39	.435	13	
2011	FSL	North	2nd	39	30	.565	7.5	3rd	36	33	.522	2.5	
2012	FSL	North	3rd	38	30	.559	5.5	3rd	36	30	.545	1	
2013	FSL	North	4th	35	33	.515	3	3rd	32	35	.578	11.5	
2014	FSL	North	6th	17	51	.250	28.5	4th	32	38	.457	10	
2015	FSL	North	1st ^	37	33	.529	—	1st ^	42	25	.627	—	Lost semifinals (Daytona) 0–2
2016	FSL	North	2nd	39	29	.574	2.5	2nd	43	25	.632	1	
2017	FSL	North	2nd	38	32	.543	1	4th	29	39	.426	18.5	
2018	FSL	North	4th	32	36	.471	6	1st ^	45	24	.652	—	Lost semifinals (Daytona) 0–2

since 2019

Year	League	Division	Regular season					Postseason
Year	League	Division	Finish	Wins	Losses	Win%	GB	Postseason
Clearwater Threshers
2019	FSL	West	6th	68	68	.500		Postseason canceled due to Hurricane Dorian
2020	FSL	West	Season cancelled due to COVID-19 pandemic					
2021	FSL	West	9th	52	64	.448		
2022	FSL	West	9th	57	71	.445		
2023	FSL	West	1st	79	50	.543		Lost finals (Jupiter) 1–2
2024	FSL	West	4th	64	63	.504		
2025	FSL	West	2nd	68	60	.531		Lost Semifinals (Lakeland) 0-2

Statistic	Wins	Losses	Win %
Regular season record (1985–2018)	2,384	2,389	.499
Postseason record (1985–2017)	18	20	.474
All-time regular and postseason record	2,402	2,409	.499

== Roster ==
Clearwater Threshers roster
Players	Coaches/Other
Pitchers: 18 Wilmer Blanco; 28 Tyler Bowen; 21 Cody Bowker; 38 Tegan Cain; 17 Gabe Craig; 44 Marty Gair; 54 Cole Gilley; 29 Tanner Gresham; 9 Peyton Havard; 46 Ramon Marquez; 47 MT Morrissey; 43 Cade Obermueller; 51 Brad Pacheco; 35 Jacob Pruitt; 26 James Tallon †; 29 Giussepe Velasquez; 27 Brian Walters; 16 Kevin Warunek #; 55 Sean Youngerman; 13 Zuher Yousuf; Catchers: 7 Alirio Ferrebus; 49 Angel Mata; 10 Will Vierling; Infielders: 52 Nolan Beltran; 3 Matthew Ferrara; 6 Robert Phelps; 2 Juan Villavicenio; Outfielders: 24 Griffin Burkholder; 40 Victor Cardoza; 4 Jonathan Hogart; 23 Nathan Humphreys; 19 TJayy Walton	Manager: 30 Aaron Barrett; Coaches: 48 Alex Concepcion (assistant pitching); 33 Matt Ellmyer (pitching); 41 Chris Heintz (hitting); 8 Desmond Jennings (assistant hitting); 22 Shawn Williams (bench); 60-day injured list: -- Kleyderve Andrade; -- Kyler Carmack; 45 Richie Cortese; -- Yhoan Escalona; -- Jonathan Gonzalez; 40 Orlando Gonzalez; -- Naoel Mejia; -- Cesar Mujica; -- Zack Tukis; 7-day injured list; * On Philadelphia Phillies 40-man roster; ~ Development list; # Rehab assignment; ∞ Reserve list; ‡ Restricted list; § Suspended list; † Temporarily inactive list; Roster updated June 19, 2026; Transactions; → More rosters: MiLB • Florida State League; → Philadelphia Phillies minor league players

== Notable Clearwater Phillies and Threshers alumni ==
Baseball Hall of Fame alumni

- Pedro Martinez (2009) inducted, 2015
- Mike Schmidt (2004, MGR) inducted, 1995
- Jim Thome (2005, 2012) inducted, 2018
- Scott Rolen (1995) Inducted, 2023

Other notable alumni

- Philippe Aumont
- Ricky Bottalico (1993) MLB All-Star
- Jeff Brantley (2000) MLB All-Star
- Pat Burrell (1998)
- Paul Byrd (2001) MLB All-Star
- Drew Carpenter (2007)
- Carlos Carrasco
- Danny Cox (1991)
- Darren Daulton (1987, 1996) 3× MLB All-Star
- Johnny Estrada (1999) MLB All-Star
- Tom Gordon (2006–2008) 3× MLB All-Star
- Jason Grimsley (1988)
- Cole Hamels (2003-2006, 2014) 4× MLB All-Star; 2008 World Series Most Valuable Player
- J. A. Happ (2006, 2010)
- Von Hayes (1990) MLB All-Star
- Ryan Howard (2003) 3× MLB All-Star; 2005 NL Rookie of the Year; 2006 NL Most Valuable Player
- Kyle Kendrick (2005–2006)
- Scott Kingery (2016)
- Cliff Lee (2014) 4× MLB All-Star; 2008 Cy Young Award
- Mike Lieberthal (1991) 2× MLB All-Star
- Chuck McElroy (1987)
- Scott Mathieson
- Mickey Morandini (1989) MLB All-Star
- Nick Punto (1999)
- Elizardo Ramirez
- Chris Roberson
- Jimmy Rollins (1998, 2008, 2010) 3× MLB All-Star; 2007 NL Most Valuable Player
- Curt Schilling (1996, 2000) 6× MLB All-Star; 2001 World Series Most Valuable Player
- Michael Schwimer
- Carlos Silva (2000)
- Alfredo Simón MLB All-Star
- Chase Utley (2001, 2010–2012) 6× MLB All-Star
- Jayson Werth (2007–2008) MLB All-Star
- Luke Williams
- Mitch Williams (1996) MLB All-Star
- Randy Wolf (2003, 2006) MLB All-Star
- Mike Zagurski

== Former coaches and trainers ==
- Mike Schmidt (manager – 2004) W-L: 55–81
- Greg Legg (manager 2005–2006) W-L: 108–167
- Dave Huppert (manager 2007) W-L: 83–57 / League Champions
- Razor Shines (manager 2008) W-L: 64–76
- Dan Roberts (hitting coach 2004–2005)
- Greg Gross (hitting coach 2006)
- Brad Komminsk (hitting coach 2007)
- Steve Schrenk (pitching coach 2004 and 2007–2008)
