= Dustin Tatro =

American musician and composer, stadium organist for the Texas Rangers

- Occupation: Organist • Radio Personality • Church Musician
- Organization(s): Texas Rangers, MLB
- Title: Official Organist, Texas Rangers & Globe Life Field Organist/Choirmaster, St. Andrew's Anglican Church, Breckenridge, Texas Station Manager/OM/PD/On-Air Host, Radio Abilene
- Website: TEXOrganGuy.com theRockDownShow.com

Dustin Tatro is an American musician who was the stadium organist for Major League Baseball's Texas Rangers. He was ousted in 2024.

Tatro serves as organist and choirmaster at St. Andrew's Anglican Church in Breckenridge, Texas, and is also a 20-year radio personality currently serving as station and operations manager as well as chief engineer for Radio Abilene, hosting middays on 106.3 The Raider. Formerly, Tatro hosted middays for Q Country 96.1 (KORQ) and a late-night rock program on KGNZ. He was also the creator and host of a globally-syndicated weekly radio show called The RockDown Show with Dustin Tatro, which featured artist interviews and the weekly top ten songs in Christian Rock. He also holds certification as a Texas EMT.

Tatro worked for the Texas Rangers from 2020 to 2024. He was the first official organist of the Rangers since Marcia Rogers left in 2001 after playing since the opening of Globe Life Park in Arlington in 1994. He got the job when Chuck Morgan, Executive Vice President for Ballpark Entertainment, saw videos Tatro had posted on social media while rehearsing for a major pipe organ recital and reached out to invite him to become organist for the Rangers.

Beginning with the 2020 Major League Baseball season, the Texas Rangers began playing at Globe Life Field, which, as of September 2021, does not have an organ installed. For the 2020 season, Tatro recorded approximately 750 pieces of organ music on a refurbished 1951 Hammond C2 organ that he acquired from the storage of a local Baptist church. He also recorded some songs on the 2,800-pipe Garland organ at St. Paul UMC Abilene, where he was the organist from 2014-2022. Like many other stadium organists, Tatro takes requests on social media.

In March 2024 Tatro announced that he was no longer with The Texas Rangers stating he had been replaced by an electric guitar. In May 2024 he hinted he would begin playing the organ for Abilene's newly founded Mid American League Team, The Flying Bison.

== Personal life ==
Tatro is from Andrews, Texas, and has lived in Abilene since 2009. He holds undergraduate and masters degrees in church music, with organ and choral conducting emphases, from Hardin-Simmons University. He is an Episcopalian and a member of the Association of Anglican Musicians. He is married to Staci Armstrong.
