= Oligoamenorrhea =

More frequent menstruation

- Other names: Oligoamenorrhoea Oligoamenorrhœa; Irregular infrequent periods; Irregular infrequent menstrual bleeding; Irregular infrequent menstruation; Oligomenorrhea/amenorrhea
- Specialty: Gynecology

Oligoamenorrhea, also known as irregular infrequent periods or irregular infrequent menstrual bleeding, is a collective term to refer to both oligomenorrhea (infrequent periods) and amenorrhea (absence of periods). It is a menstrual disorder in which menstrual bleeding occurs on an infrequent and irregular basis. Menstrual intervals are 37 to 180 days in oligoamenorrhea. Nearly 90% of women with oligoamenorrhea have polyendocrine metabolic ovarian syndrome (PMOS).
