= Carl-Henry Alström =

Swedish psychiatrist

- Born: 3 May 1907; Västerås, Sweden
- Died: December 31, 1993 (aged 86); Sweden
- Known for: Description of Alström syndrome
- Scientific career
- Fields: Psychiatrist
- Workplaces: Institute for Human Genetics, Uppsala; Karolinska Institute

Carl-Henry Alström (3 May 1907 – 31 December 31 1993) was a Swedish psychiatrist who described the syndrome now named for him, Alström syndrome, a hereditary disorder that characteristically includes obesity in childhood, nerve deafness, and retinal degeneration (due to atypical retinitis pigmentosa).
