= TD Ballpark =

Baseball field in Dunedin, Florida, US

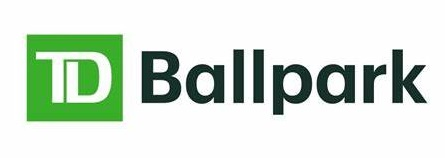

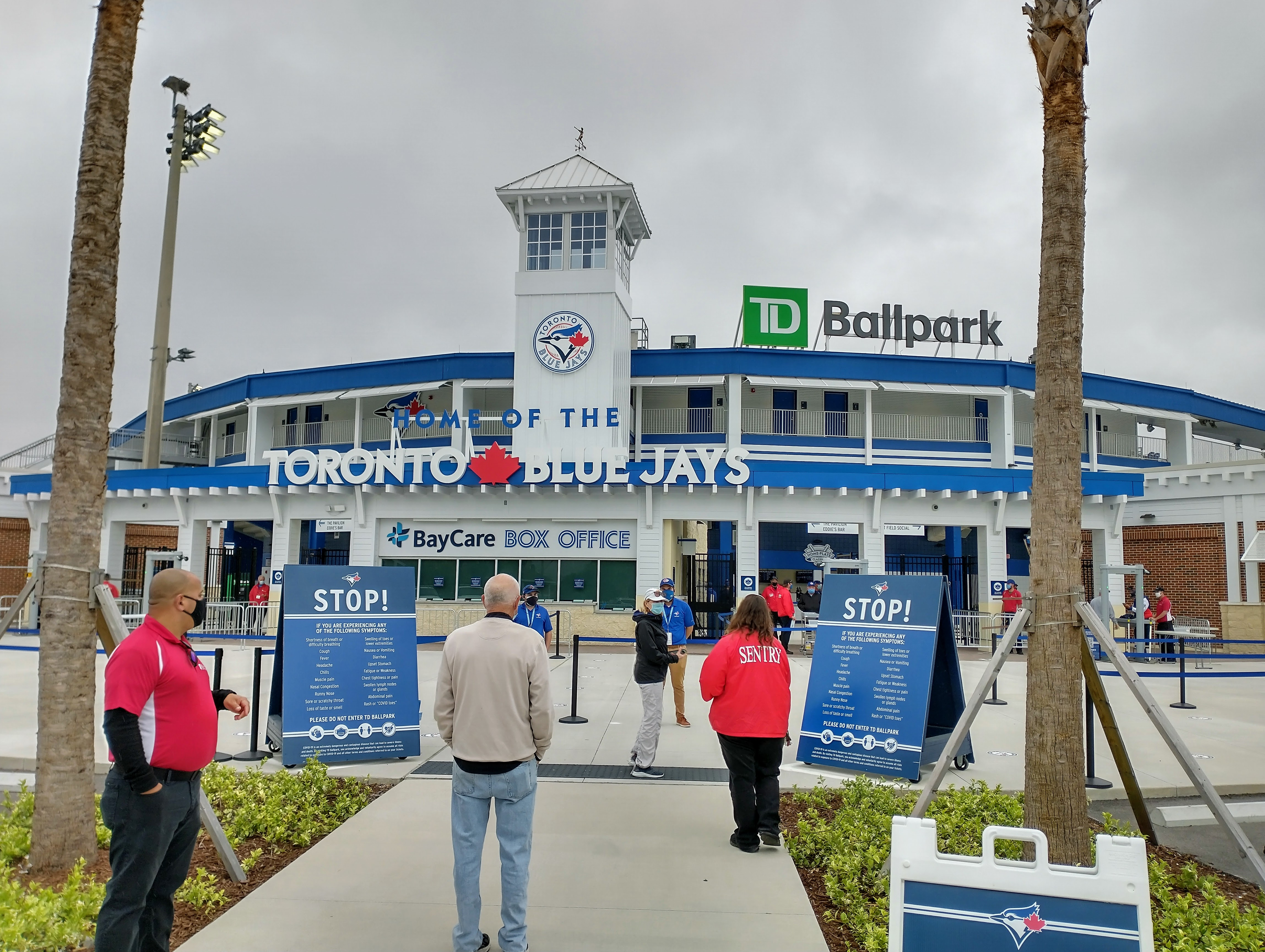
- Entrance to TD Ballpark
- Interactive map of TD Ballpark
- Former names: Dunedin Stadium at Grant Field; Knology Park (2004–2008); Florida Auto Exchange Stadium (2010–2017); Dunedin Stadium (2018)
- Location: 373 Douglas Avenue #A; Dunedin, FL 34698
- Coordinates: 28°0′13″N 82°47′11″W
- Owner: City of Dunedin Parks & Recreation Department
- Operator: City of Dunedin Parks & Recreation Department
- Capacity: 8,500 (2020-present); 5,509 (2005–2019); 6,106 (1999–2004); 6,218 (1990–1998)
- Surface: Grass
- Field size: Left Field – 333 ft Left-Center – 380 ft Center Field – 400 ft Right-Center – 363 ft Right Field – 336 ft

Construction
- Groundbreaking: September 1, 1989
- Opened: March 1, 1990
- Cost: $2.4 million ($5.91 million in 2025 dollars)
- Architect: Johnston Dana Associates
- General contractor: Case Contracting Company

Tenants
- Toronto Blue Jays (MLB) 1990–present (Spring training); April–May 2021 (Regular season); Dunedin Blue Jays (FSL) 1990–present Dunedin High School Falcons baseball

TD Ballpark, originally Dunedin Stadium at Grant Field, is a baseball stadium located in Dunedin, Florida. The stadium was built in 1990 and holds 8,500 people. It is the spring training home of the Toronto Blue Jays, as well as home field of their Single-A affiliate, the Dunedin Blue Jays of the Florida State League and the Dunedin High School Falcons baseball team.

Built in 1990 on the site of the former Grant Field, the stadium underwent a comprehensive renovation in 2019–2020 at a cost of approximately $102 million. Due to border restrictions during the Covid-19 pandemic, the stadium served as the Toronto Blue Jays' temporary regular-season home venue for the first two months of the 2021 Major League Baseball season. The stadium has also been known as Knology Park (2004–2008) and Florida Auto Exchange Stadium (2010–2017).

== History ==
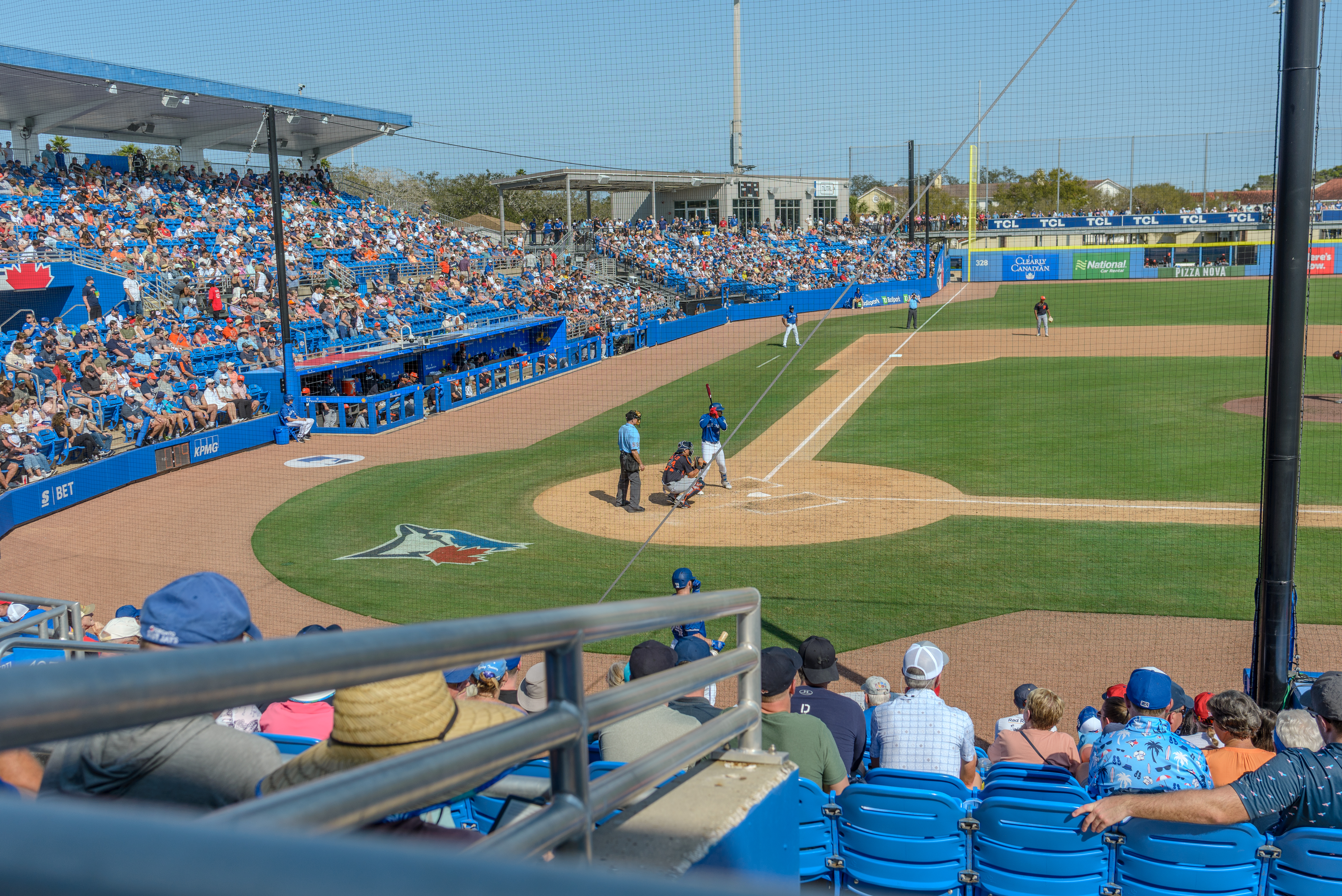
Blue Jays Spring Training at TD Ballpark in 2025

From 1977 to 1989, the Blue Jays played at Grant Field, which had a seating capacity of 3,417. Grant Field opened in 1930 and was named after the mayor of Dunedin Albert J. Grant (served 1927–1928), who had donated the land.

The Toronto Blue Jays established their spring training operations in Dunedin during their inaugural season in 1977. The team played their first exhibition game at the venue on March 11, 1977, defeating the New York Mets 3–1.

In 1990, at a cost of approximately $2.4 million, the City of Dunedin built a new stadium called Dunedin Stadium at the same location as Grant Field. It had a capacity of 6,106. The actual playing field and team clubhouses did not change.

In the fall of 2000, the Toronto Blue Jays signed an agreement to remain in Dunedin for an additional 15 years pending a $12-million renovation. The state of Florida paid $6 million, Pinellas County $3 million, and the Jays and Dunedin paid the remainder for the renovations. The agreement took effect in March 2002. Part of the renovations have included a new two-story building that includes a clubhouse, training room, weight room, and office space that was built next to the stadium. The most recent renovations at Dunedin Stadium include remodeled restrooms and replacement of the grandstand seats.

In February 1995, during the Major League Baseball strike, the Blue Jays considered holding regular season games at Dunedin Stadium if the regular season began with replacement players. Ontario law forbade the Blue Jays from using replacement players in Toronto. American League officials inspected the ballpark on February 21, 1995 in response to the club's request to host games in Dunedin. The strike ended in March 1995 and no regular season games were played at the park.

Dunedin Stadium was once ranked by Sports Illustrated as one of the top five facilities to watch a Major League Baseball Spring training game. Dunedin has been the only spring home for the Toronto Blue Jays since their inception in 1977.

The current park capacity is 5,509 individual seats and features include a press box level with air-conditioned skyboxes, three picnic areas, two air-conditioned rooms, a scoreboard with electronic message display, regulation-sized Major League playing field and lighting, two half-fields (one natural grass and one artificial turf), batting tunnels, and full concession capabilities. In addition, the administrative offices feature an executive boardroom, dining room and kitchen, classroom, clubhouse and workout and training facilities.

Before Spring Training began in 2021, the Blue Jays announced that the team would begin the 2021 regular season at TD Ballpark. The team cited the restriction of non-essential travel between the United States and Canada due to the COVID-19 pandemic as the reason for the decision. The team played 21 games in Dunedin before shifting to Sahlen Field in Buffalo, New York, which had been their home for the entirety of the 2020 season.

=== Renovation ===
The Blue Jays lease of the facility ran through 2017; however, they held the option to extend it by an additional five years twice. After investigating possible alternative sites to host their spring training facility, the team negotiated an $81 million renovation to the stadium ($33.3 million) and Englebert Complex ($47.8 million) in 2014 under which they would contribute $20 million (plus any cost overruns) with the rest coming from the state ($13.7 million), county ($41.7 million) and city ($5.6 million) governments. The project was designed by the architectural firm Populous and managed by Gilbane Building Company.

The club retains all revenue from sales at concessions and parking at the stadium, while they share revenue from naming rights with the city. The new lease agreement for the stadium lasts for 25 years, with the option to renew for a further 2 years five times. The City Commission approved the deal in November 2017, while the county agreed to approve a funding request for the project in April 2018. By September 2019 the budget for the renovation had increased to $102 million, with the team investing an extra $20 million and the city contributing $530,000.

Groundbreaking took place in April 2019, the stadium officially reopened on February 24, 2020, in time for the Jays' 2020 spring training. The stadium's capacity was expanded from 5,500 to 8,500, with 6,500 fixed seats.

== Naming rights ==
The stadium has operated under several corporate naming rights agreements:

- Knology Park (2004–2008): A naming agreement with Knology, a communications company, expired on September 30, 2008.
- Florida Auto Exchange Stadium (2010–2017): On November 7, 2010, the City of Dunedin announced that it had reached a 7-year, $181,000 agreement with the Florida Auto Exchange, a Dunedin car sales center, for the naming rights of Dunedin Stadium. The facility was renamed "Florida Auto Exchange Stadium" until October 1, 2017 when the agreement expired.
- TD Ballpark (2019–present): In November 2019, the Jays announced that TD Bank had acquired naming rights for the renovated stadium, which would be renamed TD Ballpark.

== 2021 Major League Baseball season ==
Due to international border restrictions imposed by the Canadian government during the COVID-19 pandemic, the Toronto Blue Jays were unable to begin the 2021 regular season at the Rogers Centre in Toronto. The team utilized TD Ballpark as their home venue for April and May 2021.

The Blue Jays played 21 regular-season home games at the stadium, compiling a record of 10–11. Notable events included the home opener against the Los Angeles Angels on April 8, 2021. Citing the Florida summer heat and frequent rain, the team relocated their home operations to Sahlen Field in Buffalo, New York, starting in June 2021.
