= 2026 Rice Owls baseball team =

American college baseball season

2026 Rice Owls baseball
- Conference: American Conference
- Record: 35–24 (16–11 American)
- Head coach: David Pierce (2nd season)
- Assistant coaches: J.J. Altobelli (1st season); Mikey Hoehner (1st season); Conrad Ramquist (1st season)
- Hitting coach: Clay Van Hook (1st season)
- Pitching coach: Justin Aspegren (3rd season)
- Home stadium: Reckling Park

2026 American Conference baseball standings
	Conf.						Overall
Team	W		L		T	PCT	W		L		T	PCT
UTSA ‍†‍‍	17	–	10	–	0	.630	38	–	20	–	0	.655
East Carolina ‍†‍‡‍^{y}	17	–	10	–	0	.630	36	–	22	–	1	.619
Rice ‍‍‍	16	–	11	–	0	.593	35	–	24	–	0	.593
UAB ‍‍‍	15	–	12	–	0	.556	32	–	26	–	0	.552
Memphis ‍‍‍	13	–	14	–	0	.481	24	–	34	–	0	.414
Florida Atlantic ‍‍‍	12	–	15	–	0	.444	28	–	28	–	0	.500
Wichita State ‍‍‍	12	–	15	–	0	.444	31	–	29	–	0	.517
Charlotte ‍‍‍	12	–	15	–	0	.444	28	–	28	–	0	.500
South Florida ‍‍‍	11	–	16	–	0	.407	32	–	21	–	0	.604
Tulane ‍‍‍	10	–	17	–	0	.370	25	–	31	–	0	.446
† – Conference champion ‡ – Tournament champion y – Invited to the NCAA tournament As of May 26, 2026; Rankings from D1Baseball

The 2026 Rice Owls baseball team represents Rice University during the 2026 NCAA Division I baseball season. The Owls play their home games at Reckling Park as a member of the American Conference. They are be led by second-year head coach David Pierce.

== Previous season ==
The Owls are coming off a 17–40 (10–17) season, which saw head coach, José Cruz Jr. fired mid-season. The Owls did not qualify for the conference tournament.

== Preseason ==
=== Coaches poll ===
The coaches poll was released on December 30, 2025. Rice was selected to finish seventh in the conference.

Coaches' Poll
Predicted finish	Team	Points
1	East Carolina	75 (4)
2	UTSA	70 (4)
3	Charlotte	62
4	Tulane	57
5	South Florida	54
6	Florida Atlantic	45
7	Rice	45
8	Wichita State	24
9	Memphis	19
10	UAB	16

== Game log ==
2026 Rice Owls baseball game log (35–24)
Preseason: 3–1 (Home: 1–1; Away: 2–0; Neutral: 0–0)

Preseason: 3–1 (Home: 1–1; Away: 2–0; Neutral: 0–0)
Date	TV	Opponent	Rank	Stadium	Score	Win	Loss	Save	Attendance	Preseason	Amer.
October 11		at Louisiana*		Russo Park; Lafayette, LA	**W** 6–4				2,563	1–0	—
October 11		at Louisiana*		Russo Park	**W** 6–5				2,714	2–0	—
October 26		McLennan CC		Reckling Park; Houston, TX	**L** 2–3	Bowers	**Urbanczyk**	Doty	875	2–1	—
October 26		McLennan CC		Reckling Park	**W** 5–3	**Sanders**	Stribling	**Fernandez**	894	3–1	—
January 31		Rice Alumni		Reckling Park					933		—

Regular season: 34–22 (Home: 20–10; Away: 13–11; Neutral: 1–1)

February: 5–6 (Home: 5–3; Away: 0–3; Neutral: 0–0)
Date	TV	Opponent	Rank	Stadium	Score	Win	Loss	Save	Attendance	Overall	Amer.
February 13	ESPN+	Northwestern*		Reckling Park; Houston, TX	**W** 7–6	**Sharp** (1–0)	Hliboki (0–1)	**Sanders** (1)	1,627	1–0	—
February 14	ESPN+	Northwestern*		Reckling Park	**W** 3–2	**Arnett** (1–0)	Kouser (0–1)	**Wiggins** (1)	1,627	2–0	—
February 15	ESPN+	Northwestern*		Reckling Park	**L** 6–17	Kouser (1–1)	**Diaz** (0–1)	—	1,334	2–1	—
February 17		Louisiana*		Reckling Park	**L** 0–3	Pruitt (1–0)	**Blank** (0–1)	Brasch (1)	1,327	2–2	—
February 18	ESPN+	Purdue*		Reckling Park	**W** 5–2	**Arnett** (2–0)	Klug (1–1)	**Thames** (1)	1,315	3–2	—
February 20	B1G+	at USC*		Dedeaux Field; Los Angeles, CA	**L** 0–5	Edwards (2–0)	**Sharp** (1–1)	Lauridsen (1)	1,118	3–3	—
February 21	B1G+	at USC*		Dedeaux Field	**L** 1–4	Govel (2–0)	**Urbanczyk** (0–1)	Troy (3)	1,097	3–4	—
February 22	B1G+	at USC*		Dedeaux Field	**L** 2–4	Johnson (2–0)	**Sanders** (0–1)	Troy (4)	1,265	3–5	—
February 24	ESPN+	Houston Christian*		Reckling Park	**L** 8–11	Norton (1–0)	**Thames** (0–1)	Feltman (1)	1,342	3–6	—
February 27	ESPN+	Harvard*		Reckling Park	**W** 11–7	**Sharp** (2–1)	Colasante (0–2)	**Fuentes** (1)	1,908	4–6	—
February 28	ESPN+	Harvard*		Reckling Park	**W** 2–1	**Diaz** (1–1)	McHugh (0–1)	**Atchley** (1)	1,493	5–6	—

March: 13–6 (Home: 5–1; Away: 7–4; Neutral: 1–1)
Date	TV	Opponent	Rank	Stadium	Score	Win	Loss	Save	Attendance	Overall	Amer.
March 1	ESPN+	Harvard*		Reckling Park	**W** 9–0	**Sanders** (1–1)	Abler (0–1)	—	1,363	6–6	—
March 4	ESPN+	at Lamar*		Vincent–Beck Stadium; Beaumont, TX	**W** 4–1	**Fuentes** (1–0)	Fritcher (0–1)	**Thames** (2)	961	7–6	—
March 6		at Abilene Christian*		Crutcher Scott Field; Abilene, TX	**W** 5–4	**Diaz** (2–1)	Whiteaker (1–2)	**Wiggins** (2)	443	8–6	—
March 7		at Abilene Christian*		Crutcher Scott Field	**W** 8–6	**Thames** (1–1)	Coe (0–1)	—	401	9–6	—
March 8	WACI	at Abilene Christian*		Crutcher Scott Field	**L** 1–4	McGarrh (2–1)	**Sanders** (1–2)	Wallace (1)	408	9–7	—
March 10	B12N+	at Houston*		Schroeder Park; Houston, TX	**L** 1–13^{(8)}	Cooper (1–0)	Arnett (2–1)	—	1,024	9–8	—
March 13		vs. St. Mary's (CA)*		Brazzell Field; Phoenix, AZ	**W** 6–5	**Traeger** (1–0)	Gardini (0–2)	—	101	10–8	—
March 13	MWN	at Grand Canyon*		Brazzell Field	**W** 16–5	**Diaz** (3–1)	Ahern (1–3)	—	336	11–8	—
March 14	MWN	at Grand Canyon*		Brazzell Field	**W** 13–2	**Urbanczyk** (1–1)	Frey (0–4)	—	251	12–8	—
March 15		vs. St. Mary's (CA)*		Brazzell Field	**L** 8–11	Romero (1–0)	**Atchley** (0–1)	—	106	12–9	—
March 17	ESPN+	UTRGV*		Reckling Park	**W** 7–3	**Atchley** (1–1)	Vercoe (0–3)	—	1,371	13–9	—
March 20	ESPN+	at South Florida		Red McEwen Field; Tampa, FL	**W** 5–4	**Wiggins** (1–0)	Alicea (4–1)	**Atchley** (2)	675	14–9	1–0
March 21	ESPN+	at South Florida		Red McEwen Field	**L** 0–2	Senay (4–0)	**Urbanczyk** (1–2)	Sutton (4)	568	14–10	1–1
March 22	ESPN+	at South Florida		Red McEwen Field	**L** 2–7	Smith (3–1)	**Sanders** (1–3)	—	534	14–11	1–2
March 25	ESPN+	at Houston Christian*		Husky Field; Houston, TX	**W** 10–7	**Atchley** (2–1)	Kendall (0–2)	—	377	15–11	—
March 27	ESPN+	Florida Atlantic		Reckling Park	**L** 2–6	Litman (4–2)	**Wiggins** (1–1)	Kilny (1)	1,429	15–12	1–3
March 28	ESPN+	Florida Atlantic		Reckling Park	**W** 5–2	**Thames** (2–1)	Adetuyi (1–2)	—	1,620	16–12	2–3
March 29	ESPN+	Florida Atlantic		Reckling Park	**W** 8–1	**Urbanczyk** (2–2)	Grant (1–2)	—	1,293	17–12	3–3
March 31	ESPN+	UTRGV*		Reckling Park	**W** 6–4	**Atchley** (3–1)	Gonzalez (0–1)	**Arnett** (1)	1,202	18–12	—

April: 6–10 (Home: 1–4; Away: 5–6; Neutral: 0–0)
Date	TV	Opponent	Rank	Stadium	Score	Win	Loss	Save	Attendance	Overall	Amer.
April 2	ESPN+	UTSA		Reckling Park	**W** 3–2^{(10)}	**Sharp** (3–1)	Simmons (6–2)	—	1,519	19–12	4–3
April 3	ESPN+	UTSA		Reckling Park	**L** 0–8	Myles (4–1)	**Sanders** (1–4)	—	1,476	19–13	4–4
April 4	ESPN+	UTSA		Reckling Park	**L** 0–13^{(7)}	Gutierrez (1–0)	**Thames** (2–2)	—	1,516	19–14	4–5
April 7	ESPN+	Texas A&M–Corpus Christi*		Reckling Park	**W** 18–4	**Atchley** (4–1)	Shea (1–3)	—	1,543	20–14	—
April 10	ESPN+	at Charlotte		Hayes Stadium; Charlotte, NC	**W** 7–5	**Wiggins** (2–1)	Cooper (3–2)	—	607	21–14	5–5
April 11	ESPN+	at Charlotte		Hayes Stadium	**W** 6–2	**Sanders** (2–4)	Taylor (4–4)	**Thames** (3)	659	22–14	6–5
April 12	ESPN+	at Charlotte		Hayes Stadium	**W** 3–2	**Urbanczyk** (3–2)	Carson (2–2)	**Thames** (4)	674	23–14	7–5
April 15	ESPN+	Sam Houston*		Reckling Park	**W** 5–3	**Atchley** (5–1)	Alarid (0–2)	**Blank** (1)	1,336	24–14	—
April 17	ESPN+	Memphis		Reckling Park	**L** 1–4	Howell (4–5)	**Sharp** (3–2)	Fair (7)	1,808	24–15	7–6
April 18	ESPN+	Memphis		Reckling Park	**L** 6–10	Case (3–6)	**Sanders** (2–5)	Fair (8)	1,534	24–16	7–7
April 19	ESPN+	Memphis		Reckling Park	**L** 5–6^{(10)}	Rushing (1–2)	**Thames** (2–3)	—	1,579	24–17	7–8
April 21	ESPN+	Houston*		Reckling Park	**L** 3–4	Roman (2–0)	**Blank** (0–2)	—	2,258	24–18	—
April 24	ESPN+	at Wichita State		Eck Stadium; Wichita, KS	**L** 1–5	Cuccias (4–2)	**Wiggins** (2–2)	—	2,621	24–19	7–9
April 25	ESPN+	at Wichita State		Eck Stadium	**W** 3–2	**Sanders** (3–5)	Sharp (0–2)	**Thames** (5)	1,689	25–19	8–9
April 26	ESPN+	at Wichita State		Eck Stadium	**L** 3–13	Hayashi (1–1)	**Urbanczyk** (3–3)	—	1,433	25–20	8–10
April 28	ESPN+	Lamar*		Reckling Park	**W** 6–5	**Diaz** (4–1)	Fritcher (3–4)	**Sharp** (1)	1,642	26–20	—

May: 8–2 (Home: 6–0; Away: 2–2; Neutral: 0–0)
Date	TV	Opponent	Rank	Stadium	Score	Win	Loss	Save	Attendance	Overall	Amer.
May 1	ESPN+	UAB		Reckling Park	**W** 16–9	**Wiggins** (3–2)	Ingram (2–4)	—	1,867	27–20	9–10
May 1	ESPN+	UAB		Reckling Park	**W** 12–2^{(7)}	**Sanders** (4–5)	Samuelson (4–3)	—	1,867	28–20	10–10
May 3	ESPN+	UAB		Reckling Park	**W** 10–3	**Urbanczyk** (4–3)	Hicks (2–4)	—	1,323	29–20	11–10
May 8	ESPN+	at East Carolina		Clark–LeClair Stadium; Greenville, NC	**W** 10–5	**Sharp** (4–2)	Webb (6–5)	—	4,173	30–20	12–10
May 9	ESPN+	at East Carolina		Clark–LeClair Stadium	**W** 5–3	**Sanders** (5–5)	Norby (5–3)	**Thames** (6)	4,462	31–20	13–10
May 10	ESPN+	at East Carolina		Clark–LeClair Stadium	**L** 0–3	Rose (3–1)	**Urbanczyk** (4–4)	Hoagland (1)	4,087	31–21	13–11
May 12	B12N+	at Houston*		Schroeder Park	**L** 3–14	Solis (3–2)	**Arnett** (2–2)	—	849	31–22	—
May 14	ESPN+	Tulane		Reckling Park	**W** 12–0^{(7)}	**Wiggins** (4–2)	Rodriguez (5–3)	—	1,835	32–22	14–11
May 15	ESPN+	Tulane		Reckling Park	**W** 10–6	**Thames** (3–3)	Larson (2–3)	—	1,738	33–22	15–11
May 16	ESPN+	Tulane		Reckling Park	**W** 6–5^{(11)}	**Kuhn** (1–0)	Devenney (0–1)	—	1,424	34–22	16–11

Postseason: 1–2 (Home: 0–0; Away: 0–0; Neutral: 1–2)

American tournament: 1–2 (Home: 0–0; Away: 0–0; Neutral: 1–2)
Date	TV	Opponent	Rank	Stadium	Score	Win	Loss	Save	Attendance	Overall	ACT Record	Source
May 21	ESPN+	vs. (7) Wichita State	(3)	BayCare Ballpark; Clearwater, FL	**W** 5–4	**Fetchel** (1–0)	Hamilton (3–8)	—		35–22	1–0	Report
May 22	ESPN+	vs. (2) East Carolina	(3)	BayCare Ballpark	**L** 3–4	Towers (7–3)	**Sanders** (5–6)	Norby (1)		35–23	1–1	Report
May 22	ESPN+	vs. (4) UAB	(3)	BayCare Ballpark	**L** 6–9	Miller (5–0)	**Thames** (3–4)	—		35–24	1–2	Report

Legend: = Win = Loss = Canceled
Bold = Rice team member
Rankings are based on the team's current ranking in the D1Baseball poll.

Schedule Notes

== Rankings ==
Ranking movements Legend: — = Not ranked
	Week																		
Poll	Pre	1	2	3	4	5	6	7	8	9	10	11	12	13	14	15	16	17	Final
Coaches'	—	—*	—	—	—	—	—	—											
Baseball America	—	—	—	—	—	—	—	—											
NCBWA†	—	—	—	—	—	—	—	—											
D1Baseball	—	—	—	—	—	—	—	—											
Perfect Game	—	—	—	—	—	—	—	—											

† NCBWA ranks 30 teams in their preseason poll, but only ranks 25 teams weekly during the season.
* A new poll was not released for this week, so for comparison purposes, the previous week's ranking is inserted in this week's slot.
