= American Athletic Conference Tournament =

American Athletic Conference Championship or American Athletic Conference Tournament may refer to:

- American Athletic Conference men's basketball tournament, men's basketball championship
- American Athletic Conference women's basketball tournament, women's basketball championship
- American Athletic Conference baseball tournament, baseball championship
- American Athletic Conference Football Championship Game, college football championship
