= 2026 East Carolina Pirates baseball team =

American college baseball season

2026 East Carolina Pirates baseball

American regular season co-champions American tournament champions

NCAA Chapel Hill Regional, 2–2
- Conference: American Conference
- Record: 38–24–1 (17–10 American)
- Head coach: Cliff Godwin (12th season)
- Assistant coaches: Jeff Palumbo (11th season); Thomas Francisco (2nd season); Bryant Packard (2nd season)
- Hitting coach: Jake Gautreau (2nd season)
- Pitching coach: Austin Knight (6th season)
- Home stadium: Clark–LeClair Stadium

2026 American Conference baseball standings
	Conf.						Overall
Team	W		L		T	PCT	W		L		T	PCT
UTSA ‍†‍‍	17	–	10	–	0	.630	38	–	20	–	0	.655
East Carolina ‍†‍‡‍^{y}	17	–	10	–	0	.630	36	–	22	–	1	.619
Rice ‍‍‍	16	–	11	–	0	.593	35	–	24	–	0	.593
UAB ‍‍‍	15	–	12	–	0	.556	32	–	26	–	0	.552
Memphis ‍‍‍	13	–	14	–	0	.481	24	–	34	–	0	.414
Florida Atlantic ‍‍‍	12	–	15	–	0	.444	28	–	28	–	0	.500
Wichita State ‍‍‍	12	–	15	–	0	.444	31	–	29	–	0	.517
Charlotte ‍‍‍	12	–	15	–	0	.444	28	–	28	–	0	.500
South Florida ‍‍‍	11	–	16	–	0	.407	32	–	21	–	0	.604
Tulane ‍‍‍	10	–	17	–	0	.370	25	–	31	–	0	.446
† – Conference champion ‡ – Tournament champion y – Invited to the NCAA tournament As of May 26, 2026; Rankings from D1Baseball

The 2026 East Carolina Pirates baseball team represents East Carolina University during the 2026 NCAA Division I baseball season. The Pirates play their home games at Clark–LeClair Stadium as a member of the American Conference. They are be led by twelfth-year head coach Cliff Godwin.

== Previous season ==
The Pirates are coming off a 35–27 (13–14) season, where they qualified for and won the 2025 American Athletic Conference baseball tournament as the sixth-overall seed, where they went 4–0. The Pirates earned an automatic berth into the 2025 NCAA Division I baseball tournament, where they were the three-seed in the Conway Regional. There, the Pirates went 2–2, losing the Regional Final to hosts, Coastal Carolina.

== Preseason ==
=== Coaches poll ===
The coaches poll was released on December 30, 2025. East Carolina was selected to win the conference.

Coaches' Poll
Predicted finish	Team	Points
1	East Carolina	75 (4)
2	UTSA	70 (4)
3	Charlotte	62
4	Tulane	57
5	South Florida	54
6	Florida Atlantic	45
7	Rice	45
8	Wichita State	24
9	Memphis	19
10	UAB	16

== Game log ==
2026 East Carolina Pirates baseball game log (38–24–1)
Regular season (33–21–1)

February (6–4–1)
Date	TV	Opponent	Rank	Stadium	Score	Win	Loss	Save	Attendance	Overall	AAC	Source
February 13	ESPN+	Xavier*		Clark–LeClair Stadium; Greenville, NC	**L** 3–4	Muck (1–0)	**Webb** (0–1)	Poole (1)	4,497	0–1	—	Report
February 14 (Note: Part of a doubleheader.)	ESPN+	Xavier*		Clark–LeClair Stadium	**L** 3–9	Bridenthal (1–0)	**Van Kempen** (0–1)	Helsel (1)	3,725	0–2	—	Report
February 14	ESPN+	Xavier*		Clark–LeClair Stadium	**W** 12–5	**Weber** (1–0)	Detienne (0–1)	None	4,122	1–2	—	Report
February 17	FloSports	at Campbell*		Jim Perry Stadium; Buies Creek, NC	**L** 1–2	Brailey (1–0)	**Webb** (0–2)	Music (2)	1,043	1–3	—	Report
February 18	ESPN+	Northern Illinois*		Clark–LeClair Stadium	**W** 11–5	**Ciccone** (1–0)	Micklinghoff (0–1)	None	3,990	2–3	—	Report
February 20	ESPN+	No. 11 North Carolina*		Clark–LeClair Stadium	**L** 0–10^{8}	Decaro (1–0)	**Norby** (0–1)	None	5,728	2–4	—	Report
February 21	WRHD	vs. No. 11 North Carolina*		Durham Bulls Athletic Park; Durham, NC	**W** 10–3	**Jenkins** (1–0)	McDuffie (1–1)	None	6,397	3–4	—	Report
February 22 (Note: Game suspended in the fifth inning due to inclement weather. The game ended in a tie.)	ACCN	at No. 11 North Carolina*		Boshamer Stadium; Chapel Hill, NC	**T** 3–3^{5}	None	None	None	3,200	3–4–1	—	Report
February 25	WRHD	vs. Charleston*		Segra Stadium; Fayetteville, NC	**W** 8–7	**Jenkins** (2–0)	Sweeney (0–1)	None	1,236	4–4–1	—	Report
LeClair Classic
February 27	ESPN+	Rutgers*		Clark–LeClair Stadium	**W** 14–2^{7}	**Norby** (1–1)	Harrison (1–1)	None	4,277	5–4–1	—	Report
February 28	ESPN+	Troy*		Clark–LeClair Stadium	**W** 5–2	**Van Kempen** (1–1)	Thigpen (0–3)	**Jenkins** (1)	5,372	6–4–1	—	Report

March (11–8)
Date	TV	Opponent	Rank	Stadium	Score	Win	Loss	Save	Attendance	Overall	AAC	Source
LeClair Classic
March 1	ESPN+	Western Carolina*		Clark–LeClair Stadium	**L** 0–2	Myers (2–0)	Weber (1–1)	Austin (3)	5,411	6–5–1	—	Report
March 4	FloSports	at UNCW*		Brooks Field; Wilmington, NC	**W** 5–3	**Webb** (1–2)	Sobol (0–1)	None	2,517	7–5–1	—	Report
March 6	ESPN+	at No. 16 Coastal Carolina*		Springs Brooks Stadium; Conway, SC	**L** 6–10^{10}	Richardson (1–1)	**Rose** (0–1)	None	3,872	7–6–1	—	Report
March 7	ESPN+	at No. 16 Coastal Carolina*		Springs Brooks Stadium	**L** 1–7	Norman (2–2)	**Antolick** (0–1)	None	4,362	7–7–1	—	Report
March 8	ESPN+	at No. 16 Coastal Carolina*		Springs Brooks Stadium	**W** 10–4^{6}	**Moran** (1–0)	Doran (3–1)	None	3,567	8–7–1	—	Report
March 10	ESPN+	Old Dominion*		Clark–LeClair Stadium	**W** 11–0^{7}	**Towers** (1–0)	Matela (1–1)	**Marley** (1)	3,927	9–7–1	—	Report
March 11		at William & Mary*		Plumeri Park; Williamsburg, VA	**W** 24–3^{7}	**Antolick** (1–1)	Boyd (0–2)	None	642	10–7–1	—	Report
March 13	ESPN+	Penn*		Clark–LeClair Stadium	**W** 17–3^{7}	**Webb** (2–2)	Moss (1–1)	None	4,043	11–7–1	—	Report
March 14	ESPN+	Penn*		Clark–LeClair Stadium	**L** 0–1	Coyne (1–2)	**Jenkins** (2–1)	Darling (2)	4,370	11–8–1	—	Report
March 15	ESPN+	Penn*		Clark–LeClair Stadium	**W** 8–7^{10}	**Antolick** (2–1)	Newburn (0–1)	None	4,117	12–8–1	—	Report
March 17	ESPN+	Elon*		Clark–LeClair Stadium	**W** 4–3	**Towers** (2–0)	Lintelman (0–1)	**Jenkins** (2)	3,858	13–8–1	—	Report
March 20	ESPN+	UAB		Clark–LeClair Stadium	**W** 3–2	**Norby** (2–1)	Steele (2–2)	**Jenkins** (3)	4,279	14–8–1	1–0	Report
March 21	ESPN+	UAB		Clark–LeClair Stadium	**W** 18–1^{7}	**Rose** (1–1)	Helmers (0–1)	None	4,499	15–8–1	2–0	Report
March 22	ESPN+	UAB		Clark–LeClair Stadium	**L** 4–11	Shelton (1–1)	**Antolick** (2–2)	None	4,170	15–9–1	2–1	Report
March 24	ACCN	at Duke*		Jack Coombs Field; Durham, NC	**L** 8–9	Anderson (1–0)	**Hoagland** (0–1)	None	884	15–10–1	—	Report
March 27	ESPN+	at UTSA		Roadrunner Field; San Antonio, TX	**W** 3–0	**Norby** (3–1)	Okerholm (0–2)	**Webb** (1)	1,205	16–10–1	3–1	Report
March 28	ESPN+	at UTSA		Roadrunner Field	**L** 1–6	Myles (3–1)	**Towers** (2–1)	Simmons (3)	1,174	16–11–1	3–2	Report
March 29	ESPN+	at UTSA		Roadrunner Field	**L** 7–8^{10}	Demont (1–0)	**Webb** (2–3)	None	992	16–12–1	3–3	Report
March 31	ESPN+	UNC Wilmington*		Clark–LeClair Stadium	**W** 14–8	**Marley** (1–0)	Capocci (1–2)	**Bouche** (1)	4,658	17–12–1	—	Report

April (11–5)
Date	TV	Opponent	Rank	Stadium	Score	Win	Loss	Save	Attendance	Overall	AAC	Source
April 2	ESPN+	Charlotte		Clark–LeClair Stadium	**W** 12–2^{7}	**Payne** (1–0)	Taylor (4–3)	None	4,339	18–12–1	4–3	Report
April 3	ESPN+	Charlotte		Clark–LeClair Stadium	**W** 12–9	**Rose** (2–1)	Stanton (1–1)	**Jenkins** (4)	4,489	19–12–1	5–3	Report
April 4	ESPN+	Charlotte		Clark–LeClair Stadium	**W** 15–5^{7}	**Webb** (3–3)	Munn (3–2)	None	4,574	20–12–1	6–3	Report
April 7	ESPN+	Duke*		Clark–LeClair Stadium	**W** 8–6	**Towers** (3–1)	Bryan (1–1)	**Jenkins** (5)	4,932	21–12–1	—	Report
April 10	ESPN+	at Tulane		Turchin Stadium; New Orleans, LA	**L** 1–4	Cehajic (2–3)	**Payne** (1–1)	Larson (3)	2,204	21–13–1	6–4	Report
April 11	ESPN+	at Tulane		Turchin Stadium	**W** 9–6	**Webb** (4–3)	Moore (0–1)	**Jenkins** (6)	1,825	22–13–1	7–4	Report
April 12	ESPN+	at Tulane		Turchin Stadium	**L** 3–6	Rodriguez (5–0)	**Hoagland** (0–2)	Brafa (1)	1,636	22–14–1	7–5	Report
April 14	ESPN+	NC State*		Clark–LeClair Stadium	**L** 3–10	Hemric (2–1)	**Towers** (3–2)	None	5,584	22–15–1	—	Report
April 17	ESPN+	Wichita State		Clark–LeClair Stadium	**W** 7–1	**Webb** (5–3)	Cuccias (3–2)	None	4,368	23–15–1	8–5	Report
April 18	ESPN+	Wichita State		Clark–LeClair Stadium	**W** 7–1	**Norby** (4–1)	Sharp (0–1)	**Webb** (2)	5,304	24–15–1	9–5	Report
April 19	ESPN+	Wichita State		Clark–LeClair Stadium	**L** 1–13	Tsengeg (2–0)	**Towers** (3–3)	None	4,147	24–16–1	9–6	Report
April 21		at Old Dominion*		Bud Metheny Ballpark; Norfolk, VA	**W** 19–9^{7}	**Payne** (2–1)	Jack (0–1)	None	464	25–16–1	—	Report
April 24	ESPN+	South Florida		Clark–LeClair Stadium	**W** 11–1^{7}	**Towers** (4–3)	**Senay** (6–3)	None	4,249	26–16–1	10–6	Report
April 25	ESPN+	South Florida		Clark–LeClair Stadium	**W** 12–4	**Norby** (5–1)	Smith (4–2)	None	4,497	27–16–1	11–6	Report
April 25	ESPN+	South Florida		Clark–LeClair Stadium	**W** 12–2^{8}	**Webb** (6–3)	Sutton (2–2)	None	4,497	28–16–1	12–6	Report
April 28	ACCNX	at NC State*		Doak Field; Raleigh, NC	**L** 2–12^{8}	Manuel (1–0)	**Moran** (1–1)	None	3,123	28–17–1	—	Report

May (5–4)
Date	TV	Opponent	Rank	Stadium	Score	Win	Loss	Save	Attendance	Overall	AAC	Source
May 1	ESPN+	at Memphis		FedExPark; Memphis, TN	**W** 12–0^{8}	**Towers** (5–3)	Howell (4–6)	None	612	29–17–1	13–6	Report
May 2	ESPN+	at Memphis		FedExPark	**L** 3–5	Case (5–6)	**Norby** (5–2)	Fair (9)	712	29–18–1	13–7	Report
May 3	ESPN+	at Memphis		FedExPark	**L** 4–9	Garner (1–5)	**Webb** (6–4)	None	612	29–19–1	13–8	Report
May 8	ESPN+	Rice		Clark–LeClair Stadium	**L** 5–10	Sharp (4–2)	**Webb** (6–5)	None	4,173	29–20–1	13–9	Report
May 9	ESPN+	Rice		Clark–LeClair Stadium	**L** 3–5	Sanders (5–5)	**Norby** (5–3)	Thames (6)	4,462	29–21–1	13–10	Report
May 10	ESPN+	Rice		Clark–LeClair Stadium	**W** 3–0	**Rose** (3–1)	Urbanczyk (4–4)	**Hoagland** (1)	4,087	30–21–1	14–10	Report
May 12	ESPN+	Campbell*		Clark–LeClair Stadium	**Canceled**							
May 14	ESPN+	at Florida Atlantic		FAU Baseball Stadium; Boca Raton, FL	**W** 7–5	**Towers** (6–3)	Kilby (2–2)	**Wallace** (1)	502	31–21–1	15–10	Report
May 15	ESPN+	at Florida Atlantic		FAU Baseball Stadium	**W** 6–1	**Norby** (6–3)	Witmer (0–1)	None	722	32–21–1	16–10	Report
May 16	ESPN+	at Florida Atlantic		FAU Baseball Stadium	**W** 13–2^{7}	**Payne** (3–1)	Robinson (2–4)	None	500	33–21–1	17–10	Report

Postseason (5–3)

American tournament (3–1)
Date	TV	Opponent	Rank	Stadium	Score	Win	Loss	Save	Attendance	Overall	AACT Record	Source
May 22	ESPN+	vs. (3) Rice	(2)	BayCare Ballpark; Clearwater, FL	**W** 4–3	**Towers** (7–3)	Sanders (5–6)	**Norby** (1)		34–21–1	1–0	Report
May 23	ESPN+	vs. (1) UTSA	(2)	BayCare Ballpark	**L** 2–4	Simmons (8–4)	**Rose** (3–2)	Kelley (2)		34–22–1	1–1	Report
May 23	ESPN+	vs. (7) Wichita State	(2)	BayCare Ballpark	**W** 13–3^{8}	**Paxton** (1–0)	Rogers (0–3)	None		35–22–1	2–1	Report
May 24	ESPNews	vs. (1) UTSA	(2)	BayCare Ballpark	**W** 1–0	**Norby** (7–3)	Debattista (3–4)	**Hoagland** (2)		36–22–1	3–1	Report

Chapel Hill Regional (2–2)
Date	TV	Opponent	Rank	Stadium	Score	Win	Loss	Save	Attendance	Overall	NCAAT Record	Source
May 29	ESPNU	vs. (2) No. 23 Tennessee	(3)	Boshamer Stadium	**W** 7–3^{14}	**Antolick** (3–2)	Haas (0–1)	None	3,781	37–22–1	1–0	Report
May 30	ACCN	at (1) No. 4 North Carolina	(3)	Boshamer Stadium	**L** 5–7	Glauber (10–0)	**Hoagland** (0–3)	McDuffie (6)	4,254	37–23–1	1–1	Report
May 31	ESPN+	vs. (4) VCU	(3)	Boshamer Stadium	**W** 10–0	**Rose** (4–2)	Vaughan (2–2)	None	3,626	38–23–1	2–1	Report
May 31	ACCN	at (1) No. 4 North Carolina	(3)	Boshamer Stadium	**L** 3–9	Rose (4–0)	**Towers** (7–4)	None	4,022	38–24–1	2–2	Report

Legend: = Win = Loss = Tie = Canceled
Bold = East Carolina team member * Non-conference game
Rankings are based on the team's current ranking in the D1Baseball poll.

Schedule Notes

== Rankings ==
Ranking movements Legend: ██ Increase in ranking ██ Decrease in ranking — = Not ranked RV = Received votes
	Week																	
Poll	Pre	1	2	3	4	5	6	7	8	9	10	11	12	13	14	15	16	Final
Coaches'	—	—*	—	—	—	—	—	—	—	—	—	RV	—	—	RV	—	—*	
Baseball America	—	—	—	—	—	—	—	—	—	—	—	—	—	—	—	—*	—*	
NCBWA†	—	—	—	—	—	—	—	RV	RV	RV	—	RV	RV	—	—	—*	RV	
D1Baseball	—	—	—	—	—	—	—	—	—	—	—	—	—	—	—	—	—*	
Perfect Game	—	—	—	—	—	—	—	—	—	—	—	—	—	—	—	—*	—*	

† NCBWA ranks 30 teams in their preseason poll, but only ranks 25 teams weekly during the season.
* A new poll was not released for this week, so for comparison purposes, the previous week's ranking is inserted in this week's slot.
