= David Pierce (baseball) =

American baseball coach (born 1962)

Current position
- Title: Head coach
- Team: Rice
- Conference: The American
- Record: 48–46

Biographical details
- Born: October 13, 1962 (age 64); Houston, Texas, U.S.

Playing career
- 1982–83: Wharton County JC
- 1984–85: Houston

Coaching career (HC unless noted)
- 1989–1990: St. Pius X HS (TX)
- 1991: Rice (asst.)
- 1992–1995: Episcopal HS (TX) (asst.)
- 1996–2000: Dobie HS (TX)
- 2001–2002: Houston (asst.)
- 2003–2011: Rice (asst.)
- 2012–2014: Sam Houston
- 2015–2016: Tulane
- 2017–2024: Texas
- 2025: Texas State (asst.)
- 2025–present: Rice

Head coaching record
- Overall: 542–317 (.631)

Accomplishments and honors

Championships
- 3 Big 12 regular season (2018, 2021, 2023); AAC regular season (2016); 3 Southland regular season (2012–2014)

Awards
- Baseball America Coach of the Year (2018); 2x Big 12 Coach of the Year (2018, 2021); 2x Southland Coach of the Year (2012, 2013); 2x ABCA Regional Coach of the Year (2012, 2021)

David Pierce (born October 13, 1962) is an American college baseball coach who is currently the head coach at Rice University.

== Assistant coaching history ==
=== Houston ===
Having coached at Rice in 1991 and then in the high school ranks, Pierce rejoined the collegiate coaching ranks at his alma mater, the University of Houston. As the Cougars hitting coach, he helped the team to two postseason tournaments. In 2002 – his second year as an assistant coach – Pierce helped UH reach a Super Regional. His hitters finished with almost 700 hits and a .310 team batting average, good for 5th in Cougar history.

=== Rice ===
Pierce joined the Rice staff as a hitting coach in 2003 and was part of the school's first national championship. After the departure of Zane Curry, Pierce became the team's pitching coach and oversaw one of the most consistent pitching staffs in the nation. From 2007 to 2010, his pitchers ranked in the top 20 nationally in ERA each year. In 2007, the Owls were fourth in the country with a 3.04 ERA. His pitching staff ranked in the top 30 in staff ERA for five years as pitching coach for the Owls.

== Head coaching career ==
=== Sam Houston State ===
Pierce was hired as Sam Houston's head coach in 2011 following former coaching legend Mark Johnson's retirement. In his first season as head coach, Pierce coached the Bearkats to their first outright conference title since 1989. In the 40-win season, the team won 13 straight games and was nationally ranked in each of the major national polls at one point in the season. In conference play, the Bearkats won a Southland record 24 games. His team earned an at-large bid to the Houston Regional, where it matched the program's best regional finish in history, defeating No. 1 seed Rice and reaching the final against Arkansas. That season, Pierce was named Southland Conference Coach of the Year and AMCA Regional Coach of the Year. In his time at Sam Houston State, Pierce's teams won the Southland Conference regular season and appeared in the NCAA tournament every season.

=== Tulane ===
On June 8, 2014, Tulane University announced it had hired Pierce as its 23rd head baseball coach, following long-time coach Rick Jones' retirement due to health concerns. In his first year at Tulane, David Pierce brought the Green Wave back to postseason play for the first time since 2008. In 2016, he improved on that and brought Tulane its first conference championship since 2005.

=== Texas ===
Pierce was hired as the head coach of The University of Texas baseball program on June 29, 2016, to replace former head coach Augie Garrido. In 2018, Pierce led the Longhorns to the Big 12 Conference regular season title, NCAA Regional and Super Regional crowns, and the program's 36th appearance in the College World Series. Pierce was named the Big 12 Coach of the Year and Baseball America College Coach of the Year in 2018.

Pierce was fired with two years left on his contract after leading the Longhorns to a 36–24 record in 2024.

=== Rice ===
Pierce began the 2025 season as an assistant coach at Texas State but was hired to replace José Cruz Jr. as head coach of the Rice baseball program in March after a 4–16 start to the season.

== Head coaching record ==
Record table
Season	Team	Overall	Conference	Standing	Postseason
Sam Houston State Bearkats (Southland Conference) (2012–2014)
2012	Sam Houston State	40–22	24–9	1st	NCAA Regional
2013	Sam Houston State	38–22	20–7	1st	NCAA Regional
2014	Sam Houston State	43–19	22–8	1st	NCAA Regional
Sam Houston State:		121–63	66–24		
Tulane Green Wave (American Athletic Conference) (2015–2016)
2015	Tulane	35–25	13–11	T-3rd	NCAA Regional
2016	Tulane	41–21	15–7	1st	NCAA Regional
Tulane:		76–46	28–18		
Texas Longhorns (Big 12 Conference) (2017–2024)
2017	Texas	39–24	11–12	6th	NCAA Regional
2018	Texas	42–23	17–7	1st	College World Series
2019	Texas	27–27	7–16	9th	
2020	Texas	14–3	0–0	—	Season canceled due to COVID-19
2021	Texas	50–17	17–7	T–1st	College World Series
2022	Texas	47–22	14–10	T-5th	College World Series
2023	Texas	42–22	15–9	T-1st	NCAA Super Regional
2024	Texas	36–24	20–10	3rd	NCAA Regional
Texas:		297–162 (.647)	101–71 (.587)		
Rice Owls (American Athletic Conference) (2025–present)
2025	Rice	13–22	10–17	8th	AAC Tournament
2026	Rice	35–24	16–11	3rd	AAC Tournament
Rice:		48–46 (.511)	26–28 (.481)		
Total:		542–317 (.631)			
National champion Postseason invitational champion Conference regular season champion Conference regular season and conference tournament champion Division regular season champion Division regular season and conference tournament champion Conference tournament champion

== See also ==
- List of current NCAA Division I baseball coaches
