= American Conference baseball tournament =

- Conference baseball championship
- Sport: Baseball
- Conference: American Conference
- Number of teams: 8
- Format: Double-elimination tournament
- Current stadium: BayCare Ballpark
- Current location: Clearwater, Florida
- Played: 2014–present
- Last contest: 2026
- Current champion: East Carolina
- Most championships: East Carolina (5)
- Official website: theamerican.org/baseball

Host stadiums
- BayCare Ballpark (2014–present)

Host locations
- Clearwater, FL (2014–present)

The American Conference baseball tournament is the conference championship tournament in college baseball for the American Conference, known until July 2025 as the American Athletic Conference. It is a round-robin tournament, with seeding based on regular season records. The winner receives the conference's automatic bid to the NCAA Division I Baseball Championship each season. The Tournament champion is separate from the conference champion. The conference championship is determined solely by regular season record.

The American is one of two successors to the original Big East Conference, which split after the 2013 season. The tournament was held in the same location as the previous six Big East Conference baseball tournaments in 2014, at Bright House Field in Clearwater, Florida.

== Format ==
Unlike the previous Big East Tournament, the American adopted a round-robin tournament format in 2014. The top eight teams were divided into two groups of four, with each team facing the others in the group. The winners of each group then faced off in a single championship game. This format was similar to the format used by several new members from the Conference USA baseball tournament from 2010 to 2013.

In 2015, the event reverted to the traditional two-bracket, double-elimination tournament leading to a single championship game.

== Champions ==
=== By year ===
Year	Champion	Runner-up	Venue	Most Valuable Player
2014	Houston	Louisville	BayCare Ballpark • Clearwater, FL	Josh Vidales, Houston
2015	East Carolina	Houston	BayCare Ballpark • Clearwater, FL	Hunter Allen, East Carolina
2016	UConn	Houston	BayCare Ballpark • Clearwater, FL	Anthony Kay, UConn
2017	Houston	East Carolina	BayCare Ballpark • Clearwater, FL	Jake Scheiner, Houston
2018	East Carolina	UConn	BayCare Ballpark • Clearwater, FL	Spencer Brickhouse, East Carolina
2019	Cincinnati	UConn	BayCare Ballpark • Clearwater, FL	A.J. Bumpass, Cincinnati
2020	Cancelled due to the Coronavirus Pandemic			
2021	South Florida	UCF	BayCare Ballpark • Clearwater, FL	Daniel Cantu, South Florida
2022	East Carolina	Houston	BayCare Ballpark • Clearwater, FL	Jacob Jenkins-Cowart, East Carolina
2023	Tulane	East Carolina	BayCare Ballpark • Clearwater, FL	Teo Banks, Tulane
2024	Tulane	Wichita State	BayCare Ballpark • Clearwater, FL	Jackson Linn, Tulane
2025	East Carolina	Tulane	BayCare Ballpark • Clearwater, FL	Braden Burress, East Carolina
2026	East Carolina	UTSA	BayCare Ballpark • Clearwater, FL	Ethan Norby, East Carolina

=== By school ===
This table of championship statistics is updated after each event. It is current as of the end of the 2025 tournament.

School	App.	W	L	Pct.	Titles	Winning years
East Carolina	11	32	14	.696	5	2015, 2018, 2022, 2025, 2026
Houston	9	20	13	.606	2	2014, 2017
Tulane	9	18	15	.545	2	2023, 2024
South Florida	9	13	15	.464	1	2021
Cincinnati	8	5	14	.263	1	2019
UConn	6	15	10	.600	1	2016
UCF	9	14	17	.452	0	
Memphis	9	13	17	.433	0	
Wichita State	7	10	14	.417	0	
UTSA	3	4	5	.444	0	
Florida Atlantic	3	3	5	.375	0	
Charlotte	3	2	5	.286	0	
Rice	3	2	6	.250	0	
UAB	2	1	4	.200	0	
Louisville	1	2	2	.500	0	
Rutgers	1	1	2	.333	0	
Temple	1	1	2	.333	0	

Italics indicate school no longer sponsors baseball in The American.
