= 2022 American Athletic Conference baseball tournament =

American college baseball tournament

- Teams: 8
- Format: Double-elimination tournament
- Finals site: BayCare Ballpark; Clearwater, FL
- Champions: East Carolina (3rd title)
- Winning coach: Cliff Godwin (3rd title)
- MVP: Jacob Jenkins-Cowart (East Carolina)

2022 American Athletic Conference baseball standings
	Conf.						Overall
Team	W		L		T	PCT	W		L		T	PCT
No. 10 East Carolina ‍†‍‡‍^{y}	20	–	4	–	0	.833	42	–	18	–	0	.700
UCF ‍‍‍	14	–	10	–	0	.583	35	–	25	–	0	.583
Houston ‍‍‍	13	–	11	–	0	.542	37	–	24	–	0	.607
Cincinnati ‍‍‍	12	–	12	–	0	.500	24	–	31	–	0	.436
Tulane ‍‍‍	11	–	13	–	0	.458	33	–	26	–	1	.558
Wichita State ‍‍‍	9	–	15	–	0	.375	21	–	36	–	0	.368
Memphis ‍‍‍	9	–	15	–	0	.375	26	–	29	–	0	.473
South Florida ‍‍‍	8	–	16	–	0	.333	28	–	29	–	0	.491
† – Conference champion ‡ – Tournament champion y – Invited to the NCAA tournament Rankings from D1Baseball

The 2022 American Athletic Conference baseball tournament was held at BayCare Ballpark in Clearwater, Florida, from May 24 through 29. The event, held at the end of the conference regular season, determined the champion of the American Athletic Conference for the 2022 season. The winner of the double-elimination tournament received the conference's automatic bid to the 2022 NCAA Division I baseball tournament.

The Tournament has been held since 2014, the first year of the rebranding as the American Athletic Conference. Since then, Houston and East Carolina have each won the event twice, while among current members Cincinnati and South Florida have each won once.

== Format and seeding ==
All eight baseball teams in The American will be seeded based on their records in conference play. The tournament will use a two bracket double-elimination format, leading to a single championship game between the winners of each bracket.

== Bracket ==
First round
1	East Carolina	7
8	South Florida	4
4	Cincinnati	8
5	Tulane	1
8	South Florida	6
5	Tulane	9
2	UCF	6
7	Memphis	7
3	Houston	10
6	Wichita State	7
2	UCF	12
6	Wichita State	4

Second round
1	East Carolina	15^{7}
4	Cincinnati	5
4	Cincinnati	5
5	Tulane	13
7	Memphis	7
3	Houston	8
7	Memphis	2
2	UCF	15^{7}

Semifinals
1	East Carolina	8	–
5	Tulane	5	–
3	Houston	8	9
2	UCF	9^{10}	6

Finals
1	East Carolina	6
3	Houston	1

== Schedule ==
Game	Time*	Matchup^{#}	Score	Television
Tuesday, May 24
1	9:00am	No. 4 Cincinnati vs No. 5 Tulane	8–1	ESPN+
2	12:30pm	No. 1 East Carolina vs No. 8 South Florida	7–6	ESPN+
3	4:00pm	No. 2 UCF vs No. 7 Memphis	6–7	ESPN+
4	7:30pm	No. 3 Houston vs No. 6 Wichita State	10–7	ESPN+
Wednesday, May 25
5	3:00pm	No. 5 Tulane vs No. 8 South Florida	9–6	ESPN+
6	7:30pm	No. 2 UCF vs No. 6 Wichita State	12–4	ESPN+
Thursday, May 26
7	1:00pm	No. 1 East Carolina vs No. 4 Cincinnati	15–5^{7}	ESPN+
8	4:30pm	No. 3 Houston vs No. 7 Memphis	8–7	ESPN+
Friday, May 27
9	1:00pm	No. 5 Tulane vs No. 4 Cincinnati	13–4	ESPN+
10	4:30pm	No. 2 UCF vs No. 7 Memphis	15–2	ESPN+
Semifinals – Saturday, May 28
11	9:00am	No. 1 East Carolina vs No. 5 Tulane	8–5	ESPN+
12	12:30pm	No. 2 UCF vs No. 3 Houston	9–8^{10}	ESPN+
13	4:00pm	No. 2 UCF vs No. 3 Houston	9–6	ESPN+
Championship – Sunday, May 29				ESPN+
14	12:00pm	No. 1 East Carolina vs No. 3 Houston	6–1	ESPNEWS
*Game times in EDT. # – Rankings denote tournament seed.
