= 2026 South Florida Bulls baseball team =

American college baseball season

2026 South Florida Bulls baseball
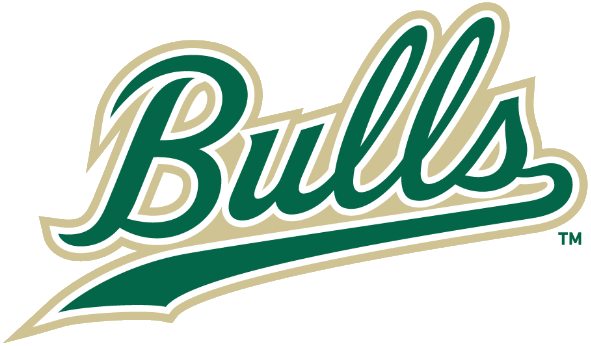
- Conference: American Conference (NCAA)
- Record: 32–21 (11–16 American)
- Head coach: Mitch Hannahs (2nd season)
- Assistant coaches: Blake Kangas (2nd season); Bryan Peters (2nd season); Jordan Schaffer (2nd season)
- Pitching coach: Daniel Schlereth (2nd season)
- Home stadium: USF Baseball Stadium

2026 American Conference baseball standings
	Conf.						Overall
Team	W		L		T	PCT	W		L		T	PCT
UTSA ‍†‍‍	17	–	10	–	0	.630	38	–	20	–	0	.655
East Carolina ‍†‍‡‍^{y}	17	–	10	–	0	.630	36	–	22	–	1	.619
Rice ‍‍‍	16	–	11	–	0	.593	35	–	24	–	0	.593
UAB ‍‍‍	15	–	12	–	0	.556	32	–	26	–	0	.552
Memphis ‍‍‍	13	–	14	–	0	.481	24	–	34	–	0	.414
Florida Atlantic ‍‍‍	12	–	15	–	0	.444	28	–	28	–	0	.500
Wichita State ‍‍‍	12	–	15	–	0	.444	31	–	29	–	0	.517
Charlotte ‍‍‍	12	–	15	–	0	.444	28	–	28	–	0	.500
South Florida ‍‍‍	11	–	16	–	0	.407	32	–	21	–	0	.604
Tulane ‍‍‍	10	–	17	–	0	.370	25	–	31	–	0	.446
† – Conference champion ‡ – Tournament champion y – Invited to the NCAA tournament As of May 26, 2026; Rankings from D1Baseball

The 2026 South Florida Bulls baseball team represents University of South Florida Bulls during the 2026 NCAA Division I baseball season. The Bulls play their home games at USF Baseball Stadium as a member of the American Conference. They are led by second-year head coach Mitch Hannahs.

== Previous season ==
The Bulls are coming off a 31–25 (16–11) season, where they qualified for the 2025 American Athletic Conference baseball tournament as the third-overall seed, where they went 2–2.

== Preseason ==
=== Coaches poll ===
The coaches poll was released on December 30, 2025. South Florida was selected to win the conference.

Coaches' Poll
Predicted finish	Team	Points
1	East Carolina	75 (4)
2	UTSA	70 (4)
3	Charlotte	62
4	Tulane	57
5	South Florida	54
6	Florida Atlantic	45
7	Rice	45
8	Wichita State	24
9	Memphis	19
10	UAB	16

== Personnel ==
=== Starters ===
Lineup
Pos.	No.	Player.	Year
C	20	Lance Trippel	Senior
1B	9	Eli Thomas	Freshman
2B	3	Bradke Lohry	Senior
3B	10	Jack Lutz	Freshman
SS	1	Jevin Relaford	Senior
LF	18	Jake Kulikowski	Junior
CF	27	Ryan Pruitt	Senior
RF	6	Jacob Green	Senior
DH	26	Nathan Earley	Senior

Weekend pitching rotation
Day	No.	Player.	Year
Friday	19	Michael Senay	Freshman
Saturday	44	Edwin Alicea	Junior
Sunday	32	Landen Yorek	Senior

=== Roster ===
2026 South Florida Bulls baseball team
Players
Coaches

#	Pos.	Name	B/T	Height	Weight	Year	Home town
1	INF	Jevin Relaford	R/R	5 ft 10 in (1.78 m)	175 lb (79 kg)	Sr	Jacksonville, FL
2	INF	Matt Rose	R/R	5 ft 6 in (1.68 m)	175 lb (79 kg)	Sr	Clearwater, FL
3	INF	Bradke Lohry	R/R	5 ft 8 in (1.73 m)	170 lb (77 kg)	Sr	Trinity, FL
4	RHP	Kaden Smith	R/R	6 ft 2 in (1.88 m)	190 lb (86 kg)	So	Ocala, FL
5	INF	Rafael Betancourt	S/R	5 ft 11 in (1.8 m)	190 lb (86 kg)	Sr	Delton, FL
6	OF	Jacob Green	L/L	6 ft 1 in (1.85 m)	195 lb (88 kg)	Sr	St. Petersburg, FL
8	OF	Gabe Graulau	R/R	6 ft 4 in (1.93 m)	200 lb (91 kg)	Fr	Jupiter, FL
9	INF	Eli Thomas	L/R	5 ft 11 in (1.8 m)	180 lb (82 kg)	Fr	Plant City, FL
10	INF	Jack Lutz	L/R	5 ft 10 in (1.78 m)	150 lb (68 kg)	Fr	Greenfield, WI
12	C	Jackson Geiger	L/R	6 ft 2 in (1.88 m)	210 lb (95 kg)	Fr	Naples, FL
13	LHP	Easton Storey	L/L	5 ft 11 in (1.8 m)	210 lb (95 kg)	Jr	Brighton, MI
14	INF	Carter Murphy	R/R	6 ft 2 in (1.88 m)	245 lb (111 kg)	Jr	Terre Haute, IN
15	OF	Jackson Mirza	L/L	6 ft 0 in (1.83 m)	155 lb (70 kg)	Fr	Tampa, FL
16	INF	Easton Beach	R/R	6 ft 2 in (1.88 m)	175 lb (79 kg)	Fr	Polk City, FL
17	INF	Joey Brenczewski	S/R	6 ft 3 in (1.91 m)	195 lb (88 kg)	RS Jr	Fishers, IN
18	OF	Jake Kulikowski	L/L	5 ft 11 in (1.8 m)	190 lb (86 kg)	Jr	Trinity, FL
19	RHP	Michael Senay	R/R	6 ft 2 in (1.88 m)	200 lb (91 kg)	Fr	Orlando, FL
20	C	Lance Trippel	R/R	6 ft 2 in (1.88 m)	220 lb (100 kg)	Sr	Sarasota, FL
21	C	Carson Cabbage	R/R	6 ft 2 in (1.88 m)	210 lb (95 kg)	Jr	Huntersville, NC
22	RHP	Ethan Sutton	R/R	6 ft 3 in (1.91 m)	215 lb (98 kg)	RS So	Acworth, GA
24	UTL	Victor Cartagena	R/R	6 ft 2 in (1.88 m)	205 lb (93 kg)	Jr	Guayama, PR
25	OF	Dawson Mock	L/L	6 ft 0 in (1.83 m)	190 lb (86 kg)	Jr	Mayo, FL
26	INF	Nathan Earley	L/L	6 ft 3 in (1.91 m)	225 lb (102 kg)	Sr	Cincinnati, OH
27	OF	Ryan Pruitt	L/L	5 ft 11 in (1.8 m)	185 lb (84 kg)	Sr	Trophy Club, TX
28	OF	Brock Silvers	R/R	6 ft 5 in (1.96 m)	215 lb (98 kg)	Fr	Middleton, ID
29	RHP	Will Allen	R/R	6 ft 4 in (1.93 m)	210 lb (95 kg)	Fr	Warner Robins, GA
30	RHP	Brisen Tweedy	R/R	6 ft 2 in (1.88 m)	195 lb (88 kg)	Fr	Plant City, FL
31	LHP	Nakni Anna	L/L	5 ft 9 in (1.75 m)	175 lb (79 kg)	Jr	Calera, OK
32	RHP	Landen Yorek	R/R	6 ft 2 in (1.88 m)	195 lb (88 kg)	Sr	Spring, TX
33	C	Santiago Carriles	R/R	5 ft 10 in (1.78 m)	200 lb (91 kg)	Jr	Miami, FL
34	RHP	Jorge DeCardenas	R/R	6 ft 1 in (1.85 m)	200 lb (91 kg)	Sr	Palm Beach Gardens, FL
35	RHP	Lawson Gailey	R/R	6 ft 0 in (1.83 m)	210 lb (95 kg)	RS Jr	Lavonia, GA
37	LHP	Dominic Pontbriant	L/L	6 ft 3 in (1.91 m)	180 lb (82 kg)	Fr	Norwich, CT
38	RHP	Carter Krawchuk	R/R	6 ft 1 in (1.85 m)	185 lb (84 kg)	Jr	St. Catharines, ON
39	RHP	Nolan Bernard	R/R	6 ft 2 in (1.88 m)	220 lb (100 kg)	So	Walden, TN
40	LHP	Christian Brown	L/L	6 ft 2 in (1.88 m)	190 lb (86 kg)	Jr	Center Grove, IN
42	INF	Juan Correa	R/R	6 ft 5 in (1.96 m)	220 lb (100 kg)	Sr	Weston, FL
43	RHP	Jonah Sarabia	R/R	6 ft 3 in (1.91 m)	200 lb (91 kg)	Jr	Columbia, MO
44	LHP	Edwin Alicea	L/L	6 ft 5 in (1.96 m)	240 lb (109 kg)	Jr	Miami, FL
45	RHP	James Hill	R/R	6 ft 2 in (1.88 m)	215 lb (98 kg)	Sr	Trinity, FL
50	RHP	Landon O'Donnell	R/R	6 ft 4 in (1.93 m)	230 lb (104 kg)	Jr	Bradenton, FL

Head coach

Link Jarrett

Assistant coach(es)

Ty Megahee
Brad Vanderglas
Drew Linder
Micah Posey

Legend

- (C) Team captain
- (S) Suspended
- (I) Ineligible
- Injured
- Current redshirt

Roster
Last update: April 3, 2026

== Game log ==
2026 South Florida Bulls baseball game log (29–18)
Regular season (29–18)

February (9–2)
Date	TV	Opponent	Rank	Stadium	Score	Win	Loss	Save	Attendance	Overall	AAC	Source
February 13	ESPN+	Illinois*		Red McEwen Field; Tampa, FL	**W** 9–4	**Bernard** (1–0)	Plumley (0–1)	**Pointbriant** (1)	1,075	1–0	—	Report
February 14	ESPN+	Illinois*		Red McEwen Field	**L** 2–4^{10}	Remington (1–0)	**Anna** (0–1)	None	734	1–1	—	Report
February 15	ESPN+	Illinois*		Red McEwen Field	**W** 11–10	**Yorek** (1–0)	Gannon (0–1)	**O'Donnell** (1)	802	2–1	—	Report
February 17	ESPN+	North Dakota State*		Red McEwen Field	**W** 9–5	**DeCardenas** (1–0)	Totten (0–1)	None	477	3–1	—	Report
February 18	ESPN+	North Dakota State*		Red McEwen Field	**W** 3–1	**Bernard** (2–0)	Shupe (0–1)	**O'Donnell** (2)	451	4–1	—	Report
February 20	ESPN+	Georgia Southern*		Red McEwen Field	**W** 9–7	**Alicea** (1–0)	Pendley (0–1)	**Sutton** (1)	405	5–1	—	Report
February 21	ESPN+	Georgia Southern*		Red McEwen Field	**W** 29–4^{7}	**Senay** (1–0)	Garrett (0–1)	None	577	6–1	—	Report
February 22	ESPN+	Georgia Southern*		Red McEwen Field	**W** 4–3	**O'Donnell** (1–0)	Robbins (0–1)	None	331	7–1	—	Report
February 24	YouTube	at Bethune–Cookman*		Jackie Robinson Ballpark; Daytona Beach, FL	**L** 3–4	Rincones (2–0)	**Sutton** (0–1)	Morales (1)	67	7–2	—	Report
War on I-4
February 27	B12N+	at UCF*		John Euliano Park; Orlando, FL	**W** 9–2	**Alicea** (2–0)	Smith (1–1)	None	2,122	8–2	—	Report
February 28	B12N+	at UCF*		John Euliano Park	**W** 2–1^{10}	**Sutton** (1–1)	Jones (1–1)	**O'Donnell** (3)	2,390	9–2	—	Report

March (13–5)
Date	TV	Opponent	Rank	Stadium	Score	Win	Loss	Save	Attendance	Overall	AAC	Source
War on I-4
March 1	B12N+	at UCF*		John Euliano Park	**L** 1–2	Gray (1–0)	**Smith** (0–1)	None	2,254	9–3	—	Report
March 3	ESPN+	Stetson*		Red McEwen Field	**W** 12–4	**Pontbriant** (2–0)	Core (0–1)	None	637	10–3	—	Report
March 6	ESPN+	Southern*		Red McEwen Field	**W** 6–1	**Alicea** (3–0)	Specer (1–2)	**Sutton** (2)	488	11–3	—	Report
March 7	ESPN+	Southern*		Red McEwen Field	**W** 15–1^{7}	**Senay** (2–0)	Thornton (0–2)	None	537	12–3	—	Report
March 8	ESPN+	Southern*		Red McEwen Field	**W** 9–2	**Smith** (1–1)	Eneix (0–2)	None	606	13–3	—	Report
March 9	ESPN+	at Jacksonville*		John Sessions Stadium; Jacksonville, FL	**W** 6–1	**DeCardenas** (2–0)	Dicks (1–1)	None	266	14–3	—	Report
March 13	ESPN+	Columbia*		Red McEwen Field	**W** 6–3	**Alicea** (4–0)	Sotiropoulos (1–1)	None	521	15–3	—	Report
March 14	ESPN+	Columbia*		Red McEwen Field	**W** 2–0	**Senay** (3–0)	Lopez (0–2)	**Sutton** (3)	575	16–3	—	Report
March 15	ESPN+	Columbia*		Red McEwen Field	**W** 10–6	**O'Donnell** (2–0)	Hicks (0–1)	None	738	17–3	—	Report
March 17	ESPN+	Jacksonville*		Red McEwen Field	**W** 13–3^{7}	**Smith** (2–1)	Dicks (1–2)	None	425	18–3	—	Report
March 20	ESPN+	Rice		Red McEwen Field	**L** 4–5	Wiggins (1–0)	**Alicea** (4–1)	Atchley (2)	675	18–4	0–1	Report
March 21	ESPN+	Rice		Red McEwen Field	**W** 2–0	**Senay** (4–0)	Urbancyzk (1–2)	**Sutton** (4)	568	19–4	1–1	Report
March 22	ESPN+	Rice		Red McEwen Field	**W** 7–2	**Smith** (3–1)	Sanders (1–3)	None	534	20–4	2–1	Report
March 24	ESPN+	at Florida Gulf Coast*		Swanson Stadium; Fort Myers, FL	**W** 7–3	**Sarabia** (1–0)	Baisley (0–2)	**Sutton** (5)	899	21–4	—	Report
March 27	ESPN+	at Charlotte		Hayes Stadium; Charlotte, NC	**L** 2–11	Copper (3–1)	**Alicea** (4–2)	Taylor (2)	651	21–5	2–2	Report
March 28	ESPN+	at Charlotte		Hayes Stadium	**W** 9–5	**Senay** (5–0)	Munn (3–1)	**Sutton** (6)	809	22–5	3–2	Report
March 29	ESPN+	at Charlotte		Hayes Stadium	**L** 3–10	Stanton (1–0)	**Bernard** (2–1)	None	742	22–6	3–3	Report
March 31	ESPN+	Bethune–Cookman*		Red McEwen Field	**L** 5–6	Anselmo (1–1)	**Allen** (0–1)	Torres (2)	528	22–7	—	Report

April (6–9)
Date	TV	Opponent	Rank	Stadium	Score	Win	Loss	Save	Attendance	Overall	AAC	Source
April 2	ESPN+	Memphis		Red McEwen Field	**W** 10–1	**Alicea** (5–2)	Garner (0–4)	None	294	23–7	4–3	Report
April 3	ESPN+	Memphis		Red McEwen Field	**L** 4–7	Howell (3–4)	**Yorek** (1–1)	Fair (6)	979	23–8	4–4	
April 4	ESPN+	Memphis		Red McEwen Field	**W** 5–0	**Senay** (6–0)	Case (2–6)	None	615	24–8	5–4	
April 7	ESPN+	Florida Gulf Coast*		Red McEwen Field	**Canceled (inclement weather)**							
April 10	ESPN+	at UTSA		Roadrunner Field; San Antonio, TX	**L** 3–11	Kelley (2–1)	**Alicia** (5–3)	None	810	24–9	5–5	
April 11 (DH 1)	ESPN+	at UTSA		Roadrunner Field	**L** 3–7	Myles (5–1)	**Senay** (6–1)	None	847	24–10	5–6	
April 11 (DH 2)	ESPN+	at UTSA		Roadrunner Field	**W** 7–1	**Smith** (4–1)	Gutierrez (1–1)	**Sutton** (7)	892	25–10	6–6	
April 15	ACCNX	at Miami (FL)*		Alex Rodriguez Park; Coral Gables, FL	**W** 4–2	**Pontbriant** (2–0)	Coats (5–2)	**Sutton** (8)	3,446	26–10	—	Report
April 17	ESPN+	UAB		Red McEwen Field	**L** 4–8	Ingram (2–3)	**Alicea** (5–4)	None	1,020	26–11	6–7	Report
April 18	ESPN+	UAB		Red McEwen Field	**L** 6–12	Samuelson (4–2)	**Senay** (6–2)	Miller (3)	510	26–12	6–8	Report
April 19	ESPN+	UAB		Red McEwen Field	**W** 1–0	**Sutton** (2–1)	Warrick (1–1)	None	599	27–12	7–8	Report
April 21	ESPN+	at Stetson*		Melching Field; DeLand, FL	**W** 6–5	**Pontbriant** (3–0)	Walker (0–2)	**Sutton** (9)	1,222	28–12	—	Report
April 24	ESPN+	at East Carolina		Clark–LeClair Stadium; Greenville, NC	**L** 1–11^{7}	Towers (4–3)	**Senay** (6–3)	None	4,249	28–13	7–9	
April 25 (DH 1)	ESPN+	at East Carolina		Clark–LeClair Stadium	**L** 4–12	Norby (5–1)	**Smith** (4–2)	None		28–14	7–10	
April 25 (DH 2)	ESPN+	at East Carolina		Clark–LeClair Stadium	**L** 2–12^{8}	Webb (6–3)	**Sutton** (2–2)	None	4,497	28–15	7–11	
April 29	ACCNX	at No. 14 Florida State*		Dick Howser Stadium; Tallahassee, FL	**L** 1–9	Whited (3–2)	**Allen** (0–2)	None	4,630	28–16		

May (4–5)
Date	TV	Opponent	Rank	Stadium	Score	Win	Loss	Save	Attendance	Overall	AAC	Source
May 1	ESPN+	Florida Atlantic		Red McEwen Field	**L** 9–12	Litman (8–3)	**Smith** (4–3)	Kimball (1)	787	28–17	7–12	Report
May 2	ESPN+	Florida Atlantic		Red McEwen Field	**L** 5–6	Grant (2–4)	**Sutton** (2–3)	Kimball (2)	446	28–18	7–13	Report
May 3	ESPN+	Florida Atlantic		Red McEwen Field	**W** 11–6	**Bernard** (3–1)	Murphy (1–6)	None	502	29–18	8–13	Report
May 8	ESPN+	at Tulane		Greer Field at Turchin Stadium; New Orleans, LA	**W 16-6**	**Alicea** (6-4)	Rodriguez (5-2)	None	1,504	30-18	9-13	Report
May 9	ESPN+	at Tulane		Greer Field at Turchin Stadium	**L** 8-9	Moore (1-1)	**Bernard** (3-2)	Cehajic (1)	1,530	30-19	9-14	Report
May 10	ESPN+	at Tulane		Greer Field at Turchin Stadium	**L** 5-9	Cehajic (3-5)	**Yorek** (1-2)	None	1,571	30-20	9-15	Report
May 14	ESPN+	Wichita State		Red McEwen Field	**W** 4-1	**Pontbriant** (4-0)	Cuccias (4-3)	**Alicea** (1)	466	31-20	10-15	Report
May 15	ESPN+	Wichita State		Red McEwen Field	**W** 7-6^{10}	**Sutton** (3-3)	Hamilton (3-7)	None	704	32-20	11-15	Report
May 16	ESPN+	Wichita State		Red McEwen Field	**L** 5-8^{10}	Hayashi (2-1)	**Alicea** (6-5)	None	568	32-21	11-16	Report

Legend: = Win = Loss = Canceled
Bold = South Florida team member * Non-conference game
Rankings are based on the team's current ranking in the D1Baseball poll.

== Rankings ==
Ranking movements Legend: ██ Increase in ranking ██ Decrease in ranking — = Not ranked RV = Received votes
	Week																
Poll	Pre	1	2	3	4	5	6	7	8	9	10	11	12	13	14	15	Final
Coaches'	—	—*	—	—	—	RV	RV	RV	RV	—	—	—	—	—	—		
Baseball America	—	—	—	—	—	—	—	—	—	—	—	—	—	—	—		
NCBWA†	RV	—	—	—	—	RV	RV	RV	RV	RV	RV	RV	RV	—	—		
D1Baseball	—	—	—	—	—	—	—	—	—	—	—	—	—	—	—		
Perfect Game	—	—	—	—	—	25	23	—	—	—	—	—	—	—	—		

† NCBWA ranks 30 teams in their preseason poll, but only ranks 25 teams weekly during the season.
* A new poll was not released for this week, so for comparison purposes, the previous week's ranking is inserted in this week's slot.
