= 2007 Conference USA baseball tournament =

- Teams: 8
- Format: Eight-team double-elimination tournament
- Finals site: Clark–LeClair Stadium; Greenville, North Carolina
- Champions: Rice (2nd title)
- Winning coach: Wayne Graham (2nd title)
- MVP: Aaron Luna (Rice)

The 2007 Conference USA baseball tournament was the 2007 postseason college baseball championship of the NCAA Division I Conference USA, held at Clark-LeClair Stadium in Greenville, North Carolina, from May 23–May 27, 2007. Rice won tournament for the second consecutive time and received Conference USA's automatic bid to the 2007 NCAA Division I baseball tournament. The tournament consisted of eight teams, with two double-elimination brackets, and a single-game final.

== Regular season results ==
Team	W	L	T	Pct	GB	Seed
Rice	22	2		.917	--	1
East Carolina	14	9		.609	7.5	2
Southern Miss	14	10		.583	8	3
Houston	12	12		.500	10	4
Memphis	12	12		.500	10	5
UAB	12	12		.500	10	6
Tulane	9	15		.375	13	7
UCF	7	17		.292	15	8
Marshall	5	18		.217	16.5	--

- Records listed are conference play only. SMU, Tulsa, and UTEP did not field baseball teams. Marshall did not qualify for tournament play.

== Bracket ==
First round May 23–24
5	**Memphis**	**12**
4	Houston	4
8	UCF	6
1	**Rice**	**16**
4	Houston	0
8	**UCF**	**1**
6	UAB	5
3	**Southern Miss**	**9**
7	Tulane	2
2	**East Carolina**	**4**
6	UAB	5
7	**Tulane**	**13**

Second round May 24–25
5	Memphis	5
1	**Rice**	**7**
5	**Memphis**	12
8	UCF	6
3	Southern Miss	1
2	**East Carolina**	**2**
3	Southern Miss	2
7	**Tulane**	**6**

Semifinals; May 26
1	**Rice**	1	**20**
5	Memphis	**2**	9
2	**East Carolina**	**9**
7	Tulane	4

Championship Game; May 27
1	**Rice**	**16**
2	East Carolina	8

- **Bold** indicates the winner of the game.
- Italics indicate that the team was eliminated from the tournament.

== Finish order ==
Finish	Team	W	L	T	Pct	Seed	Eliminated By
1	Rice^{†}	4	1	0	.800	1	
2	East Carolina^{#}	3	1	0	.750	2	Rice
3	Memphis^{#}	3	2	0	.600	5	Rice
4	Tulane	2	2	0	.500	7	East Carolina
5	Southern Miss^{#}	1	2	0	.333	3	Tulane
6	UCF	1	2	0	.333	8	Memphis
7	UAB	0	2	0	.000	6	Tulane
8	Houston	0	2	0	.000	4	UCF
^{†} - Winner of the tournament and received an automatic bid to the NCAA tournament.^{#} - Received an at-large bid to the NCAA tournament.

== All-tournament team ==
Position	Player	School
C	Danny Lehmann	Rice
IF	Adam Amar	Memphis
IF	Stephen Batts	East Carolina
IF	Bill Moss	Memphis
IF	Joe Savery	Rice
OF	Harrison Eldridge	East Carolina
OF	Josh Irvin	Memphis
OF	Anthony Scelfo	Tulane
DH/UT	Aaron Luna	Rice
P	Bobby Bowden	Southern Mississippi
P	Jaager Good	Central Florida
P	Matt Langwell	Rice
P	Shane Mathews	East Carolina
**MVP**	Aaron Luna	Rice
