= Earl Smith (coach) =

American sports coach (1917–2012)

Biographical details
- Born: May 27, 1917; Micro, North Carolina, U.S.
- Died: August 5, 2012 (aged 95); Fayetteville, North Carolina, U.S.

Coaching career (HC unless noted)

Football
- 1946–1950: Campbell

Basketball
- 1945–1946: East Carolina
- 1946–1953: Campbell
- 1959–1963: East Carolina

Baseball
- 1963–1972: East Carolina

Head coaching record
- Overall: 24–15–3 (football); 98–69 (basketball); 186–102–2 (baseball)

Norman Earl Smith (May 27, 1917 – August 5, 2012) was an American coach of many sports at Campbell University and also a basketball and baseball coach at East Carolina University. Born in Micro, North Carolina, Smith attended North Carolina State and played freshman baseball in 1936. Later he attended East Carolina where he participated in baseball, basketball, and football from his sophomore year through his senior year. He resided in Fayetteville, North Carolina until his death on August 5, 2012.

He graduated in 1939 and later became a football, basketball, baseball, tennis and cross country coach at Campbell University. Under Smith's guidance, Campbell won three straight North Carolina Junior College football championships (1946–48). He also led the 1948–49 and 1951–52 basketball teams to an overall record of 29–20 including the junior college national tournament in Hutchinson, Kansas.

In 1959 Smith returned to ECU to become head coach of the Pirates basketball team. He led the team to a record of 53–40 in his four years of coaching. In 1963, after finishing his basketball coaching career, Smith turned to the ECU baseball team. He led them to a very impressive record of 186–102–2 in nine years. Of those 186 victories, the team finished first place in the Southern Conference in four consecutive years (1966–70). After coaching, he became a professional baseball scout for the San Diego Padres.

Smith was inducted into the ECU Athletics Hall of Fame in 1977, the Campbell University Athletics Hall of Fame in 1986, and the North Carolina Sports Hall of fame in 2003.

He died at Cape Fear Valley Medical Center in 2012.
