= 2026 American Conference baseball tournament =

American college baseball tournament

- Teams: 8
- Format: Single-elimination play-in, then six-team double-elimination tournament with championship game
- Finals site: BayCare Ballpark; Clearwater, FL
- Champions: East Carolina (5th title)
- Winning coach: Cliff Godwin (5th title)
- MVP: Ethan Norby (East Carolina)

2026 American Conference baseball standings
	Conf.						Overall
Team	W		L		T	PCT	W		L		T	PCT
UTSA ‍†‍‍	17	–	10	–	0	.630	38	–	20	–	0	.655
East Carolina ‍†‍‡‍^{y}	17	–	10	–	0	.630	36	–	22	–	1	.619
Rice ‍‍‍	16	–	11	–	0	.593	35	–	24	–	0	.593
UAB ‍‍‍	15	–	12	–	0	.556	32	–	26	–	0	.552
Memphis ‍‍‍	13	–	14	–	0	.481	24	–	34	–	0	.414
Florida Atlantic ‍‍‍	12	–	15	–	0	.444	28	–	28	–	0	.500
Wichita State ‍‍‍	12	–	15	–	0	.444	31	–	29	–	0	.517
Charlotte ‍‍‍	12	–	15	–	0	.444	28	–	28	–	0	.500
South Florida ‍‍‍	11	–	16	–	0	.407	32	–	21	–	0	.604
Tulane ‍‍‍	10	–	17	–	0	.370	25	–	31	–	0	.446
† – Conference champion ‡ – Tournament champion y – Invited to the NCAA tournament As of May 26, 2026; Rankings from D1Baseball

The 2026 American Conference baseball tournament was held at BayCare Ballpark in Clearwater, Florida from May 20 through May 24. The event, which was held at the end of the conference regular season, determined the champion of the American Conference for the 2026 season. The winner of the conference tournament, East Carolina, received the conference's automatic bid to the 2026 NCAA Division I baseball tournament.

This was the first conference tournament under the American Conference name. In July 2025, the conference dropped the word "Athletic" from its name.

== Format and seeding ==
The top eight American baseball teams participated in the tournament, with the bottom four seeds playing in a single-elimination play-in round. The remaining teams then played a six-team double-elimination tournament, with the top two seeds receiving byes into the third round, and the third and fourth placed teams playing the play-in round winners in the second round. The East Carolina Pirates are the defending champions, having won the 2025 edition of the tournament.

=== Bracket ===
Play-in round Wednesday, May 20
Game 1
6	Florida Atlantic	2
7	Wichita State	3
Game 2
5	Memphis	13
8	Charlotte	9

Second round Thursday, May 21
Game 3
7	Wichita State	4
3	Rice	5
Game 4
5	Memphis	7
4	UAB	3
Lower third round Friday, May 22
Game 7
4	UAB	9
3	Rice	6
Game 8
7	Wichita State	6
5	Memphis	4

Third round Friday, May 22
Game 5
3	Rice	3
2	East Carolina	4
Game 6
5	Memphis	0
1	UTSA	4
Lower semifinal Saturday, May 23
Game 10
4	UAB	12
7	Wichita State	14

Semifinals; Saturday, May 23
Game 9
2	East Carolina	2
1	UTSA	4
Lower final Saturday, May 23
Game 11
2	East Carolina	13^{8}
7	Wichita State	3

Final; Sunday May, 24
Game 12
1	UTSA	0
2	East Carolina	1

== Schedule ==
Game	Time*	Matchup^{#}	Score	Notes
Wednesday, May 20
1	1:00pm	No. 6 Florida Atlantic vs No. 7 Wichita State	2–3	Florida Atlantic eliminated
2	5:00pm	No. 5 Memphis vs No. 8 Charlotte	13–9	Charlotte eliminated
Thursday, May 21
3	1:00pm	No. 3 Rice vs No. 7 Wichita State	5–4	
4	5:25pm	No. 4 UAB vs No. 5 Memphis	3–7	
Friday, May 22
5	9:00am	No. 2 East Carolina vs No. 3 Rice	4–3	
6	12:50pm	No. 1 UTSA vs No. 5 Memphis	4–0	
7	4:30pm	No. 4 UAB vs No. 3 Rice	9–6	Rice eliminated
8	9:07pm	No. 7 Wichita State vs No. 5 Memphis	6–4	Memphis eliminated
Saturday, May 23
9	10:00am	No. 2 East Carolina vs No. 1 UTSA	2–4	
10	2:05pm	No. 4 UAB vs No. 7 Wichita State	12–14	UAB eliminated
11	7:10pm	No. 7 Wichita State vs No. 2 East Carolina	3–13^{8}	Wichita State eliminated
Championship – Sunday, May 24
12	12:00pm	No. 1 UTSA vs No. 2 East Carolina	0–1	Championship game
*Game times in EDT. # – Rankings denote tournament seed.
