= East Carolina Pirates baseball =

- 2026 East Carolina Pirates baseball team
- Founded: 1907
- University: East Carolina University
- Head coach: Cliff Godwin (12th season)
- Conference: The American
- Location: Greenville, North Carolina
- Home stadium: Clark–LeClair Stadium (capacity: 5,000)
- Nickname: Pirates
- Colors: Purple and gold

NCAA regional champions
- 2001, 2004, 2009, 2016, 2019, 2021, 2022

NCAA tournament appearances
- 1964, 1966, 1968, 1970, 1974, 1977, 1980, 1982, 1984, 1987, 1989, 1990, 1991, 1993, 1999, 2000, 2001, 2002, 2003, 2004, 2005, 2007, 2008, 2009, 2011, 2012, 2015, 2016, 2018, 2019, 2021, 2022, 2023, 2024, 2025, 2026

Conference tournament champions
- ECAC South: 1982, 1984; CAA: 1987, 1989, 1990, 1991, 1993, 1999, 2000; CUSA: 2002; American: 2015, 2018, 2022, 2025, 2026

Conference regular season champions
- North State: 1955, 1956, 1959, 1960, 1961; SoCon: 1966, 1967, 1968, 1970, 1974, 1977; ECAC South: 1984, 1985; CAA: 1986, 1990, 2001; CUSA: 2004, 2009; American: 2019, 2021, 2022, 2023, 2024, 2026

The East Carolina Pirates baseball team is an intercollegiate baseball team representing East Carolina University in NCAA Division I college baseball and participates as a full member of the American Conference. The Pirates have made regular appearances in the NCAA tournament. As of 2026, they have the most NCAA tournament appearances without a College World Series appearance.

The Pirates are coached by Cliff Godwin and play their home games at Clark-LeClair Stadium, named after donor and alumnus Bill Clark and former coach Keith LeClair. Every year, the Pirates host a baseball tournament in Greenville in honor of Coach LeClair called the Keith LeClair Classic.

== History ==
=== Conference ===
- 1948–1962: North State
- 1963–1965: Independent
- 1966–1977: Southern Conference
- 1978–1981: Independent
- 1982–1985: ECAC South
- 1986–2001: Colonial Athletic Association
- 2002–2014: Conference USA
- 2015–present: American Conference

=== Head coaches ===
Tenure	Coach	Years	Record	Pct.
1932	R.C. Deal	1	1-5-0	.167
1933	Kenneth Beatty	1	3-3-0	.500
1934	A. D. Frank	1	5-8-0	.385
1935	Doc Mathis	1	7-7-1	.500
1936–1938	Bo Farley	3 (4)	32-11-3	.728
1939	Gordon Gilbert	1	6-5-0	.545
1940	Bo Farley	1 (4)	5-4-1	.550
1941-1942	John Christenbury	2	13-11-0	.542
1946	Earl Smith	1	7-4-0	.636
1947	John Cameron	1	11-7-0	.611
1948	James Johnson	1	5-10-1	.344
1949–1953	Jack Boone	5	49-39-1	.556
1954–1962	James Mallory	9 (10)	146-52-0	.737
1963–1972	Earl Smith	10	186-102-2	.645
1973	James Mallory	1 (10)	16-8-0	.667
1974–1976	George Williams	3	56-32-0	.636
1977–1979	Monte Little	3	82-49-0	.626
1980–1984	Hal Baird	5	145-66-1	.686
1985–1997	Gary Overton	13	427-237-1	.643
1998–2002	Keith LeClair	5	212-96-1	.688
2003–2005	Randy Mazey	3	120-66-1	.644
2006–2014	Billy Godwin	9	317-214-1	.597
2015–present	Cliff Godwin	12	470-238-2	.663
Totals	21 coaches	92 seasons	2321-1274-16	.645

* 1943–1945 No Games Played

== Stadium ==
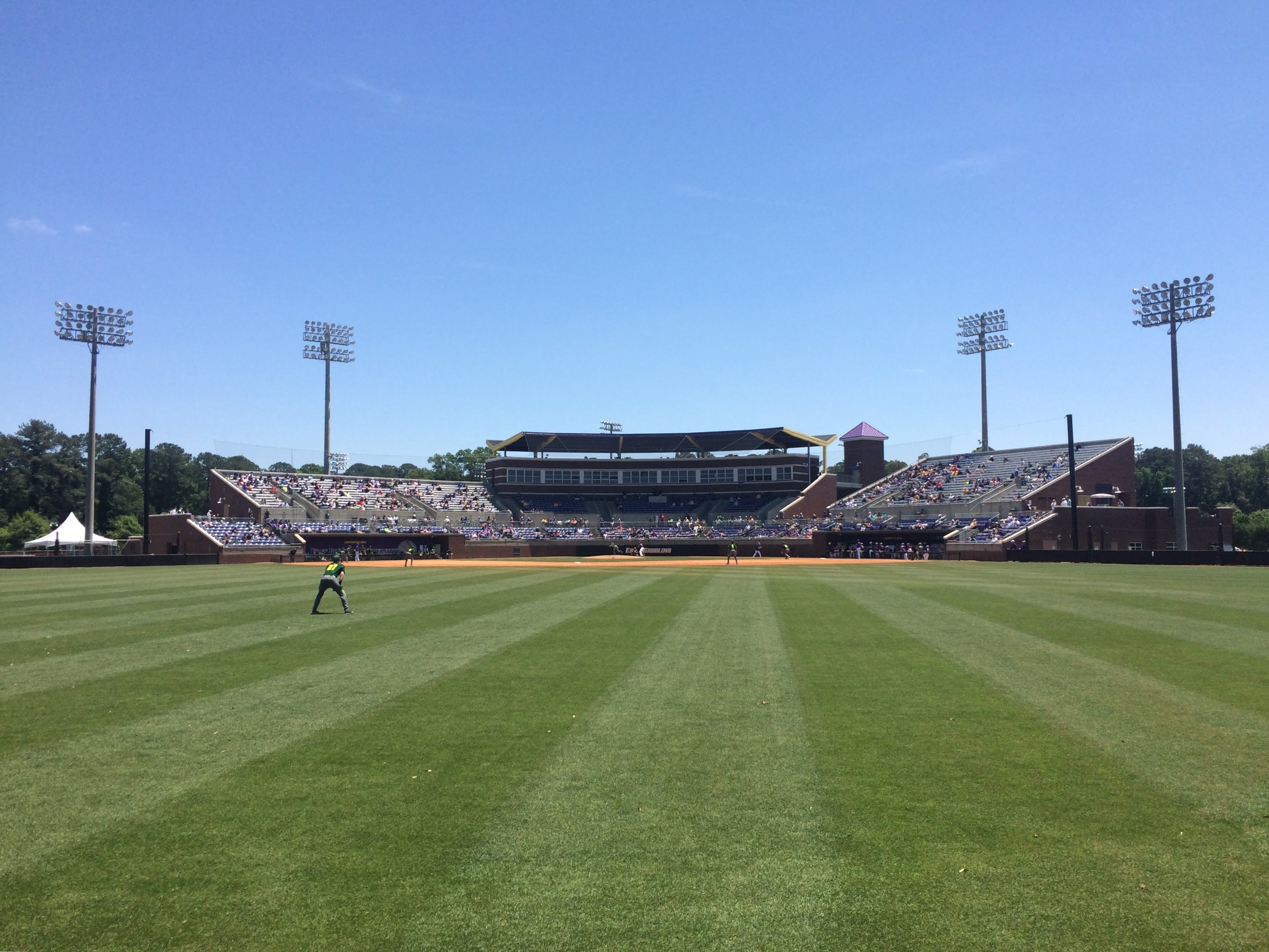
Clark-LeClair Stadium

Clark-LeClair Stadium is the home of Pirate baseball at East Carolina University in Greenville, North Carolina. The stadium was named after Pirate alumnus and key contributor Bill Clark and former Pirate skipper Keith LeClair.

The stadium has 3,000 Stadium bleacher seats, plus space for several thousand more spectators in "The Jungle". There are concession and restroom facilities at the stadium plus a family picnic area. Amenities include the Pirate Club fundraising and hospitality suite and a private suite for the LeClair family.

The stadium is home to the ECU Invitational and the Keith LeClair Classic.

== Year-by-year results ==
National champions	College World Series berth	NCAA Tournament berth	Conference Tournament Champions	Conference/Division Regular Season Champions

Season	Head coach	Conference	Season results									Tournament results		Final poll (Note: Collegiate Baseball began team rankings in 1959. Baseball America began during the 1981 season.)		
Season	Head coach	Conference	Overall				Conference					Conference	Postseason	BA	CB	Coaches
Season	Head coach	Conference	Wins	Losses	Ties	%	Wins	Losses	Ties	%	Finish	Conference	Postseason	BA	CB	Coaches
East Carolina Pirates
1932	R. C. Deal	Independent	1	5	0	.167	—	—	—	—	—	—	—	—	—	—
1933	Kenneth Beatty	Independent	3	3	0	.500	—	—	—	—	—	—	—	—	—	—
1934	A. D. Frank	Independent	5	8	0	.385	—	—	—	—	—	—	—	—	—	—
1935	Doc Mathis	Independent	7	7	1	.500	—	—	—	—	—	—	—	—	—	—
1936	Bo Farley	Independent	6	4	1	.591	—	—	—	—	—	—	—	—	—	—
1937	Bo Farley	Independent	9	4	2	.667	—	—	—	—	—	—	—	—	—	—
1938	Bo Farley	Independent	17	3	0	.850	—	—	—	—	—	—	—	—	—	—
1939	Gordon Gilbert	Independent	6	5	0	.545	—	—	—	—	—	—	—	—	—	—
1940	Bo Farley	Independent	5	4	1	.550	—	—	—	—	—	—	—	—	—	—
1941	John Christenbury	Independent	6	4	0	.600	—	—	—	—	—	—	—	—	—	—
1942	John Christenbury	Independent	7	7	0	.500	—	—	—	—	—	—	—	—	—	—
1943	No games played															
1944	No games played															
1945	No games played															
1946	Earl Smith	Independent	7	4	0	.636	—	—	—	—	—	—	—	—	—	—
1947	John Cameron	Independent	11	7	0	.611	—	—	—	—	—	—	—	—	—	—
1948	James Johnson	North State	5	10	1	.344	3	7	1	.318	—	—	—	—	—	—
1949	Jack Boone	North State	6	8	0	.429	4	6	0	.400	—	—	—	—	—	—
1950	Jack Boone	North State	7	7	1	.500	—	—	—	—	—	—	—	—	—	—
1951	Jack Boone	North State	11	10	0	.524	—	—	—	—	—	—	—	—	—	—
1952	Jack Boone	North State	9	9	0	.500	—	—	—	—	—	—	—	—	—	—
1953	Jack Boone	North State	16	5	0	.762	—	—	—	—	—	—	—	—	—	—
1954	James Mallory	North State	15	7	0	.682	—	—	—	—	—	—	—	—	—	—
1955	James Mallory	North State	20	5	0	.800	—	—	—	—	1st	—	—	—	—	—
1956	James Mallory	North State	18	5	0	.783	—	—	—	—	1st	—	—	—	—	—
1957	James Mallory	North State	16	7	0	.696	—	—	—	—	—	—	—	—	—	—
1958	James Mallory	North State	10	6	0	.625	—	—	—	—	—	—	—	—	—	—
1959	James Mallory	North State	16	3	0	.842	—	—	—	—	1st	—	—	—	—	—
1960	James Mallory	North State	17	5	0	.773	—	—	—	—	1st	—	—	—	—	—
1961	James Mallory	North State	23	4	0	.852	—	—	—	—	1st	—	NAIA National Championship	—	—	—
1962	James Mallory	North State	11	10	0	.524	—	—	—	—	—	—	—	—	—	—
1963	Earl Smith	Independent	25	6	1	.797	—	—	—	—	—	—	NAIA World Series	—	—	—
1964	Earl Smith	Independent	18	7	0	.720	—	—	—	—	—	—	District 3 Playoffs	—	23	—
1965	Earl Smith	Independent	16	7	0	.696	—	—	—	—	—	—	—	—	—	—
1966	Earl Smith	Southern Conference	17	10	0	.630	12	3	0	.800	1st	—	District 3 Playoffs	—	28	—
1967	Earl Smith	Southern Conference	23	6	0	.793	13	3	0	.813	T–1st	—	—	—	23	—
1968	Earl Smith	Southern Conference	21	11	1	.652	10	1	0	.909	1st	—	District 3 Playoffs	—	19	—
1969	Earl Smith	Southern Conference	15	14	0	.517	7	7	0	.500	3rd	—	—	—	—	—
1970	Earl Smith	Southern Conference	20	13	0	.606	13	6	0	.684	1st	—	District 3 Playoffs	—	25	—
1971	Earl Smith	Southern Conference	12	18	0	.400	7	5	0	.583	4th	—	—	—	—	—
1972	Earl Smith	Southern Conference	19	10	0	.655	11	5	0	.688	2nd	—	—	—	—	—
1973	James Mallory	Southern Conference	16	8	0	.667	10	4	0	.714	T–2nd	—	—	—	—	—
1974	George Williams	Southern Conference	17	13	0	.567	12	2	0	.857	1st	—	District 3 Playoffs	—	25	—
1975	George Williams	Southern Conference	17	12	0	.586	9	5	0	.643	3rd	—	—	—	—	—
1976	George Williams	Southern Conference	22	7	0	.759	7	6	0	.538	4th	—	—	—	—	—
1977	Monte Little	Southern Conference	30	12	0	.714	15	1	0	.938	1st	—	Atlantic Regional	—	—	—
1978	Monte Little	Independent	27	18	0	.600	—	—	—	—	—	—	—	—	—	—
1979	Monte Little	Independent	25	19	0	.568	—	—	—	—	—	—	—	—	—	—
1980	Hal Baird	Independent	28	7	0	.800	—	—	—	—	—	—	Northeast Regional	—	—	—
1981	Hal Baird	Independent	28	15	0	.651	—	—	—	—	—	—	—	—	—	—
1982	Hal Baird	ECAC South	34	14	0	.708	6	3	0	.667	3rd	1st	East Regional	—	—	—
1983	Hal Baird	ECAC South	21	17	1	.551	2	3	1	.417	—	—	—	—	—	—
1984	Hal Baird	ECAC South	34	13	0	.723	7	2	0	.778	1st	1st	South I Regional	—	20	—
1985	Gary Overton	ECAC South	32	14	0	.696	12	4	0	.750	1st	—	—	—	—	—
1986	Gary Overton	CAA	40	10	0	.800	13	5	0	.722	T–1st	—	—	—	—	—
1987	Gary Overton	CAA	26	17	0	.605	8	7	0	.333	4th	1st	Atlantic Regional			
1988	Gary Overton	CAA	33	14	0	.702	8	6	0	.571	T–2nd	—	—	—	—	—
1989	Gary Overton	CAA	37	11	0	.771	12	3	0	.800	2nd	1st	East Regional	—	—	—
1990	Gary Overton	CAA	47	9	0	.839	11	2	0	.333	1st	1st	Atlantic Regional	—	—	—
1991	Gary Overton	CAA	30	24	1	.555	9	8	0	.529	3rd	1st	Midwest Regional	—	—	—
1992	Gary Overton	CAA	25	24	0	.510	7	10	0	.412	5th	—	—	—	—	—
1993	Gary Overton	CAA	41	19	0	.683	11	7	0	.611	3rd	1st	Atlantic Regional	—	—	—
1994	Gary Overton	CAA	36	18	0	.667	8	9	0	.471	5th	—	—	—	—	—
1995	Gary Overton	CAA	29	26	0	.527	5	13	0	.278	6th	—	—	—	—	—
1996	Gary Overton	CAA	22	24	0	.478	10	11	0	.476	5th	—	—	—	—	—
1997	Gary Overton	CAA	29	27	0	.518	10	11	0	.476	T–4th	—	—	—	—	—
1998	Keith LeClair	CAA	30	29	0	.508	10	11	0	.476	T–4th	—	—	—	—	—
1999	Keith LeClair	CAA	46	16	0	.742	14	6	0	.700	2nd	1st	Baton Rouge Regional	18	19	23
2000	Keith LeClair	CAA	46	18	0	.719	14	7	0	.667	T–1st	1st	Columbia Regional	—	29	—
2001	Keith LeClair	CAA	47	13	0	.783	19	2	0	.905	1st	—	Kinston Super Regional	11	11	11
2002	Keith LeClair	CUSA	43	20	1	.680	16	13	1	.550	6th	1st	Columbia Regional	—	—	24
2003	Randy Mazey	CUSA	34	27	1	.556	17	13	0	.567	5th	—	Atlanta Regional	—	—	—
2004	Randy Mazey	CUSA	51	13	0	.797	25	5	0	.833	1st	—	Columbia Super Regional	8	13	9
2005	Randy Mazey	CUSA	35	26	0	.574	18	12	0	.600	4th	—	Tempe Regional	—	—	—
2006	Billy Godwin	CUSA	33	26	0	.559	10	14	0	.417	6th	—	—	—	—	—
2007	Billy Godwin	CUSA	40	23	0	.635	14	9	0	.609	2nd	2nd	Chapel Hill Regional	—	—	—
2008	Billy Godwin	CUSA	42	21	0	.667	13	11	0	.542	5th	—	Conway Regional	—	—	—
2009	Billy Godwin	CUSA	46	20	0	.697	17	7	0	.708	1st	—	Chapel Hill Super Regional	17	16	15
2010	Billy Godwin	CUSA	15	27	0	.357	11	13	0	.458	6th	—	—	—	—	—
2011	Billy Godwin	CUSA	41	21	0	.661	14	10	0	.583	3rd	—	Charlottesville Regional	25	—	—
2012	Billy Godwin	CUSA	36	24	1	.598	13	10	1	.563	6th	—	Chapel Hill Regional	—	—	—
2013	Billy Godwin	CUSA	31	26	0	.544	14	10	0	.583	3rd	—	—	—	—	—
2014	Billy Godwin	CUSA	33	26	0	.559	16	14	0	.533	6th	—	—	—	—	—
2015	Cliff Godwin	AAC	40	22	0	.645	15	9	0	.625	2nd	1st	Coral Gables Regional	—	—	—
2016	Cliff Godwin	AAC	38	23	1	.621	15	8	1	.646	2nd	—	Lubbock Super Regional	15	15	16
2017	Cliff Godwin	AAC	32	28	0	.533	7	17	0	.333	8th	—	—	—	—	—
2018	Cliff Godwin	AAC	44	18	0	.710	14	10	0	.583	T–3rd	1st	Greenville Regional	23	29	23
2019	Cliff Godwin	AAC	47	18	0	.723	20	4	0	.833	1st	—	Louisville Super Regional	12	15	12
2020	Cliff Godwin	AAC	13	4	0	.765	0	0	0	–	—	Cancelled	Cancelled	24	—	—
2021	Cliff Godwin	AAC	44	17	0	.721	20	8	0	.714	1st	—	Nashville Super Regional	13	12	13
2022	Cliff Godwin	AAC	46	21	0	.687	20	4	0	.833	1st	1st	Greenville Super Regional	17	13	12
2023	Cliff Godwin	AAC	47	19	0	.712	18	6	0	.750	1st	2nd	Charlottesville Regional	24	26	23
2024	Cliff Godwin	AAC	46	17	0	.730	19	8	0	.704	1st	—	Greenville Regional	16	—	16
2025	Cliff Godwin	AAC	35	27	0	.565	13	14	0	.481	T–5th	1st	Conway Regional	—	—	—
2026	Cliff Godwin	American	38	24	1	.611	17	10	0	.630	T–1st	1st	Chapel Hill Regional	—	—	—
Total			2,321	1,274	16	.645										

== NAIA tournament ==
In 1961, the Pirates won the NAIA World Series championship to claim their first national championship in baseball. The Pirates won 13–7 over the Sacramento State Hornets. Since then, the Pirates have yet to make it to a national championship.

== NCAA tournament ==
- The NCAA Division I baseball tournament started in 1947.
- The format of the tournament has changed through the years.

Year	Record	Pct	Notes
1964	1–2	.333	Lost to North Carolina in the District 3 Regional.
1966	0–2	.000	Lost to North Carolina in the District 3 Regional.
1968	1–2	.333	Lost to Florida State in the District 3 Regional.
1970	0–2	.000	Lost to Mississippi State in the District 3 Regional.
1974	0–2	.000	Lost to South Carolina in the District 3 Regional.
1977	0–2	.000	Lost to South Carolina in the Atlantic Regional.
1980	0–2	.000	Lost to Maine in the Northeast Regional.
1982	1–2	.333	Lost to West Virginia in the East Regional.
1984	2–2	.500	Lost to South Alabama in the South Regional.
1987	0–2	.000	Lost to Central Michigan in the Atlantic Regional.
1989	0–2	.000	Lost to Villanova in the East Regional.
1990	1–2	.333	Lost to N.C. State in the East Regional.
1991	1–2	.333	Lost to Ohio State in the Midwest Regional.
1993	1–2	.333	Lost to Ohio State in the Atlantic Regional.
1999	2–2	.500	Lost to LSU in the Baton Rouge Regional.
2000	2–2	.500	Lost to Louisiana–Lafayette in the Lafayette Regional.
2001	3–2	.600	Won Wilson Regional; Lost to Tennessee in the Kinston Super Regional.
2002	2–2	.500	Lost to Clemson in the Clemson Regional.
2003	1–2	.333	Lost to Stetson in the Atlanta Regional.
2004	3–2	.600	Won Kinston Regional; Lost to South Carolina in the Columbia Super Regional.
2005	0–2	.000	Lost to UNLV in the Tempe Regional.
2007	1–2	.333	Lost to Western Carolina in the Chapel Hill Regional.
2008	2–2	.500	Lost to Coastal Carolina in the Conway Regional.
2009	4–3	.571	Won Greenville Regional; Lost to North Carolina in the Chapel Hill Super Regional.
2011	2–2	.500	Lost to Virginia in the Charlottesville Regional Final.
2012	1–2	.333	Lost to North Carolina in the Chapel Hill Regional.
2015	0–2	.000	Lost to FIU in the Coral Gables Regional.
2016	4–2	.667	Won Charlottesville Regional; Lost to Texas Tech in the Lubbock Super Regional.
2018	1–2	.333	Lost to UNC Wilmington in the Greenville Regional.
2019	4–3	.571	Won Greenville Regional; Lost to Louisville in the Louisville Super Regional.
2021	3–2	.600	Won Greenville Regional; Lost to Vanderbilt in the Nashville Super Regional.
2022	4–3	.571	Won Greenville Regional; Lost to Texas in the Greenville Super Regional.
2023	2–2	.500	Lost to Virginia in Charlottesville Regional.
2024	3–2	.600	Lost to Evansville in Greenville Regional.
2025	2–2	.500	Lost to Coastal Carolina in Conway Regional.
2026	2–2	.500	Lost to North Carolina in Chapel Hill Regional.
Total	56–75	.427	

== Pirates in the Major Leagues ==
- Over the 5-year tenure of current head coach Cliff Godwin, 14 Pirates have been drafted.
- Since the MLB draft began in 1965, 3 Pirates have been selected in the first round: Pat Watkins was selected 32nd in 1993, Jeff Hoffman was selected 9th in 2014, and Trey Yesavage was selected 20th in 2024.
- A total of 22 Pirates have gone on to play in the MLB, 4 of which are active players.

Athlete	Years in MLB	MLB teams
Bill Holland	1937	Washington Senators
Bunky Stewart	1952–1956	Washington Senators
Tim Talton	1966–1967	Kansas City Athletics
Floyd Wicker	1968–1971	St. Louis Cardinals, Montreal Expos, Milwaukee Brewers, San Francisco Giants
Vince Colbert	1970–1972	Cleveland Indians
Tommy Toms	1975–1977	San Francisco Giants
Butch Davis	1983–1984, 1987–1989, 1991, 1993–1994	Kansas City Royals, Pittsburgh Pirates, Baltimore Orioles, Los Angeles Dodgers, Texas Rangers
Bob Patterson	1985–1987, 1989–1998	San Diego Padres, Pittsburgh Pirates, Texas Rangers, California Angels, Chicago Cubs
Bob Davidson	1989	New York Yankees
Mike Christopher	1991–1993, 1995–1996	Los Angeles Dodgers, Cleveland Indians, Detroit Tigers
Pat Watkins	1997–1999	Cincinnati Reds, Colorado Rockies
Chad Tracy	2004–2010, 2012–2013	Arizona Diamondbacks, Chicago Cubs, Florida Marlins, Washington Nationals
Sam Narron	2004	Texas Rangers
Seth Maness	2013–2017	St. Louis Cardinals, Kansas City Royals
Chris Heston	2014–2017	San Francisco Giants, Seattle Mariners, Minnesota Twins
Mike Wright	2015–2021	Baltimore Orioles, Seattle Mariners, Chicago White Sox
Shawn Armstrong	2015–present	Cleveland Indians, Seattle Mariners, Baltimore Orioles, Tampa Bay Rays, Miami Marlins, St. Louis Cardinals, Chicago Cubs, Texas Rangers
Jeff Hoffman	2016–present	Colorado Rockies, Cincinnati Reds, Philadelphia Phillies, Toronto Blue Jays
Jharel Cotton	2016–2017, 2021–2022	Oakland Athletics, Texas Rangers, Minnesota Twins, San Francisco Giants
Jack Reinheimer	2017–2018	Arizona Diamondbacks, New York Mets
Alec Burleson	2022–present	St. Louis Cardinals
Gavin Williams	2023–present	Cleveland Guardians
Connor Norby	2024–present	Baltimore Orioles, Miami Marlins
Trey Yesavage	2025–present	Toronto Blue Jays

== See also ==
- List of NCAA Division I baseball programs
- Conference USA baseball tournament
- American Conference baseball tournament
