= 2018 American Athletic Conference baseball tournament =

American college baseball tournament

- Tournament Logo
- Teams: 8
- Format: Double-elimination tournament
- Finals site: Spectrum Field; Clearwater, FL
- Champions: East Carolina (2nd title)
- Winning coach: Cliff Godwin (2nd title)
- MVP: Spencer Brickhouse (East Carolina)
- Television: YouTube & Facebook

2018 American Athletic Conference baseball standings
	Conf.						Overall
Team	W		L		T	PCT	W		L		T	PCT
Houston ‍‍‍^{y}	16	–	8	–	0	.667	33	–	21	–	0	.611
South Florida ‍‍‍^{y}	14	–	9	–	1	.604	32	–	18	–	1	.637
Connecticut ‍‍‍^{y}	14	–	10	–	0	.583	37	–	22	–	1	.625
East Carolina ‍‍‡‍^{y}	14	–	10	–	0	.583	39	–	15	–	0	.722
UCF ‍‍‍	13	–	10	–	0	.565	35	–	19	–	0	.648
Cincinnati ‍‍‍	12	–	12	–	0	.500	28	–	26	–	0	.519
Wichita State ‍‍‍	9	–	14	–	1	.396	34	–	19	–	1	.639
Tulane ‍‍‍	9	–	14	–	0	.391	24	–	31	–	0	.436
Memphis ‍‍‍	5	–	19	–	0	.208	20	–	36	–	0	.357
‡ – Tournament champion y – Invited to the NCAA tournament As of May 20, 2018; Rankings from Collegiate Baseball

The 2018 American Athletic Conference baseball tournament was scheduled to be held at Spectrum Field in Clearwater, Florida, from May 22 through 26. Anticipated weather forced a truncated schedule causing the event to be condensed, and the title game was played on May 25. The event, held at the end of the conference regular season, determines the champion of the American Athletic Conference for the 2018 season. East Carolina won the double-elimination tournament and received the conference's automatic bid to the 2018 NCAA Division I baseball tournament.

== Format and seeding ==
The top eight baseball teams in The American were seeded based on their records in conference play. The tournament used a two-bracket double-elimination format, which led to a single championship game between the winners of each bracket.

Team	W	L	T	Pct.	Seed	Tiebreaker
Houston	16	8		.667	1	
South Florida	14	9	1	.609	2	
Connecticut	14	10		.583	3	2–1 vs ECU
East Carolina	14	10		.583	4	
UCF	13	10		.565	5	2–1 vs Cincinnati
Cincinnati	12	12		.500	6	
Wichita State	9	14	1	.391	7	2–1 vs Tulane
Tulane	9	14		.391	8	
Memphis	5	19		.208		

== Bracket ==
First round
1	Houston	6
8	Tulane	11
4	East Carolina	8
5	UCF	4
5	UCF	2
1	Houston	6
2	South Florida	2
7	Wichita State	4
3	Connecticut	6
6	Cincinnati	2
6	Cincinnati	4
2	South Florida	9

Second round
8	Tulane	5
4	East Carolina	6
8	Tulane	7
1	Houston	18
7	Wichita State	5
3	Connecticut	7
2	South Florida	7
7	Wichita State	2

Semifinals
4	East Carolina	3	12^{7}
1	Houston	5	1
3	Connecticut	0	3
2	South Florida	13	2

Finals
4	East Carolina	4
3	Connecticut	3

== All-Tournament Team ==
The following players were named to the All-Tournament Team.

Pos	Name	School
P	Jacob Wallace	Connecticut
P	Colin Sullivan	South Florida
P	Jake Kuchmaner	East Carolina
C	Tyler Dietrich	South Florida
IF	Spencer Brickhouse	East Carolina
IF	Turner Brown	East Carolina
IF	Anthony Prato	Connecticut
IF	Coco Montes	South Florida
OF	Troy Stefanski	Connecticut
OF	Drew Henrickson	East Carolina
OF	Grant Witherspoon	Tulane
UTY	Joe Davis	Houston

== Most Outstanding Player ==
Spencer Brickhouse, East Carolina
