= Cliff Godwin =

American baseball player and coach

Current position
- Title: Head coach
- Team: East Carolina
- Conference: The American
- Record: 469–238–2

Biographical details
- Born: February 2, 1978 (age 48); Snow Hill, North Carolina, U.S.

Playing career
- 1998–2001: East Carolina
- 2001: Evansville Otters
- 2001–2002: Gateway Grizzlies
- Position: Catcher

Coaching career (HC unless noted)
- 2003: Kinston HS (asst.)
- 2004: UNC Wilmington (asst.)
- 2005: Vanderbilt (asst.)
- 2006: Notre Dame (asst.)
- 2007–2008: LSU (asst.)
- 2009–2011: UCF (asst.)
- 2012–2014: Ole Miss (asst.)
- 2015–present: East Carolina

Head coaching record
- Overall: 469–238–2
- Tournaments: NCAA: 25–22

Accomplishments and honors

Championships
- 5× AAC Tournament (2015, 2018, 2022, 2025, 2026); 6× AAC regular season (2019, 2021–2024, 2026); 4x NCAA Regional Champion (2016, 2019, 2021, 2022)

Awards
- 5× AAC Coach of the Year (2015, 2019, 2021, 2022, 2024)

Clifford McKinley Godwin (born February 2, 1978) is an American baseball coach and former catcher, who is the current head baseball coach of the East Carolina Pirates. He played college baseball at East Carolina from 1998 to 2001 for head coach Keith LeClair.

== Early years ==
Godwin was raised in Snow Hill, North Carolina. He attended Greene Central High School in Snow Hill.

== Playing career ==
Godwin enrolled at East Carolina University to play for the Pirates. He red-shirted his freshman season. Over the next four years, he started 126 games as a catcher, and served three years as team co-captain. He batted .322 with 15 home runs and RBIs as a senior and was named 1st team All-Colonial Athletic Association.

In addition to his playing career at East Carolina, Godwin also graduated magna cum laude in 2000 with a Bachelor of Science in management information systems, and went on to earn his MBA from ECU in 2002. He was a two-time Academic All-American selection during his time as a player.

After graduating, Godwin spent two years playing professionally with the Gateway Grizzlies and the Evansville Otters of the Frontier League.

== Coaching career ==
After his two years in the Frontier League, Godwin began his coaching career as an assistant at Kinston High School in Kinston, North Carolina, 20 minutes from his hometown of Snow Hill. He spent one season at Kinston before moving on to his first position at the Division I level, with the UNC Wilmington Seahawks. He spent two seasons at UNC Wilmington before moving on to Vanderbilt.

At Vanderbilt, he served as the Commodores' Director of Baseball Operations before joining Paul Mainieri's staff at Notre Dame for the 2005 season. After two seasons at Notre Dame, he followed Mainieri to LSU prior to the 2007 season. In 2008, Godwin's LSU offense hit .306 with 100 home runs and 95 stolen bases.

After two seasons with Mainieri at LSU, which included a trip to the College World Series in 2008, Godwin coached at UCF. With UCF, he helped with numerous highly ranked recruiting classes and helped lead the Knights to the NCAA tournament in 2011, their first appearance since 2004. Following his stint at UCF, Godwin moved on to Ole Miss, where he served as an assistant coach and recruiting coordinator. In 2014, he helped lead the Rebels to their first College World Series appearance since 1972.

On June 25, 2014, Godwin was hired as head coach at his alma mater, East Carolina University, replacing former Pirates head coach Billy Godwin.

Godwin's first career game as a head coach came on February 13, 2015, a 3–1 loss to Virginia. His first win came on February 21, 2015, against UNC Greensboro.

On May 22, 2025, Godwin became the all-time winningest coach in East Carolina baseball history. Godwin's 428 wins surpassed the previous record of 427 set by Coach Gary Overton on May 16, 1997.

== Head coaching record ==
The following is a table of Godwin's yearly records as an NCAA head baseball coach.

Record table
Season	Team	Overall	Conference	Standing	Postseason
East Carolina Pirates (American Athletic Conference) (2015–present)
2015	East Carolina	40–22	15–9	2nd	Coral Gables Regional
2016	East Carolina	38–23–1	15–8–1	2nd	Lubbock Super Regional
2017	East Carolina	32–28	7–17	8th	
2018	East Carolina	44–18	14–10	4th	Greenville Regional
2019	East Carolina	47–18	20–4	1st	Louisville Super Regional
2020	East Carolina	13–4			Season canceled due to COVID-19
2021	East Carolina	44–17	20–8	1st	Nashville Super Regional
2022	East Carolina	46–21	20–4	1st	Greenville Super Regional
2023	East Carolina	47–19	18–6	1st	Charlottesville Regional
2024	East Carolina	46–17	19–8	1st	Greenville Regional
2025	East Carolina	35–27	13–14	T–5th	Conway Regional
2026	East Carolina	38–24–1	17–10	T–1st	Chapel Hill Regional
East Carolina:		469–238–2	177–97–1		
Total:		469–238–2			
National champion Postseason invitational champion Conference regular season champion Conference regular season and conference tournament champion Division regular season champion Division regular season and conference tournament champion Conference tournament champion
