= 2026 UTSA Roadrunners baseball team =

American college baseball season

2026 UTSA Roadrunners baseball

AAC regular season co-champions Bruce Bolt College Classic champions
- Conference: American Conference
- Record: 38–20 (17–10 American)
- Head coach: Patrick Hallmark (7th season)
- Assistant coaches: Michael Cavazos (2nd season); Zach Henry (1st season); Luke Malone (3rd season)
- Hitting coach: Ryan Aguayo (7th season)
- Pitching coach: Zach Butler (3rd season)
- Home stadium: Roadrunner Field

2026 American Conference baseball standings
	Conf.						Overall
Team	W		L		T	PCT	W		L		T	PCT
UTSA ‍†‍‍	17	–	10	–	0	.630	38	–	20	–	0	.655
East Carolina ‍†‍‡‍^{y}	17	–	10	–	0	.630	36	–	22	–	1	.619
Rice ‍‍‍	16	–	11	–	0	.593	35	–	24	–	0	.593
UAB ‍‍‍	15	–	12	–	0	.556	32	–	26	–	0	.552
Memphis ‍‍‍	13	–	14	–	0	.481	24	–	34	–	0	.414
Florida Atlantic ‍‍‍	12	–	15	–	0	.444	28	–	28	–	0	.500
Wichita State ‍‍‍	12	–	15	–	0	.444	31	–	29	–	0	.517
Charlotte ‍‍‍	12	–	15	–	0	.444	28	–	28	–	0	.500
South Florida ‍‍‍	11	–	16	–	0	.407	32	–	21	–	0	.604
Tulane ‍‍‍	10	–	17	–	0	.370	25	–	31	–	0	.446
† – Conference champion ‡ – Tournament champion y – Invited to the NCAA tournament As of May 26, 2026; Rankings from D1Baseball

The 2026 UTSA Roadrunners baseball team represented the University of Texas at San Antonio during the 2026 NCAA Division I baseball season. The Roadrunners played their home games at Roadrunner Field as a member of the American Conference. They were led by seventh-year head coach Patrick Hallmark. They concluded the season with a 38-20 record and tied with the East Carolina Pirates for regular season American Conference champions, but failed to improve on their 47-15 record in 2025. They were excluded from the 2026 NCAA Division I baseball tournament after widely being viewed as a bubble team.

== Previous season ==
The Roadrunners are coming off a 47–15 (23–4) season, which saw the program win the American Conference regular season. They did not win the AAC tournament, but received an at-large berth into the 2025 NCAA Division I baseball tournament as the two-seed in the Austin Regional. UTSA won the Regional, marking their first-ever regional title. The Roadrunners advanced to the Los Angeles Super Regional, where they lost 0–2 in a three-game-series to UCLA.

== Preseason ==
=== Coaches poll ===
The coaches poll was released on December 30, 2025. UTSA was selected to finish second in the conference.

Coaches' Poll
Predicted finish	Team	Points
1	East Carolina	75 (4)
2	UTSA	70 (4)
3	Charlotte	62
4	Tulane	57
5	South Florida	54
6	Florida Atlantic	45
7	Rice	45
8	Wichita State	24
9	Memphis	19
10	UAB	16

== Game log ==
2026 UTSA Roadrunners baseball game log (38–20)
Regular season (33–15)

February (9–1)
Date	TV	Opponent	Rank	Stadium	Score	Win	Loss	Save	Attendance	Overall	AAC	Source
February 13	ESPN+	South Dakota State*		Roadrunner Field; San Antonio, TX	**W** 17–4	**DeBattista** (1–0)	Madison (0–1)	None	953	1–0	—	Report
February 14	ESPN+	South Dakota State*		Roadrunner Field	**W** 13–5	**Qualia** (1–0)	Schlecht (0–1)	None	781	2–0	—	Report
February 15	ESPN+	South Dakota State*		Roadrunner Field	**W** 13–1	**Dove** (1–0)	Novotny (0–1)	None	890	3–0	—	Report
February 17	ESPN+	UIC*		Roadrunner Field	**W** 10–3	**Simmons** (1–0)	Buss (0–1)	None	756	4–0	—	Report
February 20	ESPN+	Dallas Baptist*		Roadrunner Field	**W** 12–8	**Simmons** (2–0)	Smith (1–1)	None	920	5–0	—	Report
February 21	ESPN+	Dallas Baptist*		Roadrunner Field	**W** 10–8	**Brown** (2–0)	Long (0–1)	**DeBattista** (1)	1,079	6–0	—	Report
February 22	ESPN+	Dallas Baptist*		Roadrunner Field	**W** 6–3	**Dove** (2–0)	Borberg (0–1)	**Brown** (1)	1,049	7–0	—	Report
February 24	ESPN+	at Texas State*		Bobcat Ballpark; San Marcos, TX	**L** 2–7	Targac (1–1)	**Okerholm** (0–1)	None	2,315	7–1	—	Report
Bruce Bolt College Classic
February 27	MLBN	vs. Ohio State*		Daikin Park; Houston, TX	**W** 6–5	**DeBattista** (2–0)	Sigman (1–1)	**Simmons** (1)	942	8–1	—	Report
February 28	MLBN	vs. No. 9 Coastal Carolina*		Daikin Park	**W** 16–10	**Qualia** (2–0)	Norman (1–2)	None	12,219	9–1	—	Report

March (11–8)
Date	TV	Opponent	Rank	Stadium	Score	Win	Loss	Save	Attendance	Overall	AAC	Source
Bruce Bolt College Classic
March 1	MLBN	vs. Baylor*		Clark–LeClair Stadium	**W** 11–6	**Myles** (1–0)	Hansen (0–2)	None	6,525	10–1	—	Report
March 4	ESPN+	at Texas A&M–Corpus Christi*	No. 25	Chapman Field; Corpus Christi, TX	**W** 7–5	**Simmons** (3–0)	Jacques (0–1)	None	410	11–1	—	Report
March 6	ESPN+	at New Mexico State*	No. 25	Presley Askew Field; Las Cruces, NM	**W** 10–2	**Kelley** (1–0)	Barnes (0–1)	None	881	12–1	—	Report
March 7	ESPN+	at New Mexico State*	No. 25	Presley Askew Field	**W** 13–0^{7}	**Myles** (1–0)	Price (0–1)	None	799	13–1	—	Report
March 8	ESPN+	at New Mexico State*	No. 25	Presley Askew Field	**L** 4–5	Wylde (3–0)	**Simmons** (3–1)	None	912	13–2	—	Report
March 10	B12N+	at Texas Tech*	No. 24	Rip Griffin Park; Lubbock, TX	**W** 9–8	**Simmons** (1–0)	Burns (1–1)	None	3,547	14–2	—	Report
March 11	B12N+	at Texas Tech*	No. 24	Rip Griffin Park	**L** 5–10	Jordan (2–0)	**Hubbard** (0–1)	None	3,657	14–3	—	Report
March 13	ESPN+	UT Arlington*	No. 24	Roadrunner Field	**L** 11–15	Dygert (2–0)	**Kelley** (1–1)	None	1,190	14–4	—	Report
March 14	ESPN+	UT Arlington*	No. 24	Roadrunner Field	**L** 8–11	Winkler (1–0)	**Myles** (2–1)	None	1,060	14–5	—	Report
March 15	ESPN+	UT Arlington*	No. 24	Roadrunner Field	**W** 15–8	**Antolick** (2–1)	Evans (0–2)	None	932	15–5	—	Report
March 17	ESPN+	at Houston Christian*		Husky Field; Houston, TX	**L** 11–12	Feltman (1–0)	**Qualia** (2–1)	Norton (1)	216	15–6	—	Report
March 20	ESPN+	at Florida Atlantic		FAU Baseball Stadium; Boca Raton, FL	**W** 4–1	**Brown** (2–0)	Litman (3–2)	**Simmons** (1)	489	16–6	1–0	Report
March 21	ESPN+	at Florida Atlantic		FAU Baseball Stadium	**L** 6–7	Kimball (1–0)	**DeBattista** (2–1)	None	476	16–7	1–1	Report
March 22	ESPN+	at Florida Atlantic		FAU Baseball Stadium	**W** 18–8^{7}	**Dove** (3–0)	Grant (1–1)	None	415	17–7	2–1	Report
March 24	ESPN+	Texas A&M–Corpus Christi*		Roadrunner Field	**W** 3–1	**Simmons** (6–1)	Robertson (0–1)	None	1,140	18–7	—	Report
March 27	ESPN+	East Carolina		Roadrunner Field; San Antonio, TX	**L** 0–3	Norby (3–1)	**Okerholm** (0–2)	Webb (1)	1,205	18–8	2–2	Report
March 28	ESPN+	East Carolina		Roadrunner Field	**W** 6–1	**Myles** (3–1)	Towers (2–1)	**Simmons** (3)	1,174	19–8	3–2	Report
March 29	ESPN+	East Carolina		Roadrunner Field	**W** 8–7^{10}	**Demont** (1–0)	Webb (2–3)	None	992	20–8	4–2	Report
March 31	ESPN+	at Incarnate Word*		Daniel J. Sullivan IV Field; San Antonio, TX	**L** 11–13	Huspen (1–0)	**DeBattista** (2–2)	None	77	20–9	—	Report

April (10–5)
Date	TV	Opponent	Rank	Stadium	Score	Win	Loss	Save	Attendance	Overall	AAC	Source
April 2	ESPN+	at Rice		Reckling Park; Houston, TX	**L** 2–3^{10}	Sharp (3–1)	**Simmons** (6–2)	None	1,519	20–10	4–3	Report
April 3	ESPN+	at Rice		Reckling Park	**W** 8–0	**Myles** (4–1)	Sanders (1–4)	None	1,476	21–10	5–3	Report
April 4	ESPN+	at Rice		Reckling Park	**W** 13–0^{7}	**Gutierrez** (1–0)	Thames (2–2)	None	1,516	22–10	6–3	Report
April 7	ESPN+	at Tarleton State*		Cecil Ballow Baseball Complex; Stephenville, TX	**W** 6–2	**Hubbard** (1–1)	Bassett (1–2)	None	440	23–10	—	Report
April 10	ESPN+	South Florida		Roadrunner Field	**W** 11–3	**Kelley** (2–1)	Alicea (5–3)	None	810	24–10	7–3	Report
April 11	ESPN+	South Florida		Roadrunner Field	**W** 7–3	**Myles** (5–1)	Senay (6–1)	None	847	25–10	8–3	Report
April 12	ESPN+	South Florida		Roadrunner Field	**L** 1–7	Smith (4–1)	**Gutierrez** (1–1)	Sutton (7)	876	25–11	8–4	Report
April 14	B12N+	at Baylor*		Baylor Ballpark; Waco, TX	**L** 9–10^{12}	DeVasher (1–1)	**Simmons** (6–3)	None	2,088	25–12	—	Report
April 17	ESPN+	Charlotte		Roadrunner Field	**W** 11–5	**Kelley** (3–1)	Cooper (3–3)	None	918	26–12	9–4	Report
April 18	ESPN+	Charlotte		Roadrunner Field	**W** 11–5	**Myles** (6–1)	Combs (1–1)	**Simmons** (4)	943	27–12	10–4	Report
April 19	ESPN+	Charlotte		Roadrunner Field	**L** 5–7	Stanton (2–1)	**Dove** (3–1)	Munn (1)	895	27–13	10–5	Report
April 21	SECN+	at No. 7 Texas A&M*		Blue Bell Park; College Station, TX	**Canceled (inclement weather)**							
April 24	ESPNU	at Tulane		Turchin Stadium; New Orleans, LA	**W** 7–3	**Kelley** (4–1)	Cehajic (2–5)	None	1,514	28–13	11–5	Report
April 25	ESPN+	at Tulane		Turchin Stadium	**W** 8–2	**Myles** (7–1)	Toporek (1–4)	**DeMont** (1)	1,512	29–13	12–5	Report
April 26	ESPN+	at Tulane		Turchin Stadium	**L** 7–12	Vincent (2–2)	**Gutierrez** (1–2)	Larson (1)	1,508	29–14	12–6	Report
April 28	ESPN+	Incarnate Word*		Roadrunner Field	**W** 22–10^{7}	**Simmons** (7–3)	Crispin (0–1)	None	1,186	30–14	—	Report

May (6–5)
Date	TV	Opponent	Rank	Stadium	Score	Win	Loss	Save	Attendance	Overall	AAC	Source
May 1	ESPN+	Wichita State		Roadrunner Field	**W** 13–7	**Kelley** (5–1)	Pacha (3–1)	None	972	31–14	13–6	Report
May 2	ESPN+	Wichita State		Roadrunner Field	**W** 8–1	**Myles** (8–1)	Hamilton (3–6)	**DeBattista** (2)	1,027	32–14	14–6	Report
May 3	ESPN+	Wichita State		Roadrunner Field	**W** 6–3	**Qualia** (3–1)	Nuanez (4–2)	**Simmons** (5)	1,079	33–14	15–6	Report
May 5	SECN+	at No. 4 Texas*		UFCU Disch–Falk Field; Austin, TX	**L** 8–11	Walls (2–0)	**Simmons** (7–4)	Burns (4)	7,437	33–15	—	Report
May 8	ESPN+	at Memphis		FedExPark; Memphis, TN	**L** 4–6	Robinson (2–0)	**Kelley** (5–2)	Fair (10)	613	33–16	15–7	Report
May 9	ESPN+	at Memphis		FedExPark	**W** 9–2	**Myles** (9–1)	Case (5–7)	None	625	34–16	16–7	Report
May 10	ESPN+	at Memphis		FedExPark	**L** 5–10	Rushing (2–3)	**DeBattista** (2–3)	None	576	34–17	16–8	Report
May 12	ESPN+	Texas State*		Roadrunner Field	**W** 19–4^{7}	**Dove** (4–1)	Targac (2–4)	None	1,585	35–17	—	Report
May 14	ESPN+	UAB		Roadrunner Field	**L** 6–7	Steele (6–3)	**Gutierrez** (1–3)	Ingram (3)	928	35–18	16–9	Report
May 15	ESPN+	UAB		Roadrunner Field	**W** 19–9^{7}	**DeBattista** (3–3)	Keplinger (2–1)	None	1,135	36–18	17–9	Report
May 16	ESPN+	UAB		Roadrunner Field	**L** 11–23^{8}	Miller (4–0)	**Qualia** (3–2)	None	852	36–19	17–10	Report

Postseason (2–1)

American tournament (2–1)
Date	TV	Opponent	Rank	Stadium	Score	Win	Loss	Save	Attendance	Overall	AACT Record	Source
May 22	ESPN+	vs. (5) Memphis	(1)	BayCare Ballpark; Clearwater, FL	**W** 4–0	**Myles** (10–1)	Garner (1–6)	**Kelley** (1)	219	37–19	1–0	Report
May 23	ESPN+	vs. (2) East Carolina	(1)	BayCare Ballpark	**W** 4–2	**Simmons** (8–4)	Rose (3–2)	**Kelley** (2)		38–19	2–0	Report
May 24	ESPNews	vs. (2) East Carolina	(1)	BayCare Ballpark	**L** 0–1	Norby (7–3)	**DeBattista** (3–4)	Hoagland (1)		38–20	2–1	Report

Legend: = Win = Loss = Tie = Canceled
Bold = UTSA team member * Non-conference game
Rankings are based on the team's current ranking in the D1Baseball poll.

Schedule Notes

== Rankings ==
Ranking movements Legend: ██ Increase in ranking ██ Decrease in ranking — = Not ranked RV = Received votes
	Week																	
Poll	Pre	1	2	3	4	5	6	7	8	9	10	11	12	13	14	15	16	Final
Coaches'	—	—*	RV	RV	RV	RV	—	—	RV	RV	RV	RV	RV	RV	RV	—	—*	
Baseball America	—	—	—	—	24	—	—	—	—	—	—	—	—	—	—	—*	—*	
NCBWA†	—	—	RV	—	RV	—	—	—	RV	RV	RV	RV	RV	RV	RV	RV*	RV	
D1Baseball	—	—	—	25	24	—	—	—	—	—	—	—	—	—	—	—	—*	
Perfect Game	—	—	23	18	18	—	—	—	—	—	—	—	—	—	—	—*	—*	

† NCBWA ranks 30 teams in their preseason poll, but only ranks 25 teams weekly during the season.
* A new poll was not released for this week, so for comparison purposes, the previous week's ranking is inserted in this week's slot.
