= Clark–LeClair Stadium =

Baseball park in Greenville, North Carolina

Clark-LeClair Stadium
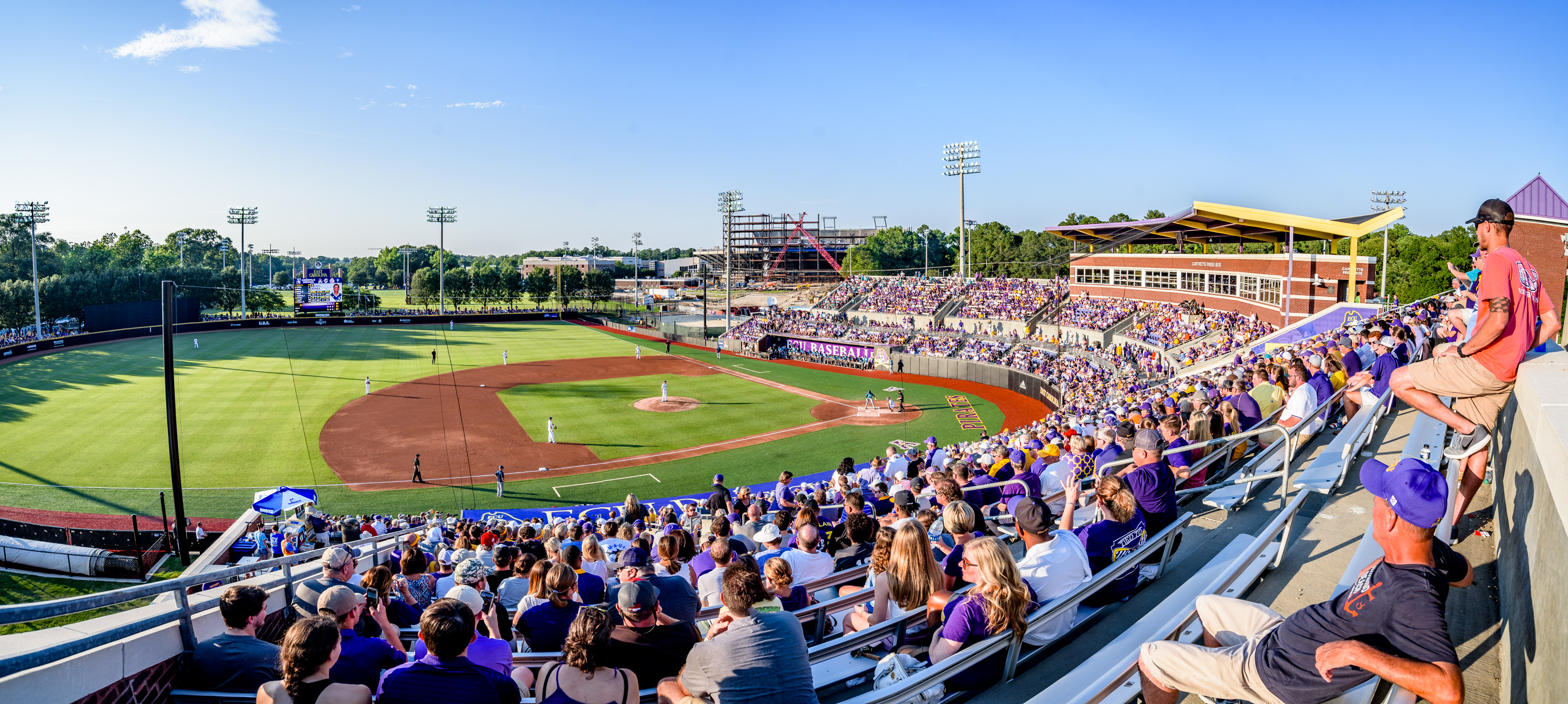
- A view from the third base bleachers in 2018
- Interactive map of Clark-LeClair Stadium
- Full name: Lewis Field at Clark-LeClair Stadium
- Location: 9999 Charles Boulevard; Greenville, North Carolina
- Coordinates: 35.5933°N 77.3673°W
- Owner: East Carolina University
- Operator: East Carolina University
- Capacity: 6,000
- Surface: Bermuda Turf
- Record attendance: 6,054 vs NC State (April 23, 2024)
- Field size: Left: 320 feet (98 m); Center: 390 feet (119 m); Right: 320 feet (98 m)

Construction
- Built: 2004–05
- Opened: March 4, 2005
- Cost: $11 million
- Architects: Walter, Robbs, Callahan & Pierce

Tenants
- East Carolina Pirates (NCAA) (2005–present); C-USA tournament (2007)

Greenville (the United States)
Greenville (North Carolina)

Clark–LeClair Stadium is a baseball park located on the campus of East Carolina University in Greenville, North Carolina. It is the home field of the East Carolina Pirates of the American Athletic Conference. The stadium was named after Pirate alumnus and contributor Bill Clark and former Pirates coach Keith LeClair. ECU's current head coach is Cliff Godwin.

The stadium has 3,000 stadium bleacher seats, plus space for several thousand more spectators in "The Jungle." There are concession and restroom facilities at the stadium, plus a family picnic area. Amenities include the Pirate Club fundraising and hospitality suite and a private suite for the LeClair family. The venue was built with $11 million in private donations.

The playing surface consists of Celebration Bermuda turf with a clay base infield and crushed-brick warning track. Facilities include indoor and outdoor batting cages, a VIP booth, coaches' offices, and a player clubhouse, as well as state-of-the-art broadcast facilities. Before the 2017 season, an updated scoreboard and sound system was installed. In 2019, a 7,125-square foot hitting facility was completed along the right field line at a cost of $1 million. In 2024 a new LED lighting system was installed prior to the season to "improve visibility and lower maintenance costs."

The dimensions of the outfield are 320 feet (98 m) down the foul lines and 400 feet (122 m) to center field. The diamond has an unorthodox northwesterly alignment (home plate to center field); the recommended orientation is east-northeast. The elevation of the field is approximately 70 feet (21 m) above sea level.

The stadium is home to the 2007 ECU Invitational and Keith LeClair Classic The Pirates consistently rank in the top thirty among Division I baseball programs in attendance.

== Events ==
The stadium hosted the Conference USA tournament in 2007, won by Rice, the Regionals of the NCAA tournament in 2009, 2018, 2019, 2021, 2022 and 2022 Super Regional.

== Facts ==
- Largest crowd — 6,054 vs NC State on April 23, 2024 won by East Carolina 10–6
- First game — ECU vs. Michigan on March 4, 2005, won by East Carolina 2–1.

== See also ==
- List of NCAA Division I baseball venues
