= BayCare Ballpark =

American baseball stadium

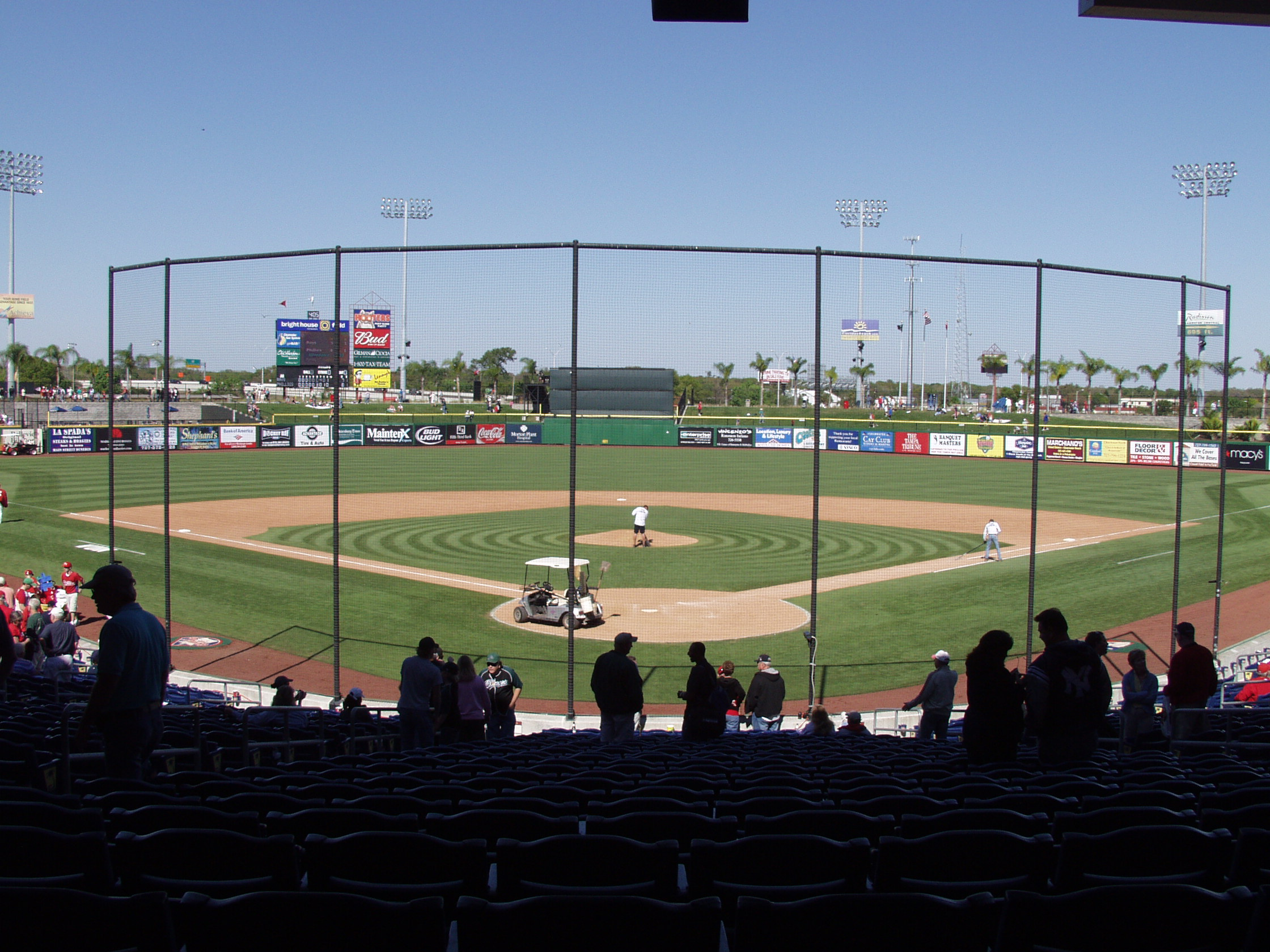

- Location within Florida Location within the United States
- Interactive map of BayCare Ballpark
- Former names: Bright House Networks Field (2004–2013); Bright House Field (2013–2017); Spectrum Field (2017–2020)
- Location: 601 Old Coachman Road; Clearwater, Florida 33765
- Coordinates: 27°58′18″N 82°43′54″W
- Owner: City of Clearwater
- Operator: Philadelphia Phillies
- Capacity: 8,500
- Surface: Grass
- Field size: Left – 329 ft. Left Center – 389 ft. Center – 408 ft. Right – 330 ft.
- Public transit: PSTA bus: 76

Construction
- Groundbreaking: October 16, 2002
- Opened: February 27, 2004
- Cost: $28 million ($47.7 million in 2025 dollars)
- Architects: Populous; Ewing Cole Cherry Brott
- Project manager: Stranix Associates
- Services engineers: Bredson & Associates, Inc.
- General contractor: Hunt Construction Group

Tenants
- Clearwater Threshers (Florida State League) (2004–present); Philadelphia Phillies (MLB) (spring training) (2004–present); Big East tournament (2006, 2008–2013); AAC tournament (2014–present)

BayCare Ballpark is a baseball stadium located in Clearwater, Florida, United States. The stadium was built in 2004 and has a maximum seating capacity of 8,500 people (7,000 fixed seats with additional grass berm seating for 1,500).

The ballpark is the spring training home of the Philadelphia Phillies, and also the home of their Class A affiliate, the Clearwater Threshers of the Florida State League. A sculpture titled The Ace—by artist Kevin Brady—stands at the ballpark's west entrance plaza.

== Name ==
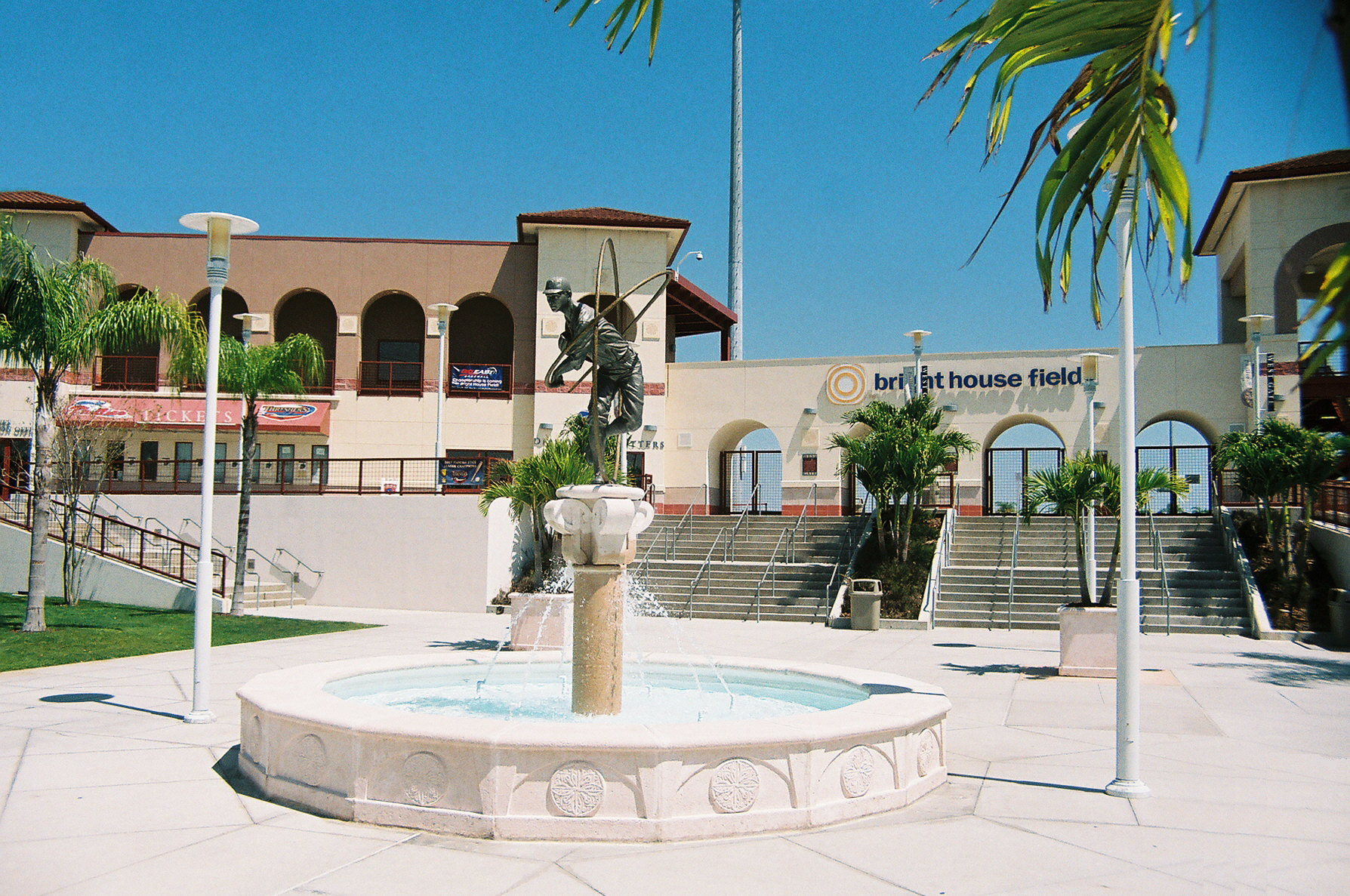
West entrance plaza, with The Ace by sculptor Kevin Brady

The stadium was originally named Bright House Networks Field after the regional / national cable company, Bright House Networks, whose local head end center is located just to the south of the stadium.

It was announced on January 20, 2004, that Bright House Networks had secured the naming rights for the new ballpark. Under the terms of the agreement, Bright House Networks would pay the Phillies $1.7 million over 10 years with an option for two 5-year renewals. The City of Clearwater received one-third of the payment. The name was shortened to Bright House Field in 2013.

In 2017, the complex was renamed Spectrum Field after Bright House was purchased by Charter Communications. While named for Charter's residential service, the name invoked memories of the Spectrum arena that operated from 1967 to 2009 at the South Philadelphia Sports Complex, which the Phillies have called home since 1971.

The name was changed to BayCare Ballpark in February 2021, when BayCare Health System reached a six-year naming-rights agreement with a five-year renewal option. BayCare Health System also became the exclusive healthcare system partner for the Phillies in the Florida market.

== History ==
The flooded field caused by the rains of Tropical Storm Debby

BayCare Ballpark is the Phillies' third Clearwater spring training home. The team moved to Clearwater in 1947. They trained and played home games at Clearwater Athletic Field from 1947 to 1954. The City of Clearwater opened a new ballpark for spring training in 1955 and named it Jack Russell Stadium. (The ballpark was renamed Jack Russell Memorial Stadium in 1990.) With the stadium aging, the Phillies and the city erected their new spring home adjacent to the Phillies' year-round training facility, the Carpenter Complex, 4 miles (6.4 km) east of Jack Russell Memorial Stadium.

Ground-breaking of the new stadium took place on October 16, 2002. The official ribbon-cutting ceremony for the ballpark took place on February 27, 2004, prior to the annual spring-training Phan Fest.

On June 24, 2012, thanks to the rain bands off Tropical Storm Debby, the field was flooded, becoming swimming pool-like.

== Significant games ==
The Phillies played their first spring-training game at the park on March 4, 2004. 8,205 fans watched the Phils beat the New York Yankees 5–1. Vicente Padilla started for the Phillies, Marlon Byrd had the park's first hit, and Jimmy Rollins hit the first home run.

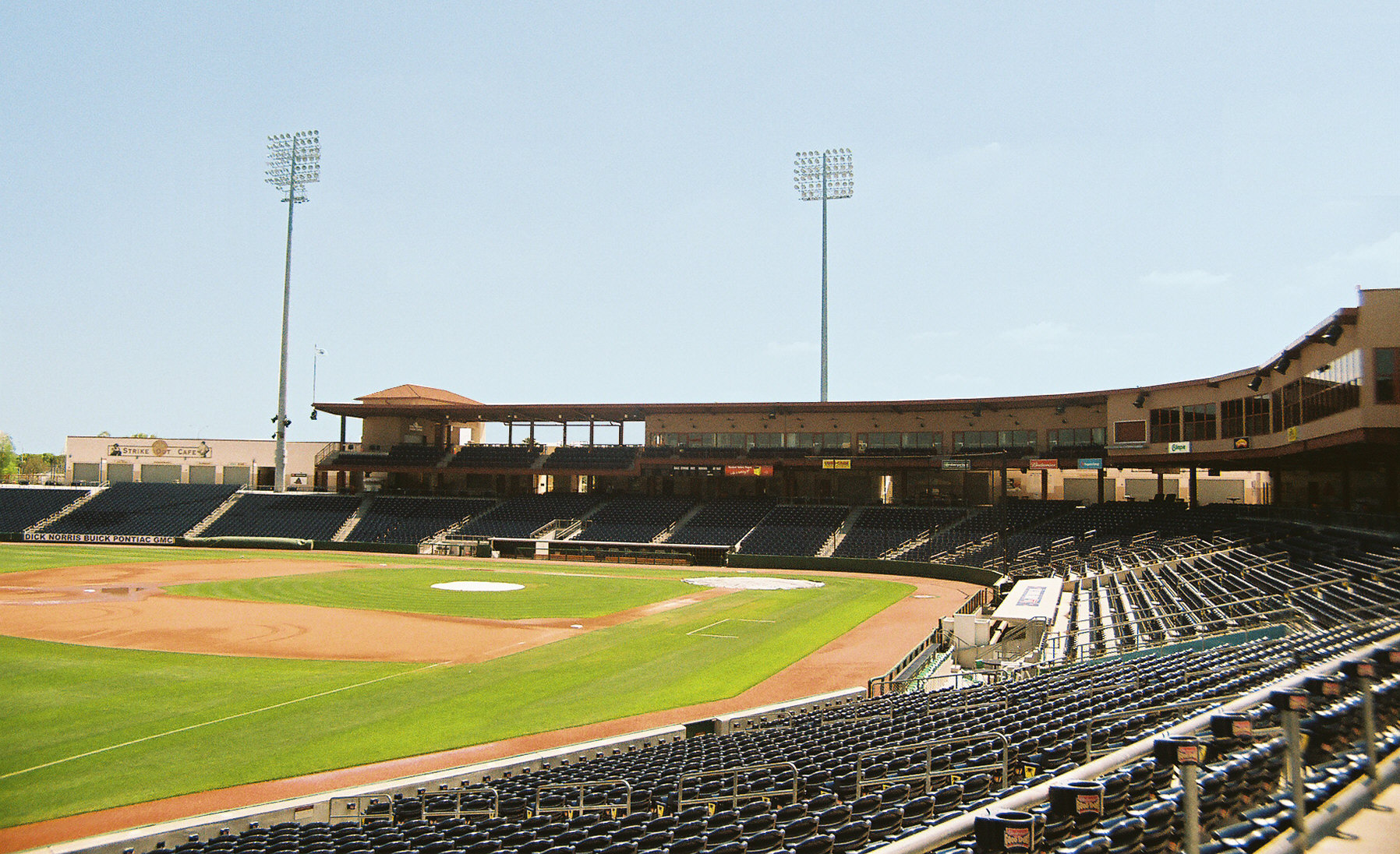
Grandstand, with 2nd-level Luxury Suites

BayCare Ballpark hosted the 44th Florida State League All-Star Game on June 18, 2005. A crowd of 5,547 saw the West defeat the East 6–4. The Sarasota Reds' Chris Dickerson hit a two-run home run, scored two runs, and earned the game's Star of Stars Award. Future major league players who appeared in the game included Dickeron, Reggie Abercrombie, Carlos Villanueva, and Sean Marshall.

Threshers pitcher Julio De La Cruz pitched the first no-hitter at the ballpark on August 18, 2006. De La Cruz beat the Sarasota Reds 5–0 in front of 5,906 fans on "Pitch for Pink Night" in Clearwater. The Threshers wore special pink uniforms to raise money for breast cancer research and awareness. It was the first no-hitter for Clearwater since 1992.

=== College baseball ===
The Big East Conference held its championship tournament at BayCare Ballpark in 2006 and from 2008 to 2013. Notre Dame defeated Louisville 7–0 on May 27, 2006, to win the 2006 championship. Louisville defeated Cincinnati 6–3 to win the 2008 championship on May 24, 2008. In 2009, Louisville again won the tournament. In 2010, St. John's won the title, defeating UConn 3–0 in the championship game. In 2011, 5th-seeded Seton Hall became the lowest seeded team ever to win the Big East Tournament, defeating St. John's 4–2. In 2012, St. John's defeated South Florida 7–3 in the title game to win the tournament. Beginning in 2014, the American Athletic Conference has held its conference baseball tournament at BayCare Ballpark.

== Attendance figures ==
The single-game attendance record for the Threshers was set on July 3, 2019, when 10,055 saw Clearwater lose to the Fort Myers Miracle, 1-0. Between 2007 and 2015, the top 6 of the Threshers top 10 single-game attendance numbers occurred on July 3.

The all time spring training attendance record for BayCare Ballpark was set on March 17, 2019, when 11,340 saw the Yankees defeat the Phillies 7-3.

The spring-training attendance mark for BayCare Ballpark is 143,500, set in 2009.

== See also ==
- List of Major League Baseball spring-training stadiums
- List of Major League Baseball stadiums
