= 2015 Cincinnati Bearcats baseball team =

American college baseball season

2015 Cincinnati Bearcats baseball
- Conference: American Athletic Conference
- Record: 15–41 (6–18 The American)
- Head coach: Ty Neal (2nd season)
- Assistant coaches: Adam Bourassa (2nd season); John Lackaff (1st season)
- Home stadium: Marge Schott Stadium

2015 American Athletic Conference baseball standings
| | Conf. | | | | | | Overall |
| Team | W | | L | | T | PCT | W | | L | | T | PCT |
|---|---|---|---|---|---|---|---|---|---|---|---|---|
| Houston ‍†‍‍^{y} | 16 | – | 8 | – | 0 | .667 | 43 | – | 20 | – | 0 | .683 |
| East Carolina‡^{y} ‍‍‍ | 15 | – | 9 | – | 0 | .625 | 40 | – | 22 | – | 0 | .645 |
| Tulane ‍‍‍^{y} | 13 | – | 11 | – | 0 | .542 | 35 | – | 25 | – | 0 | .583 |
| South Florida^{y} ‍‍‍ | 13 | – | 11 | – | 0 | .542 | 34 | – | 26 | – | 1 | .566 |
| Memphis ‍‍‍ | 12 | – | 12 | – | 0 | .500 | 37 | – | 21 | – | 0 | .638 |
| Connecticut ‍‍‍ | 11 | – | 13 | – | 0 | .458 | 35 | – | 25 | – | 0 | .583 |
| UCF ‍‍‍ | 10 | – | 14 | – | 0 | .417 | 31 | – | 27 | – | 0 | .534 |
| Cincinnati ‍‍‍ | 6 | – | 18 | – | 0 | .250 | 15 | – | 41 | – | 0 | .268 |
† – Conference champion ‡ – Tournament champion y – Invited to the NCAA tournament As of June 30, 2015; Rankings from Collegiate Baseball

The 2015 Cincinnati Bearcats baseball team represented the University of Cincinnati during the 2015 NCAA Division I baseball season. The Bearcats played their home games at Marge Schott Stadium as a member of the American Athletic Conference. They were led by head coach Ty Neal, in his second season at Cincinnati.

== Previous season ==
In 2014, the Bearcats finished the season 10th in the American with a record of 22–31, 6–18 in conference play. They failed to qualify for the 2014 American Athletic Conference baseball tournament or the 2014 NCAA Division I baseball tournament.

== Personnel ==
=== Roster ===
2015 Cincinnati Bearcats roster
| Pitchers: 11 – Andrew Zellner – Sophomore; 16 – Cameron Ross – Freshman; 21 – Jarod Yoakam – Freshman; 22 – A.J. Olasz – Freshman; 23 – Doug Lowe – Freshman; 24 – Mitch Patishall – Junior; 25 – Matt Fowler – Freshman; 27 – Bryan Chenoweth – (redshirt) Junior; 28 – J.T. Perez – Freshman; 32 – Colton Cleary – (redshirt) Sophomore; 33 – Dalton Lehnen – Freshman; 34 – Ryan Atkinson – Senior; 39 – Matt Woloszyk – Freshman; 40 – Nick Voss – Freshman; 43 – Patrick Boyle – Junior; 45 – Tristan Hammans – Freshman; 46 – David Orndorff – Freshman; 47 – Tanner Schimmoeller – Freshman; 49 – Kyle Koppenhoefer – Freshman | Catchers: 10 – Woody Wallace – Junior; 13 – Joey Thomas – Freshman; 35 – Russell Clark – Junior; 44 – Hunter Losekamp – Freshman; Infielders: 3 – Jake Richmond – Sophomore; 5 – Ian Happ – Junior; 6 – Manny Rodriguez – Freshman; 7 – Forrest Perron – Junior; 8 – Devin Wenzel – Junior; 18 – Connor McVey – Sophomore; 29 – R.J. Thompson – Sophomore; 30 – J.J. Carr – Freshman; 49 – T.J. Galenti – Freshman | Outfielders: 14 – Ryan Noda – Freshman; 17 – Treg Haberkorn – Freshman; 20 – Kyle Luensman – Freshman; 31 – Chris Klenk – Freshman; 41 – Connor Van Caugherty – Freshman |

=== Coaching staff ===
| Name | Position | Seasons at Cincinnati | Alma mater |
|---|---|---|---|
| Ty Neal | Head coach | 2 | Miami University (1999) |
| Adam Bourassa | Assistant coach | 2 | Wake Forest University (2003) |
| John Lackaff | Assistant coach | 1 | Miami University (2003) |

== Season ==
=== February ===
The Bearcats opened their season with a four-game tournament in Starkville, Mississippi, against Miami (OH) and Mississippi State. In the first game, the Bearcats defeated Miami (OH) 3–1, but they were swept in the next three games by a nationally ranked Mississippi State team. In their second series of the year, the Bearcats were swept in a three-game road series against Santa Clara. Ian Happ recorded ten hits over the three games.

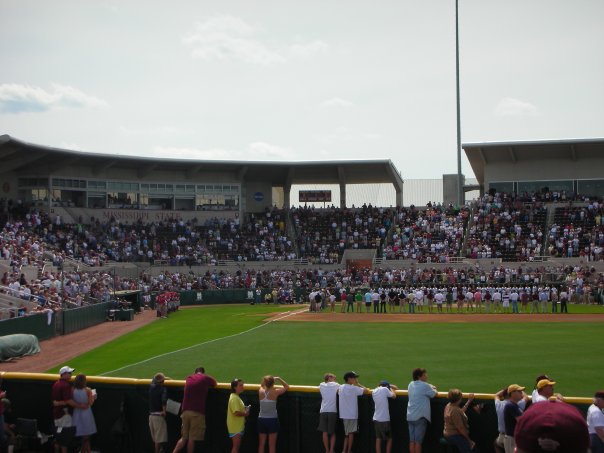
Dudy Noble Field, home field of Mississippi State

Cincinnati was originally scheduled to compete in a tournament at the USA Baseball National Training Complex in Cary, North Carolina, from February 27 – March 1, but inclement weather forced the Bearcats to schedule a three-game series against Iowa in Emerson, Georgia. Over the three-game series, the Bearcats were again swept, marking their third straight weekend series sweep to open the season, and nine straight losses following a neutral site win over Miami (OH). The closest Cincinnati came to a win in the series was in the final game, in which the Bearcats allowed five runs in the thirteenth inning in the loss.

=== March ===
The Bearcats were scheduled to host a midweek game against Xavier on March 4, but the game was cancelled due to weather and not rescheduled. Cincinnati's first weekend series of the month was against Niagara, out of the Metro Atlantic Athletic Conference. Against the Purple Eagles, the Bearcats picked up their first weekend sweep of the year. To complete the sweep, freshman Manny Rodriguez hit a walk off single in the tenth inning of the final game to lead Cincinnati to a 2–1 win.

In their second midweek game of the month, the Bearcats hosted Southeastern Conference foe Kentucky. Kentucky's Ka'ai Tom hit for the cycle for the Wildcats as they picked up a 9–1 win over Cincinnati. Cincinnati then hosted Toledo in a three-game weekend series from March 14–15. The first game of the series was originally scheduled for March 13, but weather pushed the game back to the 14th as part of a doubleheader. The Bearcats went on to win the series, two games to one, dropping the first game of the doubleheader before rebounding to win the final two games.

The Bearcats did not play a midweek game heading into a road series against nationally ranked Nevada over the sixth weekend of the season. Cincinnati endured their fourth weekend sweep of the season as they fell to the Wolf Pack all four games of the series. In the final game of the series, Cincinnati allowed 17 runs, marking the highest total of runs scored by Nevada since 2010.

On March 25, Cincinnati visited Tennessee in Knoxville, Tennessee. The Volunteers had struggled with high expectations early in the season, but had no issues with the visiting Bearcats, leaving home with a 7–0 win. The following weekend, the Bearcats hit the road again to open American Athletic Conference play, visiting South Florida. For the second straight weekend, and the fifth time on the year, the Bearcats were swept over the weekend. After a 4–8 in the first game, the Bulls were subject to a walk-off base hit to lose 3–4 in 11 innings in the second game. To close out the series, the Bearcats were subject to the run rule as they fell to USF 4–15 in seven innings.

== Schedule ==
Legend
| | Cincinnati win |
| | Cincinnati loss |
| | Postponement |
| **Bold** | Cincinnati team member |

2015 Cincinnati Bearcats baseball game log
Regular season
February

| Date | Opponent | Rank | Site/stadium | Score | Win | Loss | Save | Attendance | Overall record | AAC Record |
|---|---|---|---|---|---|---|---|---|---|---|
| February 13 | vs. Miami (OH) | | Dudy Noble Field • Starkville, MS | **W** 3–1 | **Zellner** (1–0) | Banks (0–1) | **Cleary** (1) | 7,981 | 1–0 | – |
| February 13 | at #20 Mississippi State | | Dudy Noble Field • Starkville, MS | **L** 2–6 | P. Brown (1–0) | **Lehnen** (0–1) | | 7,981 | 1–1 | – |
| February 14 | at #20 Mississippi State | | Dudy Noble Field • Starkville, MS | **L** 5–19 | Tatum (1–0) | **Yoakam** (0–1) | | 9,159 | 1–2 | – |
| February 15 | at #20 Mississippi State | | Dudy Noble Field • Starkville, MS | **L** 7–16 | D. Brown (1–0) | **Olasz** (0–1) | Fitts (1) | 6,551 | 1–3 | – |
| February 20 | at Santa Clara | | Stephen Schott Stadium • Santa Clara, CA | **L** 3–11 | Steffens (1–1) | **Atkinston** (0–1) | | 416 | 1–4 | – |
| February 21 | at Santa Clara | | Stephen Schott Stadium • Santa Clara, CA | **L** 8–10 | Inouye (1–0) | **Lehnen** (0–2) | Karalus (1) | 410 | 1–5 | – |
| February 21 | at Santa Clara | | Stephen Schott Stadium • Santa Clara, CA | **L** 4–8 | Hendron (1–0) | **Lowe** (0–1) | Karalus (2) | 410 | 1–6 | – |
| February 27 | vs. Iowa | | Perfect Game Park South • Emerson, GA | **L** 2–6 | Radtke (1–0) | **Atkinson** (0–2) | | 261 | 1–7 | – |
| February 28 | vs. Iowa | | Perfect Game Park South • Emerson, GA | **L** 1–5 | Hickman (1–0) | **Lehnen** (0–3) | Grant (1) | 122 | 1–8 | – |

March

| Date | Opponent | Rank | Site/stadium | Score | Win | Loss | Save | Attendance | Overall record | AAC Record |
|---|---|---|---|---|---|---|---|---|---|---|
| March 1 | vs. Iowa | | Perfect Game Park South • Emerson, GA | **L** 0–5 ^{(13)} | Radtke (2–0) | **Olasz** (0–2) | | 70 | 1–9 | – |
| March 4 | Xavier | | Marge Schott Stadium • Cincinnati, OH | Postponed Rescheduled for May 12 | | | | | | |
| March 7 | Niagara | | Marge Schott Stadium • Cincinnati, OH | **W** 5–1 | **Zellner** (2–0) | Kolodziejski (0–2) | | 302 | 2–9 | – |
| March 8 | Niagara | | Marge Schott Stadium • Cincinnati, OH | **W** 6–4 | **Atkinson** (1–2) | Eckerson (0–1) | | 492 | 3–9 | – |
| March 9 | Niagara | | Marge Schott Stadium • Cincinnati, OH | **W** 2–1 ^{(10)} | **Yoakam** (1–1) | Bucci (0–2) | | 315 | 4–9 | – |
| March 11 | Kentucky | | Marge Schott Stadium • Cincinnati, OH | **L** 1–9 | Dwyer (2–0) | **Patishall** (0–1) | | 777 | 4–10 | – |
| March 13 | Toledo | | Marge Schott Stadium • Cincinnati, OH | Postponed Rescheduled for March 14 | | | | | | |
| March 14 | Toledo | | Marge Schott Stadium • Cincinnati, OH | **L** 5–8 ^{(11)} | Tyson (1–0) | **Yoakam** (1–2) | | 418 | 4–11 | – |
| March 14 | Toledo | | Marge Schott Stadium • Cincinnati, OH | **W** 5–3 | **Lehnen** (1–3) | Calhoun (0–3) | **Atkinson** (1) | 418 | 5–11 | – |
| March 15 | Toledo | | Marge Schott Stadium • Cincinnati, OH | **W** 11–2 | **Cleary** (1–0) | Schillace (2–2) | | 517 | 6–11 | – |
| March 18 | at #29 Nevada | | William Peccole Park • Reno, NV | **L** 3–5 | Wilkins (1–0) | **Perez** (0–1) | Whitt (10) | 726 | 6–12 | – |
| March 19 | at #29 Nevada | | William Peccole Park • Reno, NV | **L** 10–11 | Held (4–0) | **Yoakam** (1–3) | | 813 | 6–13 | – |
| March 20 | at #29 Nevada | | William Peccole Park • Reno, NV | **L** 4–7 | Deitrich (4–1) | **Lehnen** (1–4) | Romero (1) | 930 | 6–14 | – |
| March 21 | at #29 Nevada | | William Peccole Park • Reno, NV | **L** 6–17 | Fain (3–0) | **Olasz** (0–3) | | 1,247 | 6–15 | – |
| March 25 | at Tennessee | | Lindsey Nelson Stadium • Knoxville, TN | **L** 0–7 | Warren (2–0) | **Voss** (0–1) | | 1,644 | 6–16 | – |
| March 27 | at South Florida | | USF Baseball Stadium • Tampa, FL | **L** 4–8 | Herget (5–1) | **Orndorff** (0–1) | | 609 | 6–17 | 0–1 |
| March 28 | at South Florida | | USF Baseball Stadium • Tampa, FL | **L** 3–4 ^{(11)} | Peterson (3–1) | **Yoakam** (1–4) | | 1,044 | 6–18 | 0–2 |
| March 29 | at South Florida | | USF Baseball Stadium • Tampa, FL | **L** 4–15 ^{(7)} | Valdes (3–1) | **Atkinson** (1–3) | Peterson (8) | 690 | 6–19 | 0–3 |
| March 31 | at Wright State | | Nischwitz Stadium • Dayton, OH | **L** 3–5 | Randolph (4–0) | **Patishall** (0–2) | Blair (2) | 346 | 6–20 | – |

April

| Date | Opponent | Rank | Site/stadium | Score | Win | Loss | Save | Attendance | Overall record | AAC Record |
|---|---|---|---|---|---|---|---|---|---|---|
| April 2 | #10 UCF | | Marge Schott Stadium • Cincinnati, OH | **W** 4–1 | **Atkinson** (2–3) | Finfrock (6–1) | **Zellner** (1) | 267 | 7–20 | 1–3 |
| April 3 | #10 UCF | | Marge Schott Stadium • Cincinnati, OH | **W** 5–3 | **Orndorff** (1–1) | Howell (4–3) | **Zellner** (2) | 233 | 8–20 | 2–3 |
| April 4 | #10 UCF | | Marge Schott Stadium • Cincinnati, OH | **L** 1–2 | Rodgers (5–0) | **Lehnen** (1–5) | | 917 | 8–21 | 2–4 |
| April 8 | at Indiana | | Bart Kaufman Field • Bloomington, IN | **W** 5–4 | **Yoakam** (2–4) | Foote (1–1) | **Zellner** (3) | 1,549 | 9–21 | – |
| April 10 | Memphis | | Marge Schott Stadium • Cincinnati, OH | **W** 6–2 | **Atkinson** (3–3) | Wallingford (1–1) | **Yoakam** (1) | 411 | 10–21 | 3–4 |
| April 11 | Memphis | | Marge Schott Stadium • Cincinnati, OH | **L** 3–8 | Toscano (5–1) | **Zellner** (2–1) | | 598 | 10–22 | 3–5 |
| April 12 | Memphis | | Marge Schott Stadium • Cincinnati, OH | **W** 8–7 ^{(12)} | **Schimmoeller** (3–3) | Blackwood (0–1) | | 535 | 11–21 | 4–4 |
| April 14 | Xavier | | Marge Schott Stadium • Cincinnati, OH | **W** 4–0 | **Hammans** (1–0) | Jacknewitz (0–2) | | 1,315 | 12–22 | – |
| April 15 | Wright State | | Marge Schott Stadium • Cincinnati, OH | **L** 9–15 | Trapino (4–0) | **Perez** (0–2) | | 279 | 12–23 | – |
| April 17 | at #28 Houston | | Cougar Field • Houston, TX | Postponed Rescheduled for April 18 | | | | | | |
| April 18 | at #28 Houston | | Cougar Field • Houston, TX | **L** 1–4 | Weigel (4–0) | **Atkinson** (3–4) | | 1,904 | 12–24 | 4–6 |
| April 18 | at #28 Houston | | Cougar Field • Houston, TX | **L** 0–13 | Dowdy (5–1) | **Orndorff** (1–2) | | 1,904 | 12–25 | 4–7 |
| April 19 | at #28 Houston | | Cougar Field • Houston, TX | **L** 2–9 | Romero (4–3) | **Lehnen** (1–6) | | 1,793 | 12–26 | 4–8 |
| April 21 | #3 Louisville | | Marge Schott Stadium • Cincinnati, OH | **L** 2–6 | Leland (3–0) | **Hammans** (1–1) | | 489 | 12–27 | – |
| April 22 | at Xavier | | J. Page Hayden Field • Cincinnati, OH | **W** 8–5 | **Yoakam** (3–4) | Johnson (1–3) | **Zellner** (4) | 378 | 13–27 | – |
| April 24 | Tulane | | Marge Schott Stadium • Cincinnati, OH | **L** 0–4 | Merrill (3–3) | **Atkinson** (3–5) | Gibaut (4) | 522 | 13–28 | 4–9 |
| April 25 | Tulane | | Marge Schott Stadium • Cincinnati, OH | **L** 6–8 | Duester (5–4) | **Zellner** (2–2) | | 296 | 13–29 | 4–10 |
| April 26 | Tulane | | Marge Schott Stadium • Cincinnati, OH | **L** 5–9 | Massey (5–2) | **Lehnen** (1–7) | Gibaut (5) | 631 | 13–30 | 4–11 |

May

| Date | Opponent | Rank | Site/stadium | Score | Win | Loss | Save | Attendance | Overall record | AAC Record |
|---|---|---|---|---|---|---|---|---|---|---|
| May 1 | at Memphis | | FedExPark • Memphis, TN | **W** 11–4 | **Atkinson** (4–5) | Hathcock (2–4) | | 732 | 14–30 | 5–11 |
| May 2 | at Memphis | | FedExPark • Memphis, TN | **W** 5–4 ^{(12)} | **Perez** (1–2) | Caufield (3–1) | **Yoakam** (2) | 1278 | 15–30 | 6–11 |
| May 3 | at Memphis | | FedExPark • Memphis, TN | **L** 3–4 | Blackwood (2–1) | **Perez** (1–3) | | 811 | 15–31 | 6–12 |
| May 6 | Ohio State | | Marge Schott Stadium • Cincinnati, OH | **L** 0–6 | Niemeyer (2–0) | **Schimmoeller** (1–1) | | 1,072 | 15–32 | – |
| May 8 | at Connecticut | | J. O. Christian Field • Storrs, CT | **L** 6–12 | Cross (10–2) | **Yoakam** (3–5) | | 149 | 15–33 | 6–13 |
| May 9 | at Connecticut | | J. O. Christian Field • Storrs, CT | **L** 8–10 | Kay (7–5) | **Zellner** (2–3) | | 229 | 15–34 | 6–14 |
| May 10 | at Connecticut | | J. O. Christian Field • Storrs, CT | **L** 4–9 | Tabakman (3–4) | **Schimmoeller** (1–2) | | 286 | 15–35 | 6–15 |
| May 12 | Xavier | | Marge Schott Stadium • Cincinnati, OH | **L** 1–5 | Jacknewitz (4–5) | **Voss** (0–2) | | 350 | 15–36 | – |
| May 14 | East Carolina | | Marge Schott Stadium • Cincinnati, OH | **L** 3–7 | Love (7–3) | **Atkinson** (4–6) | | 519 | 15–37 | 6–16 |
| May 15 | East Carolina | | Marge Schott Stadium • Cincinnati, OH | **L** 4–6 | Kruczynski (7–3) | **Zellner** (2–4) | Ingle (5) | 677 | 15–38 | 6–17 |
| May 16 | East Carolina | | Marge Schott Stadium • Cincinnati, OH | **L** 7–8 | Durazo (4–0) | **Patishall** (0–3) | Ingle (6) | 1036 | 15–39 | 6–18 |

Postseason
AAC Tournament

| Date | Opponent | Rank | Site/stadium | Score | Win | Loss | Save | Attendance | Overall record | AACT Record |
|---|---|---|---|---|---|---|---|---|---|---|
| May 19 | #23 Houston | | Bright House Field • Clearwater, FL | | | | | | | |
| TBD | TBD | | Bright House Field • Clearwater, FL | | | | | | | |

All rankings from Collegiate Baseball.

== Awards and honors ==
Ian Happ

- Louisville Slugger Pre-season Third team All-American
- Perfect Game USA Pre-season First team All-American
- Pre-season AAC Player of the Year
- Pre-season All-AAC
- Baseball America Pre-season First team All-American
- AAC Player of the Year
- First Team All-Conference Unanimous Selection
