= 2015 South Florida Bulls baseball team =

American college baseball season

2015 South Florida Bulls baseball

Gainesville Regional, 1–2
- Conference: American Athletic Conference
- Record: 34–26–1 (13–11 The American)
- Head coach: Mark Kingston (1st season)
- Assistant coaches: Mike Current (1st season); Billy Mohl (1st season)
- Home stadium: USF Baseball Stadium

2015 American Athletic Conference baseball standings
	Conf.						Overall
Team	W		L		T	PCT	W		L		T	PCT
Houston ‍†‍‍^{y}	16	–	8	–	0	.667	43	–	20	–	0	.683
East Carolina‡^{y} ‍‍‍	15	–	9	–	0	.625	40	–	22	–	0	.645
Tulane ‍‍‍^{y}	13	–	11	–	0	.542	35	–	25	–	0	.583
South Florida^{y} ‍‍‍	13	–	11	–	0	.542	34	–	26	–	1	.566
Memphis ‍‍‍	12	–	12	–	0	.500	37	–	21	–	0	.638
Connecticut ‍‍‍	11	–	13	–	0	.458	35	–	25	–	0	.583
UCF ‍‍‍	10	–	14	–	0	.417	31	–	27	–	0	.534
Cincinnati ‍‍‍	6	–	18	–	0	.250	15	–	41	–	0	.268
† – Conference champion ‡ – Tournament champion y – Invited to the NCAA tournament As of June 30, 2015; Rankings from Collegiate Baseball

The 2015 South Florida baseball team represented the University of South Florida during the 2015 NCAA Division I baseball season. The Bulls played their home games at USF Baseball Stadium as a member of the American Athletic Conference. They were led by head coach Mark Kingston in his first season at South Florida.

== Previous season ==
In 2014, the Bulls finished the season 5th in the American with a record of 27–31, 10–14 in conference play. They qualified for the 2014 American Athletic Conference baseball tournament and were eliminated in pool play. They failed to qualify for the 2014 NCAA Division I baseball tournament.

== Personnel ==
=== Roster ===
2015 South Florida Bulls roster
Pitchers: 10 – Jordan Strittmatter – Senior; 13 – Brandon Lawson – Sophomore; 17 – Mark Savarese – Sophomore; 19 – Cody Hernandez – Junior; 20 – Jimmy Herget – Junior; 22 – Michael Farley – Sophomore; 24 – Michael Clarkson – (redshirt) Junior; 25 – Joe Cavallaro – Freshman; 27 – Diego Rapalino – (redshirt) Junior; 28 – Jonah Owenby – Freshman; 37 – Tommy Peterson – (redshirt) Sophomore; 40 – Josh Walker – Sophomore; 44 – Brandon Murray – Sophomore; 45 – Josh Witherspoon – Freshman; 47 – Casey Mulholland – Senior; 51 – Joe Adel – (redshirt) Junior	Catchers: 12 – Levi Borders – Junior; 34 – Jeff Korte – Freshman; Infielders: 2 – Clay Simmons – Sophomore; 3 – Kyle Teaf – Senior; 4 – Luke Borders – Sophomore; 5 – Buddy Putnam – Senior; 6 – Kevin Merrell – Freshman; 8 – Nik Alfonso – (redshirt) Junior; 9 – Andres Leal – Sophomore; 16 – Zac Gilcrease – Senior; 26 – Paul Russo – Freshman; 33 – Vincent Miniet – Sophomore	Outfielders: 7 – Austin Lueck – Senior; 14 – Vincent Leto – Junior; 15 – Hayden Kelley – Junior; 18 – Luke Maglich – Junior; 29 – Daniel Portales – Sophomore; 42 – Ryan Valdes – Junior

=== Coaching staff ===
Name	Position	Seasons at South Florida	Alma mater
Mark Kingston	Head coach	1	University of North Carolina at Chapel Hill (1995)
Mike Current	Assistant coach	2	Blackburn College (2005)
Billy Mohl	Assistant coach	1	Tulane University (2007)

== Season ==
=== February ===
The Bulls opened their season in Clearwater, Florida, close to their campus in Tampa, for a three-game opening weekend tournament with a pair of nationally-ranked clubs in Cal State Fullerton and Louisville, along with Alabama State. The Bulls went two for three on the weekend, upsetting Cal State Fullerton in the opening game in a pitching duel between Bulls ace Jimmy Herget, who recorded nine strikeouts, and Titans ace Thomas Eshelman, who recorded ten. The Bulls then fell to Louisville, 3–7, before easily defeating Alabama State 12–4 to finish off the weekend 2–1.

The Bulls hosted #5 Florida in a midweek game on February 18, and the Gators defeated the Bulls 13–3 behind six no-hit innings from Brett Morales. In their weekend series from February 20–22, the Bulls took the series against Wagner, winning the first two games handily before settling for an unusual tie in the final game due to a travel curfew for the Seahawks.

In the final week of the month of February, the Bulls played a midweek game against Florida Gulf Coast and fell 2–6, losing their third straight midweek game dating back to 2014. In their weekend series against High Point, the Bulls won two of three games, led by another good start for ace Jimmy Herget.

== Schedule ==
Legend
	South Florida win
	South Florida loss
	Tie
	Postponement
**Bold**	South Florida team member

2015 South Florida Bulls baseball game log
Regular season
February

Date	Opponent	Rank	Site/stadium	Score	Win	Loss	Save	Attendance	Overall record	AAC Record
February 13	vs. #17 Cal State Fullerton		Bright House Field • Clearwater, FL	**W** 2–1	**Cavallaro** (1–0)	Eshelman (0–1)	**Peterson** (1)	N/A	1–0	–
February 14	vs. #12 Louisville		Bright House Field • Clearwater, FL	**L** 3–7	Harrington (1–0)	**Mulholland** (0–1)		N/A	1–1	–
February 15	vs. Alabama State		Bright House Field • Clearwater, FL	**W** 12–4	**Farley** (1–0)	Taylor (0–1)		N/A	2–1	–
February 18	#5 Florida		USF Baseball Stadium • Tampa, FL	**L** 3–13	Morales (1–0)	**Peterson** (0–1)		2,059	2–2	–
February 20	Wagner		USF Baseball Stadium • Tampa, FL	**W** 12–1	**Herget** (1–0)	Morris (0–1)		652	3–2	–
February 21	Wagner		USF Baseball Stadium • Tampa, FL	**W** 9–2	**Mulholland** (1–1)	Adams (0–1)		796	4–2	–
February 22	Wagner		USF Baseball Stadium • Tampa, FL	**T** 4–4 ^{(11)}				637	4–2–1	–
February 24	Florida Gulf Coast		USF Baseball Stadium • Tampa, FL	**L** 2–6	Koerner (2–0)	**Valdes** (0–1)		678	4–3–1	–
February 27	High Point		USF Baseball Stadium • Tampa, FL	**W** 2–1	**Herget** (2–0)	McGillicuddy (0–3)	**Peterson** (2)	661	5–3–1	–
February 28	High Point		USF Baseball Stadium • Tampa, FL	**L** 3–10	Silber (1–0)	**Mulholland** (1–2)		612	5–4–1	–

March

Date	Opponent	Rank	Site/stadium	Score	Win	Loss	Save	Attendance	Overall record	AAC Record
March 1	High Point		USF Baseball Stadium • Tampa, FL	**W** 3–0	**Cavallaro** (2–0)	Hoffman (0–2)	**Peterson** (3)	623	6–4–1	–
March 3	at #22 Florida State		Dick Howser Stadium • Tallahassee, FL	**L** 1–24	Carlton (1–0)	**Lawson** (0–1)		3,944	6–5–1	–
March 4	at #22 Florida State		Dick Howser Stadium • Tallahassee, FL	**L** 3–7	Byrd (2–0)	**Eveld** (0–1)	Folsom (1)	3,900	6–6–1	–
March 6	Seton Hall		USF Baseball Stadium • Tampa, FL	**W** 1–0	**Herget** (3–0)	Prendergast (1–1)	**Peterson** (4)	451	7–6–1	–
March 7	Seton Hall		USF Baseball Stadium • Tampa, FL	**W** 7–3	**Mulholland** (2–2)	McCarthy (0–1)		657	8–6–1	–
March 8	Seton Hall		USF Baseball Stadium • Tampa, FL	**W** 12–6	**Eveld** (1–1)	Cahill (0–2)		701	9–6–1	–
March 11	at Bethune-Cookman		Jackie Robinson Ballpark • Daytona Beach, FL	**W** 1–0	**Valdes** (1–1)	Lindsay (0–1)	**Peterson** (5)	64	10–6–1	–
March 13	Florida A&M		USF Baseball Stadium • Tampa, FL	**W** 10–5	**Herget** (4–0)	Ogilvie (0–3)		657	11–6–1	–
March 14	Florida A&M		USF Baseball Stadium • Tampa, FL	**W** 4–1	**Mulholland** (3–2)	Jarrell (1–2)	**Peterson** (6)	774	12–6–1	–
March 15	Florida A&M		USF Baseball Stadium • Tampa, FL	**W** 5–0	**Cavallaro** (3–0)	Anderson (0–1)		712	13–6–1	–
March 17	Stetson		USF Baseball Stadium • Tampa, FL	**W** 5–2	**Valdes** (2–1)	Whitlock (0–1)	**Peterson** (7)	776	14–6–1	–
March 18	FIU		USF Baseball Stadium • Tampa, FL	**W** 4–3	**Peterson** (1–0)	Dopico (1–2)		481	15–6–1	–
March 20	at #18 Illinois		Illinois Field • Champaign, IL	**L** 1–13	Duchene (3–1)	**Herget** (4–1)		543	15–7–1	–
March 21	at #18 Illinois		Illinois Field • Champaign, IL	**L** 2–5	Johnson (3–1)	**Mulholland** (3–3)	Jay (5)	1,021	15–8–1	–
March 22	at #18 Illinois		Illinois Field • Champaign, IL	**W** 8–5	**Peterson** (2–1)	Jay (4–1)		784	16–8–1	–
March 24	at Florida Gulf Coast		Swanson Stadium • Fort Myers, FL	**W** 8–7	**Farley** (2–0)	Anderson (2–2)		394	17–8–1	–
March 27	Cincinnati		USF Baseball Stadium • Tampa, FL							
March 28	Cincinnati		USF Baseball Stadium • Tampa, FL							
March 29	Cincinnati		USF Baseball Stadium • Tampa, FL							
March 31	at Stetson		Melching Field • DeLand, FL							

April

Date	Opponent	Rank	Site/stadium	Score	Win	Loss	Save	Attendance	Overall record	AAC Record
April 2	at Connecticut		J. O. Christian Field • Storrs, CT							
April 3	at Connecticut		J. O. Christian Field • Storrs, CT							
April 4	at Connecticut		J. O. Christian Field • Storrs, CT							
April 7	at FIU		FIU Baseball Stadium • Miami, FL							
April 10	East Carolina		USF Baseball Stadium • Tampa, FL							
April 11	East Carolina		USF Baseball Stadium • Tampa, FL							
April 12	East Carolina		USF Baseball Stadium • Tampa, FL							
April 14	Stetson		USF Baseball Stadium • Tampa, FL							
April 17	at Memphis		FedExPark • Memphis, TN							
April 18	at Memphis		FedExPark • Memphis, TN							
April 19	at Memphis		FedExPark • Memphis, TN							
April 22	Bethune-Cookman		USF Baseball Stadium • Tampa, FL							
April 24	Houston		USF Baseball Stadium • Tampa, FL							
April 25	Houston		USF Baseball Stadium • Tampa, FL							
April 26	Houston		USF Baseball Stadium • Tampa, FL							

May

Date	Opponent	Rank	Site/stadium	Score	Win	Loss	Save	Attendance	Overall record	AAC Record
May 1	at UCF		Jay Bergman Field • Orlando, FL							
May 2	at UCF		Jay Bergman Field • Orlando, FL							
May 3	at UCF		Jay Bergman Field • Orlando, FL							
May 5	at Florida		Alfred A. McKethan Stadium • Gainesville, FL							
May 8	at Tulane		Greer Field • New Orleans, LA							
May 9	at Tulane		Greer Field • New Orleans, LA							
May 10	at Tulane		Greer Field • New Orleans, LA							
May 12	at Jacksonville		John Sessions Stadium • Jacksonville, FL							
May 14	UCF		USF Baseball Stadium • Tampa, FL							
May 15	UCF		USF Baseball Stadium • Tampa, FL							
May 16	UCF		USF Baseball Stadium • Tampa, FL							

Postseason
AAC Tournament

Date	Opponent	Rank	Site/stadium	Score	Win	Loss	Save	Attendance	Overall record	AACT Record
May 20	TBD		Bright House Field • Clearwater, FL							
May 21	TBD		Bright House Field • Clearwater, FL							

All rankings from Collegiate Baseball.

== Awards and honors ==
Jimmy Herget

- Pre-season AAC Pitcher of the Year
- Pre-season All-AAC

Kyle Teaf

- Pre-season All-AAC
