= 2015 Houston Cougars baseball team =

American college baseball season

2015 Houston Cougars baseball

AAC regular season champions

Houston Regional, 1–2
- Conference: American Athletic Conference

Ranking
- Coaches: No. 23
- Record: 43–20 (16–8 The American)
- Head coach: Todd Whitting (5th season)
- Assistant coaches: Frank Anderson (3rd season); Trip Couch (5th season); Mike Taylor (2nd season)
- Home stadium: Cougar Field

2015 American Athletic Conference baseball standings
	Conf.						Overall
Team	W		L		T	PCT	W		L		T	PCT
Houston ‍†‍‍^{y}	16	–	8	–	0	.667	43	–	20	–	0	.683
East Carolina‡^{y} ‍‍‍	15	–	9	–	0	.625	40	–	22	–	0	.645
Tulane ‍‍‍^{y}	13	–	11	–	0	.542	35	–	25	–	0	.583
South Florida^{y} ‍‍‍	13	–	11	–	0	.542	34	–	26	–	1	.566
Memphis ‍‍‍	12	–	12	–	0	.500	37	–	21	–	0	.638
Connecticut ‍‍‍	11	–	13	–	0	.458	35	–	25	–	0	.583
UCF ‍‍‍	10	–	14	–	0	.417	31	–	27	–	0	.534
Cincinnati ‍‍‍	6	–	18	–	0	.250	15	–	41	–	0	.268
† – Conference champion ‡ – Tournament champion y – Invited to the NCAA tournament As of June 30, 2015; Rankings from Collegiate Baseball

The 2015 Houston Cougars baseball team represented the University of Houston during the 2015 NCAA Division I baseball season. The Cougars played their home games at Cougar Field as a member of the American Athletic Conference. They were led by head coach Todd Whitting, in his fifth season at Houston.

== Previous season ==
In 2014, the Cougars finished the season 3rd in the American Athletic Conference with a record of 48–16, 14–9 in conference play. They went on to win the 2014 American Athletic Conference baseball tournament. In the 2014 NCAA Division I baseball tournament, the Cougars upset LSU to win the Baton Rouge Regional, before falling to Texas in two games in the Austin Super Regional.

== Personnel ==
=== Roster ===
2015 Houston Cougars baseball team
Players
Coaches

#	Pos.	Name	B/T	Height	Weight	Year	Previous school	Home town
37	C	Colin Butkiewicz	R/R	6 ft 2 in (1.88 m)	175 lb (79 kg)	Fr	Greendale HS	Milwaukee, WI
31	C	Jacob Campbell	R/R	5 ft 10 in (1.78 m)	200 lb (91 kg)	Jr	Alvin HS	Alvin, TX
19	RHP	Taylor Cobb	R/R	6 ft 3 in (1.91 m)	220 lb (100 kg)	Sr	Austin HS; Blinn College	Houston, TX
36	INF	Chase Cryer	R/R	5 ft 8 in (1.73 m)	189 lb (86 kg)	Fr	Belton HS	Belton, TX
27	INF	Derek Dickerson	R/R	5 ft 11 in (1.8 m)	269 lb (122 kg)	Fr	Cypress Ranch HS	Cypress, TX
5	INF	Garrett Domingue	L/R	5 ft 11 in (1.8 m)	170 lb (77 kg)	RS Fr	Klein HS	Spring, TX
33	RHP	Kyle Dowdy	R/R	6 ft 2 in (1.88 m)	205 lb (93 kg)	RS Jr	Francis Parker School; Hawaii; Orange Coast College	San Diego, CA
51	RHP	Micah Edwards	R/R	6 ft 2 in (1.88 m)	170 lb (77 kg)	Fr	Kingwood Park HS	Kingwood, TX
47	LHP	Aaron Fletcher	L/L	5 ft 11 in (1.8 m)	240 lb (109 kg)	Fr	Langham Creek HS	Cypress, TX
23	OF	Ashford Fulmer	R/R	6 ft 1 in (1.85 m)	190 lb (86 kg)	Jr	Cypress Ranch HS	Cypress, TX
21	RHP	Aaron Garza	R/R	6 ft 4 in (1.93 m)	200 lb (91 kg)	Sr	Ball HS	Galveston, TX
1	INF	Robert Grilli	L/R	5 ft 7 in (1.7 m)	170 lb (77 kg)	Jr	St. Michael's College School; Salt Lake Community College	Toronto, ON
32	OF	Daniel Halevy	R/R	6 ft 0 in (1.83 m)	187 lb (85 kg)	Fr	St. John's School	Houston, TX
44	INF	Connor Hollis	R/R	5 ft 10 in (1.78 m)	172 lb (78 kg)	So	Lamar High School	Arlington, TX
43	RHP	Braeden Holub	R/R	6 ft 3 in (1.91 m)	292 lb (132 kg)	Fr	Tomball HS	Tomball, TX
25	INF	Chris Iriart	R/R	6 ft 2 in (1.88 m)	230 lb (104 kg)	Jr	Chino Hills HS; Orange Coast College	Chino Hills, CA
24	INF	Corey Julks	R/R	5 ft 10 in (1.78 m)	180 lb (82 kg)	Fr	Clear Brook HS	Friendswood, TX
14	RHP	Marshall Kasowski	L/R	6 ft 3 in (1.91 m)	220 lb (100 kg)	So	Oak Ridge HS	The Woodlands, TX
13	RHP	Andrew Lantrip	R/R	6 ft 2 in (1.88 m)	175 lb (79 kg)	So	Livingston HS	Livingston, TX
26	RHP	Jake Lemoine	R/R	6 ft 5 in (1.96 m)	220 lb (100 kg)	Jr	Bridge City HS	Bridge City, TX
29	LHP	Matt Locus	L/L	5 ft 11 in (1.8 m)	180 lb (82 kg)	Sr	Katy HS	Katy, TX
38	RHP	David Longville	R/R	6 ft 3 in (1.91 m)	210 lb (95 kg)	Sr	Capistrano Valley HS; Hawaii; Orange Coast College	Mission Viejo, CA
40	OF	Gino Marucci	R/R	5 ft 11 in (1.8 m)	175 lb (79 kg)	RS Fr	University HS	Baton Rouge, LA
28	RHP	Bubba Maxwell	R/R	5 ft 11 in (1.8 m)	185 lb (84 kg)	Jr	Vidor HS; Lamar; Panola College	Vidor, TX
20	INF	Justin Montemayor	L/R	6 ft 3 in (1.91 m)	225 lb (102 kg)	Jr	Anderson HS	Austin, TX
17	RHP	Austin Moore	R/R	6 ft 3 in (1.91 m)	215 lb (98 kg)	Jr	Mountain View HS	Tucson, AZ
30	C	George Pappas	R/R	6 ft 1 in (1.85 m)	205 lb (93 kg)	Fr	Memorial HS	Houston, TX
2	OF	Michael Pyeatt	L/R	5 ft 9 in (1.75 m)	190 lb (86 kg)	Sr	Brazoswood HS	Lake Jackson, TX
15	RHP	Chris Reed	R/R	6 ft 2 in (1.88 m)	175 lb (79 kg)	Fr	Aledo HS	Aledo, TX
7	C	Ian Rice	R/R	6 ft 0 in (1.83 m)	190 lb (86 kg)	Jr	Madison Academy; Chipola College	Huntsville, AL
12	RHP	Jared Robinson	R/R	6 ft 0 in (1.83 m)	180 lb (82 kg)	Sr	Monterey HS; Midland College	Lubbock, TX
41	LHP	Seth Romero	L/L	6 ft 1 in (1.85 m)	242 lb (110 kg)	Fr	Columbia HS	West Columbia, TX
35	INF	Jordan Stading	L/R	6 ft 3 in (1.91 m)	205 lb (93 kg)	So	Second Baptist School	Katy, TX
34	OF	Kyle Survance	L/R	6 ft 1 in (1.85 m)	190 lb (86 kg)	Jr	Jersey Village HS	Jersey Village, TX
4	OF	Zac Taylor	R/R	6 ft 0 in (1.83 m)	174 lb (79 kg)	Fr	Downers Grove South HS	Downers Grove, IL
8	INF	Josh Vidales	S/R	5 ft 8 in (1.73 m)	160 lb (73 kg)	Jr	La Porte HS	La Porte, TX
18	RHP	Patrick Weigel	R/R	6 ft 5 in (1.96 m)	222 lb (101 kg)	Jr	St. Bonaventure HS; Pacific; Oxnard College	Ventura, CA
42	INF	Michael Wisz	R/R	6 ft 1 in (1.85 m)	220 lb (100 kg)	Fr	Lemont HS	Lemont, IL
10	INF	Connor Wong	R/R	5 ft 10 in (1.78 m)	170 lb (77 kg)	Fr	Pearland HS	Pearland, TX

Head coach

Todd Whitting

Assistant coach(es)

Frank Anderson
Trip Couch
Mike Taylor

Legend

- (C) Team captain
- (S) Suspended
- (I) Ineligible
- Injured
- Current redshirt

Roster
Last update: November 4, 2014

=== Coaching staff ===
Name	Position	Seasons at Houston	Alma mater
Todd Whitting	Head coach	5	University of Houston (1995)
Trip Couch	Assistant coach	5	University of Louisiana at Lafayette (1991)
Frank Anderson	Assistant coach	3	Emporia State University (1983)
Mike Taylor	Assistant coach	2	Prairie View A&M University (1997)

== Season ==
=== February ===
The Cougars opened their season with a three-game series against Minnesota. The Cougars, ranked 8th in the nation, swept the Golden Gophers over the three game series. Houston outscored Minnesota 14–1 over the first two games of the series, and won the third game on a walk-off to complete the series sweep. The Cougars also had an 11–5 win over Texas Southern the following Wednesday (after it was pushed back from Tuesday).

On the second weekend of the season, the Cougars hosted 30th ranked Alabama. After winning the first two games of the series, the Crimson Tide salvaged a win in game three, thanks to 14 hits. On February 25, the Cougars took their second straight loss, this time on the road to Texas State.

The Cougars closed out the month with a four-game series against Columbia. Houston was subject to a major upset in the second and fourth games of the series and ended up splitting the four game set with Columbia, the two time defending Ivy League champions. The losses, coupled with the loss to Texas State earlier in the week, caused the Cougars to drop to #12 in two of the major polls.

== Schedule ==
Legend
	Houston win
	Houston loss
	Postponement
**Bold**	Houston team member

2015 Houston Cougars baseball game log
Regular season
February

Date	Opponent	Rank	Site/stadium	Score	Win	Loss	Save	Attendance	Overall record	AAC Record
February 13	Minnesota	#8	Cougar Field • Houston, TX	**W** 9–1	**Lantrip** (1–0)	Meyer (0–1)		2,132	1–0	–
February 14	Minnesota	#8	Cougar Field • Houston, TX	**W** 5–0	**Lemoine** (1–0)	Sawyer (0–1)	**Romero** (1)	2,003	2–0	–
February 15	Minnesota	#8	Cougar Field • Houston, TX	**W** 5–4	**Maxwell** (1–0)	Thonvold (0–1)		1,797	3–0	–
February 18	Texas Southern	#6	Cougar Field • Houston, TX	**W** 11–5	**Longville** (1–0)	Konarik (1–1)	**Cobb** (1)	1,442	4–0	–
February 20	#30 Alabama	#6	Cougar Field • Houston, TX	**W** 3–1	**Lantrip** (2–0)	Guilbeau (1–1)	**Romero** (2)	1,989	5–0	–
February 21	#30 Alabama	#6	Cougar Field • Houston, TX	**W** 14–9	**Maxwell** (2–0)	Burrows (0–1)		2,463	6–0	–
February 22	#30 Alabama	#6	Cougar Field • Houston, TX	**L** 3–8	Bramblett (2–0)	**Garza** (0–1)		1,883	6–1	–
February 25	at Texas State	#6	Bobcat Ballpark • San Marcos, TX	**L** 6–7	Whitter (1–0)	**Longville** (1–1)		1,316	6–2	–
February 27	Columbia	#6	Cougar Field • Houston, TX	**W** 3–0	**Lantrip** (3–0)	Thanopoulos (0–1)	**Romero** (3)	1,279	7–2	–
February 28	Columbia	#6	Cougar Field • Houston, TX	**L** 4–5 ^{(13)}	Barr (1–0)	**Robinson** (0–1)	Gannaway (1)	1,772	7–3	–
February 28	Columbia	#6	Cougar Field • Houston, TX	**W** 8–7	**Weigel** (1–0)	Ratner (0–1)		1,772	8–3	–

March

Date	Opponent	Rank	Site/stadium	Score	Win	Loss	Save	Attendance	Overall record	AAC Record
March 1	Columbia	#6	Cougar Field • Houston, TX	**L** 7–12	Wiest (1–0)	**Romero** (0–1)	Marks (1)	1,216	8–4	–
March 3	Houston Baptist	#12	Cougar Field • Houston, TX	**L** 1–2	Jones (1–1)	**Longville** (1–2)	Garza (1)	1,231	8–5	–
March 6	vs. #3 LSU	#12	Minute Maid Park • Houston, TX	**L** 2–4	Poche' (4–0)	**Lantrip** (3–1)	Stallings (6)	10,651	8–6	–
March 7	vs. #11 Texas A&M	#12	Minute Maid Park • Houston, TX	**L** 0–6	Long (3–0)	**Lemoine** (1–1)		16,276	8–7	–
March 8	vs. Hawaii	#12	Minute Maid Park • Houston, TX	**W** 8–6	**Romero** (1–1)	Torres-Costa (0–3)		10,866	9–7	–
March 10	at Sam Houston State		Don Sanders Stadium • Huntsville, TX	**W** 17–7	**Dowdy** (1–0)	Bisacca (1–1)		803	10–7	–
March 13	Buffalo		Cougar Field • Houston, TX	**W** 9–1	**Lantrip** (4–1)	Hartz (0–3)		1,355	11–7	–
March 14	Buffalo		Cougar Field • Houston, TX	**W** 9–3	**Weigel** (2–0)	Magovney (1–3)		1,462	12–7	–
March 15	Buffalo		Cougar Field • Houston, TX	**W** 5–0	**Cobb** (1–0)	McGee (1–1)		1,308	13–7	–
March 17	#15 Rice		Cougar Field • Houston, TX	**W** 8–3	**Romero** (2–1)	Stephens (1–1)	**Garza** (1)	2,789	14–7	–
March 20	at New Mexico		Lobo Field • Albuquerque, NM	**W** 6–5	**Lantrip** (5–1)	Boardman (4–1)	**Garza** (2)	769	15–7	–
March 21	at New Mexico		Lobo Field • Albuquerque, NM	**W** 6–5	**Dowdy** (2–0)	Stevens (1–1)	**Garza** (3)	982	16–7	–
March 22	at New Mexico		Lobo Field • Albuquerque, NM	**W** 8–7	**Romero** (3–1)	Estrella (0–1)		463	17–7	–
March 24	Lamar	#16	Cougar Field • Houston, TX	**W** 6–5 ^{(10)}	**Moore** (1–0)	Oquendo (0–1)		1,502	18–7	–
March 27	at #8 UCF	#16	Jay Bergman Field • Orlando, FL	**L** 2–9	Finfrock (6–0)	**Lantrip** (5–1)		1,397	18–8	0–1
March 28	at #8 UCF	#16	Jay Bergman Field • Orlando, FL	**W** 7–5	**Dowdy** (3–0)	Howell (4–2)	**Romero** (4)	1,555	19–8	1–1
March 29	at #8 UCF	#16	Jay Bergman Field • Orlando, FL	**L** 3–4	Rodgers (4–0)	**Romero** (3–2)		1,281	19–9	1–2
March 31	at Baylor	#14	Baylor Ballpark • Waco, TX	**W** 11–0	**Longville** (2–2)	Kay (3–2)		2,104	20–9	–

April

Date	Opponent	Rank	Site/stadium	Score	Win	Loss	Save	Attendance	Overall record	AAC Record
April 2	at Memphis	#14	FedExPark • Memphis, TN	**W** 3–2	**Lantrip** (6–2)	Wallingford (3–3)		712	21–9	2–2
April 3	at Memphis	#14	FedExPark • Memphis, TN	**L** 6–14	Toscano (3–1)	**Dowdy** (3–1)		912	21–10	2–3
April 4	at Memphis	#14	FedExPark • Memphis, TN	**L** 2–6	Alexander (4–0)	**Romero** (3–2)	Blackwood (10)	829	21–11	2–4
April 7	at Louisiana–Lafayette	#25	M. L. Tigue Moore Field • Lafayette, LA	**L** 5–6	Marks (2–0)	**Garza** (0–2)		3,885	21–12	–
April 10	Tulane	#25	Cougar Field • Houston, TX							
April 11	Tulane	#25	Cougar Field • Houston, TX							
April 12	Tulane	#25	Cougar Field • Houston, TX							
April 14	at Rice		Reckling Park • Houston, TX							
April 17	Cincinnati		Cougar Field • Houston, TX							
April 18	Cincinnati		Cougar Field • Houston, TX							
April 19	Cincinnati		Cougar Field • Houston, TX							
April 21	at McNeese State		Cowboy Diamond • Lake Charles, LA							
April 24	at South Florida		USF Baseball Stadium • Tampa, FL							
April 25	at South Florida		USF Baseball Stadium • Tampa, FL							
April 26	at South Florida		USF Baseball Stadium • Tampa, FL							
April 28	Sam Houston State		Cougar Field • Houston, TX							

May

Date	Opponent	Rank	Site/stadium	Score	Win	Loss	Save	Attendance	Overall record	AAC Record
May 1	at Tulane		Greer Field • New Orleans, LA							
May 2	at Tulane		Greer Field • New Orleans, LA							
May 3	at Tulane		Greer Field • New Orleans, LA							
May 5	McNeese State		Cougar Field • Houston, TX							
May 8	East Carolina		Cougar Field • Houston, TX							
May 9	East Carolina		Cougar Field • Houston, TX							
May 10	East Carolina		Cougar Field • Houston, TX							
May 12	vs. Rice		Constellation Field • Sugar Land, TX							
May 14	Connecticut		Cougar Field • Houston, TX							
May 15	Connecticut		Cougar Field • Houston, TX							
May 16	Connecticut		Cougar Field • Houston, TX							

Postseason
AAC Tournament

Date	Opponent	Rank	Site/stadium	Score	Win	Loss	Save	Attendance	Overall record	AACT Record
May 19			Bright House Field • Clearwater, FL							
May 19			Bright House Field • Clearwater, FL							

All rankings from Collegiate Baseball.

== Rankings ==
Ranking movements Legend: ██ Increase in ranking ██ Decrease in ranking — = Not ranked RV = Received votes
	Week																		
Poll	Pre	1	2	3	4	5	6	7	8	9	10	11	12	13	14	15	16	17	Final
Coaches'	11	11*	11	13	RV	25	19	20	22	—	25	22	21	21	18	15	23		
Baseball America	3	3	3	8	24	22	17	20	—	—	—	—	25	19	14	13			
Collegiate Baseball^	8	6	6	12	—	—	16	14	25	28	28	27	28	26	23	19	—	—	—
NCBWA†	7	6	6	12	21	21	19	20	22	25	22	20	21	21	18	16	23	23	

^ Collegiate Baseball ranked 40 teams in their preseason poll, but only ranked 30 teams weekly during the season.
† NCBWA ranks 30 teams in their preseason poll, but only ranks 25 teams weekly during the season.
* A new poll was not released for this week, so for comparison purposes, the previous week's ranking is inserted in this week's slot.

== Awards and honors ==
Jake Lemoine

- Louisville Slugger Pre-season Third team All-American
- Perfect Game USA Pre-season Second team All-American
- Pre-season All-AAC
- Baseball America Pre-season Second team All-American

Aaron Garza

- Pre-season All-AAC

Andrew Lantrip

- Pre-season All-AAC

Jared Robinson

- Pre-season All-AAC

Connor Hollis

- Pre-season All-AAC

Kyle Survance

- Pre-season All-AAC
