= 2015 Memphis Tigers baseball team =

College baseball team

2015 Memphis Tigers baseball
- Conference: American Athletic Conference
- Record: 21–8 (4–2 The American)
- Head coach: Daron Schoenrock (10th season)
- Assistant coaches: Russ McNickle (2nd season); Clay Greene (3rd season); Lee Parks (1st season)
- Home stadium: FedExPark

2015 American Athletic Conference baseball standings
	Conf.						Overall
Team	W		L		T	PCT	W		L		T	PCT
Houston ‍†‍‍^{y}	16	–	8	–	0	.667	43	–	20	–	0	.683
East Carolina‡^{y} ‍‍‍	15	–	9	–	0	.625	40	–	22	–	0	.645
Tulane ‍‍‍^{y}	13	–	11	–	0	.542	35	–	25	–	0	.583
South Florida^{y} ‍‍‍	13	–	11	–	0	.542	34	–	26	–	1	.566
Memphis ‍‍‍	12	–	12	–	0	.500	37	–	21	–	0	.638
Connecticut ‍‍‍	11	–	13	–	0	.458	35	–	25	–	0	.583
UCF ‍‍‍	10	–	14	–	0	.417	31	–	27	–	0	.534
Cincinnati ‍‍‍	6	–	18	–	0	.250	15	–	41	–	0	.268
† – Conference champion ‡ – Tournament champion y – Invited to the NCAA tournament As of June 30, 2015; Rankings from Collegiate Baseball

The 2015 Memphis Tigers baseball team represented the University of Memphis during the 2015 NCAA Division I baseball season. The Tigers played their home games at FedExPark as a member of the American Athletic Conference. They were led by head coach Daron Schoenrock, in his tenth season at Memphis.

== Previous season ==
In 2014, the Tigers finished the season 8th in the American Athletic Conference with a record of 30–29, 8–16 in conference play. They qualified for the 2014 American Athletic Conference baseball tournament, but failed to qualify for the 2014 NCAA Division I baseball tournament.

== Personnel ==
=== Roster ===
2015 Memphis Tigers roster
Pitchers: 5 - Connor Alexander - Freshman; 11 - Colin Lee - Junior; 14 - Trevor Sutton - Sophomore; 15 - Craig Caufield - (redshirt) Junior; 16 - Alex Gunn - (redshirt) Senior; 17 - Ryan Garner - Sophomore; 18 - Blake Myers - (redshirt) Senior; 19 - Caleb Wallingford - Senior; 23 - Bryan Cruse - Freshman; 27 - Matt Ferguson - Junior; 28 - Dylan Toscano - Senior; 29 - Nolan Blackwood - Sophomore; 30 - Trey McNickle - (redshirt) Junior; 33 - Colton Hathcock - Freshman; 35 - Kellan Hibbard - Junior; 41 - K.C. Abney - (redshirt) Junior; 42 - Drew Crosby - Freshman; 44 - Blake Drabik - Sophomore	Catchers: 4 - Nate Rupiper - Senior; 22 - Corey Chafin - Junior; 26 - Carter White - Senior; 36 - Damo DeMatteo - (redshirt) Junior; Infielders: 1 - Jake Overbay - (redshirt) Junior; 2 - Jacob Elliot - Freshman; 6 - Brandon Montgomery - Freshman; 8 - Tucker Tubbs - Senior; 12 - Zach Schritenthal - Sophomore; 21 - Cody Duncan - Freshman	Outfielders: 7 - Tyler Dixon - (redshirt) Junior; 9 - Jake Little - Junior; 10 - Darien Tubbs - Sophomore; 13 - Chris Carrier - Sophomore; 34 - Kane Barrow - (redshirt) Senior; 37 - Kramer Hollenbach - Junior

=== Coaching staff ===
Name	Position	Seasons at Memphis	Alma mater
Daron Schoenrock	Head coach	10	Tennessee Technological University (1984)
Russ McNickle	Associate head coach	1	University of South Alabama (1988)
Clay Greene	Assistant coach	3	University of Tennessee (2001)
Lee Parks	Assistant coach	1	Mississippi State University (2001)

== Season ==
=== February ===
The Tigers opened their season on February 13 against Oral Roberts on the road in Tulsa, Oklahoma. Over the three game series, the Tigers went 1–2, losing the first two games before rebounding to win the third game of their season, 6–1. A series of weather-related cancellations changed Memphis' schedule over the next week. A tournament in Conway, Arkansas, with Eastern Illinois and host Central Arkansas was shortened, and the Tigers only played one game, a 5–2 win over Central Arkansas. The Tigers' home opener against Mississippi Valley State was then pushed back until the end of April.

To end the month of February (and open March), the Tigers hosted Saint Louis, the three time defending Atlantic 10 regular season champions. The series opened with a doubleheader, in which Memphis won the first game in ten innings after a walk-off home run by Tucker Tubbs, while Saint Louis won the second game. In the third and final game of the series, Memphis won 5–2 in a game that was shortened to seven innings due to rain.

== Schedule ==
Legend
	Memphis win
	Memphis loss
	Postponement
**Bold**	Memphis team member

2015 Memphis Tigers baseball game log
Regular season
February

Date	Opponent	Rank	Site/stadium	Score	Win	Loss	Save	Attendance	Overall record	AAC record
February 13	at Oral Roberts		J. L. Johnson Stadium • Tulsa, OK	**L** 1–3	Garza (1–0)	**Hathcock** (0–1)	Stout (1)	506	0–1	–
February 14	at Oral Roberts		J. L. Johnson Stadium • Tulsa, OK	**L** 3–6	Giller (1–0)	**Lee** (0–1)	Stout (2)	534	0–2	–
February 14	at Oral Roberts		J. L. Johnson Stadium • Tulsa, OK	**W** 6–1	**Toscano** (1–0)	Altamiran (0–1)	**Blackwood** (1)	534	1–2	–
February 20	vs. Eastern Illinois		Bear Stadium • Conway, AR	Cancelled						
February 22	at Central Arkansas		Bear Stadium • Conway, AR	**W** 5–2	**Wallingford** (1–0)	Gilmore (1–1)	**Blackwood** (2)	292	2–2	–
February 22	vs. Eastern Illinois		Bear Stadium • Conway, AR	Cancelled						
February 25	Mississippi Valley State		FedExPark • Memphis, TN	Postponed Rescheduled for April 29						
February 28	Saint Louis		FedExPark • Memphis, TN	**W** 4–3 ^{(10)}	**Caufield** (1–0)	Shimanovsky (0–1)		552	3–2	–
February 28	Saint Louis		FedExPark • Memphis, TN	**L** 2–3	Smith (2–0)	**Wallingford** (1–1)	Girrens (1)	552	3–3	–

March

Date	Opponent	Rank	Site/stadium	Score	Win	Loss	Save	Attendance	Overall record	AAC record
March 1	Saint Louis		FedExPark • Memphis, TN	**W** 5–2 ^{(7)}	**Alexander** (1–0)	Lehmann (0–1)	**Blackwood** (3)	127	4–3	–
March 4	at Belmont		E. S. Rose Park • Nashville, TN	Postponed Rescheduled for April 6						
March 8	Samford		FedExPark • Memphis, TN	Cancelled						
March 8	Samford		FedExPark • Memphis, TN	Cancelled						
March 9	Samford		FedExPark • Memphis, TN	**L** 4–8	Ledford (2–2)	**Toscano** (1–1)	Donham (1)	116	4–4	–
March 10	Middle Tennessee State		FedExPark • Memphis, TN	**W** 3–1	**Alexander** (2–0)	Slatton (1–3)	**Blackwood** (4)	482	5–4	–
March 11	Middle Tennessee State		FedExPark • Memphis, TN	**W** 11–0	**Gunn** (1–0)	Troutt (0–1)		262	6–4	–
March 13	Eastern Illinois		FedExPark • Memphis, TN	Postponed Rescheduled for March 14						
March 14	Eastern Illinois		FedExPark • Memphis, TN	**W** 6–1	**Wallingford** (2–1)	Wivinis (0–3)		372	7–4	–
March 15	Eastern Illinois		FedExPark • Memphis, TN	**W** 11–1	**Toscano** (2–1)	Stenger (0–4)		674	8–4	–
March 15	Eastern Illinois		FedExPark • Memphis, TN	**W** 5–2	**Caufield** (2–0)	Slazinik (0–2)	**Blackwood** (5)	674	9–4	–
March 17	Arkansas State		FedExPark • Memphis, TN	**W** 5–2	**Gunn** (2–0)	Hawkins (1–4)	**Blackwood** (6)	957	10–4	–
March 20	Alcorn State		FedExPark • Memphis, TN	**W** 6–1	**Wallingford** (3–1)	Laird (1–4)		435	11–4	–
March 21	Alcorn State		FedExPark • Memphis, TN	**W** 17–7	**Ferguson** (1–0)	Thompson (0–2)		407	12–4	–
March 21	Alcorn State		FedExPark • Memphis, TN	**W** 14–3	**Toscano** (3–1)	Vasquez (0–1)		407	13–4	–
March 22	Alcorn State		FedExPark • Memphis, TN	**W** 3–1	**Alexander** (3–0)	Brooks (0–3)	**Blackwood** (7)	326	14–4	–
March 24	at Arkansas		Dickey-Stephens Park • North Little Rock, AR	**W** 5–4	**Caufield** (3–0)	Phillips (0–2)		9,145	15–4	–
March 25	Arkansas		AutoZone Park • Memphis, TN	**L** 3–7	Teague (1–1)	**Garner** (0–1)		3,673	15–5	–
March 27	at East Carolina		Clark–LeClair Stadium • Greenville, NC	**L** 1–4	Kruczynski (5–1)	**Wallingford** (3–2)		2,315	15–6	0–1
March 28	at East Carolina		Clark–LeClair Stadium • Greenville, NC	**W** 3–2	**Myers** (1–0)	Boyd (2–7)	**Blackwood** (8)	2,315	16–6	1–1
March 29	at East Carolina		Clark–LeClair Stadium • Greenville, NC	**W** 4–2	**Myers** (2–0)	Lucroy (2–1)	**Blackwood** (9)	2,051	17–6	2–1
March 31	Ole Miss		AutoZone Park • Memphis, TN	**L** 5–7	Denny (1–0)	**Hathcock** (0–1)	Short (4)	2,962	17–7	–

April

Date	Opponent	Rank	Site/stadium	Score	Win	Loss	Save	Attendance	Overall record	AAC record
April 2	#14 Houston		FedExPark • Memphis, TN	**L** 2–3	Lantrip (6–2)	**Wallingford** (3–3)		712	17–8	2–2
April 3	#14 Houston		FedExPark • Memphis, TN	**W** 14–6	**Toscano** (3–1)	Dowdy (3–1)		912	18–8	3–2
April 4	#14 Houston		FedExPark • Memphis, TN	**W** 6–2	**Alexander** (4–0)	Romero (3–3)	**Blackwood** (10)	829	19–8	4–2
April 6	at Belmont		E. S. Rose Park • Nashville, TN	**W** 11–8	**Drabik** (1–0)	McGrath (3–2)	**Blackwood** (11)	146	20–8	–
April 7	Mississippi State		AutoZone Park • Memphis, TN	**W** 7–1	**Gunn** (3–0)	Sexton (3–3)		3,423	21–8	–
April 10	at Cincinnati		Marge Schott Stadium • Cincinnati, OH							
April 11	at Cincinnati		Marge Schott Stadium • Cincinnati, OH							
April 12	at Cincinnati		Marge Schott Stadium • Cincinnati, OH							
April 14	at Austin Peay		Raymond C. Hand Park • Clarksville, TN							
April 17	South Florida		FedExPark • Memphis, TN							
April 18	South Florida		FedExPark • Memphis, TN							
April 19	South Florida		FedExPark • Memphis, TN							
April 21	Belmont		FedExPark • Memphis, TN							
April 22	at Ole Miss		Swayze Field • Oxford, MS							
April 24	at Connecticut		J. O. Christian Field • Storrs, CT							
April 25	at Connecticut		J. O. Christian Field • Storrs, CT							
April 26	at Connecticut		J. O. Christian Field • Storrs, CT							
April 28	at Arkansas State		Tomlinson Stadium • Jonesboro, AR							
April 29	Mississippi Valley State		FedExPark • Memphis, TN							

May

Date	Opponent	Rank	Site/stadium	Score	Win	Loss	Save	Attendance	Overall record	AAC record
May 1	Cincinnati		FedExPark • Memphis, TN							
May 2	Cincinnati		FedExPark • Memphis, TN							
May 3	Cincinnati		FedExPark • Memphis, TN							
May 8	at UCF		Jay Bergman Field • Orlando, FL							
May 9	at UCF		Jay Bergman Field • Orlando, FL							
May 10	at UCF		Jay Bergman Field • Orlando, FL							
May 12	vs. Tennessee–Martin		USA Stadium • Millington, TN							
May 14	Tulane		FedExPark • Memphis, TN							
May 15	Tulane		FedExPark • Memphis, TN							
May 16	Tulane		FedExPark • Memphis, TN							

Postseason
AAC Tournament

Date	Opponent	Rank	Site/stadium	Score	Win	Loss	Save	Attendance	Overall record	AACT record
May 20	TBD		Bright House Field • Clearwater, FL							
May 21	TBD		Bright House Field • Clearwater, FL							

All rankings from Collegiate Baseball.
