= 2015 East Carolina Pirates baseball team =

2015 East Carolina Pirates baseball

AAC tournament champions

Coral Gables Regional, 0–2
- Conference: American Athletic Conference
- Record: 40–22 (15–9 The American)
- Head coach: Cliff Godwin (1st season)
- Assistant coach: Jeff Palumbo (1st season)
- Pitching coach: Dan Roszel (5th season)
- Home stadium: Clark–LeClair Stadium

2015 American Athletic Conference baseball standings
	Conf.						Overall
Team	W		L		T	PCT	W		L		T	PCT
Houston ‍†‍‍^{y}	16	–	8	–	0	.667	43	–	20	–	0	.683
East Carolina‡^{y} ‍‍‍	15	–	9	–	0	.625	40	–	22	–	0	.645
Tulane ‍‍‍^{y}	13	–	11	–	0	.542	35	–	25	–	0	.583
South Florida^{y} ‍‍‍	13	–	11	–	0	.542	34	–	26	–	1	.566
Memphis ‍‍‍	12	–	12	–	0	.500	37	–	21	–	0	.638
Connecticut ‍‍‍	11	–	13	–	0	.458	35	–	25	–	0	.583
UCF ‍‍‍	10	–	14	–	0	.417	31	–	27	–	0	.534
Cincinnati ‍‍‍	6	–	18	–	0	.250	15	–	41	–	0	.268
† – Conference champion ‡ – Tournament champion y – Invited to the NCAA tournament As of June 30, 2015; Rankings from Collegiate Baseball

The 2015 East Carolina Pirates baseball team represented East Carolina University during the 2015 NCAA Division I baseball season. The Pirates played their home games at Clark–LeClair Stadium as a member of the American Athletic Conference. They were led by head coach Cliff Godwin, in his first season at East Carolina.

== Previous season ==
In 2014, the Pirates finished the season 7th in Conference USA with a record of 33–26, 16–14 in conference play. They qualified for the 2014 Conference USA baseball tournament, losing in the second round, but failed to qualify for the 2014 NCAA Division I baseball tournament.

== Personnel ==
=== Roster ===
2015 East Carolina Pirates roster
Pitchers: 12 - David Kirkpatrick - Sophomore; 17 - Brandon Taylor - Senior; 18 - T.J. McDonald - (redshirt) Freshman; 21 - David Lucroy - (redshirt) Junior; 27 - Ross Gardner - Freshman; 31 - Nick Durazo - Junior; 32 - Reid Love - Senior; 33 - Jacob Wolfe - Sophomore; 34 - Mason Keen - Freshman; 35 - Evan Kruczynski - Sophomore; 36 - Joe Ingle - Freshman; 37 - Luke Bolka - Sophomore; 42 - Brandon Saunders - (redshirt) Sophomore; 43 - Jimmy Boyd - Junior; 44 - Evan Voliva - Freshman	Catchers: 10 - Ryan Clinch - Freshman; 19 - Travis Watkins - (redshirt) Sophomore; 24 - Luke Lowery - Junior; 25 - Eric Tyler - Sophomore; Infielders: 3 - Charlie Yorgen - Sophomore; 4 - Hunter Allen - Senior; 5 - Jack Owens - Freshman; 8 - Cameron Snow - (redshirt) Freshman; 9 - Kirk Morgan - Sophomore; 11 - Tyler Strawn - Junior; 20 - Jackson Mims - Freshman; 26 - Bryce Harman - Sophomore	Outfielders: 2 - Garrett Brooks - Junior; 7 - Bailey Sugg - Freshman; 14 - Jeff Nelson - Junior

=== Coaching staff ===
Name	Position	Seasons at East Carolina	Alma mater
Cliff Godwin	Head coach	1	East Carolina University (2000)
Jeff Palumbo	Assistant coach	1	George Mason University (2004)
Dan Roszel	Pitching Coach	5	University of North Florida (2000)

== Season ==
=== February ===
The Pirates opened their season on February 13 against Virginia, as part of a home-and-home series. The Pirates traveled to Charlottesville, Virginia, in 2014, and were swept in a three-game series. Once again, the Cavaliers swept the Pirates, this time over the first weekend of the 2015 season. The Pirates struggled offensively, and scored just five runs over the entire series. Josh Sborz collected two saves for Virginia. The following Wednesday, the Pirates were scheduled to visit Old Dominion, but bad weather caused a postponement until April. The following week, the Pirates' home game against the Monarchs on the 25th was also pushed until March 4.

On the second weekend of the season, weather related issues caused a shakeup to the schedule of the annual Keith LeClair Classic hosted by ECU. All Friday games were cancelled, and Michigan, who was originally scheduled to participate (along with Liberty and St. John's), was replaced by UNC Greensboro. East Carolina went 1–2 on the weekend, defeating St. John's and UNC Greensboro, but falling to Liberty, to win the classic for the third consecutive year.

The Pirates closed the month of February (and opened the month of March in the finale) with a three-game series against Albany. Originally, ECU was scheduled to play in the annual Irish Classic in Cary, North Carolina, but it was cancelled due to weather. The Pirates swept the Great Danes over the three-game series, outscoring them by a cumulative score of 24–7.

=== March ===
In the Pirates' first midweek game of March, they traveled to rival NC State and lost by a score of 0–7, extending their losing streak against the Wolfpack in Raleigh to five games. The following day, the Pirates returned home and hosted Old Dominion in the makeup game of a February 25 postponement. In their 9–7 win, East Carolina broke a 5–5 deadlock with two runs in both the seventh and eight innings, and despite allowing a run in both the eight and ninth innings, held on for their sixth victory of the season.

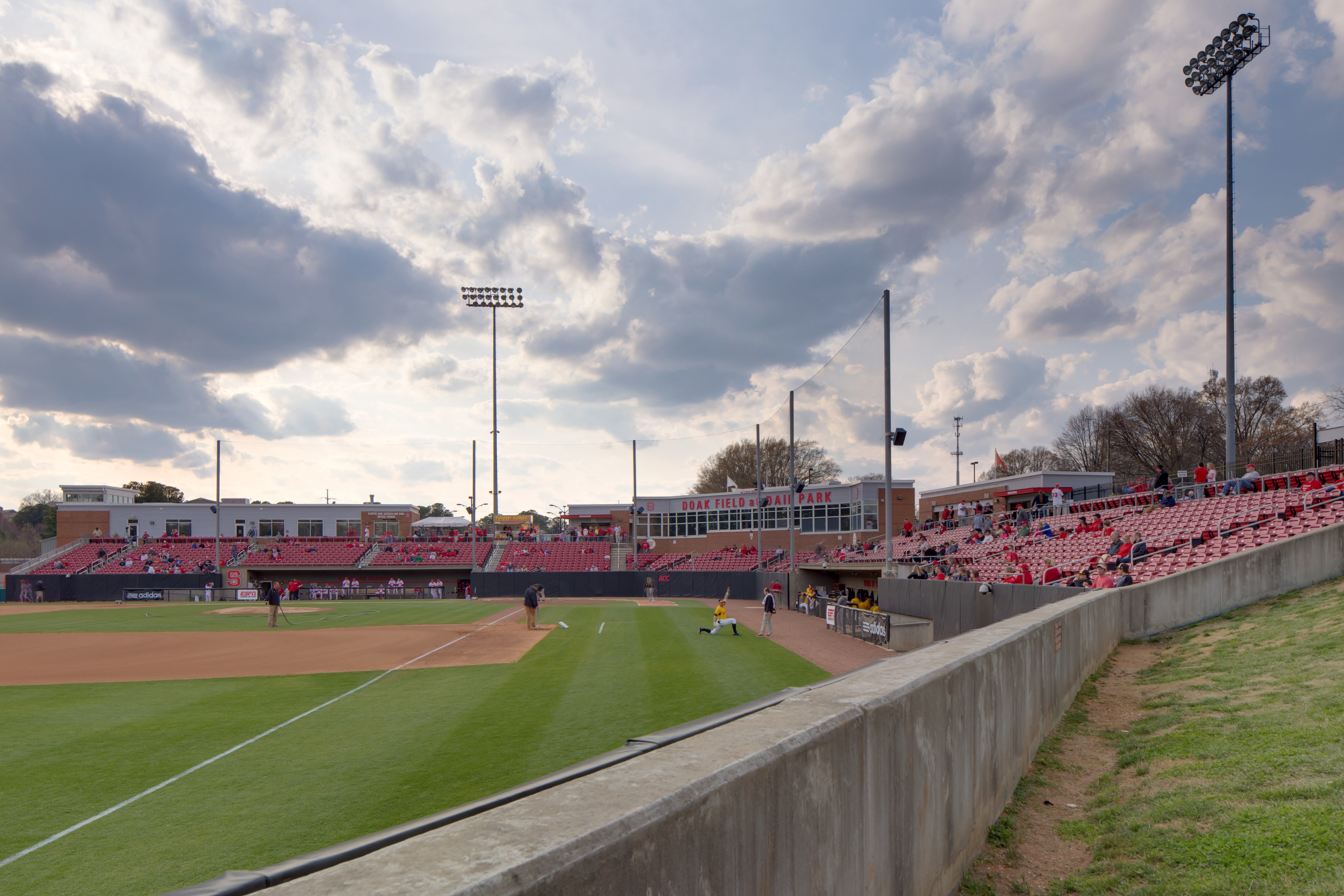
Doak Field, home field of NC State

In their first weekend series in March, the Pirates hosted Monmouth. After the game scheduled for Friday, March 6 was pushed back to Saturday, March 7, as part of a doubleheader, ECU swept the doubleheader against the Hawks, shutting out Monmouth in both games. In the first game of the doubleheader, a 2–0 victory, Evan Kruczynski threw a complete game, two hit shutout. In the second game of the doubleheader, the Pirates scored six runs in the first inning to coast to a 9–0 win. ECU completed the sweep with a 3–2 win on Sunday.

In the second week of March, the Pirates opened with a pair of midweek games. They lost the first game to Campbell 4–9, before rebounding to defeat UNC Greensboro, 8–1. It was the Pirates' second win over UNC Greensboro on the season, after having defeated them on February 21. Over the weekend of March 13, the Pirates traveled to Elon, North Carolina, to play a three-game series with Elon. For the second straight weekend, the Pirates picked up a three-game sweep, after sweeping Monmouth the previous weekend. East Carolina scored 41 runs in the series.

The Pirates hosted Princeton, out of the Ivy League, for a two-game midweek series from March 17–18. The Pirates swept the Tigers over the two-game series to improve their record on the season to 15–6 and extended their winning streak to six games. Following the midweek series against the Tigers, ECU hosted VCU, a traditional midweek opponent, for a three-game weekend series. The Pirates dropped both the first and last games of the series, dropping their first weekend series since opening weekend against Virginia.

== Schedule ==
Legend
	East Carolina win
	East Carolina loss
	Postponement
**Bold**	East Carolina team member

2015 East Carolina Pirates baseball game log
Regular season
February

Date	Opponent	Rank	Site/stadium	Score	Win	Loss	Save	Attendance	Overall record	AAC Record
February 13	No. 3 Virginia		Clark–LeClair Stadium • Greenville, NC	**L** 1–3	Kirby (1–0)	**Kruczynski** (0–1)	Sborz (1)	2,541	0–1	–
February 14	No. 3 Virginia		Clark–LeClair Stadium • Greenville, NC	**L** 2–9	Jones (1–0)	**Wolfe** (0–1)		3,058	0–2	–
February 14	No. 3 Virginia		Clark–LeClair Stadium • Greenville, NC	**L** 2–4	Roberts (1–0)	**Boyd** (0–1)	Sborz (2)	3,058	0–3	–
February 18	at Old Dominion		Bud Metheny Baseball Complex • Norfolk, VA	Postponed Rescheduled for April 15						
February 21	UNC Greensboro		Clark–LeClair Stadium • Greenville, NC	**W** 8–3	**Kruczynski** (1–1)	Clark (1–1)		2,207	1–3	–
February 22	Liberty		Clark–LeClair Stadium • Greenville, NC	**L** 3–4	Clowers (2–0)	**Love** (0–1)		2,207	1–4	–
February 22	St. John's		Clark–LeClair Stadium • Greenville, NC	**W** 9–2	**Lucroy** (1–0)	Magee (0–2)		2,142	2–4	–
February 25	Old Dominion		Clark–LeClair Stadium • Greenville, NC	Postponed Rescheduled for March 4						
February 27	Albany		Clark–LeClair Stadium • Greenville, NC	**W** 5–1	**Kruczynski** (2–1)	Ryan (1–1)	**Love** (1)	482	3–4	–
February 28	Albany		Clark–LeClair Stadium • Greenville, NC	**W** 14–3	**Boyd** (1–1)	Sorgie (0–2)		587	4–4	–

March

Date	Opponent	Rank	Site/stadium	Score	Win	Loss	Save	Attendance	Overall record	AAC Record
March 1	Albany		Clark–LeClair Stadium • Greenville, NC	**W** 5–3	**Morgan** (1–0)	Woods (0–2)	**Love** (2)	422	5–4	–
March 3	at NC State		Doak Field • Raleigh, NC	**L** 0–7	Britt (1–0)	**Boyd** (1–2)		456	5–5	–
March 4	Old Dominion		Clark–LeClair Stadium • Greenville, NC	**W** 9–7	**Morgan** (2–0)	Bainbridge (0–1)	**Ingle** (1)	2,155	6–5	–
March 7	Monmouth		Clark–LeClair Stadium • Greenville, NC	**W** 2–0	**Kruczynski** (3–1)	McKenna (0–2)		2,263	7–5	–
March 7	Monmouth		Clark–LeClair Stadium • Greenville, NC	**W** 9–0	**Wolfe** (1–1)	Trimarco (0–2)		2,263	8–5	–
March 8	Monmouth		Clark–LeClair Stadium • Greenville, NC	**W** 3–2	**Love** (1–1)	Ciavarella (0–3)		2,226	9–5	–
March 10	Campbell		Clark–LeClair Stadium • Greenville, NC	**L** 4–9	Thompkins (3–0)	**Boyd** (1–3)		2,150	9–6	–
March 11	UNC Greensboro		Clark–LeClair Stadium • Greenville, NC	**W** 8–1	**Morgan** (3–0)	Betts (0–1)		1,928	10–6	–
March 13	at Elon		Walter C. Latham Park • Elon, NC	**W** 10–3	**Kruczynski** (4–1)	Harris (2–1)		161	11–6	–
March 14	at Elon		Walter C. Latham Park • Elon, NC	**W** 11–8	**Love** (2–1)	McGillicuddy (0–1)		318	12–6	–
March 15	at Elon		Walter C. Latham Park • Elon, NC	**W** 20–4	**Lucroy** (2–0)	Stalzer (1–3)		615	13–6	–
March 17	Princeton		Clark–LeClair Stadium • Greenville, NC	**W** 11–2	**Boyd** (2–3)	Donatiello (0–1)		2,239	14–6	–
March 18	Princeton		Clark–LeClair Stadium • Greenville, NC	**W** 8–3	**Durazo** (1–0)	Bodurian (0–1)	**Love** (3)	2,015	15–6	–
March 20	VCU		Clark–LeClair Stadium • Greenville, NC	**L** 3–4	Lees (3–0)	**Boyd** (2–4)	Concepcion (3)	2,069	15–7	–
March 21	VCU		Clark–LeClair Stadium • Greenville, NC	**W** 9–3	**Morgan** (4–0)	Gill (0–2)		2,862	16–7	–
March 22	VCU		Clark–LeClair Stadium • Greenville, NC	**L** 2–3	Lees (4–0)	**Boyd** (2–5)	Concepcion (4)	2,295	16–8	–
March 24	at UNC Wilmington		Brooks Field • Wilmington, NC	**L** 2–4	Barnes (4–0)	**Love** (2–2)	Gesell (2)	1,635	16–9	–
March 25	High Point		Clark–LeClair Stadium • Greenville, NC	**L** 2–13	Hennessey (1–2)	**Boyd** (2–6)		2,290	16–10	–
March 28	Memphis		Clark–LeClair Stadium • Greenville, NC	**W** 4–1	**Kruczynski** (5–1)	Wallingford (3–2)		2,315	17–10	1–0
March 28	Memphis		Clark–LeClair Stadium • Greenville, NC	**L** 2–3	Myers (1–0)	**Boyd** (2–7)	Blackwood (8)	2,315	17–11	1–1
March 29	Memphis		Clark–LeClair Stadium • Greenville, NC	**L** 2–4	Myers (2–0)	**Lucroy** (2–1)	Blackwood (9)	2,051	17–12	1–2

April

Date	Opponent	Rank	Site/stadium	Score	Win	Loss	Save	Attendance	Overall record	AAC Record
April 2	Tulane		Clark–LeClair Stadium • Greenville, NC	**W** 3–0	**Love** (3–2)	Merrill (1–3)		2,213	18–12	2–2
April 3	Tulane		Clark–LeClair Stadium • Greenville, NC	**W** 11–4	**Boyd** (3–7)	Rankin (3–1)		2,411	19–12	3–2
April 4	Tulane		Clark–LeClair Stadium • Greenville, NC	**L** 6–8	Massey (2–2)	**Lucroy** (2–2)	Duester (2)	2,261	19–13	3–3
April 7	at Campbell		Jim Perry Stadium • Buies Creek, NC	**W** 7–5	**Wolfe** (2–1)	Long (3–1)	**Love** (4)	828	20–13	–
April 10	at South Florida		USF Baseball Stadium • Tampa, FL	**L** 1–2	Herget (6–1)	Love (3–3)	Peterson (11)	862	20–14	3–4
April 11	at South Florida		USF Baseball Stadium • Tampa, FL	**L** 0–10	Mulholland (4–4)	**Kruczynski** (5–2)		868	20–15	3–5
April 12	at South Florida		USF Baseball Stadium • Tampa, FL	**W** 6–0	**Durazo** (2–0)	Cavallardo (3–1)	**Boyd** (1)	517	21–15	4–5
April 15	at Old Dominion		Bud Metheny Baseball Complex • Norfolk, VA	**W** 4–2	**Boyd** (4–7)	Mathesson (2–6)	**Durazo** (1)	445	22–15	–
April 17	at Connecticut		J. O. Christian Field • Storrs, CT	**W** 7–3	**Kruczynski** (6–2)	Cross (7–2)	**Durazo** (2)	71	23–15	5–5
April 18	at Connecticut		J. O. Christian Field • Storrs, CT	**L** 3–7	Kay (6–3)	**Lucroy** (2–3)	Ruotolo (5)	305	23–16	5–6
April 19	at Connecticut		J. O. Christian Field • Storrs, CT	**W** 4–3 (10)	**Voliva** (1–0)	Darras (2–2)	**Wolfe** (1)	287	24–16	6–6
April 21	NC State		Clark–LeClair Stadium • Greenville, NC	**W** 6–5	**Voliva**(2–0)	O'Donnell (5–3)		3,821	25–16	–
April 22	Duke		Clark–LeClair Stadium • Greenville, NC	**W** 3–2	**Boyd** (5–7)	Koplove (1–2)		3,271	26–16	–
April 24	UCF		Clark–LeClair Stadium • Greenville, NC	**W** 6–5	**Durazo** (3–0)	Hukari (4–3)		2,446	27–16	7–6
April 25	UCF		Clark–LeClair Stadium • Greenville, NC	**W** 3–2	**Love** (4–3)	Finfrock (6–4)	**Ingle** (1)	2,441	28–16	8–6
April 26	UCF		Clark–LeClair Stadium • Greenville, NC	**W** 6–5	**Wolfe** (3–1)	Howell (4–6)	Voliva (1)	2,069	29–16	9–6
April 29	Liberty		Liberty Baseball Stadium • Lynchburg, VA	**L** 0–5	Pennington (1–1)	**Lucroy** (2–4)		791	29–17	–

May

Date	Opponent	Rank	Site/stadium	Score	Win	Loss	Save	Attendance	Overall record	AAC Record
May 1	Connecticut		Clark–LeClair Stadium • Greenville, NC	**L** 2–13	Cross (9–2)	**Kruczynski** (6–3)		2,272	29–18	9–7
May 2	Connecticut		Clark–LeClair Stadium • Greenville, NC	**W** 5–4	**Love** (5–3)	Kay (6–5)		3,034	30–18	10–7
May 3	Connecticut		Clark–LeClair Stadium • Greenville, NC	**W** 5–2	**Wolfe** (4–1)	Tabakman (2–4)	**Ingle** (3)	3,012	31–18	11–7
May 8	at No. 28 Houston		Cougar Field • Houston, TX	**L** 1–10	Lantrip (7–3)	**Kruczynski** (6–4)		1,691	31–19	11–8
May 9	at No. 28 Houston		Cougar Field • Houston, TX	**W** 4–1	**Love** (6–3)	Dowdy (7–2)	**Ingle** (4)	2,013	32–19	12–8
May 10	at No. 28 Houston		Cougar Field • Houston, TX	**L** 1–11	Romero (7–3)	**Wolfe** (4–2)		1,408	32–20	12–9
May 12	Elon		Clark–LeClair Stadium • Greenville, NC	**W** 7–1	**Lucroy** (3–4)	Jones (0–1)		2,585	33–20	–
May 14	at Cincinnati		Marge Schott Stadium • Cincinnati, OH	**W** 7–3	**Love** (7–3)	Atkinson (4–6)		602	34–20	13–9
May 15	at Cincinnati		Marge Schott Stadium • Cincinnati, OH	**W** 6–4	**Kruczynski** (7–4)	Zeller (2–4)	**Ingle** (5)	677	35–20	14–9
May 16	at Cincinnati		Marge Schott Stadium • Cincinnati, OH	**W** 8–7	**Durazo** (4–0)	Patishall (0–3)	**Ingle** (6)	1,036	36–20	15–9

Postseason
AAC Tournament

Date	Opponent	Rank	Site/stadium	Score	Win	Loss	Save	Attendance	Overall record	AACT Record
May 20	(7) UCF	(2)	Bright House Field • Clearwater, FL	**W** 4–3	**Ingle** (1–0)	Rodgers (10–1)			37–20	1–0
May 21	(3) Tulane	(2)	Bright House Field • Clearwater, FL	**W** 3–1	**Kruczynski** (8–4)	Merrill (4–6)	**Ingle** (7)	1,243	38–20	2–0
May 23	(6) UConn	(2)	Bright House Field • Clearwater, FL	**W** 4–2	**Wofle** (5–2)	Montgomerie (3–2)	**Ingle** (8)	1,136	39–20	3–0
May 24	(1) No. 23 Houston	(2)	Bright House Field • Clearwater, FL (Championship)	**W** 9–1	**Durazo** (5–0)	Romero (7–4)		1,037	40–20	4–0

NCAA tournament – Coral Gables (Fla.) Regional

Date	Opponent	Rank	Site/stadium	Score	Win	Loss	Save	Attendance	Overall record	NCAAT Record
May 29	(3) Columbia	(2)	Mark Light Field • Coral Gables, FL	**L** 3–6	Thanopoulos (6–5)	**Durazo** (5–1)	Cline (2)	1,845	40–21	0–1
May 30	(4) FIU	(2)	Mark Light Field • Coral Gables, FL	**L** 0–2	Dopico (3–4)	**Love** (7–4)		1,929	40–22	0–2

All rankings from Collegiate Baseball.
