= 2015 UCF Knights baseball team =

American college baseball season

2015 UCF Knights baseball
- Conference: American Athletic Conference
- Record: 31–27 (9–14 The American)
- Head coach: Terry Rooney (7th season)
- Assistant coaches: Kevin Schnall (3rd season); Ryan Klosterman (4th season)
- Home stadium: Jay Bergman Field

2015 American Athletic Conference baseball standings
	Conf.						Overall
Team	W		L		T	PCT	W		L		T	PCT
Houston ‍†‍‍^{y}	16	–	8	–	0	.667	43	–	20	–	0	.683
East Carolina‡^{y} ‍‍‍	15	–	9	–	0	.625	40	–	22	–	0	.645
Tulane ‍‍‍^{y}	13	–	11	–	0	.542	35	–	25	–	0	.583
South Florida^{y} ‍‍‍	13	–	11	–	0	.542	34	–	26	–	1	.566
Memphis ‍‍‍	12	–	12	–	0	.500	37	–	21	–	0	.638
Connecticut ‍‍‍	11	–	13	–	0	.458	35	–	25	–	0	.583
UCF ‍‍‍	10	–	14	–	0	.417	31	–	27	–	0	.534
Cincinnati ‍‍‍	6	–	18	–	0	.250	15	–	41	–	0	.268
† – Conference champion ‡ – Tournament champion y – Invited to the NCAA tournament As of June 30, 2015; Rankings from Collegiate Baseball

The 2015 UCF Knights baseball team represented the University of Central Florida during the 2015 NCAA Division I baseball season. The Knights played their home games at Jay Bergman Field as a member of the American Athletic Conference. They were led by head coach Terry Rooney, in his seventh season at UCF.

== Previous season ==
In 2014, the Knights finished the season 2nd in the American with a record of 36–23, 17–7 in conference play. They qualified for the 2014 American Athletic Conference baseball tournament and were eliminated in pool play. They failed to qualify for the 2014 NCAA Division I baseball tournament.

== Personnel ==
=== Roster ===
2015 UCF Knights roster
Pitchers: 4 - Cre Finfrock - Freshman; 22 - Kyle Marsh - Freshman; 25 - Pat Stephens - Freshman; 27 - Spencer Davis - (redshirt) Senior; 28 - Tanner Olson - Senior; 32 - Parker Thomas - Senior; 33 - Harrison Hukari - (redshirt) Junior; 34 - Mitchell Tripp - (redshirt) Junior; 36 - Brad Rowley - Freshman; 38 - Joe Marotta - Senior; 39 - Zach Rodgers - Senior; 40 - Drew Faintich - Sophomore; 41 - Robby Howell - Sophomore; 42 - Trent Thompson - Sophomore; 43 - Eric Hepple - Freshman; 44 - Ryan Meyer - (redshirt) Junior	Catchers: 23 - Logan Heiser - Freshman; 24 - Kyle Perkins - Sophomore; 29 - Jordan Savinon - Senior; 30 - Matt Diorio - Sophomore; Infielders: 2 - Dylan Moore - Senior; 3 - Kam Gellinger - Sophomore; 5 - Brooks Morgan - Sophomore; 12 - Sam Bates - Junior; 13 - James Vasquez - Senior; 14 - Tommy Williams - Senior; 15 - Tyler Hayden - Sophomore	Outfielders: 6 - JoMarcos Woods - Senior; 10 - Erik Barber - Senior; 11 - Dalton Duty - Sophomore; 16 - Sam Tolleson - Senior; 17 - Derrick Salberg - Senior; 18 - Eugene Vazquez - Sophomore; 20 - Josh Moser - Freshman

=== Coaching staff ===
Name	Position	Seasons at UCF	Alma mater
Terry Rooney	Head coach	7	Radford University (1996)
Kevin Schnall	Assistant coach	3	Coastal Carolina University (2001)
Ryan Klosterman	Assistant coach	4	Vanderbilt University (2004)

== Schedule ==
Legend
	UCF win
	UCF loss
**Bold**	UCF team member

2015 UCF Knights baseball game log
Regular season
February

Date	Opponent	Rank	Site or stadium	Score	Win	Loss	Save	Attendance	Overall record	AAC record
February 13	Siena		Jay Bergman Field • Orlando, Florida,	**W** 4–1	**Rodgers** (1–0)	Goossens (0–1)	**Davis** (1)	1,543	1–0	–
February 14	Siena		Jay Bergman Field • Orlando, Florida	**W** 13–4	**Howell** (1–0)	Morales (0–1)		1,154	2–0	–
February 15	Siena		Jay Bergman Field • Orlando, Florida	**W** 11–0	**Finfrock** (1–0)	Ahearn (0–1)		1,135	3–0	–
February 17	Bethune-Cookman		Jay Bergman Field • Orlando, Florida	**W** 10–2	**Meyer** (1–0)	O'Brien (0–1)		989	4–0	–
February 20	vs. Arkansas		Eddie Stanky Field • Mobile, Alabama	**W** 9–5	**Hukari** (1–0)	Taccolini (1–1)	**Davis** (2)	75	5–0	–
February 21	vs. #27 Maryland		Eddie Stanky Field • Mobile, Alabama	**W** 7–6	**Finfrock** (2–0)	Stiles (0–1)	**Marsh** (1)	79	6–0	–
February 22	at South Alabama		Eddie Stanky Field • Mobile, Alabama	**W** 7–5	**Howell** (2–0)	McMullen (0–1)	**Thompson** (1)	1,389	7–0	–
February 25	at Bethune-Cookman	#17	Jackie Robinson Ballpark • Dayton Beach, Florida,	**W** 18–8	**Hepple** (1–0)	Norris (0–1)		157	8–0	–
February 27	Ole Miss	#17	Jay Bergman Field • Orlando, Florida	**W** 5–4	**Hukari** (2–0)	Short (1–1)		2,037	9–0	–

March

Date	Opponent	Rank	Site or stadium	Score	Win	Loss	Save	Attendance	Overall record	AAC record
March 1	Ole Miss	#17	Jay Bergman Field • Orlando, Florida	**W** 3–2 ^{(7)}	**Finfrock** (3–0)	Bramlett (2–1)	**Hukari** (1)	1,646	10–0	–
March 1	Ole Miss	#17	Jay Bergman Field • Orlando, Florida	**L** 3–4	Short (2–1)	**Thompson** (0–1)		1,646	10–1	–
March 3	#5 Florida	#10	Jay Bergman Field • Orlando, Florida	**W** 4–3	**Hukari** (3–0)	Poyner (0–1)	**Thompson** (2)	4,319	11–1	–
March 4	at #5 Florida	#10	Alfred A. McKethan Stadium • Gainesville, Florida,	**L** 2–10	Snead (1–0)	**Hepple** (1–1)		2,705	11–2	–
March 6	Columbia	#10	Jay Bergman Field • Orlando, Florida	**W** 9–1	**Rodgers** (2–0)	Thanopoulos (0–2)		1,001	12–2	–
March 7	Columbia	#10	Jay Bergman Field • Orlando, Florida	**W** 5–1	**Finfrock** (4–0)	Roy (0–1)	**Hukari** (2)	1,111	13–2	–
March 8	Columbia	#10	Jay Bergman Field • Orlando, Florida	**W** 9–3	**Howell** (3–0)	Marks (0–1)		1,075	14–2	–
March 10	at #11 Florida State	#9	Dick Howser Stadium • Tallahassee, Florida,	**L** 8–11	Byrd (3–0)	**Marsh** (0–1)	Strode (7)	3,980	14–3	–
March 11	at #11 Florida State	#9	Dick Howser Stadium • Tallahassee, Florida	**L** 11–15	Deise (1–0)	**Thompson** (0–2)		3,728	14–4	–
March 13	Fairfield	#9	Jay Bergman Field • Orlando, Florida	**W** 11–1	**Finfrock** (5–0)	Ashworth (0–1)		972	15–4	–
March 14	Fairfield	#9	Jay Bergman Field • Orlando, Florida	**W** 6–5	**Howell** (4–0)	Panciera (0–1)	**Hukari** (3)	1,038	16–4	–
March 15	Fairfield	#9	Jay Bergman Field • Orlando, Florida	**W** 16–10	**Hepple** (2–0)	Wallace (0–2)		1,380	17–4	–
March 17	at Bethune-Cookman	#10	Jackie Robinson Ballpark • Daytona Beach, Florida	**W** 18–13	**Meyer** (2–0)	Duprey (0–3)	**Rodgers** (1)	103	18–4	–
March 20	Presbyterian	#10	Jay Bergman Field • Orlando, Florida	**W** 6–5	**Rodgers** (3–0)	Wortkoetter (3–3)		1,162	19–4	–
March 21	Presbyterian	#10	Jay Bergman Field • Orlando, Florida	**L** 6–8	Sauer (3–1)	**Howell** (4–1)	Kehner (2)	1,092	19–5	–
March 22	Presbyterian	#10	Jay Bergman Field • Orlando, Florida	**W** 18–4	**Hepple** (3–1)	Lesiak (1–2)		1,252	20–5	–
March 24	at Jacksonville	#8	John Sessions Stadium • Jacksonville, Florida,	**L** 9–13	Stockton (2–1)	**Hukari** (3–2)		190	20–6	–
March 27	#15 Houston	#8	Jay Bergman Field • Orlando, Florida	**W** 9–2	**Finfrock** (6–0)	Lantrip (5–1)		1,397	21–6	1–0
March 28	#15 Houston	#6	Jay Bergman Field • Orlando, Florida	**L** 5–7	Dowdy (3–0)	**Howell** (4–2)	Romero (4)	1,555	21–7	1–1
March 29	#15 Houston	#6	Jay Bergman Field • Orlando, Florida	**W** 4–3	**Rodgers** (4–0)	Romero (3–2)		1,281	22–7	2–1
March 31	#22 Florida Atlantic	#6	Jay Bergman Field • Orlando, Florida	**L** 5–11	Labsan (2–0)	**Thompson** (0–3)		1,685	22–8	2–1

April

Date	Opponent	Rank	Site or stadium	Score	Win	Loss	Save	Attendance	Overall record	AAC record
April 2	at Cincinnati	–	Marge Schott Stadium • Cincinnati, Ohio,	**L** 1–4	Atkinson (2–3)	**Finfrock** (6–1)	Zellner (1)	267	22–9	2–2
April 3	at Cincinnati	#6	Marge Schott Stadium • Cincinnati, Ohio	**L** 3–5	Orndorff (1–1)	**Howell** (4–3)	Zellner (2)	233	22–10	2–3
April 4	at Cincinnati	#6	Marge Schott Stadium • Cincinnati, Ohio	**W** 2–1	**Rodgers** (5–0)	Lehnen (1–5)	Zellner (2)	917	23–11	3–3
April 7	Jacksonville	#12	Jay Bergman Field • Orlando, Florida	**W** 6–5	**Hukari** (4–1)	Babb (0–1)		1,386	24–11	3–3
April 10	Connecticut	#12	Jay Bergman Field • Orlando, Florida	**L** 4–6	Cross (7–1)	**Finfrock** (6–2)	Ruotolo (4)	1,271	24–12	3–4
April 11	Connecticut	#12	Jay Bergman Field • Orlando, Florida	**L** 1–15	Kay (5–3)	**Howell** (4–4)		1,061	24–13	3–5
April 12	Connecticut	#12	Jay Bergman Field • Orlando, Florida	**W** 5–1	**Rodgers** (6–0)	Tabakman (2–3)		898	25–13	4–5
April 15	at #6 Miami (Florida)	#15	Alex Rodriguez Park at Mark Light Field • Coral Gables, Florida,	**L** 2–4	Mediavilla (2–1)	**Hukari**(4–2)	Garcia (8)	2,184	25–14	4–5
April 17	at Tulane	#15	Greer Field • New Orleans, Louisiana,	**L** 0–3	Merrill (2–3)	**Finfrock** (6–3)	Gibaut (2)	1,106	25–15	4–6
April 18	at Tulane	#15	Greer Field • New Orleans, Louisiana	**W** 8–0	**Rodgers** (7–0)	Gibbs (3–2)		1,824	26–16	5–6
April 19	at Tulane	#15	Greer Field • New Orleans, Louisiana	**L** 0–10 (7)	Massey (4–2)	**Hepple** (3–2)	Gibaut (3)	1,290	26–16	5–7
April 21	North Florida	#24	Jay Bergman Field • Orlando, Florida	**L** 3–9	Vansickle (1–1)	**Howell** (4–5)		1,155	26–17	5–7
April 24	at East Carolina	#24	Clark–LeClair Stadium • Greenville, North Carolina,	**L** 5–6	Durazo (3–0)	**Hukari** (4–3)		2,446	26–18	5–8
April 25	at East Carolina	#24	Clark–LeClair Stadium • Greenville, North Carolina	**L** 2–3	Reid (4–3)	**Finfrock** (6–4)	Ingle (1)	2,441	26–19	5–9
April 26	at East Carolina	#24	Clark–LeClair Stadium • Greenville, North Carolina	**L** 5–6	Wolfe (3–1)	'Howell (4–6)	Voliva (1)	2,069	26–20	5–10

May

Date	Opponent	Rank	Site or stadium	Score	Win	Loss	Save	Attendance	Overall record	AAC record
May 1	South Florida	–	Jay Bergman Field • Orlando, Florida	**W** 3–0					27–19	6–10
May 2	South Florida	–	Jay Bergman Field • Orlando, Florida	**W** 2–1	**Rodgers** (8–0)	Herget (7–2)	**Hukari** (3)	1,557	28–19	7–10
May 3	South Florida	–	Jay Bergman Field • Orlando, Florida	**L** 3–9	**Finfrock** (7–4)	Farley (3–2)		1,213	28–20	7–11
May 6	at #12 Florida Atlantic	–	FAU Baseball Stadium • Boca Raton, Florida	**L** 2–10	McKay (3–0)	**Meyer** (2–1)		474	28–21	7–11
May 8	Memphis	–	Jay Bergman Field • Orlando, Florida	**W** 10–2	**Rodgers** (9–0)	Gunn (5–1)		987	29–21	8–11
May 9	Memphis	–	Jay Bergman Field • Orlando, Florida	**L** 5–6	Toscano (8–1)	**Finfrock** (7–5)	Blackwood (13)	1,041	29–22	8–12
May 10	Memphis	–	Jay Bergman Field • Orlando, Florida	**W** 4–1	**Howell** (5–7)	Alexander (4–1)	**Hukari** (5)	885	30–22	9–12
May 12	at North Florida	–	Harmon Stadium • Jacksonville, Florida	**L** 5–10	Smith (5–1)	**Davis** (0–1)		449	30–23	9–12
May 14	at South Florida	–	USF Baseball Stadium • Tampa, Florida,	**W** 12–9	**Rodgers** (10–0)	Herget (8–3)		706	31–23	10–12
May 15	at South Florida	–	USF Baseball Stadium • Tampa, Florida	**L** 3–7	Farley (4–2)	**Hukari** (4–4)		508	31–24	10–13
May 16	at South Florida	–	USF Baseball Stadium • Tampa, Florida	**L** 4–5	Mulholland (5–7)	**Howell** (5–8)	Peterson (15)	1,311	31–25	10–14

Postseason
The American Tournament

Date	Opponent	Rank	Site or stadium	Score	Win	Loss	Save	Attendance	Overall record	AACT Record
May 20	#2 East Carolina	–	Bright House Field • Clearwater, Florida,	**L** 3–4	Ingle (1–0)	**Rodgers** (10–1)			31–26	0–1
May 21	#6 Connecticut	–	Bright House Field • Clearwater, Florida	**L** 3–4 (11)	Kay (8–6)	**Howell** (5–9)			31–27	0–2

All rankings from Collegiate Baseball.

== Rankings ==
Ranking movements Legend: ██ Increase in ranking ██ Decrease in ranking — = Not ranked RV = Received votes
	Week																		
Poll	Pre	1	2	3	4	5	6	7	8	9	10	11	12	13	14	15	16	17	Final
Coaches'	—	—*	—	14	10	14	11												
Baseball America	22	22	15	13	6	7	6												
Collegiate Baseball^	RV	RV	17	10	9	10	8												
NCBWA†	34	26	21	18	12	15	9												

^ Collegiate Baseball ranked 40 teams in their preseason poll, but only ranked 30 teams weekly during the season.
† NCBWA ranks 30 teams in their preseason poll, but only ranks 25 teams weekly during the season.
* A new poll was not released for this week, so for comparison purposes, the previous week's ranking is inserted in this week's slot.

== Awards and honors ==
Zach Rodgers

- Pre-season All-AAC

Dylan Moore

- Pre-season All-AAC

Matt Diorio

- Pre-season All-AAC
