= 2015 Tulane Green Wave baseball team =

American college baseball season

2015 Tulane Green Wave baseball
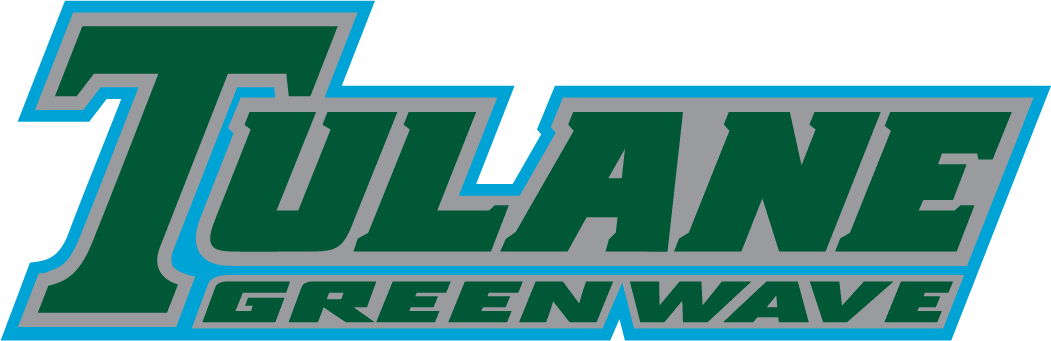

Baton Rouge Regional, 1–2
- Conference: American Athletic Conference
- Record: 35–25 (13–11 The American)
- Head coach: David Pierce (1st season)
- Assistant coaches: Sean Allen (1st season); Philip Miller (1st season)
- Home stadium: Greer Field at Turchin Stadium

2015 American Athletic Conference baseball standings
	Conf.						Overall
Team	W		L		T	PCT	W		L		T	PCT
Houston ‍†‍‍^{y}	16	–	8	–	0	.667	43	–	20	–	0	.683
East Carolina‡^{y} ‍‍‍	15	–	9	–	0	.625	40	–	22	–	0	.645
Tulane ‍‍‍^{y}	13	–	11	–	0	.542	35	–	25	–	0	.583
South Florida^{y} ‍‍‍	13	–	11	–	0	.542	34	–	26	–	1	.566
Memphis ‍‍‍	12	–	12	–	0	.500	37	–	21	–	0	.638
Connecticut ‍‍‍	11	–	13	–	0	.458	35	–	25	–	0	.583
UCF ‍‍‍	10	–	14	–	0	.417	31	–	27	–	0	.534
Cincinnati ‍‍‍	6	–	18	–	0	.250	15	–	41	–	0	.268
† – Conference champion ‡ – Tournament champion y – Invited to the NCAA tournament As of June 30, 2015; Rankings from Collegiate Baseball

The 2015 Tulane Green Wave baseball team represented Tulane University during the 2015 NCAA Division I baseball season. The Green Wave played their home games at Greer Field at Turchin Stadium as a member of the American Athletic Conference. They were led by head coach David Pierce, in his first season at Tulane.

== Previous season ==
In 2014, the Green Wave finished the season 10th in Conference USA with a record of 23–29, 10–18 in conference play. They failed to qualify for the 2014 Conference USA baseball tournament or the 2014 NCAA Division I baseball tournament.

== Personnel ==
=== Roster ===
2015 Tulane Green Wave roster
Pitchers: 5 – Tim Yandel – Junior; 13 – Jackson Johnson – Freshman; 14 – J.P. France – Sophomore; 20 – Eric Steel – (redshirt) Sophomore; 21 – Corey Merrill – Sophomore; 24 – Jake Crain – Freshman; 26 – Zach Flowers – Sophomore; 28 – Alex Massey – (redshirt) Junior; 29 – Emerson Gibbs – Junior; 31 – Patrick Duester – Junior; 32 – Sam Bjorngjeld – (redshirt) Freshman; 33 – Ian Gibaut – Junior; 36 – Jordan Gross – (redshirt) Junior; 37 – Brandon Sequeira – Freshman; 38 – Dan Rankin – (redshirt) Sophomore; 41 – Max Karp – Freshman; 42 – Troy Ward – Junior; 44 – Brandon Issa – Freshman; 45 – Tyler Zamjahn – Sophomore; 46 – Trevor Simms – Senior	Catchers: 4 – Jake Rogers – Sophomore; 18 – Jeremy Montalbano – Junior; 35 – Cameron Burns – Junior; Infielders: 1 – Garrett Deschamp – Senior; 2 – Stephen Alemais – Sophomore; 15 – Rainer Ausmus – Freshman; 16 – Hunter Hope – Sophomore; 17 – Jake Willsey – Sophomore; 30 – Nico Symington – Freshman; 34 – Sam Martin – Freshman; 39 – Hunter Williams – Sophomore; 40 – Tyler Wilson – Senior; 48 – Hunter Lapeyre – (redshirt) Sophomore	Outfielders: 6 – Lex Kaplan – Sophomore; 8 – Richard Carthon – Junior; 9 – John Gandolfo – Senior; 23 – Grant Brown – Sophomore

=== Coaching staff ===
Name	Position	Seasons at Tulane	Alma mater
David Pierce	Head coach	1	University of Houston (1988)
Sean Allen	Assistant coach	1	University of Houston (2001)
Philip Miller	Assistant coach	1	Northwestern State University (2005)

== Schedule ==
Legend
	Tulane win
	Tulane loss
	Postponement
**Bold**	Tulane team member

2015 Tulane Green Wave baseball game log
Regular season
February

Date	Opponent	Rank	Site/stadium	Score	Win	Loss	Save	Attendance	Overall record	AAC Record
February 13	at Pepperdine		Eddy D. Field Stadium • Malibu, CA	**W** 9–3	**Steel** (1–0)	Puckett (0–1)		435	1–0	–
February 14	at Pepperdine		Eddy D. Field Stadium • Malibu, CA	**W** 9–5	**Rankin** (1–0)	Blanchard (0–1)		410	2–0	–
February 15	at Pepperdine		Eddy D. Field Stadium • Malibu, CA	**L** 1–2	Gamboa (1–0)	**Gibaut** (0–1)		403	2–1	–
February 18	at Southeastern Louisiana		Pat Kenelly Diamond • Hammond, LA	**W** 5–4	**Gibaut** (1–1)	Cashman (0–1)	**Rankin** (1)	906	3–1	–
February 20	San Francisco		Greer Field • New Orleans, LA	**W** 1–0	**Gibbs** (1–0)	Buonopane (0–1)		2,225	4–1	–
February 21	San Francisco		Greer Field • New Orleans, LA	**W** 3–2 ^{(11)}	**Gibaut** (2–1)	Narahara (0–1)		2,351	5–1	–
February 22	San Francisco		Greer Field • New Orleans, LA	**W** 5–3	**Yandel** (1–0)	Rincon (0–2)	**Steel** (1)	2,617	6–1	–
February 24	at New Orleans		Maestri Field • New Orleans, LA	**W** 9–0	**Duester** (1–0)	Martinez (0–1)	**Johnson** (1)	609	7–1	–
February 25	New Orleans		Greer Field • New Orleans, LA	**W** 4–0	**Gibbs** (2–0)	Smith (1–1)		1,681	8–1	–
February 27	Creighton		Greer Field • New Orleans, LA	**W** 8–2	**Merrill** (1–0)	Albrecht (1–1)		1,700	9–1	–
February 28	Creighton		Greer Field • New Orleans, LA	**L** 2–7	Warren (1–1)	**Massey** (0–1)		2,108	9–2	–

March

Date	Opponent	Rank	Site/stadium	Score	Win	Loss	Save	Attendance	Overall record	AAC Record
March 1	Creighton		Greer Field • New Orleans, LA	**W** 3–2	**Gibaut** (3–1)	Ising (0–1)		2,000	10–2	–
March 3	at Nicholls State		Ray E. Didier Field • Thibodaux, LA	**W** 5–0	**Duester** (2–0)	Ernestine (1–1)	**Gibbs** (1)	1,378	11–2	–
March 6	Gonzaga		Greer Field • New Orleans, LA	**L** 0–2	Bailey (3–1)	**Merrill** (1–1)	Bigelow (3)	1,905	11–3	–
March 7	Gonzaga		Greer Field • New Orleans, LA	**L** 2–7	Sopko (2–1)	**Massey** (0–2)	Mills (2)	2,403	11–4	–
March 8	Gonzaga		Greer Field • New Orleans, LA	**W** 3–0	**Yandel** (2–0)	Burland (0–1)	**Gibaut** (1)	2,113	12–4	–
March 11	at Southern Miss		Pete Taylor Park • Hattiesburg, MS	**L** 4–8	Cockrell (2–0)	**Duster** (2–1)		2,559	12–5	–
March 13	Xavier		Greer Field • New Orleans, LA	**W** 3–2 ^{(10)}	**Gibaut** (4–1)	Lowther (0–1)		1,504	13–5	–
March 14	Xavier		Greer Field • New Orleans, LA	**W** 1–0	**Rankin** (2–0)	Jacknewitz (1–3)		1,935	14–5	–
March 15	Xavier		Greer Field • New Orleans, LA	**W** 10–3	**Massey** (1–2)	Astle (0–3)		1,904	15–5	–
March 17	Southeastern Louisiana		Greer Field • New Orleans, LA	**W** 15–2	**Duester** (3–1)	Cashman (2–3)		2,311	16–5	–
March 20	at UC Riverside		Riverside Sports Complex • Riverside, CA	**L** 1–2 ^{(13)}	Genter (3–0)	**Gibaut** (4–2)		355	16–6	–
March 21	at UC Riverside		Riverside Sports Complex • Riverside, CA	**W** 6–5	**Rankin** (3–0)	Lillie (0–1)	**Duester** (1)	240	17–6	–
March 22	at UC Riverside		Riverside Sports Complex • Riverside, CA	**L** 2–6	Leach (2–2)	**Yandel** (2–1)		273	17–7	–
March 24	LSU		Greer Field • New Orleans, LA	**L** 7–13	Newman (2–0)	**Duester** (3–2)		4,994	17–8	–
March 27	Connecticut		Greer Field • New Orleans, LA	**L** 0–6	Cross (6–1)	**Merrill** (1–2)		1,887	17–9	0–1
March 28	Connecticut		Greer Field • New Orleans, LA	**W** 5–1	**Gibbs** (3–0)	Kay (3–3)		2,015	18–9	1–1
March 29	Connecticut		Greer Field • New Orleans, LA	**L** 3–5	Ruotolo (2–0)	**Gibaut** (4–3)		1,950	18–10	1–2
March 31	at UNC Wilmington		Brooks Field • Wilmington, NC	**W** 8–4	**Duester** (4–2)	Magestro (3–2)	**Steel** (2)	1,008	19–10	1–2

April

Date	Opponent	Rank	Site/stadium	Score	Win	Loss	Save	Attendance	Overall record	AAC Record
April 2	at East Carolina		Clark–LeClair Stadium • Greenville, NC	**L** 0–3	Love (3–2)	**Merrill** (1–3)		2,213	19–11	1–3
April 3	at East Carolina		Clark–LeClair Stadium • Greenville, NC	**L** 4–11	Boyd (3–7)	**Rankin** (3–1)		2,411	19–12	1–4
April 4	at East Carolina		Clark–LeClair Stadium • Greenville, NC	**W** 8–6	**Massey** (2–2)	Lucroy (2–2)	**Duester** (2)	2,261	20–12	2–4
April 7	Nicholls State		Greer Field • New Orleans, LA	**W** 7–1	**Gibaut** 5–3	Stapler (2–1)		1,452	21–12	2–4
April 10	at Houston		Cougar Field • Houston, TX	**L** 3–4	Weigel (3–0)	**Duester** (4–3)		1,583	21–13	2–5
April 11	at Houston		Cougar Field • Houston, TX	**L** 1–6	Dowdy (4–1)	**Gibbs** (3–1)		1,512	21–14	2–6
April 12	at Houston		Cougar Field • Houston, TX	**W** 3–1	**Massey** (3–2)	Cobb (1–1)		1,603	22–14	3–6
April 14	Southern Miss		Greer Field • New Orleans, LA	Postponed						
April 17	UCF		Greer Field • New Orleans, LA	**W** 3–0	**Merrill** (2–3)	Finfrock (6–3)	**Gibaut** (2)	1,106	23–14	4–6
April 18	UCF		Greer Field • New Orleans, LA	**L** 0–8	Rodgers (7–0)	Gibbs (3–2)		1,824	23–15	4–7
April 19	UCF		Greer Field • New Orleans, LA	**W** 10–0	**Massey** (4–2)	Hepple (3–2)	**Gibaut** (3)	1,290	24–15	5–7
April 21	at LSU		Alex Box Stadium • Baton Rouge, LA	**L** 0–6	Bain (1–1)	**Duester** (4–4)		10,614	24–16	5–7
April 24	at Cincinnati		Marge Schott Stadium • Cincinnati, OH	**W** 4–0	**Merrill** (3–0)	Atkinson (3–5)	**Gibaut** (4)	522	25–16	6–7
April 25	at Cincinnati		Marge Schott Stadium • Cincinnati, OH	**W** 8–6	**Duester** (5–4)	Zellner (2–2)		296	26–16	7–7
April 26	at Cincinnati		Marge Schott Stadium • Cincinnati, OH	**W** 9–5	**Massey** (5–2)	Lehnen (1–7)	**Gibaut** (5)	631	27–16	8–7
April 28	Southeastern Louisiana		Greer Field • New Orleans, LA	**W** 5–4 (10)	**Steel** (2–0)	Sceroler (2–2)		1,823	28–16	8–7

May

Date	Opponent	Rank	Site/stadium	Score	Win	Loss	Save	Attendance	Overall record	AAC Record
May 1	Houston		Greer Field • New Orleans, LA	**W** 3–1	**Merrill** 4–3	Lantrip (6–3)	**Gibaut** (6)	1,100	29–16	9–7
May 2	Houston		Greer Field • New Orleans, LA	**L** 0–3	Dowdy (7–1)	**Massey** (7–3)		2,050	29–17	9–8
May 3	Houston		Greer Field • New Orleans, LA	**L** 1–7	Romero (6–3)	**Duester** (5–5)		2,100	29–18	9–9
May 8	South Florida		Greer Field • New Orleans, LA	**L** 0–12	Herget (8–2)	**Merrill** (4–4)		2,678	29–19	9–10
May 9	South Florida		Greer Field • New Orleans, LA	**W** 5–3	**Duester** (6–5)	Valdes (5–2)	**Gibaut** (7)	2,167	30–19	10–10
May 10	South Florida		Greer Field • New Orleans, LA	**W** 4–3	**Gibbs** (4–2)	Mulholland 4–7	**Gibaut** (8)	2,221	31–19	11–10
May 12	Southern Miss		Greer Field • New Orleans, LA	**L** 4–8	Talley (3–5)	**Yandel** (2–2)		2,368	31–20	11–10
May 14	at Memphis		FedExPark • Memphis, TN	**L** 3–7	Gunn (6–1)	**Merrill** (4–5)		678	31–21	11–11
May 15	at Memphis		FedExPark • Memphis, TN	**W** 5–2 (7)	**Massey** (6–3)	Toscano (8–2)		510	32–21	12–11
May 16	at Memphis		FedExPark • Memphis, TN	**W** 9–1	**Gibbs** (5–2)	Alexander (4–2)		510	33–21	13–11

Postseason
AAC Tournament

Date	Opponent	Rank	Site/stadium	Score	Win	Loss	Save	Attendance	Overall record	AACT Record
May 20	vs. (6) Connecticut	(3)	Bright House Field • Clearwater, FL	**W** 3–1	**Duester** (7–5)	Zapata (5–1)	**Gibaut** (9)		34–21	1–0
May 21	vs. (2) East Carolina	(3)	Bright House Field • Clearwater, FL	**L** 1–3	Kruczynski (8–4)	**Merrill** (4–6)	Ingle (7)	1,243	34–22	1–1
May 22	vs. (6) Connecticut	(3)	Bright House Field • Clearwater, FL	**L** 6–7	Holmes (1–0)	**Gibbs** (5–3)	Kay (1)	922	34–23	1–2

NCAA Regionals

Date	Opponent	Rank	Site/stadium	Score	Win	Loss	Save	Attendance	Overall record	NCAAT Record
May 29	vs. (2) UNC Wilmington	(3)	Alex Box Stadium • Baton Rouge, LA	**L** 1–10	Foster (7–1)	**Duester** (7–6)		10,657	34–24	0–1
May 30	vs. (4) Lehigh	(3)	Alex Box Stadium • Baton Rouge, LA	**W** 15–3	**Merrill** (5–6)	Stephens (4–7)	**Yandel** (1)	10,527	35–24	1–1
May 31	vs. (2) UNC Wilmington	(3)	Alex Box Stadium • Baton Rouge, LA	**L** 2–8	Monroe (4–3)	**Massey** (6–4)		10,582	35–25	1–2

All rankings from Collegiate Baseball.
Schedule and results taken from tulanegreenwave.com Archived 2015-07-03 at the Wayback Machine. Box scores are available under "related links" in the right-hand navigation.

== Rankings ==
Ranking movements Legend: ██ Increase in ranking ██ Decrease in ranking — = Not ranked RV = Received votes
	Week																			
Poll	Pre	1	2	3	4	5	6	7	8	9	10	11	12	13	14	15	16	17	18	Final
Coaches'	—	—*	—	RV	RV	—	—	—	—	—	—	—	—	—	—	—	—	—	—	—
Baseball America	—	—	—	—	—	—	—	—	—	—	—	—	—	—	—	—	—	—	—	—
Collegiate Baseball^	—	—	—	—	—	—	—	—	—	—	—	—	—	—	—	—	—	—	—	—
NCBWA†	—	RV	RV	30	RV	RV	—	—	—	—	—	—	—	—	—	—	—	—	—	—

^ Collegiate Baseball ranked 40 teams in their preseason poll, but only ranked 30 teams weekly during the season.
† NCBWA ranks 30 teams in their preseason poll, but only ranks 25 teams weekly during the season.
* A new poll was not released for this week, so for comparison purposes, the previous week's ranking is inserted in this week's slot.
