= Red McEwen Field =

Baseball venue in Tampa, Florida

- The Red
- Interactive map of Red McEwen Field
- Former names: USF Baseball Field (1967–1977)
- Location: Tampa, FL
- Coordinates: 28.059391°N 82.404751°W
- Owner: University of South Florida
- Capacity: 2,500
- Surface: Natural grass
- Field size: Left field: 330 feet (100 m); Left-Center: 370 feet (110 m); Center field: 400 feet (120 m); Right-Center: 360 feet (110 m); Right field: 325 feet (99 m)

Construction
- Opened: 1967
- Renovated: 1977, 1982, 1997
- Closed: May 2010
- Demolished: June 2010

Tenants
- USF Bulls (NCAA) 1967–2010; Tampa Yankees (FSL) 1994–1995

Red McEwen Field (originally USF Baseball Field) was a baseball venue located on the campus of the University of South Florida in Tampa, Florida, United States. It opened in 1967 and had a capacity of 2,500 for most of its history. "The Red" was home to the South Florida Bulls baseball team from 1967 to 2010. Besides hosting USF baseball for over 40 years, Red McEwen Field was the temporary home of the Class-A minor league Tampa Yankees, who played their first two seasons there in 1994 and 1995 while their permanent home at Legends Field was under construction.

Red McEwan Field was demolished after the Bulls' 2010 baseball season and the new USF Baseball Stadium was built at the same location in time for their 2011 season.

== History ==
The University of South Florida did not compete in intercollegiate sports for several years after welcoming its first students in 1960, with first school president John S. Allen declaring that athletics were a distraction from learning. However, Allen agreed to the establishment of several sports programs for the 1966 school year, which necessitated the construction of athletic facilities.

The first Bulls baseball squad played their home games at Al Lopez Field in West Tampa while their on-campus ballpark was under construction, with a few games also played at Cuscaden Park in Ybor City. They hosted their first game at their new ballpark on March 4, 1967 with 8–6 loss to Rollins College. On March 18, 1967, the Bulls recorded their first win at the field, a 7–3 victory against St. Andrews College.

The ballpark was known as simply the "USF Baseball Field" until March 30, 1977, when it was renamed in honor of James "Red" McEwen, a civic leader who helped to establish the university as well as an early booster of the university's athletic programs. He was also the brother of iconic longtime Tampa Tribune sports editor Tom McEwen. A plaque honoring McEwen sat at the entrance to the stadium and was later moved to the entrance of the new USF Baseball Stadium after it was constructed to replace McEwen Field in 2011.

A decade after its 1967 construction, a lighting system donated by New York Yankees owner George Steinbrenner was installed, along with added seating that brought the stadium's capacity to 2,500. The field's first night game was played on February 25, 1977, a victory against the University of Tampa. New concessions and restrooms were built in 1982, and a press box followed in 1983. In 1997, a new lighting system was installed.

The New York Yankees Class-A Advanced affiliate Tampa Yankees called the stadium home for their 1994 and 1995 seasons. Future National Baseball Hall of Fame inductees Derek Jeter and Mariano Rivera played during portions of those seasons.

On March 26, 2010, Bulls pitcher Randy Fontanez threw a no-hitter at the field.

The Bulls played their final game at McEwen Field on May 16, 2010, losing to the UConn Huskies 10–3. Former USF players and coaches participated in a pregame ceremony honoring the field.

Following the 2010 season, Red McEwen Field was demolished and construction began on a new baseball stadium complex. The new facility, USF Baseball Stadium at Red McEwen Field, stands on the same site as McEwen Field, though its alignment was changed to accommodate a new concourse area shared with the (also new) USF Softball Stadium, with home plate in the current ballpark situated in the former right field of "Old Red".
