= 2015 American Athletic Conference baseball tournament =

American college baseball tournament

- Tournament Logo
- Teams: 8
- Format: Double-elimination tournament
- Finals site: Bright House Field; Clearwater, FL
- Champions: East Carolina (1st title)
- Winning coach: Cliff Godwin (1st title)
- MVP: Hunter Allen (East Carolina)
- Television: CBS Sports Network (Opening Round); ESPNU (Championship game)

2015 American Athletic Conference baseball standings
	Conf.						Overall
Team	W		L		T	PCT	W		L		T	PCT
Houston ‍†‍‍^{y}	16	–	8	–	0	.667	43	–	20	–	0	.683
East Carolina‡^{y} ‍‍‍	15	–	9	–	0	.625	40	–	22	–	0	.645
Tulane ‍‍‍^{y}	13	–	11	–	0	.542	35	–	25	–	0	.583
South Florida^{y} ‍‍‍	13	–	11	–	0	.542	34	–	26	–	1	.566
Memphis ‍‍‍	12	–	12	–	0	.500	37	–	21	–	0	.638
Connecticut ‍‍‍	11	–	13	–	0	.458	35	–	25	–	0	.583
UCF ‍‍‍	10	–	14	–	0	.417	31	–	27	–	0	.534
Cincinnati ‍‍‍	6	–	18	–	0	.250	15	–	41	–	0	.268
† – Conference champion ‡ – Tournament champion y – Invited to the NCAA tournament As of June 30, 2015; Rankings from Collegiate Baseball

The 2015 American Athletic Conference baseball tournament was held at Bright House Field in Clearwater, Florida, from May 19 through 24. The event, held at the end of the conference regular season, determined the champion of the American Athletic Conference for the 2015 season. East Carolina claimed their first tournament championship and earned the conference's automatic bid to the 2015 NCAA Division I baseball tournament.

== Format and seeding ==
All eight baseball teams in The American were seeded based on their records in conference play. The tournament used a two bracket double-elimination format, leading to a single championship game between the winners of each bracket.

Team	W	L	Pct.	GB	Seed	Tiebreaker
Houston	16	8	.667	–	1	
East Carolina	15	9	.625	1	2	
Tulane	13	11	.542	3	3	2–1 vs. South Florida
South Florida	13	11	.542	3	4	1–2 vs. Tulane
Memphis	12	12	.500	4	5	
Connecticut	11	13	.458	5	6	
UCF	10	14	.417	6	7	
Cincinnati	6	18	.250	10	8	

== Bracket ==
First round
1	Houston	8
8	Cincinnati	4
4	South Florida	10
5	Memphis	6
5	Memphis	14
8	Cincinnati	9
2	East Carolina	4
7	UCF	3
3	Tulane	3
6	Connecticut	1
7	UCF	3
6	Connecticut	4^{11}

Second round
1	Houston	7
4	South Florida	3
5	Memphis	4
4	South Florida	1
2	East Carolina	3
3	Tulane	1
6	Connecticut	7
3	Tulane	6

Semifinals
1	Houston	17	–
5	Memphis	3	–
2	East Carolina	4	–
6	Connecticut	2	–

Final
1	Houston	1
2	East Carolina	9

== All-Tournament Team ==
The following players were named to the All-Tournament Team.

Pos	Name	School
P	Joe Ingle	East Carolina
P	Andrew Lantrip	Houston
IF	Vinny Siena	Connecticut
IF	Hunter Allen	East Carolina
IF	Connor Wong	Houston
IF	Brandon Montgomery	Memphis
OF	Luke Lowery	East Carolina
OF	Corey Julks	Houston
OF	Darien Tubbs	Memphis
C	Ian Rice	Houston
UTY	Reid Love	East Carolina
DH	Joe DeRoche-Duffin	Connecticut

=== Most Outstanding Player ===
Hunter Allen was named Tournament Most Outstanding Player. Allen, a shortstop for East Carolina, was 9 for 18 over the course of the event, scoring 6 runs. He was 3 for 5 and scored 2 runs in the final game.
