= UC Baseball Stadium =

Baseball stadium in Cincinnati, Ohio, US

- Interactive map of UC Baseball Stadium
- Former names: UC Ballpark (2004–2006); Marge Schott Stadium (2006–2020)
- Location: 99 W. Corry St. Cincinnati, OH 45219
- Coordinates: 39.130102°N 84.513644°W
- Owner: University of Cincinnati
- Operator: University of Cincinnati
- Capacity: 3,085
- Surface: Motz Group's TriplePlayTM HP System
- Field size: Left Field: 325 ft (102 m); Left-Center: 370 ft Center Field: 400 ft (122 m); Right Center: 370 ft Right Field: 325 ft (102 m)

Construction
- Opened: May 20, 2004

Tenant
- Cincinnati Bearcats (NCAA) (2004–present)

UC Baseball Stadium (formerly UC Ballpark and Marge Schott Stadium) is a baseball stadium in Cincinnati, Ohio, on the campus of the University of Cincinnati. It is the home field of the Cincinnati Bearcats. The stadium holds 3,085 people and opened in 2004. The stadium was named after late Cincinnati Reds owner Marge Schott from 2006 to 2020, when her name was taken off due to renewed controversy over her racist remarks.

== Name ==
In 2006, the stadium was renamed to Marge Schott Stadium, after former Cincinnati Reds owner Marge Schott, two years after her Marge and Charles J. Schott Foundation donated $2 million to the university's athletic department for the Richard E. Lindner Varsity Village.

At one point, the university expressed interest in renaming the stadium to "Kevin Youkilis Field at Marge Schott Stadium", after former Bearcat and major leaguer Kevin Youkilis. However, Youkilis, who is Jewish, declined to be associated with Schott, who was known for racist and anti-Semitic statements. Youkilis recalled his father saying to him: "Kevin that is a tremendous honor that they would think of doing this. The only problem is that our family name will never coexist with that other individual. I will never let our family name be next to someone that was filled with such hatred of our Jewish community." In 2020, Bearcats pitcher Nathan Moore along with Youkilis called for the university to remove Schott's name from the stadium.

On June 23, 2020, the university's board of trustees voted unanimously to remove Schott's name from both the stadium and a space in the university's archives library, effective immediately.

== Facilities ==
The stadium holds 3,085 people and opened in 2004.

In August 2014, TriplePlay HP System turf was installed, replacing the original field turf. All areas of the field, including the warning track, home plate, pitcher's mound, and bullpens are now turf. In 2012, college baseball writer Eric Sorenson ranked the stadium as the third most underrated venue in Division I baseball.

== Attendance ==
=== Largest baseball attendance (since 2000) ===
Rank	Date	Attendance	Result	Notes
1	May 11, 2022	3,125	Cincinnati 12 – Northern Kentucky 6	
2	March 1, 2023	2,513	Cincinnati 12 – Miami (OH) 15	
3	March 2, 2022	2,451	Cincinnati 5 – Ohio State 4	
4	May 15, 2018	2,363	Cincinnati 14 – Ohio State 4	
5	May 20, 2004	2,200	Cincinnati 3 – UAB 14	
6	March 5, 2022	2,042	Cincinnati 4 – Northwestern 2	

== See also ==
- List of NCAA Division I baseball venues
