= USF Baseball Stadium =

Baseball stadium in Florida, United States

- "The Red"
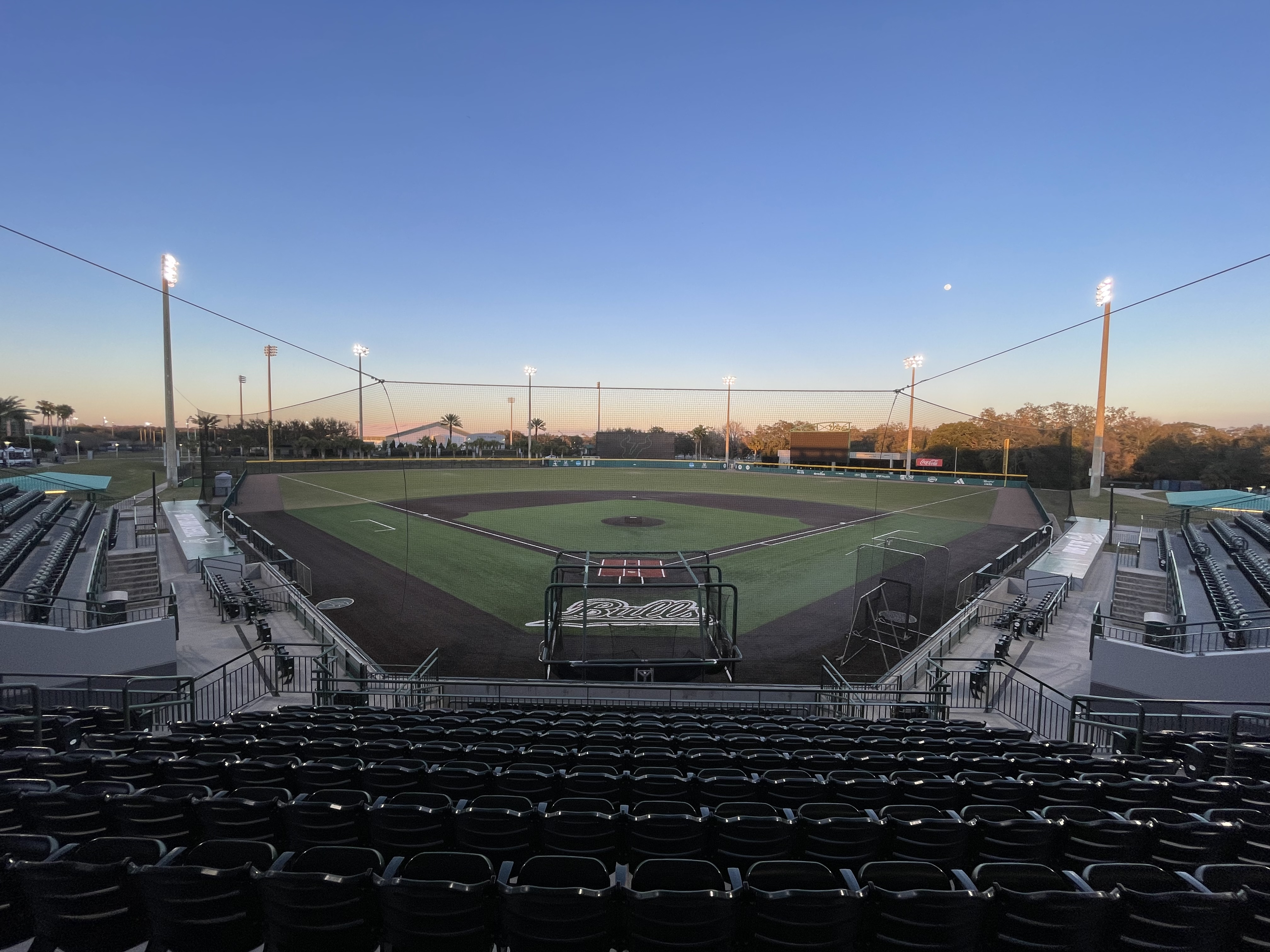
- USF Baseball Stadium in February 2024
- Interactive map of USF Baseball Stadium
- Full name: USF Baseball Stadium at Red McEwen Field
- Address: 11899 Bull Run Drive; Tampa, Florida, United States
- Coordinates: 28.05866°N 82.404649°W
- Owner: University of South Florida
- Operator: University of South Florida
- Capacity: 3,211 (1,500 seated)
- Surface: Natural grass
- Scoreboard: Daktronics
- Record attendance: 3,211
- Field size: Left Field: 325 ft (99 m); Left Center: 367 ft (112 m); Center Field: 400 ft (120 m); Right Center: 370 ft (110 m); Right Field: 330 ft (100 m)

Construction
- Groundbreaking: 2010
- Opened: February 25, 2011
- Architect: Populous
- General contractor: R.R. Simmons

Tenant
- USF Bulls (NCAA) 2011–present

USF Baseball Stadium at Red McEwen Field is a baseball stadium located in Tampa, Florida, United States. It is home to the University of South Florida Bulls baseball team of the Division I American Athletic Conference. The facility has a capacity of 3,211 spectators. Opening in 2011, it replaced Red McEwen Field as the home of USF's baseball team.

Features of the ballpark include a 1,500-seat grandstand with canopy, a berm which can accommodate over 1,700 additional spectators along each foul line and in left field, in-ground dugouts, fan pavilions, press box, batting cages, a large Daktronics scoreboard, party pavilions in left and right field, and the Donaldson Deck, a party deck where fans can view both the baseball field and adjacent USF Softball Stadium field at the same time.

== History ==
After the demolition of Red McEwen Field following the 2010 season, construction of a new facility on the same location began. The alignment of the new field was changed, with home plate moving from the northwest corner to the southwest corner, to accommodate a concourse shared with the newly constructed neighboring USF Softball Stadium and create the USF Baseball/Softball Complex. The physical field is still named after McEwen, as can be seen on the backstop behind home plate, but the stadium is called USF Baseball Stadium.

Like its predecessor, the field is named after James "Red" McEwen, a local civic leader who helped to establish the university as well as an early booster of the university's athletic programs. He was also the brother of iconic longtime Tampa Tribune sportswriter Tom McEwen. A plaque honoring McEwen sits near the stadium's main entrance.

The new baseball/softball complex was designed by Populous. Construction began shortly after the end of the 2010 season, with the stadium hosting its first game on February 25, 2011. The first game at the ballpark set a new attendance record for USF baseball with 3,126 fans (the old field had a capacity of 2,500). Later that season, the Bulls set a new program attendance record again with a sellout crowd of 3,211 fans in a loss to No. 1 Florida.

In 2011, the first year of the stadium's opening, the Bulls ranked 29th in Division I college baseball in attendance. The team regularly finishes in the top 30 in the nation for annual attendance.

In 2012, college baseball writer Eric Sorenson ranked the stadium as the fifth most underrated venue in Division I baseball.

During a game against Army on March 16, 2017, Bulls pitchers Shane McClanahan and Carson Ragsdale combined to throw the first (and only as of the end of the 2022 season) no-hitter in the stadium's history.

As of the end of the 2021 season, the Bulls have a 239–128–1 record at the stadium

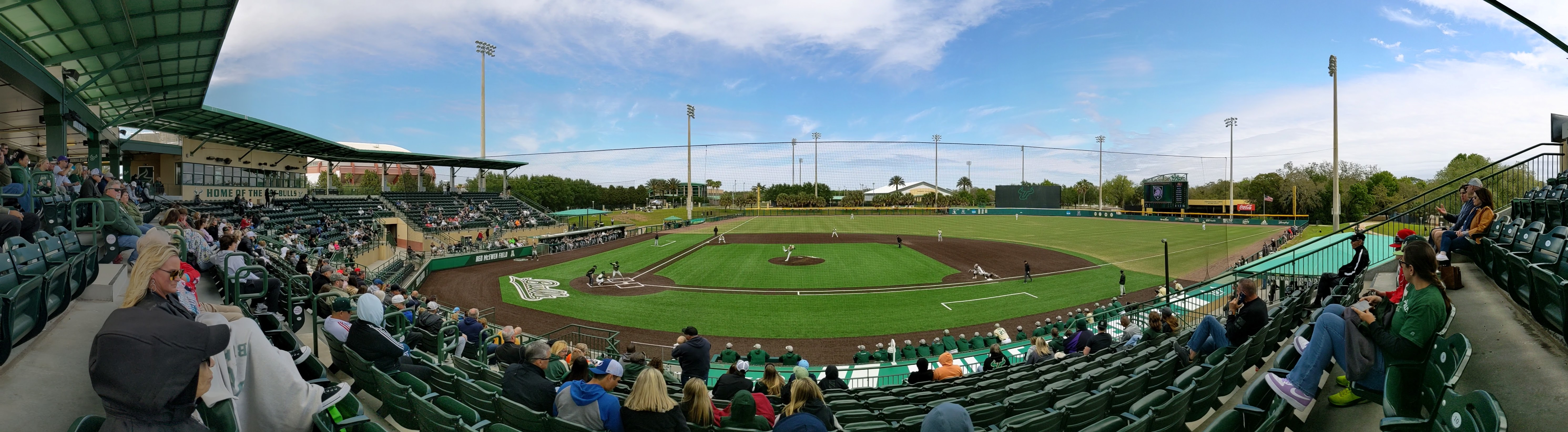
Panorama from the 1st base side

== See also ==
- List of NCAA Division I baseball venues
