= FedExPark =

Baseball stadium in Memphis, Tennessee, US

FedExPark Avron Fogelman Field
- Interactive map of FedExPark Avron Fogelman Field
- Former names: Nat Buring Stadium (1972–2009)
- Location: Memphis, Tennessee
- Coordinates: 35.102074°N 89.925819°W
- Owner: University of Memphis
- Operator: University of Memphis
- Capacity: 2,000
- Surface: Natural grass
- Field size: Left Field – 318 feet (97 m); Left Center Field – 360 feet (110 m); Center Field – 380 feet (116 m); Right Center Field – 360 feet (110 m); Right Field – 317 feet (97 m)
- Public transit: MATA

Construction
- Opened: 1972
- Renovated: 2009

Tenant
- Memphis Tigers baseball

FedExPark Avron Fogelman Field is a baseball stadium in Memphis, Tennessee. It is the home field of the Memphis Tigers baseball team. The stadium holds 2,000 spectators and opened in 1972 as Nat Buring Stadium.

The stadium was renovated and expanded in 2009, at a cost of $3 million; the Tigers played the 2009 season at USA Stadium in Millington. The stadium was reopened on February 19, 2010, as FedExPark.

== See also ==
- List of NCAA Division I baseball venues
