= 2010 Arizona State Sun Devils baseball team =

American college baseball season

2010 Arizona State Sun Devils baseball

Tempe Super Regional champions Tempe Regional champions Pac-10 champions

College World Series, 0–2
- Conference: Pac-10 Conference

Ranking
- Coaches: No. 7
- CB: No. 7
- Record: 52–10 (20–7 Pac-10)
- Head coach: Tim Esmay (1st year)
- Home stadium: Packard Stadium

2010 Pacific-10 Conference baseball standings
	Conf.				Overall
Team	W		L	PCT	W		L	PCT
No. 7 Arizona State ‍†‍‍^{y}	20	–	7	.741	52	–	10	.839
No. 2 UCLA ‍‍‍^{y}	18	–	9	.667	51	–	16	.761
Washington State ‍‍‍^{y}	15	–	12	.556	37	–	22	.627
Stanford ‍‍‍^{y}	14	–	13	.519	31	–	25	.554
Oregon ‍‍‍^{y}	13	–	14	.481	40	–	24	.625
California ‍‍‍^{y}	13	–	14	.481	29	–	25	.537
Arizona ‍‍‍^{y}	12	–	15	.444	34	–	24	.586
Oregon State ‍‍‍^{y}	12	–	15	.444	32	–	24	.571
Washington ‍‍‍	11	–	16	.407	28	–	28	.500
USC ‍‍‍	7	–	20	.259	28	–	32	.467
‡ – Pac-10 Conference champion y – Invited to the 2010 NCAA Division I baseball tournament As of December 16, 2010; Rankings from Coaches' Poll

The 2010 Arizona State Sun Devils baseball team represented Arizona State University in the 2010 NCAA Division I baseball season. The Sun Devils played their home games at Packard Stadium. The team was coached by Tim Esmay in his 1st season at Arizona State.

The Sun Devils reached the College World Series, entering as the top seed but were eliminated by eventual champion South Carolina in the first elimination round.

== Roster ==
2010 Arizona State Sun Devils roster
Pitchers: 3 – Jordan Swagerty – Sophomore; 20 – Brady Rodgers – Freshman; 32 – Josh Moody – Junior; 34 – Seth Blair – Junior; 35 – Merrill Kelly – Junior; 36 – Jeeter Ishida – Sophomore; 40 – Mitchell Lambson – Sophomore; 45 – Josh Spence – Senior; 47 – Alex Blackford – Freshman; 51 – Jake Borup – Sophomore; 99 – Jake Barrett – Freshman	Infielders: 2 – Zack Macphee – Sophomore; 8 – Tyler Bernard – Freshman; 17 – Deven Marrero – Freshman; 18 – Joey Demichele – Freshman; 25 – Zach Wilson – Sophomore; 29 – Raoul Torrez – Senior; 30 – Riccio Torrez – Sophomore; 37 – Drew Maggi – Sophomore; 55 – Danny Duffy – Senior	Outfielders: 11 – Matt Newman – Junior; 15 – Brandon Magee – Sophomore; 22 – Andrew Aplin – Freshman; 23 – Johnny Ruettiger – Sophomore; 26 – Jimmy Patterson – Junior; 46 – Andy Workman – Junior; 49 – Kole Calhoun – Senior; Catchers: 13 – Austin Barnes – Sophomore; 14 – Xorge Carrillo – Junior; 28 – Kyle Arnsberg – Freshman; 38 – Beau Maggi – Freshman; 48 – Daniel Milner- Junior

== Schedule ==
2010 Arizona State Sun Devils baseball game log
Regular season

February
Date	Opponent	Rank	Site/stadium	Score	Win	Loss	Save	Attendance	Overall record	Pac-10 record
Feb 19	Northern Illinois*	#5	Packard Stadium • Tempe, AZ	W 8–0	Blair (1–0)	Lukanen (0–1)	None	3,011	1–0	
Feb 20	Northern Illinois*	#5	Packard Stadium • Tempe, AZ	W 10–5	Kelly (1–0)	Hermsen (0–1)	Rodgers (1)		2–0	
Feb 20	Northern Illinois*	#5	Packard Stadium • Tempe, AZ	W 26–1	Borup (1–0)	Smith (0–1)	None	2,548	3–0	
Feb 26	Towson*	#2	Packard Stadium • Tempe, AZ	W 15–1	Blair (2–0)	Curd (0–2)	None	2,630	4–0	
Feb 27	Towson*	#2	Packard Stadium • Tempe, AZ	W 9–1	Borup (2–0)	Austin (1–1)	Lambson (1)		5–0	
Feb 27	Towson*	#2	Packard Stadium • Tempe, AZ	W 11–6	Rodgers (1–0)	Schmeer (0–1)	None	3,196	6–0	
Feb 28	Towson*	#2	Packard Stadium • Tempe, AZ	W 5–4	Kelly (2–0)	Patton (0–1)	Swagerty (1)	1,931	7–0	

March
Date	Opponent	Rank	Site/stadium	Score	Win	Loss	Save	Attendance	Overall record	Pac-10 record
Mar 4	vs Cal Poly*	#2	Surprise Stadium • Surprise, AZ (Coca-Cola Classic)	W 12–9	Lambson (1–0)	Leonard (0–2)	None	1,651	8–0	
Mar 5	vs #10 Oregon State*	#2	Surprise Stadium • Surprise, AZ (Coca-Cola Classic)	W 6–4	Kelly (3–0)	Waldron (1–1)	Swagerty (2–0)	2,346	9–0	
Mar 6	vs UC Riverside*	#2	Surprise Stadium • Surprise, AZ (Coca-Cola Classic)	W 16–2	Patterson (1–0)	Larkins (1–2)	Blackford (1)	2,232,	10–0	
Mar 7	vs FIU*	#2	Surprise Stadium • Surprise, AZ (Coca-Cola Classic)	W 4–1	Borup (3–0)	Arboleya (1–1)	Lambson (2)	856	11–0	
Mar 9	Grand Canyon*	#2	Packard Stadium • Tempe, AZ	W 4–2	Moody (1–0)	McKee (0–3)	Swagerty (3)	3,380	12–0	
Mar 12	Auburn*	#2	Packard Stadium • Tempe, AZ	W 9–8	Barrett (1–0)	Ray (0–1)	Swagerty (4)	3,121	13–0	
Mar 13	Auburn*	#2	Packard Stadium • Tempe, AZ	W 16–7	Kelly (4–0)	Hendrix (1–1)	Lambson (3)	3,920	14–0	
Mar 14	Auburn*	#2	Packard Stadium • Tempe, AZ	W 8–3	Borup (4–0)	Jacobs (0–2)	None	3,469	15–0	
Mar 16	at Cal State Fullerton*	#1	Goodwin Field • Fullerton, CA	W 6–5	Lambson (2–0)	Ramirez (0–2)	Swagerty (5)	1,648	16–0	
Mar 17	at Cal State Fullerton*	#1	Goodwin Field • Fullerton, CA	W 8–6	Barrett (2–0)	Mertins (1–1)	Swagerty (6)	1,749	17–0	
Mar 19	Houston*	#1	Packard Stadium • Tempe, AZ	W 10–1	Blair (3–0)	Kankel (0–1)	None	4,275	18–0	
Mar 20	Houston*	#1	Packard Stadium • Tempe, AZ	W 6–0	Kelly (5–0)	Goodnight (3–2)	None	3,820	19–0	
Mar 21	Houston*	#1	Packard Stadium • Tempe, AZ	W 6–5	Borup (5–0)	Creel (2–1)	Swagerty (7)	3,429	20–0	
Mar 26	California	#1	Packard Stadium • Tempe, AZ	W 12–5	Blair (4–0)	Johnson (3–1)	None	4,371	21–0	1–0
Mar 27	California	#1	Packard Stadium • Tempe, AZ	W 6–1	Kelly (6–0)	Jones (4–2)	None	4,371	22–0	2–0
Mar 28	California	#1	Packard Stadium • Tempe, AZ	W 3–2	Swagerty (1–0)	Diemer (0–1)	None	4,371	23–0	3–0

April
Date	Opponent	Rank	Site/stadium	Score	Win	Loss	Save	Attendance	Overall record	Pac-10 record
Apr 1	at Oregon	#1	PK Park • Eugene, OR	W 1–0	Blair (5–0)	Anderson (4–3)	Swagerty (8)	2,114	24–0	4–0
Apr 2	at Oregon	#1	PK Park • Eugene, OR	L 5–6	Thornton (4–0)	Rodgers (1–1)	None	1,795	24–1	4–1
Apr 3	at Oregon	#1	PK Park • Eugene, OR	W 7–3	Borup (6–0)	Keudell (4–2)	Barrett (1)	2,157	25–1	5–1
Apr 5	San Diego*	#1	Packard Stadium • Tempe, AZ	W 15–0	Rodgers (2–1)	Blair (2–3)	None	2,967	26–1	
Apr 6	San Diego*	#1	Packard Stadium • Tempe, AZ	W 11–6	Lambson (3–0)	Hauser (2–1)	None	3,095	27–1	
Apr 9	at Washington State	#1	Bailey–Brayton Field • Pullman, WA	L 5–6	Conley (3–1)	Lambson (3–1)	None	712	27–2	5–2
Apr 10	at Washington State	#1	Bailey–Brayton Field • Pullman, WA	W 11–7	Kelly (7–0)	Cook (0–2)	Barrett (2)	3,693	28–2	6–2
Apr 11	at Washington State	#1	Bailey–Brayton Field • Pullman, WA	L 5–9	Lambert (2–1)	Borup (6–1)	Conley (6)	789	28–3	6–3
Apr 16	Southern California	#1	Packard Stadium • Tempe, AZ	W 5–4	Blair (6–0)	Triggs (1–6)	Swagerty (9)	4,279	29–3	7–3
Apr 17	Southern California	#1	Packard Stadium • Tempe, AZ	W 5–3	Kelly (8–0)	Mount (3–3)	Swagerty (10)	4,371	30–3	8–3
Apr 18	Southern California	#1	Packard Stadium • Tempe, AZ	W 14–6	Borup (7–1)	Smith (2–5)	None	3,489	31–3	9–3
Apr 20	#18 Arizona*	#1	Packard Stadium • Tempe, AZ	L 2–4	Workman (2–0)	Rodgers (2–2)	Cunningham (2)	3,566	31–4	
Apr 23	Washington	#1	Packard Stadium • Tempe, AZ	W 10–2	Blair (7–0)	Snow (3–1)	None	2,697	32–4	10–3
Apr 24	Washington	#1	Packard Stadium • Tempe, AZ	L 4–9	Cimber (4–2)	Lambson (3–2)	Clem (4)	4,209	32–5	10–4
Apr 25	Washington	#1	Packard Stadium • Tempe, AZ	W 10–4	Borup (8–1)	Brown (1–3)	None	2,494	33–5	11–4
Apr 27	San Francisco*	#2	Packard Stadium • Tempe, AZ	W 11–5	Lambson (4–2)	Luippold (1–2)	None	3,040	34–5	
Apr 28	San Francisco*	#2	Packard Stadium • Tempe, AZ	W 21–3	Moody (2–0)	Remer (1–2)	Rodgers (2)	3,248	35–5	
Apr 30	at #9 UCLA	#2	Jackie Robinson Stadium • Los Angeles, CA	W 5–1	Lambson (5–2)	Cole (6–2)	None	1,436	36–5	12–4

May
Date	Opponent	Rank	Site/stadium	Score	Win	Loss	Save	Attendance	Overall record	Pac-10 record
May 1	at #9 UCLA	#2	Jackie Robinson Stadium • Los Angeles, CA	W 6–1	Kelly (9–0)	Bauer (6–3)	Rodgers (3)	1,725	37–5	13–4
May 2	at #9 UCLA	#2	Jackie Robinson Stadium • Los Angeles, CA	W 12–3	Borup (9–1)	Rasmussen (6–2)	None	1,921	38–5	14–4
May 4	#26 Arizona*	#2	Packard Stadium • Tempe, AZ	W 13–1	Rodgers (3–2)	Cunningham (2–2)	None	4,033	39–5	15–4
May 10	BYU*	#2	Packard Stadium • Tempe, AZ	W 14–0	Blair (8–0)	Nyberg (0–4)	None	2,641	40–5	
May 11	BYU*	#2	Packard Stadium • Tempe, AZ	W 7–2	Borup (10–1)	Hardesty (1–4)	None	3,109	41–5	
May 15	at Arizona	#2	Hi Corbett Field • Tucson, AZ	W 12–4	Blair (9–0)	Heyer (6–2)	None	3,012	42–5	15–4
May 16	at Arizona	#2	Hi Corbett Field • Tucson, AZ	L 4–12	Simon (8–4)	Kelly (9–1)	None	2,325	42–6	15–5
May 17	at Arizona	#3	Hi Corbett Field • Tucson, AZ	W 4–2	Lambson (6–2)	Workman (2–2)	Swagerty (11)	1,620	43–6	16–5
May 21	Oregon State	#3	Packard Stadium • Tempe, AZ	W 10–4	Blair (10–0)	Peavey (4–3)	None	3,003	44–6	17–5
May 22	Oregon State	#3	Packard Stadium • Tempe, AZ	W 6–5	Lambson (7–2)	Rhoderick (2–2)	Swagerty (12)	4,123	45–6	18–5
May 23	Oregon State	#3	Packard Stadium • Tempe, AZ	L 8–9	Waldron (4–4)	Rodgers (3–3)	Sitton (3)	2,914	45–7	18–6
May 27	at #25 Stanford	#3	Klein Field at Sunken Diamond • Stanford, CA	W 4–2	Blair (11–0)	Mooneyham (3–6)	Swagerty (13)	1,360	46–7	19–6
May 28	at #25 Stanford	#3	Klein Field at Sunken Diamond • Stanford, CA	L 2–5	Pries (4–3)	Kelly (9–2)	None	1,960	46–8	19–7
May 29	at #25 Stanford	#3	Klein Field at Sunken Diamond • Stanford, CA	W 8–6	Rodgers (4–3)	Sandbrink (2–2)	Swagerty (14)	2,815	47–8	20–7

Post-season

NCAA Tempe Regional
Date	Opponent	Rank	Site/stadium	Score	Win	Loss	Save	Attendance	Overall record	NCAAT record
June 4	(4) Milwaukee	#1 (1)	Packard Stadium • Tempe, AZ	W 6–2	Kelly (10–2)	Pierce (7–5)	None	4,371	48–8	1–0
June 5	(3) Hawaii	#1 (1)	Packard Stadium • Tempe, AZ	W 12–1	Blair (12–0)	Slaats (5–4)	None	4,371	49–8	2–0
June 6	(3) Hawaii	#1 (1)	Packard Stadium • Tempe, AZ	W 8–4	Borup (11–1)	Little (2–3)	None	3,123	50–8	3–0

NCAA Super Regional
Date	Opponent	Rank	Site/stadium	Score	Win	Loss	Save	Attendance	Overall record	NCAAT record
June 12	#15 Arkansas	#1 (1)	Packard Stadium • Tempe, AZ	W 7–6	Lambson (8–2)	Eibner (3–5)	None	4,371	51–8	4–0
June 13	#15 Arkansas	#1 (1)	Packard Stadium • Tempe, AZ	W 7–5	Swagerty (2–0)	Forrest (8–1)	None	4,371	52–8	5–0

College World Series
Date	Opponent	Rank	Site/stadium	Score	Win	Loss	Save	Attendance	Overall record	CWS record
June 21	vs #8 Clemson	#1 (1)	Johnny Rosenblatt Stadium • Omaha, NE	L 3–6	Harman (8–3)	Blair (12–1)	Frederick (3)	14,198	52–9	0–1
June 22	vs #5 South Carolina	#1 (1)	Johnny Rosenblatt Stadium • Omaha, NE	L 4–11	Dyson (6–5)	Kelly (10–3)	None	19,936	52–10	0–2

== Ranking movements ==
Ranking movements Legend: ██ Increase in ranking ██ Decrease in ranking
	Week																		
Poll	Pre	1	2	3	4	5	6	7	8	9	10	11	12	13	14	15	16	17	Final
Coaches'	8	8*	4	3	1	1	1	1	1	1	2	2	2	3	2	1	1	1	1
Baseball America	14	14	12	11	10	3	2	1	3	1	3	3	3	3	3	2	2	2	4
Collegiate Baseball^	5	2	2	2	1	1	1	1	1	1	2	2	2	3	3	1	1	1	7
NCBWA†	8	6	4	3	2	2	1	2	2	1	3	3	3	3	3	2	1	1	7

^ Collegiate Baseball ranked 40 teams in their preseason poll, but only ranked 30 teams weekly during the season.
† NCBWA ranks 30 teams in their preseason poll, but only ranks 25 teams weekly during the season.
* A new poll was not released for this week, so for comparison purposes, the previous week's ranking is inserted in this week's slot.
