= 2010 NCAA Division I baseball tournament =

American college sports championship

- Season: 2010
- Teams: 64
- Finals site: Johnny Rosenblatt Stadium; Omaha, Nebraska
- Champions: South Carolina (1st title)
- Runner-up: UCLA (3rd CWS Appearance)
- Winning coach: Ray Tanner (1st title)
- MOP: Jackie Bradley Jr. (South Carolina)

The 2010 NCAA Division I baseball tournament began on Friday, June 4, 2010, as part of the 2010 NCAA Division I baseball season. The 64-team double elimination tournament concluded with the 2010 College World Series in Omaha, Nebraska. This was the final year at Johnny Rosenblatt Stadium, the host venue since 1950.

The South Carolina Gamecocks won two elimination games against archrival Clemson in the College World Series semifinals, then defeated the UCLA Bruins in the second game of the finals on a walk-off single by Whit Merrifield to win the national championship. It was the school's first championship in baseball and second team championship overall.

== Bids ==
=== Automatic bids ===
Conference champions from 30 Division I conferences earned automatic bids to regionals. The remaining 34 spots were awarded to schools as at-large invitees.

School	Conference	Record (Conf)	Berth	Last NCAA appearance
Stony Brook	America East	29–25 (15–9)	Won America East Tourney	2008 (Tempe Regional)
Saint Louis	Atlantic 10	33–27 (15–12)	Won Atlantic 10 Tourney	2006 (Fullerton Regional)
Florida State	ACC	42–17 (18–12)	Won ACC Tourney	2009 (Tallahassee Super Regional)
Mercer	Atlantic Sun	37–22 (16–11)	Won A-Sun Tourney	First NCAA Appearance
Texas A&M	Big 12	40–19 (14–12)	Won Big 12 Tourney	2009 (Fort Worth Regional)
St. John's	Big East	40–18 (16–11)	Won Big East Tourney	2008 (Houston Regional)
Coastal Carolina	Big South	51–7 (25–0)	Won Big South Tourney	2009 (Chapel Hill Regional)
Minnesota	Big Ten	30–28 (15–9)	Won Big Ten Tourney	2009 (Baton Rouge Regional)
Cal State Fullerton	Big West	41–15 (21–3)	Regular-season champion	2009 (College World Series)
VCU	Colonial	34–24–1 (16–7–1)	Won CAA Tourney	2007 (Myrtle Beach Regional)
Southern Miss	Conference USA	35–22 (14–10)	Won Conference USA Tourney	2009 (College World Series)
Milwaukee	Horizon	33–24 (17–8)	Won Horizon Tourney	2002 (Lincoln Regional)
Dartmouth	Ivy	26–17 (13–7)	Won Ivy championship series	2009 (Chapel Hill Regional)
Rider	MAAC	36–21 (15–9)	Won MAAC Tourney	2009 (Fullerton Regional)
Kent State	MAC	39–23 (18–9)	Won MAC Tourney	2009 (Tempe Regional)
Bethune–Cookman	MEAC	35–20 (18–0)	Won MEAC Tourney	2009 (Gainesville Regional)
Illinois State	Missouri Valley	31–22 (15–6)	Won MVC Tourney	1994 (Midwest I Regional)
TCU	Mountain West	46–11 (19–5)	Won MWC Tourney	2009 (Austin Super Regional)
Central Connecticut	Northeast	33–21 (18–14)	Won NEC Tourney	2004 (Oklahoma City Regional)
Jacksonville State	Ohio Valley	32–24 (15–8)	Won OVC Tourney	2006 (Tuscaloosa Regional)
Arizona State	Pac-10	47–8 (20–7)	Regular-season champion	2009 (College World Series)
Bucknell	Patriot	25–33 (8–12)	Won Patriot Tourney	2008 (Tallahassee Regional)
LSU	SEC	40–20 (14–16)	Won SEC Tourney	2009 (NCAA Champions)
The Citadel	Southern	42–20 (24–6)	Won Southern Tourney	2004 (Columbia, S.C. Regional)
Lamar	Southland	35–24 (16–17)	Won Southland Tourney	2004 (Houston Regional)
Grambling State	SWAC	22–30 (11–14)	Won SWAC Tourney	1985 (Central Regional)
Oral Roberts	Summit	35–25 (19–9)	Won Summit Tourney	2009 (Tallahassee Super Regional)
FIU	Sun Belt	36–23 (17–13)	Won Sun Belt Tourney	2002 (Gainesville Regional)
San Diego	West Coast	36–20 (19–2)	Regular-season champion	2008 (Long Beach Regional)
Hawaii	WAC	33–26 (12–12)	Won WAC Tourney	2006 (Corvallis Regional)

=== Bids by conference ===
Conference	Total	Schools
Atlantic Coast	8	Clemson, Florida State, Georgia Tech, Miami (FL), North Carolina, NC State, Virginia, Virginia Tech
Atlantic Sun	1	Mercer
Atlantic 10	1	Saint Louis
America East	1	Stony Brook
Big Ten	1	Minnesota
Big 12	5	Baylor, Kansas State, Oklahoma, Texas, Texas A&M
Big East	3	Connecticut, Louisville, St. John's
Big South	1	Coastal Carolina
Big West	2	UC Irvine, Cal State Fullerton
Colonial	1	VCU
Conference USA	2	Rice, Southern Miss
Horizon	1	Milwaukee
Ivy	1	Dartmouth
Metro Atlantic	1	Rider
Mid-American	1	Kent State
Mid-Eastern	1	Bethune–Cookman
Missouri Valley	1	Illinois State
Mountain West	2	New Mexico, TCU
Northeast	1	Central Connecticut
Ohio Valley	1	Jacksonville State
Pacific-10	8	Arizona, Arizona State, California, Oregon, Oregon State, Stanford, UCLA, Washington State
Patriot	1	Bucknell
Southern	3	College of Charleston, The Citadel, Elon
Southeastern	8	Alabama, Arkansas, Auburn, Florida, LSU, Mississippi, South Carolina, Vanderbilt
Southland	1	Lamar
Southwestern	1	Grambling State
Summit	1	Oral Roberts
Sun Belt	3	Florida Atlantic, FIU, Louisiana–Lafayette
Western Athletic	1	Hawaii
WCC	1	San Diego

== National seeds ==
Bold indicates CWS participant.

1. **Arizona State**
2. Texas
3. **Florida**
4. Coastal Carolina
5. Virginia
6. **UCLA**
7. Louisville
8. Georgia Tech

== Regionals and super regionals ==
Bold indicates winner. * indicates extra innings.

=== Tempe Super Regional ===
Regional	Regional
1	**Arizona State**	**6**
4	Milwaukee	2
1	**Arizona State**	**12**
3	Hawaii	1
3	**Hawaii**	**4**
2	San Diego	3
Tempe Regional – Packard Stadium
4	Milwaukee	1
2	**San Diego**	**22**
2	San Diego	9
3	**Hawaii**	**12**
1	**Arkansas**	**19**
4	Grambling State	7
1	**Arkansas**	**6**
2	Washington State	4
3	Kansas State	6
2	**Washington State**	**8**
Fayetteville Regional – Baum Stadium
4	Grambling State	8
3	**Kansas State**	**9**
3	Kansas State	6
2	**Washington State**	**9**

Regional finals
1	**Arizona State**	**8**	—
3	Hawaii	4	—
1	**Arkansas**	7	**7**
2	Washington State	**10**	2

Super regionals
1	**Arizona State**	**7**^{12}	**7**^{12}	—
Arkansas	6	5	—

=== Clemson Super Regional ===
Hosted by Clemson at Doug Kingsmore Stadium

Regional	Regional
1	**Auburn**	**9**
4	Jacksonville State	7
1	Auburn	2
2	**Clemson**	**5**
3	Southern Miss	1
2	**Clemson**	**10**
Auburn Regional – Plainsman Park
4	Jacksonville State	6
3	**Southern Miss**	**19**
3	Southern Miss	8
1	**Auburn**	**17**
1	**Georgia Tech**	**10**
4	Mercer	0
1	**Georgia Tech**	**5**
2	Alabama	2
3	Elon	2
2	**Alabama**	**11**
Atlanta Regional – Russ Chandler Stadium
4	**Mercer**	**13**
3	Elon	7
4	Mercer	3
2	**Alabama**	**5**

Regional finals
2	**Clemson**	10	**13**
1	Auburn	**11**	7
1	Georgia Tech	1	8
2	**Alabama**	**8**	**10**

Super regionals
**Clemson**	4	**19**	**8**
Alabama	**5**	5	6

=== Charlottesville Super Regional ===
Regional	Regional
1	**Virginia**	**15**
4	VCU	4
1	**Virginia**	**13**
2	Ole Miss	7
3	St. John's	5
2	**Ole Miss**	**10**
Charlottesville Regional – Davenport Field
4	VCU	6
3	**St. John's**	**8**
3	**St. John's**	**20**
2	Ole Miss	16
1	**Oklahoma**	**7**^{10}
4	Oral Roberts	6
1	**Oklahoma**	**7**^{10}
3	North Carolina	6
3	**North Carolina**	**12**
2	California	3
Norman Regional – L. Dale Mitchell Baseball Park
4	**Oral Roberts**	**9**
2	California	8
4	Oral Roberts	4
3	**North Carolina**	**12**

Regional finals
1	**Virginia**	5	**5**
3	St. John's	**6**	3
1	**Oklahoma**	**3**	—
3	North Carolina	2	—

Super regionals
5	Virginia	**3**	7	0
**Oklahoma**	2	**10**	**11**

=== Myrtle Beach Super Regional ===
NOTE: Because Vrooman Field at Charles Watson Stadium was inadequate for NCAA postseason play, Coastal Carolina-hosted games were played at BB&T Coastal Field.

Regional	Regional
1	**South Carolina**	**9**
4	Bucknell	5
1	**South Carolina**	**9**
3	The Citadel	4
3	**The Citadel**	**7**
2	Virginia Tech	2
Columbia Regional – Carolina Stadium
4	Bucknell	7
2	**Virginia Tech**	**16**
2	**Virginia Tech**	**4**
3	The Citadel	3
1	**Coastal Carolina**	**6**
4	Stony Brook	0
1	Coastal Carolina	6
2	**College of Charleston**	**16**
3	NC State	6
2	**College of Charleston**	**9**
Myrtle Beach Regional – BB&T Coastal Field
4	**Stony Brook**	**6**
3	NC State	2
4	Stony Brook	7
1	**Coastal Carolina**	**25**

Regional finals
1	**South Carolina**	**10**	—
2	Virginia Tech	2	—
2	College of Charleston	7	10
1	**Coastal Carolina**	**8**	**11**^{10}

Super regionals
**South Carolina**	**4**	**10**	—
4	Coastal Carolina	3	9	—

=== Austin Super Regional ===
Regional	Regional
1	**Texas**	**11**
4	Rider	0
1	**Texas**	**4**
3	Louisiana–Lafayette	2
3	**Louisiana–Lafayette**	**1**
2	Rice	0
Austin Regional – UFCU Disch–Falk Field
4	Rider	1
2	**Rice**	**19**
2	**Rice**	**9**
3	Louisiana–Lafayette	1
1	**TCU**	**16**
4	Lamar	3
1	**TCU**	**11**
3	Arizona	5
3	**Arizona**	**10**
2	Baylor	9
Fort Worth Regional – Lupton Stadium
4	Lamar	4
2	**Baylor**	**6**
2	**Baylor**	**4**
3	Arizona	2

Regional finals
1	**Texas**	**4**	—
2	Rice	1	—
1	**TCU**	**9**	—
2	Baylor	0	—

Super regionals
2	Texas	1	**14**	1
**TCU**	**3**	1	**4**

=== Tallahassee Super Regional ===
Hosted by Florida State at Dick Howser Stadium

Regional	Regional
1	**Florida State**	**11**
4	Central Connecticut	3
1	**Florida State**	**6**
3	Oregon	4
3	**Oregon**	**5**
2	Connecticut	3
Norwich Regional – Dodd Memorial Stadium
4	Central Connecticut	5
2	**Connecticut**	**25**
2	Connecticut	3
3	**Oregon**	**4**
1	**Louisville**	**11**
4	Saint Louis	2
1	**Louisville**	**7**
2	Vanderbilt	1
3	Illinois State	7
2	**Vanderbilt**	**8**^{13}
Louisville Regional – Jim Patterson Stadium
4	Saint Louis	3
3	**Illinois State**	**8**
3	Illinois State	4
2	**Vanderbilt**	**10**

Regional finals
1	**Florida State**	**5**	—
3	Oregon	3	—
1	Louisville	0	2
2	**Vanderbilt**	**7**	**3**^{10}

Super regionals
**Florida State**	**9**	2	**7**
Vanderbilt	8	**6**	6

=== Los Angeles Super Regional ===
Regional	Regional
1	**UCLA**	**15**
4	Kent State	1
1	**UCLA**	**6**
2	LSU	3
3	UC Irvine	10
2	**LSU**	**11**^{11}
Los Angeles Regional – Jackie Robinson Stadium
4	Kent State	9
3	**UC Irvine**	**19**
3	**UC Irvine**	**4**
2	LSU	3
1	Cal State Fullerton	1
4	**Minnesota**	**3**
4	**Minnesota**	**6**^{10}
3	New Mexico	4
3	**New Mexico**	**9**
2	Stanford	5
Fullerton Regional – Goodwin Field
1	**Cal State Fullerton**	**6**
2	Stanford	5
1	**Cal State Fullerton**	**11**
3	New Mexico	3

Regional finals
1	**UCLA**	**6**	—
3	UC Irvine	2	—
4	Minnesota	2	5
1	**Cal State Fullerton**	**7**	**9**

Super regionals
6	**UCLA**	3	**11**^{10}	**8**
Cal State Fullerton	**4**	7	1

=== Gainesville Super Regional ===
Regional	Regional
1	**Miami (FL)**	**12**
4	Dartmouth	8
1	**Miami (FL)**	**14**
2	Texas A&M	1
3	FIU	3
2	**Texas A&M**	**17**
Coral Gables Regional – Alex Rodriguez Park at Mark Light Field
4	**Dartmouth**	**15**
3	FIU	8
4	Dartmouth	3
2	**Texas A&M**	**4**
1	**Florida**	**7**
4	Bethune–Cookman	3
1	**Florida**	**10**
3	Oregon State	2
3	**Oregon State**	**6**
2	Florida Atlantic	4
Gainesville Regional – McKethan Stadium
4	Bethune–Cookman	6
2	**Florida Atlantic**	**12**
2	**Florida Atlantic**	**11**
3	Oregon State	7

Regional finals
1	**Miami (FL)**	7	**10**
2	Texas A&M	**11**	3
1	**Florida**	**15**	—
2	Florida Atlantic	0	—

Super regionals
Miami	2	3	—
3	**Florida**	**7**	**4**^{10}	—

== College World Series ==
=== Participants ===
School	Conference	Record (conference)	Head coach	Previous CWS appearances	Best CWS finish	CWS record Not including this year
Arizona State	Pac-10	51–8 (20–7)	Tim Esmay	21 (last: 2009)	1st (1965, 1967, 1969, 1977, 1981)	61–36
Clemson	ACC	43–23 (18–12)	Jack Leggett	11 (last: 2006)	3rd (1996, 2002)	10–22
Florida	SEC	47–15 (22–8)	Kevin O'Sullivan	5 (last: 2005)	2nd (2005)	8–11
Florida State	ACC	47–18 (18–12)	Mike Martin	19 (last: 2008)	2nd (1970, 1986, 1999)	25–38
Oklahoma	Big 12	49–16 (15–10)	Sunny Golloway	9 (last: 1995)	1st (1951, 1994)	14–14
South Carolina	SEC	48–15 (21–9)	Ray Tanner	8 (last: 2004)	2nd (1975, 1977, 2002)	17–16
TCU	MWC	51–12 (19–5)	Jim Schlossnagle	0 (last: none)	none	0–0
UCLA	Pac-10	48–14 (18–9)	John Savage	2 (last: 1997)	7th (1969, 1997)	0–4

=== Bracket ===
The CWS uses two four-team brackets with double elimination format; teams play games until they accumulate two losses and no team may play a team from the other bracket. The winners of the two four-team brackets play a best-of-three series for the championship.

First round
Florida State	1
**TCU**	**8**
6	**UCLA**	**11**
3	Florida	3
3	Florida	5
**Florida State**	**8**
South Carolina	3
**Oklahoma**	**4**
**Clemson**	**6**
1	Arizona State	3
1	Arizona State	4
**South Carolina**	**11**

Second round
TCU	3
6	**UCLA**	**6**
Florida State	7
**TCU**	**11**
Oklahoma	4
**Clemson**	**6**
**South Carolina**	**3**^{12}
Oklahoma	2

Semifinals
6	**UCLA**	2	**10**
TCU	**6**	3
Clemson	1	3
**South Carolina**	**5**	**4**

Finals
6	UCLA	1	1	–
**South Carolina**	**7**	**2**^{11}	–

=== Championship series ===
==== Game 1 ====
Monday, June 28 6:30 pm Omaha, Nebraska ESPN
Team	1	2	3	4	5	6	7	8	9	R	H	E
**South Carolina**	2	1	2	0	1	0	0	1	0	**7**	**14**	**2**
UCLA	0	0	0	0	0	0	0	0	1	**1**	**3**	**2**
WP: B. Cooper LP: G. Cole; Attendance: 23,181; Notes: South Carolina allowed the fewest hits in a championship series game; Cole gave up career-high 11 hits and 6 runs.

==== Game 2 ====
Tuesday, June 29 6:30 pm Omaha, Nebraska ESPN
Team	1	2	3	4	5	6	7	8	9	10	11	R	H	E
UCLA	0	0	0	0	1	0	0	0	0	0	0	**1**	**8**	**1**
**South Carolina**	0	0	0	0	0	0	0	1	0	0	1	**2**	**9**	**1**
WP: M. Price LP: D. Klein; Attendance: 24,390

=== All-Tournament Team ===
The following players were members of the College World Series All-Tournament Team.

Position	Player	School
P	Trevor Bauer	UCLA
P	Matt Purke	TCU
C	Bryan Holaday	TCU
1B	Christian Walker	South Carolina
2B	Cody Regis	UCLA
3B	John Hinson	Clemson
SS	Taylor Featherston	TCU
OF	Beau Amaral	UCLA
OF	**Jackie Bradley Jr. (MOP)**	South Carolina
OF	Evan Marzilli	South Carolina
DH	Brady Thomas	South Carolina

== Final standings ==
Seeds listed below indicate national seeds only

Place	School	Record
1st	South Carolina	11–1
2nd	#6 UCLA	8–4
3rd	Clemson	7–4
3rd	TCU	8–3
5th	Florida State	6–3
5th	Oklahoma	6–3
7th	#1 Arizona State	5–2
7th	#3 Florida	5–2
9th	Alabama	5–3
9th	Arkansas	3–3
9th	Cal State Fullerton	5–3
9th	#4 Coastal Carolina	4–3
9th	Miami (FL)	3–3
9th	#2 Texas	4–2
9th	Vanderbilt	5–3
9th	#5 Virginia	4–3
17th	Auburn	3–2
17th	Baylor	2–2
17th	College of Charleston	2–2
17th	Florida Atlantic	2–2
17th	#8 Georgia Tech	2–2
17th	Hawaii	2–2
17th	#7 Louisville	2–2
17th	Minnesota	2–2
17th	North Carolina	2–2
17th	Oregon	2–2
17th	Rice	2–2
17th	St. John's	3–2
17th	Texas A&M	3–2
17th	UC Irvine	2–2
17th	Virginia Tech	2–2
17th	Washington State	3–2
33rd	Arizona	1–2
33rd	Connecticut	1–2
33rd	Dartmouth	1–2
33rd	Illinois State	1–2
33rd	Kansas State	1–2
33rd	Louisiana–Lafayette	1–2
33rd	LSU	1–2
33rd	Mercer	1–2
33rd	New Mexico	1–2
33rd	Ole Miss	1–2
33rd	Oral Roberts	1–2
33rd	Oregon State	1–2
33rd	San Diego	1–2
33rd	Southern Miss	1–2
33rd	Stony Brook	1–2
33rd	The Citadel	1–2
49th	Bethune–Cookman	0–2
49th	Bucknell	0–2
49th	California	0–2
49th	Central Connecticut	0–2
49th	Elon	0–2
49th	FIU	0–2
49th	Grambling State	0–2
49th	Jacksonville State	0–2
49th	Kent State	0–2
49th	Lamar	0–2
49th	Milwaukee	0–2
49th	NC State	0–2
49th	Rider	0–2
49th	Saint Louis	0–2
49th	Stanford	0–2
49th	VCU	0–2

- # denotes national seed

== Record by conference ==
Conference	# of Bids	Record	Win %	RF	SR	WS	NS	CS	NC
Southeastern	8	34–18	.654	6	5	2	1	1	1
Pac-10	8	20–18	.526	4	2	2	1	1	–
Atlantic Coast	8	26–21	.553	7	4	2	1	–	–
Mountain West	2	9–5	.643	1	1	1	1	–	–
Big 12	5	16–11	.593	4	2	1	–	–	–
Big West	2	7–5	.583	2	1	–	–	–	–
Big South	1	4–3	.571	1	1	–	–	–	–
Big East	3	6–6	.500	2	–	–	–	–	–
Southern	3	3–6	.333	1	–	–	–	–	–
Sun Belt	3	3–6	.333	1	–	–	–	–	–
Conference USA	2	3–4	.429	1	–	–	–	–	–
Other	19	10–38	.208	2	–	–	–	–	–

The columns RF, SR, WS, NS, CS, and NC respectively stand for the regional finals, super regionals, College World Series, national semifinals, championship series, and national champion.

== Tournament notes ==
=== Round 1 ===
- 15 of 16 No. 1 seeds won their first-round games, with Cal State Fullerton being the only No. 1 seed to lose (3–1 to No. 4 Minnesota).
- Eight No. 3 seeds (half the field) won their first-round games in upsets.

=== Round 2 ===
- 13 of 16 No. 1 seeds won their first 2 games. The others were: No. 4 Minnesota, No. 2 Clemson and No. 2 College of Charleston
- Two No. 2 seeds were eliminated in two games: No. 2 California and No. 2 Stanford

=== Regional finals ===
- 13 No. 1 seeds and three No. 2 seeds advanced to the Super Regional; no No. 3 or No. 4 seeds advanced.
- Georgia Tech (No. 8) and Louisville (No. 7) were the only national seeds to not advance to the Super Regional.

=== Super regionals ===
- TCU qualified for its first ever College World Series by beating Texas.
- Only 3 of 8 National Seeds qualified for the College World Series.

=== College World Series ===
- NCBWA (National College Baseball Writers Association) named TCU Head coach Jim Schlossnagle the 2010 National Coach of the Year.
- Collegiate Baseball and Baseball America named South Carolina Head coach Ray Tanner the 2010 National Coach of the Year.
- UCLA head coach John Savage was named the national Coach of the Year by College Baseball Insider.
- South Carolina received the Opening Ceremonies award for highest team GPA (3.12) of the eight schools that made it to Omaha.
- Only one team from the 2009 CWS, Arizona State, returned for 2010.
- This was the 18th consecutive year that the SEC has fielded at least one team in the College World Series.
- South Carolina pitcher Matt Price (first team) and first baseman Christian Walker (second team) were named Freshman All-Americans by Baseball America.
- UCLA center fielder Beau Amaral, who led the Bruins with a .354 batting average in 64 games, was named a second-team Freshman All-America selection by Baseball America.
- UCLA pitchers Trevor Bauer and Gerrit Cole were named to the 2010 College All-America Team (second-team and third-team, respectively) by Baseball America.

=== First and second rounds ===
- TCU played in its first College World Series in school history.
- Florida was the first team eliminated after its 8–5 loss to in-state rival Florida State.
- Arizona State was eliminated after two games and became the first No. 1 overall seed team to go 0–2 in the CWS under the current 64-team format.
- Florida State had a season-high 5 errors in its second loss to TCU.
- In the first meeting between South Carolina and Oklahoma, the game was scheduled to start at 2:00 pm, but due to multiple weather delays the game did not end until after 11:00 pm.

=== Semi-finals ===
- None of the four semi-finalists, UCLA, TCU, South Carolina and Clemson, had won a previous CWS title.
- This CWS was the first since 2005 to feature an in-state rivalry in the final four with the meeting of South Carolina and Clemson.
- Trevor Bauer, with 13 strikeouts on June 26, led the nation with 165 strikeouts; UCLA led all schools with 700 strikeouts.

=== Finals ===
- UCLA played for its first-ever national championship in baseball (South Carolina had played in three previous Championship Games, 1975, 1977 and 2002).
- More than 300,000 fans attended the men's CWS for the fourth consecutive year, and the total attendance of 330,922 ranks second all-time.
- South Carolina won its first NCAA team national championship in any men's sport.
- UCLA's runner-up finish was the best in program history.
- Final game was the first championship to be decided in extra innings since 1970, and fifth all-time.
- Whit Merrifield's 11th-inning RBI single was the first walk-off to decide a championship since 2000.
- South Carolina became only the third school to win a CWS title after losing their opening game since the two-bracket format was adopted.
- South Carolina set a CWS record with six straight wins after losing their first game, and became only the third school ever to record six victories in a CWS.
- The CWS ended June 29, the latest ending date for the tournament. That record was broken in 2016.
