= 2010 Arizona Wildcats baseball team =

2010 Arizona Wildcats baseball

Fort Worth Regional
- Conference: Pacific-10 Conference
- Record: 34-24 (12-15 Pac-10)
- Head coach: Andy Lopez (10th season)
- Assistant coaches: Mark Wasikowski (8th season); Shaun Cole (1st season); Brett Scyphers (1st season)
- Home stadium: Sancet Stadium

2010 Pacific-10 Conference baseball standings
	Conf.				Overall
Team	W		L	PCT	W		L	PCT
No. 7 Arizona State ‍†‍‍^{y}	20	–	7	.741	52	–	10	.839
No. 2 UCLA ‍‍‍^{y}	18	–	9	.667	51	–	16	.761
Washington State ‍‍‍^{y}	15	–	12	.556	37	–	22	.627
Stanford ‍‍‍^{y}	14	–	13	.519	31	–	25	.554
Oregon ‍‍‍^{y}	13	–	14	.481	40	–	24	.625
California ‍‍‍^{y}	13	–	14	.481	29	–	25	.537
Arizona ‍‍‍^{y}	12	–	15	.444	34	–	24	.586
Oregon State ‍‍‍^{y}	12	–	15	.444	32	–	24	.571
Washington ‍‍‍	11	–	16	.407	28	–	28	.500
USC ‍‍‍	7	–	20	.259	28	–	32	.467
‡ – Pac-10 Conference champion y – Invited to the 2010 NCAA Division I baseball tournament As of December 16, 2010; Rankings from Coaches' Poll

The 2010 Arizona Wildcats baseball team represented the University of Arizona during the 2010 NCAA Division I baseball season. The Wildcats played their home games at Jerry Kindall Field at Frank Sancet Stadium. The team was coached by Andy Lopez in his 9th season at Arizona.

== Previous season ==
The Wildcats finished the 2009 season with a record of 30-25 (13-14 Conf.), missing the postseason for the first time since 2006 and only the 3rd time in Andy Lopez's tenure.

== Personnel ==
=== Roster ===
2010 Arizona Wildcats roster
Pitchers • 10 - Tyler Hale - Freshman • 12 - Cory Bernard - RS • 14 - Vincent Littleman - Freshman • 15 - Daniel Workman - Senior • 17 - Ryan Doyle - Junior • 18 - Kyle Simon - Sophomore • 19 - Joel Effertz - Freshman • 23 - Bryce Bandilla - Sophomore • 26 - Kurt Heyer - Freshman • 31 - Stephen Manthei - Freshman • 32 - Augey Bill - Freshman • 34 - Jared Forestieri - Freshman • 36 - Mark Hawkenson - Freshman • 42 - Nick Cunningham - Freshman • 45 - Michael Lopez - Freshman • 46 - Matt Chaffee - Junior • 49 - Joe Allison - Junior • 50 - Grayson Adams - RS Senior	Catchers • 27 - Jett Bandy - Sophomore • 30 - Jake Meskin - Sophomore Infielders • 5 - Seth Mejias-Brean - Freshman • 13 - Alex Mejia - Freshman • 20 - Josh Garcia - Junior • 21 - Rafael Valenzuela - Senior • 24 - Cole Frenzel - Freshman • 28 - David Lopez - Freshman • 37 - Bobby Brown - Sophomore • 38 - Bryce Ortega - Junior	Outfielders • 1 - Ethan Chavez - Sophomore • 4 - Bobby Rinard - Junior • 6 - Steve Selsky - Sophomore • 22 - Robert Refsnyder - Freshman • 35 - Joey Rickard - Freshman

=== Coaches ===
2010 Arizona Wildcats baseball coaching staff
- Andy Lopez - Head coach
- Mark Wasikowski - Assistant coach
- Shaun Cole - Assistant coach
- Brett Scyphers - Volunteer Assistant Coach

=== Opening day ===
Opening Day Starters
Name	Position
Bryce Ortega	Second baseman
Rafael Valenzuela	First baseman
Steve Selsky	Right fielder
Josh Garcia	Designated hitter
Jett Bandy	Catcher
Bobby Brown	Left fielder
Joey Rickard	Center fielder
Seth Mejias-Brean	Third baseman
Alex Mejia	Shortstop
Kurt Heyer	Starting pitcher

== Schedule and results ==
2010 Arizona Wildcats baseball game log
Regular season
Date	Opponent	Rank	Site/stadium	Score	Win	Loss	Save	Overall Record	Pac-10 Record
Feb 19	Utah Valley		Sancet Stadium • Tucson, AZ	W 8-1	Heyer (1-0)	Beecher (0-1)	None	1-0	
Feb 21	Utah Valley		Sancet Stadium • Tucson, AZ	W 8-7	Simon (1-0)	Gray (0-1)	None	2-0	
Feb 21	Utah Valley		Sancet Stadium • Tucson, AZ	W 18-1	Bandilla (1-0)	Brimhall (0-1)	None	3-0	
Feb 26	Long Beach State		Sancet Stadium • Tucson, AZ	L 7-8	Brown (1-0)	Bandilla (1-1)	None	3-1	
Feb 27	Long Beach State		Sancet Stadium • Tucson, AZ	L 3-10	Gagnon (1-1)	Simon (1-1)	None	3-2	
Feb 28	Long Beach State		Sancet Stadium • Tucson, AZ	Cancelled	-	-	-	-	-
Mar 2	UNLV		Sancet Stadium • Tucson, AZ	L 10-12	DeWeese (1-0)	Hale (0-1)	Hutchison (3)	3-3	
Mar 3	UNLV		Sancet Stadium • Tucson, AZ	W 5-4	Allison (1-0)	Lee (2-2)	None	4-3	
Mar 5	#18 Cal State Fullerton		Sancet Stadium • Tucson, AZ	W 8-7	Allison (2-0)	Ramirez (0-1)	None	5-3	
Mar 6	#18 Cal State Fullerton		Sancet Stadium • Tucson, AZ	L 1-6	Ramirez (1-1)	Simon (1-2)	None	5-4	
Mar 7	#18 Cal State Fullerton		Sancet Stadium • Tucson, AZ	W 10-1	Workman (1-0)	Rath (1-1)	None	6-4	
Mar 10	Saint Joseph's		Sancet Stadium • Tucson, AZ	W 17-3	Littleman (1-0)	Mullen (0-1)	None	7-4	
Mar 10	Saint Joseph's		Sancet Stadium • Tucson, AZ	W 12-2	Bandilla (2-1)	Mower (0-3)	None	8-4	
Mar 12	Northern Colorado		Sancet Stadium • Tucson, AZ	W 9-1	Heyer (2-0)	Quisenberry (0-2)	None	9-4	
Mar 13	Northern Colorado		Sancet Stadium • Tucson, AZ	W 7-6	Cunningham (1-0)	Scott (0-2)	Hale (1)	10-4	
Mar 14	Northern Colorado		Sancet Stadium • Tucson, AZ	W 18-4	Manthei (1-0)	Willman (1-1)	None	11-4	
Mar 16	Wichita State		Sancet Stadium • Tucson, AZ	W 13-5	Manthei (2-0)	Smith (2-1)	None	12-4	
Mar 17	Wichita State		Sancet Stadium • Tucson, AZ	W 19-0	Simon (2-2)	Kelley (2-1)	None	13-4	
Mar 19	Sacramento State		Sancet Stadium • Tucson, AZ	W 5-0	Heyer (3-0)	Todd (1-1)	None	14-4	
Mar 20	Sacramento State		Sancet Stadium • Tucson, AZ	W 8-7	Hale (1-1)	Chamberlin (2-1)	None	15-4	
Mar 21	Sacramento State		Sancet Stadium • Tucson, AZ	W 10-6	Simon (3-2)	Ramirez (0-1)	None	16-4	
Mar 23	New Mexico		Sancet Stadium • Tucson, AZ	W 10-4	Cunningham (2-0)	Carl (3-1)	None	17-4	
Mar 24	New Mexico		Sancet Stadium • Tucson, AZ	W 11-7	Simon (4-2)	House (1-1)	None	18-4	
Mar 26	Oregon		Sancet Stadium • Tucson, AZ	W 9-3	Heyer (4-0)	Anderson (4-2)	None	19-4	1-0
Mar 27	Oregon		Sancet Stadium • Tucson, AZ	W 8-4	Bandilla (3-1)	LaTempa (2-2)	Cunningham (1)	20-4	2-0
Mar 28	Oregon		Sancet Stadium • Tucson, AZ	L 8-9	Jones (1-1)	Cunningham (2-1)	McGough (2)	20-5	2-1
Apr 1	at California	#20	Evans Diamond • Berkeley, CA	L 2-7	Johnson (4-1)	Manthei (2-1)	None	20-6	2-2
Apr 3	at California	#20	Evans Diamond • Berkeley, CA	L 0-8	Jones (6-2)	Bandilla (3-2)	None	20-7	2-3
Apr 3	at California	#20	Evans Diamond • Berkeley, CA	L 3-4	Flemer (1-0)	Allison (2-1)	None	20-8	2-4
Apr 9	at Washington	#22	Husky Ballpark • Seattle, WA	W 7-2	Heyer (5-0)	Brown (0-2)	None	21-8	3-4
Apr 10	at Washington	#22	Husky Ballpark • Seattle, WA	L 2-10	Kittredge (5-2)	Bandilla (3-3)	None	21-9	3-5
Apr 11	at Washington	#22	Husky Ballpark • Seattle, WA	W 9-1	Simon (5-2)	Cimber (2-2)	None	22-9	4-5
Apr 12	at Gonzaga	#21	Washington Trust Field • Spokane, WA	W 5-4	Bill (1-0)	Danner (0-2)	None	23-9	
Apr 16	Washington State	#21	Sancet Stadium • Tucson, AZ	W 5-3	Heyer (6-0)	Arnold (3-2)	Bill (1)	24-9	5-5
Apr 17	Washington State	#21	Sancet Stadium • Tucson, AZ	W 13-6	Simon (6-2)	Stilley (1-1)	None	25-9	6-5
Apr 18	Washington State	#21	Sancet Stadium • Tucson, AZ	W 12-11	Littleman (2-0)	Conley (2-2)	None	26-9	7-5
Apr 20	at #1 Arizona State	#17	Packard Stadium • Tempe, AZ	W 4-2	Workman (2-0)	Rodgers (2-2)	Cunningham (2)	27-9	
Apr 23	#6 UCLA	#17	Sancet Stadium • Tucson, AZ	L 3-6	Klein (3-0)	Bill (1-1)	None	27-10	7-6
Apr 24	#6 UCLA	#17	Sancet Stadium • Tucson, AZ	L 2-6	Bauer (6-2)	Simon (6-3)	None	27-11	7-7
Apr 25	#6 UCLA	#17	Sancet Stadium • Tucson, AZ	W 6-4	Bandilla (4-3)	Rasmussen (6-1)	Cunningham (3)	28-11	8-7
Apr 30	at USC	#19	Dedeaux Field • Los Angeles, CA	L 0-6	Triggs (2-7)	Heyer (6-1)	None	28-12	8-8
May 1	at USC	#19	Dedeaux Field • Los Angeles, CA	L 5-7	Mount (4-3)	Simon (6-4)	Garcia (1)	28-13	8-9
May 2	at USC	#19	Dedeaux Field • Los Angeles, CA	W 9-7	Bandilla (5-3)	Garcia (1-3)	None	29-13	9-9
May 4	at #2 Arizona State	#22	Packard Stadium • Tempe, AZ	L 1-13	Rodgers (3-2)	Cunningham (2-2)	None	29-14	
May 7	Cal State Bakersfield	#22	Sancet Stadium • Tucson, AZ	L 2-7	Reyes (4-3)	Bandilla (5-4)	None	29-15	
May 8	Cal State Bakersfield	#22	Sancet Stadium • Tucson, AZ	W 17-6	Simon (7-4)	Medina (4-2)	None	30-15	
May 9	Cal State Bakersfield	#22	Sancet Stadium • Tucson, AZ	L 1-13	McCarthy (4-4)	Workman (2-1)	None	30-16	
May 15	#2 Arizona State		Sancet Stadium • Tucson, AZ	L 4-12	Blair (9-0)	Heyer (6-2)	None	30-17	9-10
May 16	#2 Arizona State		Sancet Stadium • Tucson, AZ	W 12-4	Simon (8-4)	Kelly (9-1)	None	31-17	10-10
May 17	#2 Arizona State		Sancet Stadium • Tucson, AZ	L 2-4	Lambson (6-2)	Workman (2-2)	Swagerty (11)	31-18	10-11
May 21	Stanford		Sancet Stadium • Tucson, AZ	L 1-3	Mooneyham (3-5)	Heyer (6-3)	Pracher (4)	31-19	10-12
May 22	Stanford		Sancet Stadium • Tucson, AZ	W 9-8	Bandilla (6-4)	Busick (5-2)	None	32-19	11-12
May 23	Stanford		Sancet Stadium • Tucson, AZ	L 4-8	McArdle (5-0)	Workman (2-3)	None	32-20	11-13
May 28	at Oregon State		Goss Stadium • Corvallis, OR	L 3-6	Peavey (5-3)	Heyer (6-4)	Waldron (2)	32-21	11-14
May 29	at Oregon State		Goss Stadium • Corvallis, OR	L 0-5	Gaviglio (3-3)	Simon (8-4)	None	32-22	11-15
May 30	at Oregon State		Goss Stadium • Corvallis, OR	W 3-1	Cunningham (3-2)	Waldron (4-5)	Bandilla (1)	33-22	12-15
NCAA Fort Worth Regional
Jun 4	vs (2) Baylor		Lupton Stadium • Fort Worth, TX	W 10-9	Heyer (7-4)	Tolleson (2-7)	None	34-22	
Jun 5	vs (1) #6 TCU		Lupton Stadium • Fort Worth, TX	L 5-11	Purke (13-0)	Simon (8-6)	None	34-23	
Jun 6	vs (2) Baylor		Lupton Stadium • Fort Worth, TX	L 2-4	Kempf (9-2)	Manthei (2-2)	Pinckard (12)	34-24	

=== Fort Worth Regional ===
Fort Worth Regional Regional Teams
(1) TCU Horned Frogs	(4) Lamar Cardinals	(2) Baylor Bears	(3) Arizona Wildcats

== 2010 MLB draft ==
Player	Position	Round	Overall	MLB Team
Steve Selsky	RF	34	1040	Colorado Rockies
