= 2010 South Carolina Gamecocks baseball team =

American college baseball season

2010 South Carolina Gamecocks baseball

Columbia Regional champions Myrtle Beach Super Regional champions

College World Series champions vs. UCLA, W 2–0
- Conference: Southeastern Conference

Ranking
- Coaches: No. 1
- CB: No. 1
- Record: 54–16 (21–9 SEC)
- Head coach: Ray Tanner (14th season)
- Assistant coaches: Chad Holbrook (2nd season); Mark Calvi (6th season); Sammy Esposito (3rd season)
- Home stadium: Carolina Stadium

2010 Southeastern Conference baseball standings
	Conf.				Overall
Team	W		L	PCT	W		L	PCT
Eastern
No. 7 Florida ^{x}‍†‍‍^{y}	22	–	8	.733	47	–	17	.734
No. 1 South Carolina ‍‍‍^{y}	21	–	9	.700	54	–	16	.771
No. 14 Vanderbilt ‍‍‍^{y}	16	–	12	.571	46	–	20	.697
Kentucky ‍‍‍	13	–	17	.433	31	–	25	.554
Tennessee ‍‍‍	12	–	18	.400	30	–	26	.536
Georgia ‍‍‍	5	–	23	.179	16	–	37	.302
Western
No. 19 Auburn ^{x}‍‍‍^{y}	20	–	10	.667	43	–	21	.672
No. 13 Arkansas ‍‍‍^{y}	18	–	12	.600	43	–	21	.672
Ole Miss ‍‍‍^{y}	16	–	14	.533	39	–	24	.619
No. 16 Alabama ‍‍‍^{y}	15	–	15	.500	42	–	25	.627
LSU ‍‍‡‍^{y}	14	–	16	.467	41	–	22	.651
Mississippi State ‍‍‍	6	–	24	.200	23	–	33	.411
x – Division champion † – Conference champion ‡ – Tournament champion y – Invited to the NCAA tournament As of June 29, 2010; Rankings from Baseball America

The 2010 South Carolina Gamecocks baseball team represented the University of South Carolina in the 2010 NCAA Division I baseball season. The Gamecocks played their home games in Carolina Stadium. The team was coached by Ray Tanner, who was in his fourteenth season at Carolina.

USC finished second in the Southeastern Conference regular season standings, and received an at-large bid to the 2010 NCAA Division I baseball tournament. The Gamecocks were designated the #1 seed and host of the Columbia Regional. Carolina went 3–0 in their Regional to advance to the Super Regionals. The Gamecocks beat Coastal Carolina in two games to win the Myrtle Beach Super Regional and advance to the 2010 College World Series. After losing the opener, the Gamecocks won their next six games to win the national championship, defeating UCLA in the CWS Championship Series in consecutive games, 7–1 and 2–1.

== Regular season ==
The Gamecocks won their first seven SEC series of the 2010 season, which continued a streak of ten straight dating back to the end of the 2009 season. Another carryover streak was that of Whit Merrifield, who set a USC record when he hit safely in his 26th game in a row during the March 10 contest against Valparaiso. Another school record was tied in that game, as Gamecock pitchers combined to strike out 18 batters. Scott Wingo set a USC record on March 13 when he was hit by a pitch for the 35th time in his college career.

Carolina lost the annual series against archrival Clemson for the first time since 2006 by losing two of three games against the Tigers. The March 6 game at Fluor Field was the first game between both schools at that stadium and the first game played in Greenville since the 1990 season.

Head Coach Ray Tanner recorded his 600th victory at USC with a 10–1 win over The Citadel on March 30, and his 1,000th career victory with a 2–0 win over Vanderbilt on April 11.

Overall, Carolina played nine schools that would eventually make the 2010 NCAA tournament (Alabama, Arkansas, Auburn, The Citadel, Clemson, College of Charleston, Florida, Mississippi, Vanderbilt). The Gamecocks compiled a 16–8 record against these schools. USC finished the regular season a perfect 15–0 in their midweek games.

== Postseason ==
=== SEC tournament ===
Carolina entered the SEC tournament as the #3 seed by virtue of finishing second in the Eastern Division (Florida claimed the #1 seed by winning the SEC regular season championship and Auburn claimed the #2 seed by finishing first in the Western Division). The Gamecocks would lose their first two games against Ole Miss and Auburn (both were teams that the Gamecocks won series against in the regular season) being eliminated from the tournament without posting a victory.

=== NCAA tournament ===
Carolina was awarded the #1 seed in the Columbia Regional of the 2010 NCAA tournament. On June 4, the Gamecocks opened regional play with #4 seed Bucknell. USC trailed 5–1 before rallying for five runs in the eighth inning, going on to defeat the Bison, 9–5. On June 5, Carolina would face #3 seed in-state foe, The Citadel, whom the Gamecocks had defeated twice during the regular season. Facing Bulldog ace and MLB first-round draft pick Asher Wojciechowski, USC would again come from behind, scoring five in the seventh and another two in the ninth to overcome a 4–2 deficit for the 9–4 victory, riding Blake Cooper's career-high 12 strikeouts. On June 6, Carolina squared off against #2 seed Virginia Tech, and scored six in the sixth to defeat the Hokies, 10–2, to sweep the Columbia Regional Championship and advance to the Super Regionals.

The Gamecocks were sent on the road to the Myrtle Beach Super Regional to face #4 national seed Coastal Carolina. On June 12, Carolina defeated Coastal, 4–3, behind four early runs and another quality start by staff ace Blake Cooper. On June 13, the Gamecocks again found themselves needing to come from behind in the late-innings. Trailing the Chanticleers 9–7 in the eighth, freshman first-baseman Christian Walker became an instant hero with a 3-run blast that led to a 10–9 victory and a ninth trip to Omaha for South Carolina.

=== College World Series ===
By virtue of their Super Regional sweep of Coastal Carolina, South Carolina joined Arizona State, Clemson, Florida, Florida State, Oklahoma, TCU, and UCLA in the 2010 College World Series. Before this year's appearance, South Carolina had a 17–16 record in the CWS, with runner-up finishes in 1975, 1977 and 2002. On June 20, the Gamecocks lost their opener to Oklahoma, 4–3, in a game that was played over nine hours due to two lengthy delays for rain and lightning. Playing out of the losers' bracket with no margin for error, Carolina drubbed #1 national seed Arizona State 11–4 on June 22, scoring eight runs in the second inning to send the Sun Devils home. On June 24, the Gamecocks eliminated Oklahoma behind more late-inning heroics. Trailing 2–1 and down to their last strike in the 12th inning, Jackie Bradley Jr. singled home the tying run and following a walk to pinch-hitter Jeffery Jones, Brady Thomas lined the first pitch he saw up the middle for a walk-off RBI single. In a repeat of the 2002 CWS, Carolina found themselves in the position of having to beat Clemson twice in order to advance to the Championship Series. On June 25, Michael Roth made his first pitching start in over a year for the Gamecocks, and shut down the red-hot bats of the Tigers with a three-hit, complete-game performance in a dominating 5–1 victory. The following evening saw a rematch of the archrivals, with Carolina defeating Clemson, 4–3, and moving on to face UCLA in the CWS Finals. The Gamecocks and the Bruins were both playing for the first baseball national championship for either school, and Carolina put themselves in the driver's seat as they cruised to a 7–1 victory in the first game of the series. Game 2 would turn out to be the last CWS game ever played in historic Johnny Rosenblatt Stadium, and it was one for the ages. The Gamecocks and Bruins were locked in a pitchers' duel, and UCLA held a 1–0 lead until the bottom of the eighth when Carolina tied things up. The respective closers for the two teams would continue the pitching battle for another three innings, until the bottom of the 11th when Scott Wingo drew a leadoff walk, advanced to second on a passed ball and was moved to third on a sacrifice bunt. With one out, UCLA decided to pitch to Whit Merrifield, who lined a 2–0 pitch into right field to bring home the winning run.

== Personnel ==
=== Roster ===
2010 South Carolina Gamecocks roster
Pitchers: 9 Steven Neff – Sophomore; 12 Jimmy Revan – Sophomore; 14 John Taylor – Junior; 15 Nolan Belcher – Sophomore; 17 Jose Mata – Junior; 20 Sam Dyson – Junior; 21 Greg Harrison – (redshirt) Freshman; 22 Matt Price – Freshman; 25 Adam Westmoreland – (redshirt) Sophomore; 27 Blake Cooper – Senior; 29 Michael Roth – Sophomore; 32 Ethan Carter – Freshman; 33 Alex Burrell – Sophomore; 34 Jordan Propst – Senior; 35 Logan Munson – Junior; 37 Jay Brown – Senior; 38 Tyler Webb – Freshman; 39 Patrick Sullivan – Freshman; 44 Colby Holmes – Freshman	Infielders: 3 Adrian Morales – Junior; 6 Jeffery Jones – Senior; 8 Scott Wingo – Junior; 10 Anthony Iacomini – (redshirt) Freshman; 13 Christian Walker – Freshman; 23 Bobby Haney – Senior; 47 Nick Ebert – Senior; Catchers: 7 Richard Royal – Sophomore; 18 Kyle Enders – Senior; 24 Brison Celek – Freshman; 36 Brady Thomas – Senior	Outfielders: 5 Whit Merrifield – Junior; 16 Austin Ashmore – (redshirt) Freshman; 19 Jackie Bradley Jr. – Sophomore; 26 Adam Matthews – Sophomore; 31 Evan Marzilli – Freshman; 40 Jake Williams – Junior; Utility: 4 Robert Beary – Junior; 42 Parker Bangs – Junior

2010 South Carolina Gamecocks Baseball Roster & Bios http://gamecocksonline.cstv.com/sports/m-basebl/mtt/scar-m-basebl-mtt.html

=== Coaching staff ===
2010 South Carolina Gamecocks baseball coaching staff
- 1 Ray Tanner – Head coach – 14 years
- 2 Chad Holbrook – Assistant coach – 2 years
- 48 Mark Calvi – Assistant coach – 6 years
- 41 Sammy Esposito – Assistant coach – 3 years

2010 South Carolina Gamecocks Baseball Coaches & Bios http://gamecocksonline.cstv.com/sports/m-basebl/mtt/scar-m-basebl-mtt.html#coaches

== Schedule ==
2010 South Carolina Gamecocks baseball game log
Regular season (43–13)
February (4–2)

#	Date	Opponent	Site/stadium	Score	Win	Loss	Save	Attendance	Overall record	SEC record
1	February 19	Duquesne	Carolina Stadium	10–3	Cooper (1–0)	Elms (0–1)	None	6,380	1–0	–
2	February 20	Duquesne	Carolina Stadium	13–3	Dyson (1–0)	Gillespie (0–1)	None	7,926	2–0	–
3	February 21	Duquesne	Carolina Stadium	5–3	Neff (1–0)	Heck (0–1)	None	6,910	3–0	–
4	February 26	@East Carolina	Clark-LeClair Stadium	6–2	Cooper (2–0)	Maness (0–2)	Taylor (1)	3,214	4–0	–
5	February 27	@East Carolina	Clark-LeClair Stadium	3–4	Simmons (1–0)	Taylor (0–1)	None	4,461	4–1	–
6	February 28	@East Carolina	Clark-LeClair Stadium	2–4	Mincey (1–1)	Neff (1–1)	Simmons (1)	3,743	4–2	–

March (16–3)

#	Date	Opponent	Site/stadium	Score	Win	Loss	Save	Attendance	Overall record	SEC record
7	March 3	Presbyterian	Carolina Stadium	15–0	Belcher (1–0)	Harmon (0–1)	None	5,217	5–2	–
8	March 5	@Clemson	Doug Kingsmore Stadium	3–4	Haselden (2–0)	Roth (0–1)	None	6,346	5–3	–
9	March 6	vs. Clemson	Fluor Field	7–5	Price (1–0)	Cruz (1–1)	Roth (1)	7,105	6–3	–
10	March 7	Clemson	Carolina Stadium	6–19	Weismann (2–0)	Webb (0–1)	None	8,214	6–4	–
11	March 9	Valparaiso	Carolina Stadium	12–4	Mata (1–0)	Shafer (1–1)	None	5,295	7–4	–
12	March 10	Valparaiso	Carolina Stadium	7–3	Price (2–0)	Robinson (0–4)	None	4,902	8–4	–
13	March 13	Brown	Carolina Stadium	8–4	Cooper (3–0)	Gormley (0–1)	None	5,053	9–4	–
14	March 13	Brown	Carolina Stadium	10–7	Brown (1–0)	Weidig (0–2)	Roth (2)	5,250	10–4	–
15	March 14	Brown	Carolina Stadium	6–5^{10}	Revan (1–0)	Kimball (0–1)	None	5,307	11–4	–
16	March 16	@Furman	Fluor Field	15–0	Belcher (2–0)	Benton (0–4)	None	3,256	12–4	–
17	March 17	Davidson	Carolina Stadium	8–3	Mata (2–0)	Lamb (1–3)	None	5,054	13–4	–
18	March 19	Tennessee	Carolina Stadium	4–2	Carter (1–0)	Locante (1–1)	None	6,211	14–4	1–0
19	March 20	Tennessee	Carolina Stadium	10–7	Bangs (1–0)	Steckenrider (0–1)	None	7,813	15–4	2–0
20	March 21	Tennessee	Carolina Stadium	4–0	Webb (1–1)	McCray (2–2)	Price (1)	5,629	16–4	3–0
21	March 23	@Georgia Southern	J. I. Clements Stadium	8–5^{13}	Taylor (1–1)	Snow (0–1)	None	2,022	17–4	–
22	March 26	@Auburn	Plainsman Park	11–5	Cooper (4–0)	Luckie (1–1)	None	3,458	18–4	4–0
23	March 27	@Auburn	Plainsman Park	2–0	Dyson (2–0)	Nelson (4–1)	Price (2)	2,970	19–4	5–0
24	March 28	@Auburn	Plainsman Park	6–10	Dayton (3–1)	Webb (1–2)	None	2,316	19–5	5–1
25	March 30	The Citadel	Carolina Stadium	10–1	Holmes (1–0)	Clarkson (1–2)	None	6,451	20–5	–

April (13–3)

#	Date	Opponent	Site/stadium	Score	Win	Loss	Save	Attendance	Overall record	SEC record
26	April 2	Mississippi State	Carolina Stadium	10–2	Cooper (5–0)	Graveman (1–2)	None	7,019	21–5	6–1
27	April 3	Mississippi State	Carolina Stadium	7–8	Stratton (3–3)	Dyson (2–1)	Bracewell (4)	7,012	21–6	6–2
28	April 4	Mississippi State	Carolina Stadium	14–2	Price (3–0)	Whitney (0–1)	None	5,576	22–6	7–2
29	April 7	College of Charleston	Carolina Stadium	6–3	Holmes (2–0)	Zokan (2–1)	Roth (3)	7,523	23–6	–
30	April 9	@Vanderbilt	Hawkins Field	3–2	Cooper (6–0)	Gray (4–4)	Price (3)	2,853	24–6	8–2
31	April 10	@Vanderbilt	Hawkins Field	2–8	Armstrong (5–0)	Dyson (2–2)	None	3,197	24–7	8–3
32	April 11	@Vanderbilt	Hawkins Field	2–0	Brown (2–0)	Hill (3–3)	Price (4)	2,328	25–7	9–3
33	April 14	@The Citadel	Joe Riley Park	10–4	Taylor (2–1)	Pritcher (2–2)	None	4,087	26–7	–
34	April 16	Ole Miss	Carolina Stadium	5–0	Cooper (7–0)	Rothlin (3–4)	None	7,094	27–7	10–3
35	April 17	Ole Miss	Carolina Stadium	9–5	Dyson (3–2)	Barrett (6–2)	Carter (1)	7,952	28–7	11–3
36	April 18	Ole Miss	Carolina Stadium	4–5	Tracy (2–2)	Taylor (2–2)	Huber (4)	7,585	28–8	11–4
37	April 20	South Carolina Upstate	Carolina Stadium	4–2	Mata (3–0)	Bumgardner (0–5)	Carter (2)	6,409	29–8	–
38	April 23	@Georgia	Foley Field	11–4	Cooper (8–0)	Grimm (2–6)	None	2,642	30–8	12–4
39	April 25	@Georgia	Foley Field	5–0	Dyson (4–2)	Walters (1–4)	None	3,169	31–8	13–4
40	April 25	@Georgia	Foley Field	8–7	Carter (2–0)	Moseley (0–2)	None	3,169	32–8	14–4
41	April 30	Alabama	Carolina Stadium	9–7^{11}	Mata (4–0)	Kilcrease (3–2)	None	8,145	33–8	15–4

May (10–5)

#	Date	Opponent	Site/stadium	Score	Win	Loss	Save	Attendance	Overall record	SEC record
42	May 1	Alabama	Carolina Stadium	4–6	Morgan (5–2)	Dyson (4–3)	Smith (2)	8,053	33–9	15–5
43	May 2	Alabama	Carolina Stadium	20–15	Webb (2–2)	Wolfe (3–2)	None	8,006	34–9	16–5
44	May 5	Winthrop	Carolina Stadium	5–1	Mata (5–0)	Monteith (0–2)	None	6,014	35–9	–
45	May 7	@Kentucky	Cliff Hagan Stadium	13–9	Cooper (9–0)	Rogers (4–7)	Price (5)	2,183	36–9	17–5
46	May 8	@Kentucky	Cliff Hagan Stadium	1–2	Cooper (3–4)	Dyson (4–4)	Little (7)	1,755	36–10	17–6
47	May 9	@Kentucky	Cliff Hagan Stadium	3–9	Meyer (5–2)	Mata (5–1)	Kapteyn (2)	1,702	36–11	17–7
48	May 11	Wofford	Carolina Stadium	17–4	Belcher (3–0)	Collins (1–2)	None	6,402	37–11	–
49	May 12	Charleston Southern	Carolina Stadium	10–2	Mata (6–1)	McCready (0–6)	None	6,573	38–11	–
50	May 14	@Arkansas	Baum Stadium	3–2	Cooper (10–0)	Smyly (7–1)	Price (6)	9,622	39–11	18–7
51	May 15	@Arkansas	Baum Stadium	5–0	Dyson (5–4)	Bolsinger (5–3)	None	8,670	40–11	19–7
52	May 16	@Arkansas	Baum Stadium	5–3	Taylor (3–2)	Pratt (3–1)	Price (7)	8,227	41–11	20–7
53	May 18	Furman	Carolina Stadium	11–6	Neff (2–1)	Karow (0–2)	None	6,291	42–11	–
54	May 20	Florida	Carolina Stadium	2–3	Barfield (4–0)	Cooper (10–1)	Chapman (9)	8,188	42–12	20–8
55	May 21	Florida	Carolina Stadium	2–5	Rodriguez (1–0)	Dyson (5–5)	Chapman (10)	8,242	42–13	20–9
56	May 22	Florida	Carolina Stadium	11–6	Brown (3–0)	Johnson (5–3)	None	7,523	43–13	21–9

Postseason
SEC Tournament (0–2)

#	Date	Opponent	Site/stadium	Score	Win	Loss	Save	Attendance	Overall record	SECT Record
57	May 26	Ole Miss	Regions Park	0–3	Pomeranz (8–2)	Belcher (3–1)	Huber (11)	12,514	43–14	0–1
58	May 27	Auburn	Regions Park	1–3^{12}	Hubbard (5–2)	Price (3–1)	None	5,759	43–15	0–2

NCAA Regionals (3–0)

#	Date	Opponent	Site/stadium	Score	Win	Loss	Save	Attendance	Overall record	NCAAT Record
59	June 4	Bucknell	Carolina Stadium	9–5	Roth (1–1)	Carlin (3–6)	None	6,712	44–15	1–0
60	June 5	The Citadel	Carolina Stadium	9–4	Cooper (11–1)	Wojciechowski (12–3)	Price (8)	7,418	45–15	2–0
61	June 6	Virginia Tech	Carolina Stadium	10–2	Mata (7–1)	Price (7–4)	None	6,233	46–15	3–0

NCAA Super Regionals (2–0)

#	Date	Opponent	Site/stadium	Score	Win	Loss	Save	Attendance	Overall record	NCAAT Record
62	June 12	Coastal Carolina	BB&T Coastal Field	4–3	Cooper (12–1)	Rein (7–1)	Price (9)	6,599	47–15	4–0
63	June 13	Coastal Carolina	BB&T Coastal Field	10–9	Carter (3–0)	Fleet (6–2)	Price (10)	6,599	48–15	5–0

College World Series (6–1)

#	Date	Opponent	Site/stadium	Score	Win	Loss	Save	Attendance	Overall record	NCAAT Record
64	June 20	Oklahoma	Rosenblatt Stadium	3–4	Rocha (8–2)	Cooper (12–2)	None	22,835	48–16	5–1
65	June 22	Arizona State	Rosenblatt Stadium	11–4	Dyson (6–5)	Kelly (10–3)	None	19,936	49–16	6–1
66	June 24	Oklahoma	Rosenblatt Stadium	3–2^{12}	Webb (3–2)	Duke (3–2)	None	24,180	50–16	7–1
67	June 25	Clemson	Rosenblatt Stadium	5–1	Roth (2–1)	Leone (3–2)	None	22,334	51–16	8–1
68	June 26	Clemson	Rosenblatt Stadium	4–3	Price (4–1)	Harman (8–4)	None	12,593	52–16	9–1
69	June 28	UCLA	Rosenblatt Stadium	7–1	Cooper (13–2)	Cole (11–4)	None	23,181	53–16	10–1
70	June 29	UCLA	Rosenblatt Stadium	2–1 ^{11}	Price (5–1)	Klein (6–1)	None	24,390	54–16	11–1

2010 South Carolina Gamecocks Baseball Schedule http://gamecocksonline.cstv.com/sports/m-basebl/sched/scar-m-basebl-sched.html

== Honors and awards ==
- Tyler Webb was named SEC Freshman of the Week on March 22.
- Jay Brown was named SEC Pitcher of the Week on April 12.
- Blake Cooper was named SEC Pitcher of the Week on April 19.
- Sam Dyson was named SEC Pitcher of the Week on April 26 and on May 17.
- South Carolina was named Team of the Week on May 18 by CollegeBaseballInsider.com.
- Head coach Ray Tanner was named the National Coach of the Year by Collegiate Baseball and Baseball America.
- Pitcher Blake Cooper was named third-team All-American by Collegiate Baseball.
- Pitcher Matt Price (first team) and first baseman Christian Walker (second team) were named Freshman All-Americans by Baseball America.
- Blake Cooper (P), Jackie Bradley Jr. (OF), Kyle Enders (C), Evan Marzilli (OF) and Brady Thomas (DH) were named to the Columbia Regional All-Tournament Team.
- Adrian Morales was named Most Outstanding Player of the Columbia Regional.
- South Carolina received the CWS Opening Ceremonies award for highest team GPA (3.12) of the eight schools that made it to Omaha.
- Evan Marzilli (OF), Brady Thomas (DH) and Christian Walker (1B) were named to the College World Series All-Tournament Team.
- Jackie Bradley Jr. was named Most Outstanding Player of the 2010 College World Series.

== Rankings ==
Ranking movement
Poll	Pre- season	Feb. 22	Mar. 1	Mar. 8	Mar. 15	Mar. 22	Mar. 29	Apr. 5	Apr. 12	Apr. 19	Apr. 26	May 3	May 10	May 17	May 24	May 31	June 7	June 14	Final Poll
USA Today/ESPN Coaches' (Top 25)	NR	–	23	NR	NR	23	19	17	13	10	8	7	12	7	9	11	–	–	1
Baseball America (Top 25)	10	10	15	19	16	14	12	11	10	10	7	6	8	6	10	12	–	–	1
Collegiate Baseball (Top 30)	28	23	22	23	23	18	14	8	5	5	3	4	7	6	7	8	9	5	1
NCBWA (Top 30)	21	18	24	28	24	21	19	16	13	14	13	11	13	9	10	13	–	5	1
Rivals.com (Top 25)	13	12	13	20	20	16	12	12	9	9	7	5	9	6	7	9	–	–	1

- NR = Not ranked

== Gamecocks in the 2010 MLB draft ==
The following members of the South Carolina Gamecocks baseball program were drafted in the 2010 Major League Baseball draft.

Player	Position	Round	Overall	MLB team
Sam Dyson	RHP	4th	126th	Toronto Blue Jays
Whit Merrifield	OF	9th	269th	Kansas City Royals
Blake Cooper	RHP	12th	361st	Arizona Diamondbacks
Bobby Haney	SS	22nd	678th	San Francisco Giants
Steven Neff	LHP	23rd	689th	Kansas City Royals
Parker Bangs	RHP	31st	929th	Kansas City Royals
Jordan Propst	RHP	49th	1469th	Kansas City Royals
