= Tim Esmay =

American baseball coach

Playing career
- 1984–1985: Scottsdale CC
- 1986–1987: Arizona State
- Position: Infielder

Coaching career (HC unless noted)
- 1988–1990: Arizona State (asst.)
- 1994: Arizona State (asst.)
- 1995: Grand Canyon (asst.)
- 1996: Utah (asst.)
- 1997–2004: Utah
- 2005–2009: Arizona State (asst.)
- 2010–2014: Arizona State

Head coaching record
- Overall: 414–329–1
- Tournaments: NCAA: 11–8

Accomplishments and honors

Championships
- 1 WAC Northern Division Title (1997); 1 Pac-10 Regular season Title (2010); 4 NCAA Regional Appearances (2010, 2011. 2013, 2014); 2 NCAA Super Regional Appearances (2010, 2011); 1 College World Series Appearance (2010)

Tim Esmay is an American baseball coach. He is the former head coach of the Arizona State Sun Devils baseball team. He was the head coach of the Arizona State Sun Devils baseball team from prior to the 2010 season until the end of the 2014 season, when he announced his resignation. Esmay is an Arizona State alumnus, and he played baseball there from 1986–1987. After graduating from Arizona State in 1987, Esmay served as an assistant at Arizona State, Grand Canyon, and Utah. He was Utah's head coach from 1997–2004, before he was hired as an assistant at Arizona State prior to the 2005 season.

From 2005–2009, Esmay served as an assistant under Pat Murphy. Following the 2009 season, Murphy was forced to resign due to violations of NCAA rules regarding student-athlete employment and recruiting. Esmay was hired as an interim head coach for the 2010 season. After leading the Sun Devils to the 2010 College World Series, Arizona State removed the "interim" tag from his title and formally named him the fourth head coach of the varsity era. As a result of Murphy's violations, the NCAA imposed sanctions on the program, including a ban from the postseason in 2012.

Since 2024, Esmay has been the manager of the Arizona Athletics of the Arizona Complex League.

== Head coaching record ==
Record table
Season	Team	Overall	Conference	Standing	Postseason
Utah Utes (Western Athletic Conference) (1997–1999)
1997	Utah	36–21–1	22–8	1st (Northern)	
1998	Utah	23–31	12–18	3rd (Northern)	
1999	Utah	22–30	8–20	10th	
Utah Utes (Mountain West Conference) (2000–2004)
2000	Utah	26–30	15–15	T–3rd	
2001	Utah	27–29	14–16	T–3rd	
2002	Utah	33–26	16–14	2nd	
2003	Utah	24–32	10–20	5th	
2004	Utah	22–36	11–19	5th	
Utah:		213–235–1	108–130		
Arizona State Sun Devils (Pac-10/Pac-12) (2010–2014)
2010	Arizona State	52–10	20–7	1st	College World Series
2011	Arizona State	43–18	17–10	2nd	NCAA Super Regional
2012	Arizona State	36–20	18–12	T–4th	NCAA-imposed postseason ban
2013	Arizona State	37–22–1	16–14	T–4th	NCAA Regional
2014	Arizona State	33-24	19–11	3rd	NCAA Regional
Arizona State:		201–94–1	90–54		
Total:		414–329–2			
National champion Postseason invitational champion Conference regular season champion Conference regular season and conference tournament champion Division regular season champion Division regular season and conference tournament champion Conference tournament champion
