= 2010 UCLA Bruins baseball team =

American college baseball season

2010 UCLA Bruins baseball

Los Angeles Super Regional champions Los Angeles Regional champions

College World Series Finals vs. South Carolina, L 0-2
- Conference: Pacific-10 Conference

Ranking
- Coaches: No. 2
- Record: 51-17 (18-9 Pac-10)
- Head coach: John Savage (6th season)
- Assistant coaches: Rick Vanderhook (2nd season); P.C. Shaw (4th season); Steve Pearse (2nd season)
- Home stadium: Jackie Robinson Stadium

2010 Pacific-10 Conference baseball standings
| | Conf. | | | | Overall |
| Team | W | | L | PCT | W | | L | PCT |
|---|---|---|---|---|---|---|---|---|
| No. 7 Arizona State ‍†‍‍^{y} | 20 | – | 7 | .741 | 52 | – | 10 | .839 |
| No. 2 UCLA ‍‍‍^{y} | 18 | – | 9 | .667 | 51 | – | 16 | .761 |
| Washington State ‍‍‍^{y} | 15 | – | 12 | .556 | 37 | – | 22 | .627 |
| Stanford ‍‍‍^{y} | 14 | – | 13 | .519 | 31 | – | 25 | .554 |
| Oregon ‍‍‍^{y} | 13 | – | 14 | .481 | 40 | – | 24 | .625 |
| California ‍‍‍^{y} | 13 | – | 14 | .481 | 29 | – | 25 | .537 |
| Arizona ‍‍‍^{y} | 12 | – | 15 | .444 | 34 | – | 24 | .586 |
| Oregon State ‍‍‍^{y} | 12 | – | 15 | .444 | 32 | – | 24 | .571 |
| Washington ‍‍‍ | 11 | – | 16 | .407 | 28 | – | 28 | .500 |
| USC ‍‍‍ | 7 | – | 20 | .259 | 28 | – | 32 | .467 |
‡ – Pac-10 Conference champion y – Invited to the 2010 NCAA Division I baseball tournament As of December 16, 2010; Rankings from Coaches' Poll

The 2010 UCLA Bruins baseball team represented the University of California, Los Angeles in the 2010 NCAA Division I baseball season. The Bruins played their home games in Jackie Robinson Stadium. UCLA finished the regular season as the #2 team in the Pacific-10 Conference behind the Arizona State Sun Devils. The UCLA Bruins were selected to play in the 2010 NCAA Division I baseball tournament as the #1 seed in the Los Angeles, CA Regional and the #6 national seed. UCLA went 5–1 in the Regionals and beat UC Irvine in the finals to advance to the Super Regionals. The Bruins beat the Cal State Fullerton Titans in three games to win the Los Angeles Super Regional and advance to the 2010 College World Series.

Before the 2010 College World Series, the Bruins had never won a single game in the CWS. The team broke that 0–4 all time CWS record by defeating the #3 ranked Florida Gators in the first round, 11 to 3. The 2010 baseball team improved on their first ever CWS win by beating TCU 6 to 3 in the second round. Due to the double elimination format of the CWS, UCLA played TCU again in the semifinals. After losing the first game 6 to 2, the Bruins advanced to the Championship Series by defeating TCU 10 to 3 in the decisive second game. The South Carolina Gamecocks became the 2010 national champions after beating UCLA in two consecutive games, 7–1 and 2–1.

== Previous season ==
The Bruins completed the 2009 season with a 27–29 overall record, tying Oregon State for third place in the Pac-10 Conference behind #1 Arizona State and #2 Washington State. The Bruins were not invited to the 2009 NCAA Division I baseball tournament since Oregon State had a better overall record.

== Roster ==
2010 UCLA Bruins baseball team
Players
Coaches

| # | Pos. | Name | B/T | Height | Weight | Year | Previous school | Home town |
|---|---|---|---|---|---|---|---|---|
| 5 | OF | Javier Luque | L/L | 5 ft 8 in (1.73 m) | 170 lb (77 kg) | Fr | Golden Valley HS | Merced, CA |
| 47 | RHP | Trevor Bauer | R/R | 6 ft 1 in (1.85 m) | 175 lb (79 kg) | So | Hart HS | Valencia, CA |
| 35 | LHP | Mitchell Beacom | L/L | 6 ft 8 in (2.03 m) | 235 lb (107 kg) | RS So | University City HS | San Diego, CA |
| 34 | RHP | Chase Brewer | R/R | 6 ft 4 in (1.93 m) | 210 lb (95 kg) | RS Fr | Chaparral HS | Paradise Valley, AZ |
| 11 | C | Trevor Brown | R/R | 6 ft 2 in (1.88 m) | 170 lb (77 kg) | Fr | Hart HS | Valencia, CA |
| 38 | RHP | Garett Claypool | R/R | 6 ft 2 in (1.88 m) | 180 lb (82 kg) | Sr | El Camino HS | West Hills, CA |
| 12 | RHP | Gerrit Cole | R/R | 6 ft 4 in (1.93 m) | 220 lb (100 kg) | So | Orange Lutheran HS | Santa Ana, CA |
| 40 | RHP | Ryan Deeter (redshirt) | R/R | 6 ft 0 in (1.83 m) | 165 lb (75 kg) | Fr | Newark Memorial HS | Newark, CA |
| 8 | LHP | Matt Drummond | L/L | 6 ft 1 in (1.85 m) | 190 lb (86 kg) | RS Jr | Paso Robles HS | Paso Robles, CA |
| 9 | C | Blair Dunlap | R/R | 6 ft 0 in (1.83 m) | 190 lb (86 kg) | RS Sr | Santa Margarita HS | Mission Viejo, CA |
| 14 | INF | Dean Espy | R/R | 6 ft 1 in (1.85 m) | 210 lb (95 kg) | So | South Mountain CC | Mesa, AZ |
| 2 | INF | Niko Gallego | R/R | 5 ft 11 in (1.8 m) | 180 lb (82 kg) | Jr | Esperanza HS | Yorba Linda, CA |
| 20 | OF | Jeff Gelalich | L/R | 6 ft 1 in (1.85 m) | 195 lb (88 kg) | Fr | Bonita HS | LaVerne, CA |
| 21 | OF | Chris Giovinazzo | R/R | 6 ft 0 in (1.83 m) | 205 lb (93 kg) | Jr | Laguna Hills HS | Laguna Hills, CA |
| 36 | INF | Matt Giovinazzo (redshirt) | R/R | 6 ft 0 in (1.83 m) | 190 lb (86 kg) | Fr | Laguna Hills HS | Laguna Hills, CA |
| 33 | RHP | Erik Goeddel | R/R | 6 ft 3 in (1.91 m) | 185 lb (84 kg) | RS So | Bellarmine HS | Hillsborough, CA |
| 31 | LHP | Matt Grace | L/L | 6 ft 4 in (1.93 m) | 210 lb (95 kg) | Jr | Palos Verdes HS | Palos Verdes Estates, CA |
| 48 | RHP | Scott Griggs | R/R | 6 ft 4 in (1.93 m) | 205 lb (93 kg) | Fr | San Ramon Valley HS | Alamo, CA |
| 26 | RHP | Jordan Haver (redshirt) | R/R | 6 ft 5 in (1.96 m) | 210 lb (95 kg) | Sr | Wilson HS | Long Beach, CA |
| 32 | C | Tyler Heineman | S/R | 5 ft 10 in (1.78 m) | 175 lb (79 kg) | Fr | Windward School | Pacific Palisades, CA |
| 17 | C | Dennis Holt | L/L | 6 ft 2 in (1.88 m) | 185 lb (84 kg) | Fr | Esperanza HS | Yorba Linda, CA |
| 7 | OF | Cody Keefer | L/R | 6 ft 1 in (1.85 m) | 190 lb (86 kg) | Fr | Davis Senior HS | Davis, CA |
| 23 | RHP | Dan Klein | R/R | 6 ft 3 in (1.91 m) | 190 lb (86 kg) | RS So | Servite HS | Los Alamitos, CA |
| 24 | OF | Brett Krill | R/R | 6 ft 4 in (1.93 m) | 225 lb (102 kg) | Jr | Aliso Niguel HS | Laguna Niguel, CA |
| 41 | RHP | Brandon Lodge | R/R | 6 ft 2 in (1.88 m) | 185 lb (84 kg) | RS So | Tesoro HS | Coto de Caza, CA |
| 44 | INF | Matt Mosher | L/R | 6 ft 5 in (1.96 m) | 235 lb (107 kg) | RS Fr | Menlo-Atherton HS | Menlo Park, CA |
| 30 | OF | Marc Navarro | L/R | 5 ft 11 in (1.8 m) | 180 lb (82 kg) | RS So | Santa Margarita HS | Laguna Hills, CA |
| 5 | INF | Tyler Rahmatulla | R/R | 5 ft 11 in (1.8 m) | 180 lb (82 kg) | So | Mater Dei HS | Mission Viejo, CA |
| 27 | LHP | Rob Rasmussen | L/L | 5 ft 11 in (1.8 m) | 170 lb (77 kg) | Jr | Pasadena Poly HS | Arcadia, CA |
| 18 | INF | Cody Regis | L/R | 6 ft 2 in (1.88 m) | 215 lb (98 kg) | Fr | Glendora HS | Glendora, CA |
| 3 | C | Steve Rodriguez | L/R | 6 ft 1 in (1.85 m) | 195 lb (88 kg) | So | St. John Bosco HS | Lomita, CA |
| 15 | INF | Justin Uribe | L/L | 5 ft 11 in (1.8 m) | 175 lb (79 kg) | Sr | Foothill HS | Santa Ana, CA |
| 4 | INF | Aaron Weimer (redshirt) | L/R | 5 ft 11 in (1.8 m) | 175 lb (79 kg) | Fr | Bullard HS | Fresno, CA |
| 1 | INF | Adrian Williams | R/R | 6 ft 0 in (1.83 m) | 170 lb (77 kg) | So | Canyon Springs HS | Moreno Valley, CA |
| 16 | RHP | Ian Williams (redshirt) | R/R | 6 ft 3 in (1.91 m) | 190 lb (86 kg) | Fr | St. Vincent HS | Petaluma, CA |

Head coach

John Savage

Assistant coach(es)

Rick Vanderhook
Steve Pearse
P.C. Shaw

Legend

- (C) Team captain
- (S) Suspended
- (I) Ineligible
- Injured
- Current redshirt

Roster
Last update: December 15, 2010

== Schedule ==
2010 UCLA Bruins baseball game log
Regular season
February

| # | Date | Opponent | Site/stadium | Score | Win | Loss | Save | Attendance | Overall record | Pac-10 record |
|---|---|---|---|---|---|---|---|---|---|---|
| 1 | February 19 | Southern | Jackie Robinson Stadium | 16–2 | G. Cole (1–0) | C. Richard (0–1) | None | 563 | 1–0 | – |
| 2 | February 20 | Bethune–Cookman | Urban Youth Academy | 10–3 | T. Bauer (1–0) | J. Morales (0–1) | None | 275 | 2–0 | – |
| 3 | February 21 | Cal State Northridge | Jackie Robinson Stadium | 14–5 | E. Goeddel (1–0) | B. Parry (0–1) | None | 806 | 3–0 | – |
| 4 | February 23 | Long Beach State | Blair Field | 10–1 | G. Claypool (1–0) | E. Magallon (0–1) | None | 1343 | 4–0 | – |
| 5 | February 26 | Vanderbilt | Jackie Robinson Stadium | 9–2 | G. Cole (2–0) | S. Gray (1–1) | None | 709 | 5–0 | – |
| – | February 27 | Oklahoma State | Jackie Robinson Stadium | Cancelled | | | | | 5–0 | – |
| 6 | February 28 | USC | Dodger Stadium | 6–1 | E. Goeddel (1–0) | B. Mount (0–1) | D. Klein (1) | 14,588 | 6–0 | – |

March

| # | Date | Opponent | Site/stadium | Score | Win | Loss | Save | Attendance | Overall record | Pac-10 record |
|---|---|---|---|---|---|---|---|---|---|---|
| Exh. | March 2 | Waseda University | Jackie Robinson Stadium | 6–4 | S. Griggs | Y. Saito | B. Lodge | 470 | 6–0 | – |
| 7 | March 5 | Nebraska | Jackie Robinson Stadium | 13–1 | G. Cole (3–0) | S. Yost (1–1) | None | 545 | 7–0 | – |
| 8 | March 5 | Nebraska | Jackie Robinson Stadium | 5–3 | T. Bauer (2–0) | M. Mariot (0–2) | D. Klein (2) | 545 | 8–0 | – |
| 9 | March 6 | Nebraska | Jackie Robinson Stadium | 5–4 | D. Klein (1–0) | C. Hauptman (0–2) | None | 515 | 9–0 | – |
| 10 | March 9 | UC Riverside | Jackie Robinson Stadium | 3–2 | M. Beacom (1–0) | D. Emmons (2–1) | None | 406 | 10–0 | – |
| 11 | March 12 | Texas A&M University–Corpus Christi | Whataburger Field | 11–3 | G. Cole (4–0) | R. Ferdin (1–1) | None | 3,705 | 11–0 | – |
| 12 | March 13 | Mississippi State | Whataburger Field | 5–2 | T. Bauer (3–0) | C. Stratton (2–2) | None | 4,122 | 12–0 | – |
| 13 | March 14 | Oklahoma | Whataburger Field | 5–2 | R. Rasmussen (1–0) | R. Gibson (2–1) | D. Klein (3) | 4,148 | 13–0 | – |
| 14 | March 19 | Oral Roberts | Jackie Robinson Stadium | 20–4 | G. Cole (5–0) | D. Bowen (1–2) | None | 651 | 14–0 | – |
| 15 | March 20 | Oral Roberts | Jackie Robinson Stadium | 12–2 | T. Bauer (4–0) | J. Burleson (1–2) | None | 1,022 | 15–0 | – |
| 16 | March 21 | Oral Roberts | Jackie Robinson Stadium | 9–1 | R. Rasmussen (2–0) | B. Smolen (1–1) | None | 922 | 16–0 | – |
| 17 | March 23 | UC Santa Barbara | Caesar Uyesaka Stadium | 7–1 | G. Claypool (2–0) | J. Meaux (3–1) | None | 280 | 17–0 | – |
| 18 | March 25 | Cal Poly | Jackie Robinson Stadium | 11–7 | G. Cole (6–0) | K. Anderson (1–3) | None | 412 | 18–0 | – |
| 19 | March 26 | Cal Poly | Jackie Robinson Stadium | 4–3 | T. Bauer (5–0) | E. Wright (0–1) | D. Klein (4) | 677 | 19–0 | – |
| 20 | March 27 | Cal Poly | Jackie Robinson Stadium | 6–4 | R. Rasmussen (3–0) | DJ Mauldin (2–1) | M. Grace (1) | 849 | 20–0 | – |
| 21 | March 30 | Pepperdine | Jackie Robinson Stadium | 2–1 | G. Claypool (3–0) | A. Gates (1–5) | D. Klein (5) | 823 | 21–0 | – |

April

| # | Date | Opponent | Site/stadium | Score | Win | Loss | Save | Attendance | Overall record | Pac-10 record |
|---|---|---|---|---|---|---|---|---|---|---|
| 22 | April 1 | Stanford | Jackie Robinson Stadium | 6–5 ^{10} | D. Klein (2–0) | A. Pracher (4–1) | None | 921 | 22–0 | 1–0 |
| 23 | April 2 | Stanford | Jackie Robinson Stadium | 8–4 | J. Pries (3–1) | T. Bauer (5–1) | None | 1,472 | 22–1 | 1–1 |
| 24 | April 3 | Stanford | Jackie Robinson Stadium | 7–5 | R. Rasmussen (4–0) | B. Mooneyham (0–4) | D. Klein (6) | 1,614 | 23–1 | 2–1 |
| 25 | April 6 | Cal State Fullerton | Jackie Robinson Stadium | 6–1 | D. Floro (1–0) | G. Claypool (3–1) | None | 1,517 | 23–2 | 2–1 |
| 26 | April 9 | Oregon State | Goss Stadium | 4–1 | G. Peavey (3–0) | M. Beacom (1–1) | None | 2,517 | 23–3 | 2–2 |
| 27 | April 10 | Oregon State | Goss Stadium | 3–1 ^{16} | G. Claypool (4–1) | R. Gorton (3–1) | None | 2,974 | 24–3 | 3–2 |
| 28 | April 11 | Oregon State | Goss Stadium | 8–2 | R. Rasmussen (5–0) | M. Boyd (4–1) | E. Goeddel (1) | 2,068 | 25–3 | 4–2 |
| 29 | April 13 | UC Riverside | Sports Complex | 10–0 | G. Claypool (5–1) | E. Orozco (0–2) | None | 551 | 26–3 | 4–2 |
| 30 | April 16 | Oregon | Jackie Robinson Stadium | 5–4 | S. McGough (4–0) | G. Cole (6–1) | None | 1,132 | 26–4 | 4–3 |
| 31 | April 17 | Oregon | Jackie Robinson Stadium | 8–4 | J. LaTempa (3–2) | T. Bauer (5–2) | None | 1,320 | 26–5 | 4–4 |
| 32 | April 18 | Oregon | Jackie Robinson Stadium | 5–1 | R. Rasmussen (6–0) | A. Keudell (4–4) | D. Klein (7) | 1,986 | 27–5 | 5–4 |
| 33 | April 20 | Long Beach State | Jackie Robinson Stadium | 16–4 | E. Magallon (1–1) | M. Drummond (0–1) | None | 362 | 27–6 | 5–4 |
| 34 | April 23 | Arizona | Kindall Field | 6–3 ^{10} | D. Klein (3–0) | A. Bill (1–1) | None | 1,050 | 28–6 | 6–4 |
| 35 | April 24 | Arizona | Kindall Field | 6–2 | T. Bauer (6–2) | K. Simon (6–3) | None | 1,223 | 29–6 | 7–4 |
| 36 | April 25 | Arizona | Kindall Field | 6–4 | B. Bandilla (4–3) | R. Rasmussen (6–1) | N. Cunningham (3) | 842 | 29–7 | 7–5 |
| 37 | April 27 | UC Irvine | Jackie Robinson Stadium | 4–1 | G. Claypool (6–1) | E. Brock (3–3) | D. Klein (8) | 581 | 30–7 | 7–5 |
| 38 | April 30 | Arizona State | Jackie Robinson Stadium | 5–1 | M. Lambson (5–2) | G. Cole (6–2) | None | 1,436 | 30–8 | 7–6 |

May

| # | Date | Opponent | Site/stadium | Score | Win | Loss | Save | Attendance | Overall record | Pac-10 record |
|---|---|---|---|---|---|---|---|---|---|---|
| 39 | May 1 | Arizona State | Jackie Robinson Stadium | 6–1 | M. Kelly (9–0) | T. Bauer (6–3) | B. Rodgers (3) | 1,725 | 30–9 | 7–7 |
| 40 | May 2 | Arizona State | Jackie Robinson Stadium | 12–3 | J. Borup (9–1) | R. Rasmussen (6–2) | None | 1,921 | 30–10 | 7–8 |
| 41 | May 4 | Pepperdine | Eddy D. Field Stadium | 5–1 | G. Claypool (7–1) | R. Dickmann (6–4) | None | 261 | 31–10 | 7–8 |
| 42 | May 7 | Washington | Husky Ballpark | 7–2 | G. Cole (7–2) | G. Brown (1–4) | None | 485 | 32–10 | 8–8 |
| 43 | May 8 | Washington | Husky Ballpark | 14–6 | T. Bauer (7–3) | A. Kittredge (6–4) | D. Klein (9) | 716 | 33–10 | 9–8 |
| 44 | May 9 | Washington | Husky Ballpark | 7–6 | R. Rasmussen (7–2) | F. Snow (4–2) | None | 562 | 34–10 | 10–8 |
| 45 | May 11 | UC Irvine | Cicerone Field | 2–1 | N. Hoover (2–0) | G. Claypool (7–2) | E. Brock (1) | 1,172 | 34–11 | 10–8 |
| 46 | May 14 | USC | Jackie Robinson Stadium | 13–7 | G. Cole (8–2) | B. Mount (5–4) | None | 1,707 | 35–11 | 11–8 |
| 47 | May 15 | USC | Jackie Robinson Stadium | 15–2 | T. Bauer (8–3) | C. Mezger (4–1) | None | 1,360 | 36–11 | 12–8 |
| 48 | May 16 | USC | Jackie Robinson Stadium | 2–1 | D. Klein (4–0) | C. Smith (4–6) | None | 1,531 | 37–11 | 13–8 |
| 49 | May 18 | UC Santa Barbara | Jackie Robinson Stadium | 6–2 | G. Claypool (8–2) | N. Capito (4–6) | None | 587 | 38–11 | 13–8 |
| 50 | May 21 | California | Evans Diamond | 8–7 | D. Klein (5–0) | M. Flemer (2–3) | None | 417 | 39–11 | 14–8 |
| 51 | May 22 | California | Evans Diamond | 12–4 | T. Bauer (9–3) | D. Anderson (4–3) | None | 534 | 40–11 | 15–8 |
| 52 | May 23 | California | Evans Diamond | 11–2 | R. Rasmussen (8–2) | J. Jones (9–5) | None | 737 | 41–11 | 16–8 |
| 53 | May 25 | Cal State Fullerton | Goodwin Field | 5–2 | No. Ramirez (9–1) | G. Claypool (8–3) | Ni. Ramirez (9) | 2,376 | 41–12 | 16–8 |
| 54 | May 28 | Washington State | Jackie Robinson Stadium | 6–1 | G. Cole (9–2) | C. Arnold (5–3) | None | 1,006 | 42–12 | 17–8 |
| 55 | May 29 | Washington State | Jackie Robinson Stadium | 6–4 | S. Harvey (3–1) | M. Grace (0–1) | A. Conley (11) | 1,170 | 42–13 | 17–9 |
| 56 | May 30 | Washington State | Jackie Robinson Stadium | 11–1 | R. Rasmussen (9–2) | A. Conley (5–3) | None | 1,165 | 43–13 | 18–9 |

Postseason
NCAA Regionals

| # | Date | Opponent | Site/stadium | Score | Win | Loss | Save | Attendance | Overall record | NCAAT Record |
|---|---|---|---|---|---|---|---|---|---|---|
| 57 | June 4 | Kent State | Jackie Robinson Stadium | 15–1 | G. Cole (10–2) | R. Sabo (6–5) | None | 1,482 | 44–13 | 1–0 |
| 58 | June 5 | LSU | Jackie Robinson Stadium | 6–3 | T. Bauer (10–3) | A. Ranaudo (5–3) | None | 2,613 | 45–13 | 2–0 |
| 59 | June 6 | UC Irvine | Jackie Robinson Stadium | 6–2 | R. Rasmussen (10–2) | E. Pettis (9–5) | None | 1,209 | 46–13 | 3–0 |

NCAA Super Regionals

| # | Date | Opponent | Site/stadium | Score | Win | Loss | Save | Attendance | Overall record | NCAAT Record |
|---|---|---|---|---|---|---|---|---|---|---|
| 60 | June 11 | Cal State Fullerton | Jackie Robinson Stadium | 4–3 | No. Ramirez (12–1) | G. Cole (10–3) | Ni. Ramirez (11) | 2,077 | 46–14 | 3–1 |
| 61 | June 12 | Cal State Fullerton | Jackie Robinson Stadium | 11–7 | D. Klein (6–0) | K. Rath (2–3) | None | 2,005 | 47–14 | 4–1 |
| 62 | June 13 | Cal State Fullerton | Jackie Robinson Stadium | 8–1 | R. Rasmussen (11–2) | D. Floro (7–2) | None | 1,967 | 48–14 | 5–1 |

College World Series

| # | Date | Opponent | Site/stadium | Score | Win | Loss | Save | Attendance | Overall record | NCAAT Record |
|---|---|---|---|---|---|---|---|---|---|---|
| 63 | June 19 | Florida | Johnny Rosenblatt Stadium | 11–3 | T. Bauer (11–3) | A. Panteliodis (11–3) | None | 23,271 | 49–14 | 6–1 |
| 64 | June 21 | TCU | Johnny Rosenblatt Stadium | 6–3 | G. Cole (11–3) | K. Winkler (12–2) | D. Klein (10) | 23,345 | 50–14 | 7–1 |
| 65 | June 25 | TCU | Johnny Rosenblatt Stadium | 6–2 | M. Purke (16–0) | R. Rasmussen (11–3) | T. Lockwood (8) | 22,334 | 50–15 | 7–2 |
| 66 | June 26 | TCU | Johnny Rosenblatt Stadium | 10–3 | T. Bauer (12–3) | K. Winkler (12–3) | None | 10,907 | 51–15 | 8–2 |
| 67 | June 28 | South Carolina | Johnny Rosenblatt Stadium | 7–1 | B. Cooper (3–1) | G. Cole (11–4) | None | 23,181 | 51–16 | 8–3 |
| 68 | June 29 | South Carolina | Johnny Rosenblatt Stadium | 2–1 ^{11} | M. Price (5–1) | D. Klein (6–1) | None | 24,390 | 51–17 | 8–4 |

2010 UCLA Bruins Baseball Schedule https://web.archive.org/web/20110430163223/http://www.uclabruins.com/sports/m-basebl/sched/ucla-m-basebl-sched.html

== Notes ==
- Cody Regis, Beau Amaral and Trevor Bauer were named to the All CWS Tournament Team.
- UCLA's extra inning loss was its fourth of seven CWS losses.
- Head coach John Savage was named the national Coach of the Year by College Baseball Insider. He was also named 2010 NCAA Division I Western Regional Coach of the Year by the American Baseball Coaches Association (ABCA).
- Center fielder Beau Amaral, who led the Bruins with a .354 batting average in 64 games, has been named a second-team Freshman All-America selection by Baseball America.
- Trevor Bauer and Gerrit Cole were named to the 2010 College All-America Team (second-team and third-team, respectively) by Baseball America.
- After the season, assistant coach Steve Pearse left UCLA for Reedley College; Niko Gallego signed with the Arizona Diamondbacks; reliever Erik Goeddel signed with the New York Mets; Rob Rasmussen signed with the Florida Marlins, Blair Dunlap signed with the Baltimore Orioles, LHP Matt Grace signed with the Washington Nationals (Gulf Coast League Nationals), and LHP Matt Drummond signed with the Baltimore Orioles (Gulf Coast League Orioles).

== Rankings ==
Ranking movement Legend: ██ Increase in ranking. ██ Decrease in ranking. ██ Not ranked the previous week. NR = Not ranked. RV = Receiving votes.
| Poll | Pre- season | Feb. 22 | Mar. 1 | Mar. 8 | Mar. 15 | Mar. 22 | Mar. 29 | Apr. 5 | Apr. 12 | Apr. 19 | Apr. 26 | May 3 | May 10 | May 17 | May 24 | May 31 | June 7 | June 14 | Final Poll |
|---|---|---|---|---|---|---|---|---|---|---|---|---|---|---|---|---|---|---|---|
| USA Today/ESPN Coaches' Poll (Top 25) | NR | – | 18 | 13 | 10 | 6 | 5 | 3 | 2 | 6 | 5 | 12 | 11 | 10 | 7 | 7 | – | – | 2 |
| Baseball America (Top 25) | 23 | 23 | 19 | 15 | 12 | 9 | 6 | 3 | 1 | 5 | 5 | 12 | 11 | 10 | 7 | 8 | – | – | 2 |
| Collegiate Baseball (Top 30)^ | 20 | 17 | 14 | 10 | 7 | 3 | 2 | 2 | 2 | 8 | 9 | 15 | 13 | 10 | 8 | 9 | 6 | 2 | 2 |
| NCBWA (Top 30) | 27 | 27 | 20 | 16 | 13 | 11 | 6 | 4 | 4 | 7 | 9 | 13 | 12 | 10 | 8 | 8 | – | 4 | 2 |
| Rivals.com (Top 25) | NR | NR | 23 | 16 | 11 | 11 | 5 | 2 | 1 | 5 | 4 | 10 | 10 | 7 | 5 | 5 | – | – | 2 |
^ Collegiate Baseball ranked 40 teams in their preseason poll, but will only rank 30 teams weekly during the season.

== UCLA Bruins in the 2010 MLB draft ==
The following members of the UCLA Bruins baseball program were drafted in the 2010 Major League Baseball draft.

| Player | Position | Round | Overall | MLB team |
|---|---|---|---|---|
| Rob Rasmussen | LHP | 2nd | 73rd | Florida Marlins |
| Dan Klein | RHP | 3rd | 85th | Baltimore Orioles |
| Matt Grace | LHP | 8th | 236th | Washington Nationals |
| Garett Claypool | RHP | 11th | 351st | Philadelphia Phillies |
| Matt Drummond | LHP | 20th | 598th | Baltimore Orioles |
| Chris Giovinazzo | OF | 21st | 650th | Colorado Rockies |
| Erik Goeddel | RHP | 24th | 722nd | New York Mets |
| Brett Krill | RF | 25th | 768th | San Francisco Giants |
| Niko Gallego | 2B | 27th | 811th | Arizona Diamondbacks |
| Mitchell Beacom | LHP | 36th | 1079th | Kansas City Royals |
| Javier Luque | OF | 41st | 1288th | Chicago Cubs |
