= Founders Park =

Baseball park at University of South Carolina

Coordinates: 33°59′12″N 81°2′38″W

- "The Rock by the River"
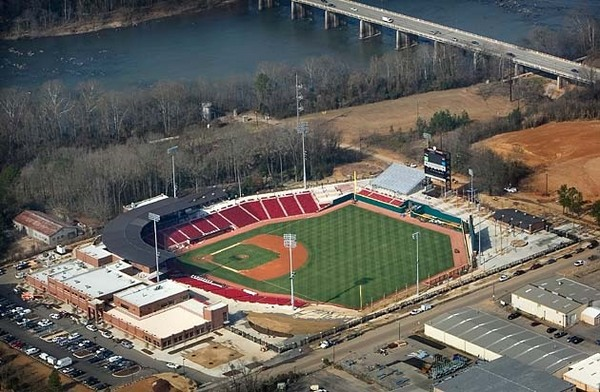
- Interactive map of Founders Park
- Former names: Carolina Stadium (2009–2015)
- Location: Columbia, South Carolina
- Capacity: 8,242 (total); 6,600 (seated)
- Surface: 419 Bermuda turf grass
- Record attendance: 8,242

Construction
- Groundbreaking: 2007
- Opened: February 21, 2009
- Cost: $35.6 million
- Architect: Populous
- General contractor: Contract Construction

Tenant
- South Carolina Gamecocks (2009-present)

Founders Park, formerly known as Carolina Stadium, is a ballpark in Columbia, South Carolina on the banks of the Congaree River. The facility cost $35.6 million to build and is the home stadium for the South Carolina Gamecocks college baseball team.

== Overview ==
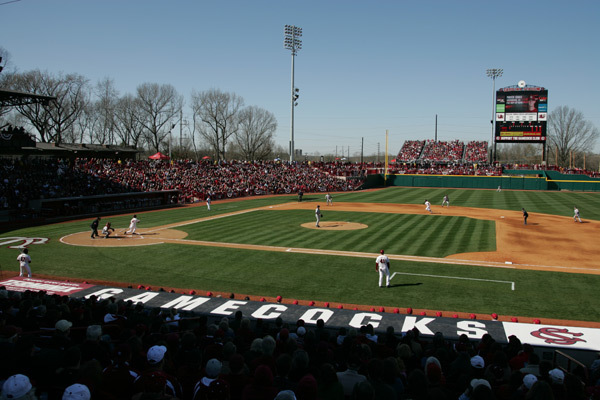
Gamecocks playing Duquesne on February 21, 2009

The dimensions of the field are 325 feet (99 m) down the right and left-field lines and 390 feet (120 m) to dead center, matching those of Sarge Frye Field, the previous home stadium of the Gamecocks. The baseball training facilities at the stadium include four indoor batting tunnels, a 3,900-square-foot (360 m^{2}) weight room, team clubhouse, coaches' offices, and a sports medicine room. Among the amenities for fans, there are five luxury suites and two club-level seating areas with lounges, a Gamecock store just inside the main entrance in the outfield plaza, along with a picnic terrace that accommodates around 120 people down the left-field line. The scoreboard towers 86 feet (26 m) over the left field wall and features a 28-by-16-foot video screen.

The main stadium entrance to Founders Park is located at the northeast corner of the grounds directly behind the center-field wall. Following the 2010 national championship, USC had a mural applied to the backside of its center-field wall (to be viewed as visitors and fans enter onto stadium grounds), celebrating the 2010 title. In addition, a showcase was built at the base of the wall for the display of the national championship trophy. The mural and trophy case have since been updated to honor both the 2010 and 2011 championship teams.

In 2013, the website Stadium Journey ranked Carolina Stadium as the second best Division I baseball venue, and received an average rating 4.6 of 5 stars in 7 categories. In 2014, the website ranked it first, with an average rating 4.7 of 5 stars in 7 categories.

In 2015, the ballpark's name was officially changed from Carolina Stadium to Founders Park, becoming only the third college baseball stadium in the United States with a corporate sponsorship. This advertising agreement was extended in 2024.

== History ==
The stadium opened on February 21, 2009, with a 13–0 South Carolina victory over Duquesne with 8,153 fans in attendance, setting a Gamecock home game attendance record. USC President Harris Pastides and former Gamecock baseball coaches Bobby Richardson and June Raines threw out ceremonial first pitches. Darius Rucker, who attended USC, sang the national anthem.

A stadium record attendance of 8,242 was set during a game against Florida on May 21, 2010. This record has been matched many times since. The highest attendance for a three-game weekend series, 24,726, was set on April 15–17, 2011, when the Gamecocks hosted #1 Vanderbilt.

=== Tournaments Hosted ===
NCAA Regional Tournaments: 2010, 2011, 2012, 2013, 2014, 2016, 2021, 2023

NCAA Super Regional Tournaments: 2011, 2012, 2016, 2021

=== Key dates ===
Event	Date	Opponent	Result
Broke ground	2007	-
First game	February 21, 2009	Duquesne	W 13–0
First sellout	May 21, 2010	Florida	L 2–5
100th win	March 3, 2012	Clemson	W 9–6
One millionth fan	May 9, 2012	Furman	W 7–0

== South Carolina Gamecocks' Record in Founders Park (2009–Present) ==
Year	Games	Overall W–L	Overall Win Pct	NCAA W–L	NCAA Win Pct	Total Attendance (SEC/Nat Rank)	Avg Attendance (SEC/Nat Rank)
2009	35	26–9	.742	0–0	-	231,360 (4th/4th)	6,805 (4th/4th)
2010	36	30–6	.833	3–0	1.000	236,529 (3rd/4th)	6,758 (4th/4th)
2011	40	36–4	.900	5–0	1.000	297,279 (2nd/2nd)	7,431 (4th/4th)
2012	39	32–7	.821	5–0	1.000	295,389 (2nd/2nd)	7,574 (3rd/3rd)
2013	37	31–6	.838	3–0	1.000	260,605 (3rd/3rd)	7,445 (5th/5th)
2014	41	34–7	.829	2–2	.500	305,564 (2nd/2nd)	7,453 (3rd/3rd)
2015	36	25–11	.694	0-0	.000	250,057 (3rd/3rd)	7,354 (4th/4th)
2016	41	34–7	.829	4-3	.571	293,677 (3rd/3rd)	7,162 (5th/5th)
2017	36	23–13	.639	0-0	.000	258,407 (4th/4th)	7,177 (5th/5th)
2018	34	24–10	.706	0-0	.000	229,434 (4th/4th)	6,748 (4th/4th)
Totals*	375	295–80	.787	22–5	.815	2,658,301	7,089

*Totals only reflect completed seasons

== See also ==
- List of NCAA Division I baseball venues
