= Andrew Aplin =

American professional baseball outfielder (born 1991)

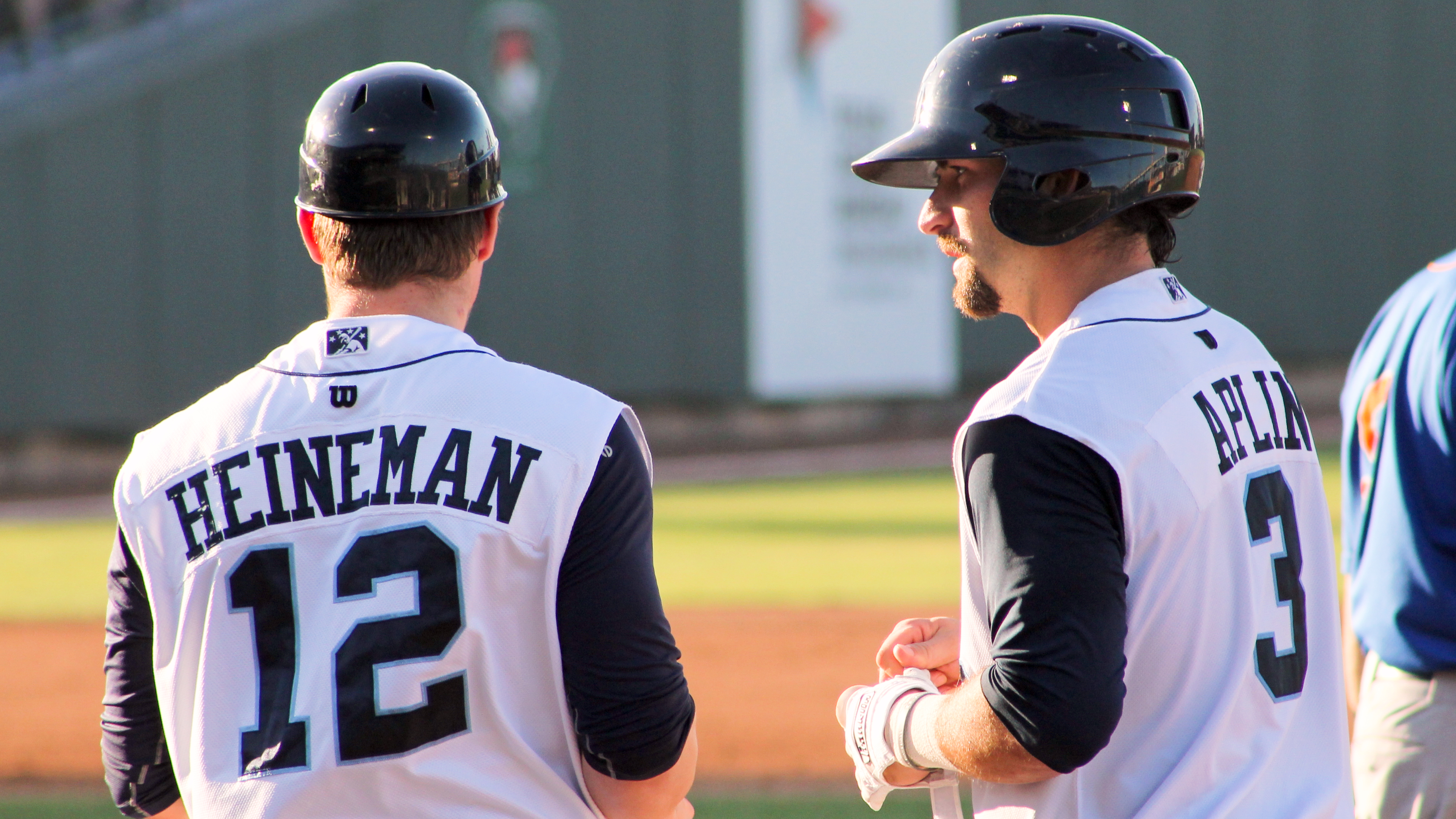
- Aplin (right) and Tyler Heineman (left) with the Corpus Christi Hooks in 2014
- Outfielder
- Born: March 21, 1991 (age 35); Suisun City, California, U.S.
- Bats: Left Throws: Left
- Stats at Baseball Reference
Medals
Men's baseball
Representing United States
World Junior Baseball Championship
Silver medal – second place	2008 Edmonton	Team

Andrew Ahyim Aplin (born March 21, 1991) is an American former professional baseball outfielder. He attended Arizona State University, where he played college baseball for the Arizona State Sun Devils.

== Amateur career ==
Aplin was born Suisun City, California, but lived in the Phoenix metropolitan area in the mid-1990s. When he was six, his family moved back to California. Aplin attended Vanden High School in Fairfield, California. After graduating, the New York Yankees selected Aplin in the 33rd round of the 2009 MLB draft. He did not sign, and instead enrolled at Arizona State University to play college baseball for the Arizona State Sun Devils baseball team. In 2011, he played collegiate summer baseball with the Orleans Firebirds of the Cape Cod Baseball League.

== Professional career ==
=== Houston Astros ===
The Houston Astros selected Aplin in the fifth round, with the 159th overall selection, of the 2012 MLB draft. He signed and made his professional debut for the Tri-City ValleyCats of the Class A-Short Season New York–Pennsylvania League.

In 2013, Aplin played for the Lancaster JetHawks of the Class A-Advanced California League. Aplin began the 2014 season with the Corpus Christi Hooks of the Class AA Texas League. At the trade deadline, the Astros traded outfielder Austin Wates to the Miami Marlins, and promoted Aplin to the Class AAA Pacific Coast League to replace him. The Astros added him to their 40-man roster after the 2015 season. Playing for Fresno in the PCL in 2015, he batted .223/.300/.318 in 399 at bats.

=== Seattle Mariners ===
On May 24, 2017, the Astros traded Aplin to the Seattle Mariners in exchange for a player to be named later or cash considerations. He was designated for assignment on June 2.

Aplin split the 2018 season between the Double–A Arkansas Travelers and Triple–A Tacoma Rainiers. In 78 games split between the two affiliates, he accumulated a .247/.343/.369 batting line with five home runs and 36 RBI. Aplin elected free agency following the season on November 2, 2018.

=== Arizona Diamondbacks ===
On November 13, 2018, Aplin signed a minor league deal with the Arizona Diamondbacks. He was released on May 16, 2019.

=== Lancaster Barnstormers ===
On June 30, 2019, Aplin signed with the Lancaster Barnstormers of the Atlantic League of Professional Baseball. He became a free agent following the season.
