= 2010 NCAA Division I baseball season =

Baseball season

- Duration: February 19, 2010–June 30, 2010
- Number of teams: 301
- Preseason No. 1: Texas

Tournament
- Duration: June 4–30, 2010
- Most conference bids: Pac-10, ACC and SEC (8)

College World Series
- Champions: South Carolina (1st title)
- Runners-up: UCLA (3rd CWS Appearance)
- Winning coach: Ray Tanner (1st title)
- MOP: Jackie Bradley Jr. (South Carolina)

Seasons
- ← 2009 2011 →

The 2010 NCAA Division I baseball season play of college baseball in the United States, organized by the National Collegiate Athletic Association (NCAA) at the Division I level, began on February 19, 2010. The season progressed through the regular season, many conference tournaments and championship series, and concluded with the 2010 NCAA Division I baseball tournament and 2010 College World Series. The College World Series, which consisted of the eight remaining teams in the NCAA tournament, was held in its annual location of Omaha, Nebraska. It was the final College World Series held at Omaha's Rosenblatt Stadium, which closed following the event. It concluded on June 30, 2010, with the final game of the best of three championship series. South Carolina defeated UCLA two games to none to claim their first championship, which was also South Carolina's first national championship in any men's sport.

== Realignment ==
=== New programs ===
Seattle added a varsity intercollegiate baseball program for the 2010 season.

=== Dropped programs ===
Both Northern Iowa and Vermont dropped their varsity intercollegiate baseball programs following the 2009 season.

=== Conference changes ===
Eight former Division I independents formed the new Great West Conference, whose champion would not qualify for the NCAA tournament. The eight schools that formed the conference were Chicago State, Houston Baptist, NJIT, North Dakota, Northern Colorado, NYIT, Texas–Pan American, and Utah Valley.

The Northeast Conference added Bryant, a former Division II member that had been an independent in 2009.

The Missouri Valley Conference, which lost Northern Iowa when it dropped its program, and the America East Conference, which lost Vermont when it dropped its program, each lost one member.

=== Conference formats ===
The Southland Conference eliminated the divisional format it had used from 2008–2009.

== Preseason ==
The Texas Longhorns, defeated by LSU in the 2009 CWS championship series, entered the season ranked #1 in the major polls. Defending national champions LSU received a #2 ranking in the preseason.

== Conference standings ==
America East Conference
	Conf				Overall			
Team	W	L	T	Pct	W	L	T	Pct
Binghamton	21	3	0	.857	31	20	0	.608
Maine	17	7	0	.708	34	22	0	.607
x–Stony Brook	15	9	0	.625	30	27	0	.526
Albany	10	14	0	.417	13	40	0	.245
Hartford	5	19	0	.208	11	37	0	.229
UMBC	4	20	0	.167	9	39	0	.188

Atlantic 10 Conference
	Conf				Overall			
Team	W	L	T	Pct	W	L	T	Pct
Charlotte	20	7	0	.741	39	17	0	.696
Xavier	18	9	0	.667	26	32	0	.448
Rhode Island	17	10	0	.630	31	26	0	.544
x–St. Louis	15	12	0	.556	33	29	0	.532
Fordham	15	12	0	.556	21	35	0	.375
George Washington	14	13	0	.519	26	28	0	.481
La Salle	14	13	0	.519	22	32	0	.407
Massachusetts	13	14	0	.519	19	27	0	.413
St. Joseph's	13	14	0	.481	18	29	0	.383
Dayton	12	15	0	.444	23	32	0	.418
Richmond	10	17	0	.370	24	28	0	.462
Duquesne	10	17	0	.370	16	40	0	.286
Temple	10	17	0	.370	14	37	0	.275
St. Bonaventure	8	19	0	.296	17	31	0	.354

Atlantic Coast Conference
	Conf				Overall			
Team	W	L	T	Pct	W	L	T	Pct
Atlantic Division
x–Florida State	18	12	0	.600	48	20	0	.706
y–Clemson	18	12	0	.600	45	25	0	.643
y–North Carolina State	15	15	0	.500	38	24	0	.613
Boston College	14	16	0	.467	30	28	0	.517
Wake Forest	8	22	0	.267	18	37	0	.327
Maryland	5	25	0	.167	17	39	0	.304
Coastal Division
y–Virginia	23	7	0	.767	51	14	0	.785
y–Georgia Tech	21	9	0	.700	47	15	0	.758
y–Miami (FL)	20	10	0	.667	43	20	0	.683
y–Virginia Tech	16	14	0	.533	40	22	0	.645
y–North Carolina	14	16	0	.467	38	22	0	.633
Duke	8	22	0	.267	29	27	0	.518

Atlantic Sun Conference
	Conf				Overall			
Team	W	L	T	Pct	W	L	T	Pct
Florida Gulf Coast	25	5	0	.833	38	20	0	.655
x–Mercer	16	11	0	.571	38	24	0	.613
East Tennessee State	15	12	0	.556	32	28	0	.533
North Florida	14	12	0	.538	30	28	0	.517
Jacksonville	14	12	0	.538	27	29	0	.482
Stetson	14	13	0	.519	27	31	0	.466
Belmont	13	13	0	.500	27	27	0	.500
Kennesaw State	12	15	0	.444	23	32	0	.418
Lipscomb	9	17	0	.321	19	36	0	.346
Campbell	8	19	0	.296	28	27	0	.509
South Carolina Upstate	8	19	0	.296	19	37	0	.339

Big East Conference
	Conf				Overall			
Team	W	L	T	Pct	W	L	T	Pct
y–Louisville	21	6	0	.778	50	14	0	.781
y–Connecticut	20	6	0	.769	48	16	0	.750
Pittsburgh	18	8	0	.692	38	18	0	.679
x–St. John's	16	11	0	.593	43	20	0	.683
South Florida	16	11	0	.593	26	32	0	.448
Rutgers	15	12	0	.556	30	26	0	.536
Cincinnati	13	14	0	.481	29	29	0	.500
West Virginia	10	17	0	.370	27	30	0	.474
Notre Dame	10	17	0	.370	22	32	0	.407
Villanova	9	18	0	.333	29	23	0	.558
Seton Hall	8	19	0	.296	19	30	1	.390
Georgetown	5	22	0	.185	24	31	0	.436

Big South Conference
	Conf				Overall			
Team	W	L	T	Pct	W	L	T	Pct
x–Coastal Carolina	25	0	0	1.000	55	10	0	.846
Liberty	19	8	0	.704	42	19	0	.689
Radford	15	11	0	.577	29	26	0	.527
High Point	15	12	0	.556	31	29	0	.517
VMI	13	14	0	.481	33	22	0	.600
Winthrop	13	14	0	.481	27	30	0	.474
Gardner–Webb	10	17	0	.370	25	30	0	.455
UNC Asheville	10	17	0	.370	17	35	0	.327
Presbyterian	7	20	0	.259	15	39	0	.278
Charleston Southern	6	20	0	.231	17	38	0	.309

Big Ten Conference
	Conf				Overall			
Team	W	L	T	Pct	W	L	T	Pct
x–Minnesota	15	9	0	.625	32	30	0	.516
Michigan	14	10	0	.583	35	22	0	.614
Iowa	13	11	0	.542	30	28	0	.517
Northwestern	13	11	0	.542	24	32	0	.429
Purdue	12	12	0	.500	33	24	0	.579
Indiana	12	12	0	.500	28	27	0	.509
Michigan State	11	13	0	.458	34	19	0	.642
Ohio State	11	13	0	.458	28	23	0	.549
Illinois	10	14	0	.417	26	26	0	.500
Penn State	9	15	0	.375	22	30	0	.423

Big 12 Conference
	Conf				Overall			
Team	W	L	T	Pct	W	L	T	Pct
y–Texas	24	3	0	.889	50	13	0	.794
y–Oklahoma	15	10	0	.600	50	18	0	.735
y–Kansas State	14	12	0	.538	37	22	0	.627
x–Texas A&M	14	12	1	.537	43	21	1	.669
y–Baylor	12	13	0	.480	36	24	0	.600
Texas Tech	13	14	0	.481	28	29	0	.491
Kansas	11	15	1	.423	31	27	1	.534
Missouri	10	16	0	.385	29	26	0	.527
Nebraska	10	17	0	.370	27	27	0	.500
Oklahoma State	8	19	0	.296	29	26	0	.527

Big West Conference
	Conf				Overall			
Team	W	L	T	Pct	W	L	T	Pct
z–Cal State Fullerton	21	3	0	.875	46	18	0	.719
y–UC Irvine	17	7	0	.708	39	21	0	.650
UC Riverside	13	11	0	.542	32	23	0	.582
Pacific	12	12	0	.500	31	23	0	.574
UC Santa Barbara	10	14	0	.417	24	30	0	.444
Cal Poly	10	14	0	.417	23	32	0	.418
Cal State Northridge	9	15	0	.375	29	27	0	.518
UC Davis	9	15	0	.375	26	29	0	.473
Long Beach State	7	17	0	.292	23	32	0	.418

Colonial Athletic Association
	Conf				Overall			
Team	W	L	T	Pct	W	L	T	Pct
James Madison	18	6	0	.750	30	23	0	.566
Georgia State	17	6	1	.729	34	23	1	.595
x–Virginia Commonwealth	16	7	1	.688	34	26	1	.566
North Carolina-Wilmington	13	11	0	.542	33	27	0	.550
George Mason	11	13	0	.458	28	22	0	.560
Old Dominion	11	13	0	.458	24	30	0	.444
Towson	11	13	0	.458	19	36	0	.345
William and Mary	10	14	0	.417	27	24	0	.529
Hofstra	10	14	0	.417	20	28	1	.418
Delaware	9	15	0	.375	27	24	0	.529
Northeastern	5	19	0	.208	13	31	0	.295

2010 Conference USA baseball standings
	Conf.				Overall
Team	W		L	PCT	W		L	PCT
No. 26 Rice ‍†‍‍	17	–	7	.708	40	–	23	.635
Southern Miss ‍‍‡‍	14	–	10	.583	36	–	24	.600
Memphis ‍‍‍	12	–	12	.500	28	–	30	.483
Marshall ‍‍‍	12	–	12	.500	27	–	31	.466
Houston ‍‍‍	11	–	13	.458	25	–	32	.439
East Carolina ‍‍‍	11	–	13	.458	32	–	27	.542
UAB ‍‍‍	11	–	13	.458	28	–	25	.528
UCF ‍‍‍	10	–	14	.417	33	–	22	.600
Tulane ‍‍‍	10	–	14	.417	32	–	24	.571
† – Conference champion ‡ – Tournament champion y – Invited to the 2010 NCAA Division I baseball tournament As of June 30, 2010; Rankings from Collegiate Baseball

Great West Conference
	Conf				Overall			
Team	W	L	T	Pct	W	L	T	Pct
Utah Valley	26	2	0	.929	42	17	0	.712
Northern Colorado	22	6	0	.786	34	24	0	.586
Houston Baptist	15	13	0	.536	28	31	0	.475
New York Tech	15	13	0	.536	26	29	1	.473
North Dakota	13	15	0	.464	19	35	0	.352
Texas–Pan American	9	18	0	.333	22	33	0	.400
New Jersey Tech	9	18	0	.333	13	44	0	.228
Chicago State	2	26	0	.071	4	52	0	.071

Horizon League
	Conf				Overall			
Team	W	L	T	Pct	W	L	T	Pct
Wright State	17	6	0	.739	31	25	0	.554
x–Milwaukee	17	8	0	.680	33	26	0	.559
Illinois-Chicago	15	9	0	.625	24	30	0	.444
Valparaiso	9	10	0	.474	24	32	0	.429
Butler	11	13	0	.458	21	29	0	.420
Youngstown State	9	17	0	.346	22	34	0	.393
Cleveland State	5	20	0	.200	12	43	0	.218

Ivy League
	Conf				Overall			
Team	W	L	T	Pct	W	L	T	Pct
Lou Gehrig Division
Columbia	14	6	0	.700	26	21	0	.553
Pennsylvania	10	10	0	.500	21	20	0	.512
Cornell	9	11	0	.450	18	20	0	.474
Princeton	6	14	0	.300	12	30	0	.286
Red Rolfe Division
x–Dartmouth	13	7	0	.650	27	18	0	.587
Harvard	10	10	0	.500	17	26	0	.395
Brown	10	10	0	.500	13	31	0	.295
Yale	8	12	0	.400	21	22	0	.488

Metro Atlantic Athletic Conference
	Conf				Overall			
Team	W	L	T	Pct	W	L	T	Pct
Canisius	19	5	0	.792	39	21	0	.650
Marist	16	8	0	.667	33	22	0	.600
x–Rider	15	9	0	.625	36	23	0	.610
Manhattan	15	9	0	.625	31	20	0	.608
Siena	13	11	0	.542	27	27	0	.500
Niagara	13	11	0	.542	17	36	0	.321
Fairfield	8	16	0	.333	18	32	0	.360
St. Peter's	6	18	0	.250	18	34	0	.346
Iona	3	21	0	.125	9	40	0	.184

Mid-American Conference
	Conf				Overall			
Team	W	L	T	Pct	W	L	T	Pct
East Division
x–Kent State	18	9	0	.667	39	25	0	.609
Bowling Green	18	9	0	.667	31	23	1	.573
Miami (OH)	13	14	0	.481	28	28	0	.500
Ohio	13	14	0	.481	20	35	0	.364
Buffalo	9	18	0	.333	23	29	0	.442
Akron	3	24	0	.111	21	34	0	.382
West Division
Central Michigan	20	7	0	.741	36	22	0	.621
Toledo	19	8	0	.704	34	22	0	.607
Ball State	19	8	0	.704	29	29	0	.500
Eastern Michigan	13	14	0	.481	27	32	0	.458
Northern Illinois	12	15	0	.444	24	31	0	.436
Western Michigan	5	22	0	.185	12	42	0	.222

Mid-Eastern Athletic Conference
	Conf				Overall			
Team	W	L	T	Pct	W	L	T	Pct
x–Bethune–Cookman	18	0	0	1.000	35	22	0	.614
North Carolina A&T	15	3	0	.833	31	26	0	.544
Norfolk State	9	9	0	.500	21	29	1	.422
Delaware State	8	10	0	.444	13	36	0	.265
Coppin State	7	11	0	.389	14	33	0	.298
Florida A&M	3	15	0	.167	10	31	1	.250
Maryland-Eastern Shore	3	15	0	.167	8	43	0	.157

Missouri Valley Conference
	Conf				Overall			
Team	W	L	T	Pct	W	L	T	Pct
Wichita State	15	6	0	.714	41	19	0	.683
x–Illinois State	15	6	0	.714	32	23	0	.582
Indiana State	10	10	0	.500	35	19	0	.648
Southern Illinois	10	10	0	.500	28	29	0	.491
Evansville	10	11	0	.476	32	27	0	.542
Creighton	9	12	0	.429	27	25	0	.519
Bradley	8	13	0	.381	20	32	0	.385
Missouri State	6	15	0	.286	21	34	0	.382

Mountain West Conference
	Conf				Overall			
Team	W	L	T	Pct	W	L	T	Pct
x–Texas Christian	19	5	0	.792	54	14	0	.794
y–New Mexico	14	8	0	.636	38	22	0	.633
San Diego State	13	11	0	.542	28	28	0	.500
Brigham Young	12	12	0	.500	27	31	0	.466
Nevada-Las Vegas	11	13	0	.458	29	29	0	.500
Utah	10	13	0	.435	23	28	0	.451
Air Force	3	20	0	.130	13	42	0	.236

Northeast Conference
	Conf				Overall			
Team	W	L	T	Pct	W	L	T	Pct
Bryant	25	7	0	.781	34	22	0	.607
Sacred Heart	20	12	0	.625	31	27	0	.534
x–Central Connecticut State	18	14	0	.563	33	23	0	.589
Wagner	17	15	0	.531	26	31	0	.456
Monmouth	15	17	0	.469	22	27	0	.449
Mount St. Mary's	14	18	0	.438	20	31	0	.392
Quinnipiac	13	19	0	.406	14	39	0	.264
Fairleigh Dickinson	11	21	0	.344	16	38	0	.296
Long Island	11	21	0	.344	14	42	0	.250

Ohio Valley Conference
	Conf				Overall			
Team	W	L	T	Pct	W	L	T	Pct
Tennessee Tech	14	6	0	.700	31	25	0	.554
x–Jacksonville State	15	8	0	.652	32	26	0	.552
Murray State	12	8	1	.595	28	28	1	.500
Southeast Missouri State	13	9	0	.591	30	25	0	.545
Eastern Illinois	11	12	0	.478	18	35	0	.340
Eastern Kentucky	9	12	0	.429	28	27	0	.509
Austin Peay	8	13	0	.381	28	25	0	.528
Morehead State	6	12	1	.342	24	25	1	.490
Tennessee–Martin	8	16	0	.333	24	31	0	.436

Pacific-10 Conference
	Conf				Overall			
Team	W	L	T	Pct	W	L	T	Pct
z–Arizona State	20	7	0	.741	52	10	0	.839
y–UCLA	18	9	0	.667	51	16	0	.761
y–Washington State	15	12	0	.556	37	22	0	.627
y–Stanford	14	13	0	.519	31	25	0	.554
y–Oregon	13	14	0	.481	40	24	0	.625
y–California	13	14	0	.481	29	25	0	.537
y–Arizona	12	15	0	.444	34	24	0	.586
y–Oregon State	12	15	0	.444	32	24	0	.571
Washington	11	16	0	.407	28	28	0	.500
USC	7	20	0	.259	28	32	0	.467

Patriot League
	Conf				Overall			
Team	W	L	T	Pct	W	L	T	Pct
Army	16	4	0	.800	28	17	0	.622
Lehigh	12	8	0	.600	23	27	0	.460
Holy Cross	10	10	0	.500	26	26	0	.500
x–Bucknell	8	12	0	.400	25	35	0	.417
Navy	7	13	0	.350	30	21	0	.588
Lafayette	7	13	0	.350	15	30	0	.333

Southeastern Conference
	Conf				Overall			
Team	W	L	T	Pct	W	L	T	Pct
East Division
y–Florida	22	8	0	.733	47	17	0	.734
y–South Carolina	21	9	0	.700	54	16	0	.771
y–Vanderbilt	16	12	0	.571	46	20	0	.697
Kentucky	13	17	0	.433	31	25	0	.554
Tennessee	12	18	0	.400	30	26	0	.536
Georgia	5	23	0	.179	16	37	0	.302
West Division
y–Auburn	20	10	0	.667	43	21	0	.672
y–Arkansas	18	12	0	.600	43	21	0	.672
y–Ole Miss	16	14	0	.533	39	24	0	.619
y–Alabama	15	15	0	.500	42	25	0	.627
x–LSU	14	16	0	.467	41	22	0	.651
Mississippi State	6	24	0	.200	23	33	0	.411

Southern Conference
	Conf				Overall			
Team	W	L	T	Pct	W	L	T	Pct
x–The Citadel	24	6	0	.800	43	22	0	.662
y–College of Charleston	22	8	0	.733	44	19	0	.698
y–Elon	19	11	0	.633	38	24	0	.613
Georgia Southern	19	11	0	.633	34	24	0	.586
Samford	17	12	0	.586	31	25	0	.554
Western Carolina	16	13	1	.550	37	21	1	.636
Appalachian State	14	14	1	.500	38	18	1	.675
Furman	11	19	0	.367	19	37	0	.339
Wofford	9	21	0	.300	17	38	0	.309
North Carolina-Greensboro	7	23	0	.233	20	33	0	.377
Davidson	5	25	0	.167	19	32	0	.373

Southland Conference
	Conf				Overall			
Team	W	L	T	Pct	W	L	T	Pct
Texas State	23	10	0	.697	38	22	0	.633
Northwestern State	22	10	0	.688	36	21	0	.632
Southeastern Louisiana	21	12	0	.636	40	19	0	.678
Stephen F. Austin	20	12	0	.625	34	20	0	.630
Texas–Arlington	19	14	0	.576	29	31	0	.483
x–Lamar	16	17	0	.485	35	26	0	.574
McNeese State	16	17	0	.485	31	27	0	.534
Nicholls State	15	18	0	.455	27	29	0	.482
Texas-San Antonio	13	20	0	.394	22	28	0	.440
Sam Houston State	11	22	0	.333	19	36	0	.345
Texas A&M-Corpus Christi	10	22	1	.318	20	33	1	.380
Central Arkansas	10	22	1	.318	19	35	1	.355

Southwestern Athletic Conference
	Conf				Overall			
Team	W	L	T	Pct	W	L	T	Pct
Eastern Division
Jackson State	19	6	0	.760	36	17	0	.679
Mississippi Valley State	16	8	0	.667	23	30	0	.434
Alcorn State	15	8	0	.652	27	27	0	.500
Alabama State	6	18	0	.250	13	27	0	.325
Alabama A&M	3	20	0	.130	17	32	0	.347
Western Division
Texas Southern	18	6	0	.750	30	26	0	.536
Southern	17	6	0	.739	24	21	0	.533
x–Grambling State	10	14	0	.417	22	32	0	.407
Arkansas-Pine Bluff	8	16	0	.333	19	32	0	.373
Prairie View A&M	6	17	0	.261	12	35	0	.255

Summit League
	Conf				Overall			
Team	W	L	T	Pct	W	L	T	Pct
South Dakota State	19	9	0	.679	39	21	0	.650
x–Oral Roberts	19	9	0	.679	36	27	0	.571
Centenary	17	9	0	.654	28	26	0	.519
Oakland	13	14	0	.481	23	34	0	.404
IPFW	13	15	0	.464	17	38	0	.309
North Dakota State	11	16	0	.407	22	30	0	.423
Southern Utah	11	16	0	.407	18	36	0	.333
Western Illinois	6	21	0	.222	14	39	0	.264

Sun Belt Conference
	Conf				Overall			
Team	W	L	T	Pct	W	L	T	Pct
y–Louisiana-Lafayette	21	9	0	.700	38	22	0	.633
y–Florida Atlantic	21	9	0	.700	37	24	0	.607
Middle Tennessee State	18	12	0	.600	35	23	0	.603
x–Florida International	17	13	0	.567	36	25	0	.590
South Alabama	17	13	0	.567	32	27	0	.542
Western Kentucky	16	14	0	.533	35	23	0	.603
Troy	16	14	0	.533	36	25	0	.590
Arkansas State	16	14	0	.533	30	28	0	.517
Arkansas-Little Rock	12	16	0	.429	29	25	0	.537
Louisiana-Monroe	7	23	0	.233	17	38	0	.309
New Orleans	2	26	0	.071	13	39	0	.250

West Coast Conference
	Conf				Overall			
Team	W	L	T	Pct	W	L	T	Pct
z–San Diego	19	2	0	.905	37	22	0	.627
Portland	14	7	0	.667	34	18	0	.654
Pepperdine	12	9	0	.571	24	30	0	.444
San Francisco	10	11	0	.476	28	28	0	.500
Santa Clara	8	13	0	.381	23	31	0	.426
St. Mary's	8	13	0	.381	19	32	1	.375
Gonzaga	8	13	0	.381	20	36	0	.357
Loyola Marymount	5	16	0	.238	23	33	0	.411

Western Athletic Conference
	Conf				Overall			
Team	W	L	T	Pct	W	L	T	Pct
Fresno State	16	8	0	.667	38	25	0	.603
Nevada	14	9	1	.604	36	22	1	.619
New Mexico State	14	9	1	.604	36	23	1	.608
x–Hawai'i	12	12	0	.500	35	28	0	.556
Louisiana Tech	11	13	0	.458	27	30	0	.474
San Jose State	9	15	0	.375	23	37	0	.383
Sacramento State	7	17	0	.292	18	35	1	.343

Division I Independents
Team	W	L	T	Pct
Longwood	28	20	0	.583
Dallas Baptist	28	27	0	.509
Le Moyne	28	27	0	.509
Savannah State	24	26	0	.480
Cal State Bakersfield	26	30	0	.464
Southern Illinois-Edwardsville	14	38	0	.269
Seattle	11	39	0	.220
North Carolina Central	3	44	0	.064

Key
x–	Won Conference Tournament and Automatic NCAA tournament Bid
y–	At-Large Selection to NCAA tournament
z–	Won Conference Regular season and Automatic NCAA tournament Bid

== Rankings ==
The Pac-10 Conference champion Arizona State Sun Devils (47–8) ended the regular season ranked #1 in the USA Today/ESPN poll while the Virginia Cavaliers (47–11) finished #1 in the Baseball America poll. Preseason #1 Texas stumbled to an 0–3 Big 12 Tournament record to drop to #3 in both final polls. South Carolina finished the season as a unanimous #1 after winning its first College World Series.

== Postseason ==
The 2010 NCAA Division I baseball tournament began on June 4, 2010. 64 teams qualified for the tournament. The following teams earned Top 8 National Seeds:

1. Arizona State (47–8)
2. Texas (46–11) — Eliminated in Super Regional
3. Florida (42–15)
4. Coastal Carolina (51–7) — Eliminated in Super Regional
5. Virginia (47–11) — Eliminated in Super Regional
6. UCLA (43–13)
7. Louisville (48–12) — Eliminated in Regional
8. Georgia Tech (45–13) — Eliminated in Regional

Atlantic Sun Conference champions Mercer earned their first appearance in the NCAA tournament while New Mexico earned their first appearance since 1962.

== College World Series ==
The 2010 season marked the sixty fourth NCAA baseball tournament, which culminated with the eight team College World Series. The College World Series was held in Omaha, Nebraska, and for the last time was played at Johnny Rosenblatt Stadium. The eight teams played a double-elimination format, with South Carolina claiming their first championship with a two games to none series win over UCLA in the final.

=== Bracket ===
First round
Florida State	1
TCU	8
6	UCLA	11
3	Florida	3
3	Florida	5
Florida State	8
South Carolina	3
Oklahoma	4
Clemson	6
1	Arizona State	3
1	Arizona State	4
South Carolina	11

Second round
TCU	3
6	UCLA	6
Florida State	7
TCU	11
Oklahoma	4
Clemson	6
South Carolina	3^{12}
Oklahoma	2

Semifinals
6	UCLA	2	10
TCU	6	3
Clemson	1	3
South Carolina	5	4

Finals
6	UCLA	1	1	–
South Carolina	7	2^{11}	–

== Award winners ==
=== Major player of the year awards ===
- Dick Howser Trophy: Anthony Rendon, Rice
- Baseball America: Anthony Rendon, Rice
- Collegiate Baseball: Chris Sale, Florida Gulf Coast
- American Baseball Coaches Association: Anthony Rendon, Rice
- Golden Spikes Award Bryce Harper, Southern Nevada

=== Major coach of the year awards ===
- American Baseball Coaches Association: Ray Tanner, South Carolina
- Baseball America: Ray Tanner, South Carolina
- Collegiate Baseball Coach of the Year: Ray Tanner, South Carolina

=== Other major awards ===
- Johnny Bench Award (Catcher of the Year): Bryan Holaday, TCU
- Baseball America Freshman Of The Year: Matt Purke, TCU
