= Evan Marzilli =

American baseball player

- Center fielder
- Born: March 13, 1991 (age 34); Fall River, Massachusetts
- Bats: Left Throws: Left
- Stats at Baseball Reference

Evan Daniel Marzilli (born March 13, 1991) is an American former professional baseball center fielder. He was drafted by the Arizona Diamondbacks in the 8th round of the 2012 Major League Baseball draft.

== Amateur career ==
Marzilli attended Bishop Hendricken High School in Warwick, Rhode Island, graduating in 2009. He enrolled at the University of South Carolina to play college baseball for the South Carolina Gamecocks. In 2011, he played collegiate summer baseball with the Chatham Anglers of the Cape Cod Baseball League.

== Professional career ==
=== Arizona Diamondbacks ===
The Arizona Diamondbacks selected Marzilli in the eighth round of the 2012 MLB draft. He began his professional career with the Missoula Osprey of the Rookie-level Pioneer League. The Diamondbacks invited Marzilli to spring training in 2016. Marzilli spent 2016 with both the Reno Aces and the Mobile BayBears, where he hit .227 in 123 games. He became a free agent after the 2018 season.

=== Chicago Cubs ===
On December 18, 2018, Marzilli signed a minor league deal with the Chicago Cubs. He was released on March 24, 2019.

=== Gary SouthShore RailCats ===
On April 19, 2019, Marzilli signed with the Gary SouthShore RailCats of the American Association of Independent Professional Baseball.

=== Arizona Diamondbacks (second stint) ===
On July 7, 2019, Marzilli's contract was purchased by the Arizona Diamondbacks organization. In 22 games split between the Double–A Jackson Generals and Triple–A Reno Aces, he slashed .123/.286/.193 with one home run and three RBI. Marzilli elected free agency following the season on November 4.

=== Eastern Reyes del Tigre ===
On February 21, 2020. Marzilli signed with the Sugar Land Skeeters of the Atlantic League of Professional Baseball. However, the ALPB season was later canceled due to the COVID-19 pandemic. Marzili stayed in Sugar Land and later signed on to play for the Eastern Reyes del Tigre of the Constellation Energy League (a makeshift four-team independent league created as a result of the pandemic) for the 2020 season. He was subsequently named to the league's all-star team.

== Coaching career ==
In September 2020, Marzilli joined the Metropolitan State University of Denver as an assistant coach, a position which he held through January 2021.
