= Mitch Gaspard =

American baseball coach (born 1965)

Biographical details
- Born: May 26, 1965 (age 61); Port Arthur, Texas, U.S.

Playing career
- 1984–1985: LSU
- 1986–1987: Houston
- Position: Second Baseman

Coaching career (HC unless noted)
- 1988: Houston (Asst.)
- 1989–1992: Louisiana–Lafayette (Asst.)
- 1993–1994: Northwestern State (Asst.)
- 1995–2001: Alabama (Asst.)
- 2002–2007: Northwestern State
- 2008–2009: Alabama (Asst.)
- 2010–2016: Alabama
- 2017–2018: Kansas State (Assoc. HC)
- 2019: Georgia (H/IF)
- 2020–2024: Louisiana Tech (H/RC)

Head coaching record
- Overall: 441–331 (.571)

Accomplishments and honors

Championships
- 2 Southland regular season (2002, 2005)

Awards
- Southland Coach of the Year (2005)

Mitch Gaspard (born May 26, 1965) is an American college baseball coach and former second baseman. He is the hitting coach and recruiting coordinator at Louisiana Tech University. Gaspard played college baseball at Louisiana State University from 1984 to 1985 before transferring to the University of Houston where he played from 1986 to 1987. He is the former head coach of the Alabama Crimson Tide baseball team. Gaspard agreed to a 3-year contract on September 1, 2009, starting in 2010. The 2010 season was Gaspard's first season as the head coach of the Crimson Tide. He had been on the Alabama coaching staff for ten years, and was given the head coaching position when Jim Wells retired. He resigned from Alabama on May 30, 2016.

== Playing career ==
An all-state shortstop at Jefferson High School in Port Arthur, Texas, Gaspard led his team to the Texas state title as a senior and then became the starting second baseman in 1985 for the first Skip Bertman-coached LSU team to advance to NCAA Regional play. He played his final two collegiate seasons as a starter at second for the University of Houston, where he became an assistant coach in 1988.

== Coaching career ==
Gaspard was an assistant coach at Louisiana-Lafayette from 1989 to 1992, helping the "Ragin' Cajuns" reach three NCAA Regionals and win three conference titles. In 2009, Gaspard completed his second season as the Tide's assistant coach and recruiting coordinator. He returned for his second stint with the Crimson Tide in 2008 after six years as head coach at Northwestern State in Natchitoches, Louisiana, where he compiled a 211–128 (.622) record. During those six years, he led the Demons to a pair of Southland Conference championships, one SLC Tournament championship and a place in the 2005 NCAA Baton Rouge Regional. In 20 years of coaching, Gaspard has worked with teams that have won eight conference championships, eight conference tournament championships, played in 16 NCAA Regionals and three College World Series berths. Gaspard was a member of Wells' original staff at Alabama in 1995 and was a pivotal figure as an ace recruiter and a shrewd tactician in the remarkable revival of the program. Alabama had four SEC wins in 1994, but after Wells and Gaspard arrived, the Tide won the SEC Tournament in 1995 and was one win away from the College World Series. By the time Gaspard returned to NSU, Alabama had earned six NCAA Regional appearances and three College World Series places, including a national championship game loss to LSU in 1997. In each of his first seven seasons at Alabama, Gaspard helped mold the Tide into one of America's finest defensive units. As the chief recruiter, he helped achieve five successive Top 20 recruiting classes, including three Top 10 finishes in 1997, 1998 and 1999.

Alabama

In Gaspard's first season as Alabama's head coach, the team went 42–25, including reaching the SEC tournament championship game, and winning the NCAA tournament Georgia Tech Regional. He started the 2011 season with a new assistant coach in Andy Phillips.

In Gaspard's second season at Alabama, his team would go 35–28 (14–16 SEC). His team would go 1–2 in the 2011 SEC Baseball Tournament then they would make the 2011 NCAA Baseball Tournament losing to Florida State 11–1 in the Tallahassee Regional Championship Game.

In Gaspard's third season, his team would struggle early and would not get better in Southeastern Conference play. His young team would finish 21–34 (9–21 SEC) and miss the 2012 NCAA Baseball Tournament.

In Gaspard's fourth year, his team would finish the season 35–28 (14–15 SEC). His team would have wins against then ranked #2 LSU, #1 Vanderbilt and #9 Arkansas. In the 2013 Southeastern Conference Tournament they would beat Auburn 6–3, lose to LSU 3–0, beat Ole Miss 7–5, and in the quarterfinals they would lose a heartbreaker to LSU 3–2. They would get an invitation to play in the 2013 NCAA Baseball Tournament. They would go 1–2 and lose to Troy 9–8 in the semifinals. On May, 30 Mitch Gaspard resigned as Alabama's baseball coach.

Kansas State

Gaspard was the assistant coach at Kansas State for two seasons (2017 and 2018). Kansas State missed the postseason in both of Gaspard's two seasons with the team.

Georgia

In 2018, Gaspard was hired by the Georgia Bulldogs as a volunteer coach.

Louisiana Tech

Gaspard joined the Louisiana Tech coaching staff in the summer of 2019 and served five seasons with the Bulldogs, most recently as associate head coach. During his tenure, Louisiana Tech won three Conference USA titles and reached the NCAA tournament in 2021, 2022 and 2024. Gaspard announced his retirement from coaching on July 3, 2024.

== Head coaching record ==
Record table
Season	Team	Overall	Conference	Standing	Postseason
Northwestern State Demons (Southland Conference) (2002–2007)
2002	Northwestern State	43–17	17–10	T–1st	
2003	Northwestern State	35–22	16–11	4th	
2004	Northwestern State	33–23	16–9	2nd	
2005	Northwestern State	41–20	22–5	1st	NCAA Regional
2006	Northwestern State	33–28	15–15	6th	
2007	Northwestern State	25–28	15–14	4th (East)	
Northwestern State:		210–138	101–64		
Alabama Crimson Tide (Southeastern Conference) (2010–2016)
2010	Alabama	42–25	15–15	4th (West)	NCAA Super Regional
2011	Alabama	35–28	14–16	T–2nd (West)	NCAA Regional
2012	Alabama	21–34	9–21	6th (West)	
2013	Alabama	35–28	14–15	5th (West)	NCAA Regional
2014	Alabama	37–24	15–14	5th (West)	NCAA Regional
2015	Alabama	32–28	12–18	6th (West)	
2016	Alabama	32–26	15–15	5th (West)	
Alabama:		234–193	94–114		
Total:		444–331			
National champion Postseason invitational champion Conference regular season champion Conference regular season and conference tournament champion Division regular season champion Division regular season and conference tournament champion Conference tournament champion
