= 2010 LSU Tigers baseball team =

American college baseball season

2010 LSU Tigers baseball

SEC Tournament champions
- Conference: Southeastern Conference
- West
- Record: 41–22 (14–16 SEC)
- Head coach: Paul Mainieri
- Hitting coach: Javi Sanchez
- Pitching coach: David Grewe
- Home stadium: Alex Box Stadium

2010 Southeastern Conference baseball standings
	Conf.				Overall
Team	W		L	PCT	W		L	PCT
Eastern
No. 7 Florida ^{x}‍†‍‍^{y}	22	–	8	.733	47	–	17	.734
No. 1 South Carolina ‍‍‍^{y}	21	–	9	.700	54	–	16	.771
No. 14 Vanderbilt ‍‍‍^{y}	16	–	12	.571	46	–	20	.697
Kentucky ‍‍‍	13	–	17	.433	31	–	25	.554
Tennessee ‍‍‍	12	–	18	.400	30	–	26	.536
Georgia ‍‍‍	5	–	23	.179	16	–	37	.302
Western
No. 19 Auburn ^{x}‍‍‍^{y}	20	–	10	.667	43	–	21	.672
No. 13 Arkansas ‍‍‍^{y}	18	–	12	.600	43	–	21	.672
Ole Miss ‍‍‍^{y}	16	–	14	.533	39	–	24	.619
No. 16 Alabama ‍‍‍^{y}	15	–	15	.500	42	–	25	.627
LSU ‍‍‡‍^{y}	14	–	16	.467	41	–	22	.651
Mississippi State ‍‍‍	6	–	24	.200	23	–	33	.411
x – Division champion † – Conference champion ‡ – Tournament champion y – Invited to the NCAA tournament As of June 29, 2010; Rankings from Baseball America

The 2010 LSU Tigers baseball team represented Louisiana State University in the NCAA Division I baseball season of 2010. The Tigers played their home games in the new Alex Box Stadium which opened in 2009.

The team was coached by Paul Mainieri who was in his fourth season at LSU. In his first year at LSU, Mainieri's team posted a 29–26–1 record and failed to make the SEC tournament or the NCAA tournament, but the Tigers showed great promise during his second year posting a 49–19–1 record while claiming the SEC Western Division Title, SEC Baseball Tournament championship, and earned the No. 7 National Seed for the 2008 NCAA tournament.

During his third season, the Tigers were ranked No. 1 in multiple pre-season polls and lived up to the hype. The 2009 LSU Tiger baseball team finished the season 56–17, claiming the SEC regular season title, the SEC Tournament Title, and won the 2009 College World Series to claim the programs 6th National Title.

== Previous season ==
Paul Mainieri completed his third season as head coach at LSU in 2009. The Tigers won the SEC West division title and the overall SEC regular season title which earned them the No. 1 seed in the 2009 SEC baseball tournament. The Tigers would go on to win the tournament and secure a spot in the NCAA post-season.

After winning the SEC Tournament, it was announced that LSU was selected as a host site for the 2009 NCAA tournament for the 19th time in the history of the program and for the second consecutive season. When the full NCAA tournament bracket was released, LSU was awarded the No. 3 national seed in the tournament, guaranteeing them home field advantage throughout the Super Regionals as long as they won the Regional round. LSU was able to sweep the Baton Rouge regional, defeating Southern, Baylor, and Minnesota to secure a spot in the Super Regional round.

Rice won the Houston, TX regional and moved on to the Super Regional to face LSU. LSU continued their winning streak sweeping Rice by the scores of 12–9 and 5–3. The Tigers celebrated the school's 15th trip to the College World Series in what was the final game in the inaugural season of the "new" Alex Box Stadium.

LSU faced Virginia in the first game of the 2009 College World Series. LSU defeated the Cavaliers by a score of 9–5, marking LSU's first opening round win in the College World Series since 2000. In the second game, LSU faced a familiar foe, the Arkansas Razorbacks. LSU dominated the game from start to finish winning 9–1. LSU was 1 game away from making their first trip to the CWS championship since the format changed to a best of 3 series. The Tigers once again faced the Razorbacks, and once again dominated the game. The Tigers sent the Razorbacks home after winning 14–5.

The Tigers were matched up against the Texas Longhorns in the best of 3 series for the national championship. LSU won the first game 7–6, but it took 11 innings for the Tigers to earn the Victory. Texas came back in game 2 and completely dominated the game, defeating the Tigers 5–1. Game 3 set the stage for a winner take all, and the Tigers were ready for the challenge. LSU won the game 11–4 and claimed the 6th national title on school history.

The 2009 squad compiled and overall record of 56–17, including a 10–1 mark in NCAA post-season play.

== Pre-season ==
=== 2009 Recruiting Class ===
2009 Recruits
Name	Hometown	School	Height	Weight	Bats	Throws
Joey Bourgeois; P	Paulina, LA	LSU-Eunice/Lutcher High School	6'2"	220	R	R
Brody Colvin; P	Lafayette, LA	St. Thomas More High School	6'3"	195	R	R
Brody Colvin; P	Drafted: 227th overall in Round 7 by the Phillies. Signed August 17, 2009.					
Alex Edward; INF/OF	Baton Rouge, LA	Parkview Baptist High School	6'1"	190	R	R
Forrest Garrett; P	Norcross, GA	Norcross High School	6'3"	180	L	L
Forrest Garrett; P	Drafted: 1234th overall in Round 41 by the Rangers					
Mason Katz; UTIL	Harahan, LA	Jesuit High School	5'10"	185	R	R
Kyle Koeneman; INF	Seymour, TN	Walters State Junior College/Seymour High School	6'0"	225	R	R
Zach LaSuzzo; P	Monroe, LA	St. Frederick High School	6'0"	195	L	L
Mike Lowery; INF	Pearland, TX	Temple Junior College/Pearland High School	6'3"	185	L	R
Wes Luquette; C	New Orleans, LA	Newman High School	6'0"	200	R	R
Wes Luquette; C	Drafted: 805th overall in Round 27 by the Pirates					
Mitch Mormann; P	Manchester, IA	Des Moines Community College/West Delaware High School	6'6"	230	R	R
Mitch Mormann; P	Drafted: 597th overall in Round 20 by the Giants					
Mike Reed; P	Houston, TX	Stratford High School	6'2"	190	R	R
Jordan Rittiner; P	Metairie, LA	Jesuit High School	6'2"	195	L	L
Edmond Sparks; C	Hampton, GA	Chipola Junior College/Lovejoy High School	5'11"	205	R	R
Zach Von Rosenberg; P	Zachary, LA	Zachary High School	6'5"	205	R	R
Zach Von Rosenberg; P	Drafted: 175th overall in Round 6 by the Pirates. Signed August 10, 2009.					
Trey Watkins; OF	Montz, LA	LSU-Eunice/Destrehan High School	5'9"	190	R	R

=== Key Losses ===
- Louis Coleman, P Drafted in Round 5 of the 2009 MLB Draft by the Kansas City Royals
- Chad Jones, P/OF Opted to enter the 2010 NFL draft
- D. J. LeMahieu, INF Drafted in Round 2 of the 2009 MLB Draft by the Chicago Cubs
- Jared Mitchell, OF Drafted in Round 1 of the 2009 MLB Draft by the Chicago White Sox
- Sean Ochinko, C/INF Drafted in Round 10 of the 2009 MLB Draft by the Toronto Blue Jays
- Ryan Schimpf, INF/OF Drafted in Round 5 of the 2009 MLB Draft by the Toronto Blue Jays

== Personnel ==
=== 2010 roster ===
2010 LSU Tigers baseball roster
Pitchers: 10 Shane Riedie – Sophomore; 12 Austin Ross – Junior; 18 Mike Reed – Freshman; 22 Matty Ott – Sophomore; 23 Anthony Ranaudo – Junior; 24 Daniel Bradshaw – Junior; 25 Joey Bourgeois – Sophomore; 28 Forrest Garrett – Freshman; 29 Jordan Rittiner – Freshman; 30 Chris Matulis – Sophomore; 32 Zach LaSuzzo – Freshman; 44 Paul Bertuccini – Senior; 45 Mitch Mormann – Junior; 47 Ben Alsup – Junior	Catchers: 14 Wes Luquette – Freshman; 33 Micah Gibbs – Junior	Infielders: 7 Grant Dozar – Sophomore; 9 Wet Delatte – (redshirt) Freshman; 11 Tyler Hanover – Sophomore; 13 Alex Edward – Freshman; 16 Matt Fury – (redshirt) Freshman; 17 Mike Lowery – Junior; 27 Beau Didier – (redshirt) Freshman; 35 Matt Gaudet – Senior; 36 Austin Nola – Sophomore; 38 Kyle Koneman – Junior; Utility: 5 Mason Katz – Freshman	Outfielders: 3 Trey Watkins – Sophomore; 6 Leon Landry – Junior; 8 Mikie Mahtook – Sophomore; 21 Johnny Dishon – (redshirt) Sophomore; 34 Blake Dean – Senior

2010 LSU Tigers Baseball Roster & Bios http://www.lsusports.net/SportSelect.dbml?SPSID=27867&SPID=2173&DB_LANG=C&DB_OEM_ID=5200&SORT_ORDER=7&Q_SEASON=2009

=== Coaching staff ===
2010 LSU Tigers baseball coaching staff
- Paul Mainieri – Head coach – 3 years at LSU
- David Grewe – Associate head coach, Pitching Coach, Recruiting coordinator – 1 year
- Javi Sanchez – Assistant coach, Hitting Coach – 2 years
- Will Davis – Volunteer assistant coach, Outfielders Coach – 2 years
- Buzzy Haydel – Undergraduate Assistant – 0 years
- Ross Brezovsky – Coordinator of Baseball Operations – 1 year

2010 LSU Tigers Baseball Coaches & Bios http://www.lsusports.net/SportSelect.dbml?&DB_OEM_ID=5200&SPID=2173&SPSID=28707

== Schedule/Results ==
2010 LSU Tigers baseball game log

Regular season

February
#	Date	Opponent	Site/stadium	Score	Win	Loss	Save	Attendance	Overall record	SEC record
1	February 19	Centenary	Alex Box Stadium	5–4	Bradshaw (1–0)	Tromblee (0–1)	Ott (1)	11,588	1–0	–
2	February 20	Centenary	Alex Box Stadium	25–8	Ross (1–0)	Kraft (0–1)	None	11,126	2–0	–
3	February 21	Centenary	Alex Box Stadium	4–0	Bourgeois (1–0)	Benson (0–1)	None	10,262	3–0	–
4	February 24	McNeese St.	Alex Box Stadium	2–1	Matulis (1–0)	Butler (0–1)	Ott (2)	9,801	4–0	–
5	February 27	William & Mary	Alex Box Stadium	10–9	Mormann (1–0)	Farrell (0–1)	Ott (3)	5,966	5–0	–
6	February 28	William & Mary	Alex Box Stadium	9–6	Bradshaw (2–0)	Sarrett (0–1)	Ott (4)	6,686	6–0	–
7	February 28	William & Mary	Alex Box Stadium	7–4	Rittiner (1–0)	Goodloe (1–1)	Reed (1)	6,686	7–0	–

March
#	Date	Opponent	Site/stadium	Score	Win	Loss	Save	Attendance	Overall record	SEC record
8	March 4	Pepperdine	Alex Box Stadium	8–1	Matulis (2–0)	Cook (0–2)	None	9,974	8–0	–
9	March 5	Brown	Alex Box Stadium	13–7	Ross (2–0)	Weidig (0–1)	None	10,165	9–0	–
10	March 6	Pepperdine	Alex Box Stadium	3–2	Bourgeois (2–0)	Bywater (1–1)	Ott (5)	11,220	10–0	–
11	March 7	Brown	Alex Box Stadium	9–2	Rittiner (2–0)	Wilcox (0–1)	None	10,401	11–0	–
12	March 9	UL-Monroe	Alex Box Stadium	18–7	Alsup (1–0)	Brown (0–2)	None	9,659	12–0	–
13	March 12	Kansas	Alex Box Stadium	9–11	Walz (3–1)	Bourgeois (2–1)	Bochy (2)	11,157	12–1	–
14	March 13	Kansas	Alex Box Stadium	4–2	Ross (3–0)	Bollman (1–2)	Ott (6)	10,667	13–1	–
15	March 14	Kansas	Alex Box Stadium	4–8	Selik (4–0)	Rittiner (2–1)	Bochy (3)	11,074	13–2	–
16	March 17	Nicholls St.	Alex Box Stadium	10–3	Bradshaw (3–0)	Cooper (2–1)	None	10,646	14–2	–
17	March 19	Arkansas	Alex Box Stadium	3–6	Bolsinger (3–0)	Ross (2–1)	None	11,225	14–3	0–1
18	March 20	Arkansas	Alex Box Stadium	8–7	Bradshaw (4–0)	Davenport (2–2)	Ott (7)	10,944	15–3	1–1
19	March 21	Arkansas	Alex Box Stadium	5–1	Matulis (3–0)	Eibner	None	10,168	16–3	2–1
20	March 24	UL-Lafayette	Alex Box Stadium	4–3	Mormann (2–0)	Marze (1–2)	Ott (8)	10,857	17–3	2–1
21	March 26	Tennessee	Lindsey Nelson Stadium	6–2	Ross (3–1)	Morgado (2–2)	None	1,647	18–3	3–1
22	March 27	Tennessee	Lindsey Nelson Stadium	10–6	Matulis (4–0)	McCray (2–3)	None	2,490	19–3	4–1
23	March 27	Tennessee	Lindsey Nelson Stadium	8–6	Bourgeois (3–1)	Gruver (1–1)	Ott (9)	1,394	20–3	5–1
24	March 31	Binghamton	Alex Box Stadium	13–7	Mormann (3–0)	Rogers (1–1)	None	10,548	21–3	5–1

April
#	Date	Opponent	Site/stadium	Score	Win	Loss	Save	Attendance	Overall record	SEC record
25	April 2	Georgia	Alex Box Stadium	4–3	Matulis (5–0)	Grimm (2–3)	Ott (10)	11,010	22–3	6–1
26	April 3	Georgia	Alex Box Stadium	6–12	Walters (1–2)	Ross (3–2)	None	10,835	22–4	6–2
27	April 4	Georgia	Alex Box Stadium	15–5	Rittiner (3–1)	Palazzone (3–3)	None	10,021	23–4	7–2
28	April 6	Alcorn St.	Alex Box Stadium	17–5	Alsup (2–0)	Williams (1–3)	LaSuzzo (1)	9,720	24–4	7–2
29	April 7	Southern Miss	Zephyr Field	6–5 ^{12}	Cotton (1–0)	Jones (0–1)	None	9,370	25–4	7–2
30	April 9	Auburn	Samford Stadium	14–10	Ranaudo (1–0)	Nelson (4–2)	Cotton (1)	3,751	26–4	8–2
31	April 10	Auburn	Samford Stadium	7–11	Ray (2–1)	Matulis (5–1)	None	3,274	26–5	8–3
32	April 11	Auburn	Samford Stadium	5–6	Hubbard (3–1)	Ross (3–3)	None	3,130	26–6	8–4
33	April 14	Tulane	Alex Box Stadium	10–4	Cotton (2–0)	Byo (1–1)	None	10,682	27–6	8–4
34	April 16	Alabama	Alex Box Stadium	12–5	Ranaudo (2–0)	Morgan (4–2)	Rittiner (2)	11,332	28–6	9–4
35	April 17	Alabama	Alex Box Stadium	9–7	Bourgeois (4–1)	White (3–3)	Ott (11)	12,313	29–6	10–4
36	April 18	Alabama	Alex Box Stadium	6–5 ^{14}	Ott 1–0)	Kilcrease (2–1)	None	10,744	30–6	11–4
37	April 20	Northwestern St.	Fair Grounds Field	14–3	Bradshaw (5–0)	Irvine (4–3)	None	5,212	31–6	11–4
38	April 21	Northwestern St.	Alex Box Stadium	8–6	Rittiner (4–1)	Hennigan (1–2)	Ross (1)	10,509	32–6	11–4
39	April 24	Ole Miss	Oxford-University Stadium	9–11	McKean (3–1)	Ranaudo (2–1)	Huber (5)	10,022	32–7	11–5
40	April 24	Ole Miss	Oxford-University Stadium	8–9 ^{11}	Crouse (4–1)	Ott (1–1)	None	8,236	32–8	11–6
41	April 25	Ole Miss	Oxford-University Stadium	6–7	Huber (1–0)	Ross (3–4)	None	8,783	32–9	11–7
42	April 27	New Orleans	Alex Box Stadium	4–7	Mattson (3–1)	Rittiner (4–2)	Berry (1)	10,584	32–10	11–7
43	April 30	Florida	McKethan Stadium	5–8	Panteliodis (7–2)	Ranaudo (2–2)	Chapman (8)	4,213	32–12	11–9

May
#	Date	Opponent	Site/stadium	Score	Win	Loss	Save	Attendance	Overall record	SEC record
44	May 1	Florida	McKethan Stadium	3–7	Randall (5–3)	Matulis (5–2)	None	4,003	32–11	11–8
45	May 2	Florida	McKethan Stadium	6–13	Johnson (4–2)	Ott (1–2)	None	3,617	32–13	11–10
46	May 4	Southeastern LA	Alex Box Stadium	9–5	Alsup (3–0)	Janway (3–1)	None	10,692	33–13	11–10
47	May 7	Vanderbilt	Alex Box Stadium	16–15 ^{10}	Ott (2–2)	Brewer (1–2)	None	10,640	34–13	12–10
48	May 8	Vanderbilt	Alex Box Stadium	2–6	Hill (5–3)	Rittiner (4–3)	None	10,909	34–14	12–11
49	May 9	Vanderbilt	Alex Box Stadium	3–4	Armstrong (6–1)	Ott (2–3)	Gray (1)	10,304	34–15	12–12
50	May 14	Kentucky	Cliff Hagan Stadium	9–11	Kapteyn (2–0)	Ott (2–4)'	None	2,148	34–16	12–13
51	May 15	Kentucky	Cliff Hagan Stadium	4–9	Cooper (4–4)	Rittiner (4–4)	None	2,279	34–17	12–14
52	May 16	Kentucky	Cliff Hagan Stadium	4–6	Darnell (5–3)	LaSuzzo (0–1)	None	2,061	34–18	12–15
53	May 18	Tulane	Turchin Stadium	1–9	McKenzie (2–1)	Bradshaw (5–1)	None	4,700	34–19	12–15
54	May 20	Mississippi St.	Alex Box Stadium	14–13	Ranaudo (3–2)	Reed (1–7)	None	10,279	35–19	13–15
55	May 21	Mississippi St.	Alex Box Stadium	17–3	Ross (4–4)	Jones (2–4)	None	10,831	36–19	14–15
56	May 22	Mississippi St.	Alex Box Stadium	1–2	Stratton (5–3)	Matulis (5–3)	Graveman (1)	10,743	36–20	14–16

Post-season

SEC tournament
#	Date	Opponent	Site/stadium	Score	Win	Loss	Save	Attendance	Overall record	SECT Record
1	May 26	Florida	Regions Park	10–6	Ranaudo (4–2)	Johnson	None		37–20	1–0
2	May 27	Vanderbilt	Regions Park	7–5	Ross (5–4)	Hill (5–5)	None	12,180	38–20	2–0
3	May 29	Ole Miss	Regions Park	8–0 ^{7}	Alsup (4–0)	McKean (4–2)	None		39–20	3–0
4	May 30	Alabama	Regions Park	4–3 ^{11}	Ranaudo (5–2)	Smith (1–2)	None	13,327	40–20	4–0

NCAA tournament: Regionals
#	Date	Opponent	Site/stadium	Score	Win	Loss	Save	Attendance	Overall record	NCAAT Record
1	June 4	UC Irvine	Jackie Robinson Stadium	11–10 ^{11}	Alsup (5–0)	Pettis (9–4)	None	1,414	41–20	1–0
2	June 5	UCLA	Jackie Robinson Stadium	3–6	Bauer (10–3)	Ranaudo (5–3)	None	2,613	41–21	1–1
3	June 6	UC Irvine	Jackie Robinson Stadium	3–4	Brock (6–4)	Alsup (5–1)	Hoover (1)	1,015	41–22	1–2

*Rankings are based on the team's current ranking in the Baseball America poll the week LSU faced each opponent.

== Rankings ==
Ranking movement
Poll	Pre- season	Feb. 22	Mar. 1	Mar. 8	Mar. 15	Mar. 22	Mar. 29	Apr. 5	Apr. 12	Apr. 19	Apr. 26	May 3	May 10	May 17	May 24	June 1	June 8	Final Poll
USA Today/ESPN Coaches' Poll (Top 25)	2	–	1	1	3	4	4	4	6						NR	23		
Baseball America (Top 25)	3	2	2	2	7	7	5	5	8	8	15	24	NR	NR	NR	23		
Collegiate Baseball (Top 30)^	2	1	1	1	3	4	4	4	7	6	17	NR	NR	NR	NR	21		
NCBWA (Top 30)	2	1	1	1	6	4	4	3	6	5	11	17	20	27	30	23		
Rivals.com (Top 25)	3	2	2	2	8	8	8	7	8	7	10	18	NR	NR	NR	23		

- NR = Not ranked
- ^ Collegiate Baseball ranked 40 teams in their preseason poll, but will only rank 30 teams weekly during the season.

== Awards and honors ==
- Ben Alsup

2010 SEC Tournament All-Tournament Team

- Paul Bertuccini

2010 ESPN The Magazine Academic All-American

- Blake Dean

2010 Collegiate Baseball Newspaper Second Team Pre-Season All-American
2010 Rivals.com Pre-Season All-American
2010 Golden Spikes Award Watch List
2010 SEC Tournament All-Tournament Team

- Matt Gaudet

2010 Second Team All-SEC Selection

- Micah Gibbs

2010 Collegiate Baseball Newspaper Second Team Pre-Season All-American
2010 Baseball America First Team Pre-Season All-American
2010 Golden Spikes Award Watch List
2010 Johnny Bench Award Watchlist
2010 First Team All-SEC Selection
2010 All-SEC Defensive Team Selection
2010 Johnny Bench Award Semifinalist

- Tyler Hanover

2010 SEC Tournament All-Tournament Team

- Leon Landry

2010 Baseball America Third Team Pre-Season All-American
2010 Golden Spikes Award Watch List

- Mikie Mahtook

2010 SEC Tournament All-Tournament Team

- Austin Nola

2010 Second Team All-SEC Selection
2010 SEC Tournament All-Tournament Team
2010 SEC Tournament MVP

- Matty Ott

2010 Collegiate Baseball Newspaper Second Team Pre-Season All-American
2010 Stopper of the Year Watch List
2010 Rivals.com Pre-Season All-American

- Anthony Ranaudo

Collegiate Baseball Newspaper Preseason National Player of the Year
2010 Collegiate Baseball Newspaper First Team Pre-Season All-American
2010 Baseball America First Team Pre-Season All-American
2010 Rivals.com Pre-Season All-American
2010 Golden Spikes Award Watch List
2010 SEC Baseball Service Team

== LSU Tigers in the 2010 Major League Baseball draft ==
The following members and future members (denoted by *) of the LSU Tigers baseball program were drafted in the 2010 MLB draft.

Player	Position	Round	Overall	MLB Team
*Delino DeShields, Jr.	2B	1	8	Houston Astros
*Zach Lee	P	1	28	Los Angeles Dodgers
*Cam Bedrosian	P	1	29	Los Angeles Angels of Anaheim
Anthony Ranaudo	P	Comp A.	39	Boston Red Sox
Micah Gibbs	C	3	97	Chicago Cubs
Leon Landry	OF	3	109	Los Angeles Dodgers
*Garin Cecchini	SS	4	143	Boston Red Sox
*Kevin Gausman	P	6	202	Los Angeles Dodgers
Austin Ross	P	8	249	Milwaukee Brewers
Blake Dean	1B	8	262	Los Angeles Dodgers
*Lucas LeBlanc	OF	11	353	Boston Red Sox
*JaCoby Jones	SS	19	573	Houston Astros
*Austin Southall	OF	19	588	San Francisco Giants
*Ryan Eades	P	19	590	Colorado Rockies
*Mitchell Hopkins	P	12	1267	Cincinnati Reds
Johnny Dishon	OF	42	1269	Milwaukee Brewers
*Tyler Ross	C	46	1401	Philadelphia Phillies
Chad Jones	OF	50	1509	Milwaukee Brewers
