= 2010 Alabama Crimson Tide baseball team =

American college baseball season

2010 Alabama Crimson Tide baseball

Atlanta, GA Regional Champions
- Conference: Southeastern Conference
- West
- Record: 42-25 (15-15 SEC)
- Head coach: Mitch Gaspard (1st season)
- Hitting coach: Dax Norris
- Pitching coach: Kyle Bunn
- Home stadium: Sewell-Thomas Stadium

2010 Southeastern Conference baseball standings
	Conf.				Overall
Team	W		L	PCT	W		L	PCT
Eastern
No. 7 Florida ^{x}‍†‍‍^{y}	22	–	8	.733	47	–	17	.734
No. 1 South Carolina ‍‍‍^{y}	21	–	9	.700	54	–	16	.771
No. 14 Vanderbilt ‍‍‍^{y}	16	–	12	.571	46	–	20	.697
Kentucky ‍‍‍	13	–	17	.433	31	–	25	.554
Tennessee ‍‍‍	12	–	18	.400	30	–	26	.536
Georgia ‍‍‍	5	–	23	.179	16	–	37	.302
Western
No. 19 Auburn ^{x}‍‍‍^{y}	20	–	10	.667	43	–	21	.672
No. 13 Arkansas ‍‍‍^{y}	18	–	12	.600	43	–	21	.672
Ole Miss ‍‍‍^{y}	16	–	14	.533	39	–	24	.619
No. 16 Alabama ‍‍‍^{y}	15	–	15	.500	42	–	25	.627
LSU ‍‍‡‍^{y}	14	–	16	.467	41	–	22	.651
Mississippi State ‍‍‍	6	–	24	.200	23	–	33	.411
x – Division champion † – Conference champion ‡ – Tournament champion y – Invited to the NCAA tournament As of June 29, 2010; Rankings from Baseball America

The 2010 Alabama Crimson Tide Baseball Team represented the University of Alabama in the NCAA Division I baseball season of 2010.

== Synopsis ==
Alabama (42-25, 15–15 SEC) began the season with an eight-game winning streak and matched the school record for the best record (16–1) after 17 games. Alabama then lost 14 of its next 20 games with a record of 22–15 by April 19. Alabama then won five straight games in late April, before losing six of eight games following a 5–4 loss to Mississippi on May 14. Alabama closed the regular season with five straight wins, qualifying .

During post-season play, Alabama participated in the 2010 Southeastern Conference baseball tournament (Alabama's 21st appearance) and the 2010 NCAA Division I baseball tournament. In the SEC tournament, Alabama won 3 games, defeating Auburn, Mississippi, and Florida, advancing to the finals where Alabama lost to LSU 4–3 in 11 innings. In the NCAA tournament, Alabama defeated Elon, Mercer, and Georgia Tech, advancing to the finals where Alabama lost to Clemson.

== Personnel ==
=== 2010 roster ===
2010 Alabama Crimson Tide roster
Pitchers: 7 Brett Whitaker - Junior; 11 Trey Pilkington - Freshman; 18 Adam Scott - Senior; 21 Adam Windsor - Freshman; 23 Tyler White - (redshirt) Sophomore; 24 Matt Taylor - Freshman; 26 Jonathan Smart - (redshirt) Junior; 27 Taylor Wolfe - Freshman; 28 Nathan Killcrease - Junior; 29 Jason Townsend - Junior; 32 Adam Morgan - Sophomore; 33 David Head - Senior; 36 Troy Sutherland - (redshirt) Freshman; 39 James Tullidge - (redshirt) Sophomore; 40 Jimmy Nelson - Junior; 44 Tucker Hawley - Freshman; 46 Kelby Deerman - (redshirt) Freshman	Catchers: 5 Brett Booth - Freshman; 15 Cody Trotter - Senior; 22 Chris Smelley - (redshirt) Junior; 37 Charley Waldrep - Freshman; 41 Brock Bennett - Junior	Infielders: 2 Josh Rutledge - Junior; 3 Ross Wilson - Junior; 14 Jake Smith - Senior; 16 Clay Jones - Senior; 20 Danny Collins - Freshman; 34 John David Smelser - Junior; 35 Josh Sanders - (redshirt) Junior; 38 Cal Tinsley - Senior; 42 Allen Dye - Freshman; Utility: 10 Jon Kelton - (redshirt) Sophomore	Outfielders: 1 Taylor Dugas - Sophomore; 6 Kent Myers - (redshirt) Freshman; 9 Andrew Miller - Freshman; 12 Brandt Hendricks - (redshirt) Freshman; 13 David Kindred - Junior

=== Coaching staff ===
2010 Alabama Crimson Tide baseball coaching staff
- 8 Mitch Gaspard - Head coach - 10 years at Alabama (1st as Head Coach)
- 4 Dax Norris - Assistant coach, Hitting Coach, Recruiting Coordinator - 4 years
- 19 Kyle Bunn - Assistant coach, Pitching Coach - 1st year
- 43 Bobby Barbier - Volunteer Coach - 1st year
- 25 Alex Kubal - Fifth-year student assistant coach
- Drew French - Director of Operations - 3 years

== Schedule/Results ==
2010 Alabama Crimson Tide baseball game log
Regular season
February

#	Date	Opponent	Site/stadium	Score	Win	Loss	Save	Attendance	Overall record	SEC record
1	February 20	South Alabama	Sewell-Thomas Stadium	12–4	A. Morgan (1–0)	J. Bailey (0–1)	None	4,848	1–0	–
2	February 21	South Alabama	Stanky Field	5-3	T. White (1–0)	B. Brown (0–1)	J. Smith (1)	3,273	2–0	–
3	February 26	Illinois-Chicago	Sewell-Thomas Stadium	9–4	N. Kilcrease (1–0)	C. Kovacevich (0–2)	None	3,667	3–0	–
4	February 27	Illinois-Chicago	Sewell-Thomas Stadium	25–1	J. Nelson (1–0)	E. Wyman (0–2)	None	4,577	4–0	–
5	February 27	Illinois-Chicago	Sewell-Thomas Stadium	4–3	B. Whitaker (1–0)	M. Heesch (0–1)	None	4,577	5–0	–

March

#	Date	Opponent	Site/stadium	Score	Win	Loss	Save	Attendance	Overall record	SEC record
–	March 2	Samford	Joe Lee Griffin Stadium	Postponed						
6	March 3†	#25 Georgia	Regions Park	13–2	T. Wolfe (1–0)	C. Hawkins (0–1)	None	792	6–0	–
7	March 5	College of Charleston	Patriots Point	6-2	A. Morgan (2–0)	D. Peterson (1–1)	B. Whitaker (1)	417	7–0	–
8	March 6	College of Charleston	Patriots Point	4–0	J. Nelson (2–0)	C. Powell (2–1)	None	768	8–0	–
9	March 7	College of Charleston	Patriots Point	6–7	T. Schiller (3–0)	J. Smith (0–1)	None	731	8–1	–
–	March 9†	Auburn	Riverwalk Stadium	Postponed						
–	March 10	Michigan State	Sewell-Thomas Stadium	Cancelled						
10	March 12	Stony Brook	Sewell-Thomas Stadium	15–8	T. White (2–0)	T. Johnson (1–1)	None	3,637	9–1	–
11	March 13	Stony Brook	Sewell-Thomas Stadium	5–0	J. Nelson (3–0)	N. Tropeano (1–1)	D. Head (1)	3,623	10–1	–
12	March 13	Stony Brook	Sewell-Thomas Stadium	13–6	T. Wolfe (2–0)	M. Barbot (0–1)	None	3,623	11–1	–
13	March 14	Stony Brook	Sewell-Thomas Stadium	4–3	J. Smart (1–0)	A. Brown (0–2)	T. White (1)	3,540	12–1	–
14	March 16	Minnesota	Sewell-Thomas Stadium	5–4	D. Head (1–0)	T. Ryan (0–1)	None	4,056	13–1	–
15	March 17	Minnesota	Sewell-Thomas Stadium	9–4	A. Windsor (1–0)	S. Fern (1–3)	None	4,044	14–1	–
16	March 19	#19 Vanderbilt	Sewell-Thomas Stadium	4-1	A. Morgan (3–0)	S. Gray (3–2)	B. Whitaker (2)	4,428	15–1	1–0
17	March 20	#19 Vanderbilt	Sewell-Thomas Stadium	8–2	J. Nelson (4–0)	T. Hill (3–1)	None	4,512	16–1	2–0
18	March 21	#19 Vanderbilt	Sewell-Thomas Stadium	4–5	J. Armstrong (3–0)	T. Wolfe (2–1)	R. Brewer (3)	3,541	16–2	2–1
19	March 24†	Auburn	Riverwalk Stadium	6–8	M. Hurst (2–0)	J. Smart (1–1)	A. Hubbard (3)	7,205	16–3	–
20	March 26	#16 Arkansas	Baum Stadium	8–9	T. Forrest (3–0)	B. Whitaker (1–1)	D. Baxendale (6)	8,942	16–4	2–2
21	March 27	#16 Arkansas	Baum Stadium	3–4	J. Pratt (1–0)	T. White (2–2)	None	8,332	16–5	2–3
22	March 28	#16 Arkansas	Baum Stadium	5–10	T. Forrest (4–0)	A. Scott (0–1)	None	7,130	16–6	2–4
23	March 30	Jacksonville State	Sewell-Thomas Stadium	7–3	T. Pilkington (1–0)	K. Elwell (1–2)	None	3,760	17–6	–
24	March 31	UAB	Regions Park	4–6	B. Waite (1–0)	T. Hawley (0–1)	N. Graffeo (3)	2,281	17–7	–

April

#	Date	Opponent	Site/stadium	Score	Win	Loss	Save	Attendance	Overall record	SEC record
25	April 2	Auburn	Sewell-Thomas Stadium	10-5	A. Morgan (4–0)	C. Luckie (1–2)	None	5,112	18–7	3–4
26	April 3	Auburn	Sewell-Thomas Stadium	6–5	J. Townsend (1–0)	A. Hubbard (2–1)	N. Kilcrease (1)	5,306	19–7	4–4
27	April 4	Auburn	Sewell-Thomas Stadium	1-7		T. Wolfe (2–1)		4,350	19–8	4–5
28	April 6	UAB	Sewell-Thomas Stadium	4–11		J. Townsend (1–1)		3,895	19–9	–
29	April 7	Jacksonville State	Rudy Abbott Field	10–4				3,392	20–9	–
30	April 9	Kentucky	Cliff Hagan Stadium	6–7				2,179	20–10	4–6
31	April 10	Kentucky	Cliff Hagan Stadium	2–8				2,098	20–11	4–7
32	April 11	Kentucky	Cliff Hagan Stadium	11–9				1,953	21–11	5–7
33	April 13	Samford	Sewell-Thomas Stadium	5–7				3,819	21–12	–
34	April 14	#23 SE Louisiana	Pat Kennelly Diamond	10–5				2,108	22–12	–
35	April 16	#6 LSU	Alex Box Stadium	5–12				11,332	22–13	5–8
36	April 17	#6 LSU	Alex Box Stadium	7–9				12,313	22–14	5–9
37	April 18	#6 LSU	Alex Box Stadium	5–6				10,744	22–15	5–10
38	April 23	Mississippi State	Sewell-Thomas Stadium	8-5				4,037	23–15	6–10
39	April 24	Mississippi State	Sewell-Thomas Stadium	9–8				4,828	24–15	7–10
40	April 25	Mississippi State	Sewell-Thomas Stadium	6–4				4,828	25–15	8–10
41	April 27	Mississippi Valley State	Sewell-Thomas Stadium	7–4			3,404		26–15	–
42	April 28	Mississippi Valley State	Sewell-Thomas Stadium	5–1				3,453	27–15	–
43	April 30	#3 South Carolina	Carolina Stadium	7–9				8,145	27–16	8–11

May

#	Date	Opponent	Site/stadium	Score	Win	Loss	Save	Attendance	Overall record	SEC record
44	May 1	#3 South Carolina	Carolina Stadium	6–4				8,053	28–16	9–11
45	May 2	#3 South Carolina	Carolina Stadium	15–20				8,006	9–12	
46	May 7	#3 Florida	Sewell-Thomas Stadium	3–9				4,387	28–18	9–13
47	May 8	#3 Florida	Sewell-Thomas Stadium	8–14				4,273	28–19	10–13
48	May 9	#3 Florida	Sewell-Thomas Stadium	10–8				4,317	29–19	10–14
49	May 12	Samford	Joe Lee Griffin Stadium	7-8				1,835	29–20	10–14
50	May 14	#14 Ole Miss	Sewell-Thomas Stadium	4–5				4,039	29–21	10–15
51	May 15	#14 Ole Miss	Sewell-Thomas Stadium	4–1				4,723	30–21	11–15
52	May 16	#14 Ole Miss	Sewell-Thomas Stadium	6–3				4,034	31–21	12–15
53	May 20	Tennessee	Lindsey Nelson Stadium	11–3				2,304	32–21	13–15
54	May 21	Tennessee	Lindsey Nelson Stadium	4–2				2,487	33–21	14–15
55	May 22	Tennessee	Lindsey Nelson Stadium	9–7				1,694	34–21	15–15

Post-Season
SEC Tournament

#	Date	Opponent	Site/stadium	Score	Win	Loss	Save	Attendance	Overall record	SECT Record
56	May 26	#13 Auburn	Regions Park	7-1	J. Nelson (8–2)	C. Luckie (6–4)	None	12,514	35-21	1-0
57	May 27	Ole Miss	Regions Park	6-3	N. Kilcrease (6–2)	A. Barret (7–4)	J. Smith (4)	12,180	36-21	2-0
58	May 29	#4 Florida	Regions Park	5-2	A. Morgan (6–4)	T. Toledo (3–2)	None	11,542	37-21	3-0
59	May 30	LSU	Regions Park	3–4 (11)	A. Ranaudo (5–2)	J. Smith (1–2)	None	13,327	37-22	3-1

NCAA Tournament: Regionals

#	Date	Opponent	Site/stadium	Score	Win	Loss	Save	Attendance	Overall record	NCAAT Record
60	June 4	Elon	Russ Chandler Stadium	11-2	N. Kilcrease (7–2)	J. Reyes (10–4)	None	1,257	38-22	1-0
61	June 5	#8 Georgia Tech	Russ Chandler Stadium	2-5	D. McGuire (9–4)	J. Nelson (8–3)	A. Robinson (8)	4,157	38-23	1-1
62	June 6	Mercer	Russ Chandler Stadium	5-3	T. Hawley (2–1)	J. French (3–4)	J. Smith (5)	1,191	39-23	2-1
63	June 6	#8 Georgia Tech	Russ Chandler Stadium	8–1	A. Morgan (7–4)	B. Cumpton (9–3)	None	2,187	40-23	3-1
64	June 7	#8 Georgia Tech	Russ Chandler Stadium	10–8	N. Kilcrease (8–2)	J. Bradley (9–5)	None	3,113	41-23	4-1

NCAA Tournament: Super Regionals

#	Date	Opponent	Site/stadium	Score	Win	Loss	Save	Attendance	Overall record	NCAAT Record
65	June 12	#13 Clemson	Doug Kingsmore Stadium	5-4	J. Nelson (9–3)	C. Harman (7–3)	J. Smith (6)	6,346	42-23	5-1
66	June 13	#13 Clemson	Doug Kingsmore Stadium	5-19				6,024	42–24	5-2
67	June 14	#16 Clemson	Doug Kingsmore Stadium	6-8				5,250	42–25	5-3

NCAA Tournament: College World Series

#	Date	Opponent	Site/stadium	Score	Win	Loss	Save	Attendance	Overall record	NCAAT Record

† Indicates the game does not count toward the 2010 Southeastern Conference Standings.
*Rankings are based on the team's current ranking in the Baseball America poll the week Alabama faced each opponent.

== Rankings ==
Ranking movement
Poll	Pre- season	Feb. 22	Mar. 1	Mar. 8	Mar. 15	Mar. 22	Mar. 29	Apr. 5	Apr. 12	Apr. 19	Apr. 26	May 3	May 10	May 17	May 24	May 31	June 8	Final Poll
USA Today/ESPN Coaches' Poll (Top 25)	NR	NR	NR	25	21	16	23	25	NR	NR	NR	NR	NR	NR	NR	NR		18
Baseball America (Top 25)	NR	NR	NR	NR	NR	20	25	24	NR	NR	NR	NR	NR	NR	NR	NR		16
Collegiate Baseball (Top 30)^	NR	NR	NR	30	21	16	NR	NR	NR	NR	NR	NR	NR	NR	NR	NR	16	16
NCBWA (Top 30)†	32	NR	28	27	23	20	29	25	NR	NR	NR	NR	NR	NR	NR	29		
Rivals.com (Top 25)	NR	NR	NR	NR	NR	22	NR	19	NR	NR	NR	NR	NR	NR	NR	NR		17

- NR = Not ranked
- ^ Collegiate Baseball ranked 40 teams in their preseason poll, but will only rank 30 teams weekly during the season.
- † NCBWA ranked 35 teams in their preseason poll, but will only rank 30 teams weekly during the season.

== Awards and honors ==
- Jake Smith

2010 NCBWA Preseason All-American, Third Team
2010 Louisville Slugger/Collegiate Baseball newspaper preseason All-America, Third Team
2010 Ping Baseball Preseason All-American, Third Team

- Ross Wilson

2010 NCBWA Preseason All-American, Second Team
2010 Ping Baseball Preseason All-American, First Team
2010 Baseball America preseason All-American, First Team

== Alabama Crimson Tide in the 2010 MLB draft ==
The following members of the Alabama Crimson Tide baseball program were drafted in the 2010 MLB draft.

Player	Position	Round	Overall	MLB team
Jimmy Nelson	P	2nd	64th	Milwaukee Brewers
Josh Rutledge	SS	3rd	107th	Colorado Rockies
Ross Wilson	2B	10th	308th	Chicago White Sox
Jake Smith	3B	15th	471st	Philadelphia Phillies
Tyler White	P	20th	613th	Detroit Tigers
Jason Townsend	P	31st	927th	Pittsburgh Pirates
Clay Jones	1B	32nd	973rd	Detroit Tigers

== See also ==
- Alabama Crimson Tide baseball
