= 2010 Arkansas Razorbacks baseball team =

American college baseball season

2010 Arkansas Razorbacks baseball

Fayetteville Regional champions

Tempe Super Regional
- Conference: Southeastern Conference
- West

Ranking
- Coaches: No. 10
- AP: No. 9
- Record: 43–21 (18–12 SEC)
- Head coach: Dave Van Horn
- Hitting coach: Todd Butler
- Pitching coach: Dave Jorn
- Home stadium: Baum Stadium

2010 Southeastern Conference baseball standings
| | Conf. | | | | Overall |
| Team | W | | L | PCT | W | | L | PCT |
|---|---|---|---|---|---|---|---|---|
Eastern
| No. 7 Florida ^{x}‍†‍‍^{y} | 22 | – | 8 | .733 | 47 | – | 17 | .734 |
| No. 1 South Carolina ‍‍‍^{y} | 21 | – | 9 | .700 | 54 | – | 16 | .771 |
| No. 14 Vanderbilt ‍‍‍^{y} | 16 | – | 12 | .571 | 46 | – | 20 | .697 |
| Kentucky ‍‍‍ | 13 | – | 17 | .433 | 31 | – | 25 | .554 |
| Tennessee ‍‍‍ | 12 | – | 18 | .400 | 30 | – | 26 | .536 |
| Georgia ‍‍‍ | 5 | – | 23 | .179 | 16 | – | 37 | .302 |
Western
| No. 19 Auburn ^{x}‍‍‍^{y} | 20 | – | 10 | .667 | 43 | – | 21 | .672 |
| No. 13 Arkansas ‍‍‍^{y} | 18 | – | 12 | .600 | 43 | – | 21 | .672 |
| Ole Miss ‍‍‍^{y} | 16 | – | 14 | .533 | 39 | – | 24 | .619 |
| No. 16 Alabama ‍‍‍^{y} | 15 | – | 15 | .500 | 42 | – | 25 | .627 |
| LSU ‍‍‡‍^{y} | 14 | – | 16 | .467 | 41 | – | 22 | .651 |
| Mississippi State ‍‍‍ | 6 | – | 24 | .200 | 23 | – | 33 | .411 |
x – Division champion † – Conference champion ‡ – Tournament champion y – Invited to the NCAA tournament As of June 29, 2010; Rankings from Baseball America

The 2010 Arkansas Razorbacks baseball team represented the University of Arkansas in baseball at the Division I level in the NCAA for the 2010 season. Dave van Horn, a former Razorback player, was the coach in his sixth year at his alma mater. The 2010 club hosted and won the Fayetteville Regional, but fell in the Tempe Super Regional to the top-seeded Arizona State Sun Devils. The team was led by two All-Americans, Brett Eibner and Zack Cox.

== Pre-season ==
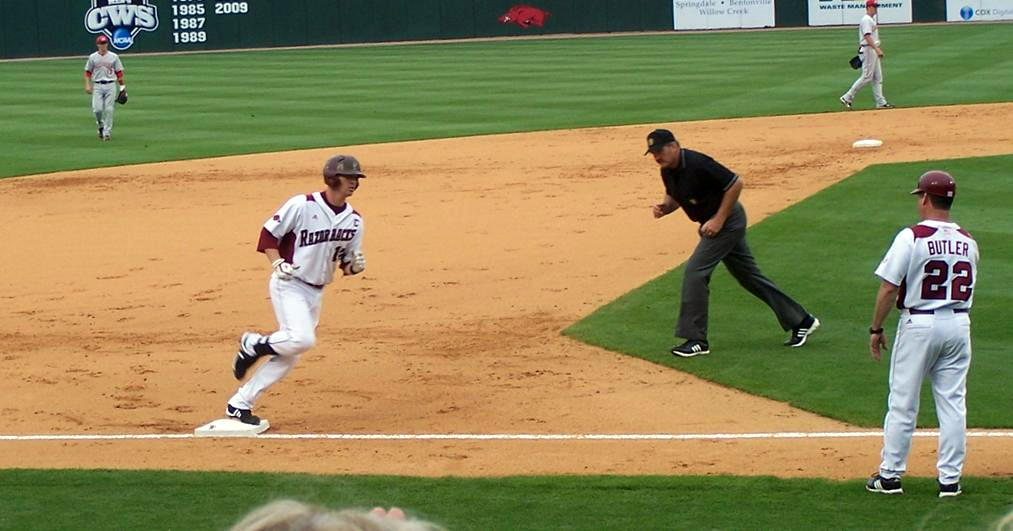
Wilkins (rounding third) started 65 games in 2009.

The Razorbacks return several key members of the 2009 Arkansas Razorbacks baseball team that went to the 2009 College World Series. A key returner is Andy Wilkins, who was named the Norman Regional Most Outstanding Player. The first baseman Wilkins brings a team-high .319 average to the table, also chipping in 19 home runs and 58 RBI in 2009. Freshman All-American Zack Cox returns to play third base for the Razorbacks. He hit .266 with 39 RBI and freshman school record 13 home runs. Center fielder Brett Eibner, a native of The Woodlands, Texas, also brings power with 12 long balls and 34 RBI. Eibner also returns as a pitcher, going 5–5 in 17 games with a 5.00 ERA. Senior pitcher Mike Bolsinger returns from the bullpen, bringing a great slider and 2.99 ERA to the Razorbacks.

== Coaches ==
Source: Baseball – 2010 Coaches

2010 Arkansas Razorbacks baseball Coaches
| Name | Title |
| Dave van Horn | Head Coach |
| Todd Butler | Hitting Coach |
| Dave Jorn | Pitching Coach |
| Chris Curry | Volunteer Assistant Coach |

== Roster ==
2010 Arkansas Razorbacks fall baseball roster
Source: arkansasrazorbacks.com – The Official Site of University of Arkansas Athletics
| Number | Name | Position | B/T | Height | Weight | Class | Hometown/HS/JC |
| 1 | Matt Vinson | OF | S/R | 6–2 | 195 | Fr. | Alma, Ark./Alma |
| 5 | Matt Reynolds | INF | R/R | 6–1 | 195 | Fr. | Tulsa, Okla./Bishop Kelley HS |
| 6 | Ben Crumpton | INF | R/R | 5–10 | 180 | Fr. | Hot Springs, Ark./Lakeside HS |
| 7 | Zack Cox | INF/RHP | L/R | 6–0 | 215 | So. | Louisville, Ky./Pleasure Ridge Park HS |
| 8 | Derrick Bleeker | RHP/INF | R/R | 6–5 | 200 | Fr. | Longmont, Colo./Skyline HS |
| 9 | Monk Kreder | C | R/R | 6–1 | 230 | Jr./TR | Keller, Texas/Keller HS/Texas Tech/Howard CC |
| 10 | Kendall Wehrle | INF | L/R | 6–3 | 195 | So. | Papillion, Neb./La Vista South HS |
| 11 | Franco Broyles | OF | R/R | 6–0 | 185 | Fr. | Fayetteville, Ark./Fayetteville HS |
| 12 | Bo Bigham | INF | R/R | 5–11 | 170 | So. | Texarkana, Ark./Arkansas HS |
| 13 | Randall Fant | LHP | L/L | 6–4 | 185 | Fr. | Texarkana, Texas/Texas HS |
| 14 | Jarrod McKinney | OF | R/R | 6–0 | 220 | So. | Hughes Springs, Texas/Hughes Springs HS |
| 15 | TJ Forrest | RHP | R/R | 6–6 | 175 | Sr. | Benton, La./Haughton HS/LSU/Bossier Parish CC |
| 16 | Travis Sample | OF | R/R | 5–11 | 195 | Jr. (redshirt) | Dallas, Texas/Lake Highlands HS/Howard JC |
| 17 | Andy Wilkins | INF | L/R | 6–2 | 220 | Jr. | Broken Arrow, Okla./Broken Arrow HS |
| 18 | Tim Carver | INF | R/R | 5–11 | 175 | So. (redshirt) | Fayetteville, Ark./Fayetteville HS |
| 19 | Tom Hauskey | C | R/R | 5–11 | 190 | Sr. | Springdale, Ark./Springdale HS |
| 20 | Zac Russell | C | R/R | 5–10 | 205 | Fr. (redshirt) | Bulverde, Texas/Smithson Valley HS |
| 21 | Kyle Atkins | OF | R/R | 5–10 | 185 | Fr. (redshirt) | DeQueen, Ark./DeQueen HS |
| 24 | Brett Eibner | OF/RHP | R/R | 6–4 | 210 | Jr. | Houston, Texas/The Woodlands HS |
| 25 | Collin Kuhn | OF/INF | R/R | 5–11 | 190 | So. (redshirt) | Beaver Dam, Wis./Beaver Dam HS |
| 26 | Jason Fuqua | LHP | L/L | 6–3 | 180 | Jr./TR | Baytown, Texas/Sterling HS/Texas A&M/Alvin JC |
| 27 | James McCann | C | R/R | 6–3 | 205 | So. | Santa Barbara, Calif./Dos Pueblos HS |
| 28 | Kyle Robinson | OF/INF | R/R | 6–3 | 215 | Jr./TR | Boca Raton, Fla./Westminster Acad./Indian River CC |
| 29 | D. J. Baxendale | RHP | R/R | 6–2 | 175 | Fr. | Jacksonville, Ark./Sylvan Hills HS |
| 32 | Mike Bolsinger | RHP | R/R | 6–2 | 212 | Sr. | McKinney, Texas/North McKinney HS/Grayson [Texas] CC |
| 33 | Drew Smyly | LHP | L/L | 6–3 | 190 | So. (redshirt) | Little Rock, Ark./Central HS |
| 34 | Jeremy Heatley | RHP | R/R | 6–2 | 215 | Sr. | Breckenridge, Texas/Breckenridge HS/TX A&M-Kingsville/North Lake Col. |
| 35 | Christian Kowalchuk | LHP | L/L | 6–1 | 185 | Sr. | Saskatoon, Saskatchewan/Seward CC |
| 36 | Scott Limbocker | LHP | L/L | 6–3 | 220 | Jr. (redshirt) | Overland Park, Kan./Blue Valley North HS |
| 37 | Trent Daniel | LHP | R/L | 6–1 | 181 | So./TR | Bryant, Ark./Bryant HS/Ark.-Fort Smith |
| 38 | Erik Shannahan | RHP | R/R | 6–3 | 205 | Fr. | Collinsville, Ill./Collinsville HS |
| 39 | Garrett Methvin | LHP | S/L | 6–2 | 190 | Fr. | Longview, Texas/Springhill HS |
| 40 | Jordan Pratt | RHP | R/R | 6–3 | 215 | Jr./TR | Harrison, Ark./Harrison HS/Ark.-Fort Smith |
| 43 | Andrew Pratt | OF | R/R | 5–11 | 190 | Fr. (redshirt) | Coppell, Texas/Coppell HS |
| 45 | Sam Murphy | RHP | R/R | 6–0 | 210 | Jr. (redshirt) | Omaha, Neb./Westside HS |
| 47 | Geoffrey Davenport | LHP | L/L | 6–1 | 175 | So. | Ft. Worth, Texas/Paschal HS |
| 48 | Zack Hall | LHP | L/L | 6–1 | 190 | Fr. (redshirt) | Springdale, Ark./Har-Ber HS |

== Schedule ==
2010 Game Log
Regular season

| # | Date | Opponent | Location | Score | Win | Loss | Save | Attendance | Record | SEC |
|---|---|---|---|---|---|---|---|---|---|---|
| 1 | 2/19/10 | Ball State | Baum Stadium | 10–2 | Bolsinger (1–0) | Piatt (0–1) | Forrest (1) | 7,359 | 1–0 | |
| 2 | 2/20/10 | Ball State | Baum Stadium | 2–5 | Coombs (1–0) | Davenport (0–1) | – | 8,004 | 1–1 | |
| 3 | 2/21/10 | Ball State | Baum Stadium | 9–3 | Eibner (1–0) | Vitek (0–1) | – | 6,536 | 2–1 | |
| 4 | 2/26/10 | Troy | Baum Stadium | 10–1 | Forrest (1–0) | Ray (1–1) | – | 6,745 | 3–1 | |
| 5 | 2/27/10 | Troy | Baum Stadium | 10–8 | Heatley (1–0) | McCain (1–1) | Baxendale (1) | 7,792 | 4–1 | |
| 6 | 2/28/10 | Troy | Baum Stadium | 7–6 | Eibner (2–0) | Dickinson (1–1) | Baxendale (2) | 7,373 | 5–1 | |
| 7 | 3/2/10 | No. 25 Kansas | Baum Stadium | 15–3 | Davenport (1–1) | Poppe (0–1) | – | 6,395 | 6–1 | |
| 8 | 3/5/10 | at No. 22 Cal | Evans Diamond | 7–3 | Bolsinger (2–0) | Jones (2–1) | Baxendale (3) | 246 | 7–1 | |
| 9 | 3/6/10 | at No. 22 Cal | Evans Diamond | 9–5 | Smyly (1–0) | Anderson (2–1) | – | 467 | 8–1 | |
| 10 | 3/7/10 | at No. 22 Cal | Evans Diamond | 0–6 | Miller (1–1) | Eibner (2–1) | Diemer (1) | 597 | 8–2 | |
| 11 | 3/9/10 | South Dakota St. | Baum Stadium | 2–3 | Oberle (1–0) | Murphy (0–1) | Vermeulen (1) | 6,438 | 8–3 | |
| 12 | 3/10/10 | South Dakota St. | Baum Stadium | 21–2 | Fant (1–0) | Bougher (0–1) | Baxendale (4) | 6,698 | 9–3 | |
| 13 | 3/12/10 | Wisc.-Milwaukee | Baum Stadium | 14–6 | Davenport (2–1) | Franzke (2–2) | – | 6,450 | 10–3 | |
| 14 | 3/13/10 | Wisc.-Milwaukee | Baum Stadium | 7–0 | Smyly (2–0) | Pierce (1–2) | – | 6,843 | 11–3 | |
| 15 | 3/14/10 | Wisc.-Milwaukee | Baum Stadium | 3–2 | Heatley (2–0) | Amsrud (0–2) | – | 6,829 | 12–3 | |
| 16 | 3/19/10 | at No. 2 LSU | Alex Box Stadium | 6–3 | Bolsinger (3–0) | Ross (2–1) | – | 11,225 | 13–3 | 1–0 |
| 17 | 3/20/10 | at No. 2 LSU | Alex Box Stadium | 7–8 | Bradshaw (4–0) | Davenport (2–2) | Ott (7) | 10,944 | 13–4 | 1–1 |
| 18 | 3/21/10 | at No. 2 LSU | Alex Box Stadium | 1–5 | Matulis (3–0) | Eibner (2–2) | Rittiner (1) | 10,168 | 13–5 | 1–2 |
| 19 | 3/23/10 | at McNeese St. | Cowboy Diamond | 3–2 | Forrest (2–0) | Click (0–1) | Heatley (1) | 792 | 14–5 | 1–2 |
| 20 | 3/24/10 | at McNeese St. | Cowboy Diamond | 7–6 | Kowalchuk (1–0) | Ducoff (0–1) | Baxendale (5) | 822 | 15–5 | 1–2 |
| 21 | 3/26/10 | No. 16 Alabama | Baum Stadium | 9–8 | Forrest (3–0) | Whitaker (1–1) | Baxendale (6) | 8,492 | 16–5 | 2–2 |
| 22 | 3/27/10 | No. 16 Alabama | Baum Stadium | 4–3 | Pratt (1–0) | White (2–2) | – | 8,332 | 17–5 | 3–2 |
| 23 | 3/28/10 | No. 16 Alabama | Baum Stadium | 10–5 | Forrest (4–0) | Scott (0–1) | – | 7,130 | 18–5 | 4–2 |
| 24 | 3/30/10 | Centenary | Baum Stadium | 18–2 | Kowalchuk (2–0) | Lugo (0–1) | – | 7,823 | 19–5 | 4–2 |
| 25 | 3/31/10 | Centenary | Baum Stadium | 9–4 | Forrest (5–0) | Tompkins (1–2) | – | 7,596 | 20–5 | 4–2 |
| 26 | 4/2/10 | No. 18 Kentucky | Baum Stadium | 8–12 | Kennedy (2–1) | Bolsinger (3–1) | – | 7,118 | 20–6 | 4–3 |
| 27 | 4/3/10 | No. 18 Kentucky | Baum Stadium | 10–1 | Smyly (3–0) | Rogers (3–3) | – | 9,455 | 21–6 | 5–3 |
| 28 | 4/4/10 | No. 18 Kentucky | Baum Stadium | 17–16 | Bolsinger (4–1) | Little (1–1) | – | 7,614 | 22–6 | 6–3 |
| 29 | 4/7/10 | St. Louis | Baum Stadium | 32–8 | Fant (2–0) | Schrader (1–2) | – | 7,527 | 23–6 | 6–3 |
| 30 | 4/9/10 | at Mississippi State | Dudy Noble Field | 8–3 | Smyly (4–0) | Reed (0–3) | – | 6,280 | 24–6 | 7–3 |
| 31 | 4/10/10 | at Mississippi State | Dudy Noble Field | 8–5 | Heatley (3–0) | Girodo (1–2) | Baxendale (7) | 6,179 | 25–6 | 8–3 |
| 32 | 4/11/10 | at Mississippi State | Dudy Noble Field | 13–3 | Fant (3–0) | Johnson (0–1) | – | 6,058 | 26–6 | 9–3 |
| 33 | 4/13/10 | No. 19 New Mexico | Baum Stadium | 4–3 | Heatley (4–0) | Sanchez (2–2) | – | 7,995 | 27–6 | 9–3 |
| 34 | 4/14/10 | No. 19 New Mexico | Baum Stadium | 5–4 | Kowalchuk (3–0) | Kenny (2–1) | – | 8,523 | 28–6 | 9–3 |
| 35 | 4/16/10 | No. 25 Georgia | Baum Stadium | 10–2 | Smyly (5–0) | Grimm (2–5) | – | 9,047 | 29–6 | 10–3 |
| 36 | 4/17/10 | No. 25 Georgia | Baum Stadium | 10–2 | Eibner (3–2) | Walters (1–3) | – | 8,772 | 30–6 | 11–3 |
| 37 | 4/18/10 | No. 25 Georgia | Baum Stadium | 13–5 | Forrest (6–0) | Palazzone (4–4) | – | 8,246 | 31–6 | 12–3 |
| 38 | 4/20/10 | Oral Roberts | Baum Stadium | 9–5 | Heatley (5–0) | Dunn (1–1) | – | 7,776 | 32–6 | 12–3 |
| 39 | 4/23/10 | at No. 4 Florida | McKethan Stadium | 8–3 | Smyly (6–0) | Panteliodis (6–2) | – | 3,622 | 33–6 | 13–3 |
| 40 | 4/24/10 | at No. 4 Florida | McKethan Stadium | 2–8 | Randall (4–3) | Eibner (3–3) | – | 3,116 | 33–7 | 13–4 |
| 41 | 4/25/10 | at No. 4 Florida | McKethan Stadium | 1–2 | Chapman (2–0) | Bolsinger (4–2) | – | 2,873 | 33–8 | 13–5 |
| 42 | 4/28/10 | Missouri St. | Baum Stadium | 5–4 | Pratt (2–0) | Blake (2–4) | Heatley (2) | 7,868 | 34–8 | 13–5 |
| 43 | 4/30/10 | No. 20 Auburn | Baum Stadium | 9–4 | Smyly (7–0) | Hurst (2–1) | – | 7,264 | 35–8 | 14–5 |
| 44 | 5/1/10 | No. 20 Auburn | Baum Stadium | 7–8 | Smith (2–0) | Fant (3–1) | Hubbard (5) | 8,713 | 35–9 | 14–6 |
| 45 | 5/2/10 | No. 20 Auburn | Baum Stadium | 2–13 | Dayton (5–2) | Eibner (3–4) | – | 8,205 | 35–10 | 14–7 |
| 46 | 5/7/10 | at No. 11 Ole Miss | Swayze Field | 11–4 | Smyly (8–0) | Pomeranz (6–1) | Pratt (1) | 8,519 | 36–10 | 15–7 |
| 47 | 5/8/10 | at No. 11 Ole Miss | Swayze Field | 2–3 | Barrett (7–2) | Baxendale (0–1) | Huber (8) | 8,834 | 36–11 | 15–8 |
| 48 | 5/9/10 | at No. 11 Ole Miss | Swayze Field | 7–0 | Bolsinger (5–2) | Goforth (1–3) | – | 6,855 | 37–11 | 16–8 |
| 49 | 5/11/10 | Louisiana Tech | Dickey-Stephens Park | 5–4 (10) | Pratt (3–0) | Petersen (5–6) | – | 10,200 | 38–11 | 16–8 |
| 50 | 5/14/10 | No. 5 South Carolina | Baum Stadium | 2–3 | Cooper (10–0) | Smyly (8–1) | Price (6) | 9,622 | 38–12 | 16–9 |
| 51 | 5/15/10 | No. 5 South Carolina | Baum Stadium | 0–5 | Dyson (5–4) | Bolsinger (5–3) | – | 8,670 | 38–13 | 16–10 |
| 52 | 5/16/10 | No. 5 South Carolina | Baum Stadium | 3–5 | Taylor (3–2) | Pratt (3–1) | Price (7) | 8,227 | 38–14 | 16–11 |
| 53 | 5/18/10 | at No. 9 Oklahoma | L. Dale Mitchell Park | 2–5 | Rocha (7–1) | Fant (3–2) | – | 1,553 | 38–15 | 16–11 |
| 54 | 5/20/10 | at No. 18 Vanderbilt | Baum Stadium | 3–4 | Gray (8–4) | Baxendale (0–2) | Reid (1) | 2,192 | 38–16 | 16–12 |
| 55 | 5/21/10 | No. 18 Vanderbilt | Baum Stadium | 4–3 | Bolsinger (6–3) | Hill (5–4) | Eibner (1) | 2,589 | 39–16 | 17–12 |
| 56 | 5/22/10 | No. 18 Vanderbilt | Baum Stadium | 7–5 | Forrest (7–0) | Armstrong (7–2) | – | 3,693 | 40–16 | 18–12 |

SEC Tournament

| # | Date | Opponent | Location | Score | Win | Loss | Save | Record | SEC Tourney Record |
|---|---|---|---|---|---|---|---|---|---|
| 57 | 5/26/10 | _{5}Vanderbilt | Regions Park | 0–2 | Gray (9–4) | Murphy (0–2) | Reid (2) | 40–17 | 0–1 |
| 58 | 5/27/10 | _{1}Florida | Regions Park | 4–5 | Panteliodis (9–2) | Bolsinger (6–4) | Chapman (11) | 40–18 | 0–2 |

NCAA tournament: Fayetteville Regional

| # | Date | Opponent | Location | Score | Win | Loss | Save | Att | Record | NCAAT Record |
|---|---|---|---|---|---|---|---|---|---|---|
| 59 | 6/4/10 | Grambling | Baum Stadium | 19–7 | Murphy (1–2) | Davila (7–5) | – | 6,305 | 41–18 | 1–0 |
| 60 | 6/5/10 | Washington State | Baum Stadium | 6–4 | Smyly (9–1) | Conley (5–4) | Pratt (2) | 9,016 | 42–18 | 2–0 |
| 61 | 6/12/10 | Washington State | Baum Stadium | 10–7 | Wise (4–1) | Bolsinger (6–5) | Arnold (1) | 7,750 | 42–19 | 2–1 |
| 62 | 6/12/10 | Washington State | Baum Stadium | 7–2 | Forrest (8–0) | Shewey (7–3) | – | 7,065 | 43–19 | 3–1 |

NCAA tournament: Tempe Super Regional

| # | Date | Opponent | Location | Score | Win | Loss | Save | Att | Record | NCAAT Record |
|---|---|---|---|---|---|---|---|---|---|---|
| 63 | 6/12/10 | _{1}Arizona State | Packard Stadium | 6–7 (12) | Lambson (8–2) | Eibner (3–5) | – | 4,371 | 43–20 | 3–2 |
| 64 | 6/13/10 | _{1}Arizona State | Packard Stadium | 5–7 (12) | Swagerty (2–0) | Forrest (8–1) | – | 4371 | 43–21 | 3–3 |

=== February ===
==== Ball State ====
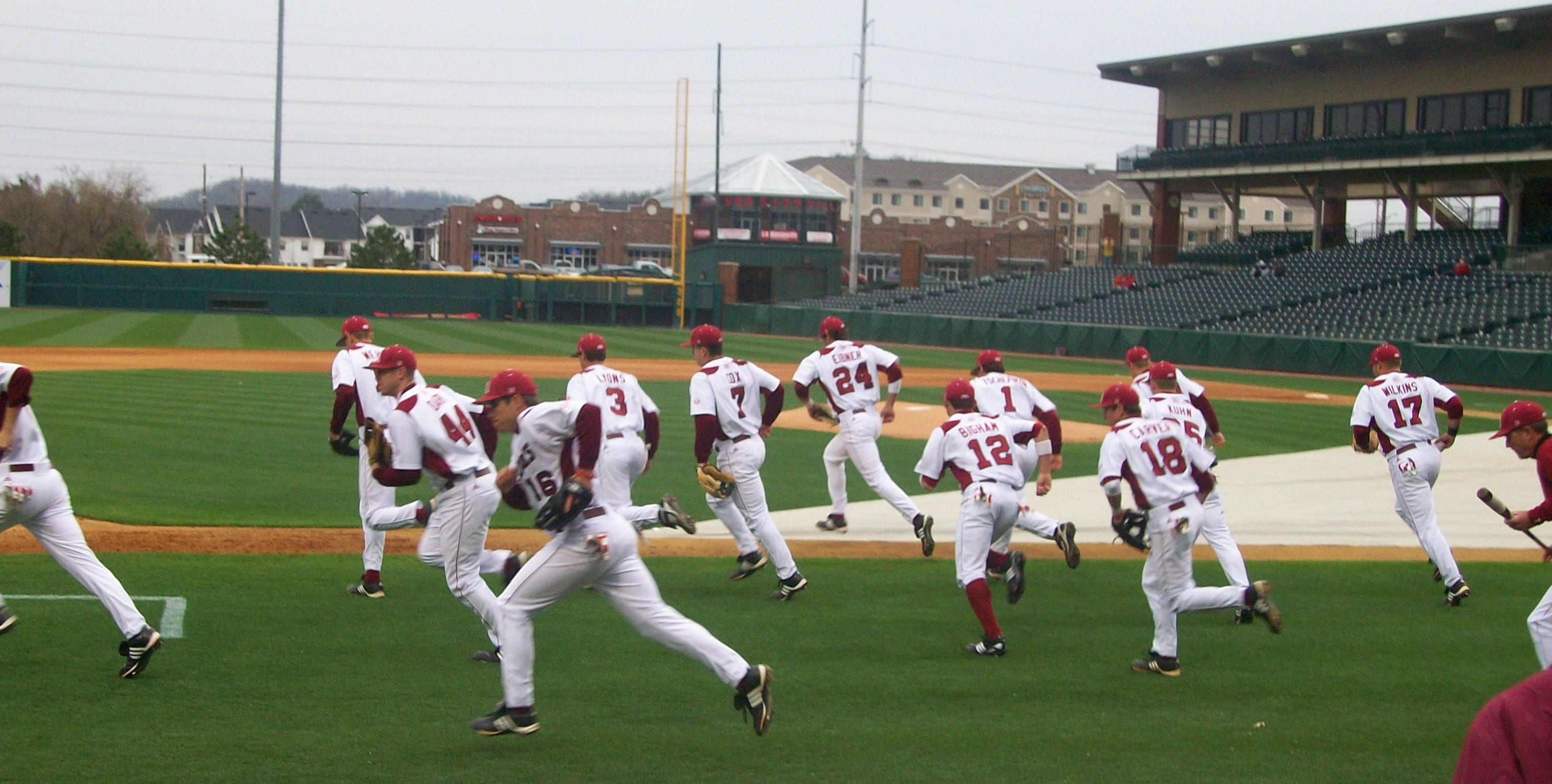
The Diamond Hogs take the field in 2009.

The Razorbacks began the 2010 campaign on February 19 with a 10–2 victory over the Ball State Cardinals. Hogs starter Mike Bolsinger earned the win, and Andy Wilkins provided two hits, 2 RBI, and a solo home run. Every Razorback starting player recorded at least a base hit in the contest. It was a different story in game two, however, as Ball State took a lead in the first inning and did not relinquish it. Geoffrey Davenport would continue after the shaky start to pitch effectively for four innings, including striking out the side in the fourth. The Razorbacks left twelve runners on base, and committed four defensive errors. Game three was initially delayed fifteen minutes due to rain, but once the game started, Brett Eibner and Drew Smyly pitched well. Designated hitter Monk Kreder, a junior college transfer native to Keller, Texas, collected three hits. Six different Razorbacks scored in the 9–3 victory.

==== Troy ====
Andy Wilkins, James McCann, and Brett Eibner all went deep in game one of a three game series against the Troy Trojans. Zack Cox was 2–2 with one RBI and two runs scored as the Razorbacks prevailed 10–1. Wilkins, Eibner, and Cox would hit home runs in game two, as the No. 16 Diamond Hogs took a 10–8 slugfest. Redshirt sophomore Drew Smyly started the game, Jeremy Heatley earned the win, and DJ Baxendale, the Arkansas Gatorade Player of the Year as a high school senior, earned his first career save. The Razorbacks started game three with seven runs in the first two innings, but then the bats fell silent. Troy posted six runs, but the Trojans couldn't complete the comeback and lost 7–6.

=== March ===
==== #25 Kansas ====
Arkansas hosted the No. 25 Kansas Jayhawks at Baum Stadium on March 2. The Razorback offense exploded, with Jarrod McKinney and Monk Kreder both leaving the yard for the first times in their careers. TJ Forrest began the game for the Hogs, and Geoffrey Davenport earned the win in relief.

==== #22 California ====
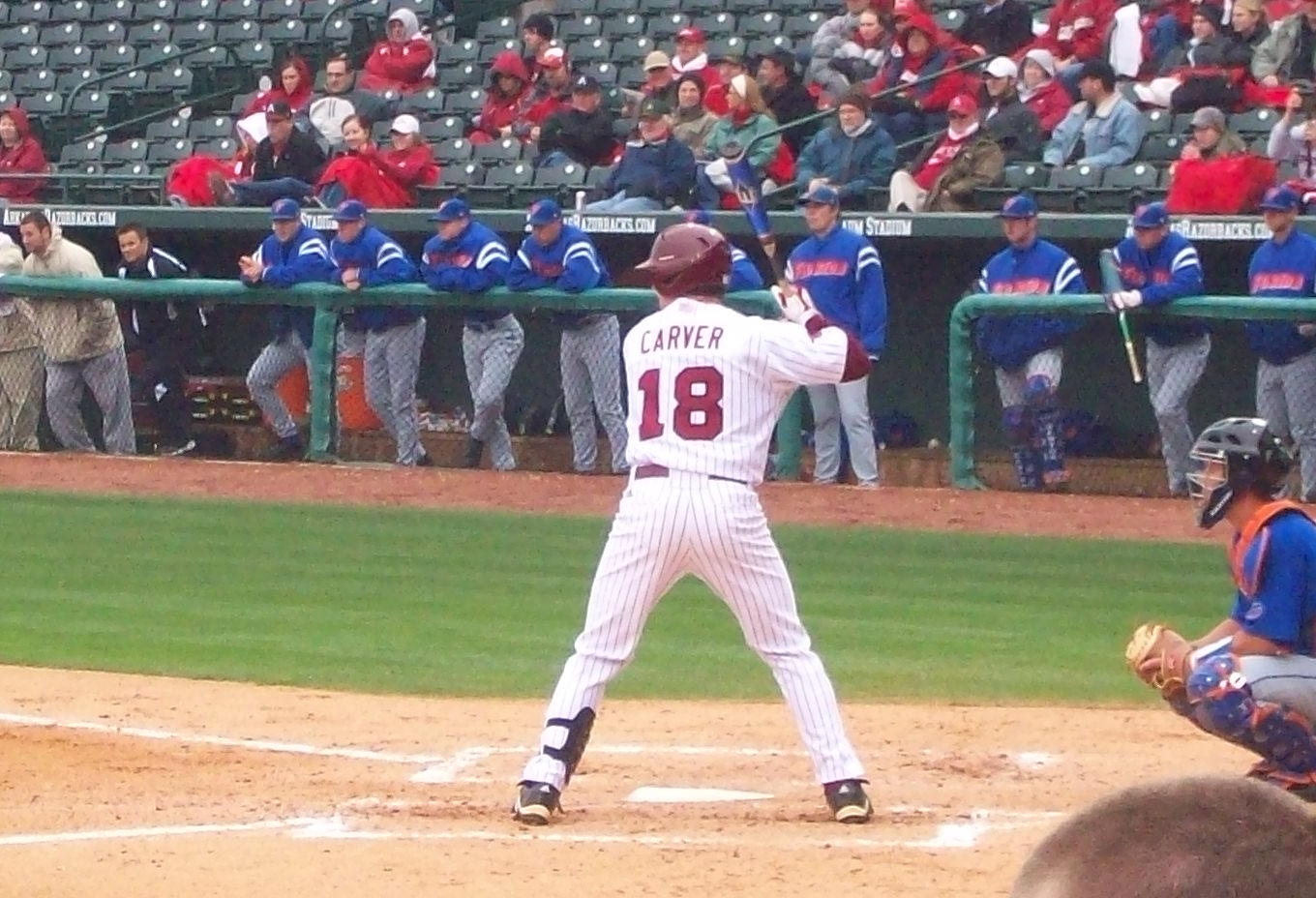
Carver attended Fayetteville High School.

In the year previous, the Hogs took two of three home games from Cal. This year, the Razorbacks would travel to Evans Diamond in Berkeley, California for the first time ever to take on the No. 22 California Golden Bears. Game one featured a five-run eighth inning for the Razorbacks, including a three-run home run by James McCann. Mike Bolsinger went seven innings (his longest outing) to earn the win. The subsequent day, Fayetteville-native Tim Carver hit two home runs, the first two of his career. Zack Cox going 3 for 4 with 2 RBI, combined with Carver's power, propelled the Hogs to a 9–5 victory. Game three was not as kind to the visiting Hogs, as three errors and eight men left on base would prove vital in a 6–0 loss. The loss snapped the Razorbacks' seven-game winning streak, the University's longest since 2006.

==== South Dakota State ====
The South Dakota State Jackrabbits began the 2010 season on a 27-game road trip, including two games in Fayetteville against the No. 14 Razorbacks. Game one against the Jackrabbits produced a disappointing 3–2 loss for the Razorbacks. The Diamond Hogs loaded the bases with no outs in the final frame, but only pushed across one run. Collin Kuhn stole three bases in the loss. The Razorbacks would exact revenge the following day, scoring twenty one runs. Bo Bigham went 3 for 5 with 4 RBI, with home runs coming from Collin Kuhn and Zack Cox. Seven Razorbacks had 2+ hits, and six posted one or more RBI.

==== Wisconsin-Milwaukee ====
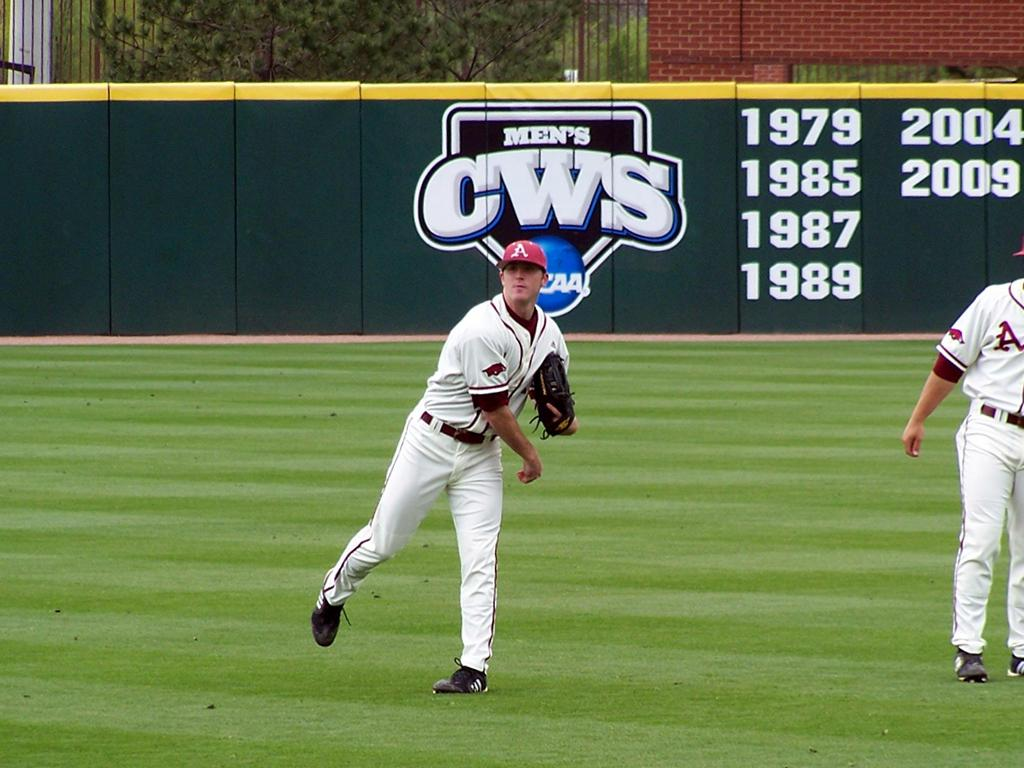
Vinson hit a walk-off home run to win game three.

Entering the series against Wisconsin-Milwaukee, Collin Kuhn had reached base in all twelve games, and leads the team with a .395 batting average. The Razorbacks' 17 team home runs leads the SEC. The Razorbacks used eight runs in the seventh inning to rally past the Panthers. The game featured catcher James McCann hitting a grand slam and Zack Cox's hitting streak extending to thirteen games. Game two belonged to Drew Smyly, as the Little Rock native struck out 11 in seven innings, walked two, and giving up four hits. Offensively, Collin Kuhn and Andy Wilkins both homered in the 7–0 victory. The Razorback offense would produce plenty of drama in game three, turning a two-run deficit in the ninth inning into a tenth inning walk-off home run courtesy Matt Vinson. The Alma, Arkansas native would earn SEC Player of the Week honors for his efforts against Wisconsin–Milwaukee, the alma mater of legendary Razorback baseball coach Norm DeBriyn.

==== #2 Louisiana State ====
The highly anticipated series began March 19 at Alex Box Stadium. It was carried on Cox Sports Television. Arkansas took game one, 6–3, behind Brett Eibner's two home runs and a strong seven inning pitching performance from Mike Bolsinger. In game two, Arkansas gave up a four-run lead in the seventh inning to lose 7–8. Collin Kuhn had four RBI and a home run, and Zack Cox also left the yard. Game three went to the Bengal Tigers by a 5–1 final, with Eibner's solo shot providing the only run for the Hogs.

==== McNeese State ====
Arkansas' road trip through Louisiana continued to Lake Charles, where the Hogs took on McNeese State University. TJ Forrest, a Louisiana native and LSU transfer, picked up the win in relief. Monk Kreder's RBI single in the sixth inning would prove the game winner, as the Razorbacks took a 3–2 win. Game two also went to the Razorbacks, by a score of 7–6. Matt Reynolds hit his first home run as a Razorback, and Zack Cox extended his hitting streak to 20 games. Razorback pitchers struck out fourteen Cowboys in the contest.

==== #16 Alabama ====
The Razorbacks, ranked as high as 15, took on the No. 16 Alabama Crimson Tide in Baum Stadium for their SEC home opener. Arkansas scored four runs in the eighth inning of game one, leading to a 9–8 victory. Game two also ended in a Razorback comeback. The Hogs, down 3–0 in the seventh inning, got a big hit from pinch hitter Thomas Hauskey. The senior catcher stepped to the plate with a runner on second base and two outs in the bottom of the ninth, and delivered a clutch RBI single to win the game. Collin Kuhn, Zack Cox, Andy Wilkins and Brett Eibner each hit home runs in game three to give the Hogs a 10–5 win. The sweep was the first of Alabama since 2006.

==== Centenary ====
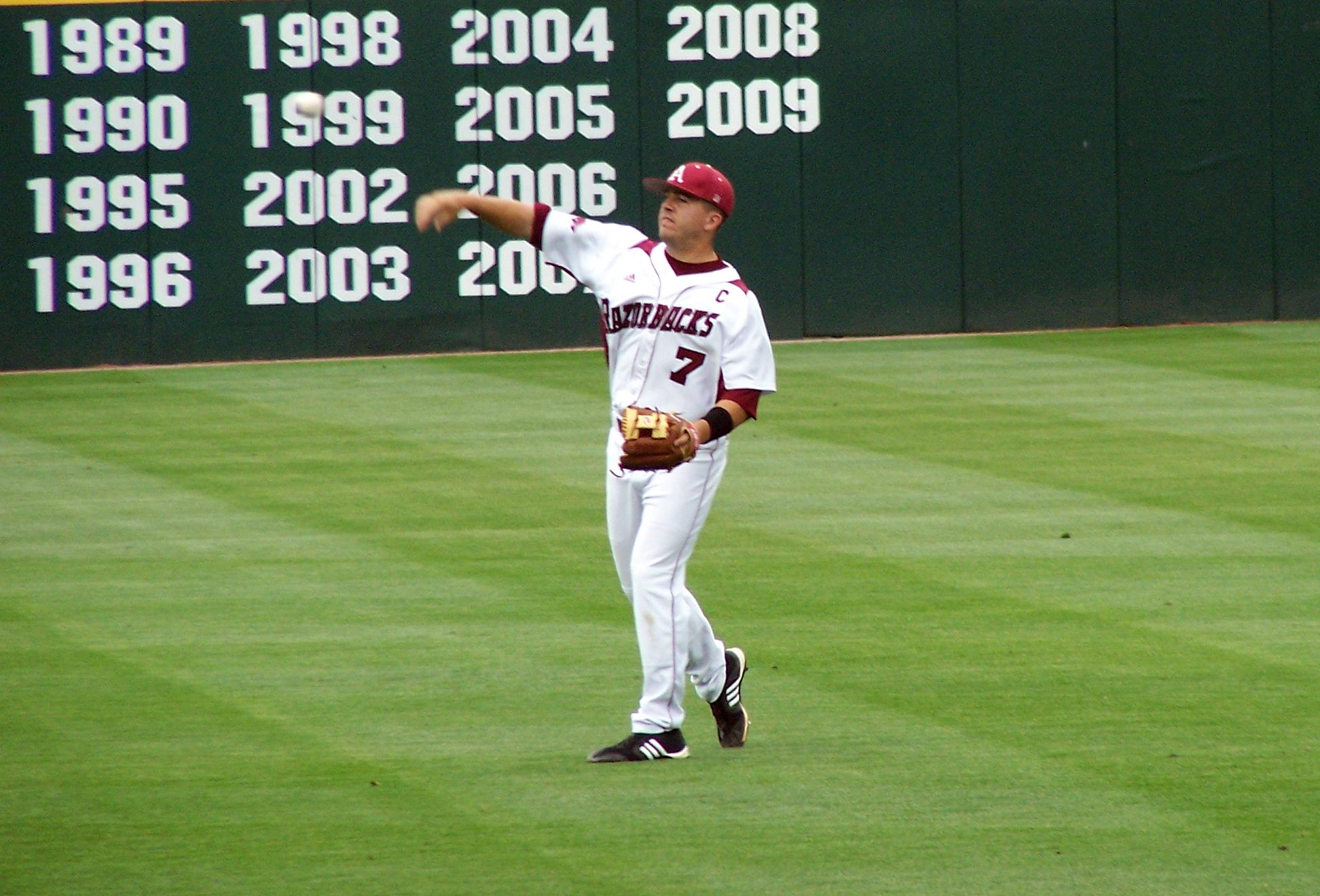
Cox began the year on a 24-game hitting streak that ended in game two against Centenary.

Arkansas mauled Centenary in game one, scoring thirteen runs in the fourth and fifth innings on the way to an 18–2 win. Bo Bigham and Matt Vinson both recorded three hits apiece, with Andy Wilkins recording 4 RBI and Kyle Robinson chipping in three more RBI. Centenary led by as many as four runs in game two, but Wilkins, James McCann and Bigham each hit RBI doubles in the sixth inning to take control. The win gives Arkansas another seven-game winning streak to close out March.

=== April ===
Entering April, Arkansas is led at the plate by Zack Cox, who is hitting at a .414 clip. Andy Wilkins leads in home runs with 10, followed by Brett Eibner with 7. Wilkins also leads in RBI with 34, and total bases with 69. Drew Smyly leads the starters with a 1.69 earned run average (ERA) over 26 2/3 innings. Dual threat Eibner is second with a 2.28 ERA. Arkansas' 3.24 team ERA is the second-best in the SEC (behind Vanderbilt).

==== #18 Kentucky ====
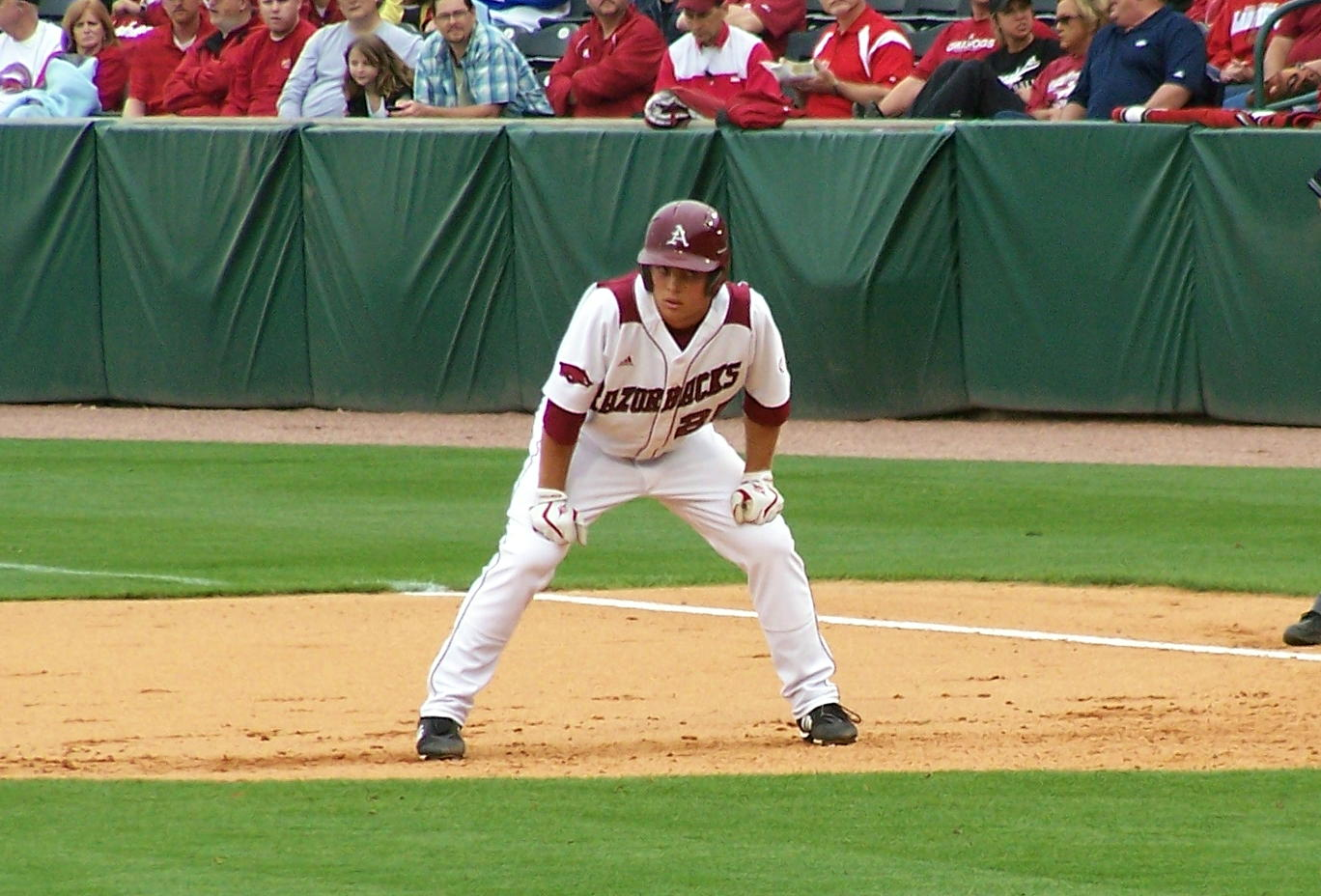
Kuhn's first career grand slam gave the Razorbacks a walk-off win against Kentucky in game three.

The No. 18 Kentucky Wildcats baseball team came to Baum Stadium for a three game series, starting April 2. In game one, Braden Kapteyn of Kentucky hit a two-run home run in the first inning, and the Wildcats went on to win 12–8. Mike Bolsinger lasted only 2 1/3 innings, and the Hogs' seven-game winning streak came to an end. Arkansas would collect seventeen hits in game two, with Drew Smyly pitching seven innings of one-run baseball, as the Razorbacks won 10–1. Collin Kuhn, Zack Cox, Brett Eibner, Tim Carver and James McCann all had multiple hits in game two. Andy Wilkins would leave the game due to a hamstring injury. Game three, played on Easter Sunday, began with the Wildcats jumping out to five-run lead to start the game. In the bottom of the second, Razorbacks catcher James McCann powered a three-run homer over the fence, and coupled with some Kentucky miscues, the Razorbacks took an 8–5 lead. The UK offense would strike again for seven runs in the seventh off of Razorback reliever DJ Baxendale to make it 16–13 Wildcat lead. In the ninth, Jarrod McKinney drew a walk, followed by a McCann single and Andy Wilkins pinch-hit walk. Collin Kuhn was due up, and with two outs and two strikes, Kuhn took the pitch from Matt Little over the left field fence for a walk-off grand slam. The 17–16 final capped a very offensive weekend for the Hogs, including 35 runs and 48 hits.

==== Saint Louis ====
Arkansas scored fourteen runs, a school record, in the first inning, and won easily, 32–8, in seven innings. The Razorbacks first twelve batters reached base before the Billikens recorded an out. Collin Kuhn, Kyle Atkins, Bo Bigham, Zack Cox, Derrick Bleeker, Matt Vinson, Monk Kreder, Travis Sample, Tim Carver, Kyle Robinson, and Tom Hauskey all had multiple hits for the Razorbacks, with home runs from Kuhn, Bigham, Brett Eibner, and Vinson.

==== Mississippi State ====
Arkansas earned its first ever road sweep in Starkville when they took all three games from Mississippi State. The Razorbacks won the first game of the series 8–3; which was also Van Horn's 300th win as the head coach of Arkansas. The winning pitcher was Smyly bringing his record to 4–0 on the season. Game two was placed Saturday afternoon and the Razorbacks picked up another win with a final score of 8–5. The game also marked the 10th consecutive game with 10 or more hits, the longest such streak since 2003. The finale was a 13–3 win for the Razorbacks. It was also the 6th consecutive win for the team. The series in Starkville concluded after three games with almost 20,000 total fans in attendance for the series.

==== #19 New Mexico ====
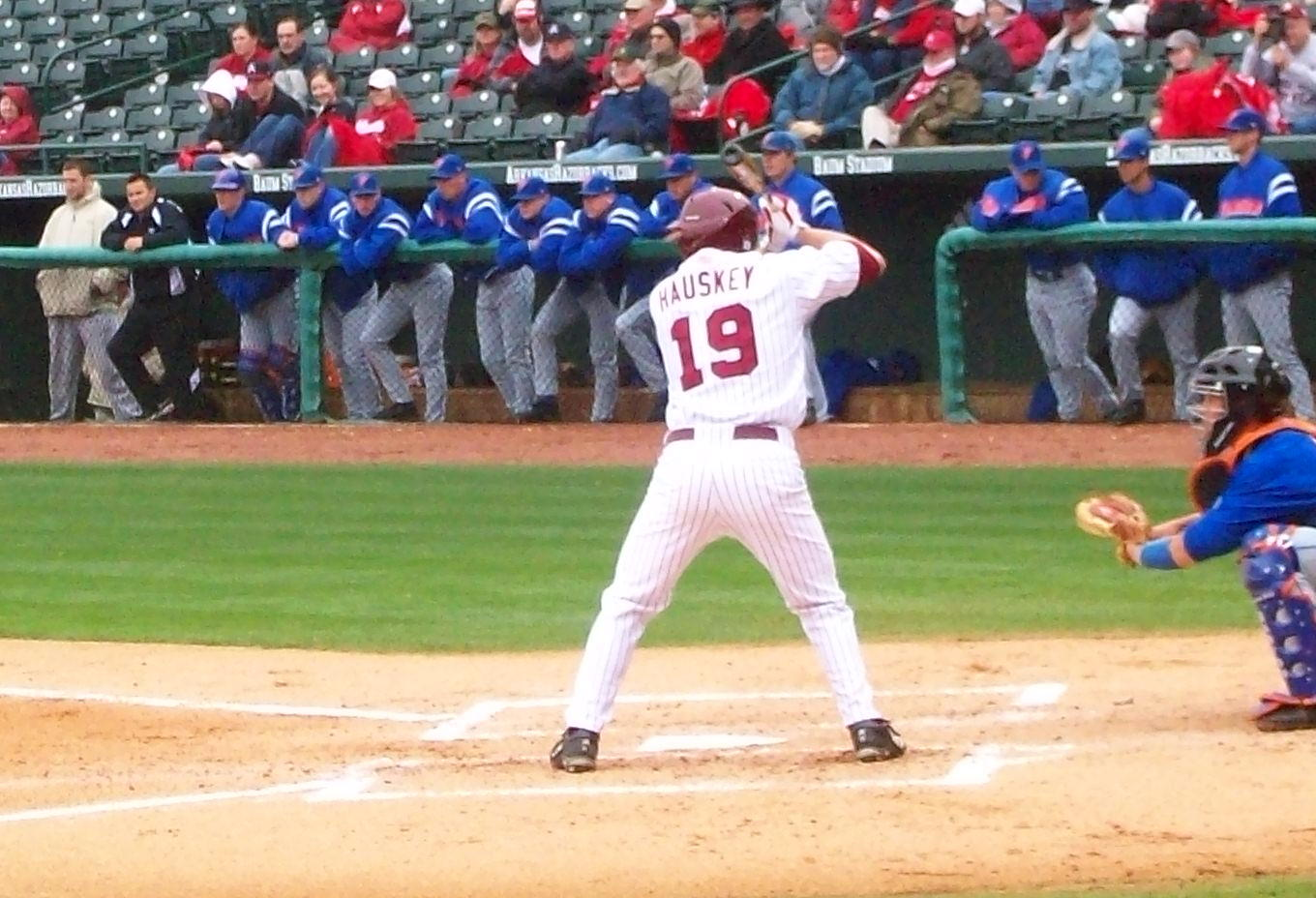
Hauskey is a native of Springdale, Arkansas.

Arkansas hosted the No. 19 New Mexico Lobos for a midweek series at Baum Stadium. The series started off with an 11 inning game concluding in an Arkansas win. The Razorbacks won the first game of the series on a walk-off hit by Hauskey, his second of the season. Heatley was awarded the win, which brought his record to 4–0 on the season. The second game of the series was also a one run win for the Razorbacks. Arkansas won the second game of the series 5–4 in 9 inning Kowalchuk improved to 3–0 on the season Arkansas finished the New Mexico series with two wins to bring their win streak up to 8 consecutive games. Baum Stadium also saw almost 16,000 people in the stands for the two game midweek series.

==== #25 Georgia ====
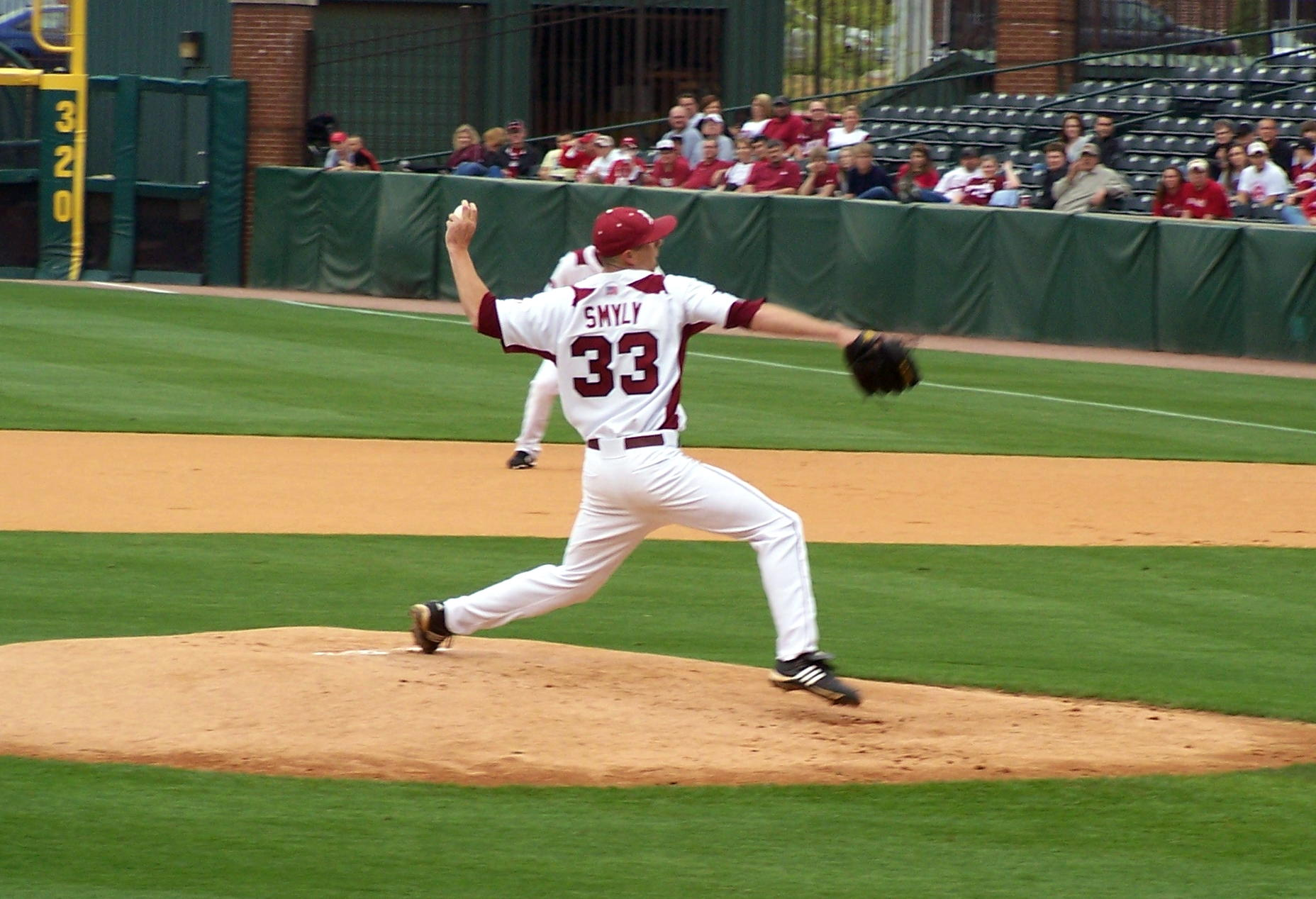
Smyly threw a complete game in the series opener. He struck out seven and allowed five hits with no walks.

The No. 7 Razorbacks swept the No. 25 Georgia Bulldogs. In game one, televised by ESPN2, Drew Smyly limited the Bulldogs to five hits with seven strikeouts and no walks as he went the distance. He got ten runs of support from the Razorback offense, led by an Andy Wilkins home run in the first inning and Bo Bigham, who reached base five times. Game two was another 10–2 win for the Razorbacks behind a strong seven-inning outing by Brett Eibner. The junior from Houston also had four RBI to help his cause. Collin Kuhn went 4 for 5 at the plate, falling a home run short of the cycle. The Razorback offense continued to excel in game three. Freshman Monk Kreder hit his second longball of the year, and Brett Eibner made a fine catch in the second inning to save some Georgia runs. At the conclusion of the Georgia series, Arkansas has won eleven straight games.

==== Oral Roberts ====
Arkansas won its twelfth straight game, 9–5 over the Oral Roberts Golden Eagles. The Razorback offense was led by Brett Eibner, who hit two home runs. Jeremy Heatley moved to 5–0 after earning the win.

==== #4 Florida ====
Sixth-ranked Arkansas traveled to McKethan Stadium for a top-ten SEC showdown with No. 4 Florida. The Hogs beat the Gators five times in 2009. The Razorbacks got home runs from Travis Sample, Bo Bigham and Collin Kuhn, plus ten strikeouts from Drew Smyly to win 8–3. Brett Eibner started game two, but the Gators got six runs in the sixth inning, propelling them to an 8–2 victory. The loss ended the Razorbacks' 13-game winning streak, the program's longest since 1996. Game three was tied 1–1 before Gator freshman Mike Zunino recorded a base hit in the ninth inning that scored Brian Johnson. This walk-off win gave the No. 4 Gators the series.

==== Missouri State ====
Brett Eibner hit his fourteenth home run, and the Razorbacks defeated Missouri State, 5–4, with Harrison-native Jordan Pratt earning the win out of the bullpen. The Hogs used six pitchers in the game.

=== May ===
==== #20 Auburn ====
Arkansas hosted the No. 20 Auburn Tigers in a weekend series at Baum Stadium. The Tigers after losing the first game went on to win the next meetings to win the series. The Razorbacks won the first game of the series 9–4 by overcoming a four run deficit. Smyly won the first game of the series to improve his record to 7–0. The first game saw an attendance of over 7,200. Game two was won by Auburn by a score of 8–7. Arkansas was trailing by 4 going into the bottom of the seventh and brought it down to 2 going into the ninth, but finally lost by one. Fant took his first loss of the season. The attendance was nearly 9,000 for the Saturday afternoon game. The finale was the most disappointing of the three game series. They lost by the score of 13–2. For the tenth time this season Zack Cox had a three hit game, but his performance only produced one RBI. Eibner recorded his fourth loss on the season. Similar to the Saturday game the last game of the series saw over 8,000 fans attend the game Sunday afternoon.

==== #11Ole Miss ====
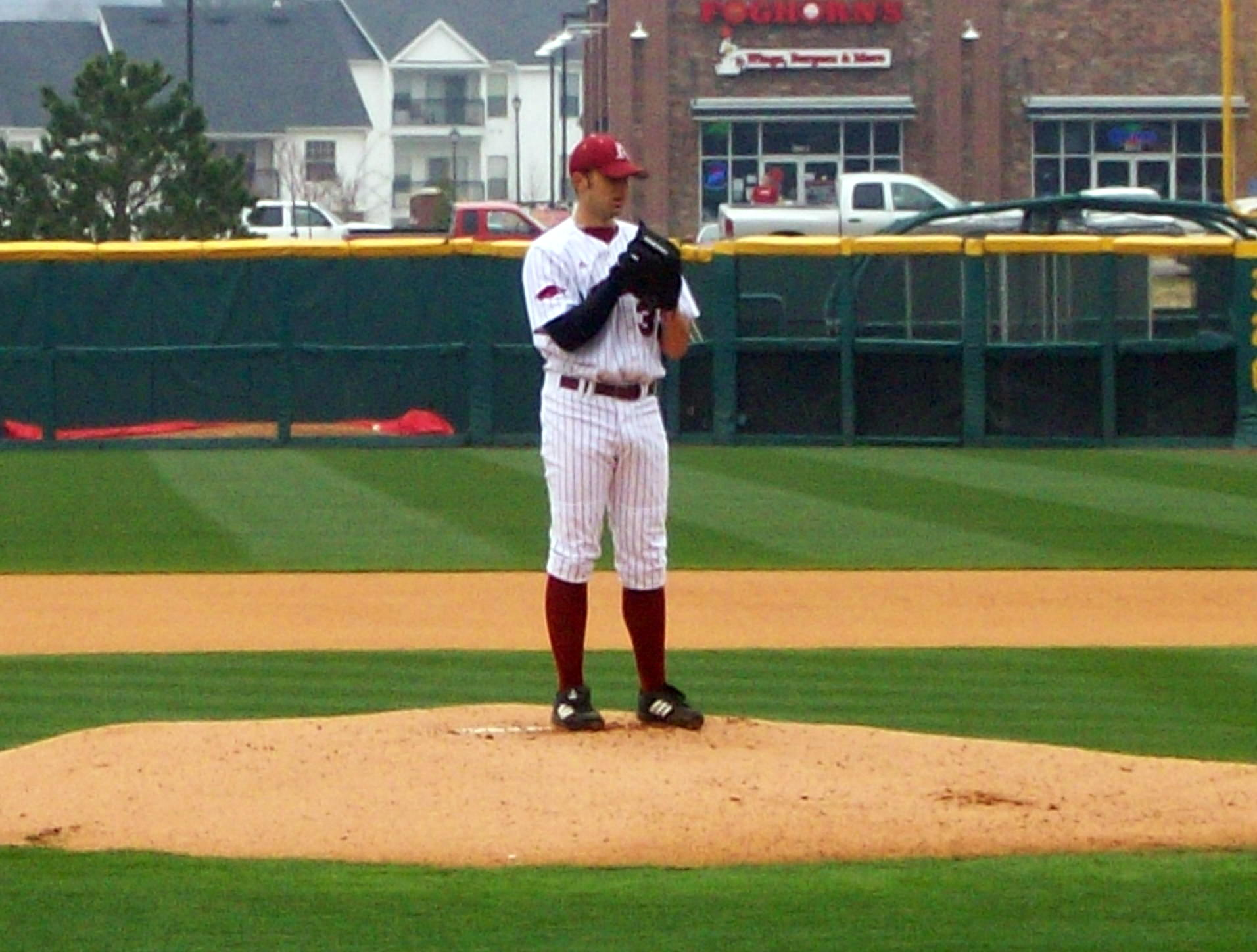
Bolsinger is a McKinney, Texas, native.

Rivals No. 10 Arkansas and No. 11 Ole Miss met for a crucial three-game series at Swayze Field. In game one, Arkansas got home runs from Tim Carver and Brett Eibner, plus a grand slam from Travis Sample. Zack Cox went 3 for 3 (his 30th multi-hit game in 2010) as the Hogs rolled, 11–4. Ole Miss scored three runs in the first two innings, and despite solo shots from Zack Cox and Tom Hauskey, the Rebels took a 3–2 final. Game three belonged to Mike Bolsinger, as the senior pitcher went eight innings with giving up only two hits and striking out eleven. Andy Wilkins had 3 RBI as the Hogs won 7–0. Collin Kuhn broke the single-season school hit by pitch record in game three. He has been hit 23 times. With the win, Arkansas took control of the SEC Western division.

==== Louisiana Tech ====
Arkansas played the Louisiana Tech Bulldogs at Dickey-Stephens Park (home of the Arkansas Travelers). Brett Eibner went 3 for 4, but it was Andy Wilkins that delivered the game winner in the bottom of the tenth. Tech began the game with a four-run second inning, but the Razorbacks battled back and tied the game on an Eibner single to left. Tied at 4–4, Zack Cox reached on a fielder's choice in the tenth inning, and Wilkins singled, giving the Hogs a 5–4 win.

==== #5 South Carolina ====
Leaders of the SEC East and West met in Fayetteville for an SEC showdown. Arkansas was held to three hits by South Carolina in game one, as they lost 3–2. Sam Dyson pitched a complete game shutout for the Gamecocks in two. The Razorbacks left ten runners on base. Arkansas blew an eighth inning lead in game three, losing 5–3.

==== #9 Oklahoma ====
Collin Kuhn had his 24th multi-hit game, but it wasn't enough as the Razorbacks lost to Oklahoma 5–2. Arkansas starter Randall Fant was tagged with the loss.

=== Season summary ===
Arkansas finished second behind Auburn in the SEC Western Division. The Hogs ranked fourth in team batting in the SEC with a .308 batting average. The Razorback pitchers had a 3.88 cumulative ERA, the third-best in the SEC. Zack Cox was the SEC batting champ, hitting .432. He also had 8 home runs and 47 RBI. The Louisville, Kentucky, native was second in total hits with 92, and third in runs scored with 60. Cox broke the school record for hits in game two against South Carolina. Brett Eibner finished third in home runs with 18. Collin Kuhn was fifth in the SEC in total bases with 136. Drew Smyly posted a 2.58 ERA on the year, the third-best mark in the conference. The Little Rock native also recorded 92 strikeouts in 83 2/3 innings, the fourth highest total in the Southeastern Conference.

=== SEC tournament ===
The 2010 SEC baseball tournament began May 26 at Regions Park in Hoover, Alabama. Arkansas was the fourth overall seed, and first played Vanderbilt, who was the fifth seed. Arkansas pitcher Jeremy Heatley, making his first collegiate start, pitched five shutout innings, but the Razorback offense struggled against Sonny Gray. Vanderbilt won 2–0. This means that the Razorbacks were matched up with top-seed Florida the next day in an elimination game. Gator starter Alex Panteliodis retired the first eleven Razorback hitters, and a late Razorbacks rally fell short, 5–4.

=== NCAA tournament: Fayetteville Regional ===
Despite losing 10 of their last 15 games, the Arkansas Razorbacks were named regional hosts. The winner of the Fayetteville Regional will play in the Tempe Super Regional. Arkansas joins Grambling State, Kansas State, and Washington State. The Hogs opened by defeating Grambling on June 4, 19–7. The Razorbacks hit a school record nine home runs as a team, with Brett Eibner going 4 for 5 with 3 HR and 7 RBI. Collin Kuhn, James McCann and Andy Wilkins hit two home runs each in the contest. Washington State defeated Kansas State, 8–6.

== Awards and honors ==
- Bo Bigham

Primetime Performer Weekly Honor Roll by CollegeBaseball360

- Mike Bolsinger

NCBWA Stopper of the Year Watch List
Preseason All-Southeastern Conference, Second team
Dick Howser Trophy Semifinalist
Southeastern Conference Pitcher of the Week
CollegeBaseballInsider.com Southeast Region Pitcher of the Week
CollegeBaseball360 Primetime Performer Weekly Honor Roll

- Tim Carver

Shortstop of the Year Award, College Baseball Foundation – quarterfinalist

- Zack Cox

2010 Baseball America preseason All-America Team, First Team
33rd Golden Spikes Award Watch List
Team captain
SEC Player of the Week
Primetime Performer Weekly Honor Roll by CollegeBaseball360
ESPN The Magazine Academic All-District 6 – first team
Ping!Baseball All-America Second Team
Yahoo! Sports All-American
2010 Pro-Line Athletic/NCBWA All-American

- Brett Eibner

2010 Baseball America preseason All-America Team, First Team
33rd Golden Spikes Award Watch List
Primetime Performer Weekly Honor Roll by CollegeBaseball360
John Olerud Two-Way Player of the Year Award watch list
Ping!Baseball All-America Second Team

- Thomas Hauskey

H. Boyd McWhorter Scholar-Athlete Post-Graduate Scholarship

- Collin Kuhn

Primetime Performer Weekly Honor Roll by CollegeBaseball360

- James McCann

Team captain
ESPN The Magazine Academic All-District 6 – second team

- Drew Smyly

Pitcher of the Year Award, College Baseball Foundation – quarterfinalist

- Matt Vinson

SEC Freshman of the Week

- Andy Wilkins

2010 Louisville Slugger pre-season All-American, Third Team
2010 Baseball America preseason All-America Team, Second Team
Preseason All-Southeastern Conference, First team
Team captain

== Rankings ==
Ranking movement
| Poll | Pre season | February 22 | March 1 | March 8 | March 16 | March 22 | March 29 | April 5 | April 12 | April 19 | April 26 | May 3 | May 10 | May 17 | May 24 | June 1 | June 8 | Final |
|---|---|---|---|---|---|---|---|---|---|---|---|---|---|---|---|---|---|---|
| USA Today/ESPN Coaches' Poll (Top 25) | 16 | 17 | 17 | 15 | 15 | 17 | 13 | 10 | 8 | 7 | 7 | 10 | 10 | | | | | |
| Baseball America (25) | 17 | 17 | 17 | 14 | 13 | 16 | 10 | 10 | 9 | 9 | 9 | 14 | 12 | | | | | |
| Collegiate Baseball (30) | 23 | 30 | 19 | 19 | 16 | 20 | 19 | 16 | 8 | 4 | 8 | 14 | 14 | | | | | |
| NCBWA (30) | 15 | 16 | 15 | 14 | 14 | 16 | 10 | 9 | 7 | 6 | 7 | 10 | 10 | | | | | |
| Rivals.com (25) | 15 | 15 | 15 | 14 | 13 | 15 | 10 | 9 | 5 | 4 | 6 | 9 | 6 | | | | | |
NR = Not ranked

== Razorbacks in the 2010 MLB draft ==
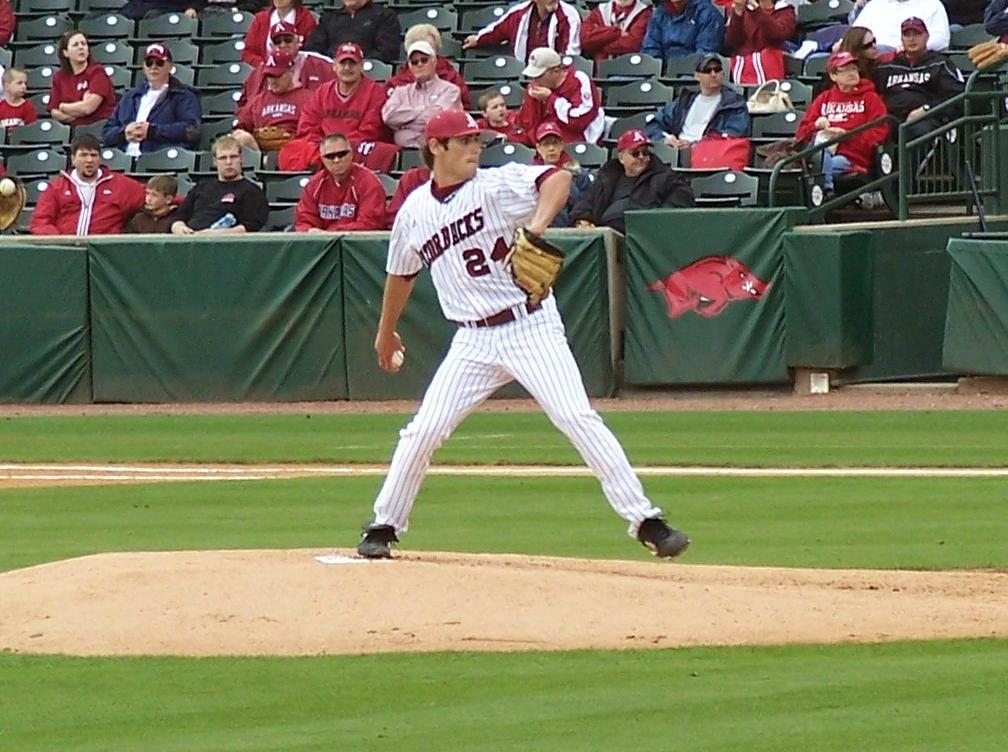
Eibner was also drafted in the fourth round of the 2007 MLB draft by the Houston Astros.

| Player | Position | Round | Overall | MLB team |
|---|---|---|---|---|
| Zack Cox | Third base | 1 | 25 | St. Louis Cardinals |
| Justin O'Connor | Catcher | 1 | 31 | Tampa Bay Rays |
| Brett Eibner | Outfield | 2 | 54 | Kansas City Royals |
| Drew Smyly | Pitcher | 2 | 68 | Detroit Tigers |
| Ryne Stanek | Pitcher | 3 | 99 | Seattle Mariners |
| Andrew Wilkins | First base | 5 | 158 | Chicago White Sox |
| Michael Bolsinger | Pitcher | 15 | 451 | Arizona Diamondbacks |
| Collin Kuhn | Outfield | 15 | 463 | Detroit Tigers |
| Jordan Pratt | Pitcher | 16 | 493 | Detroit Tigers |
| Jeremy Heatley | Pitcher | 22 | 677 | Florida Marlins |
| Jared Lakind | First base | 23 | 687 | Pittsburgh Pirates |
| Dominic Ficociello | Shortstop | 23 | 703 | Detroit Tigers |
Italics denotes an incoming Razorback prospect.
