= 2010 Florida Gators baseball team =

American college baseball season

2010 Florida Gators baseball

SEC regular season champions Gainesville Regional champions Gainesville Super Regional champions

College World Series, 0–2
- Conference: Southeastern Conference

Ranking
- Coaches: No. 8
- CB: No. 8
- Record: 47–17 (22–8 SEC)
- Head coach: Kevin O'Sullivan (3rd year)
- Assistant coach: Craig Bell (3rd year); Brad Weitzel (3rd year)
- Home stadium: Alfred A. McKethan Stadium

2010 Southeastern Conference baseball standings
	Conf.				Overall
Team	W		L	PCT	W		L	PCT
Eastern
No. 7 Florida ^{x}‍†‍‍^{y}	22	–	8	.733	47	–	17	.734
No. 1 South Carolina ‍‍‍^{y}	21	–	9	.700	54	–	16	.771
No. 14 Vanderbilt ‍‍‍^{y}	16	–	12	.571	46	–	20	.697
Kentucky ‍‍‍	13	–	17	.433	31	–	25	.554
Tennessee ‍‍‍	12	–	18	.400	30	–	26	.536
Georgia ‍‍‍	5	–	23	.179	16	–	37	.302
Western
No. 19 Auburn ^{x}‍‍‍^{y}	20	–	10	.667	43	–	21	.672
No. 13 Arkansas ‍‍‍^{y}	18	–	12	.600	43	–	21	.672
Ole Miss ‍‍‍^{y}	16	–	14	.533	39	–	24	.619
No. 16 Alabama ‍‍‍^{y}	15	–	15	.500	42	–	25	.627
LSU ‍‍‡‍^{y}	14	–	16	.467	41	–	22	.651
Mississippi State ‍‍‍	6	–	24	.200	23	–	33	.411
x – Division champion † – Conference champion ‡ – Tournament champion y – Invited to the NCAA tournament As of June 29, 2010; Rankings from Baseball America

The 2010 Florida Gators baseball team represented the University of Florida in the sport of baseball during the 2010 college baseball season. The Gators competed in Division I of the National Collegiate Athletic Association (NCAA) and the Eastern Division of the Southeastern Conference (SEC). They played their home games at Alfred A. McKethan Stadium, on the university's Gainesville, Florida campus. The team was coached by Kevin O'Sullivan, who was in his third season at Florida.

== Roster ==
2010 Florida Gators baseball team
Players
Coaches

#	Pos.	Name	B/T	Height	Weight	Year	Home town
30	RHP	Grant Abadal	R/R	6 ft 4 in (1.93 m)	205 lb (93 kg)	Jr	St. Petersburg, FL
2	INF	Josh Adams	R/R	5 ft 11 in (1.8 m)	195 lb (88 kg)	Jr	Jacksonville, FL
28	RHP	Jeff Barfield	R/R	6 ft 0 in (1.83 m)	215 lb (98 kg)	Sr	Perry, GA
34	RHP	Ben Brown	R/R	5 ft 10 in (1.78 m)	175 lb (79 kg)	Fr	Clearwater, FL
29	RHP	Matt Campbell	R/R	6 ft 2 in (1.88 m)	190 lb (86 kg)	Jr	Tampa, FL
6	LHP	Kevin Chapman	L/L	6 ft 4 in (1.93 m)	215 lb (98 kg)	Jr	Coral Springs, FL
17	OF	Matt den Dekker	L/L	6 ft 1 in (1.85 m)	210 lb (95 kg)	Sr	Fort Lauderdale, FL
20	INF	Cody Dent	L/R	5 ft 11 in (1.8 m)	180 lb (82 kg)	Fr	Boynton Beach, FL
16	RHP	Anthony DeSclafani	R/R	6 ft 2 in (1.88 m)	195 lb (88 kg)	So	Freehold, NJ
4	INF	Nolan Fontana	L/R	5 ft 11 in (1.8 m)	190 lb (86 kg)	Fr	Winter Garden, FL
49	RHP	Clint Franklin	R/R	6 ft 3 in (1.91 m)	210 lb (95 kg)	Sr	Orlando, FL
27	RHP	Michael Heller	R/R	6 ft 2 in (1.88 m)	200 lb (91 kg)	Fr	Bradenton, FL
35	LHP	Brian Johnson	L/L	6 ft 3 in (1.91 m)	225 lb (102 kg)	Fr	Cocoa Beach, FL
37	RHP	Greg Larson	R/R	6 ft 8 in (2.03 m)	225 lb (102 kg)	So	Longwood, FL
10	INF	Austin Maddox	R/R	6 ft 3 in (1.91 m)	230 lb (104 kg)	Fr	Jacksonville, FL
26	LHP	Nick Maronde	S/L	6 ft 3 in (1.91 m)	210 lb (95 kg)	So	Lexington, KY
15	C	Ben McMahan	R/R	6 ft 0 in (1.83 m)	210 lb (95 kg)	So	Windermere, FL
24	LHP	Alex Panteliodis	L/L	6 ft 2 in (1.88 m)	235 lb (107 kg)	So	Tampa, FL
8	OF	Daniel Pigott	R/R	6 ft 2 in (1.88 m)	205 lb (93 kg)	So	Ormond Beach, FL
9	OF	Jonathan Pigott	R/R	6 ft 2 in (1.88 m)	205 lb (93 kg)	Sr	Ormond Beach, FL
21	RHP	Justin Poovey	R/R	6 ft 0 in (1.83 m)	200 lb (91 kg)	So	Granite Falls, NC
11	RHP	Hudson Randall	R/R	6 ft 3 in (1.91 m)	180 lb (82 kg)	Fr	Atlanta, GA
32	LHP	Steven Rodriguez	L/L	6 ft 2 in (1.88 m)	230 lb (104 kg)	Fr	Miami, FL
5	INF	Jandy Rosabal	R/R	5 ft 10 in (1.78 m)	165 lb (75 kg)	Sr	Miami, FL
1	INF	Bryson Smith	R/R	6 ft 2 in (1.88 m)	200 lb (91 kg)	Jr	Watkinsville, GA
23	RHP	Chas Spottswood	R/R	6 ft 4 in (1.93 m)	200 lb (91 kg)	Sr	Key West, FL
18	OF	Tyler Thompson	L/R	6 ft 1 in (1.85 m)	190 lb (86 kg)	So	Tequesta, FL
22	C	Hampton Tignor	R/R	6 ft 1 in (1.85 m)	195 lb (88 kg)	Sr	Sarasota, FL
13	RHP	Tommy Toledo	R/R	6 ft 3 in (1.91 m)	190 lb (86 kg)	So	Tampa, FL
25	INF	Preston Tucker	L/L	6 ft 0 in (1.83 m)	215 lb (98 kg)	So	Tampa, FL
14	OF	Kamm Washington	L/L	5 ft 10 in (1.78 m)	180 lb (82 kg)	Fr	Boynton Beach, FL
12	INF	Jerico Weitzel	L/R	5 ft 11 in (1.8 m)	200 lb (91 kg)	So	Ridgway, PA
31	OF	Paul Wilson	R/R	6 ft 0 in (1.83 m)	190 lb (86 kg)	Jr	Lakeland, FL
3	C	Mike Zunino	R/R	6 ft 2 in (1.88 m)	220 lb (100 kg)	Fr	Cape Coral, FL

Head coach

7 Kevin O'Sullivan

Assistant coach(es)

33 Craig Bell
42 Brad Weitzel

Legend

- (C) Team captain
- (S) Suspended
- (I) Ineligible
- Injured
- Current redshirt

Roster

== Schedule ==
2010 Florida Gators baseball game log
Regular season
February

Date	Opponent	Rank	Stadium Site	Score	Win	Loss	Save	Attendance	Overall Record	SEC Record
February 19	South Florida	No. 9	McKethan Stadium	6–2	Panteliodis (1–0)	Fontanez (0–1)	Larson (1)	3,309	1–0	–
February 20	South Florida	No. 9	McKethan Stadium	9–1	Johnson (1–0)	Delphey (0–1)	None	3,723	2–0	–
February 21	South Florida	No. 9	McKethan Stadium	7–6^{10}	Panteliodis (2–0)	Quackenbush (0–1)	None	3,422	3–0	–
February 24	UCF	No. 9	McKethan Stadium	7–6	Randall (1–0)	Adkins (0–1)	Chapman (1)	2,521	4–0	–
February 25	Siena	No. 9	McKethan Stadium	13–3	Toledo (1–0)	Tedesco (0–1)	None	2,879	5–0	–

March

Date	Opponent	Rank	Stadium Site	Score	Win	Loss	Save	Attendance	Overall Record	SEC Record
March 2	vs. No. 3 Florida State; Rivalry	No. 6	Steinbrenner Field; Tampa, FL	5–10	Parker (1–0)	DeSclafani (0–1)	Bennett (1)	8,348	5–1	–
March 5	at No. 14 Miami (FL); Rivalry	No. 6	Alex Rodriguez Park; Coral Gables, FL	7–1	Panteliodis (3–0)	Hernandez (1–1)	Maronde (1)	4,274	6–1	–
March 6	at No. 14 Miami (FL); Rivalry	No. 6	Alex Rodriguez Park	6–9	Whaley (2–0)	Johnson (1–1)	Gutierrez (3)	4,426	6–2	–
March 7	at No. 14 Miami (FL); Rivalry	No. 6	Alex Rodriguez Park	4–2	Toledo (2–0)	Erickson (1–1)	Chapman (2)	4,610	7–2	–
March 9	Illinois State	No. 8	McKethan Stadium	8–2	Randall (2–0)	Sorkin (0–1)	None	2,435	8–2	–
March 10	Illinois State	No. 8	McKethan Stadium	8–0	DeSclafani (1–1)	Learnard (0–1)	None	2,458	9–2	–
March 12	Charleston Southern	No. 8	McKethan Stadium	6–0	Panteliodis (4–0)	Markham (0–2)	None	2,209	10–2	–
March 13	Charleston Southern	No. 8	McKethan Stadium	16-10	Poovey (1–0)	McCready (0–3)	Barfield (1)	2,993	11–2	–
March 14	Charleston Southern	No. 8	McKethan Stadium	3–6	Thornburg (3–1)	Toledo (2–1)	None	2,784	11–3	–
March 15	Army	No. 11	McKethan Stadium	9–3	DeSclafani (2–1)	Kirk (0–2)	Barfield (2)	2,073	12–3	–
March 16	No. 5 Florida State; Rivalry	No. 11	McKethan Stadium	8–5	Maronde (1–0)	Scantling (0–1)	Chapman (3)	4,773	13–3	–
March 19	Mississippi State	No. 11	McKethan Stadium	7–2	Panteliodis (5–0)	Graveman (1–1)	None	3,482	14–3	1–0
March 20	Mississippi State	No. 11	McKethan Stadium	5–4	Maronde (2–0)	Girodo (0–1)	Chapman (4)	4,823	15–3	2–0
March 21	Mississippi State	No. 11	McKethan Stadium	4–1	Chapman (1–0)	Reed (0–2)	None	2,410	16–3	3–0
March 24	Florida Gulf Coast	No. 9	McKethan Stadium	13–8	Franklin (1–0)	Barnes (0–1)	None	3,390	17–3	–
March 26	at No. 18 Ole Miss	No. 9	Swayze Field; Oxford, MS	2–3	Pomeranz (4–0)	Panteliodis (5–1)	Huber (2)	8,417	17–4	3–1
March 27	at No. 18 Ole Miss	No. 9	Swayze Field	3–15	Barrett (6–0)	Randall (2–1)	Crouse (1)	8,699	17–5	3–2
March 28	at No. 18 Ole Miss	No. 9	Swayze Field	13–1	Johnson (2–1)	Rothlin (3–2)	None	6,116	18–5	4–2
March 30	vs. No. 6 Florida State; Rivalry	No. 11	Baseball Grounds; Jacksonville, FL	2–7	Busch (4–0)	Randall (2–2)	None	9,276	18–6	–

April

Date	Opponent	Rank	Stadium Site	Score	Win	Loss	Save	Attendance	Overall Record	SEC Record
April 2	No. 17 Vanderbilt	No. 11	McKethan Stadium	3–2	Barfield (1–0)	Gray (4–3)	Chapman (5)	4,093	19–6	5–2
April 3	No. 17 Vanderbilt	No. 11	McKethan Stadium	7–3	Johnson (3–1)	Hill (3–2)	None	3,684	20–6	6–2
April 4	No. 17 Vanderbilt	No. 11	McKethan Stadium	0–7	Armstrong (4–0)	Randall (2–3)	None	2,973	20–7	6–3
April 6	Jacksonville	No. 9	McKethan Stadium	12–2	Larson (1–0)	Glenn (2–4)	None	3,515	21–7	–
April 9	at Tennessee	No. 9	Lindsey Nelson Stadium; Knoxville, TN	4–2	Panteliodis (6–1)	Morgado (2–4)	Chapman (6)	2,519	22–7	7–3
April 10	at Tennessee	No. 9	Lindsey Nelson Stadium	4–12	McCray (4–3)	Johnson (3–2)	None	2,493	22–8	7–4
April 11	at Tennessee	No. 9	Lindsey Nelson Stadium	9–1	Randall (3–3)	Gruver (1–2)	None	2,302	23–8	8–4
April 13	at No. 7 Florida State; Rivalry	No. 9	Dick Howser Stadium; Tallahassee, FL	2–3	Sitz (3–0)	Larson (1–1)	McGee (7)	6,526	23–9	–
April 16	at Kentucky	No. 9	Cliff Hagan Stadium; Lexington, KY	10–8	Barfield (2–0)	Cooper (1–3)	Chapman (7)	1,996	24–9	9–4
April 17	at Kentucky	No. 9	Cliff Hagan Stadium	6–3	Larson (2–1)	Rogers (4–4)	None	2,363	25–9	10–4
April 18	at Kentucky	No. 9	Cliff Hagan Stadium	5–6	Cooper (2–3)	DeSclafani (2–2)	Little (6)	2,293	25–10	10–5
April 21	at South Florida	No. 11	Red McEwen Field; Tampa, FL	18–8	Spottswood (1–0)	Parker (0–2)	None	2,517	26–10	–
April 23	No. 7 Arkansas	No. 11	McKethan Stadium	3–8	Smyly (6–0)	Panteliodis (6–2)	None	3,622	26–11	10–6
April 24	No. 7 Arkansas	No. 11	McKethan Stadium	8–2	Randall (4–3)	Eibner (3–3)	Larson (2)	3,116	27–11	11–6
April 25	No. 7 Arkansas	No. 11	McKethan Stadium	2–1	Chapman (2–0)	Bolsinger (4–2)	None	2,873	28–11	12–6
April 30	No. 9 LSU	No. 12	McKethan Stadium	8–5	Panteliodis (7–2)	Ranaudo (2–2)	Chapman (8)	4,213	29–11	13–6

May

Date	Opponent	Rank	Stadium Site	Score	Win	Loss	Save	Attendance	Overall Record	SEC Record
May 1	No. 9 LSU	No. 12	McKethan Stadium	7–3	Randall (5–3)	Matulis (5–2)	None	4,003	30–11	14–6
May 2	No. 9 LSU	No. 12	McKethan Stadium	13–6	Johnson (4–2)	Ott (1–2)	None	3,617	31–11	15–6
May 7	at Alabama	No. 6	Sewell–Thomas Stadium; Tuscaloosa, AL	9–3	Randall (6–3)	Morgan (5–3)	None	4,387	32–11	16–6
May 8	at Alabama	No. 6	Sewell–Thomas Stadium	14–8	Panteliodis (8–2)	Nelson (5–2)	None	4,273	33–11	17–6
May 9	at Alabama	No. 6	Sewell–Thomas Stadium	8–10	Kilcrease (4–2)	DeSclafani (2–3)	Smith (3)	4,317	33–12	17–7
May 12	Florida Atlantic	No. 5	McKethan Stadium	7–3	Barfield (3–0)	Garton (6–2)	None	3,147	34–12	–
May 14	Georgia	No. 5	McKethan Stadium	4–3	Larson (3–1)	Moseley (0–4)	None	5,363	35–12	18–7
May 15	Georgia	No. 5	McKethan Stadium	4–3	Chapman (3–0)	Esmonde (2–1)	None	4,932	36–12	19–7
May 16	Georgia	No. 5	McKethan Stadium	9–3	Johnson (5–2)	Palazzone (4–6)	None	4,324	37–12	20–7
May 18	North Florida	No. 5	McKethan Stadium	9–3	Toledo (3–1)	Patton (1–2)	None	3,314	38–12	–
May 20	at No. 7 South Carolina	No. 5	Carolina Stadium; Columbia, SC	3–2	Barfield (4–0)	Cooper (10–1)	Chapman (9)	8,188	39–12	21–7
May 21	at No. 7 South Carolina	No. 5	Carolina Stadium	5–2	Rodriguez (1–0)	Dyson (5–5)	Chapman (10)	8,242	40–12	22–7
May 22	at No. 7 South Carolina	No. 5	Carolina Stadium	6–11	Brown (3–0)	Johnson (5–3)	None	7,523	40–13	22–8

Postseason
SEC Tournament

Date	Opponent	Rank	Stadium Site	Score	Win	Loss	Save	Attendance	Overall Record	SECT Record
May 26	vs. LSU	No. 5	Regions Park; Hoover, AL	6–10	Ranaudo (4–2)	Johnson (5–4)	None	6,772	40–14	0–1
May 27	vs. No. 12 Arkansas	No. 5	Regions Park	5–4	Panteliodis (9–2)	Bolsinger (6–4)	Chapman (11)	5,759	41–14	1–1
May 28	vs. No. 17 Vanderbilt	No. 5	Regions Park	5–2	Randall (7–3)	Armstrong (7–3)	Rodriguez (1)	7,605	42–14	2–1
May 29	vs. Alabama	No. 5	Regions Park	2–5^{7}	Morgan (6–4)	Toledo (3–2)	None	11,542	42–15	2–2

NCAA tournament: Gainesville Regional

Date	Opponent	Rank	Stadium Site	Score	Win	Loss	Save	Attendance	Overall Record	Regional Record
June 4	Bethune–Cookman	No. 5	McKethan Stadium	7–3	Randall (8–3)	Simpson (6–2)	None	3,217	43–15	1–0
June 5	Oregon State	No. 5	McKethan Stadium	10–2	Panteliodis (10–2)	Gaviglio (3–4)	None	2,991	44–15	2–0
June 6	Florida Atlantic	No. 5	McKethan Stadium	15–0	Johnson (6–4)	Everist (2–8)	None	2,302	45–15	3–0

NCAA tournament: Gainesville Super Regional

Date	Opponent	Rank	Stadium Site	Score	Win	Loss	Save	Attendance	Overall Record	Super Reg. Record
June 11	No. 14 Miami (FL); Rivalry	No. 5	McKethan Stadium	7–2	Panteliodis (11–2)	Gutierrez (5–3)	None	5,429	46–15	1–0
June 12	No. 14 Miami (FL); Rivalry	No. 5	McKethan Stadium	4–3^{10}	Rodriguez (2–0)	Miranda (5–3)	Larson (3)	5,783	47–15	2–0

College World Series

Date	Opponent	Rank	Stadium Site	Score	Win	Loss	Save	Attendance	Overall Record	CWS Record
June 19	vs. No. 7 UCLA	No. 5	Rosenblatt Stadium; Omaha, NE	3–11	Bauer (11–3)	Panteliodis (11–3)	None	23,271	47–16	0–1
June 21	vs. No. 12 Florida State; Rivalry	No. 5	Rosenblatt Stadium	5–8	Busch (6–2)	Randall (8–4)	McGee (13)	19,841	47–17	0–2

Rankings from USA Today/ESPN Coaches' Poll. All times Eastern. Retrieved from FloridaGators.com

== See also ==
- Florida Gators
- List of Florida Gators baseball players
