= 2010 Southeastern Conference baseball tournament =

- Teams: 8
- Format: Double elimination with flipped brackets
- Finals site: Regions Park; Hoover, Alabama
- Champions: LSU (9th title)
- Winning coach: Paul Mainieri (3rd title)
- MVP: Austin Nola (LSU)
- Attendance: 126,071

The 2010 Southeastern Conference baseball tournament was held at Regions Park in Hoover, AL from May 26 through 30. LSU won the tournament for the third straight season and earned the Southeastern Conference's automatic bid to the NCAA tournament.

== Regular season results ==
The top eight teams (based on conference results) from the conference earned invites to the tournament.

Eastern Division
Team	W	L	T	Pct	GB	Seed
Florida	22	8		.733	-	1
South Carolina	21	9		.700	1	3
Vanderbilt	16	12		.571	4	5
Kentucky	13	17		.433	9	-
Tennessee	12	18		.400	10	-
Georgia	5	23		.179	15	-

Western Division
Team	W	L	T	Pct	GB	Seed
Auburn	20	10		.667	-	2
Arkansas	18	12		.600	2	4
Ole Miss	16	14		.533	4	6
Alabama	15	15		.500	5	7
LSU	14	16		.467	6	8
Mississippi State	6	24		.200	14	-

- Eliminated from SEC Tournament Contention
Standings after 5/22

== Format ==
The 2010 tournament will once again feature a "flipped bracket". This means that after two days of play the undefeated team from each bracket will move into the other bracket. This reduces the number of rematches teams will have to play in order to win the tournament. Additionally, the tournament will be debuting a "pitch clock," limiting the amount of time that pitchers have to throw the ball to 20 seconds. This rule will not be in effect when runners are on base.

== Tournament ==
First round
7	Alabama	7
2	Auburn	1
6	Ole Miss	3
3	South Carolina	0
2	Auburn	3*
3	South Carolina	1*
8	LSU	10
1	Florida	6
5	Vanderbilt	2
4	Arkansas	0
4	Arkansas	3
1	Florida	5

Second round
7	Alabama	6
6	Ole Miss	3
6	Ole Miss	10*
2	Auburn	7*
8	LSU	7
5	Vanderbilt	5
1	Florida	5
5	Vanderbilt	2

Semifinals
6	Ole Miss	0	-
8	LSU	8	-
1	Florida	2	-
7	Alabama	5	-

Final
8	LSU	4*
7	Alabama	3*

- After two days of play, the undefeated team from each bracket moved to the other bracket.
- *Game went to extra innings
- ^Game ended after 7 innings because of mercy rule
- All semi-final games were 7 innings due to inclement weather in the Hoover area.

== All-Tournament Team ==
Position	Player	School
1B	Blake Dean	LSU
2B	Tyler Hanover	LSU
3B	Jake Smith	Alabama
SS	Austin Nola	LSU
C	Brock Bennett	Alabama
OF	Mikie Mahtook	LSU
OF	Matt den Dekker	Florida
DH	Aaron Westlake	Vanderbilt
P	Ben Alsup	LSU
P	Jimmy Nelson	Alabama
MVP	Austin Nola	LSU

== See also ==
- College World Series
- NCAA Division I Baseball Championship
- Southeastern Conference baseball tournament
