= 2010 Oklahoma Sooners baseball team =

American college baseball season

2010 Oklahoma Sooners baseball

NCAA Charlottesville Super Regional champions NCAA Norman Regional champions

College World Series, 1–2
- Conference: Big 12 Conference
- Record: 50–18 (15–10 Big 12)
- Head coach: Sunny Golloway (6th year)
- Home stadium: L. Dale Mitchell Baseball Park

2010 Big 12 Conference baseball standings
	Conf.						Overall
Team	W		L		T	PCT	W		L		T	PCT
No. 9 Texas ‍†‍‍^{y}	24	–	3	–	0	.889	50	–	13	–	0	.794
No. 5 Oklahoma ‍‍‍^{y}	15	–	10	–	0	.600	50	–	18	–	0	.735
Kansas State ‍‍‍^{y}	14	–	12	–	0	.538	37	–	22	–	0	.627
No. 18 Texas A&M ‍‍‡‍^{y}	14	–	12	–	1	.537	43	–	21	–	1	.669
Texas Tech ‍‍‍	13	–	14	–	0	.481	28	–	29	–	0	.491
Baylor ‍‍‍^{y}	12	–	13	–	0	.480	36	–	24	–	0	.600
Kansas ‍‍‍	11	–	15	–	1	.426	31	–	27	–	1	.534
Missouri ‍‍‍	10	–	16	–	0	.385	29	–	26	–	0	.527
Nebraska ‍‍‍	10	–	17	–	0	.370	27	–	27	–	0	.500
Oklahoma State ‍‍‍	8	–	19	–	0	.296	29	–	26	–	0	.527
† – Conference champion ‡ – Tournament champion y – Invited to the NCAA tournament Rankings from Collegiate Baseball

The 2010 Oklahoma Sooners baseball team represented the University of Oklahoma in the 2010 NCAA Division I baseball season. The Sooners played their home games at L. Dale Mitchell Baseball Park, and played as part of the Big 12 Conference. The team was coached by Sunny Golloway in his sixth season as head coach at Oklahoma.

The Sooners reached the College World Series, their tenth appearance in Omaha, where they finished tied for 5th place after a win against eventual champion South Carolina and losses to Clemson and South Carolina.

== Personnel ==
=== Roster ===
2010 Oklahoma Sooners roster
Pitchers: 12 - Jeremy Erben - Senior; 14 - Brandon Bargas - Freshman; 16 - Bobby Shore - Junior; 17 - Ryan Duke - Junior; 19 - Jordan John - Freshman; 20 - Drew VerHagen - Freshman; 21 - Derek Vaughn - Sophomore; 23 - Jason Chowning - Senior; 27 - J. Robinson - Senior; 32 - Zach Neal - Junior; 34 - Jarrett Semler - Senior; 43 - Ryan Gibson - Freshman; 44 - Michael Rocha - Junior; 46 - Anthony Collazo - Junior	Catchers: 25 - Bryan Groth - Senior; 28 - Ross Hubbard - Senior; 35 - Tyler Ogle - Sophomore; Outfielders: 1 - Chris Ellison - Sophomore; 3 - Casey Johnson - Junior; 6 - Erik Ross - Sophomore; 10 - Ricky Eisenberg - Junior; 13 - Tyler Brady - Junior; 13 - Cody Reine - Sophomore; 18 - Kaleb Herren - Senior; 26 - Jarek Pritchard - Freshman; 39 - Elliot Blair - Junior	Infielders: 2 - Cale Ellis - Junior; 4 - Chad Kettler - Freshman; 5 - Caleb Bushyhead - Sophomore; 7 - Max White - Freshman; 8 - Jack Mayfield - Freshman; 9 - Danny Black - Junior; 33 - Cameron Seitzer - Sophomore; 38 - Garrett Buechele - Sophomore; 45 - Drew Harrison - Freshman; Unknown: - Michael Whitney

=== Coaches ===
2010 Oklahoma Sooners baseball coaching staff
- - Sunny Golloway - Head coach - 6th season
- - Tim Tadlock - Assistant coach - 5th season
- - Mike Bell - Assistant coach - 3rd season

== Schedule and results ==
Legend
Oklahoma win
Oklahoma loss

2010 Oklahoma Sooners baseball game log
Regular season

February
Date	Opponent	Rank (Seed)	Site/Stadium	Score	Overall Record	Big 12 Record
Feb 19	at San Diego State*	No. 25	Tony Gwynn Stadium • San Diego, CA	W 7–4	1–0	
Feb 20	at San Diego State*	No. 25	Tony Gwynn Stadium • San Diego, CA	W 17–5	2–0	
Feb 20	at San Diego State*	No. 25	Tony Gwynn Stadium • San Diego, CA	W 9–5	3–0	
Feb 21	at San Diego State*	No. 25	Tony Gwynn Stadium • San Diego, CA	W 5–2	4–0	
Feb 26	vs Valparaiso*	No. 20	John Sessions Stadium • Jacksonville, FL (Jacksonville Invitational)	W 12–9	5–0	
Feb 27	at Jacksonville*	No. 20	John Sessions Stadium • Jacksonville, FL (Jacksonville Invitational)	L 3–4	5–1	
Feb 28	vs Richmond*	No. 20	John Sessions Stadium • Jacksonville, FL (Jacksonville Invitational)	W 11–3	6–1	

March
Date	Opponent	Rank (Seed)	Site/Stadium	Score	Overall Record	Big 12 Record
Mar 2	UT Arlington*	No. 17	L. Dale Mitchell Baseball Park • Norman, OK	W 4–3	7–1	
Mar 4	South Florida*	No. 17	L. Dale Mitchell Baseball Park • Norman, OK (Sooner Classic)	W 5–4	8–1	
Mar 5	Western Illinois*	No. 17	L. Dale Mitchell Baseball Park • Norman, OK (Sooner Classic)	W 12–1	9–1	
Mar 6	South Florida*	No. 17	L. Dale Mitchell Baseball Park • Norman, OK (Sooner Classic)	W 4–3	10–1	
Mar 7	Stephen F. Austin*	No. 17	L. Dale Mitchell Baseball Park • Norman, OK (Sooner Classic)	W 5–4	11–1	
Mar 9	at Dallas Baptist*	No. 16	Patriot Field • Dallas, TX	W 8–4	12–1	
Mar 10	Houston Baptist*	No. 16	L. Dale Mitchell Baseball Park • Norman, OK	W 9–1	13–1	
Mar 12	vs Mississippi State*	No. 16	Whataburger Field • Corpus Christi, TX (Whataburger Classic)	W 16–5	14–1	
Mar 13	vs Texas A&M–Corpus Christi*	No. 16	Whataburger Field • Corpus Christi, TX (Whataburger Classic)	W 11–2	15–1	
Mar 14	vs No. 10 UCLA*	No. 16	Whataburger Field • Corpus Christi, TX (Whataburger Classic)	L 2–5	15–2	
Mar 16	UMass*	No. 14	L. Dale Mitchell Baseball Park • Norman, OK	W 4–2	16–2	
Mar 17	UMass*	No. 14	L. Dale Mitchell Baseball Park • Norman, OK	W 8–4	17–2	
Mar 19	Baylor	No. 14	L. Dale Mitchell Baseball Park • Norman, OK	W 7–6	18–2	1–0
Mar 26	at Nebraska	No. 13	Haymarket Park • Lincoln, NE	W 10–2	19–2	2–0
Mar 27	at Nebraska	No. 13	Haymarket Park • Lincoln, NE	W 4–1	20–2	3–0
Mar 28	at Nebraska	No. 13	Haymarket Park • Lincoln, NE	L 0–10	20–3	3–1
Mar 30	Arkansas–Pine Bluff*	No. 9	L. Dale Mitchell Baseball Park • Norman, OK	W 26–3	21–3	
Mar 31	Arkansas–Pine Bluff*	No. 9	L. Dale Mitchell Baseball Park • Norman, OK	W 16–1	22–3	

April
Date	Opponent	Rank (Seed)	Site/Stadium	Score	Overall Record	Big 12 Record
Apr 1	No. 7 Texas	No. 9	L. Dale Mitchell Baseball Park • Norman, OK	L 0–5	22–4	3–2
Apr 2	No. 7 Texas	No. 9	L. Dale Mitchell Baseball Park • Norman, OK	L 0–2	22–5	3–3
Apr 3	No. 7 Texas	No. 9	L. Dale Mitchell Baseball Park • Norman, OK	L 3–9	22–6	3–4
Apr 6	at No. 18 TCU*	No. 12	Lupton Stadium • Fort Worth, TX	W 4–2	23–7	
Apr 9	Missouri	No. 12	L. Dale Mitchell Baseball Park • Norman, OK	W 6–4	24–7	4–4
Apr 10	Missouri	No. 12	L. Dale Mitchell Baseball Park • Norman, OK	W 10–4	25–7	5–4
Apr 11	Missouri	No. 12	L. Dale Mitchell Baseball Park • Norman, OK	L 11–12	25–8	5–5
Apr 13	at Oklahoma State*	No. 11	Allie P. Reynolds Stadium • Stillwater, OK	L 6–7	25–9	
Apr 17	at Texas Tech	No. 11	Dan Law Park • Lubbock, TX	W 12–1	26–9	6–5
Apr 17	at Texas Tech	No. 11	Dan Law Park • Lubbock, TX	L 3–7	26–10	6–6
Apr 18	at Texas Tech	No. 11	Dan Law Park • Lubbock, TX	L 3–8	26–11	6–7
Apr 20	No. 14 TCU*	No. 20	L. Dale Mitchell Baseball Park • Norman, OK	W 8–3	27–11	
Apr 23	at Texas A&M	No. 20	Olsen Field • College Station, TX	L 2–6	27–12	6–8
Apr 24	at Texas A&M	No. 20	Olsen Field • College Station, TX	W 6–5	28–12	7–8
Apr 25	at Texas A&M	No. 20	Olsen Field • College Station, TX	W 10–2	29–12	8–8
Apr 27	Dallas Baptist*	No. 19	L. Dale Mitchell Baseball Park • Norman, OK	W 14–0	30–12	
Apr 30	No. 22 Kansas State	No. 19	L. Dale Mitchell Baseball Park • Norman, OK	W 14–3	31–12	9–8

May
Date	Opponent	Rank (Seed)	Site/Stadium	Score	Overall Record	Big 12 Record
May 1	No. 22 Kansas State	No. 19	L. Dale Mitchell Baseball Park • Norman, OK	L 9–14	31–13	9–9
May 2	No. 22 Kansas State	No. 19	L. Dale Mitchell Baseball Park • Norman, OK	W 15–11	32–13	10–9
May 4	Little Rock*	No. 17	L. Dale Mitchell Baseball Park • Norman, OK	W 14–5	33–13	
May 7	vs Oklahoma State	No. 17	Oneok Field • Tulsa, OK	W 7–6	34–13	11–9
May 8	vs Oklahoma State	No. 17	AT&T Bricktown Ballpark • Oklahoma City, OK	L 3–4	34–14	11–10
May 9	vs Oklahoma State	No. 17	AT&T Bricktown Ballpark • Oklahoma City, OK	W 6–0	35–14	12–10
May 14	Memphis*	No. 16	L. Dale Mitchell Baseball Park • Norman, OK	L 3–4	35–15	
May 15	Memphis*	No. 16	L. Dale Mitchell Baseball Park • Norman, OK	W 14–6	36–15	
May 16	Memphis*	No. 16	L. Dale Mitchell Baseball Park • Norman, OK	W 9–2	37–15	
May 18	No. 18 Arkansas*	No. 14	L. Dale Mitchell Baseball Park • Norman, OK	W 5–2	38–15	
May 19	Texas Southern*	No. 14	L. Dale Mitchell Baseball Park • Norman, OK	W 13–1	39–15	
May 21	at Kansas	No. 14	Hoglund Ballpark • Lawrence, KS	W 14–4	40–15	13–10
May 22	at Kansas	No. 14	Hoglund Ballpark • Lawrence, KS	W 8–7	41–15	14–10
May 23	at Kansas	No. 14	Hoglund Ballpark • Lawrence, KS	W 9–6	42–15	15–10

Postseason

Big 12 Tournament
Date	Opponent	Rank (Seed)	Site/Stadium	Score	Overall Record	Big 12T Record
May 26	(7) Kansas	No. 13 (2)	AT&T Bricktown Ballpark • Oklahoma City, OK	W 3–2	43–14	1–0
May 28	(6) Baylor	No. 13 (2)	All Sports Stadium • Oklahoma City, OK	L 3–8	43–15	1–1
May 29	(3) Kansas State	No. 13 (2)	All Sports Stadium • Oklahoma City, OK	W 13–2^{8}	44–15	2–1

NCAA Norman Regional
Date	Opponent	Rank (Seed)	Site/Stadium	Score	Overall Record	Reg Record
June 4	(4) Oral Roberts	No. 13 (1)	L. Dale Mitchell Baseball Park • Norman, OK	W 7–6^{10}	45–15	1–0
June 5	(3) North Carolina	No. 13 (1)	L. Dale Mitchell Baseball Park • Norman, OK	W 7–6^{10}	46–15	2–0
June 6	(3) North Carolina	No. 13 (1)	L. Dale Mitchell Baseball Park • Norman, OK	W 3–2	47–15	3–0

NCAA Charlottesville Super Regional
Date	Opponent	Rank (Seed)	Site/Stadium	Score	Overall Record	SR Record
June 12	No. 3 (5) Virginia	No. 11	Davenport Field • Charlottesville, VA	L 2–3	47–16	0–1
June 13	No. 3 (5) Virginia	No. 11	Davenport Field • Charlottesville, VA	W 10–7	48–16	1–1
June 14	No. 3 (5) Virginia	No. 11	Davenport Field • Charlottesville, VA	W 11–0	49–16	2–1

College World Series
Date	Opponent	Rank (Seed)	Site/Stadium	Score	Overall Record	CWS Record
June 20	No. 5 South Carolina	No. 6	Johnny Rosenblatt Stadium • Omaha, NE	W 4–3	50–16	1–0
June 22	No. 8 Clemson	No. 6	Johnny Rosenblatt Stadium • Omaha, NE	L 4–6	50–17	1–1
June 24	No. 5 South Carolina	No. 6	Johnny Rosenblatt Stadium • Omaha, NE	L 2–3^{12}	50–18	1–2

== Ranking Movements ==
Ranking movements Legend: ██ Increase in ranking ██ Decrease in ranking — = Not ranked
	Week																		
Poll	Pre	1	2	3	4	5	6	7	8	9	10	11	12	13	14	15	16	17	Final
ESPN/USA Today Coaches'	22	22*	22	15	13	12	9	16	14	18	16	17	15	16	15	13	13*	13*	5
Baseball America	—	—	—	25	25	21	17	19	16	24	22	18	17	15	12	11	11*	11*	5
Collegiate Baseball	25	20	17	16	14	13	9	12	11	20	19	17	16	14	13	13	11	6	5
NCBWA	25	22	22	19	16	15	13	17	15	17	15	14	14	15	12	11	11*	6	5

1. = ^ Collegiate Baseball ranked 40 teams in their preseason poll, but only ranked 30 teams weekly during the season.
2. = † NCBWA ranks 35 teams in their preseason poll, but only ranks 30 teams weekly during the season.
3. = * A new poll was not released for this week, so for comparison purposes, the previous week's ranking is inserted in this week's slot.
