= 2010 TCU Horned Frogs baseball team =

American college baseball season

2010 TCU Horned Frogs baseball

Mountain West regular season champion Mountain West tournament champion Fort Worth Regional champion Austin Super Regional champion

College World Series, 3rd (tie)
- Conference: Mountain West Conference
- CB: No. 3
- Record: 54–14 (19–5 MWC)
- Head coach: Jim Schlossnagle (7th season)
- Home stadium: Lupton Stadium

2010 Mountain West Conference baseball standings
	Conf.				Overall
Team	W		L	PCT	W		L	PCT
No. 3 TCU ‍†‍‡‍^{y}	19	–	5	.792	54	–	14	.794
New Mexico ‍‍‍^{y}	14	–	8	.636	38	–	22	.633
San Diego State ‍‍‍	13	–	11	.542	28	–	28	.500
BYU ‍‍‍	12	–	12	.500	27	–	31	.466
UNLV ‍‍‍	11	–	13	.458	29	–	29	.500
Utah ‍‍‍	10	–	13	.435	23	–	28	.451
Air Force ‍‍‍	3	–	20	.130	13	–	42	.236
† – Conference champion ‡ – Tournament champion y – Invited to the 2010 NCAA Division I baseball tournament As of June 30, 2010; Rankings from Collegiate Baseball

The 2010 TCU Horned Frogs baseball team represented Texas Christian University in the 2010 NCAA Division I baseball season. The Horned frogs were coached by Jim Schlossnagle, in his 7th season with the Horned Frogs, and played home games at Lupton Stadium.

== Schedule and results ==
Legend
	TCU win
	TCU loss
	Postponement
**Bold**	TCU team member

2010 TCU Horned Frogs baseball game log
Regular season (43–11)

February (5–1)
Date	Opponent	Rank	Site/stadium	Score	Win	Loss	Save	Att.	Record	MWC	Ref
Feb. 19	Sam Houston State*	No. 11	Lupton Stadium; Fort Worth, Texas	**W** 4–0	**S. Maxwell** (1–0)	D. Gallant (0–1)		3,228	1–0		
Feb. 20	Sam Houston State*	No. 11	Lupton Stadium	**W** 12–7	**M. Purke** (1–0)	P. Spinn (0–1)		3,072	2–0		
Feb. 21	Sam Houston State*	No. 11	Lupton Stadium	**W** 15–2	**K. Winkler** (1–0)	J. Westra (0–1)		2,503	3–0		
Feb. 24	at Baylor*	Game postponed									
Feb. 26	at No. 6 Cal State Fullerton*	No. 9	Goodwin Field; Fullerton, California	**W** 5–2	**S. Maxwell** (2–0)	D. Renken (0–2)	**K. Merck** (1)	2,193	4–0		
Feb. 28	at No. 6 Cal State Fullerton*	No. 9	Goodwin Field	**L** 4–6	D. Hurlbut (1–0)	**P. Gerrish** (0–1)	N. Ramirez (1)	2,028	4–1		
Feb. 28	at No. 6 Cal State Fullerton*	No. 9	Goodwin Field	**W** 8–1	**K. Winkler** (2–0)	T. Pill (1–1)		DH	5–1		

March (13–4)
Date	Opponent	Rank	Site/stadium	Score	Win	Loss	Save	Att.	Record	MWC	Ref
Mar. 2	UTSA*	No. 7	Lupton Stadium	**W** 17–12	**T. Lockwood** (1–0)	R. Perucki (0–1)		2,495	6–1		
Mar. 5	vs. Texas Tech*	No. 7	Minute Maid Park; Houston, Texas	**W** 11–2	**S. Maxwell** (3–0)	C. Bettis (2–1)			7–1		
Mar. 6	vs. Missouri*	No. 7	Minute Maid Park	**W** 4–3 (10)	**K. Merck** (1–0)	J. Emens (0–1)			8–1		
Mar. 7	vs. No. 9 Rice*	No. 7	Minute Maid Park	**L** 4–5	A. Gonzales (2–1)	**E. Miller** (0–1)			8–2		
Mar. 9	at UT Arlington*	No. 7	Clay Gould Ballpark; Arlington, Texas	**W** 15–2	**G. Holle** (1–0)	M. Picca (0–1)		847	9–2		
Mar. 12	Texas Tech*	No. 7	Lupton Stadium	**W** 8–7	**T. Appleby** (1–0)	B. Bruening (2–1)	**K. Merck** (2)	3,257	10–2		
Mar. 13	Texas Tech*	No. 7	Lupton Stadium	**W** 9–1	**M. Purke** (2–0)	B. Doran (0–1)		3,363	11–2		
Mar. 14	Texas Tech*	No. 7	Lupton Stadium	**W** 8–5	**K. Winkler** (3–0)	C. Bettis (2–2)		3,692	12–2		
Mar. 16	at Oral Roberts*	No. 4	J. L. Johnson Stadium; Tulsa, Oklahoma	**W** 6–4	**G. Holle** (2–0)	M. Guest (1–1)	**T. Lockwood** (1)	613	13–2		
Mar. 18	BYU	No. 4	Lupton Stadium	**W** 13–6	**S. Maxwell** (4–0)	J. Shutt (1–3)		2,750	14–2	1–0	
Mar. 19	BYU	No. 4	Lupton Stadium	**W** 11–3	**M. Purke** (3–0)	M. Neil (2–2)		2,948	15–2	2–0	
Mar. 19	BYU	No. 4	Lupton Stadium	**L** 4–5	C. Capper (1–0)	**T. Appleby** (1–1)	D. McKnight (3)	DH	15–3	2–1	
Mar. 22	at Dallas Baptist*	No. 5	Patriot Field; Dallas, Texas	**L** 7–8	B. Williamson (5–0)	**T. Lockwood** (1–1)			15–4		
Mar. 23	Texas State*	No. 5	Lupton Stadium	**W** 4–0	**P. Gerrish** (1–1)	B. Borski (1–4)	**T. Appleby** (1)	2,764	16–4		
Mar. 26	at Air Force	No. 5	Falcon Baseball Field; Colorado Springs, Colorado	**L** 11–14	A. Truesdale (1–4)	**T. Lockwood** (1–2)	E. Abrecht (1)		16–5	2–2	
Mar. 28	at Air Force	No. 5	Falcon Baseball Field	**W** 20–6	**K. Winkler** (4–0)	K. Koehler (1–2)			17–5	3–2	
Mar. 28	at Air Force	Game halted in 7th inning; remainder of game played May 14 (Note: The third game against Air Force began on March 28 at Falcon Baseball Field in Colorado Springs, Colorado; however, it was halted due to TCU's travel restrictions and resumed on May 14. The game was finished immediately prior to the first game of a three-game series hosted by TCU; for this reason, the suspended game was finished at Lupton Stadium in Fort Worth but is still listed as being played in Colorado Springs.)									
Mar. 30	UT Arlington*	No. 11	Lupton Stadium	**W** 10–3	**T. Lockwood** (2–2)	M. Picca (1–2)		2,651	18–5		

April (14–4)
Date	Opponent	Rank	Site/stadium	Score	Win	Loss	Save	Att.	Record	MWC	Ref
Apr. 1	San Diego State	No. 11	Lupton Stadium	**W** 4–1	**T. Appleby** (2–1)	R. Alcala (0–2)		2,648	19–5	4–2	
Apr. 2	San Diego State	No. 11	Lupton Stadium	**W** 11–5	**T. Lockwood** (3–2)	B. Crabb (2–3)		3,056	20–5	5–2	
Apr. 3	San Diego State	No. 11	Lupton Stadium	**L** 1–3	J. Pecoraro (1–1)	**K. Merck** (1–1)		3,071	20–6	5–3	
Apr. 6	No. 12 Oklahoma*	No. 11	Lupton Stadium	**L** 2–3	J. Erben (6–0)	**P. Gerrish** (1–2)	R. Duke (9)	3,924	20–7		
Apr. 9	at Houston*	No. 11	Schroeder Park; Houston, Texas	**W** 15–1	**M. Purke** (4–0)	W. Kankel (1–3)		1,214	21–7		
Apr. 10	at Houston*	No. 11	Schroeder Park	**W** 6–1	**K. Winkler** (5–0)	M. Creel (2–3)	**T. Lockwood** (2)	1,426	22–7		
Apr. 11	at Houston*	No. 11	Schroeder Park	**W** 12–2	**S. Maxwell** (5–0)	M. Goodnight (4–4)		1,243	23–7		
Apr. 13	Texas A&M*	No. 10	Lupton Stadium	**W** 6–1	**T. Lockwood** (4–2)	N. Fleece (1–1)		4,375	24–7		
Apr. 15	at BYU	No. 10	Larry H. Miller Field; Provo, Utah	**W** 14–8	**M. Purke** (5–0)	M. Neil (3–4)		1,103	25–7	6–3	
Apr. 16	at BYU	No. 10	Larry H. Miller Field	**W** 12–1	**K. Winkler** (6–0)	C. Nyberg (0–3)		1,237	26–7	7–3	
Apr. 17	at BYU	No. 10	Larry H. Miller Field	**W** 6–5 (11)	**K. Merck** (2–1)	J. Shutt (3–5)		1,098	27–7	8–3	
Apr. 19	Dallas Baptist*	Game cancelled									
Apr. 20	at Oklahoma*	No. 8	L. Dale Mitchell Baseball Park; Norman, Oklahoma	**L** 3–8	M. Rocha (5–1)	**P. Gerrish** (1–3)		1,181	27–8		
Apr. 23	UNLV	No. 8	Lupton Stadium	**W** 15–5	**M. Purke** (6–0)	T. Peters (4–3)		2,574	28–8	9–3	
Apr. 24	UNLV	No. 8	Lupton Stadium	**W** 9–8	**T. Lockwood** (5–2)	G. DeWeese (1–2)		3,024	29–8	10–3	
Apr. 25	UNLV	No. 8	Lupton Stadium	**W** 7–1	**S. Maxwell** (6–0)	M. Hutchison (4–3)		3,217	30–8	11–3	
Apr. 27	Baylor*	No. 5	Lupton Stadium	**W** 5–4 (10)	**M. Purke** (7–0)	B. Pinckard (1–2)		3,768	31–8		
Apr. 28	at Baylor*	No. 5	Baylor Ballpark; Waco, Texas	**L** 4–14	W. Kempf (5–2)	**G. Holle** (2–1)		2,776	31–9		
Apr. 30	at Utah	No. 5	Lindquist Field; Ogden, Utah	**W** 11–6	**M. Purke** (8–0)	J. Whatcott (4–6)		350	32–9	12–3	

May (11–2)
Date	Opponent	Rank	Site/stadium	Score	Win	Loss	Save	Att.	Record	MWC	Ref
May 1	at Utah	No. 5	Lupton Stadium	**W** 11–4	**K. Winkler** (7–0)	R. Anton (6–3)		135	33–9	13–3	
May 2	at Utah	No. 5	Lupton Stadium	**W** 8–2	**S. Maxwell** (7–0)	B. Card (2–3)		235	34–9	14–3	
May 7	at New Mexico	No. 4	Isotopes Park; Albuquerque, New Mexico	**W** 3–2	**M. Purke** (9–0)	R. Jaramillo (3–2)	**T. Lockwood** (3)	1,950	35–9	15–3	
May 8	at New Mexico	No. 4	Isotopes Park	**L** 2–3	W. Kesler (5–1)	**K. Winkler** (7–1)		3,026	35–10	15–4	
May 9	at New Mexico	No. 4	Isotopes Park	**W** 26–4	**S. Maxwell** (8–0)	K. Toves (4–2)		1,935	36–10	16–4	
May 12	at No. 29 Texas State*	No. 4	Bobcat Ballpark; San Marcos, Texas	**W** 10–5	**T. Appleby** (2–1)	B. Borski (1–8)		1,163	37–10		
May 14	at Air Force	No. 4	Falcon Baseball Field	**W** 19–17 (12)	**M. Purke** (10–0)	E. Abrecht (1–6)		156	38–10	17–4	
May 14	Air Force	No. 4	Lupton Stadium	**W** 8–2	**K. Winkler** (8–1)	A. Truesdale (2–8)		2,685	39–10	18–4	
May 15	Air Force	No. 4	Lupton Stadium	**L** 2–4	K. Koehler (3–8)	**S. Maxwell** (8–1)	S. Carley (1)	2,912	39–11	18–5	
May 16	Air Force	No. 4	Lupton Stadium	**W** 5–3	**T. Lockwood** (6–2)	A. Baker (0–4)	**K. Merck** (3)	3,404	40–11	19–5	
May 18	at UTSA*	Game cancelled									
May 20	Cal State Bakersfield*	No. 6	Lupton Stadium	**W** 13–1	**M. Purke** (11–0)	M. Jannis (4–4)		4,280	41–11		
May 21	Cal State Bakersfield*	No. 6	Lupton Stadium	**W** 12–0	**K. Winkler** (9–1)	B. Van Dam (0–3)		2,872	42–11		
May 22	Cal State Bakersfield*	No. 6	Lupton Stadium	**W** 7–0	**S. Maxwell** (9–1)	M. McCarthy (5–5)		2,711	43–11		

Postseason (11–3)

Mountain West Conference Baseball Tournament (3–0)
Date	Opponent	Rank (Seed)	Site/stadium	Score	Win	Loss	Save	Att.	Record	MWCT	Ref
May 26	vs. (6) Utah	No. 6 (1)	Tony Gwynn Stadium; San Diego, California	**W** 13–2	**M. Purke** (12–0)	J. Whatcott (5–9)		562	44–11	1–0	
May 27	vs. (5) UNLV	No. 6 (1)	Tony Gwynn Stadium	**W** 5–2	**K. Winkler** (10–1)	B. Gilbertson (1–2)		504	45–11	2–0	
May 28	vs. (2) New Mexico	No. 6 (1)	Tony Gwynn Stadium	**W** 2–0	**S. Maxwell** (10–1)	J. Oatman (0–1)	**T. Lockwood** (4)	385	46–11	3–0	

Fort Worth Regional (3–0)
Date	Opponent	Rank (Seed)	Site/stadium	Score	Win	Loss	Save	Att.	Record	NCAAT	Ref
June 4	(4) Lamar*	No. 5 (1)	Lupton Stadium	**W** 16–3	**K. Winkler** (11–1)	M. Smith (10–4)	**G. Holle** (1)	3,135	47–11	1–0	
June 5	(3) Arizona*	No. 5 (1)	Lupton Stadium	**W** 11–5	**M. Purke** (13–0)	K. Simon (8–6)	**T. Lockwood** (5)	3,160	48–11	2–0	
June 6	(2) Baylor*	No. 5 (1)	Lupton Stadium	**W** 9–0	**S. Maxwell** (11–1)	C. Fritsch (5–4)		3,148	49–11	3–0	

Austin Super Regional (2–1)
Date	Opponent	Rank	Site/stadium	Score	Win	Loss	Save	Att.	Record	NCAAT	Ref
June 11	at No. 2 (2) Texas*	No. 5	UFCU Disch–Falk Field; Austin, Texas	**W** 3–1	**M. Purke** (14–0)	C. Green (11–2)	**T. Lockwood** (6)	7,312	50–11	4–0	
June 12	at No. 2 (2) Texas*	No. 5	UFCU Disch–Falk Field	**L** 1–14	T. Jungmann (8–3)	**S. Maxwell** (11–2)		7,315	50–12	4–1	
June 13	at No. 2 (2) Texas*	No. 5	UFCU Disch–Falk Field	**W** 4–1	**K. Winkler** (12–1)	B. Workman (12–2)	**T. Lockwood** (7)	7,356	51–12	5–1	

College World Series (3–2)
Date	Opponent	Rank	Site/stadium	Score	Win	Loss	Save	Att.	Record	CWS	Ref
June 19	vs. No. 7 Florida State*	No. 3	Rosenblatt Stadium; Omaha, Nebraska	**W** 8–1	**M. Purke** (15–0)	S. Gilmartin (9–8)		23,649	52–12	1–0	
June 21	vs. 2 UCLA*	No. 4	Rosenblatt Stadium	**L** 3–6	G. Cole (11–3)	**K. Winkler** (12–2)	D. Klein (10)	23,345	52–13	1–1	
June 23	vs. No. 7 Florida State*	No.	Rosenblatt Stadium	**W** 11–7	**E. Miller** (1–0)	M. McGee (4–1)		22,541	53–13	2–1	
June 25	vs. No. 2 UCLA*	No. 3	Rosenblatt Stadium	**W** 6–2	**M. Purke** (16–0)	R. Rasmussen (11–2)	**T. Lockwood** (8)	22,334	54–13	3–1	
June 26	vs. No. 2 UCLA*	No. 3	Rosenblatt Stadium	**L** 3–10	T. Bauer (12–3)	**K. Winkler** (12–3)		10,907	54–14	3–2	

*Denotes non–conference game • Schedule source
