= 2010 Big 12 Conference baseball tournament =

American college baseball tournament

- Teams: 8
- Format: Two four-team round-robin groups
- Finals site: AT&T Bricktown Ballpark; Oklahoma City, Oklahoma
- Champions: Texas A&M (2nd title)
- Winning coach: Rob Childress (2nd title)
- MVP: Brodie Green (Texas A&M)
- Attendance: 68,275

2010 Big 12 Conference baseball standings
	Conf.						Overall
Team	W		L		T	PCT	W		L		T	PCT
No. 9 Texas ‍†‍‍^{y}	24	–	3	–	0	.889	50	–	13	–	0	.794
No. 5 Oklahoma ‍‍‍^{y}	15	–	10	–	0	.600	50	–	18	–	0	.735
Kansas State ‍‍‍^{y}	14	–	12	–	0	.538	37	–	22	–	0	.627
No. 18 Texas A&M ‍‍‡‍^{y}	14	–	12	–	1	.537	43	–	21	–	1	.669
Texas Tech ‍‍‍	13	–	14	–	0	.481	28	–	29	–	0	.491
Baylor ‍‍‍^{y}	12	–	13	–	0	.480	36	–	24	–	0	.600
Kansas ‍‍‍	11	–	15	–	1	.426	31	–	27	–	1	.534
Missouri ‍‍‍	10	–	16	–	0	.385	29	–	26	–	0	.527
Nebraska ‍‍‍	10	–	17	–	0	.370	27	–	27	–	0	.500
Oklahoma State ‍‍‍	8	–	19	–	0	.296	29	–	26	–	0	.527
† – Conference champion ‡ – Tournament champion y – Invited to the NCAA tournament Rankings from Collegiate Baseball

The 2010 Big 12 Conference baseball tournament is held at AT&T Bricktown Ballpark in Oklahoma City, OK from May 26 to May 30, 2010. This is the fifth year the conference uses the round robin tournament setup. The winners of each group at the end of the round robin face each other in a one-game match for the championship. The Texas A&M Aggies defeated the Baylor Bears 5–3 to win the championship.

== Regular season standings ==
Place	Seed	Team	Conference					Overall			
Place	Seed	Team	W	L	T	%	GB	W	L	T	%
1	1	Texas	24	3	0	.889	–	50	13	0	.794
2	2	Oklahoma	15	10	0	.600	8	50	18	0	.735
3	3	Kansas State	14	12	0	.538	9.5	37	22	0	.627
4	4	Texas A&M	14	12	1	.537	9.5	43	21	1	.669
5	5	Texas Tech	13	14	0	.481	11	28	29	0	.491
6	6	Baylor	12	13	0	.480	11	36	24	0	.600
7	7	Kansas	11	15	1	.426	12.5	31	27	1	.534
8	8	Missouri	10	16	0	.385	13.5	29	26	0	.527
9	–	Nebraska	10	17	0	.370	14	27	27	0	.500
10	–	Oklahoma State	8	19	0	.296	16	29	26	0	.527

- Colorado and Iowa State did not sponsor baseball teams.

== Tournament ==
	Division A	UT	A&M	TTU	MU	Overall
1	Texas		3-9	2-4	2-7	0-3
4	Texas A&M	9-3		9-2	7-2	3-0
5	Texas Tech	4-2	2-9		3-7	1-2
8	Missouri	7-2	2-7	7-3		2-1

	Division B	OU	KSU	BAY	KU	Overall
2	Oklahoma		13-2*	3-8	3-2	2-1
3	Kansas State	2-13*		8-11	10-5	1-2
6	Baylor	8-3	11-8		6-3	3-0
7	Kansas	2-3	5-10	3-6		0-3

Finals
A	Texas A&M	5
B	Baylor	3

- Oklahoma State and Nebraska did not make the tournament.
- Oklahoma vs. Kansas State game ended after 8 innings due to run rule.
- Texas A&M won the pregame coin flip to determine the home team in the championship game.
- Texas A&M won the championship game in 10 innings.

== All-Tournament Team ==
Position	Player	School
C	Daniel Dellasega	Kansas State
1B	Barrett Barnes	Texas Tech
2B	Raynor Campbell	Baylor
3B	Garrett Buechele	Oklahoma
SS	Brodie Greene	Texas A&M
OF	Logan Vick	Baylor
OF	Ryan Gebhardt	Missouri
OF	Connor Rowe	Texas
DH	Matt Juengel	Texas A&M
SP	Willie Kempf	Baylor
SP	Chad Bettis	Texas Tech
RP	John Stilson	Texas A&M
MOP	Brodie Greene	Texas A&M

== See also ==
- College World Series
- 2010 College World Series
- NCAA Division I Baseball Championship
- 2010 NCAA Division I baseball tournament
- Big 12 Conference baseball tournament
