= 2010 Mountain West Conference baseball tournament =

- Teams: 6
- Format: Double-elimination
- Finals site: Tony Gwynn Stadium; San Diego, CA
- Champions: TCU
- MVP: Bryan Holaday (TCU)
- Television: Mountain/CBS Sports Network

2010 Mountain West Conference baseball standings
	Conf.				Overall
Team	W		L	PCT	W		L	PCT
No. 3 TCU ‍†‍‡‍^{y}	19	–	5	.792	54	–	14	.794
New Mexico ‍‍‍^{y}	14	–	8	.636	38	–	22	.633
San Diego State ‍‍‍	13	–	11	.542	28	–	28	.500
BYU ‍‍‍	12	–	12	.500	27	–	31	.466
UNLV ‍‍‍	11	–	13	.458	29	–	29	.500
Utah ‍‍‍	10	–	13	.435	23	–	28	.451
Air Force ‍‍‍	3	–	20	.130	13	–	42	.236
† – Conference champion ‡ – Tournament champion y – Invited to the 2010 NCAA Division I baseball tournament As of June 30, 2010; Rankings from Collegiate Baseball

The 2010 Mountain West Conference baseball tournament took place from May 25 through 29. The top six regular season finishers of the league's seven teams met in the double-elimination tournament held at San Diego State's Tony Gwynn Stadium. Top seeded TCU won their fourth Mountain West Conference Baseball Championship with a championship game score of 2–0 and earned the conference's automatic bid to the 2010 NCAA Division I baseball tournament.

== Seeding ==
The top six finishers from the regular season were seeded one through six based on conference winning percentage only. Only six teams participate, so Air Force was not in the field.

Team	W	L	Pct.	GB	Seed
TCU	21	5	.808	–	1
New Mexico	14	8	.636	5	2
San Diego State	13	11	.542	7	3
BYU	12	12	.500	8	4
UNLV	11	13	.458	9	5
Utah	10	13	.435	9.5	6
Air Force	3	20	.130	16.5	–

== Results ==
Upper round 1	Upper round 2	Upper final	Final
1	TCU	13
4	BYU	1	6	Utah	2
5	UNLV	9	1	TCU	5
5	UNLV	2
2	New Mexico	3
3	San Diego State	6	5	UNLV	3
6	Utah	12
1	TCU	2	–
2	New Mexico	0	–
Lower round 1	Lower round 2	Lower round 3	Lower final
5	UNLV	3
2	New Mexico	7	2	New Mexico	10
6	Utah	18	4	BYU	6
4	BYU	16	4	BYU	25
3	San Diego State	8

== All-Tournament Team ==
Name	Team
Sean McNaughton	BYU
Justin Howard	New Mexico
Ryan Honeycutt	New Mexico
Mike Lachapelle	New Mexico
Taylor Featherton	TCU
Bryan Holaday (MVP)	TCU
Matt Purke	TCU
Kyle Winkler	TCU
Jarred Frierson	UNLV
Tanner Peters	UNLV
C. J. Cron	Utah
Nick Kuroczko	Utah
