= 2010 Texas Longhorns baseball team =

American college baseball season

2010 Texas Longhorns baseball

Big 12 Regular season champions NCAA Austin Regional champions

NCAA Austin Super Regional, 1–2 vs TCU
- Conference: Big 12 Conference

Ranking
- Coaches: No. 9
- CB: No. 9
- Record: 50–13 (24–3 Big 12)
- Head coach: Augie Garrido (14th season)
- Assistant coaches: Tommy Harmon (21st season); Skip Johnson (4th season)
- Home stadium: UFCU Disch–Falk Field

2010 Big 12 Conference baseball standings
	Conf.						Overall
Team	W		L		T	PCT	W		L		T	PCT
No. 9 Texas ‍†‍‍^{y}	24	–	3	–	0	.889	50	–	13	–	0	.794
No. 5 Oklahoma ‍‍‍^{y}	15	–	10	–	0	.600	50	–	18	–	0	.735
Kansas State ‍‍‍^{y}	14	–	12	–	0	.538	37	–	22	–	0	.627
No. 18 Texas A&M ‍‍‡‍^{y}	14	–	12	–	1	.537	43	–	21	–	1	.669
Texas Tech ‍‍‍	13	–	14	–	0	.481	28	–	29	–	0	.491
Baylor ‍‍‍^{y}	12	–	13	–	0	.480	36	–	24	–	0	.600
Kansas ‍‍‍	11	–	15	–	1	.426	31	–	27	–	1	.534
Missouri ‍‍‍	10	–	16	–	0	.385	29	–	26	–	0	.527
Nebraska ‍‍‍	10	–	17	–	0	.370	27	–	27	–	0	.500
Oklahoma State ‍‍‍	8	–	19	–	0	.296	29	–	26	–	0	.527
† – Conference champion ‡ – Tournament champion y – Invited to the NCAA tournament Rankings from Collegiate Baseball

The 2010 Texas Longhorns baseball team represented the Texas Longhorns baseball program for the University of Texas in the 2010 NCAA Division I baseball season. Augie Garrido coached the team in his 14th season at Texas.

Texas finished the regular season with a Big 12 Regular season title, their 6th in the Big 12. They went on to host a Regional at UFCU Disch–Falk Field where they went 3–0, defeating Rider, Louisiana–Lafayette, and Rice and advancing to the Super Regionals. Texas hosted TCU for the Super Regional Round, falling to TCU in 3 games.

Texas outfielder Connor Rowe was named to the 2010 Big 12 Conference baseball tournament All-Tournament Team. P Taylor Jungmann, C Cameron Rupp, SS Brandon Loy, OF Kevin Keyes, and DH Russel Moldenhauer were named to the NCAA Austin Regional All-Tournament Team.

== Personnel ==
=== Roster ===
2010 Texas Longhorns Roster
Pitchers: 12 – Brandon Workman – Junior; 17 – Josh Urban – Freshman; 19 – Sam Stafford – Sophomore; 24 – Cole Green – Junior; 26 – Taylor Jungmann – Sophomore; 27 – Keifer Nuncio – Freshman; 28 – Austin Dicharry – Sophomore; 31 – Chance Ruffin – Junior; 32 – Kendal Carrillo – Junior; 34 – Stayton Thomas – Junior; 40 – Riley Boening – Senior; 41 – Hoby Milner – Freshman; 57 – Andrew McKirahan – Sophomore	Catchers: 3 – Cameron Rupp – Junior; 13 – Nick DeSantiago – Freshman; 42 – Patrick Marsh – Freshman; 46 – Hunter Wilcox – Sophomore; Infielders: 7 – Jordan Etier – Sophomore; 9 – Tant Shepherd – Junior; 11 – Brandon Loy – Sophomore; 14 – Kevin Lusson – Sophomore; 38 – Jordan Weymouth – Freshman; 39 – David Shipman – Freshman; 43 – John Biggs – Freshman; 48 – Chris Ryan – Freshman	Outfielders: 1 – Cohl Walla – Freshman; 6 – Kyle Lusson – Senior; 8 – Tim Maitland – Sophomore; 10 – Connor Rowe – Junior; 15 – Russell Moldenhauer – Senior; 29 – Kevin Keyes – Junior; 33 – Jonathan Walsh – Freshman; 35 – Paul Montalbano – Junior; 45 – Ben Kaplan – Junior

=== Coaches ===
2010 Texas Longhorns Coaching Staff
- Augie Garrido – Head coach – 14th
- Tommy Harmon – Assistant coach – 21st
- Skip Johnson – Assistant coach – 4th
- Travis Tucker – Volunteer assistant coach – 1st

== Schedule ==
2010 Texas Longhorns baseball game log
Legend: = Win = Loss = Canceled Bold = Texas team member
Regular season (46–8)

February (5–2)
Date	Time (CT)	Opponent	Rank	Stadium	Score	Win	Loss	Save	Attendance	Overall record	Big 12 record	Box score	Recap
February 19	3:00 PM	New Mexico*	No. 1	UFCU Disch–Falk Field • Austin, TX	**W** 6–2	**Jungmann** **(1–0)**	Jaramillo (0–1)	—	5,755	1–0	—	Box score	[ Recap]
February 20	2:00 PM	New Mexico*	No. 1	UFCU Disch–Falk Field • Austin, TX	**L** 5–6	Houst (1–0)	**Ruffin** **(0–1)**	—	6,352	1–1	—	Box score	Recap
February 21	1:00 PM	New Mexico*	No. 1	UFCU Disch–Falk Field • Austin, TX	**L** 1–3	Lachapelle (1–0)	**Dicharry** **(0–1)**	Sanchez (1)	5,953	1–2	—	Box score	Recap
February 24	3:00 PM	Dallas Baptist*	No. 4	UFCU Disch–Falk Field • Austin, TX	**W** 7–2	**Green** **(1–0)**	Haney (0–1)	—	4,950	2–2	—	Box score	Recap
February 26	3:00 PM	No. 18 Stanford*	No. 4	UFCU Disch–Falk Field • Austin, TX	**W** 6–0	**Jungmann** **(2–0)**	Pries (1–1)	—	5,810	3–2	—	Box score	[ Recap]
February 27	2:00 PM	No. 18 Stanford*	No. 4	UFCU Disch–Falk Field • Austin, TX	**W** 6–3	**Workman** **(1–0)**	Snodgress (0–1)	**Ruffin** **(1)**	7,151	4–2	—	Box score	Recap
February 28	1:00 PM	No. 18 Stanford*	No. 4	UFCU Disch–Falk Field • Austin, TX	**W** 8–2	**Green** **(2–0)**	Mooneyham (0–1)	—	6,677	5–2	—	Box score	[ Recap]

March (13–5)
Date	Time (CT)	Opponent	Rank	Stadium	Score	Win	Loss	Save	Attendance	Overall record	Big 12 record	Box score	Recap
March 2	6:00 PM	UT Pan American*	No. 4	UFCU Disch–Falk Field • Austin, TX	**W** 3–2	**Thomas** **(1–0)**	Kotchie (0–1)	**Ruffin** **(2)**	5,131	6–2	—	Box score	Recap
March 5	7:00 PM	vs. Rice* (Houston College Classic)	No. 4	Minute Maid Park • Houston, TX	**W** 2–1	**Ruffin** **(1–1)**	Wall (0–2)	—	10,706	7–2	—	Box score	Recap
March 6	3:30 PM	vs. Houston* (Houston College Classic)	No. 4	Minute Maid Park • Houston, TX	**L** 0–1	Goodnight (2–0)	**Workman** **(1–1)**	Creel (2)		7–3	—	Box score	Recap
March 7	11:00 AM	vs. Missouri* (Houston College Classic)	No. 4	Minute Maid Park • Houston, TX	**W** 8–5	**Green** **(3–0)**	Hardoin (1–1)	**Ruffin** **(3)**		8–3	—	Box score	Recap
March 9	6:00 PM	Texas State*	No. 6	UFCU Disch–Falk Field • Austin, TX	**W** 4–3	**McKirahan** **(1–0)**	Carruth (1–1)	**Ruffin** **(4)**	6,049	9–3	—	Box score	Recap
March 12	6:00 PM	Iowa*	No. 6	UFCU Disch–Falk Field • Austin, TX	**W** 2–1 ^{10}	**Ruffin** **(2–1)**	Brown (0–1)	—	6,029	10–3	—	Box score	Recap
March 13	12:30 PM	Iowa*	No. 6	UFCU Disch–Falk Field • Austin, TX	**W** 3–1 ^{7}	**Green** **(4–0)**	Schreiber (1–1)	—		11–3	—	Box score	Recap
March 13	3:30 PM	Iowa*	No. 6	UFCU Disch–Falk Field • Austin, TX	**W** 5–2	**Workman** **(2–1)**	Jenyon (0–1)	**Ruffin** **(5)**	7,472	12–3	—	Box score	Recap
March 14	1:00 PM	Iowa*	No. 6	UFCU Disch–Falk Field • Austin, TX	**W** 18–0	**Thomas** **(2–0)**	Robertson (2–2)	—	6,989	13–3	—	Box score	Recap
March 16	6:30 PM	at Rice*	No. 6	Reckling Park • Houston, TX	**L** 6–10	McNair (1–0)	**Dicharry** **(0–2)**	—	5,469	13–4	—	Box score	Recap
March 19	6:00 PM	Nebraska	No. 6	UFCU Disch–Falk Field • Austin, TX	**W** 6–5	**Ruffin** **(3–1)**	Giller (0–1)	—	7,240	14–4	1–0	Box score	Recap
March 20	3:00 PM	Nebraska	No. 6	UFCU Disch–Falk Field • Austin, TX	**L** 3–5	Mariot (2–1)	**McKirahan** **(1–1)**	Adams (1)	6,051	14–5	1–1	Box score	Recap
March 21	12:00 PM	Nebraska	No. 6	UFCU Disch–Falk Field • Austin, TX	**W** 13–3 ^{8}	**Workman** **(3–1)**	Lemke (3–1)	—	5,759	15–5	2–1	Box score	Recap
March 23	6:00 PM	Rice*	No. 10	UFCU Disch–Falk Field • Austin, TX	**W** 5–1	**Ruffin** **(4–1)**	Gonzales (2–3)	—	7,003	16–5	—	Box score	Recap
March 26	6:30 PM	at Texas Tech	No. 10	Dan Law Field • Lubbock, TX	**L** 5–12	Neely (2–0)	**Jungmann** **(2–1)**	—	3,824	16–6	2–2	Box score	Recap
March 27	6:30 PM	at Texas Tech	No. 10	Dan Law Field • Lubbock, TX	**W** 8–3	**Green** **(5–0)**	Doran (0–2)	**Ruffin** **(6)**	4,010	17–6	3–2	Box score	Recap
March 28	12:00 PM	at Texas Tech	No. 10	Dan Law Field • Lubbock, TX	**W** 17–5	**Workman** **(4–1)**	Bettis (3–3)	—	3,650	18–6	4–2	Box score	Recap
March 30	6:00 PM	Oral Roberts*	No. 7	UFCU Disch–Falk Field • Austin, TX	**L** 2–3	Burleson (3–2)	**Dicharry** **(0–3)**	—	6,280	18–7	—	Box score	Recap

April (18–0)
Date	Time (CT)	Opponent	Rank	Stadium	Score	Win	Loss	Save	Attendance	Overall record	Big 12 record	Box score	Recap
April 1	6:30 PM	at No. 9 Oklahoma	No. 7	L. Dale Mitchell Baseball Park • Norman, OK	**W** 5–0	**Jungmann** **(3–1)**	Neal (3–1)	—	2,294	19–7	5–2	Box score	Recap
April 2	6:30 PM	at No. 9 Oklahoma	No. 7	L. Dale Mitchell Baseball Park • Norman, OK	**W** 2–0	**Green** **(6–0)**	Shore (4–1)	**Ruffin** **(7)**	2,069	20–7	6–2	Box score	Recap
April 3	2:00 PM	at No. 9 Oklahoma	No. 7	L. Dale Mitchell Baseball Park • Norman, OK	**W** 9–3	**Workman** **(5–1)**	Robinson (4–2)	—	2,260	21–7	7–2	Box score	[ Recap]
April 6	6:00 PM	Texas A&M-Corpus Christi*	No. 6	UFCU Disch–Falk Field • Austin, TX	**W** 16–3	**Carrillo** **(1–0)**	Madrid (0–2)	—	5,644	22–7	—	Box score	Recap
April 7	6:00 PM	Texas A&M-Corpus Christi*	No. 6	UFCU Disch–Falk Field • Austin, TX	**W** 6–2	**Carrillo** **(2–0)**	Pena (0–2)	—	5,231	23–7	—	Box score	Recap
April 9	6:00 PM	Kansas	No. 6	UFCU Disch–Falk Field • Austin, TX	**W** 3–2 ^{11}	**Milner** **(1–0)**	Murray (0–1)	—	6,446	24–7	8–2	Box score	Recap
April 10	2:00 PM	Kansas	No. 6	UFCU Disch–Falk Field • Austin, TX	**W** 3–1	**Green** **(7–0)**	Selik (4–3)	**Ruffin** **(8)**	7,401	25–7	9–2	Box score	Recap
April 11	1:00 PM	Kansas	No. 6	UFCU Disch–Falk Field • Austin, TX	**W** 10–4	**Workman** **(6–1)**	Bollman (1–3)	—	6,415	26–7	10–2	Box score	Recap
April 13	6:00 PM	Texas State*	No. 3	UFCU Disch–Falk Field • Austin, TX	**W** 6–5	**Nuncio** **(1–0)**	Carruth (2–2)	**Ruffin** **(9)**	5,648	27–7	—	Box score	Recap
April 16	6:00 PM	Texas A&M	No. 3	UFCU Disch–Falk Field • Austin, TX	**W** 4–3 ^{11}	**THomas** **(3–0)**	Minks (1–1)	—	7,876	28–7	11–2	Box score	Recap
April 17	5:30 PM	at Texas A&M	No. 3	Olsen Field • College Station, TX	**W** 14–0	**Green** **(8–0)**	Wacha (3–2)	—	8,123	29–7	12–2	Box score	Recap
April 18	1:00 PM	at Texas A&M	No. 3	Olsen Field • College Station, TX	**W** 8–0	**Workman** **(7–1)**	Stripling (3–3)	—	7,025	30–7	13–2	Box score	Recap
April 20	6:05 PM	UT Arlington*	No. 2	UFCU Disch–Falk Field • Austin, TX	**W** 21–2	**McKirahan** **(2–1)**	Picca (1–4)	—	5,392	31–7	—	Box score	Recap
April 23	6:05 PM	Oklahoma State	No. 2	UFCU Disch–Falk Field • Austin, TX	**W** 14–1	**Jungmann** **(4–1)**	Keeling (3–5)	—	6,193	32–7	14–2	Box score	Recap
April 24	2:00 PM	Oklahoma State	No. 2	UFCU Disch–Falk Field • Austin, TX	**W** 5–0	**Green** **(9–0)**	Lyons (3–3)	—	7,314	33–7	15–2	Box score	Recap
April 25	1:00 PM	Oklahoma State	No. 2	UFCU Disch–Falk Field • Austin, TX	**W** 9–3	**Workman** **(8–1)**	Heaney (3–1)	—	7,138	34–7	16–2	Box score	Recap
April 27	6:00 PM	UTSA*	No. 1	UFCU Disch–Falk Field • Austin, TX	**W** 6–4	**Nuncio** **(2–0)**	Towler (1–5)	**Ruffin** **(10)**	5,669	35–7	—	Box score	Recap
April 30	6:30 PM	at Baylor	No. 1	Baylor Ballpark • Waco, TX	**W** 4–2 ^{10}	**Ruffin** **(5–1)**	Browder (4–2)	—	4,409	36–7	17–2	Box score	Recap

May (10–1)
Date	Time (CT)	Opponent	Rank	Stadium	Score	Win	Loss	Save	Attendance	Overall record	Big 12 record	Box score	Recap
May 1	8:00 PM	Baylor	No. 1	UFCU Disch–Falk Field • Austin, TX	**W** 2–1 ^{14}	**Milner** **(2–0)**	Pinckard (1–3)	—	7,903	37–7	18–2	Box score	Recap
May 2	2:30 PM	Baylor	No. 1	UFCU Disch–Falk Field • Austin, TX	**W** 4–1	**Workman** **(9–1)**	Fritsch (0–3)	**Thomas** **(1)**	7,608	38–7	19–2	Box score	Recap
May 4	6:00 PM	Prairie View A&M*	No. 1	UFCU Disch–Falk Field • Austin, TX	**W** 6–0	**Carrillo** **(3–0)**	Blackburn (3–8)	—	6,178	39–7	—	Box score	Recap
May 7	6:30 PM	at No. 27 Kansas State	No. 1	Tointon Family Stadium • Manhattan, KS	**L** 1–2	Hunter (8–0)	**Jungmann** **(4–2)**	Allen (6)	2,630	39–8	19–3	Box score	Recap
May 8	2:30 PM	at No. 27 Kansas State	No. 1	Tointon Family Stadium • Manhattan, KS	**W** 17–2	**Green** **(10–0)**	Bahramzadeh (1–3)	—	3,189	40–8	20–3	Box score	Recap
May 9	1:00 PM	at No. 27 Kansas State	No. 1	Tointon Family Stadium • Manhattan, KS	**W** 6–5	**Milner** **(3–0)**	Marshall (4–3)	**Ruffin** **(11)**	1,548	41–8	21–3	Box score	Recap
May 16	12:30 PM	Louisiana Tech*	No. 1	UFCU Disch–Falk Field • Austin, TX	**W** 10–9	**Workman** **(10–1)**	Dudley (2–3)	**Ruffin** **(12)**		42–8	—	Box score	[ Recap]
May 16	3:00 PM	Louisiana Tech*	No. 1	UFCU Disch–Falk Field • Austin, TX	**W** 13–2	**Jungmann** **(5–2)**	Petersen (5–7)	—	8,197	43–8	—	Box score	Recap
May 21	6:00 PM	at Missouri	No. 1	Taylor Stadium • Columbia, MO	**W** 5–2	**Jungmann** **(6–2)**	Tepesch (5–6)	**Ruffin** **(13)**	1,092	44–8	22–3	Box score	Recap
May 22	2:00 PM	at Missouri	No. 1	Taylor Stadium • Columbia, MO	**W** 6–4	**Ruffin** **(6–1)**	Clark (2–2)	—	1,680	45–8	23–3	Box score	Recap
May 23	12:00 PM	at Missouri	No. 1	Taylor Stadium • Columbia, MO	**W** 20–11	**Workman** **(11–1)**	Emens (3–5)	—	928	46–8	24–3	Box score	Recap

Postseason (4–5)

Big 12 tournament (0–3)
Date	Time (CT)	Opponent	Seed	Stadium	Score	Win	Loss	Save	Attendance	Overall record	Tournament record	Box score	Recap
May 26	12:30 PM	vs. (8) Missouri	1	AT&T Bricktown Ballpark • Oklahoma City, OK	**L** 3–7	Tepesch (6–6)	**Milner** **(3–1)**	—	4,373	46–9	0–1	Box score	
May 27	3:00 PM	vs. (5) Texas Tech	1	AT&T Bricktown Ballpark • Oklahoma City, OK	**L** 2–4	Bettis (7–4)	**Jungmann** **(6–3)**	Doran (1)	4,493	46–10	0–2	Box score	Recap
May 29	12:30 PM	vs. (4) Texas A&M	1	AT&T Bricktown Ballpark • Oklahoma City, OK	**L** 3–9	Ehlert (4–6)	**Green** **(10–1)**	—	5,442	46–11	0–3	Box score	Recap

Austin Regional (3–0)
Date	Time (CT)	Opponent	Seed	Stadium	Score	Win	Loss	Save	Attendance	Overall record	Regional Record	Box score	Recap
June 4	6:30 PM	(4) Rider	1	UFCU Disch–Falk Field • Austin, TX	**W** 11–0	**Workman** **(12–1)**	Thomas (6–3)	—		47–11	1–0		Recap
June 5	6:30 PM	(3) Louisiana–Lafayette	1	UFCU Disch–Falk Field • Austin, TX	**W** 4–2	**Green** **(11–1)**	Geith (6–2)	**Ruffin** **(14)**	7,140	48–11	2–0	Box score	Recap
June 6	6:30 PM	(2) Rice	1	UFCU Disch–Falk Field • Austin, TX	**W** 4–1	**Jungmann** **(7–3)**	Anagnostou (3–5)	—	7,131	49–11	3–0	Box score	Recap

Austin Super Regional (1–2)
Date	Time (CT)	Opponent	National seed	Stadium	Score	Win	Loss	Save	Attendance	Overall record	Super regional record	Box score	Recap
June 11	2:00 PM	TCU	2	UFCU Disch–Falk Field • Austin, TX	**L** 1–3	Purke (14–0)	**Green** **(11–2)**	Lockwood (6)	7,312	49–12	0–1	Box score	Recap
June 12	12:00 PM	TCU	2	UFCU Disch–Falk Field • Austin, TX	**W** 14–1	**Jungmann** **(8–3)**	Maxwell (11–2)	—	7,315	50–12	1–1	Box score	Recap
June 13	3:00 PM	TCU	2	UFCU Disch–Falk Field • Austin, TX	**L** 1–4	Winkler (12–1)	**Workman** **(12–2)**	Lockwood (7)	7,356	50–13	1–2	Box score	Recap

* indicates a non-conference game. All rankings from Collegiate Baseball on the date of the contest.

== Postseason ==
=== Big 12 tournament ===
	Division A	UT	A&M	TTU	MU	Overall
1	Texas		3-9	2-4	2-7	0-3
4	Texas A&M	9-3		9-2	7-2	3-0
5	Texas Tech	4-2	2-9		3-7	1-2
8	Missouri	7-2	2-7	7-3		2-1

	Division B	OU	KSU	BAY	KU	Overall
2	Oklahoma		13-2*	3-8	3-2	2-1
3	Kansas State	2-13*		8-11	10-5	1-2
6	Baylor	8-3	11-8		6-3	3-0
7	Kansas	2-3	5-10	3-6		0-3

Finals
A	Texas A&M	5
B	Baylor	3

- Oklahoma State and Nebraska did not make the tournament.
- Oklahoma vs. Kansas State game ended after 8 innings due to run rule.
- Texas A&M won the pregame coin flip to determine the home team in the championship game.
- Texas A&M won the championship game in 10 innings.

=== NCAA tournament ===
Regional	Regional
1	Texas	11
4	Rider	0
1	Texas	4
3	Louisiana–Lafayette	2
3	Louisiana–Lafayette	1
2	Rice	0
Austin Regional – UFCU Disch–Falk Field
4	Rider	1
2	Rice	19
2	Rice	9
3	Louisiana–Lafayette	1
1	TCU	16
4	Lamar	3
1	TCU	11
3	Arizona	5
3	Arizona	10
2	Baylor	9
Fort Worth Regional – Lupton Stadium
4	Lamar	4
2	Baylor	6
2	Baylor	4
3	Arizona	2

Regional finals
1	Texas	4	—
2	Rice	1	—
1	TCU	9	—
2	Baylor	0	—

Super regionals
2	Texas	1	14	1
TCU	3	1	4

== Rankings ==
Ranking movements Legend: ██ Increase in ranking ██ Decrease in ranking
	Week																		
Poll	Pre	1	2	3	4	5	6	7	8	9	10	11	12	13	14	15	16	17	Final
Coaches'	1	1*	5	6	6	8	7	6	4	2	1	1	1	1	1	3	3*	3*	9
Baseball America	1	3	3	3	2	8	7	6	4	3	2	2	2	2	2	3	3*	3*	9
Collegiate Baseball^	1	4	4	6	6	10	7	6	3	2	1	1	1	1	1	5	2	9	9
NCBWA†	1	8	6	6	5	9	7	6	3	2	1	1	1	1	1	4	4*	4*	9

^ Collegiate Baseball ranked 40 teams in their preseason poll, but only ranked 30 teams weekly during the season.
† NCBWA ranks 30 teams in their preseason poll, but only ranks 25 teams weekly during the season.
* A new poll was not released for this week, so for comparison purposes, the previous week's ranking is inserted in this week's slot.
