= 2010 Kansas State Wildcats baseball team =

American college baseball season

2010 Kansas State Wildcats baseball

2010 NCAA tournament Participant
- Conference: Big 12 Conference
- Record: 37–22 (14–12 Big 12)
- Head coach: Brad Hill
- Hitting coach: Andy Sawyers
- Pitching coach: Sean McCann
- Home stadium: Tointon Family Stadium

2010 Big 12 Conference baseball standings
	Conf.						Overall
Team	W		L		T	PCT	W		L		T	PCT
No. 9 Texas ‍†‍‍^{y}	24	–	3	–	0	.889	50	–	13	–	0	.794
No. 5 Oklahoma ‍‍‍^{y}	15	–	10	–	0	.600	50	–	18	–	0	.735
Kansas State ‍‍‍^{y}	14	–	12	–	0	.538	37	–	22	–	0	.627
No. 18 Texas A&M ‍‍‡‍^{y}	14	–	12	–	1	.537	43	–	21	–	1	.669
Texas Tech ‍‍‍	13	–	14	–	0	.481	28	–	29	–	0	.491
Baylor ‍‍‍^{y}	12	–	13	–	0	.480	36	–	24	–	0	.600
Kansas ‍‍‍	11	–	15	–	1	.426	31	–	27	–	1	.534
Missouri ‍‍‍	10	–	16	–	0	.385	29	–	26	–	0	.527
Nebraska ‍‍‍	10	–	17	–	0	.370	27	–	27	–	0	.500
Oklahoma State ‍‍‍	8	–	19	–	0	.296	29	–	26	–	0	.527
† – Conference champion ‡ – Tournament champion y – Invited to the NCAA tournament Rankings from Collegiate Baseball

The 2010 Kansas State Wildcats baseball team represented Kansas State University in the NCAA Division I college baseball season of 2010. It was the 110th baseball season in school history.

The team's head coach was Brad Hill who was in his seventh season at Kansas State. He was previously the head coach at Central Missouri State before coming to Manhattan in 2004.

== Roster ==
Pitchers: James Allen; Matt Applegate; Kayvon Bahramzdeh; Ryan Daniel; Jake Doller; Ryan Downs; Gerardo Esquivel; Brandon Faulkner; Tyler Giannatti; Robert Hawkins (L); Ben Heairet (L); Kyle Hunter (L); Dale Kube; Justin Lindsey; Evan Marshall; Keith Picht; Tyler Sturges; Thomas Rooke (L)	Catchers: Blair DeBord; Daniel Dellasega; Chase Graskewicz	Infielders: David Allday; Jake Brown; Trey Buck; Brad Clement; Matt Giller; Randon Henika; Carter Jurica; Mike Kindel; Jason King; Adam Muenster; Tanner Witt	Outfielders: Nick Cocking; Nick Martini; Ryan Moore; Kent Urban

== Coaches ==
Name	Title	First Season at K-State	Alma Mater
Brad Hill	Head Coach	2004	Emporia State (1985)
Andy Sawyers	Hitting Coach	2009	Nebraska (1998)
Sean McCann	Pitching Coach	2004	St. Francis (1993)

== Schedule/results ==
2010 Kansas State Wildcats baseball schedule
Regular season

#	Date	Opponent	Score	Site/stadium	Win	Loss	Save	Attendance	Overall record	Big 12 record
1	February 19	vs Delaware	11–5	Riley Park	Daniel	Young	Allen	240	1–0	0–0
2	February 20	vs East Tennessee State	6–10	Riley Park	McNally	Doller		208	1–1	0–0
3	February 21	at The Citadel	2–1	Riley Park	Hunter	Clevinger	Allen	601	2–1	0–0
4	February 27	vs Duquesne	10–3	Chain of Lakes Park	Daniel	Heck		102	3–1	0–0
5	February 28	vs Northeastern	6–1	Chain of Lakes Park	Marshall	Ross		233	4–1	0–0
6	March 1	vs St. Bonaventure	14–7 (11)	Chain of Lakes Park	Allen	Steinbach		179	5–1	0–0
7	March 2	vs Western Michigan	27–8	Chain of Lakes Park	Lindsey	Kneibel		181	6–1	0–0
8	March 3	vs Villanova	5–8	Chain of Lakes Park	Crimmel	Bahramzadeh	McMyne	232	6–2	0–0
9	March 5	at Stetson	14–6	Conrad Park	Daniel	Caughel		729	7–2	0–0
10	March 6	vs Notre Dame	5–2	Conrad Park	Marshall	Sabatino	Allen	279	8–2	0–0
11	March 7	vs Harvard	6–1	Conrad Park	Hunter	Eadington		119	9–2	0–0
12	March 12	Kent State	11–8	Tointon Family Stadium	Daniel	Mace		577	10–2	0–0
13	March 13	Kent State	10–9 (10)	Tointon Family Stadium	Allen	Weibley			11–2	0–0
14	March 13	Kent State	7–1	Tointon Family Stadium	Hunter	Sabo		809	12–2	0–0
15	March 14	Kent State	11–0 (7)	Tointon Family Stadium	Lindsey	Hallock		693	13–2	0–0
16	March 16	Creighton	4–7	Tointon Family Stadium	Winkelman	Rooke		1,090	13–3	0–0
17	March 19	UW–Milwaukee	4–0	Tointon Family Stadium	Daniel	Schmidt			14–3	0–0
18	March 19	UW–Milwaukee	2–1	Tointon Family Stadium	Rooke	Amsrud		589	15–3	0–0
19	March 23	Newman	7–1	Tointon Family Stadium	Hunter	Trevino		864	16–3	0–0
20	March 26	Oklahoma State	14–11	Tointon Family Stadium	Allen	Peck		1,539	17–3	1–0
21	March 28	Oklahoma State	9–3	Tointon Family Stadium	Rooke	Keeling			18–3	2–0
22	March 28	Oklahoma State	13–3 (7)	Tointon Family Stadium	Hunter	Chambers		1,374	19–3	3–0
23	March 30	#30 Wichita State	8–3	Tointon Family Stadium	Applegate	Muncrief		4,745	20–3	3–0
24	April 1	at Texas Tech	5–8	Dan Law Field	Johnson	Marshall		1,897	20–4	3–1
25	April 2	at Texas Tech	4–13	Dan Law Field	Doran	Daniel	Bettis	2,505	20–5	3–2
26	April 3	at Texas Tech	10–6	Dan Law Field	Allen	Bruening		2,846	21–5	4–2
27	April 9	Nebraska	3–5	Tointon Family Stadium	Mariot	Lindsey	Hauptman	3,486	21–6	4–3
28	April 10	Nebraska	13–5	Tointon Family Stadium	Hunter	Tate		2,943	22–6	5–3
29	April 11	Nebraska	8–3	Tointon Family Stadium	Marshall	Lemke		2,111	23–6	6–3
30	April 13	at BYU	9–15	Larry H. Miller Field	Shutt	Bahramzadeh		421	23–7	6–3
31	April 14	at BYU	10–13	Larry H. Miller Field	Howard	Lindsey		717	23–8	6–3
32	April 16	Baylor	5–2	Tointon Family Stadium	Rooke	Tolleson	Allen	2,248	24–8	7–3
33	April 17	Baylor	5–2	Tointon Family Stadium	Hunter	Verrett	Allen	2,054	25–8	8–3
34	April 18	Baylor	3–2	Tointon Family Stadium	Lindsey	Kempf	Marshall	2,204	26–8	9–3
35	April 20	at Wichita State	7–4	Eck Stadium	Giannonatti	McGreevy		7,217	27–8	9–3
36	April 25	at Missouri	2–4	Taylor Stadium	Tepesh	Daniel	Emens	214	27–8	9–4
37	April 25	at Missouri	8–9 (10)	Taylor Stadium	Fick	Marshall		214	27–9	9–5
38	April 27	Chicago State	12–4	Tointon Family Stadium	Bahramzadeh	Day		1,916	28–9	9–5
39	April 28	Chicago State	20–2 (7)	Tointon Family Stadium	Lindsey	Faron		717	29–9	9–5
40	April 30	at Oklahoma	3–14	L. Dale Mitchell Baseball Park	Neal	Daniel		1,026	29–10	9–6
41	May 1	at #15 Oklahoma	14–9	L. Dale Mitchell Baseball Park	Marshall	Shore		1,139	30–10	10–6
42	May 2	at #15 Oklahoma	11–15	L. Dale Mitchell Baseball Park	Mayfield	Lindsey		1,010	30–11	10–7
43	May 4	Minnesota	12–6	Tointon Family Stadium	Giannonatti	Bechstein		1,526	31–11	10–7
44	May 5	Minnesota	0–3	Tointon Family Stadium	Lubinsky	Applegate		941	31–12	10–7
45	May 7	#1 Texas	2–1	Tointon Family Stadium	Hunter	Jungmann	Allen	2,630	32–12	11–7
46	May 8	#1 Texas	2–17	Tointon Family Stadium	Green	Bahramzadeh		3,189	32–13	11–8
47	May 9	#1 Texas	5–6	Tointon Family Stadium	Milner	Marshall	Ruffin	1,548	32–14	11–9
48	May 14	at Kansas	5–4	Hoglund Ballpark	Rooke	Walz	Allen	1,663	33–15	12–9
49	May 15	Kansas	3–7	Tointon Family Stadium	Selik	Hunter		2,296	33–16	12–10
50	May 16	Kansas	8–5	Tointon Family Stadium	Marshall	Blankenship		1,429	34–16	13–10
51	May 21	at Texas A&M	8–7 (10)	Olsen Field	Allen	Fleece		3,281	35–16	14–10
52	May 22	at Texas A&M	2–10	Olsen Field	Stripling	Hunter		3,764	35–17	14–11
53	May 23	at Texas A&M	2–3	Olsen Field	Uriegas	Marshall	Stilson	3,119	35–18	14–12

Big 12 Tournament

#	Date	Opponent	Score	Site/stadium	Win	Loss	Save	Attendance	Overall record	Big 12 T record
1	May 26	Baylor	8–11	Bricktown Ballpark	Kempf	Marshall		5,003	35–19	0–1
2	May 28	Kansas	10–5	Bricktown Ballpark	Hunter	Selik	Allen	5,855	36–19	1–1
3	May 29	Oklahoma	2–13 (8)	Bricktown Ballpark	Shore	Daniel		5,817	36–20	1–2

NCAA tournament: Regionals

#	Date	Opponent	Score	Site/stadium	Win	Loss	Save	Attendance	Overall record	NCAAT record
1	June 4	# 23 Washington State	6–8	Baum Stadium	Lambert	Allen	Conley	2,518	36–21	0–1
2	June 5	Grambling	9–8	Baum Stadium	Bahramzadeh	Turner	Allen	5,375	37–21	1–1
3	June 6	# 23 Washington State	9–6	Baum Stadium	Ochoa	Lindsey	Harvey	5,061	37–22	1–2

== Awards and honors ==
Sophomore outfielder Nick Martini was named the league's co-Player of the Year, the first time a Wildcat had received the honor since Craig Wilson in 1992. It was K-State's third specialty award in the past two years after A.J. Morris was named Pitcher of the Year and Brad Hill as Coach of the Year in 2009. Martini shared the Player of the Year award with Missouri's Aaron Seene.

Martini was one of three Wildcats to earn first-team All-Big 12 honors as he was joined on the squad by senior third baseman Adam Muenster and junior shortstop Carter Jurica. It was the most first-team members for Kansas State since the Wildcats placed three on the All-Big Eight team in 1995

Sophomore pitcher Evan Marshall was named to the second team. He has been stellar for the Wildcats since making a switch from starter to reliever midway through the season. Marshall is 5–3 with a 3.76 ERA this season, but holds a 1.82 ERA in 17 relief appearances since moving to the bullpen. In 34 2/3 innings as a relief pitcher, Marshall is limiting opponents to a .165 batting average, including a .162 mark in Big 12 play.

Senior catcher Daniel Dellasega and sophomore pitcher Kyle Hunter were named honorable mention All-Big 12. Coupled with the seven All-Big 12 honorees last season, the 13 Wildcats to earn All-Big 12 honors over the last two seasons are the most in a two-year span since 2001–02.

== Wildcats in the 2010 MLB draft ==
The following members of the 2010 Kansas State Wildcats baseball team were drafted in the 2010 MLB draft.

Player	Position	Round	Overall	MLB team
Carter Jurica	Short Stop	3rd	105	San Francisco Giants
Mason Justice*	Pitcher	21st	653	Boston Red Sox
Adam Muenster	Third Base	29th	907	Cincinnati Reds
Johnny Fasola*	Pitcher	36th	1,102	Los Angeles Dodgers
Levi Schlick*	Pitcher	39th	1,178	Chicago White Sox
Kyle Hunter	Pitcher	43rd	1,315	New York Yankees
Blake Freeman*	Pitcher	45th	1,361	Tampa Bay Rays

*2010 Signee

== See also ==
- Kansas State University
- Kansas State Wildcats
- Kansas State Wildcats baseball
- Tointon Family Stadium
- Brad Hill
