= Sunny Golloway =

American baseball coach

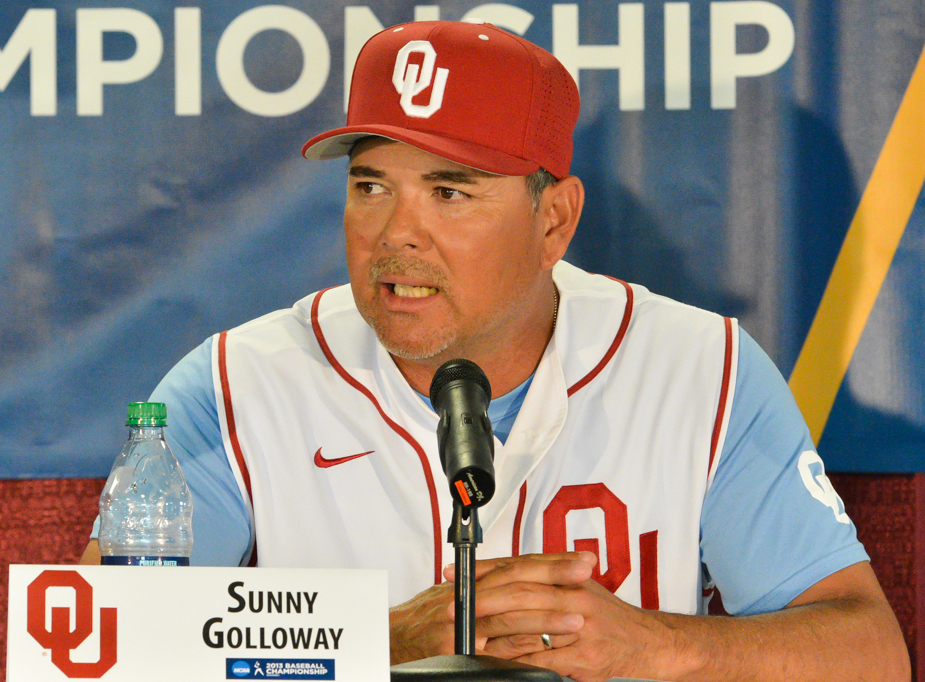
- Golloway with Oklahoma in 2013

Current position
- Title: Head Coach
- Team: Northeastern State University
- Conference: Mid-America Intercollegiate Athletics Association
- Record: 20-30

Biographical details
- Born: Springfield, Missouri, U.S.

Coaching career (HC unless noted)
- 1992–1995: Oklahoma (Asst.)
- 1996–2003: Oral Roberts
- 2004–2005: Oklahoma (Asst.)
- 2005–2013: Oklahoma
- 2014–2015: Auburn
- 2020–2022: Moore High School (OK)
- 2023: East Central
- 2024–present: Northeastern State University

Head coaching record
- Overall: 743–387–1

Accomplishments and honors

Championships
- Mid-Continent Conference (1998–2003); Big 12 Conference tournament (2013)

Records
- 4x MCC Coach of the Year (1998, 1999, 2000, 2002)

Sunny Golloway is the head baseball coach at NCAA Division II Northeastern State University in Tahlequah, Oklahoma. His most recent stint as head baseball coach of an NCAA Division I institution was at Auburn. He was fired September 27, 2015. He succeeded coach John Pawlowski. Golloway was hired by Auburn University on June 14, 2013. Prior to becoming the head coach of Auburn, he was the head coach at Oklahoma.

== Coaching career ==
=== Oral Roberts ===
Golloway took over the Oral Roberts University baseball program in 1996 and saw their transition from a Division I Independent to a member of the Mid-Continent Conference in 1998. During his time with the university, the baseball team participated in NCAA Regionals from 1998 to 2003. Also during that same stretch, the Golden Eagles won the Mid-Continent Conference regular season and tournament championships. Golloway was also voted by his coaching peers as the Conference Coach of the Year in 1998, 1999, 2000, and 2002. He compiled a 335–156 (.682) total record while with Oral Roberts and averaged 42 wins per season.

=== Oklahoma ===
Golloway returned to the University of Oklahoma in 2004 as an assistant, but he was named interim head coach for the Sooners during the 2005 season and eventually was named permanent head coach. Golloway and the Sooners made it to the NCAA tournament in all but one of his nine seasons, with 2007 being the exception. The Sooners also made it to the Super Regional round of play in 2006. In 2010, the Sooners made it the College World Series for the first time since 1995 and defeated the South Carolina Gamecocks in the opening round. However, losses to Clemson and South Carolina in later rounds eliminated the Sooners. Golloway and the Sooners returned to the Super Regionals in 2012 and 2013, and they won the 2013 Big 12 Conference tournament title, which was only the second one in school history. During his time at Oklahoma, Golloway compiled a total record of 346–181–1 and a record of 116–97–1 in conference play. In his eight full seasons as head coach, Golloway averaged 41.75 wins per season.

=== Auburn ===
Auburn University from the Southeastern Conference hired Golloway after the 2013 season to take over their baseball program. His team went 28–28 (10–20 SEC) during the 2014 season, finishing 13th in the 14-team Southeastern Conference and missing the SEC Tournament. His 2015 team finished ninth in the SEC at 36–26 overall (13–17 SEC) and earned a bid to the NCAA Tallahassee Regional.

He was fired on September 27, 2015, and Auburn denied him the $1.25 million buyout due under his contract, claiming the firing was for cause. Golloway sued for wrongful termination and, after being cleared of any NCAA rules violations, he and Auburn reached a settlement in January 2018.

=== OK Instructs ===
After leaving Auburn, Golloway operated OK Instructs, a baseball academy, with Oklahoma native Mickey Tettleton.

=== Moore High School ===
On May 31, 2019, Moore High School in Moore, Oklahoma announced that it was hiring Golloway as a history teacher and head baseball coach.

=== East Central University ===
East Central University of the Division II Great American Conference announced the hiring of Golloway on May 25, 2022.

=== Northeastern State University ===
Northeastern State University of the Division II Mid-America Intercollegiate Athletics Association announced the hiring of Golloway on July 27, 2023.

== Head coaching record ==
Record table
Season	Team	Overall	Conference	Standing	Postseason
Oral Roberts Golden Eagles (Independent) (1996–1997)
1996	Oral Roberts	32–24			
1997	Oral Roberts	26–30			
Oral Roberts Golden Eagles (Mid-Continent Conference) (1998–2003)
1998	Oral Roberts	45–20	18–6	1st	NCAA Regional
1999	Oral Roberts	46–15	14–4	1st	NCAA Regional
2000	Oral Roberts	49–15	26–1	1st	NCAA Regional
2001	Oral Roberts	48–13	24–1	1st	NCAA Regional
2002	Oral Roberts	48–19	16–2	1st	NCAA Regional
2003	Oral Roberts	41–20	19–1	1st	NCAA Regional
Oral Roberts:		335–156 (.682)	117–15 (.886)		
Oklahoma Sooners (Big 12 Conference) (2005–2013)
2005	Oklahoma	12–6 (Note: Golloway served as the interim head coach of Oklahoma for part of the 2005 season.)	7–2	5th	NCAA Regional
2006	Oklahoma	45–22	17–10	3rd	NCAA Super Regional
2007	Oklahoma	34–24	11–16	7th	
2008	Oklahoma	36–26–1	9–17–1	8th	NCAA Regional
2009	Oklahoma	43–20	17–10	2nd	NCAA Regional
2010	Oklahoma	50–18	15–10	2nd	College World Series
2011	Oklahoma	41–19	14–11	3rd	NCAA Regional
2012	Oklahoma	42–25	13–10	4th	NCAA Super Regional
2013	Oklahoma	43–21	13–11	3rd	NCAA Super Regional
Oklahoma:		346–181–1 (.656)	116–97–1 (.544)		
Auburn Tigers (Southeastern Conference) (2014–2015)
2014	Auburn	28–28	10–20	7th (West)	
2015	Auburn	36–26	13–17	5th (West)	NCAA Regional
Auburn:		64–54 (.542)	23–37 (.383)		
East Central Tigers (Great American Conference) (2023–present)
2023	East Central	9–40	4–29	12th	
East Central:		9–40 (.184)	4–29 (.121)		
Northeastern State RiverHawks (Mid-America Intercollegiate Athletics Association) (2024–present)
2024	Northeastern State	20–30	11-22	9th	
Northeastern State:		20–40 (.333)	11–22 (.333)		
Total:		764–461–1 (.624)			
National champion Postseason invitational champion Conference regular season champion Conference regular season and conference tournament champion Division regular season champion Division regular season and conference tournament champion Conference tournament champion

== Personal ==
Golloway is of Hawaiian heritage. Born in Springfield, Missouri, he grew up in Stillwater, Oklahoma, and graduated from Stillwater High School in 1979. He attended Northeastern Oklahoma A&M Junior College in Miami, Oklahoma, for one year before transferring to Oklahoma Christian College where he received his bachelor's degree in business in 1984. He has also done graduate work at the University of Central Oklahoma and the University of Oklahoma.

Golloway's wife Charlotte died in 2021 after a battle with cancer. She is survived by their three children: Sunni Kate, Taylor, and Callen.

== See also ==
- Auburn Tigers baseball
- List of current NCAA Division I baseball coaches
- Oklahoma Sooners baseball
- 2010 College World Series
