= 2010 NCAA Division I baseball rankings =

2010 NCAA Division I baseball season
- Duration: February 19, 2010–June 30, 2010
- Number of teams: 301
- Preseason No. 1: Texas Longhorns

Tournament
- Duration: June 4–30, 2010
- Most conference bids: Pac-10, ACC and SEC (8)

College World Series
- Champions: South Carolina (1st title)
- Runners-up: UCLA
- MOP: Jackie Bradley Jr., South Carolina

Seasons
- ← 2009 2011 →

The following human polls make up the 2010 NCAA Division I men's baseball rankings. The USA Today/ESPN poll is voted on by a panel of 31 Division I baseball coaches. The Baseball America poll is voted on by staff members of the Baseball America magazine.

== Legend ==
	Increase in ranking
	Decrease in ranking
	Not ranked previous week
Italics	Number of first place votes
(#-#)	Win–loss record
т	Tied with team above or below also with this symbol

=== ESPN/USA Today Coaches' Poll ===
	Preseason Jan 27	Week 2 Mar 1	Week 3 Mar 8	Week 4 Mar 15	Week 5 Mar 22	Week 6 Mar 29	Week 7 Apr 5	Week 8 Apr 12	Week 9 Apr 19	Week 10 Apr 26	Week 11 May 3	Week 12 May 10	Week 13 May 17	Week 14 May 24	Week 15 May 31	Week 16 June 30	
1.	Texas 18	LSU (7–0)	LSU (11–0) 25	Arizona State (15–0) 20	Arizona State (20–0) 23	Arizona State (23–0) 27	Arizona State (25–1) 30	Arizona State (28–3) 16	Arizona State (31–3) 27	Texas (34–7) 23	Texas (38–7) 24	Texas (41–8) 25	Texas (43–8) 24	Texas (46–8) 24	Arizona State (47–8) 13	South Carolina 31 (54–16)	1.
2.	LSU 10	Virginia (6–1)	Florida State (10–0) 3	Virginia (12–3) 8	Virginia (17–3) 7	Georgia Tech (21–2)	Georgia Tech (25–3) 1	UCLA (25–3) 8	Texas (30–7) 2	Arizona State (33–5) 7	Arizona State (38–5) 7	Arizona State (39–5) 4	Virginia (43–9) 2	Arizona State (45–7) 6	Virginia (47–11) 12	UCLA (51–17)	2.
3.	Cal State Fullerton 2	Florida State (6–0)	Arizona State (11–0) 2	LSU (13–2) 2	Georgia Tech (16–2)	Virginia (20–4) 3	UCLA (23–1)	Virginia (27–7) 4	Georgia Tech (31–5)	Virginia (34–9) 1	Virginia (39–9)	Virginia (40–9) 2	Arizona State (42–6) 5	Virginia (45–10) 1	Texas (46–11) 6	TCU (54–14)	3.
4.	Virginia 1	Arizona State (7–0)	Virginia (9–2) 1	Georgia Tech (13–1) 1	LSU (16–3)	LSU (20–3)	LSU (23–4)	Texas (26–7) 2	Virginia (29–9) 2	Georgia Tech (34–7)	Coastal Carolina (39–6)	Coastal Carolina (41–6)	Coastal Carolina (45–6)	Coastal Carolina (47–7)	Coastal Carolina (51–7)	Clemson (45–25)	4.
5.	Florida State	Texas (5–2)	Georgia Tech (10–1)	Florida State (13–2)	Clemson (17–2)	UCLA (20–0) 1	Virginia (23–6)	Georgia Tech (27–5) 1	LSU (30–6)	UCLA (29–7)	Georgia Tech (36–9)	Florida (33–12)	Florida (31–12)	Florida (40–13)	Florida (42–15)	Oklahoma (50–18)	5.
6.	Rice	Florida (5–0)	Texas (8–3)	Texas (13–3)	UCLA (16–0) 1	Florida State (19–4)	Texas (21–7)	LSU (26–6)	UCLA (27–5)	Coastal Carolina (36–5)	Florida (31–11)	Georgia Tech (39–9)	Georgia Tech (41–10)	Georgia Tech (44–11)	TCU (46–11)	Florida State (48–20)	6.
7.	UC Irvine	Georgia Tech (7–1)	Clemson (9–1)	Clemson (13–1)	Florida State (15–4)	Texas (18–6)	Louisville (24–3)	Florida State (25–7)	Arkansas (31–6)	Arkansas (33–8)	South Carolina (34–9)	TCU (36–10)	South Carolina (41–11)	UCLA (41–11)	UCLA (43–13)	Arizona State (52–10)	7.
8.	Arizona State	TCU (5–1)	Florida (7–2)	TCU (12–2)	Texas (15–5)	Louisville (20–3)	Florida State (21–6)	Arkansas (26–6)	Coastal Carolina (32–5)	South Carolina (32–8)	TCU (34–9)	Florida State (36–12)	Florida State (39–13)	TCU (43–11)	Georgia Tech (45–13)	Florida (47–17)	8.
9.	Florida	Clemson (6–0)	TCU (8–2)	Louisville (14–1)	Florida (16–3)	Oklahoma (20–3)	Florida (20–7)	Florida (23–8)	Florida State (28–9)	LSU (32–9)	Florida State (33–11)	Louisville (40–8)	TCU (40–11)	South Carolina (43–13)	Cal State Fullerton (41–15)	Texas (50–13)	9.
10.	Georgia Tech	Coastal Carolina (6–1)	Coastal Carolina (10–1)	UCLA (13–0)	TCU (15–3)	Clemson (18–6)	Arkansas (22–6)	Coastal Carolina (27–5)	South Carolina (28–8)	Florida State (31–10)	Arkansas (35–10)	Arkansas (37–11)	UCLA (37–11)	Louisville (46–10)	Louisville (48–12)	Virginia (51–14)	10.
11.	North Carolina	Miami (FL) (5–1)	Louisville (11–0)	Florida (11–3)	Louisville (17–2)	Florida (18–5)	Clemson (20–8)	TCU (23–7)	Florida (25–10)	TCU (30–8)	Louisville (36–7)	UCLA (34–10)	Louisville (42–10)	Cal State Fullerton (37–15)	South Carolina (43–15)	Coastal Carolina (55–10)	11.
12.	TCU	North Carolina (6–1)	North Carolina (10–1)	Coastal Carolina (15–2)	Oklahoma (18–2)	TCU (17–5)	TCU (20–6)	Louisville (25–6)	TCU (27–7)	Florida (28–11)	UCLA (30–10)	South Carolina (36–11) T	Cal State Fullerton (34–14)	Arkansas (40–16)	Florida State (42–17)	Cal State Fullerton (46–18)	12.
13.	Miami Hurricanes baseball	Louisville (7–0)	UCLA (9–0)	Oklahoma (15–2)	Coastal Carolina (17–3)	Arkansas (18–5)	Coastal Carolina (23–5)	South Carolina (25–7)	Louisville (29–6)	Louisville (32–7)	Miami (FL) (34–11)	Miami (FL) (36–11) T	Miami (FL) (37–13)	Miami (FL) (39–15)	Oklahoma (44–15)	Vanderbilt (46–20)	13.
14.	Oregon State	Cal State Fullerton (2–4)	Miami (FL) (7–3)	Miami (FL) (10–4)	Miami (FL) (14–5)	Ole Miss (19–6)	Miami (FL) (20–7)	Oklahoma (25–7)	Miami (FL) (27–9)	Miami (FL) (29–11)	Ole Miss (33–13)	Cal State Fullerton (30–14)	Arkansas (38–14)	Florida State (39–16)	Miami (FL) (40–17)	Arkansas (43–21)	14.
15.	Clemson	Oregon State (5–2)	Oklahoma (11–1)	Arkansas (12–3)	Oregon State (14–3)	Coastal Carolina (19–5)	Oregon State (18–6)	Miami (FL) (23–9)	Vanderbilt (29–9)	Ole Miss (28–13)	LSU (32–13)	Oklahoma (35–13)	Vanderbilt (39–13)	Oklahoma (42–14)	Arkansas (40–18)	Miami (FL) (43–20)	15.
16.	Arkansas	UC Irvine (4–3)	Arkansas (8–2)	Vanderbilt (14–1)	Alabama (16–2)	Miami (FL) (16–7)	Oklahoma (22–6)	Clemson (23–10)	Kansas State (26–8)	Oklahoma (29–11)	Cal State Fullerton (27–14)	Ole Miss (34–15)	Oklahoma (37–14)	Auburn (39–17)	Auburn (40–19)	Louisville (50–14)	16.
17.	Ole Miss	Arkansas (5–1)	Ole Miss (9–2)	North Carolina (12–4)	Arkansas (13–5)	Vanderbilt (21–4)	South Carolina (22–6)	Oregon State (20–8)	Arizona (26–9)	Vanderbilt (32–11)	Oklahoma (32–12)	Vanderbilt (35–13)	Ole Miss (36–17)	Vanderbilt (40–15)	Vanderbilt (41–17)	Georgia Tech (47–15)	17.
18.	East Carolina	UCLA (6–0)	Oregon State (7–3)	Oregon State (10–3)	Ole Miss (15–5)	Oregon State (16–5)	Ole Miss (21–8)	Ole Miss (23–10)	Oklahoma (26–10)	Cal State Fullerton (24–13)	Vanderbilt (33–12)	Virginia Tech (34–15)	Auburn (35–17)	Clemson (37–19)	Connecticut (47–14)	Alabama (42–25)	18.
19.	Coastal Carolina	Ole Miss (6–1)	Rice (7–5)	Ole Miss (12–4)	North Carolina (15–6)	South Carolina (19–5)	Vanderbilt (24–6)	Vanderbilt (26–8)	Ole Miss (24–13)	Arizona (28–11)	Oregon (30–14)	Connecticut (37–10)	Connecticut (41–11)	Connecticut (43–12)	Rice (38–21)	Auburn (43–21)	19.
20.	Louisville	Rice (3–4)	Vanderbilt (10–1)	Kentucky (13–2)	Vanderbilt (16–4)	Arizona (20–5)	Kansas State (21–5)	Kansas State (23–6)	Clemson (23–14)	Kansas State (27–10)	Kansas State (30–12)	LSU (34–15)	Virginia Tech (36–16)	Rice (35–20)	Clemson (38–21)	Rice (40–23)	20.
21.	Ohio State	East Carolina (4–3)	East Carolina (7–3)	Alabama (12–1)	Texas A&M (15–4)	Kansas State (19–3)	UC Irvine (17–8)	Arizona (22–9)	Cal State Fullerton (20–13)	Connecticut (33–7)	Connecticut (35–9)	Auburn (33–15)	Rice (32–19)	Oregon (37–19)	UC Irvine (37–19)	Texas A&M (43–21–1)	21.
22.	Oklahoma	Oklahoma (6–1)	Kentucky (9–1)	Rice (10–7)	UC Irvine (13–6)	Texas A&M (17–6)	Arizona (20–8)	Western Kentucky (26–8)	Oregon State (20–11)	Oregon (27–13)	Arizona (29–13)	Clemson (31–17)	Clemson (33–19)	Ole Miss (36–20)	Ole Miss (38–22)	UC Irvine (39–21)	22.
23.	San Diego	South Carolina (4–2)	Ohio State (8–2)	Texas A&M (13–3)	South Carolina (16–4)	Southeastern Louisiana (22–3) T	Texas A&M (18–8–1)	Southeastern Louisiana (26–7)	California (22–11)	Stanford (21–13)	Virginia Tech (32–14)	Rice (30–17)	Oregon (34–18) T	San Diego (33–18)	LSU (40–20)	Connecticut (48–16)	23.
24.	Southern Miss	Stanford (4–3)	UC Irvine (6–5)	UC Irvine (9–6)	Kentucky (15–5)	Alabama (16–6) T	Southeastern Louisiana (24–5)	Cal State Fullerton (18–12)	Southeastern Louisiana (29–9)	Rice (26–16)	Clemson (27–17)	Kansas State (32–15)	Kansas State (34–16) T	UC Irvine (34–18)	Virginia Tech (38–20)	Ole Miss (39–24)	24.
25.	Stanford	Ohio State (5–1)	Alabama (8–1)	Kansas State (13–2)	Southeastern Louisiana (18–2)	Western Kentucky (20–5)	Alabama (19–8)	UC Irvine (18–11)	Oregon (23–12)	Clemson (25–16)	Rice (26–16)	San Diego (30–16)	San Diego (31–17)	Virginia Tech (36–19); Kansas State (35–18)	San Diego (36–20)	LSU (41–22)	25.
	Preseason Jan 27	Week 2 Mar 1	Week 3 Mar 8	Week 4 Mar 15	Week 5 Mar 22	Week 6 Mar 29	Week 7 Apr 5	Week 8 Apr 12	Week 9 Apr 19	Week 10 Apr 26	Week 11 May 3	Week 12 May 10	Week 13 May 17	Week 14 May 24	Week 15 May 31	Week 16 June 30	
		Dropped: San Diego (4–4); Southern Miss (4–3)	Dropped: Cal State Fullerton (4–6); South Carolina (6–4); Stanford (7–4)	Dropped: East Carolina (8–6); Ohio State (9–4)	Dropped: Rice (12–9); Kansas State (15–3)	Dropped: North Carolina (16–9); UC Irvine (14–8); Kentucky (16–8)	Dropped: Western Kentucky (22–7)	Dropped: Texas A&M (20–10–1); Alabama (21–11)	Dropped: Western Kentucky (27–12); UC Irvine (20–13)	Dropped: Oregon State (21–13); California (23–14); Southeastern Louisiana (30–12)	Dropped: Stanford (21–17)	Dropped: Oregon (30–18); Arizona (30–16)	Dropped: LSU (34–18)	None	Dropped: Oregon (38–22); Kansas State (36–20)	Dropped: Virginia Tech (40–22); San Diego (37–22)	

=== Baseball America Poll ===
	Preseason Jan 27	Week 1 Feb 22	Week 2 Mar 1	Week 3 Mar 8	Week 4 Mar 15	Week 5 Mar 22	Week 6 Mar 29	Week 7 Apr 5	Week 8 Apr 12	Week 9 Apr 19	Week 10 Apr 26	Week 11 May 3	Week 12 May 10	Week 13 May 17	Week 14 May 24	Week 15 May 31	Week 16 June 30	
1.	Texas	Virginia (2–1)	Virginia (6–1)	Virginia (9–2)	Virginia (12–3)	Virginia (17–3)	Virginia (20–4)	Arizona State (25–1)	UCLA (25–3)	Arizona State (31–3)	Virginia (34–9)	Virginia (39–9)	Virginia (40–9)	Virginia (43–9)	Virginia (45–10)	Virginia (47–11)	South Carolina (54–16)	1.
2.	Virginia	LSU (3–0)	LSU (7–0)	LSU (11–0)	Texas (13–3)	Florida (16–3)	Arizona State (23–0)	Georgia Tech (25–3)	Virginia (27–7)	Virginia (29–9)	Texas (34–7)	Texas (38–7)	Texas (41–8)	Texas (43–8)	Texas (46–8)	Arizona State (47–8)	UCLA (51–17)	2.
3.	LSU	Texas (1–2)	Texas (5–2)	Texas (8–3)	Georgia Tech (13–1)	Arizona State (20–0)	Georgia Tech (21–2)	UCLA (23–1)	Arizona State (28–3)	Texas (30–7)	Arizona State (33–5)	Arizona State (38–5)	Arizona State (39–5)	Arizona State (42–6)	Arizona State (45–7)	Texas (46–11)	TCU (54–14)	3.
4.	Cal State Fullerton	Georgia Tech (3–0)	Georgia Tech (7–1)	Georgia Tech (10–1)	TCU (12–2)	Georgia Tech (16–2)	Florida State (19–4)	Virginia (23–6)	Texas (26–7)	Georgia Tech (31–5)	Florida State (31–10)	Florida (31–11)	Florida (33–12)	Florida (37–12)	Florida (40–13)	Florida (42–15)	Arizona State (52–10)	4.
5.	Rice	Florida (3–0)	Florida (5–0)	Florida State (10–0)	Florida State (13–2)	TCU (15–3)	LSU (20–3)	LSU (23–4)	Georgia Tech (27–5)	UCLA (27–5)	UCLA (29–7)	Florida State (33–11)	Florida State (36–12)	Coastal Carolina (45–6)	Coastal Carolina (47–7)	Coastal Carolina (51–7)	Oklahoma (50–18)	5.
6.	Georgia Tech	UC Irvine (3–0)	Florida State (6–0)	Florida (7–2)	Florida (11–3)	Florida State (15–4)	UCLA (20–0)	Texas (21–7)	Florida State (25–7)	Florida State (28–9)	Florida (28–11)	South Carolina (34–9)	Coastal Carolina (41–6)	South Carolina (41–11)	TCU (43–11)	TCU (46–11)	Florida State (48–20)	6.
7.	Florida	Florida State (3–0)	TCU (5–1)	TCU (8–2)	LSU (13–2)	LSU (16–3)	Texas (18–6)	Florida State (21–6)	Florida (23–8)	Florida (25–10)	South Carolina (32–8)	Coastal Carolina (39–6)	TCU (36–10)	Florida State (39–13)	UCLA (41–11)	Cal State Fullerton (41–15)	Florida (47–17)	7.
8.	UC Irvine	Cal State Fullerton (1–2)	Coastal Carolina (7–1)	Coastal Carolina (10–1)	Coastal Carolina (15–2)	Texas (15–5)	Florida (18–5)	Florida (20–7)	LSU (26–6)	LSU (30–6)	Georgia Tech (34–7)	TCU (34–9)	South Carolina (36–11)	TCU (40–11)	Cal State Fullerton (37–15)	UCLA (43–13)	Virginia (51–14)	8.
9.	Florida State	Rice (0–3)	Rice (3–4)	Rice (7–5)	Louisville (14–1)	UCLA (16–0)	Louisville (20–3)	Louisville (24–3)	Arkansas (26–6)	Arkansas (31–6)	Arkansas (33–8)	Louisville (36–7)	Louisville (40–8)	Cal State Fullerton (34–14)	Louisville (46–10)	Louisville (48–12)	Texas (50–13)	9.
10.	South Carolina	South Carolina (3–0)	Louisville (7–0)	Louisville (11–0)	Arizona State (15–0)	Coastal Carolina (17–3)	Arkansas (18–5)	Arkansas (22–6)	South Carolina (25–7)	South Carolina (28–8)	Coastal Carolina (36–5)	Cal State Fullerton (27–14)	Cal State Fullerton (30–14)	UCLA (37–11)	South Carolina (43–13)	Florida State (42–17)	Clemson (45–25)	10.
11.	TCU	TCU (3–0)	UC Irvine (4–3)	Arizona State (11–0)	Clemson (13–1)	Louisville (17–2)	Ole Miss (19–6)	South Carolina (22–6)	TCU (23–7)	TCU (27–7)	TCU (30–8)	Ole Miss (33–13)	UCLA (34–10)	Louisville (42–10)	Georgia Tech (44–11)	Oklahoma (44–15)	Cal State Fullerton (46–18)	11.
12.	Coastal Carolina	Coastal Carolina (2–1)	Arizona State (7–0)	Clemson (9–1)	UCLA (13–0)	Clemson (17–2)	South Carolina (19–5)	TCU (20–6)	Coastal Carolina (27–5)	Coastal Carolina (32–5)	Louisville (32–7)	UCLA (30–10)	Arkansas (37–11)	Virginia Tech (36–16)	Oklahoma (42–14)	South Carolina (43–15)	Coastal Carolina (55–10)	12.
13.	Louisville	Louisville (3–0)	Clemson (6–0)	East Carolina (7–3)	Arkansas (12–3)	UC Irvine (13–6)	TCU (17–5)	Coastal Carolina (23–5)	Louisville (25–6)	Louisville (29–6)	Cal State Fullerton (24–13)	Miami (FL) (34–11)	Miami (FL) (36–11)	Georgia Tech (41–10)	Auburn (39–17)	Georgia Tech (45–13)	Arkansas (43–21)	13.
14.	Arizona State	Arizona State (3–0)	East Carolina (4–3)	Arkansas (8–2)	Rice (10–7)	South Carolina (16–4)	Coastal Carolina (19–5)	Miami (FL) (20–7)	Ole Miss (23–10)	Miami (FL) (27–9)	Ole Miss (28–13)	Arkansas (35–10)	Ole Miss (34–15)	Miami (FL) (37–13)	Florida State (39–16)	Auburn (39–17)	Vanderbilt (46–20)	14.
15.	Clemson	Clemson (3–0)	South Carolina (4–2)	UCLA (9–0)	UC Irvine (9–6)	Miami (FL) (14–5)	Miami (FL) (16–7)	Ole Miss (21–8)	Miami (FL) (23–9)	California (22–11)	LSU (32–9)	Oregon (30–14)	Virginia Tech (34–15)	Oklahoma (37–14)	Arkansas (40–16)	San Diego (36–20)	Miami (FL) (43–20)	15.
16.	Miami (FL)	Miami (FL) (3–0)	Miami (FL) (5–1)	UC Irvine (6–5)	South Carolina (11–4)	Arkansas (13–5)	Clemson (18–6)	Clemson (20–8)	Oklahoma (25–7)	Cal State Fullerton (20–13)	Miami (FL) (29–11)	Virginia Tech (32–14)	Georgia Tech (39–9)	Auburn (35–17)	San Diego (33–18)	Virginia Tech (38–20)	Alabama (42–25)	16.
17.	Arkansas	Arkansas (2–1)	Arkansas (5–1)	North Carolina (10–1)	Miami (FL) (10–4)	Oregon State (14–3)	Oklahoma (20–3)	Oregon State (18–6)	Clemson (23–10)	Arizona (26–9)	Oregon (27–13)	Georgia Tech (36–9)	Oklahoma (35–13)	Arkansas (38–14)	Miami (FL) (39–15)	Connecticut (47–14)	Louisville (50–14)	17.
18.	East Carolina	Stanford (3–0)	Cal State Fullerton (2–4)	Ole Miss (9–2)	Oregon State (10–3)	Ole Miss (15–5)	Western Kentucky (20–5)	UC Irvine (17–8)	Oregon State (20–8)	Oregon (23–12)	Virginia Tech (28–14)	Oklahoma (32–12)	Auburn (33–15)	Ole Miss (36–17)	Virginia Tech (36–19)	Rice (38–21)	Georgia Tech (47–15)	18.
19.	San Diego	San Diego (3–1)	UCLA (6–0)	South Carolina (6–4)	Vanderbilt (14–1)	Stanford (10–4)	Stanford (12–6)	Oklahoma (22–6)	Western Kentucky (26–8)	Ole Miss (24–13)	Arizona (28–11)	Auburn (30–15)	San Diego (30–16)	San Diego (31–17)	Connecticut (43–12)	Arkansas (40–18)	Auburn (43–21)	19.
20.	North Carolina	North Carolina (3–0)	North Carolina (6–1)	Miami (FL) (7–3)	East Carolina (8–6)	Alabama (16–2)	Vanderbilt (21–4)	Vanderbilt (24–6)	Virginia Tech (23–11)	Virginia Tech (24–13)	Connecticut (33–7)	Connecticut (35–9)	Connecticut (37–10)	Connecticut (41–11)	Rice (35–20)	Miami (FL) (40–17)	Virginia Tech (40–22)	20.
21.	Southern Miss	Southern Miss (2–1)	Ole Miss (6–1)	Oregon State (7–3)	Ole Miss (12–4)	Oklahoma (18–2)	Oregon State (16–5)	Western Kentucky (22–7)	California (20–10)	Connecticut (27–7)	Stanford (21–13)	California (26–15)	Rice (30–17)	Rice (32–19)	Oregon (37–19)	UC Irvine (37–19)	Rice (40–23)	21.
22.	Georgia	East Carolina (1–2)	Oregon State (5–2)	Kentucky (9–1)	Kentucky (13–2)	Western Kentucky (16–5)	Arizona (20–5)	Stanford (13–9)	Cal State Fullerton (18–12)	Stanford (18–13)	Oklahoma (29–11)	San Diego (26–16)	Oregon (30–18)	Oregon (34–18)	Washington State (31–18)	Texas A&M (40–19)	UC Irvine (39–21)	22.
23.	UCLA	UCLA (3–0)	Kentucky (6–0)	Stanford (7–4)	Stanford (7–4)	Texas A&M (15–4)	Texas A&M (17–6)	Texas A&M (18–8)	Auburn (22–11)	Vanderbilt (29–9)	California (23–14)	Arizona (29–13)	Vanderbilt (35–13)	Vanderbilt (39–13)	UC Irvine (34–18)	LSU (40–20)	Texas A&M (43–21)	23.
24.	Ole Miss	Ole Miss (2–1)	Stanford (4–3)	Vanderbilt (10–1)	North Carolina (12–4)	Vanderbilt (16–4)	UC Irvine (14–8)	Alabama (19–8)	Arizona (22–9)	Oklahoma (26–10)	San Diego (23–15)	LSU (32–13)	Pittsburgh (34–12)	Washington State (28–18)	Vanderbilt (40–15)	Washington State (31–18)	Washington State (37–22)	24.
25.	Oregon State	Oregon State (2–1)	Georgia (6–2)	Oklahoma (11–1)	Oklahoma (15–2)	Rice (12–9)	Alabama (16–6)	Virginia Tech (20–10)	Connecticut (22–7)	Southeastern Louisiana (29–9)	Rice (26–16)	Rice (26–16)	Stanford (25–18)	UC Irvine (32–17)	Clemson (37–19)	Vanderbilt (40–15)	Oregon (40–24)	25.
	Preseason Jan 27	Week 1 Feb 22	Week 2 Mar 1	Week 3 Mar 8	Week 4 Mar 15	Week 5 Mar 22	Week 6 Mar 29	Week 7 Apr 5	Week 8 Apr 12	Week 9 Apr 19	Week 10 Apr 26	Week 11 May 3	Week 12 May 10	Week 13 May 17	Week 14 May 24	Week 15 May 31	Week 16 June 30	
		Dropped: Georgia	Dropped: San Diego; Southern Miss	Dropped: Cal State Fullerton; Georgia	None	Dropped: East Carolina; Kentucky; North Carolina	Dropped: Rice	Dropped: Arizona	Dropped: UC Irvine; Vanderbilt; Stanford; Texas A&M; Alabama	Dropped: Clemson; Oregon State; Western Kentucky; Auburn	Dropped: Vanderbilt; Southeastern Louisiana	Dropped: Stanford	Dropped: California; Arizona; LSU	Dropped: Pittsburgh; Stanford	Dropped: Ole Miss	Dropped: Oregon; Clemson	Dropped: San Diego; Connecticut; LSU	

=== Collegiate Baseball Poll ===
	Preseason Dec 21	Week 1 Feb 22	Week 2 Mar 1	Week 3 Mar 8	Week 4 Mar 15	Week 5 Mar 22	Week 6 Mar 29	Week 7 Apr 5	Week 8 Apr 12	Week 9 Apr 19	Week 10 Apr 26	Week 11 May 3	Week 12 May 10	Week 13 May 17	Week 14 May 24	Week 15 May 31	Week 16 June 8	Week 17 June 14	Week 18 July 1	
1.	Texas	LSU (3–0)	LSU (7–0)	LSU (11–0)	Arizona State (15–0)	Arizona State (20–0)	Arizona State (23–0)	Arizona State (25–1)	Arizona State (28–3)	Arizona State (31–3)	Texas (24–7)	Texas (38–7)	Texas (41–8)	Texas (43–8)	Texas (46–8)	Arizona State (47–8)	Arizona State (50–8)	Arizona State (52–8)	South Carolina (54–16)	1.
2.	LSU	Arizona State (3–0)	Arizona State (7–0)	Arizona State (11–0)	Virginia (12–3)	Virginia (17–3)	UCLA (20–0)	UCLA (23–1)	UCLA (25–3)	Texas (30–7)	Arizona State (33–5)	Arizona State (38–5)	Arizona State (39–5)	Virginia (43–9)	Virginia (45–10)	Virginia (47–11)	Texas (49–11)	UCLA (48–14)	UCLA (51–17)	2.
3.	Virginia	Georgia Tech (3–0)	Virginia (6–1)	Florida State (10–0)	LSU (13–2)	UCLA (16–0)	Virginia (20–4)	Georgia Tech (25–3)	Texas (26–7)	Georgia Tech (31–5)	South Carolina (32–8)	Virginia (39–9)	Virginia (40–9)	Arizona State (42–6)	Arizona State (45–7)	Coastal Carolina (51–7)	Virginia (50–12)	Florida (47–15)	TCU (54–14)	3.
4.	Cal State Fullerton	Texas (1–2)	Texas (5–2)	Virginia (9–2)	Georgia Tech (13–1)	LSU (16–3)	LSU (20–3)	LSU (23–4)	Virginia (27–7)	Arkansas (31–6)	Coastal Carolina (36–5)	South Carolina (34–9)	Coastal Carolina (41–6)	Coastal Carolina (45–6)	Florida (40–13)	Cal State Fullerton (41–15)	Coastal Carolina (55–8)	TCU (51–12)	Clemson (45–35)	4.
5.	Arizona State	Virginia (2–1)	Georgia Tech (7–1)	Georgia Tech (10–1)	Florida State (13–2)	Georgia Tech (16–2)	Georgia Tech (21–2)	Virginia (23–6)	South Carolina (25–7)	South Carolina (28–8)	Virginia (34–9)	Coastal Carolina (39–6)	Miami (36–11)	Florida (37–12)	Coastal Carolina (47–7)	Texas (46–11)	Cal State Fullerton (45–16)	South Carolina (48–15)	Oklahoma (50–18)	5.
6.	Georgia Tech	Cal State Fullerton (1–2)	Florida State (6–0)	Texas (8–3)	Texas (13–3)	Clemson (17–2)	Florida State (19–4)	Texas (21–7)	Georgia Tech (27–5)	LSU (30–6)	Georgia Tech (34–7)	Florida (31–11)	Florida (33–12)	South Carolina (41–11)	Cal State Fullerton (37–15)	Florida (42–15)	UCLA (46–13)	Oklahoma (49–16)	Florida State (48–20)	6.
7.	Florida State	Florida State (3–0)	Florida (5–0)	Coastal Carolina (10–1)	UCLA (13–0)	Florida State (15–4)	Texas (18–6)	Louisville (24–3)	LSU (26–6)	Coastal Carolina (32–5)	Florida (28–11)	Miami (34–11)	South Carolina (36–11)	Cal State Fullerton (34–14)	South Carolina (43–13)	TCU (46–11)	Florida (45–15)	Florida State (47–18)	Arizona State (52–10)	7.
8.	UC Irvine	UC Irvine (3–0)	Coastal Carolina (7–1)	Louisville (11–0)	Coastal Carolina (15–2)	Florida (16–3)	Louisville (20–3)	South Carolina (22–6)	Arkansas (26–6)	UCLA (27–5)	Arkansas (33–8)	Florida State (33–11)	Georgia Tech (39–9)	Georgia Tech (41–10)	UCLA (41–11)	South Carolina (43–15)	TCU (49–11)	Clemson (43–23)	Florida (47–17)	8.
9.	Florida	Florida (3–0)	TCU (5–1)	Florida (7–2)	Louisville (14–1)	Oregon State (14–3)	Oklahoma (20–3)	Miami (20–7)	Coastal Carolina (27–5)	Miami (27–9)	UCLA (29–7)	Georgia Tech (36–9)	Cal State Fullerton (30–14)	Miami (37–13)	Georgia Tech (44–11)	UCLA (43–13)	South Carolina (46–15)	Texas (50–13)	Texas (50–13)	9.
10.	Oregon State	Oregon State (2–1)	Oregon State (5–2)	UCLA (9–0)	Clemson (13–1)	Texas (15–5)	Oregon State (16–5)	Oregon State (18–6)	Florida State (25–7)	Virginia (29–9)	Florida State (31–10)	Louisville (36–7)	Florida State (36–12)	UCLA (37–11)	Miami (39–15)	Georgia Tech (45–13)	Miami (43–18)	Virginia (51–14)	Virginia (51–14)	10.
11.	Rice	Miami (3–0)	Miami (5–1)	TCU (8–2)	Florida (11–3)	Coastal Carolina (17–3)	Ole Miss (19–6)	Florida State (21–6)	Oklahoma (25–7)	Florida State (28–9)	Miami (29–11)	TCU (34–9)	Louisville (40–8)	Florida State (39–13)	TCU (43–11)	Miami (40–17)	Oklahoma (47–15)	Coastal Carolina (55–10)	Coastal Carolina (55–10)	11.
12.	Miami	North Carolina (3–0)	Clemson (6–0)	Oregon State (7–3)	TCU (12–2)	Louisville (17–2)	Florida (18–5)	Oklahoma (22–6)	Florida (23–8)	Florida (25–10)	Cal State Fullerton (24–13)	Cal State Fullerton (27–14)	TCU (36–10)	TCU (40–11)	Louisville (46–10)	Louisville (48–12)	Florida State (45–17)	Cal State Fullerton (46–18)	Cal State Fullerton (46–18)	12.
13.	North Carolina	Ohio State (3–0)	Louisville (7–0)	Clemson (9–1)	Oregon State (10–3)	Oklahoma (18–2(	Clemson (18–6)	Florida (20–7)	Miami (23–9)	Louisville (29–6)	Connecticut (33–7)	Ole Miss (33–13)	UCLA (34–10)	Louisville (42–10)	Oklahoma (42–14)	Oklahoma (44–15)	Clemson (41–22)	Miami (43–20)	Miami (43–20)	13.
14.	Ohio State	TCU (3–0)	UCLA (6–0)	North Carolina (10–1)	Oklahoma (15–2)	TCU (15–3)	South Carolina (19–5)	Coastal Carolina (23–5)	Oregon State (20–8)	TCU (27–7)	Louisville (32–7)	Arkansas (35–10)	Arkansas (37–11)	Oklahoma (37–14)	Auburn (39–17)	Auburn (40–19)	Vanderbilt (45–18)	Vanderbilt (46–20)	Vanderbilt (46–20)	14.
15.	TCU	Clemson (3–0)	North Carolina (6–1)	Miami (7–3)	Miami (10–4)	Miami (14–5)	Coastal Carolina (19–5)	Clemson (20–8)	Louisville (25–6)	California (22–11)	TCU (30–8)	UCLA (30–10)	Ole Miss (34–15)	San Diego (31–17)	San Diego (33–18)	Florida State (42–17)	Arkansas (43–19)	Arkansas (43–21)	Arkansas (43–21)	15.
16.	Clemson	Louisville (3–0)	Ohio State (5–1)	Oklahoma (11–1)	Arkansas (12–3)	Alabama (16–2)	TCU (17–5)	Arkansas (22–6)	Clemson (23–10)	Cal State Fullerton (20–13)	Ole Miss (28–13)	Connecticut (35–9)	Oklahoma (35–13)	Auburn (35–17)	Clemson (37–19)	Clemson (38–21)	Alabama (41–23)	Alabama (42–25)	Alabama (42–25)	16.
17.	Coastal Carolina	UCLA (3–0)	Oklahoma (6–1)	Ohio State (8–2)	Southeastern Louisiana (15–1)	Ole Miss (15–5)	Miami (16–7)	Ole Miss (21–8)	TCU (23–7)	Kansas State (26–8)	LSU (32–9)	Oklahoma (32–12)	San Diego (30–16)	Ole Miss (36–17)	Florida State (39–16)	Vanderbilt (41–17)	Georgia Tech (47–15)	Georgia Tech (47–15)	Georgia Tech (47–15)	17.
18.	East Carolina	Stanford (3–0)	Ole Miss (6–1)	Ole Miss (9–2)	Vanderbilt (14–1)	South Carolina (16–4)	Arizona (20–5)	TCU (20–6)	Ole Miss (23–10)	Arizona (26–9)	Stanford (21–13)	California (26–15)	Auburn (33–15)	Arkansas (38–14)	Arkansas (40–16)	Arkansas (40–18)	Texas A&M (43–21–1)	Texas A&M (43–21–1)	Texas A&M (43–21–1)	18.
19.	Louisville	New Mexico (2–1)	Arkansas (5–1)	Arkansas (8–2)	Kansas (11–4)	Arizona (16–4)	Arkansas (18–5)	UC Irvine (17–8)	California (20–10)	Connecticut (27–7)	Oklahoma (29–11)	Oregon (30–14)	California (27–17)	Connecticut (41–11)	Vanderbilt (40–15)	San Diego (36–20)	Louisville (50–14)	Louisville (50–14)	Louisville (50–14)	19.
20.	UCLA	Oklahoma (4–0)	New Mexico (5–2)	East Carolina (7–3)	Ole Miss (12–4)	Arkansas (13–5)	Kansas State (19–3)	New Mexico State (22–10)	Kansas State (23–6)	Oklahoma (26–10)	California (23–14)	Pittsburgh (31–11)	Connecticut (37–10)	Vanderbilt (39–13)	Washington State (31–18)	Texas A&M (40–19–1)	Auburn (43–21)	Auburn (43–21)	Auburn (43–21)	20.
21.	Southern Miss	Coastal Carolina (2–1)	East Carolina (4–3)	Wichita State (7–1)	Alabama (12–1)	Southeastern Louisiana (18–2)	Western Kentucky (20–5)	Kansas State (21–5)	Western Kentucky (26–8)	Rutgers (21–13)	Arizona (28–11)	Virginia Tech (32–14)	Virginia Tech (34–15)	Virginia Tech (36–13)	Ole Miss (36–20)	LSU (40–20)	Washington State (37–22)	Washington State (37–22)	Washington State (37–22)	21.
22.	Ole Miss	East Carolina (1–2)	South Carolina (4–2)	New Mexico (8–4)	North Carolina (12–4)	Ohio State (12–4)	Southeastern Louisiana (22–3)	Southeastern Louisiana (24–5)	Cal State Fullerton (18–12)	Stanford (18–13)	Kansas State (27–10)	Portland (30–9)	Pittsburgh (34–12)	Rice (32–19)	Connecticut (43–12)	Connecticut (47–14)	UC Irvine (39–21)	UC Irvine (39–21)	UC Irvine (39–21)	22.
23.	Arkansas	South Carolina (3–0)	Western Kentucky (5–1)	South Carolina (6–4)	South Carolina (11–4)	Vanderbilt (16–4)	Vanderbilt (21–4)	Vanderbilt (24–6)	Auburn (21–11)	Oregon (23–12)	Oregon (27–13)	San Diego (26–16)	Rice (30–17)	UC Irvine (32–17)	Rice (35–20)	Washington State (34–20)	St. John's (43–20)	St. John's (43–20)	St. John's (43–20)	23.
24.	San Diego	San Diego (3–1)	Wichita State (3–0)	Kentucky (9–1)	New Mexico (13–5)	UC Irvine (13–6)	Pittsburgh (18–4)	Western Kentucky (22–7)	Pittsburgh (22–8)	Pittsburgh (26–9)	Pittsburgh (30–10)	Auburn (30–15)	Vanderbilt (35–13)	Washington State (28–18)	UC Irvine (34–18)	Ole Miss (38–22)	Ole Miss (39–24)	Ole Miss (39–24)	Ole Miss (39–24)	24.
25.	Oklahoma	Oregon (2–1)	Kentucky (6–0)	Washington State (9–1)	Wichita State (10–3)	Texas A&M (15–4)	The Citadel (18–6)	Rice (17–12)	Virginia Tech (23–11)	Oregon State (20–11)	Virginia Tech (28–14)	New Mexico State (35–12–1)	Fresno State (30–20)	California (27–18)	Stanford (30–21)	Rice (38–21)	LSU (41–22)	LSU (41–22)	LSU (41–22)	25.
26.	Stanford	Southern Miss (2–1)	UC Irvine (4–3)	Southeastern Louisiana (11–1)	Kentucky (13–2)	Stanford (10–4)	UC Irvine (14–8)	Cal State Fullerton (15–11)	VMI (28–5)	Clemson (23–14)	Portland (27–9)	Arizona (29–13)	Clemson (31–17)	Arizona (31–17)	Texas A&M (26–19–1)	UC Irvine (37–19)	Rice (40–23)	Rice (40–23)	Rice (40–23)	26.
27.	Wichita State	Wichita State (0–0)	Stanford (4–3)	Vanderbilt (10–1)	Ohio State (9–4)	North Carolina (15–6)	Texas A&M (17–6)	Charlotte (19–6)	Fresno State (20–13)	Ole Miss (24–13)	Auburn (27–14)	Kansas State (30–12)	Southern Miss (29–17)	Fresno State (32–22)	Fresno State (35–23)	Southern Miss (35–22)	Oregon (40–24)	Oregon (40–24)	Oregon (40–24)	27.
28.	South Carolina	Ole Miss (2–1)	Washington State (6–0)	NC State (10–1)	Texas A&M (13–3)	VMI (18–2)	Stanford (12–6)	NC State (18–10)	Washington State (17–11)	Vanderbilt (29–9)	Rice (26–16)	Rice (26–16)	Kansas State (32–15)	Clemson (33–19)	Florida Gulf Coast (37–18)	Stanford (31–23)	Connecticut (48–16)	Connecticut (48–16)	Connecticut (48–16)	28.
29.	Texas A&M	Texas A&M (3–0)	Southeastern Louisiana (7–0)	Stanford (7–4)	Stanford (7–4)	Auburn (14–5)	VMI (20–4)	VMI (23–5)	Southeastern Louisiana (26–7)	Auburn (24–13)	UC Irvine (24–13)	Texas State (28–14)	Texas State (30–16)	Southern Miss (30–19)	Oregon (37–19)	California (39–23)	College of Charleston (44–19)	College of Charleston (44–19)	College of Charleston (44–19)	29.
30.	Minnesota	Arkansas (2–1)	Vanderbilt (6–1)	Alabama (8–1)	VMI (14–1)	Wichita State (11–5)	Wichita State (14–7)	California (16–10)	Vanderbilt (26–8)	Northwestern State (25–10)	Texas State 24–14	UC Irvine (27–14)	UC Irvine (29–16)	Kansas State (34–16)	Southern Miss (32–21)	St. John's (40–18)	Hawaii (35–28)	Hawaii (35–28)	Hawaii (35–28)	30.
	Preseason Dec 21	Week 1 Feb 22	Week 2 Mar 1	Week 3 Mar 8	Week 4 Mar 15	Week 5 Mar 22	Week 6 Mar 29	Week 7 Apr 5	Week 8 Apr 12	Week 9 Apr 19	Week 10 Apr 26	Week 11 May 3	Week 12 May 10	Week 13 May 17	Week 14 May 24	Week 15 May 31	Week 16 June 8	Week 17 June 14	Week 18 July 1	
		Dropped: 11 Rice; 30 Minnesota	Dropped: 6 Cal State Fullerton; 24 San Diego; 25 Oregon; 26 Southern Miss; 29 Texas A&M	Dropped: 23 Western Kentucky; 26 UC Irvine	Dropped: 24 Kentucky; 25 Washington State; 28 NC State	Dropped: 19 Kansas; 24 New Mexico; 26 Kentucky	Dropped: 16 Alabama; 22 Ohio State; 27 North Carolina; 29 Auburn	Dropped: 24 Pittsburgh; 25 The Citadel; 27 Texas A&M; 28 Stanford; 30 Wichita State	Dropped: 19 UC Irvine; 20 New Mexico State; 25 Rice; 27 Charlotte; 28 NC State	Dropped: 21 Western Kentucky; 25 Virginia Tech; 26 VMI; 27 Fresno State; 28 Washington State; 29 Southeastern Louisiana	Dropped: 21 Rutgers; 25 Oregon State; 26 Clemson; 28 Vanderbilt; 30 Northwestern State	Dropped: 17 LSU; 18 Stanford	Dropped: 22 Portland; 25 New Mexico State; 26 Arizona; 28 Rice	Dropped: 22 Pittsburgh; 29 Texas State	Dropped: 21 Virginia Tech; 25 California; 26 Arizona; 30 Kansas State	Dropped: 27 Fresno State; 28 Florida Gulf Coast; 29 Oregon	Dropped: 26 UC Irvine; 27 Southern Miss; 28 Stanford; 29 California	None	None	

=== NCBWA ===
	Preseason Feb 1	Week 1 Feb 22	Week 2 Mar 1	Week 3 Mar 8	Week 4 Mar 15	Week 5 Mar 22	Week 6 Mar 29	Week 7 Apr 5	Week 8 Apr 12	Week 9 Apr 19	Week 10 Apr 26	Week 11 May 3	Week 12 May 10	Week 13 May 17	Week 14 May 24	Week 15 May 31	Week 16 June 15	Week 17 June 29	
1.	Texas	LSU (3–0)	LSU (7–0)	LSU (11–0)	Virginia (12–3)	Virginia (17–3)	Arizona State (23–0)	Arizona State (25–1)	Virginia (27–7)	Arizona state (31–3)	Texas (34–7)	Texas (38–7)	Texas (41–8)	Texas (43–8)	Texas (46–8)	Virginia (47–11)	Arizona State (52–8)	South Carolina (54–16)	1.
2.	LSU	Florida State (3–0)	Virginia (6–1)	Florida State (4–0)	Arizona State (15–0)	Arizona State (20–0)	Virginia (20–4)	Georgia Tech (25–3)	Arizona State (28–3)	Texas (30–7)	Virginia (34–9)	Virginia (39–9)	Virginia (40–9)	Virginia (43–9)	Virginia (45–10)	Arizona State (47–18)	Florida (47–15)	UCLA (51–17)	2.
3.	Virginia	Virginia (2–1)	Florida State (6–0)	Arizona State (4–0)	Georgia Tech (13–1)	Georgia Tech (16–2)	Georgia Tech (21–2)	LSU (23–4)	Texas (26–7)	Georgia Tech (31–5)	Arizona State (33–5)	Arizona State (38–5)	Arizona State (39–5)	Arizona State (42–6)	Arizona State (45–7)	Coastal Carolina (51–7)	TCU (51–12)	TCU (54–14)	3.
4.	Cal State Fullerton	UC Irvine (3–0)	Arizona State (7–0)	Virginia (9–2)	Florida State (13–2)	LSU (16–3)	LSU (20–3)	UCLA (23–1)	UCLA (25–3)	Virginia (29–9)	Georgia Tech (34–7)	TCU (34–9)	TCU (36–10)	Coastal Carolina (45–6)	Florida (40–13)	Texas (46–11)	UCLA (48–14)	Clemson (42–25)	4.
5.	Rice	Georgia Tech (3–0)	Florida (5–0)	Georgia Tech (10–1)	Texas (13–3)	Florida (16–3)	Florida State (19–4)	Virginia (23–6)	Georgia Tech (27–5)	LSU (30–6)	TCU (30–8)	Coastal Carolina (39–6)	Coastal Carolina (41–6)	Florida (37–12)	Coastal Carolina (47–7)	TCU (46–11)	South Carolina (48–15)	Oklahoma (50–18)	5.
6.	Florida State	Arizona State (3–0)	Texas (5–2)	Texas (8–3)	LSU (13–2)	Florida State (15–4)	UCLA (20–0)	Texas (21–7)	LSU (26–6)	Arkansas (31–6)	Coastal Carolina (36–5)	Florida (31–11)	Florida (33–12)	TCU (40–11)	TCU (43–11)	Florida (42–15)	Oklahoma (49–16)	Florida State (48–20)	6.
7.	UC Irvine	Florida (3–0)	Georgia Tech (7–1)	Florida (7–2)	TCU (12–2)	TCU (15–3)	Texas (18–6)	Louisville (24–3)	Arkansas (26–6)	UCLA (27–5)	Arkansas (33–8)	Georgia Tech (36–9)	Georgia Tech (39–9)	Georgia Tech (41–10)	Georgia Tech (44–11)	Cal State Fullerton (41–15)	Florida State (47–18)	Arizona State (52–10)	7.
8.	Arizona State	Texas (1–2)	TCU (5–1)	TCU (8–2)	Florida (11–3)	Clemson (17–2)	Louisville (20–3)	Florida State (21–6)	Florida State (25–7)	TCU (27–7)	Florida State (31–10)	Florida State (33–11)	Florida State (36–12)	Florida State (39–13)	UCLA (41–11)	UCLA (43–13)	Clemson (43–23)	Florida (47–17)	8.
9.	Georgia Tech	TCU (3–0)	Clemson (6–0)	Clemson (9–1)	Clemson (13–1)	Texas (15–5)	Florida (18–5)	Arkansas (22–6)	Florida (23–8)	Coastal Carolina (32–5)	UCLA (29–7)	Louisville (36–7)	Louisville (40–8)	South Carolina (41–11)	Louisville (46–10)	Louisville (48–12)	Texas (50–13)	Texas (50–13)	9.
10.	Florida	Miami (3–0)	Miami (5–1)	Louisville (11–0)	Louisville (14–1)	Louisville (17–2)	Arkansas (18–5)	Florida (20–7)	TCU (23–7)	Florida State (28–9)	Florida (28–11)	Arkansas (35–10)	Arkansas (37–11)	UCLA (37–11)	South Carolina (43–13)	Georgia Tech (45–13)	Virginia (51–14)	Virginia (51–14)	10.
11.	TCU	Cal State Fullerton (1–2)	Louisville (7–0)	North Carolina (10–1)	Miami (10–4)	UCLA (16–0)	TCU (17–5)	TCU (20–6)	Coastal Carolina (27–5)	Louisville (29–6)	LSU (32–9)	South Carolina (34–9)	Miami (36–11)	Louisville (42–10)	Cal State Fullerton (37–15)	Oklahoma (44–15)	Coastal Carolina (55–10)	Coastal Carolina (55–10)	11.
12.	Miami	North Carolina (3–0)	North Carolina (6–1)	Coastal Carolina (10–1)	Coastal Carolina (15–2)	Miami (14–5)	Clemson (18–6)	Miami (20–7)	Louisville (25–6)	Florida (25–10)	Louisville (32–7)	Miami (34–11)	UCLA (34–10)	Cal State Fulleron (34–14)	Oklahoma (42–14)	Florida State (42–17)	Cal State Fullerton (46–18)	Cal State Fullerton (46–18)	12.
13.	North Carolina	Clemson (3–0)	Coastal Carolina (7–1)	Miami (7–3)	UCLA (13–0)	Oregon State (14–3)	Oklahoma (20–3)	Coastal Carolina (23–5)	South Carolina (25–7)	Miami (27–9)	South Carolina (32–8)	UCLA (30–10)	South Carolina (36–11)	Miami (37–13)	Florida State (39–16)	South Carolina (43–15)	Miami (43–20)	Miami (43–20)	13.
14.	Clemson	Rice (0–3)	UC Irvine (4–3)	Arkansas (8–2)	Arkansas (12–3)	Coastal Carolina (17–3)	Ole Miss (19–6)	Clemson (20–8)	Miami (23–9)	South Carolina (28–8)	Miami (29–11)	Oklahoma (32–12)	Oklahoma (35–13)	Arkansas (38–14)	Miami (39–15)	Miami (40–17)	Arkansas (43–21)	Arkansas (43–21)	14.
15.	Arkansas	Louisville (3–0)	Arkansas (5–1)	Rice (7–5)	Oregon State (10–3)	Oklahoma (18–2)	Miami (16–7)	Oregon State (18–6)	Oklahoma (25–7)	Vanderbilt (29–9)	Oklahoma (29–11)	Ole Miss (33–13)	Cal State Fullerton (30–14)	Oklahoma (37–14)	Arkansas (40–16)	Auburn (40–19)	Vanderbilt (46–20)	Vanderbilt (46–20)	15.
16.	East Carolina	Arkansas (2–1)	Rice (3–4)	UCLA (9–0)	Oklahoma (15–2)	Arkansas (13–5)	Oregon State (16–5)	South Carolina (22–6)	Oregon State (20–8)	Arizona (26–9)	Cal State Fullerton (24–13)	Cal State Fullerton (27–14)	Virginia Tech (34–15)	Vanderbilt (39–13)	Auburn (39–17)	Connecticut (47–14)	Georgia Tech (47–15)	Georgia Tech (47–15)	16.
17.	Coastal Carolina	Stanford (3–0)	Cal State Fullerton (2–4)	East Carolina (7–3)	North Carolina (12–4)	North Carolina (15–6)	Coastal Carolina (19–5)	Oklahoma (22–6)	Clemson (23–10)	Oklahoma (26–10)	Ole Miss (28–13)	LSU (32–13)	Vanderbilt (35–13)	Virginia Tech (36–16)	Clemson (37–19)	Rice (38–21)	Louisville (50–14)	Louisville (50–14)	17.
18.	Oregon State	South Carolina (3–0)	Oregon State (5–2)	Oregon State (7–3)	Vanderbilt (14–1)	UC Irvine (13–6)	Vanderbilt (21–4)	Ole Miss (21–8)	Vanderbilt (26–8)	Kansas State (26–8)	Vanderbilt (32–11)	Virginia Tech (32–14)	Ole Miss (34–15)	Connecticut (41–11)	Connecticut (43–12)	Arkansas (40–18)	Alabama (42–25)	Alabama (42–25)	18.
19.	Louisville	Coastal Carolina (2–1)	East Carolina (4–3)	Oklahoma (11–1)	Rice (10–7)	Ole Miss (15–5)	South Carolina (19–5)	Vanderbilt (24–6)	Ole Miss (23–10)	Cal State Fullerton (20–13)	Arizona (28–11)	Vanderbilt (33–12)	Clemson (31–17)	Ole Miss (36–17)	Vanderbilt (40–15)	UC Irvine (37–19)	Auburn (43–21)	Auburn (43–21)	19.
20.	Ole Miss	Oregon State (2–1)	UCLA (6–0)	Ole Miss (9–2)	Kentucky (13–2)	Alabama (16–2)	Arizona (20–5)	North Carolina (20–10)	Western Kentucky (26–8)	Southeastern Louisiana (29–9)	Connecticut (33–7)	Arizona (29–13)	LSU (34–15)	Clemson (33–19)	Rice (35–20)	Clemson (38–21)	UC Irvine (39–21)	UC Irvine (39–21)	20.
21.	South Carolina	East Carolina (1–2)	Ole Miss (6–1)	Vanderbilt (10–1)	UC Irvine (9–6)	South Carolina (16–4)	Southeastern Louisiana (22–3)	UC Irvine (17–8)	North Carolina (22–12)	East Carolina (24–12)	Virginia Tech (28–14)	Oregon (30–14)	North Carolina (31–17)	Auburn (35–17)	UC Irvine (34–18)	Virginia Tech (38–20)	Rice (40–23)	Rice (40–23)	21.
22.	Southern Miss	Oklahoma (4–0)	Oklahoma (6–0)	UC Irvine (6–4)	Ole Miss (12–4)	Rice (12–9)	North Carolina (16–9)	Southeastern Louisiana (24–5)	Arizona (22–9)	Oregon State (2011)	Stanford (21–13)	Clemson (27–17)	Connecticut (37–10)	Rice (32–19)	Virginia Tech (36–19)	Vanderbilt (41–17)	Connecticut (48–16)	Connecticut (48–16)	22.
23.	Ohio State	Ohio State (3–0)	Ohio State (5–1)	Ohio State (8–2)	Alabama (12–1)	Vanderbilt (16–4)	East Carolina (16–8)	Arizona (20–8)	Southeastern Louisiana (26–7)	Ole Miss (24–13)	Clemson (25–16)	Connecticut (35–9)	Auburn (33–15)	UC Irvine (32–17)	Oregon (37–19)	LSU (40–20)	Virginia Tech (40–22)	Virginia Tech (40–22)	23.
24.	San Diego	Ole Miss (2–1)	South Carolina (4–2)	Kentucky (9–1)	South Carolina (11–4)	Stanford (10–4)	UC Irvine (14–8)	Western Kentucky (22–7)	Kansas State (23–6)	Clemson (23–14)	Kansas State (27–10)	North Carolina (27–17)	Rice (30–17)	Arizona (31–17)	North Carolina (36–20)	San Diego (36–20)	Texas A&M (43–21–1)	Texas A&M (43–21–1)	24.
25.	Oklahoma	San Diego (3–1)	Vanderbilt (6–1)	Stanford (7–4)	East Carolina (8–6)	Texas A&M (15–4)	Western Kentucky (20–5)	Alabama (19–8)	Cal State Fullerton (18–12)	California (22–11)	North Carolina (25–17)	UC Irvine (27–14)	Arizona (30–16)	Oregon (34–18)	Ole Miss (36–20)	Ole Miss (38–22)	Oregon (40–24)	Oregon (40–24)	25.
26.	Georgia	Southern Miss (2–1)	Stanford (4–3)	Cal State Fullerton (4–6)	Texas A&M (13–3)	Kentucky (15–5)	Stanford (12–6)	College of Charleston (23–7)	East Carolina (20–12)	Western Kentucky (27–12)	Oregon (27–13)	Kansas State (30–12)	Stanford (25–18)	North Carolina (32–20)	San Diego (33–18)	North Carolina (36–20)	North Carolina (38–22)	North Carolina (38–22)	26.
27.	UCLA	UCLA (3–0)	Kentucky (6–0)	Alabama (8–1)	Kansas (11–4)	Southeastern Louisiana (18–2)	Texas A&M (17–6)	East Carolina (18–11)	California (20–10)	Connecticut (27–7)	Western Kentucky (30–14)	Rice (26–16)	UC Irvine (29–16)	LSU (34–18)	Stanford (30–21)	Texas A&M (40–19–1)	College of Charleston (44–19)	College of Charleston (44–19)	27.
28.	Texas A&M	Texas A&M (3–0)	Alabama (5–0)	South Carolina (6–4)	Stanford (7–4)	Arizona (16–4)	Kansas State (19–3)	Stanford (13–9)	UC Irvine (18–11)	Virginia Tech (25–13)	Rice (26–16)	Auburn (30–15)	Oregon (30–18)	Kansas State (34–16)	Arizona (32–20)	Oregon (38–22)	St. John's (43–20)	St. John's (43–20)	28.
29.	Vanderbilt	Kentucky (3–0)	Georgia (6–2)	Texas A&M (9–2)	Cal State Fullerton (7–7)	East Carolina (11–8)	Alabama (16–6)	Rice (17–12)	Virginia Tech (23–11)	North Carolina (22–16)	UC Irvine (24–13)	California (26–15)	Kansas State (32–15)	San Diego (31–17)	College of Charleston (41–15)	Alabama (37–22)	LSU (41–22)т	LSU (41–22)т	29.
30.	Stanford	Vanderbilt (3–0)	St. John's (6–0)	NC State (10–1)	Southeastern Louisiana (15–1)	Western Kentucky (16–5)	Kentucky (16–8)	Kansas State (21–5)	Kentucky (21–12)	Stanford (18–13)	Oregon State (21–13)	Stanford (21–17)	San Diego (30–16)	Stanford (27–20)	LSU (36–20)	The Citadel (42–20)	Ole Miss (39–24)т	Ole Miss (39–24)т	30.
	Preseason Feb 1	Week 1 Feb 22	Week 2 Mar 1	Week 3 Mar 8	Week 4 Mar 15	Week 5 Mar 22	Week 6 Mar 29	Week 7 Apr 5	Week 8 Apr 12	Week 9 Apr 19	Week 10 Apr 26	Week 11 May 3	Week 12 May 10	Week 13 May 17	Week 14 May 24	Week 15 May 31	Week 16 June 15	Week 17 June 29	
		Dropped: 26 Georgia	Dropped: 25 San Diego; 26 Southern Miss; 28 Texas A&M	Dropped: 29 Georgia; 30 St. John's	Dropped: 23 Ohio State; 30 NC State	Dropped: 27 Kansas; 29 Cal State Fullerton	Dropped: 22 Rice	Dropped: 27 Texas A&M; 30 Kentucky	Dropped: 25 Alabama; 26 College of Charleston; 28 Stanford; 29 Rice	Dropped: 28 UC Irvine; 30 Kentucky	Dropped: 20 Southeastern Louisiana; 21 East Carolina; 25 California	Dropped: 27 Western Kentucky; 30 Oregon State	Dropped: 29 California	None	Dropped: 28 Kansas State	Dropped: 27 Stanford; 28 Arizona; 29 College of Charleston	Dropped: 24 San Diego; 30 The Citadel	None	
