= Patriot Field =

Baseball field in Dallas, Texas, US

Coordinates: 32°42′42″N 96°56′43″W

- Interactive map of Patriot Field
- Location: 3000 Mountain Creek Parkway Dallas, TX
- Owner: Dallas Baptist Patriots
- Operator: Dallas Baptist Patriots
- Capacity: 700
- Surface: Tiff Bermuda
- Field size: Left Field - 330ft (100m); Center Field - 388ft (118m); Right Field - 330ft (100m)

Construction
- Opened: 1983

Tenant
- Dallas Baptist Patriots baseball (NCAA D1 WAC) (1983-2012)

Patriot Field is a baseball field located in Dallas, Texas, United States, and was home to the Dallas Baptist Patriots baseball team from 1983 to 2012. The venue was finished in the summer of 1983 and has had many improvements done through the years since its inception. The field has also made a cameo appearance in Chuck Norris' The President's Man, a made-for-TV movie, for CBS in 2001. The Texas Longhorns baseball team, featured in the film, used it as their fictitious "home field."

It was replaced at the start of the 2013 season by Horner Ballpark.
