= 2010 College Baseball All-America Team =

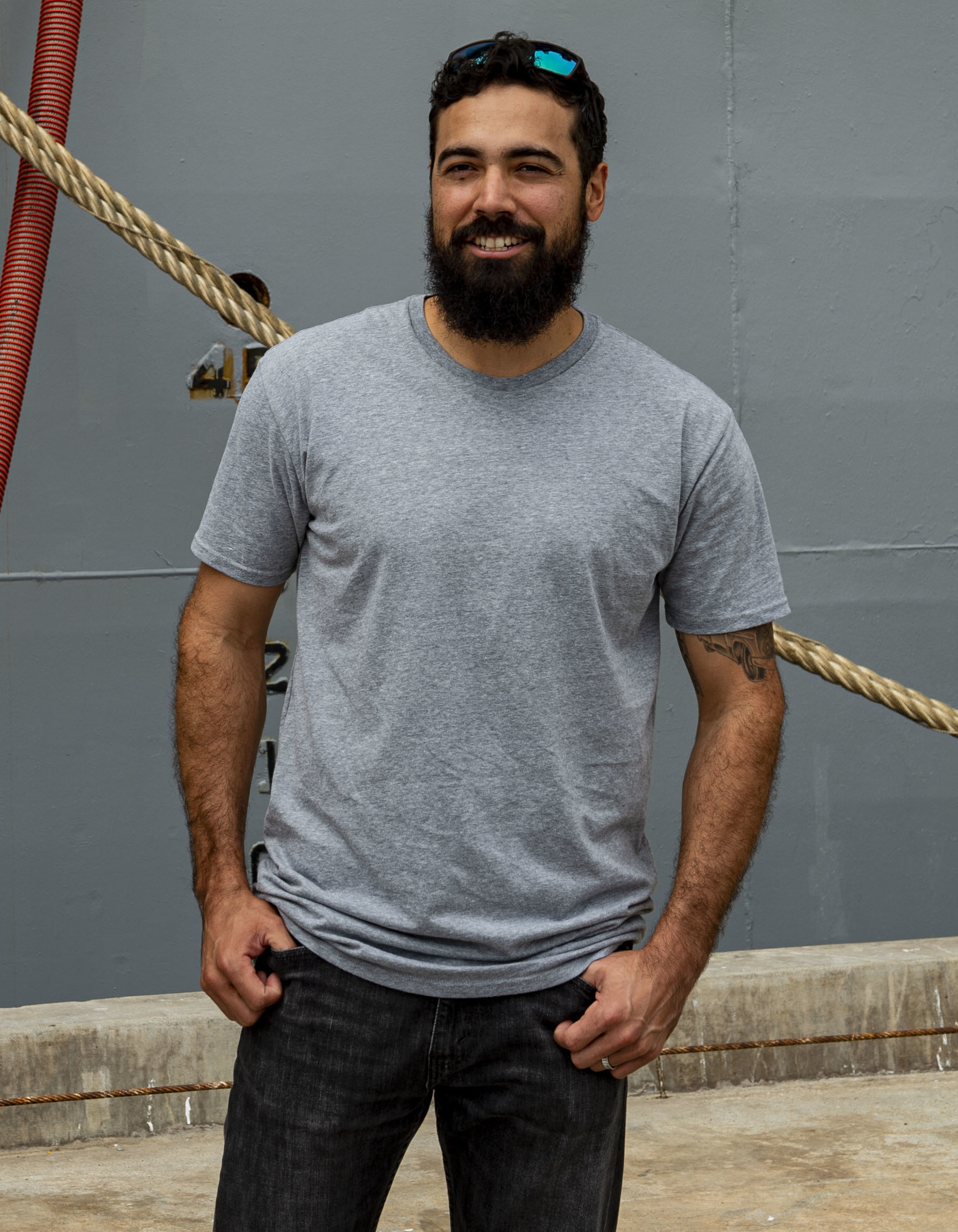
2010 All-Americans included Dick Howser Trophy winner Anthony Rendon.

This is a list of college baseball players named first team All-Americans for the 2010 NCAA Division I baseball season. From 2006 to 2010, there were five generally recognized All-America selectors for baseball: the American Baseball Coaches Association, Baseball America, Collegiate Baseball Newspaper, the National Collegiate Baseball Writers Association, and Yahoo Sports, who had acquired Rivals.com and took over the publication of the team. In order to be considered a "consensus" All-American, a player must have been selected by at least three of these.

== Key ==
A	American Baseball Coaches Association
B	Baseball America
C	Collegiate Baseball Newspaper
N	National Collegiate Baseball Writers Association
R	Yahoo Sports (formerly published by Rivals.com)
	Member of the National College Baseball Hall of Fame
	Consensus All-American – selected by all five organizations
	Consensus All-American – selected by three or four organizations

== All-Americans ==
Position	Name	School	#	A	B	C	N	R	Other awards and honors
Starting pitcher	Daniel Bibona	UC Irvine	1	—	—	✓	—	—	
Starting pitcher	Seth Blair	Arizona State	2	✓	✓	—	—	—	
Starting pitcher	Cole Green	Texas	2	—	—	✓	✓	—	
Starting pitcher	Danny Hultzen	Virginia	4	✓	—	✓	✓	✓	
Starting pitcher	Taylor Jungman	Texas	1	—	—	—	—	✓	
Starting pitcher	Barret Loux	Texas A&M	1	—	✓	—	—	—	
Starting pitcher	Anthony Meo	Coastal Carolina	1	—	—	—	✓	—	
Starting pitcher	Drew Pomeranz	Ole Miss	5	✓	✓	✓	✓	✓	
Starting pitcher	Matt Purke	TCU	1	✓	—	—	—	—	
Starting pitcher	Chris Sale	Florida Gulf Coast	5	✓	✓	✓	✓	✓	Collegiate Baseball Player of the Year
Starting pitcher	Alex Wimmers	Ohio State	1	—	—	✓	—	—	National Pitcher of the Year
Relief pitcher	Kevin Arico	Virginia	1	—	—	—	✓	—	
Relief pitcher	Neil Holland	Louisville	1	—	—	—	✓	—	
Relief pitcher	Chance Ruffin	Texas	5	✓	✓	✓	✓	✓	Stopper of the Year
Relief pitcher	John Stilson	Texas A&M	1	—	—	—	—	✓	
Catcher	Yasmani Grandal	Miami (FL)	5	✓	✓	✓	✓	✓	
First baseman	Paul Hoilman	East Tennessee State	1	—	—	✓	—	—	
First baseman	Hunter Morris	Auburn	4	✓	✓	—	✓	✓	
Second baseman	Zack MacPhee	Arizona State	5	✓	✓	✓	✓	✓	
Second baseman	Ryan Wright	Louisville	1	✓	—	—	—	—	
Shortstop	Christian Colon	Cal State Fullerton	3	✓	✓	—	—	✓	
Shortstop	Jedd Gyorko	West Virginia	1	—	—	—	✓	—	Brooks Wallace Award
Shortstop	Ryan Soares	George Mason	1	—	—	✓	—	—	
Third baseman	Anthony Rendon	Rice	4	✓	✓	—	✓	✓	Dick Howser Trophy ABCA Player of the Year Baseball America Player of the Year
Third baseman	Garrett Wittels	FIU	1	—	—	✓	—	—	
Outfielder	Jeremy Baltz	St. John's	1	—	✓	—	—	—	
Outfielder	Gary Brown	Cal State Fullerton	4	✓	—	✓	✓	✓	
Outfielder	Michael Choice	UT Arlington	2	—	✓	—	—	✓	
Outfielder	Alex Dickerson	Indiana	3	✓	—	✓	✓	—	
Outfielder / DH	Christopher Duffy	UCF	4	✓	✓	—	✓	✓	
Outfielder	Taylor Dugas	Alabama	1	—	✓	—	—	—	
Outfielder	Chad Oberacker	Tennessee Tech	1	—	—	✓	—	—	
Designated hitter	Zack Cox	Arkansas	1	—	—	—	—	✓	
Designated hitter	C. J. Cron	Utah	2	—	—	✓	✓	—	
Designated hitter	A. J. Kirby-Jones	Tennessee Tech	1	✓	—	—	—	—	
Utility player	Mike McGee	Florida State	2	—	✓	—	✓	—	John Olerud Award
Utility player	Nick Ramirez	Cal State Fullerton	1	—	—	—	—	✓	
Utility player	Kolbrin Vitek	Ball State	2	✓	—	✓	—	—	

== See also ==
- List of college baseball awards
