= 2010 Florida State Seminoles baseball team =

American college baseball season

2010 Florida State Seminoles baseball

ACC Atlantic Division champions NCAA Tallahassee Regional champions NCAA Tallahassee Super Regional champions

College World Series, 1–2
- Conference: Atlantic Coast Conference
- Record: 48–20 (18–12 ACC)
- Head coach: Mike Martin (31st year)
- Home stadium: Dick Howser Stadium

2010 Atlantic Coast Conference baseball standings
	Conf.				Overall
Team	W		L	PCT	W		L	PCT
Atlantic
No. 6 Florida State ^{x}‍‍‡‍^{y}	18	–	12	.600	48	–	20	.706
No. 4 Clemson ^{x}‍‍‍^{y}	18	–	12	.600	45	–	25	.643
NC State ‍‍‍^{y}	15	–	15	.500	38	–	24	.613
Boston College ‍‍‍	14	–	16	.467	30	–	28	.517
Wake Forest ‍‍‍	8	–	22	.267	18	–	37	.327
Maryland ‍‍‍	5	–	25	.167	17	–	39	.304
Coastal
No. 10 Virginia ^{x}‍‍‍^{y}	23	–	7	.767	51	–	14	.785
No. 17 Georgia Tech ‍‍‍^{y}	21	–	9	.700	41	–	15	.732
No. 13 Miami (FL) ‍‍‍^{y}	20	–	10	.667	43	–	20	.683
Virginia Tech ‍‍‍^{y}	16	–	14	.533	40	–	22	.645
North Carolina ‍‍‍^{y}	14	–	16	.467	38	–	22	.633
Duke ‍‍‍	8	–	22	.267	29	–	27	.518
x – Division champion ‡ – Tournament champion y – Invited to the NCAA tournament As of June 26, 2010; Rankings from Collegiate Baseball

The 2010 Florida State Seminoles baseball team represented Florida State University in the 2010 NCAA Division I baseball season. The Seminoles played their home games at Dick Howser Stadium, and played as part of the Atlantic Coast Conference. The team was coached by Mike Martin in his thirty-first season as head coach at Florida State.

The Seminoles reached the College World Series, their twentieth appearance in Omaha, where they finished tied for fifth place after recording a win against Florida and losing a pair of games to TCU.

== Personnel ==
=== Roster ===
2010 Florida State Seminoles roster
Pitchers: 3 - Sean Gilmartin - Sophomore; 6 - Corben Madden - Freshman; 13 - Robert Benincasa - Freshman; 11 - Anthony Howard - "Freshman"; 18 - Tyson Young - Freshman; 19 - Gage Smith - Freshman; 20 - Daniel Bennett - Junior; 21 - Geoff Parker - Junior; 22 - John Gast - Junior; 24 - Brian Busch - Sophomore; 25 - Mike McGee - Junior; 26 - Scott Sitz - Freshman; 27 - David Trexler - Freshman; 28 - Tyler Everett - Junior; 30 - Hunter Scantling - Sophomore; 35 - Ben Nobles - Junior; 36 - Robby Scott - Junior; 37 - Taiwan Easterling - (redshirt) Sophomore	Catchers: 7 - Parker Brunelle - Junior; 9 - Stephen McGee - Freshman; 29 - Raffy Lopez - (redshirt) Junior; Infielders: 1 - Stuart Tapley - Junior; 5 - Jack Posey - Junior; 8 - Devon Travis - Freshman; 10 - Justin Gonzalez - Freshman; 11 - Anthony Howard - "Freshman"; 16 - Jayce Boyd - Freshman; 31 - Kevin Jackson - Freshman; 32 - Sherman Johnson - Sophomore; 38 - Stephen Cardullo - Senior; 45 - Mike Meschke - Senior; 54 - Jacobbi McDaniel - Freshman	Outfielders: 2 - Ohmed Danesh - Senior; 14 - Tye Buckley - Junior; 15 - Tyler Holt - Junior; 17 - Robby Stahl - (redshirt) Junior; 23 - James Ramsey - Sophomore; 33 - Andrew Durden - Junior

=== Coaches ===
2010 Florida State Seminoles baseball coaching staff
- Mike Martin – Head coach – 31st year
- Jamey Shouppe - Associate head coach - 21st year
- Mike Martin Jr. - Assistant coach - 13th year
- Brian Hoop - Volunteer assistant coach - 2nd year

== Schedule and results ==
Legend
Florida State win
Florida State loss

2010 Florida State Seminoles baseball game log
Regular season

February
Date	Opponent	Rank	Site/stadium	Score	Overall record	ACC record
Feb 19	Georgia State*	No. 7	Dick Howser Stadium • Tallahassee, FL	W 11–3	1–0	
Feb 20	Georgia State*	No. 7	Dick Howser Stadium • Tallahassee, FL	W 14–7	2–0	
Feb 21	Georgia State*	No. 7	Dick Howser Stadium • Tallahassee, FL	W 12–2	3–0	
Feb 27	Hofstra*	No. 7	Dick Howser Stadium • Tallahassee, FL	W 13–1	4–0	
Feb 27	Hofstra*	No. 7	Dick Howser Stadium • Tallahassee, FL	W 13–0^{7}	5–0	
Feb 28	Hofstra*	No. 7	Dick Howser Stadium • Tallahassee, FL	W 14–4	6–0	

March
Date	Opponent	Rank	Site/stadium	Score	Overall record	ACC record
Mar 2	vs No. 7 Florida*	No. 6	George M. Steinbrenner Field • Tampa, FL	W 10–5	7–0	
Mar 5	Georgia*	No. 6	Dick Howser Stadium • Tallahassee, FL	W 12–1	8–0	
Mar 6	Georgia*	No. 6	Dick Howser Stadium • Tallahassee, FL	W 9–2	9–0	
Mar 7	Georgia*	No. 6	Dick Howser Stadium • Tallahassee, FL	W 17–5	10–0	
Mar 8	at Jacksonville*	No. 3	John Sessions Stadium • Jacksonville, FL	W 2–0	11–0	
Mar 10	North Florida*	No. 3	Dick Howser Stadium • Tallahassee, FL	W 6–2	12–0	
Mar 12	No. 4 Virginia	No. 3	Dick Howser Stadium • Tallahassee, FL	L 0–5	12–1	0–1
Mar 13	No. 4 Virginia	No. 3	Dick Howser Stadium • Tallahassee, FL	L 8–9	12–2	0–2
Mar 14	No. 4 Virginia	No. 3	Dick Howser Stadium • Tallahassee, FL	W 9–8	13–2	1–2
Mar 16	at Florida*	No. 5	Alfred A. McKethan Stadium • Gainesville, FL	L 5–8	13–3	
Mar 19	at No. 22 North Carolina	No. 5	Boshamer Stadium • Chapel Hill, NC	W 4–3	14–3	2–2
Mar 20	at No. 22 North Carolina	No. 5	Boshamer Stadium • Chapel Hill, NC	L 4–10	14–4	2–3
Mar 21	at No. 22 North Carolina	No. 5	Boshamer Stadium • Chapel Hill, NC	W 5–3	15–4	3–3
Mar 24	Stetson*	No. 7	Dick Howser Stadium • Tallahassee, FL	W 14–7	16–4	
Mar 26	Maryland	No. 7	Dick Howser Stadium • Tallahassee, FL	W 4–1	17–4	4–3
Mar 27	Maryland	No. 7	Dick Howser Stadium • Tallahassee, FL	W 12–5	18–4	5–3
Mar 28	Maryland	No. 7	Dick Howser Stadium • Tallahassee, FL	W 9–5	19–4	6–3
Mar 30	vs No. 12 Florida*	No. 6	Baseball Grounds of Jacksonville • Jacksonville, FL	W 7–2	20–4	

April
Date	Opponent	Rank	Site/stadium	Score	Overall record	ACC record
Apr 2	Virginia Tech	No. 6	Dick Howser Stadium • Tallahassee, FL	L 5–10	20–5	6–4
Apr 3	Virginia Tech	No. 6	Dick Howser Stadium • Tallahassee, FL	L 7–8	20–6	6–5
Apr 4	Virginia Tech	No. 6	Dick Howser Stadium • Tallahassee, FL	W 9–6	21–6	7–5
Apr 6	at North Florida*	No. 11	Harmon Stadium • Jacksonville, FL	L 1–3	21–7	
Apr 7	North Florida*	No. 11	Dick Howser Stadium • Tallahassee, FL	W 9–2	22–7	
Apr 9	at Wake Forest	No. 11	Gene Hooks Stadium • Winston-Salem, NC	W 10–1	23–7	8–5
Apr 10	at Wake Forest	No. 11	Gene Hooks Stadium • Winston-Salem, NC	W 5–4	24–7	9–5
Apr 11	at Wake Forest	No. 11	Gene Hooks Stadium • Winston-Salem, NC	W 17–16	25–7	10–5
Apr 13	No. 12 Florida*	No. 10	Dick Howser Stadium • Tallahassee, FL	W 3–2	26–7	
Apr 14	Jacksonville*	No. 10	Dick Howser Stadium • Tallahassee, FL	L 8–10	26–8	
Apr 16	at Duke	No. 10	USA Baseball National Training Complex • Cary, NC	W 16–3	27–8	11–5
Apr 17	at Duke	No. 10	USA Baseball National Training Complex • Cary, NC	L 6–10	27–9	11–6
Apr 18	at Duke	No. 10	USA Baseball National Training Complex • Cary, NC	W 8–3	28–9	12–6
Apr 21	Charleston Southern*	No. 11	Dick Howser Stadium • Tallahassee, FL	W 12–4	29–9	
Apr 23	No. 9 Miami (FL)*	No. 11	Dick Howser Stadium • Tallahassee, FL	L 5–6	29–10	12–7
Apr 24	No. 9 Miami (FL)*	No. 11	Dick Howser Stadium • Tallahassee, FL	W 8–7	30–10	13–7
Apr 25	No. 9 Miami (FL)*	No. 11	Dick Howser Stadium • Tallahassee, FL	W 7–6	31–10	14–7

May
Date	Opponent	Rank	Site/stadium	Score	Overall record	ACC record
May 1	Le Moyne*	No. 10	Dick Howser Stadium • Tallahassee, FL	L 1–3	31–11	
May 1	Le Moyne*	No. 10	Dick Howser Stadium • Tallahassee, FL	W 8–5	32–11	
May 2	Le Moyne*	No. 10	Dick Howser Stadium • Tallahassee, FL	W 17–1	33–11	
May 4	Jacksonville*	No. 8	Dick Howser Stadium • Tallahassee, FL	W 11–10^{13}	34–11	
May 7	at Boston College	No. 8	Eddie Pellagrini Diamond • Chestnut Hill, MA	L 7–10	34–12	14–8
May 9	at Boston College	No. 8	Eddie Pellagrini Diamond • Chestnut Hill, MA	W 6–4	35–12	15–8
May 9	at Boston College	No. 8	Eddie Pellagrini Diamond • Chestnut Hill, MA	W 11–6	36–12	16–8
May 12	at Stetson*	No. 10	Melching Field at Conrad Park • DeLand, FL	W 6–2	37–12	
May 14	NC State	No. 10	Dick Howser Stadium • Tallahassee, FL	L 2–5	37–13	16–9
May 15	NC State	No. 10	Dick Howser Stadium • Tallahassee, FL	W 7–5	38–13	17–9
May 16	NC State	No. 10	Dick Howser Stadium • Tallahassee, FL	W 12–9^{7}	39–13	18–9
May 20	at No. 28 Clemson	No. 11	Doug Kingsmore Stadium • Clemson, SC	L 8–9	39–14	18–10
May 21	at No. 28 Clemson	No. 11	Doug Kingsmore Stadium • Clemson, SC	L 4–8	39–15	18–11
May 22	at No. 28 Clemson	No. 11	Doug Kingsmore Stadium • Clemson, SC	L 3–8	39–16	18–12

Postseason

ACC Tournament
Date	Opponent	Rank	Site/stadium	Score	Overall record	ACCT Record
May 26	No. 10 (4) Miami (FL)	No. 17 (5)	NewBridge Bank Park • Greensboro, NC	L 3–9	39–17	0–1
May 27	No. 2 (1) Virginia	No. 17 (5)	NewBridge Bank Park • Greensboro, NC	W 11–4	40–17	1–1
May 28	(8) Boston College	No. 17 (5)	NewBridge Bank Park • Greensboro, NC	W 12–2	41–17	2–1
May 30	(7) NC State	No. 17 (5)	NewBridge Bank Park • Greensboro, NC	W 8–3	42–17	3–1

NCAA Norwich Regional
Date	Opponent	Rank	Site/stadium	Score	Overall record	Reg Record
June 4	(4) Central Connecticut	No. 15 (1)	Senator Thomas J. Dodd Memorial Stadium • Norwich, CT	W 11–3	43–17	1–0
June 5	(3) Oregon	No. 15 (1)	Senator Thomas J. Dodd Memorial Stadium • Norwich, CT	W 6–4	44–17	2–0
June 6	(3) Oregon	No. 15 (1)	Senator Thomas J. Dodd Memorial Stadium • Norwich, CT	W 5–3	45–17	3–0

NCAA Tallahassee Super Regional
Date	Opponent	Rank	Site/stadium	Score	Overall record	SR Record
June 11	No. 14 Vanderbilt	No. 12	Dick Howser Stadium • Tallahassee, FL	W 9–8	46–17	1–0
June 12	No. 14 Vanderbilt	No. 12	Dick Howser Stadium • Tallahassee, FL	L 2–6	46–18	1–1
June 13	No. 14 Vanderbilt	No. 12	Dick Howser Stadium • Tallahassee, FL	W 7–6	47–18	2–1

College World Series
Date	Opponent	Rank	Site/stadium	Score	Overall record	CWS record
June 19	No. 4 TCU	No. 7	Johnny Rosenblatt Stadium • Omaha, NE	L 1–8	47–19	0–1
June 21	No. 3 (3) Florida	No. 7	Johnny Rosenblatt Stadium • Omaha, NE	W 8–5	48–19	1–1
June 23	No. 4 TCU	No. 7	Johnny Rosenblatt Stadium • Omaha, NE	L 7–11	48–20	1–2

== Ranking movements ==
Ranking movements Legend: ██ Increase in ranking ██ Decrease in ranking
	Week																		
Poll	Pre	1	2	3	4	5	6	7	8	9	10	11	12	13	14	15	16	17	Final
Coaches' Poll	5	5*	3	2	5	7	6	8	7	9	10	9	8	8	14	12	12*	12*	6
Baseball America	9	7	6	5	5	6	4	7	6	6	4	5	5	7	14	10	10*	10*	6
Collegiate Baseball	7	7	6	3	5	7	6	11	10	11	10	8	10	11	17	15	12	7	6
NCBWA	6	2	3	2	4	6	5	8	8	10	8	8	8	8	13	12	12*	7	6
