= 2010 Clemson Tigers baseball team =

American college baseball season

2010 Clemson Tigers baseball

ACC Atlantic Division Champions Auburn, Alabama Regional Champions Clemson, South Carolina Super Regional Champions
- Conference: Atlantic Coast Conference
- Atlantic
- Record: 45–25 (18–12 ACC)
- Head coach: Jack Leggett
- Home stadium: Doug Kingsmore Stadium

2010 Atlantic Coast Conference baseball standings
	Conf.				Overall
Team	W		L	PCT	W		L	PCT
Atlantic
No. 6 Florida State ^{x}‍‍‡‍^{y}	18	–	12	.600	48	–	20	.706
No. 4 Clemson ^{x}‍‍‍^{y}	18	–	12	.600	45	–	25	.643
NC State ‍‍‍^{y}	15	–	15	.500	38	–	24	.613
Boston College ‍‍‍	14	–	16	.467	30	–	28	.517
Wake Forest ‍‍‍	8	–	22	.267	18	–	37	.327
Maryland ‍‍‍	5	–	25	.167	17	–	39	.304
Coastal
No. 10 Virginia ^{x}‍‍‍^{y}	23	–	7	.767	51	–	14	.785
No. 17 Georgia Tech ‍‍‍^{y}	21	–	9	.700	41	–	15	.732
No. 13 Miami (FL) ‍‍‍^{y}	20	–	10	.667	43	–	20	.683
Virginia Tech ‍‍‍^{y}	16	–	14	.533	40	–	22	.645
North Carolina ‍‍‍^{y}	14	–	16	.467	38	–	22	.633
Duke ‍‍‍	8	–	22	.267	29	–	27	.518
x – Division champion ‡ – Tournament champion y – Invited to the NCAA tournament As of June 26, 2010; Rankings from Collegiate Baseball

The 2010 Clemson Tigers baseball team represented Clemson University in the 2010 NCAA Division I baseball season. The team played their home games at Doug Kingsmore Stadium in Clemson, South Carolina.

The team was coached by Jack Leggett, who completed his seventeenth season at Clemson.

== Preseason ==
On January 28, 2010, the coaches in the ACC picked Clemson to finish second in the Atlantic Division behind Florida State. Overall, the Tigers were picked third behind defending ACC champion Virginia and Florida State, respectively.

== Regular season ==
Clemson played Wright State and Dayton for the first time ever on the baseball diamond. The Tigers went 4–0 against the Dayton, Ohio schools, sweeping Wright State in a three-game series before winning a mid-week contest against Dayton in 10 innings.

Clemson won its annual series against archrival South Carolina for the first time since 2006 by taking two of three games against the Gamecocks. OF/DH Chris Epps won the Bob Bradley Award as the Tigers' MVP of the series, going 7-for-14 with two home runs, a double, six RBIs, six runs, two walks, and one steal. The March 6 contest at Fluor Field was the first game between both schools at that stadium and the 1st game played in Greenville since the 1990 season.

On April 21, 3B John Hinson tied a school record by hitting three home runs in a game during the Tigers' 22–4 victory over USC-Upstate.

Clemson played its first four-game weekend series since 1996 when they hosted Florida Gulf Coast, the first meeting between the schools. After dropping the first game in the series, the Tigers took the final three games from the Eagles.

On May 22, Clemson completed a three-game sweep of eventual ACC champion Florida State to win their second ACC Atlantic Division title. Both teams finished with an 18–12 conference record, but the Tigers won the tiebreaker due to winning the head-to-head matchup with the Seminoles.

Clemson played nine schools that made it to the 2010 NCAA tournament: (Coastal Carolina, Elon, Florida State, Georgia Tech, North Carolina State, North Carolina, South Carolina, Virginia, Virginia Tech). The Tigers compiled a 14–13 record against these 9 schools. Outside of conference play, Clemson played 4 schools that had won a conference regular season or tournament championship (Charlotte, Coastal Carolina, Florida Gulf Coast, Wright State). The Tigers compiled a 6–3 record against these four schools.

== Postseason ==
=== ACC tournament ===
Clemson entered the ACC Tournament as the #2 seed by virtue of winning the ACC Atlantic Division (Virginia claimed the #1 seed by virtue of winning both the Coastal Division and the ACC regular season). The Tigers competed in the Pool B of round robin play, which included #3 seed Georgia Tech, #6 seed Virginia Tech, and #7 seed N.C. State. The Tigers dropped their first two games against the Wolfpack and Hokies (both were teams that the Tigers swept in the regular season) before winning their final game against the Yellow Jackets (who swept the Tigers during the regular season) to finish the tournament with a 1–2 record. Florida State, whom the Tigers swept to win the Atlantic Division crown, defeated N.C. State in the championship game to win the ACC Championship.

With their victory over Georgia Tech, Clemson became the first team to win 100 games in ACC Tournament history.

=== NCAA tournament ===
Clemson was awarded the #2 seed in the Auburn Regional of the 2010 NCAA tournament. On June 4, the Tigers opened regional play with #3 seed and Conference USA champion Southern Miss. The Tigers totaled 12 hits and used 6 runs in the sixth inning to top the Golden Eagles, 10–1. On June 5, Clemson faced #1 seed and host Auburn in a match-up of conference division champions (Clemson having won the ACC Atlantic title, while Auburn won the SEC West title). The ACC Tigers prevailed over the SEC Tigers, 5–2, behind a complete game performance by pitcher Casey Harman. The following night, however, Auburn won 11–10, using a three-run home run by Creede Simpson in the 9th inning to rally past Clemson and force a deciding championship game. On June 7, Clemson prevailed, using clutch hitting and timely plays on defense to defeat Auburn, 13–7, and win the Auburn Regional Championship. In the 1st inning of the championship game, two-sport standout Kyle Parker hit his 20th home run of the season, becoming the 1st Division I athlete to throw 20 touchdown passes in football and hit 20 home runs in baseball in the same academic year.

Clemson was named one of the eight schools to host a Super Regional, as the Tigers were paired up against Atlanta Regional champions, Alabama. The Crismon Tide knocked off #8 national seed (and Tiger ACC rival) Georgia Tech, which gave the Tigers the opportunity to receive its 1st super regional bid since 2006. In the 1st game of the super regional, the Crimson Tide used two errors in the 3rd inning to score 4 runs and jump out to a 5–0 lead, then held on to claim a 5–4 victory over the Tigers. In the 2nd super regional game, however, the Tigers jumped out to a 6–0 lead and never looked back, tallying 20 hits and 9 walks against Alabama's pitching staff in a 19–5 victory to force a deciding game 3 for a CWS berth. In game three, Clemson erased an early 1–0 deficit to take an 8–1 lead into the ninth inning and held of an Alabama rally to win 8–6 and earn a College World Series bid, the Tigers' eleventh overall and first since 2006.

=== College World Series ===
By virtue of the Super Regional win against Alabama, Clemson joined Arizona State, Florida, Florida State, Oklahoma, South Carolina, TCU, and UCLA in the 2010 College World Series. Clemson was the only team to advance to the CWS that was ranked lower than a #1 seed during regional play. On June 21, the Tigers defeated #1 national seed Arizona State, 6–3, in a game that was delayed to a 10:00 A.M. (CST) start time due to rain and lightning the previous evening. The Tigers used strong pitching performances by Casey Harman and Alex Frederick, along with great play on defense, to hold the Sun Devils to only three runs. Offensively, the Tigers took advantage of a poor outing by ASU starting pitcher Scott Blair and several defensive miscues en route to scoring 6 runs and totaling 14 hits. On June 22, the Tigers played the Oklahoma Sooners. They secured a 6–1 lead after 5 innings against the Sooners before play was stopped at 10:08 P.M. (CST) due to inclement weather. The game was resumed the following afternoon, with Clemson holding off a late Sooner rally to win 6–4. Clemson then went on to face in state rival South Carolina, dropping the next two games to the Gamecocks 5–1 and 6–4 to be eliminated from the tournament. South Carolina ultimately went on to win the tournament by beating UCLA twice in the finals.

== Honors and awards ==
All-ACC 1st Team

- Kyle Parker (OF)

All-ACC 2nd Team

- Mike Freeman (2B)
- Jeff Schaus (OF)

Auburn Regional All-Tournament Team

- Wilson Boyd (OF)
- Mike Freeman (2B)
- Casey Harman (P)
- John Hinson (3B) – MVP
- Jeff Schaus (OF)
- Scott Weisman (P)

== Coaching staff ==
Name	Title	First season at CU	Alma mater
Jack Leggett	Head Coach	1994	Maine (1976)
Tom Riginos	Associate head coach	2003	Stetson (1990)
Dan Pepicelli	Assistant Head Coach	2010	SUNY Cortland (1990)
Michael Johnson	Volunteer Assistant Coach	2009	Clemson (2008)

== Schedule/Results ==
2010 Clemson Tigers baseball Game Log
Regular season

Date	Opponent^{#}	Rank^{#}	Location	Win	Loss	Save	Attend	Result	Record (ACC)
February 19*	Miami, Ohio,	#15	Doug Kingsmore Stadium • Clemson, South Carolina,	Harman (1–0)	Melling (0–1)		5,915	W 11–0	1–0
February 20*	vs. Michigan State	#15	Fluor Field at the West End • Greenville, South Carolina,	Weismann (1–0)	Bucciferro (0–1)		3,563	W 10–2	2–0
February 21*	Furman	#15	Doug Kingsmore Stadium • Clemson, South Carolina	Brady (1–0)	Benton (0–1)	Meyer (1)	5,539	W 8–5	3–0
February 26*	Wright State	#15	Doug Kingsmore Stadium • Clemson, South Carolina	Harman (2–0)	Kaminsky (0–1)	Frederick (1)	3,884	W 4–3	4–0
February 27*	Wright State	#15	Doug Kingsmore Stadium • Clemson, South Carolina	Haselden (1–0)	Schum (0–1)		4,690	W 8–6	5–0
February 28*	Wright State	#15	Doug Kingsmore Stadium • Clemson, South Carolina	Lamb (1–0)	Friedman (0–1)		4,027	W 12–6	6–0
March 3*	Dayton	#9	Doug Kingsmore Stadium • Clemson, South Carolina	Cruz (1–0)	Mitchem (0–3)		3,268	W 6–5^{10}	7–0
March 5*	#23 South Carolina	#9	Doug Kingsmore Stadium • Clemson, South Carolina (Clemson–South Carolina rivalry)	Haselden (2–0)	Roth (0–1)		6,346	W 4–3	8–0
March 6*	vs. #23 South Carolina	#9	Fluor Field at the West End • Greenville, South Carolina (Clemson–South Carolina rivalry)	Price (1–0)	Cruz (1–1)	Roth (1)	7,105	L 5–7	8–1
March 7*	@ #23 South Carolina	#9	Carolina Stadium • Columbia, South Carolina (Clemson–South Carolina rivalry)	Weismann (2–0)	Webb (0–1)		8,214	W 19–6	9–1
March 10*	Gardner–Webb	#7	Doug Kingsmore Stadium • Clemson, South Carolina	Sarratt (1–0)	Scarborough (0–2)		3,111	W 13–2	10–1
March 13	NC State	#7	Doug Kingsmore Stadium • Clemson, South Carolina	Harman (3–0)	Mazzoni (2–1)		4,895	W 12–7	11–1 (1–0)
March 13	NC State	#7	Doug Kingsmore Stadium • Clemson, South Carolina	Leone (1–0)	Tzamtzis (1–1)		4,895	W 12–6	12–1 (2–0)
March 14	NC State	#7	Doug Kingsmore Stadium • Clemson, South Carolina	Meyer (1–0)	Sasser (2–1)		3,663	W 7–6	13–1 (3–0)
March 16*	@ Charlotte	#7	Hayes Stadium • Charlotte, North Carolina,	Lawson (1–0)	Cruz (1–2)		1,832	L 10–11	13–2
March 17*	Georgia Southern	#7	Doug Kingsmore Stadium • Clemson, South Carolina	Kent (1–0)	Beck (0–3)		3,409	W 22–6	14–2
March 19	Virginia Tech	#7	Doug Kingsmore Stadium • Clemson, South Carolina	Harman (4–0)	Wright (2–3)	Haselden (1)	3,862	W 3–0	15–2 (4–0)
March 20	Virginia Tech	#7	Doug Kingsmore Stadium • Clemson, South Carolina	Lamb (2–0)	Hahn (4–1)	Frederick (2)	5,580	W 5–2	16–2 (5–0)
March 20	Virginia Tech	#7	Doug Kingsmore Stadium • Clemson, South Carolina	Weisman (3–0)	Mantiply	Meyer (2)	5,580	W 13–8	17–2 (6–0)
March 23*	Elon	#5	Doug Kingsmore Stadium • Clemson, South Carolina	Ferrer (2–1)	Firth (0–1)		3,496	L 10–15	17–3
March 24*	Elon	#5	Doug Kingsmore Stadium • Clemson, South Carolina	Girdwood (2–0)	Meyer (1–1)		3,851	L3–4^{10}	17–4
March 26	@ #2 Virginia	#5	Davenport Field • Charlottesville, Virginia,	Wilson (3–1)	Haselden (2–1)		2,305	L 3–4	17–5 (6–1)
March 27	@ #2 Virginia	#5	Davenport Field • Charlottesville, Virginia	Lamb (3–0)	Mayberry (0–1)	Haselden (2)	3,540	W 8–5	18–5 (7–1)
March 27	@ #2 Virginia	#5	Davenport Field • Charlottesville, Virginia	Winiarski (3–0)	Weisman (3–1)	Arico (8)	3,012	L 1–3	18–6 (7–2)
March 31*	#15 Coastal Carolina	#10	Doug Kingsmore Stadium • Clemson, South Carolina	Fleet (3–1)	Haselden (2–2)		5,609	L 3–4^{11}	18–7
April 2	Boston College	#10	Doug Kingsmore Stadium • Clemson, South Carolina	Harman (5–0)	Dennhardt (1–5)	Cruz (1)	6,064	W 15–2	19–7 (8–2)
April 3	Boston College	#10	Doug Kingsmore Stadium • Clemson, South Carolina	Dean (5–0)	Lamb (3–1)		5,587	L 5–11	19–8 (8–3)
April 4	Boston College	#10	Doug Kingsmore Stadium • Clemson, South Carolina	Haselden (3–2)	Moran (2–4)		3,925	W 14–9	20–8 (9–3)
April 6*	@ Georgia	#11	Foley Field • Athens, Georgia,	Leone (2–0)	Swegman (0–2)		3,783	W 15–5	21–8
April 7*	Georgia	#11	Doug Kingsmore Stadium • Clemson, South Carolina	Meyer (2–1)	Hawkins (0–2)		6,346	W 14–6	22–8
April 9	@ Duke	#11	Jack Coombs Field • Durham, North Carolina,	Knott (2–0)	Frederick (0–1)	Stroman (3)	788	L 9–10	22–9 (9–4)
April 10	@ Duke	#11	Jack Coombs Field • Durham, North Carolina	Cruz (2–2)	Knott (2–1)		1,418	W 11–5^{11}	23–9 (10–4)
April 11	@ Duke	#11	Jack Coombs Field • Durham, North Carolina	Bebout (4–0)	Lamb (3–2)		819	L 2–7	23–10 (10–5)
April 14*	Western Carolina	#16	Doug Kingsmore Stadium • Clemson, South Carolina	Chilcoat (1–0)	Kent (1–1)	Ottone (7)	3,990	L 5–7	23–11
April 16	@ #5 Georgia Tech	#16	Russ Chandler Stadium • Atlanta	Robinson (4–0)	Haselden (3–3)		2,448	L 6–8^{10}	23–12 (10–6)
April 17	@ #5 Georgia Tech	#16	Russ Chandler Stadium • Atlanta, Georgia	Cumpton (6–0)	Weisman (3–2)	Robinson (3)	2,491	L 3–4	23–13 (10–7)
April 18	@ #5 Georgia Tech	#16	Russ Chandler Stadium • Atlanta, Georgia	Bailey (5–2)	Lamb (3–3)		2,687	L 3–11	23–14 (10–8)
April 21*	USC-Upstate	#20	Doug Kingsmore Stadium • Clemson, South Carolina	Haselden (4–3)	Brannon (2–7)		3,752	W 22–4	24–14
April 23	North Carolina	#20	Doug Kingsmore Stadium • Clemson, South Carolina	Harvey (5–2)	Harman (5–1)		5,391	L 3–5	24–15 (10–9)
April 24	North Carolina	#20	Doug Kingsmore Stadium • Clemson, South Carolina	Frederick (1–1)	Morin (5–2)	Lamb (1)	5,118	W 10–6	25–15 (11–9)
April 25	North Carolina	#20	Doug Kingsmore Stadium • Clemson, South Carolina	Johnson (4–3)	Lamb (3–4)	Holt (3)	4,777	L 3–4	25–16 (11–10)
May 1*	Florida Gulf Coast	#25	Doug Kingsmore Stadium • Clemson, South Carolina	Sale (7–0)	Haselden (4–4)	Wagoner (8)	4,017	L 2–4	25–17
May 2*	Florida Gulf Coast	#25	Doug Kingsmore Stadium • Clemson, South Carolina	Weisman (4–2)	Erath (5–2)	Cruz (2)	4,745	W 9–3	26–17
May 2*	Florida Gulf Coast	#25	Doug Kingsmore Stadium • Clemson, South Carolina	Frederick (2–1)	Barners (2–2)		4,745	W 7–6	27–17
May 4*	Florida Gulf Coast	#24	Doug Kingsmore Stadium • Clemson, South Carolina	Frederick (3–1)	Nathanson (4–3)		4,056	W 14–2	28–17
May 7	@ Maryland	#24	Shipley Field • College Park, Maryland	Harman (6–1)	B. Harman (4–8)		541	W 18–6	29–17 (12–10)
May 8	@ Maryland	#24	Shipley Field • College Park, Maryland	Frederick (4–1)	Dischert (0–1)		908	W 12–8	30–17 (13–10)
May 9	@ Maryland	#24	Shipley Field • College Park, Maryland	Cruz (3–2)	Kolarek (1–3)		517	W 7–5	31–17 (14–10)
May 11*	vs. Furman	#22	Fluor Field at the West End • Greenville, South Carolina	Firth (1–1)	Benton (0–5)		3,417	W 12–1	32–17
May 14	@ Wake Forest	#22	Gene Hooks Field • Winston-Salem, North Carolina,	Stadler (3–3)	Harman (6–2)		803	L 5–9	32–18 (14–11)
May 15	@ Wake Forest	#22	Gene Hooks Field • Winston-Salem, North Carolina	Weisman (5–2)	Dimock (2–9)		679	W 17–5	33–18 (15–11)
May 16	@ Wake Forest	#22	Gene Hooks Field • Winston-Salem, North Carolina	Cooney (4–6)	Leone (2–1)		802	L 2–11	33–19 (15–12)
May 18*	Presbyterian	#22	Doug Kingsmore Stadium • Clemson, South Carolina	Firth (2–1)	Harmon (2–8)		3,968	W 8–2	34–19
May 20	#8 Florida State	#22	Doug Kingsmore Stadium • Clemson, South Carolina	Frederick (5–1)	Parker (3–1)	Cruz (3)	4,181	W 9–8	35–19 (16–12)
May 21	#8 Florida State	#22	Doug Kingsmore Stadium • Clemson, South Carolina	Weisman (6–2)	Busch (4–1)		4,495	W 8–4	36–19 (17–12)
May 22	#8 Florida State	#22	Doug Kingsmore Stadium • Clemson, South Carolina	Frederick (6–1)	Gast (6–3)		5,108	W 8–3	37–19 (18–12)
*Non-Conference Game. ^{#}Rankings from ESPN/USA Today Coaches Poll.^{1}Note that rankings above 25 are not official rankings. They are representations of ranking based on the number of points received in the weekly poll.

2010 ACC Baseball Tournament

Date	Opponent^{#}	Seed	Location	Win	Loss	Save	Attend	Result	Record (ACC)
May 26	vs. #7 N.C. State	#2	NewBridge Bank Park • Greensboro, North Carolina,	Sogard (2–2)	Frederick (6–2)		4,893	L 8–13	37–20 (0–1)
May 28	vs. #6 Virginia Tech	#2	NewBridge Bank Park • Greensboro, North Carolina	Rowen (5–1)	Kyle (0–1)		3,419	L 8–9	37–21 (0–2)
May 29	vs. #3 Georgia Tech	#2	NewBridge Bank Park • Greensboro, North Carolina	Lamb (4–4)	Bradley (9–4)		3,725	W 9–3	38–21 (1–2)
^{#}Rankings indicate tournament seeds

2010 NCAA Division I baseball tournament – Auburn, Alabama Regional

Date	Opponent^{#}	Seed	Location	Win	Loss	Save	Attend	Result	Record (NCAA)
June 4	#3 Southern Miss	#2	Plainsman Park • Auburn, Alabama	Weisman (7–2)	Copeland (11–1)		2,875	W 10–1	39–21 (1–0)
June 5	#1 Auburn	#2	Plainsman Park • Auburn, Alabama	Harman (7–2)	Dayton (8–3)		4,096	W 5–2	40–21 (2–0)
June 6	#1 Auburn	#2	Plainsman Park • Auburn, Alabama	Hubbard (6–2)	Cruz (3–3)		3,326	L 10–11	40–22 (2–1)
June 7	#1 Auburn	#2	Plainsman Park • Auburn, Alabama	Frederick (7–2)	Jacobs (0–2)	Brady (1)	4,096	W 13–7	41–22 (3–1)
^{#}Rankings indicate regional seeds

2010 NCAA Division I baseball tournament – Clemson, South Carolina Super Regional

Date	Opponent^{#}	Seed	Location	Win	Loss	Save	Attend	Result	Record (NCAA)
June 12	Alabama		Doug Kingsmore Stadium • Clemson, South Carolina	Nelson (9–3)	Harman (7–3)	Smith (6)	6,346	L 4–5	41–23 (3–2)
June 13	Alabama		Doug Kingsmore Stadium • Clemson, South Carolina	Weisman (8–2)	Morgan (7–5)		6,024	W 19–5	42–23 (4–2)
June 14	Alabama		Doug Kingsmore Stadium • Clemson, South Carolina	Leone (3–1)	Kilcrease (8–3)	Lamb (2)	5,250	W 8–6	43–23 (5–2)
^{#}Rankings indicate national seeds

2010 College World Series

Date	Opponent^{#}	Seed	Location	Win	Loss	Save	Attend	Result	Record (NCAA)
June 21	#1 Arizona State		Rosenblatt Stadium • Omaha, Nebraska	Harman (8–3)	Blair (12–1)	Frederick (3)	14,198	W 6–3	44–23 (6–2)
June 22	Oklahoma		Rosenblatt Stadium • Omaha, Nebraska	Weisman (9–2)	Shore (10–5)	Frederick (4)	21,527	W 6–4	45–23 (7–2)
June 25	South Carolina		Rosenblatt Stadium • Omaha, Nebraska	Roth (2–1)	Leone (3–2)		22,334	L 1–5	45–24 (7–3)
June 26	South Carolina		Rosenblatt Stadium • Omaha, Nebraska						45–25 (7–4)
^{#}Rankings indicate national seeds
