= 2010 Virginia Cavaliers baseball team =

American college baseball season

2010 Virginia Cavaliers baseball

2010 Atlantic Coast ACC Coastal Division Champions Charlottesville Regional champions
- Conference: Atlantic Coast Conference
- Record: 51–14 (23–7 ACC)
- Head coach: Brian O'Connor (7th season)
- Assistant coaches: Kevin McMullan (7th season); Karl Kuhn (7th season)
- Home stadium: Davenport Field

2010 Atlantic Coast Conference baseball standings
	Conf.				Overall
Team	W		L	PCT	W		L	PCT
Atlantic
No. 6 Florida State ^{x}‍‍‡‍^{y}	18	–	12	.600	48	–	20	.706
No. 4 Clemson ^{x}‍‍‍^{y}	18	–	12	.600	45	–	25	.643
NC State ‍‍‍^{y}	15	–	15	.500	38	–	24	.613
Boston College ‍‍‍	14	–	16	.467	30	–	28	.517
Wake Forest ‍‍‍	8	–	22	.267	18	–	37	.327
Maryland ‍‍‍	5	–	25	.167	17	–	39	.304
Coastal
No. 10 Virginia ^{x}‍‍‍^{y}	23	–	7	.767	51	–	14	.785
No. 17 Georgia Tech ‍‍‍^{y}	21	–	9	.700	41	–	15	.732
No. 13 Miami (FL) ‍‍‍^{y}	20	–	10	.667	43	–	20	.683
Virginia Tech ‍‍‍^{y}	16	–	14	.533	40	–	22	.645
North Carolina ‍‍‍^{y}	14	–	16	.467	38	–	22	.633
Duke ‍‍‍	8	–	22	.267	29	–	27	.518
x – Division champion ‡ – Tournament champion y – Invited to the NCAA tournament As of June 26, 2010; Rankings from Collegiate Baseball

2010 Virginia Cavaliers baseball team represented the University of Virginia in the 2010 NCAA Division I baseball season. The Cavaliers played their home games at Davenport Field. The team was coached by Brian O'Connor, leading his seventh season at Virginia.

The Cavaliers won the Atlantic Coast Conference Coastal Division. They went to the 2010 College World Series as the fifth overall seed, losing to Oklahoma in the super regional.

== Personnel ==
=== Roster ===
2010 Virginia Cavaliers roster
Pitchers: 11 – Kevin Arico; 12 – Corey Hunt; 16 – Branden Kline; 17 – Shane Halley; 18 – Tyler Wilson; 21 – Dan Grovatt; 22 – Robert Morey; 23 – Danny Hultzen; 25 – Will Roberts; 28 – Chad O'Connor; 31 – Justin Thompson; 32 – Cody Winiarski; 39 – Neal Davis; 47 – Whit Mayberry	Infielders: 1 – Stephen Bruno; 2 – Keith Werman; 4 – Reed Gragnani; 5 – Phil Gosselin; 6 – Chris Taylor; 12 – Corey Hunt; 19 – Steven Proscia; 27 – Tyler Biddix; Catchers: 8 – John Hicks; 10 – Tyler Cannon; 33 – Franco Valdes; 35 – Kenny Swab	Outfielders: 3 – Jarrett Parker; 7 – John Barr; 9 – David Coleman; 21 – Dan Grovatt

=== Coaches ===
2010 Virginia Cavaliers baseball coaching staff
- Brian O'Connor – Head coach – 7th year
- Kevin McMullan – Associate head coach – 7th year
- Karl Kuhn – Assistant coach – 7th year
- Eddie Smith – Assistant coach – 4th year

== Schedule ==
2010 Virginia Cavaliers baseball game log
Regular season

February
Date	Opponent	Site/stadium	Score	Win	Loss	Save	Attendance	Overall record	ACC record
February 19	at East Carolina	Clark–LeClair Stadium • Greenville, North Carolina	6-2					1-0	
February 20	at East Carolina	Clark–LeClair Stadium • Greenville, North Carolina	1-6					1–1	
February 21	at East Carolina	Clark–LeClair Stadium • Greenville, North Carolina	14-11					2–1	
February 24	George Washington	Davenport Field • Charlottesville, Virginia	5-2					3-1	
February 26	Rhode Island	Davenport Field • Charlottesville, Virginia	13-0					4-1	
February 27	Rhode Island	Davenport Field • Charlottesville, Virginia	22-2					5-1	
February 28	Rhode Island	Davenport Field • Charlottesville, Virginia	8-5					6-1	

March
Date	Opponent	Site/stadium	Score	Win	Loss	Save	Attendance	Overall record	ACC record
March 5	Wright State	Davenport Field • Charlottesville, Virginia	1-2					6–2	
March 6	Dartmouth	Davenport Field • Charlottesville, Virginia	14-3					7–2	
March 7	Dartmouth	Davenport Field • Charlottesville, Virginia	11-5					8–2	
March 7	Wright State	Davenport Field • Charlottesville, Virginia	13-3					9–2	
March 10	at William & Mary	Plumeri Park • Williamsburg, Virginia	12-6					10–2	
March 12	at Florida State	Mike Martin Field • Tallahassee, Florida	5-0					11–2	1-0
March 13	at Florida State	Mike Martin Field • Tallahassee, Florida	9-8					12–2	2-0
March 14	at Florida State	Mike Martin Field • Tallahassee, Florida	8-9					12–3	2-1
March 16	William & Mary	Davenport Field • Charlottesville, Virginia	9-1					13–3	
March 17	at James Madison	Veterans Memorial Park • Harrisonburg, Virginia	6-3					14–3	
March 19	Boston College	Davenport Field • Charlottesville, Virginia	7-1					15–3	3-1
March 20	Boston College	Davenport Field • Charlottesville, Virginia	4-3					16–3	4-1
March 21	Boston College	Davenport Field • Charlottesville, Virginia	11-1					17–3	5-1
March 23	Marshall	Davenport Field • Charlottesville, Virginia	6-3					18–3	
March 26	Clemson	Davenport Field • Charlottesville, Virginia	4-3					19–3	6-1
March 27	Clemson	Davenport Field • Charlottesville, Virginia	5-8					19–4	6-2
March 27	Clemson	Davenport Field • Charlottesville, Virginia	3-1					20–4	7-2
March 30	Towson	Davenport Field • Charlottesville, Virginia	8-5					21–4	
March 31	Towson	Davenport Field • Charlottesville, Virginia	17-4					22–4	

April
Date	Opponent	Site/stadium	Score	Win	Loss	Save	Attendance	Overall record	ACC record
April 2	at NC State	Doak Field • Raleigh, North Carolina	5-6^{11}					22–5	7-3
April 3	at NC State	Doak Field • Raleigh, North Carolina	8-4					23–5	8-3
April 4	at NC State	Doak Field • Raleigh, North Carolina	6-7					23–6	8-4
April 6	James Madison	Davenport Field • Charlottesville, Virginia	9-4					24–6	
April 7	Radford	Davenport Field • Charlottesville, Virginia	12-2					25–6	
April 9	Georgia Tech	Davenport Field • Charlottesville, Virginia	7-4					26–6	9-4
April 10	Georgia Tech	Davenport Field • Charlottesville, Virginia	7-9					26–7	9-5
April 11	Georgia Tech	Davenport Field • Charlottesville, Virginia	9-1					27–7	10-5
April 14	at VMI	Gray–Minor Stadium • Lexington, Virginia	3-12					27–8	
April 16	Virginia Tech	Davenport Field • Charlottesville, Virginia	4-2					28–8	11-5
April 17	Virginia Tech	Davenport Field • Charlottesville, Virginia	8-2					29–8	12-5
April 18	Virginia Tech	Davenport Field • Charlottesville, Virginia	5-8					29–9	12-6
April 20	Richmond	Davenport Field • Charlottesville, Virginia	11-3					30–9	
April 21	George Mason	Davenport Field • Charlottesville, Virginia	10-3					31–9	
April 23	at Maryland	Shipley Field • College Park, Maryland	5-1					32–9	13-6
April 23	at Maryland	Shipley Field • College Park, Maryland	27-4					33–9	14-6
April 24	at Maryland	Shipley Field • College Park, Maryland	11-2					34–9	15-6
April 27	Coastal Carolina	Davenport Field • Charlottesville, Virginia	6-3					35–9	
April 28	Georgetown	Davenport Field • Charlottesville, Virginia	10-3					36–9	
April 30	at Duke	Jack Coombs Field • Durham, North Carolina	12-3					37–9	16-6

May
Date	Opponent	Site/stadium	Score	Win	Loss	Save	Attendance	Overall record	ACC record
May 1	at Duke	Jack Coombs Field • Durham, North Carolina	11-1					38–9	17-6
May 2	at Duke	Jack Coombs Field • Durham, North Carolina	10-6					39–9	18-6
May 4	VCU	Davenport Field • Charlottesville, Virginia	10-5					40–9	
May 15	North Carolina	Davenport Field • Charlottesville, Virginia	3-2					41–9	19-6
May 15	North Carolina	Davenport Field • Charlottesville, Virginia	5-1					42–9	20-6
May 16	North Carolina	Davenport Field • Charlottesville, Virginia	5-3					43–9	21-6
May 20	at Miami (FL)	Mark Light Field • Coral Gables, Florida	4-5^{11}					43–10	21-7
May 21	at Miami	Mark Light Field • Miami, Florida	3-1					44–10	22-7
May 22	at Miami	Mark Light Field • Miami, Florida	7-4					45–10	23-7

Postseason

ACC Tournament
Date	Opponent	Site/stadium	Score	Win	Loss	Save	Attendance	Overall record	ACCT Record
May 26	Boston College	NewBridge Bank Park • Greensboro, North Carolina	6-4					46–10	1–0
May 27	Florida State	NewBridge Bank Park • Greensboro, North Carolina	4-11					46–11	1–1
May 28	Miami	NewBridge Bank Park • Greensboro, North Carolina	12-8					47–11	2–1

Charlottesville Regional
Date	Opponent	Site/stadium	Score	Win	Loss	Save	Attendance	Overall record	NCAAT record
June 4	VCU	Davenport Field • Charlottesville, Virginia	15-4					48-11	1–0
June 5	Ole Miss	Davenport Field • Charlottesville, Virginia	13-7					49-11	2–0
June 6	St John's	Davenport Field • Charlottesville, Virginia	5-6					49-12	2–1
June 7	St John's	Davenport Field • Charlottesville, Virginia	5-3					50-12	3–1

Charlottesville Super Regional
Date	Opponent	Site/stadium	Score	Win	Loss	Save	Attendance	Overall record	NCAAT record
June 12	Oklahoma	Davenport Field • Charlottesville, Virginia	3-2					51-12	4–1
June 13	Oklahoma	Davenport Field • Charlottesville, Virginia	7-10					51–13	4–2
June 14	Oklahoma	Davenport Field • Charlottesville, Virginia	0-11					51–14	4–3

== Ranking movements ==
Ranking movements Legend: ██ Increase in ranking ██ Decrease in ranking
	Week																		
Poll	Pre	1	2	3	4	5	6	7	8	9	10	11	12	13	14	15	16	17	Final
Coaches'	4	4*	2	4	2	2	3	5	3	4	3	3	3	2	3	2			10
Baseball America	2	1	1	1	1	1	1	4	2	2	1	1	1	1	1	1			8
Collegiate Baseball^	3	5	3	4	2	2	3	5	4	10	5	3	3	2	2	2	3	10	10
NCBWA†	3	3	2	4	1	1	2	5	1	4	2	2	2	2	2	1	10	10	10

^ Collegiate Baseball ranked 40 teams in their preseason poll, but only ranked 30 teams weekly during the season.
† NCBWA ranks 30 teams in their preseason poll, but only ranks 25 teams weekly during the season.
* A new poll was not released for this week, so for comparison purposes, the previous week's ranking is inserted in this week's slot.
