= Lexington State Bank =

Defunct bank holding company

LSB Bancshares, Inc.
- Company type: Public
- Traded as: Nasdaq: LXBK
- Industry: Banking
- Founded: 1949; 77 years ago
- Defunct: 2007; 19 years ago
- Fate: Merged with FNB Southeast
- Successor: NewBridge Bank (now FNB Corporation)
- Headquarters: Lexington, North Carolina
- Key people: Robert F. Lowe (chairman and CEO)
- Number of employees: 417

Lexington State Bank (commonly known as "LSB") was a banking company based in Lexington, North Carolina. Its motto was "The Bank" and its slogans were "Beeline Banking", and "Easy as L-S-B". The bank had 29 branches across the Piedmont Triad region operating in Davidson, Stokes, Forsyth, Guilford, and Randolph counties of North Carolina. LSB Bancshares, Inc. (Nasdaq: LXBK) was the holding company for Lexington State Bank. In 2007, it merged with FNB Southeast to form NewBridge Bank.

== History ==
LSB was founded in 1949 by Dr. J. A. Smith, a physician, founder of Lexington Hospital, Chairman of the Lexington Utilities Commission, and two-term North Carolina Representative. Shares of the company were sold to citizens of Davidson County, North Carolina who were willing to buy them. The first banking office opened in uptown Lexington's Courthouse Square on July 5, 1949, one day after Independence Day. Dr. Smith became the new bank's President and Chairman of the Board. Assets at the close of business on December 31, 1949, totaled $1,845,680.82, including loans and discounts of $799,626.92. Liabilities included deposits of $1,602,541.59 and other liabilities of $22,201.84, capital of $150,000 and surplus of $70,937.39.

In April 1962, LSB moved its headquarters to an old hardware store at the corner of State Street and West First Street in Lexington. This new "LSB Plaza" expanded as the company grew. The holding company for LSB was created in July 1983 and in 1985 LSB opened its first 24-hour automatic teller machine (ATM) at Lexington Hospital.

In July 1997 Old North State Bank and LSB shareholders agreed to merge into a single company; the LSB name remained.

=== Merger with FNB Southeast ===
On February 27, 2007 Lexington State Bank announced its intention to merge with the Greensboro-based FNB Southeast, a bank nearly equal in assets. With the merger approved by stockholders on July 31, 2007, the new bank is the sixth largest in North Carolina. The post-merger institution, operating under the name NewBridge Bank, began public operations on November 13, 2007. NewBridge Bank has 42 full-service banking offices, total assets of about $2 billion and total deposits of about $1.6 billion, and an increased geographic size including counties in coastal North Carolina and southern Virginia.
