= 2010 ACC tournament =

2010 ACC tournament may refer to:

- 2010 ACC men's basketball tournament
- 2010 ACC women's basketball tournament
- 2010 ACC men's soccer tournament
- 2010 ACC women's soccer tournament
- 2010 Atlantic Coast Conference baseball tournament
- 2010 Atlantic Coast Conference softball tournament
