= Mozart Savings =

American bank

Mozart Savings or Mozart Savings Association was an American bank founded in 1892 and based in Pittsburgh, Pennsylvania.

It merged 31 October 1981 with Parkvale Savings Bank and ceased to be its own concern. Parkvale merged into First National Bank of Pennsylvania in 2012.

== In popular culture ==
In early establishing shots of its 1957 Pittsburgh setting, Fences (2016) featured a large Mozart Savings advertisement painted on the side of a brick building.
