= NewBridge Bank =

Defunct American bank

NewBridge Bancorp
- Traded as: Nasdaq: NBBC
- Industry: Banking
- Predecessor: Lexington State Bank; FNB Southeast
- Founded: November 12, 2007; 18 years ago
- Defunct: March 1, 2016; 10 years ago (as an independent bank); March 11, 2017; 9 years ago (as a brand)
- Fate: Merged with Yadkin Financial
- Successor: Yadkin Financial (now FNB Corporation)
- Headquarters: Greensboro, North Carolina, U.S.
- Number of locations: 45 (2016)
- Key people: Pressley A. Ridgill (president); Pressley A. Ridgill (CEO)
- Products: commercial banking, trust services, financial planning
- Services: Finance, Investments, and Insurance
- Revenue: US$ 21.53 million (Q2 2013)
- Net income: US$ 11.6 million (Q2 2013)
- Total assets: US$ 1.2 billion (Q2 2013)
- Number of employees: 594
- Parent: NewBridge Bancorp (2007–2016); Yadkin Financial (2016–2017)
- Website: newbridgebank.com

NewBridge Bank was a banking company based in Greensboro, North Carolina, with locations in North Carolina and Virginia. It no longer operates under that name. The company formed from the merger of Lexington State Bank and FNB Southeast in November 2007. NewBridge Bank was the banking subsidiary of NewBridge Bancorp (Nasdaq: NBBC). NewBridge Bank had 44 branches, total assets of about $2.7 billion and total deposits of about $2 billion. Its branches were mainly centered on the North Carolina regions of the Piedmont Triad and the Lower Cape Fear.

== History ==
=== Lexington State Bank ===
Lexington State Bank (commonly known as "LSB") was founded in Lexington, North Carolina in 1949 by Dr. J. A. Smith, a physician, founder of Lexington Hospital, Chairman of the Lexington Utilities Commission, and two-term North Carolina Representative. Shares of the company were sold to citizens of Davidson County who were willing to buy them. The first banking office opened in uptown Lexington's Courthouse Square on July 5, 1949, one day after Independence Day. Dr. Smith became the new bank's President and Chairman of the Board. Assets at the close of business on December 31, 1949, totaled $1,845,680.82, including loans and discounts of $799,626.92. Liabilities included deposits of $1,602,541.59 and other liabilities of $22,201.84, capital of $150,000 and surplus of $70,937.39.

In April 1962, LSB moved its headquarters to an old hardware store at the corner of State Street and West First Street in Lexington. This new "LSB Plaza" expanded as the company grew. The holding company for LSB was created in July 1983 and in 1985 LSB opened its first 24-hour automatic teller machine (ATM) at Lexington Hospital.

In July 1997, Winston-Salem-based Old North State Bank and LSB shareholders agreed to merge into a single company; the LSB name remained.

LSB's motto was "The Bank" and its slogans were "Beeline Banking", and "Easy as L-S-B". At its height, the bank had 29 branches across the Piedmont Triad region operating in Davidson, Stokes, Forsyth, Guilford, and Randolph counties of North Carolina. LSB Bancshares, Inc. was the holding company for Lexington State Bank.

On May 23, 2011, Union First Market Bankshares Corporation and NewBridge Bancorp announced that their respective subsidiary banks have received all necessary regulatory approvals and have closed on the purchase agreement for the NewBridge Bank branch located at 440 South Main Street in Harrisonburg, Virginia.

=== FNB Southeast ===
FNB Southeast, a subsidiary of FNB Financial Services Corporation, was a bank based in Reidsville. It was founded in 1910, and throughout its existence provided community banking services to locations in North Carolina and Virginia.

=== NewBridge Bank ===
On February 27, 2007 Lexington State Bank announced its intention to merge with the Greensboro-based FNB Southeast, a bank nearly equal in assets. With the merger approved by stockholders on July 31, 2007, the new bank is the sixth largest in North Carolina. The post-merger institution, operating under the name NewBridge Bank, began public operations on November 13, 2007.

As of May 20, 2011, Union First Market Bank acquired the Harrisonburg, Virginia branch of NewBridge Bank.

On October 1, 2013, NewBridge Bank completed its acquisition of Security Savings Bank of Southport, North Carolina, with six branches, giving the bank an increased presence in the Wilmington, North Carolina area.

On November 1, 2013 NewBridge Bank announced the merger with Raleigh-based bank, CapStone Bank, which had $381.6 million in assets, in a deal valued then at $63.6 million. With the completion of the merger announced April 1, 2014, NewBridge Bank had $2.4 billion in assets and 40 locations.

At a 2014 meeting of shareholders, NewBridge indicated an interest in adding markets in Virginia, as well as expanding in South Carolina.

On March 2, 2015, NewBridge completed the $19.8 million acquisition of Premier Commercial Bank, started in 2008, with $168 million in assets and one banking office in Greensboro and several mortgage offices around the area and in Charlotte.

On October 13, 2015, Yadkin Financial and NewBridge announced a $456 million deal expected to close in second quarter 2016, which would give Yadkin $7.1 billion in assets and 112 branches. Yadkin had few branches in the Piedmont Triad, where NewBridge had 28 branches, nine each in Davidson and Guilford Counties and four in Forsyth County. However, Yadkin said in its third-quarter 2016 report that the merging of NewBridge and Yadkin systems, delayed from September, would not take place because Yadkin was purchased by FNB Corporation; Newbridge Bank locations rebranded and integrated into FNB Corporation along with existing Yadkin locations.
