= First National Bank Field =

Baseball park in Greensboro, North Carolina

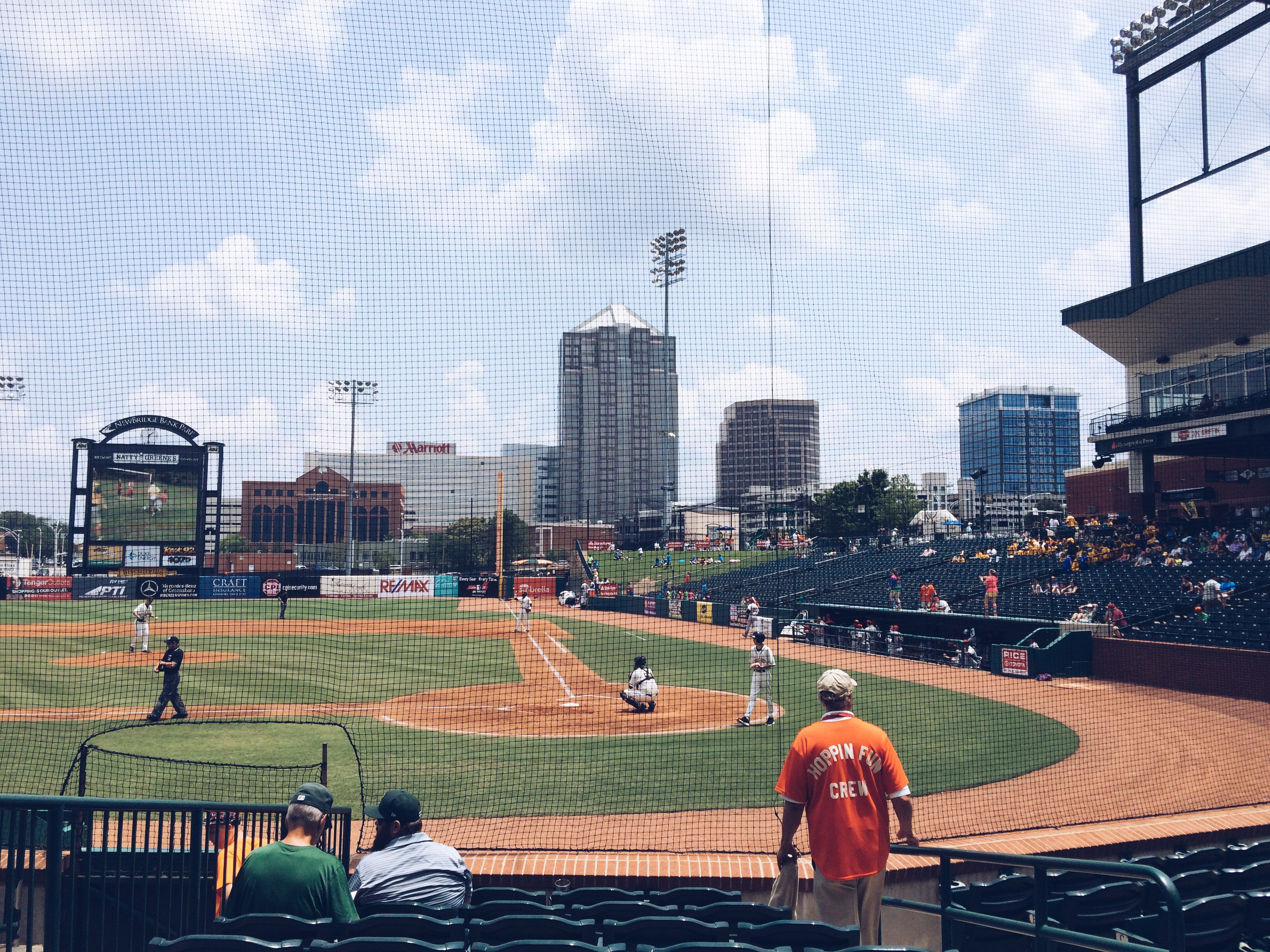

- Location within North Carolina Location within the United States
- Former names: First Horizon Park (2005–2007); NewBridge Bank Park (2008–2015); Yadkin Bank Park (2016)
- Location: 408 Bellemeade Street; Greensboro, North Carolina; United States
- Coordinates: 36°4′36″N 79°47′41″W
- Owner: Temerity Baseball
- Operator: Temerity Baseball
- Capacity: 7,599
- Surface: Grass
- Field size: Left Field: 315 ft (96 m); Left Field Jog: 322 ft (98 m); Left-Center: 365 ft (111 m); Center Field: 400 ft (122 m); Right-Center: 362 ft (110 m); Right Field Jog: 320 ft (98 m); Right Field: 312 ft (95 m)

Construction
- Groundbreaking: January 21, 2004
- Opened: April 3, 2005
- Cost: $21.5 million ($35.4 million in 2025 dollars)
- Architects: Tetra Tech; Moser Mayer Phoenix Associates
- General contractor: Barton Malow/Samet

Tenant
- Greensboro Grasshoppers (SAL) 2005–present

First National Bank Field is a Minor League Baseball park located in downtown Greensboro, North Carolina. The home of the Greensboro Grasshoppers of the South Atlantic League, it opened on April 3, 2005. The park is on the block bounded by Bellemeade, Edgeworth, Smith, and Eugene Streets.

The stadium's seating capacity is 7,499 people, 5,300 of which are chair-back seats. The stadium was built to Double-A standards and has room for future expansion. In 2017, the Grasshoppers had the best average attendance in the South Atlantic League and the highest total attendance in the league.

== History ==
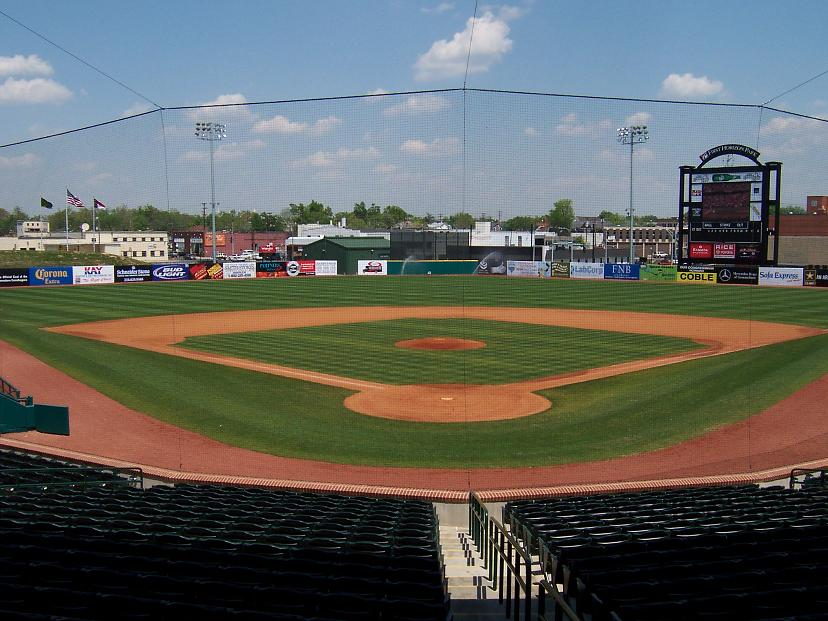
The ballpark in 2005

The Grasshoppers moved to First National Bank Field after the 2004 season, leaving their previous home of many decades, World War Memorial Stadium. Lindsay Street, which once cut through the property of the new park, now T's into Eugene, and also provides a direct path to the old stadium. Greensboro's downtown stadium opened its gates to a crowd of 8,540 on April 3, 2005, with a Grasshoppers exhibition game against the Florida Marlins, who were their Major League Baseball affiliate. In the first regular season game, the Grasshoppers defeated the Hickory Crawdads, 3–2, in front of 8,017 fans.

On May 5, 2009, it was announced that the 2010 Atlantic Coast Conference baseball tournament would be held at the facility, a change from the discussed location of Fenway Park in Boston, due to economic reasons. Florida State won the tournament.

From May 23 to 27, 2012, the park hosted the 2012 Atlantic Coast Conference baseball tournament, which was won by Georgia Tech. During this time, the University of North Carolina took on North Carolina State University in a game that broke the record for attendance at a college baseball game in the state of North Carolina. It was also the largest crowd ever for an ACC baseball game. The attendance, 10,229, was the largest crowd in the history of First National Bank Field.

== Features ==
A 30-foot-wide open concrete concourse wraps around the ballpark, giving fans the opportunity to see the game from any vantage point in the stadium. Fans are served at three major concession stands with 36 points of sale. Other amenities include a grandstand outdoor sports bar and a kid-safe play park. There are 16 luxury suites, 26 grandstand boxes, picnic areas, and a grandstand party deck in the left field corner.

== Naming rights ==
The ballpark opened in 2005 as First Horizon Park. Memphis, Tennessee-based First Horizon National Corporation was awarded the naming rights on December 7, 2004, for 10 years. On November 7, 2007, it was formally announced that locally based NewBridge Bank had acquired the ballpark's naming rights, after First Horizon National Corporation ended their agreement with the Grasshoppers. The deal was originally through the 2017 season. However, Yadkin Bank's acquisition of NewBridge Bank resulted in a name change for the ballpark, effective in the 2016 season. FNB Corporation of Pittsburgh made an offer for Yadkin Bank in 2016. The team and FNB Corporation announced March 6, 2017, that First National Bank will continue the NewBridge sponsorship, and the stadium's new name for the 2017 season would be First National Bank Field.
