= Christopher Duffy (baseball) =

American baseball player

Chris Duffy
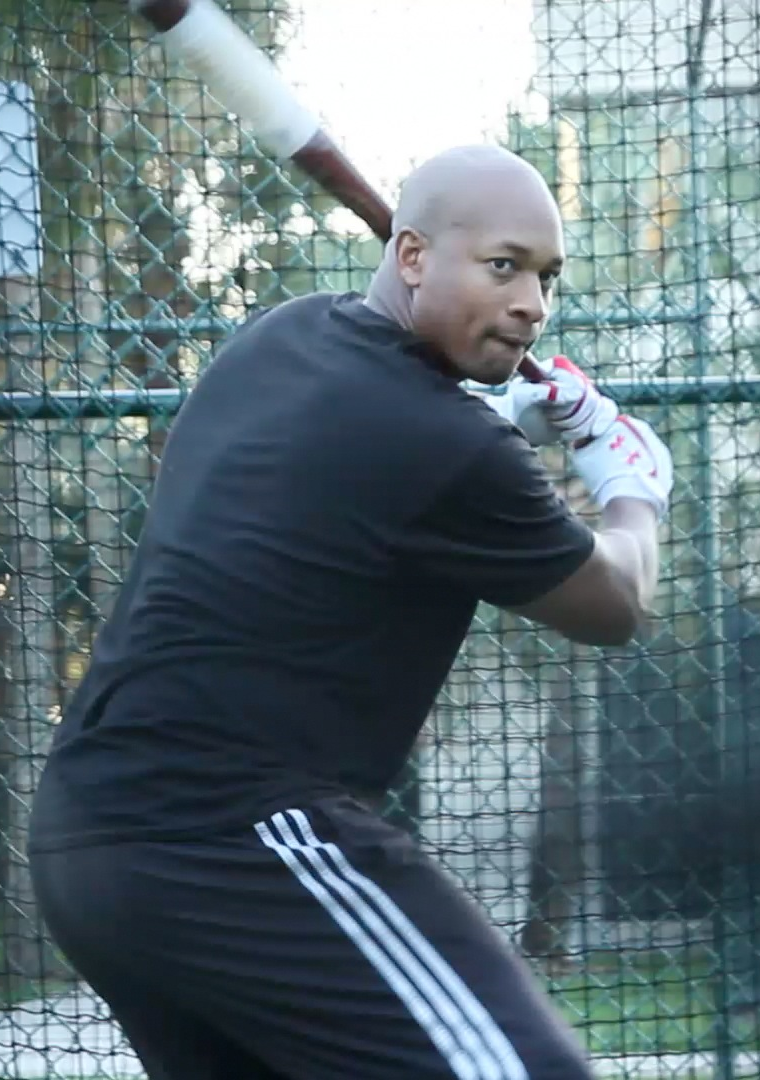
- First baseman
- Born: December 17, 1987 (age 38); New York, New York, U.S.
- Bats: Left Throws: Right
- Stats at Baseball Reference

Chris Duffy (born December 17, 1987) is a former professional baseball player.

== College career ==
Duffy was drafted out of Cypress Creek High School by the Chicago White Sox in the 9th round of the 2006 Major League Baseball draft but elected to attend the University of Central Florida, where he played outfield for the Central Florida Knights baseball team from 2007-2010. His parents suggested he attend college to mature.

Duffy was a starter through his career with the Knights but had his breakout season as a senior, hitting .447 with 21 home runs and 81 runs batted in. He was named a finalist for the Golden Spikes Award and earned first-team All-American honors.

Duffy currently holds the C-USA record for batting average (.447) and slugging percentage (.850).

== Professional career ==
Duffy was drafted by the Philadelphia Phillies in the 26th round of the 2010 Major League Baseball draft. He spent the rest of the 2010 and the entire 2011 season with the GCL Phillies before splitting the 2012 season between the Lakewood BlueClaws and Clearwater Threshers.

In April 2013, Duffy signed with the Camden Riversharks.

Duffy ended up spending the year with the New Jersey Jackals of the Can-Am League. where he hit .293 with 13 homers and 63 RBI, and was named to the league's All Star team.
