= Yadkin Financial =

American bank holding company

Yadkin Financial Corporation was a bank holding company and the parent of Yadkin Bank, a defunct regional bank with $7.3 billion in assets and 110 branches in North and South Carolina, before the 2017 purchase by FNB Corporation of Pittsburgh. The bank was headquartered in Elkin, North Carolina.

On July 4, 2014, Yadkin Financial and VantageSouth Bancshares Inc. completed a merger which resulted in the largest community bank based in North Carolina, and the fourth-largest bank headquartered in the state, with $4 billion in assets and $3.2 billion in deposits. The company was headquartered in Raleigh, North Carolina, with banking operations based in Statesville, North Carolina.

== History of Yadkin Bank ==
The original bank was opened in 1968. However, in three years Yadkin Valley Bank grew significantly by the acquisition of two other regional banks (Main Street Bankshares, Inc. in June 2002, operating as "Piedmont Bank", and High Country Financial Corporation in January 2004, operating as "High Country Bank") and a mortgage broker (Sidus Financial LLC in October 2004), as well as opening new branch locations. Piedmont Bank and High Country Bank were reorganized as divisions of Yadkin Valley Bank but maintained their names and logos. Sidus remained as a wholly owned subsidiary.

Yadkin Valley Bank and its divisions operated 23 full-service branch locations. As of December 31, 2005, the company achieved a milestone in the bank's history by reaching the US$1 billion mark in total assets for the first time.

On July 1, 2006, the company reorganized into a holding company, becoming Yadkin Valley Financial Corporation.

Yadkin Valley Bank announced in June 2007 that it was buying Cardinal State Bank of Durham, North Carolina, which had been founded to serve the growing Triangle region. Yadkin Valley said the combined bank would have 28 branches in a dozen North Carolina counties.

Yadkin Valley Bank acquired American Community Bank of Monroe, North Carolina, in 2009.

As of May 28, 2013, all of the banks Yadkin Valley had acquired would have one name, Yadkin Bank. The holding company also changed names to Yadkin Financial Corporation. With $1.9 billion in assets and 36 branches, Yadkin Valley Bank would become Yadkin Bank and its NASDAQ symbol would change from YAVY to YDKN.

== History of VantageSouth ==
In 2005, VantageSouth began in Burlington, North Carolina.

In 2009, J. Adam Abram and Steven Lerner started Piedmont Community Bank Holdings. In 2010, Piedmont bought a majority stake in VantageSouth.

On October 5, 2011, it was announced that Piedmont would buy VantageSouth, which had two branches in Burlington, $91 million in assets and $73 million in deposits, and that the company would take the name VantageSouth. Piedmont had a controlling interest in VantageSouth and in Salisbury, North Carolina–based Community Bank of Rowan, which would also merge with the company.

On October 24, 2011, Piedmont announced it would acquire a controlling interest in Cary, North Carolina–based Crescent Financial Bancshares, parent of Crescent State Bank. Abram would become Crescent chairman, and Piedmont president and former RBC Bank CEO Scott Custer would be Crescent CEO.

In August 2012, Crescent announced a merger with VantageSouth, which had five branches and $260.7 million in assets as of September 30 and was called by Custer "one of the most profitable banks in North Carolina." On December 3, the fifteen Crescent branches took the VantageSouth name. Custer became CEO and VantageSouth CEO Steve Jones became president.

On September 25, 2012, Crescent and Engelhard, North Carolina–based East Carolina Bank, with 25 branches, announced their merger. Once the East Carolina deal was completed, VantageSouth had 45 branches in central and eastern North Carolina and $2 billion in assets. It was announced in January 2014 that five of those will close.

== History of Yadkin Financial ==
On January 27, 2014, Yadkin Financial and VantageSouth announced a "merger of equals". The new company was called Yadkin Financial Corp. and was based in Raleigh. Banking operations were based in Statesville, North Carolina. VantageSouth president and CEO Scott Custer will become Yadkin Financial CEO, and Yadkin Financial's Joe Towell becomes executive chairman. VantageSouth chairman Adam Abram will remain on the board. Yadkin will have $4 billion in assets, $3.2 billion in deposits,

The completion of the merger happened July 4 and the VantageSouth disappeared. Signs were to be changed by September.

On March 1, 2016, Yadkin Financial and NewBridge Bancorp completed a $456 million deal, which gave Yadkin $7.3 billion in assets and 110 branches. Yadkin had few branches in the Piedmont Triad, where NewBridge had most of its locations.

Even before changing the signs on NewBridge branches, Yadkin agreed to a $1.4 billion deal with FNB Corporation of Pittsburgh.

With the completion of the FNB deal, conversion of Yadkin Bank branches to First National Bank took place March 11, 2017.
