= Ben Rowen =

American baseball player (born 1988)

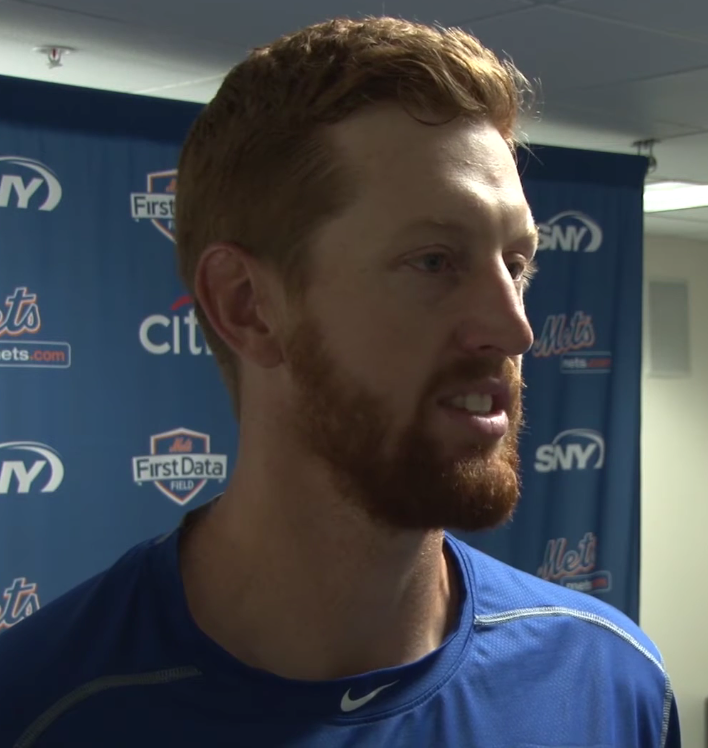
- Rowen with the New York Mets during spring training in 2017
- Pitcher
- Born: November 15, 1988 (age 37); Dunedin, Florida, U.S.
- Batted: Right Threw: Right

MLB debut
- June 15, 2014, for the Texas Rangers

Last MLB appearance
- May 4, 2021, for the Los Angeles Angels

MLB statistics
- Win–loss record: 0–0
- Earned run average: 6.26
- Strikeouts: 17
- Stats at Baseball Reference

Teams
- Texas Rangers (2014); Milwaukee Brewers (2016); Los Angeles Angels (2021)

Benjamin Ramon Rowen (born November 15, 1988) is an American professional baseball former pitcher and current scout and coach. He played in Major League Baseball (MLB) for the Texas Rangers, Milwaukee Brewers, and Los Angeles Angels. After his retirement as a player, he joined the Angels organization as an advance scout.

== Early life ==
Rowen was born in Dunedin, Florida to Michael and Darlene Rowen. He lived with his family in East Aurora, New York between the ages of two and nine. The family thereafter moved to California where Michael Rowen worked for Moog Inc.

As a freshman at Palos Verdes High School in Palos Verdes, California, Rowen dropped his arm angle and became a submarine pitcher. After high school he pitched at Los Angeles Harbor College for two years before transferring to Virginia Tech. In 2009, he played collegiate summer baseball with the Cotuit Kettleers of the Cape Cod Baseball League.

== Professional career ==
=== Texas Rangers ===
The Texas Rangers selected Rowen in the 22nd round of the 2010 Major League Baseball draft. He made his professional debut for the Spokane Indians that year. In 33 innings pitched he had a 1.09 earned run average and 30 strikeouts.

Pitching for the Hickory Crawdads in 2011, Rowen had a 1.98 ERA and 43 strikeouts in 59 innings. In 2012, while pitching for the Myrtle Beach Pelicans, Rowen was the MiLB Relief Pitcher of the Year. For the season he had a 1.57 ERA, 19 saves and 52 strikeouts in 57 1/3 innings. In 2013, he was invited to the Rangers spring training. He started the season with the Frisco RoughRiders. He was promoted to the Round Rock Express in July.

Rowen was called up to the majors for the first time on June 11, 2014, and he made his major league debut on June 15, pitching a scoreless inning of relief against the Seattle Mariners. In eight appearances out of the bullpen he had a 4.15 ERA. The Rangers designated him for assignment on December 16, 2014 and he was released a few days later.

=== Baltimore Orioles ===
Rowen signed a minor league contract with the Los Angeles Dodgers on January 20, 2015, that included an invitation to spring training. The Dodgers assigned him to the Double-A Tulsa Drillers, but before the minor league season started he was traded to the Baltimore Orioles (along with minor league catcher Chris O'Brien) in exchange for Ryan Webb, minor league catcher Brian Ward, and a competitive balance draft pick. He opted out of his contract on July 1.

=== Chicago Cubs ===
Rowen signed a minor league deal with the Chicago Cubs on July 5, 2015. He was called up on July 29, but was designated for assignment two days later without making an appearance.

=== Toronto Blue Jays ===
On August 3, 2015, Rowen was claimed off waivers by the Toronto Blue Jays and assigned to the Triple-A Buffalo Bisons. He was invited to Major League spring training, and optioned to minor league camp on March 13. On August 1, 2016, Rowen was designated for assignment.

=== Milwaukee Brewers ===
Rowen was claimed off waivers by the Milwaukee Brewers on August 4, 2016. In four appearances for Milwaukee, he surrendered six runs (five earned) on ten hits across three innings. Rowen was removed from the 40–man roster and sent outright to the Triple–A Colorado Springs SkySox on November 7. He subsequently rejected the assignment and elected free agency.

=== New York Mets ===
On December 15, 2016, Rowen signed a minor league contract with the New York Mets organization. He made 54 appearances out of the bullpen for the Triple–A Las Vegas 51s, recording a 4.41 ERA with 52 strikeouts in 63 1/3 innings pitched. Rowen elected free agency following the season on November 6.

=== Cincinnati Reds ===
On January 19, 2018, Rowen signed a minor league deal with the Cincinnati Reds. He was released on May 9, 2018.

=== Sugar Land Skeeters ===
On June 3, 2018, Rowen signed with the Sugar Land Skeeters of the Atlantic League of Professional Baseball.

=== Atlanta Braves ===
On January 18, 2019, Rowen signed a minor league deal with the Atlanta Braves. On July 19, he pitched in the Triple-A All-Star Game.

Rowen did not play in a game in 2020 due to the cancellation of the minor league season because of the COVID-19 pandemic. He became a free agent on November 2, 2020.

=== Los Angeles Angels ===
On December 14, 2020, Rowen signed a minor league deal with the Los Angeles Angels. On April 12, 2021, Rowen was selected to the active roster. He made his Angels debut that day, his first major league appearance since 2016, throwing 1 shutout inning. After allowing 8 runs in 11 1/3 innings, Rowen was designated for assignment on May 5. On May 8, after clearing waivers, he was outrighted to the Triple-A Salt Lake Bees. On October 14, Rowen elected free agency.

== Post-playing career ==
On December 10, 2021, Rowen announced his retirement from professional baseball, and joined the Los Angeles Angels in an advanced scouting position.

== Pitching style ==
Rowen pitched with a submarine-style delivery. Rowen threw three pitches: a two-seam fastball, a slider, and a changeup. He was compared to former submarine reliever Chad Bradford due to their low fastball velocity. Rowen's fastball topped out between 78–82 miles per hour (126–132 km/h). In 2021, Rowen switched to an overhand pitching delivery.
