= 2010 Atlantic Coast Conference baseball tournament =

American college baseball tournament

- 2010 ACC baseball tournament logo
- Teams: 8
- Format: 2 division round robin and championship game
- Finals site: NewBridge Bank Park; Greensboro, NC
- Champions: Florida State Seminoles (5th title)
- Winning coach: Mike Martin (5th title)
- MVP: Harold Riggins (NC State Wolfpack)
- Television: ACCRSN

The 2010 Atlantic Coast Conference baseball tournament was held at NewBridge Bank Park in Greensboro, North Carolina, from May 26 through 30. The #5 seeded Florida State Seminoles won the tournament and earned the Atlantic Coast Conference's automatic bid to the 2010 NCAA Division I baseball tournament. It was Florida State's fifth ACC tournament win and first since 2004. A record 6,247 were in attendance for the championship game.

2010 was the fourth year in which the conference used a round-robin tournament format, with the team with the best record in each group at the end of the three-game round robin advancing to a one-game championship.

== Seeding Procedure ==
From TheACC.com:

The top two teams from both the Atlantic and Coastal divisions, as determined by conference winning percentage, in addition to the four teams with the next best conference winning percentage, regardless of division, will be selected to participate in the ACC Baseball Championship. The two division champions will automatically be seeded number one and two based on winning percentage in overall conference competition. The remaining teams will be seeded (three through eight) based on winning percentage in overall conference competition without regard to division. All ties will be broken using the tie-breaking provisions.

Atlantic Division
Team	W	L	Pct	GB	Seed
Clemson	18	12	.600	–	2
Florida State	18	12	.600	–	5
NC State	15	15	.500	3	7
Boston College	14	16	.467	4	8
Wake Forest	8	22	.267	10	
Maryland	5	25	.200	13	

Coastal Division
Team	W	L	Pct	GB	Seed
Virginia	23	7	.767	–	1
Georgia Tech	21	9	.700	2	3
Miami	20	10	.667	3	4
Virginia Tech	16	14	.533	7	6
North Carolina	14	16	.467	9	
Duke	8	22	.267	15	

== Tournament ==
	Division A	UVA	MIA	FSU	BC	Overall
1	Virginia (23–7)		W 12–8	L 4–11	W 6–4	2–1^{1}
4	Miami (20–10)	L 8–12		W 9–3	L 10–12^{†}	1–2
5	Florida State (18–12)	W 11–4	L 3–9		W 12–2^{‡}	2–1^{1}
8	Boston College (14–16)	L 4–6	W 12–10^{†}	L 2–12^{‡}		1–2

	Division B	CLEM	GT	VT	NCSU	Overall
2	Clemson (18–12)		W 9–3	L 8–9	L 8–13	1–2
3	Georgia Tech (21–9)	L 3–9		L 2–6	W 17–5^{‡}	1–2
6	Virginia Tech (16–14)	W 9–8	W 6–2		L 9–10^{†}	2–1^{2}
7	NC State (15–15)	W 13–8	L 5–17^{‡}	W 10–9^{†}		2–1^{2}

Finals
A	#5 Florida State	8
B	#7 NC State	3

Notes
† - Denotes extra innings
‡ - Denotes game shortened due to mercy rule
1 - Florida State beat Virginia head-to-head
2 - NC State beat Virginia Tech head-to-head

== Results ==
=== Division A ===
Team	1	2	3	4	5	6	7	8	9	R	H	E
#8 Boston College	0	1	0	0	0	0	3	0	0	4	7	1
#1 Virginia	2	0	1	0	0	0	0	3	X	6	5	0
WP: Tyler Wilson (7–3) LP: Taylor Lasko (4–2) Sv: Kevin Arico (16); Home runs: BC: John Spatola (16); UVA: Phil Gosselin (8), Dan Grovatt (7)

Team	1	2	3	4	5	6	7	8	9	R	H	E
#5 Florida State	0	0	2	0	1	0	0	0	0	3	6	1
#4 Miami	0	3	0	2	3	0	1	0	X	9	7	2
WP: Eric Whaley (5–1) LP: Sean Gilmartin (6–7); Home runs: FSU: None; MIA: Harold Martinez (18), Nathan Melendres (5), Michael Broad (4)

Team	1	2	3	4	5	6	7	8	9	10	11	12	R	H	E
#4 Miami	0	0	0	0	0	4	0	1	5	0	0	0	10	13	1
#8 Boston College	2	0	0	0	2	0	1	0	5	0	0	2	12	14	1
WP: Kevin Moran (8–5) LP: Travis Miller (1–1); Home runs: MIA: Yasmani Grandal (14), Zeke DeVoss (8); BC: John Spatola (17), Matt Watson (7), Andrew Lawrence (3)

Team	1	2	3	4	5	6	7	8	9	R	H	E
#1 Virginia	0	1	0	0	2	0	0	1	0	4	6	0
#5 Florida State	1	3	0	2	0	0	1	4	X	11	14	0
WP: Geoff Parker (4–1) LP: Robert Morey (9–3); Home runs: UVA: Steven Proscia (9); FSU: Mike McGee 2 (13), Stephen Cardullo 3 (8)

Team	1	2	3	4	5	6	7	8	9	R	H	E
#8 Boston College	0	0	0	0	0	2	0	–	–	2	5	1
#5 Florida State	0	2	4	2	2	1	1^{1}	–	–	12	15	1
WP: John Gast (7–3) LP: John Leonard (2–3); Home runs: BC: Mickey Wiswall (19); FSU: Sherman Johnson (6), James Ramsey (9), Devon Travis (3)

1 - Game ended in the bottom of the seventh inning due to the Mercy Rule.

Team	1	2	3	4	5	6	7	8	9	R	H	E
#4 Miami	0	2	4	0	1	0	0	0	1	8	7	3
#1 Virginia	1	1	3	0	0	4	3	0	X	12	15	2
WP: Danny Hultzen (9–1) LP: E.J. Encinosa (1–1); Home runs: MIA: Zeke DeVoss (9), Harold Martinez (19), Nathan Melendres (6), Michael Broad (5); UVA: Phil Gosselin (9), Dan Grovatt (8), Steven Proscia (10)

=== Division B ===
Team	1	2	3	4	5	6	7	8	9	R	H	E
#7 NC State	0	2	0	0	1	5	2	0	3	13	16	2
#2 Clemson	1	0	1	0	2	0	1	3	0	8	11	1
WP: Alex Sogard (2–2) LP: Alex Frederick (6–2); Home runs: NCSU: Kyle Wilson (7), Drew Poulk (11); CLEM: Jeff Schaus (11), Will Lamb (3)

Team	1	2	3	4	5	6	7	8	9	R	H	E
#6 Virginia Tech	2	1	0	0	0	1	1	1	0	6	6	1
#3 Georgia Tech	0	0	1	0	0	0	0	1	0	2	4	0
WP: Justin Wright (8–4) LP: Deck McGuire (8–4); Home runs: VT: Austin Wates (8), Michael Seaborn (7); GT: Jay Dantzler (7), Jeff Rowland (10)

Team	1	2	3	4	5	6	7	8	9	R	H	E
#2 Clemson	0	2	0	4	0	0	1	1	0	8	7	2
#6 Virginia Tech	5	0	0	1	1	1	0	1	X	9	13	4
WP: Ben Rowen (5–1) LP: Kevin Kyle (0–1); Home runs: CLEM: Jeff Schaus (15), Brad Miller (7); VT: Buddy Sosnoskie (10), Andrew Rash (5)

Team	1	2	3	4	5	6	7	8	9	R	H	E
#3 Georgia Tech	2	0	4	0	0	4	7	–	–	17	11	1
#7 NC State	1	0	0	4	0	0	0^{1}	–	–	5	6	5
WP: Brandon Cumpton (9–2) LP: Jake Buchanan (7–5); Home runs: GT: None; NCSU: Harold Riggins (11), Pratt Maynard (11)

1 - Game ended after the bottom of the seventh inning due to the Mercy Rule.

Team	1	2	3	4	5	6	7	8	9	R	H	E
#3 Georgia Tech	0	0	0	1	0	0	1	1	0	3	10	1
#2 Clemson	3	0	0	1	1	0	2	2	X	9	13	10
WP: Will Lamb (4–4) LP: Jed Bradley (9–4); Home runs: GT: Matt Skole (19); CLEM: Kyle Parker (19), Richie Shaffer (4)

Team	1	2	3	4	5	6	7	8	9	10	R	H	E
#7 NC State	0	1	4	2	1	0	0	0	1	1	10	14	2
#6 Virginia Tech	1	0	0	7	0	0	1	0	0	0	9	13	5
WP: Jake Buchanan (8–6) LP: Ben Rowen (5–2) Sv: Grant Sasser (5); Home runs: NCSU: Harold Riggins (12), John Gianis (3); VT: Steve Domecus (12), Andrew Rash (6)

=== Championship final ===
Team	1	2	3	4	5	6	7	8	9	R	H	E
#7 NC State	0	1	0	1	1	0	0	0	0	3	7	1
#5 Florida State	0	2	0	0	0	0	2	4	X	8	12	0
WP: Sean Gilmartin (7–7) LP: Grant Sasser (3–4); Home runs: NCSU: Andrew Ciencin (10); FSU: Mike McGee (14)

== All-Tournament Team ==
Position	Player	School
1B	Harold Riggins	NC State
2B	Dallas Poulk	NC State
3B	Harold Martinez	Miami
SS	Stephen Cardullo	Florida State
C	Steve Domecus	Virginia Tech
OF	Kyle Wilson	NC State
OF	Tyler Holt	Florida State
OF	Austin Wates	Virginia Tech
DH/UT	Michael Broad	Miami
P	Justin Wright	Virginia Tech
P	Jake Buchanan	NC State
MVP	Harold Riggins	NC State

Source: theacc.com

== See also ==
- College World Series
- NCAA Division I Baseball Championship
