= Sean Gilmartin =

American baseball player (born 1990)

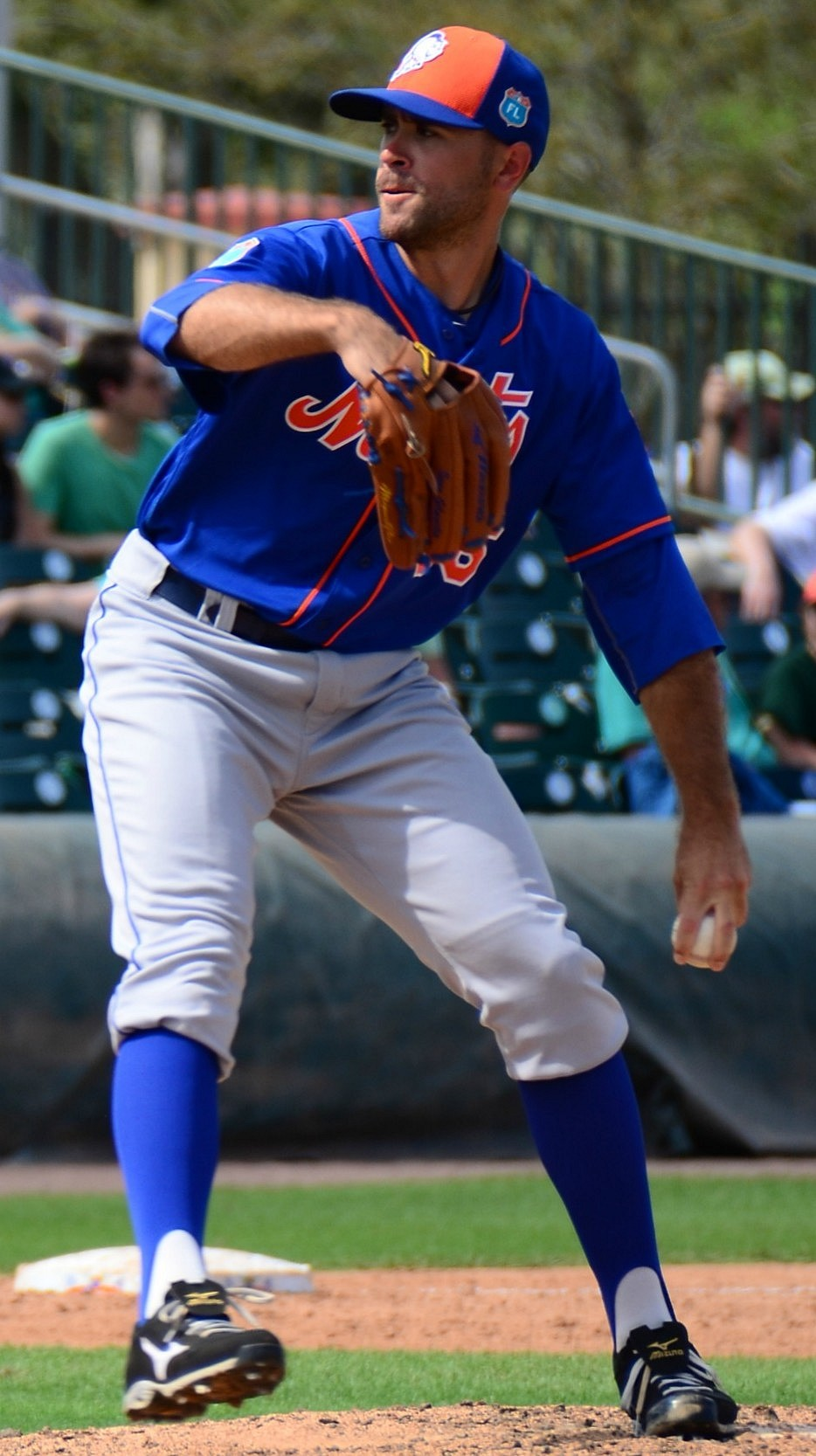
- Gilmartin with the Mets in 2016
- Pitcher
- Born: May 8, 1990 (age 36); Moorpark, California, U.S.
- Batted: Left Threw: Left

MLB debut
- April 10, 2015, for the New York Mets

Last MLB appearance
- August 22, 2020, for the Tampa Bay Rays

MLB statistics
- Win–loss record: 4–5
- Earned run average: 4.34
- Strikeouts: 90
- Stats at Baseball Reference

Teams
- New York Mets (2015–2017); Baltimore Orioles (2018–2019); Tampa Bay Rays (2020)

Sean Patrick Gilmartin (born May 8, 1990) is an American former professional baseball pitcher. He played in Major League Baseball (MLB) for the New York Mets, Baltimore Orioles and Tampa Bay Rays. Gilmartin was the 28th overall selection in the 2011 Major League Baseball draft by the Atlanta Braves. Prior to beginning his professional career, Gilmartin attended Florida State University, and was an All-American pitcher for the Seminoles baseball team.

== Early years ==
Gilmartin was born in Moorpark, California, to Paul J., a chiropractor, and JoAnna Gilmartin. He attended Crespi Carmelite High School in Encino, California. After graduating from high school, the San Diego Padres selected Gilmartin in the 31st round of the 2008 Major League Baseball draft. Gilmartin opted not to sign with San Diego, instead attending college.

Gilmartin enrolled at Florida State University in 2009, receiving a scholarship to play college baseball for the Florida State Seminoles baseball team. As a junior in 2011, Gilmartin was named an All-American by Baseball America.

== Professional career ==
=== Atlanta Braves ===
Gilmartin was drafted by the Atlanta Braves in the first round, with the 28th overall selection, of the 2011 Major League Baseball draft. He signed with the Braves, receiving a $1.134 million signing bonus. In the Atlanta farm system, Gilmartin played with the Gulf Coast League Braves, Rome Braves, Mississippi Braves, and the Gwinnett Braves.

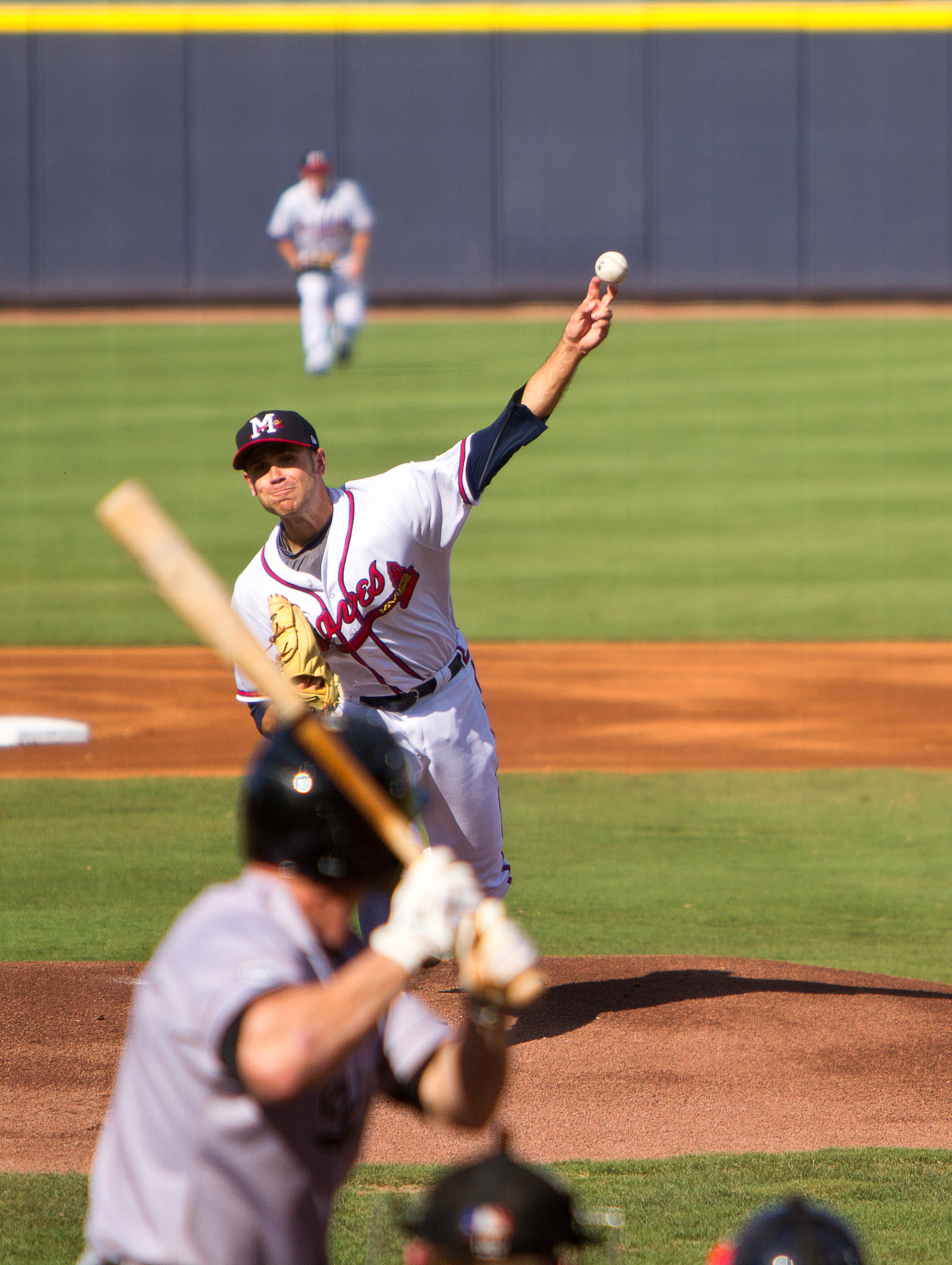
Gilmartin pitching for the Mississippi Braves in 2012

Prior to the 2012 season, Gilmartin was ranked as the Braves' fifth best prospect by Baseball America. Gilmartin was invited to spring training in 2013, but did not make the team. He played for the Gwinnett Braves of the Triple–A International League, though his performance was limited by shoulder injuries.

=== Minnesota Twins ===
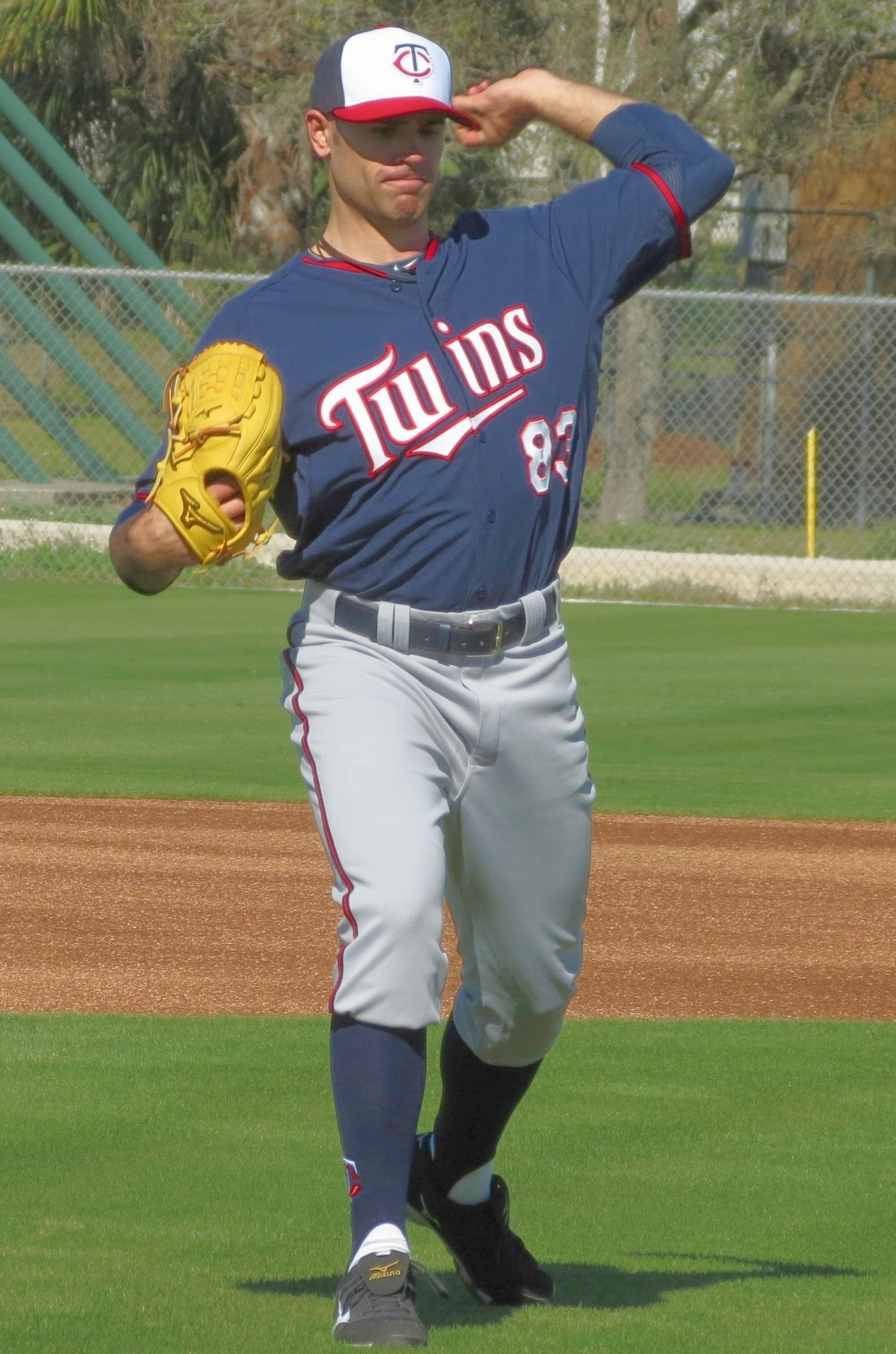
Gilmartin with the Minnesota Twins in 2014 spring training

After the 2013 season, the Braves traded Gilmartin to the Minnesota Twins for Ryan Doumit on December 18, 2013. He pitched for the New Britain Rock Cats and the Rochester Red Wings in 2014.

Gilmartin with the Rock Cats finished 7–3, 3.12 ERA in 12 games in 72 innings pitched with 74 strikeouts with a WHIP of 1.278 while giving up 76 hits, 30 runs (25 of them earned), 2 home runs, and 16 walks.

With the Red Wings he finished 2–4, 4.28 ERA in 14 games in 73 2/3 innings pitched with 59 strikeouts with a WHIP of 1.317 while giving up 69 hits, 39 runs (35 of them earned), 7 home runs, and 28 walks.

=== New York Mets ===
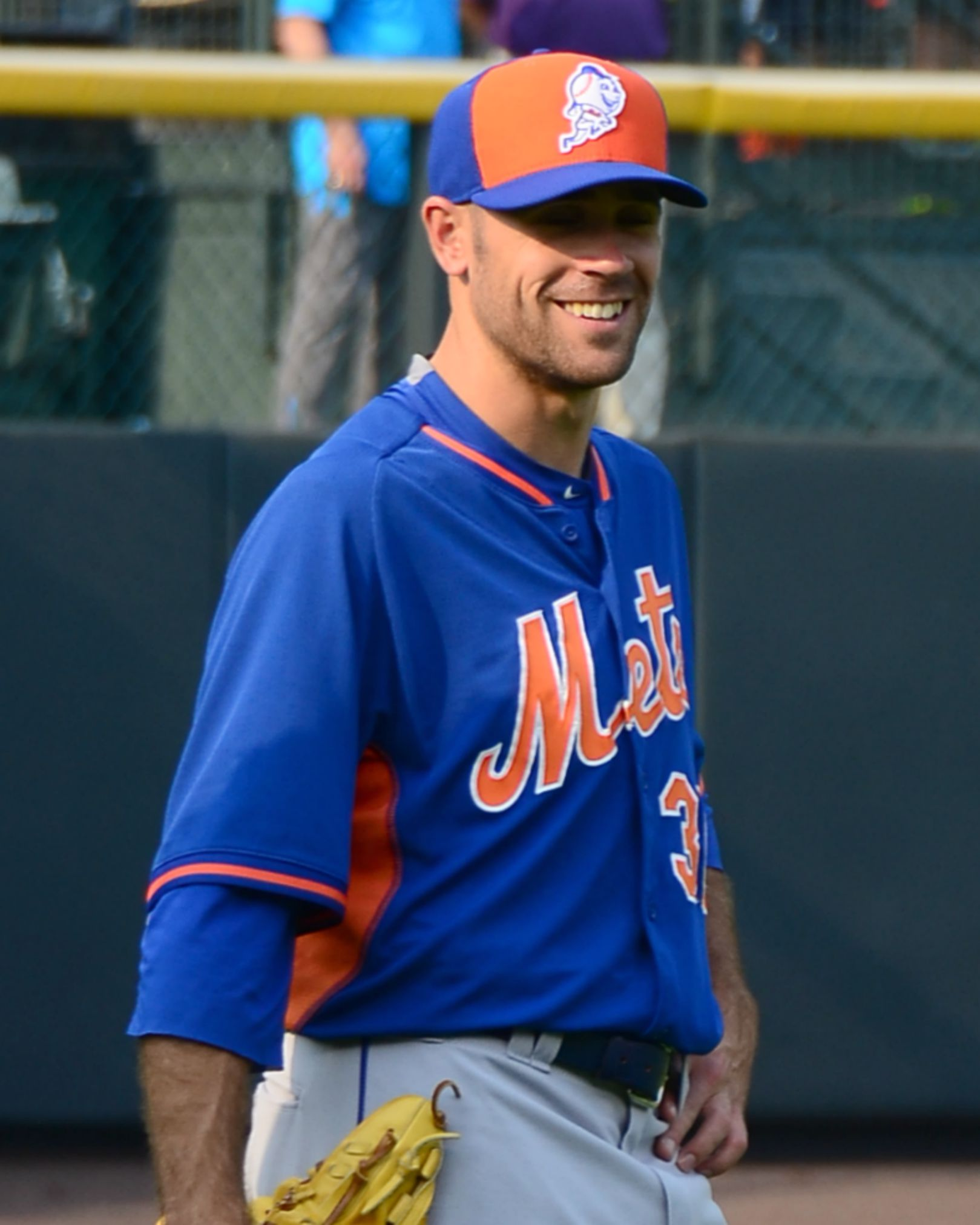
Gilmartin with the New York Mets in 2015

During the 2014 Winter Meetings, the New York Mets selected Gilmartin from the Twins in the Rule 5 draft on December 11. Gilmartin competed to make the Mets' Opening Day 25-man roster as a relief pitcher and earned a spot in the bullpen. Gilmartin made his major league debut on April 10 against the Braves in a 5–3 loss, getting Nick Markakis to ground out and striking out Freddie Freeman to end the seventh inning.

On June 14, Gilmartin got his first win, against the Braves, holding Atlanta scoreless through both the fifth and the sixth innings. He faced seven batters, walking one and striking out three, in a 10-8 Mets' victory. On July 19, Gilmartin got his first major league hit, a bloop single into left field off Carlos Martínez, in his first major league at-bat, in the sixteenth inning against the St. Louis Cardinals. Gilmartin pitched three scoreless innings, in the fourteenth, fifteenth and the sixteenth innings, giving up one hit, two walks and getting four strikeouts while facing 12 batters.

After the Mets clinched the National League East division title, Gilmartin made his first major league start on October 1 against the Philadelphia Phillies at Citizens Bank Park, throwing five innings. He struck out three batters and allowed two runs and three hits, throwing 44 of 70 pitches for strikes. He retired 11 of the first 12 batters he faced in a game that lasted just 2 hours, 23 minutes. The two runs he allowed came on Darin Ruf's two-run home run in the 4th inning. However, the Mets lost the game by a score of 3–0.

When the Mets made the playoffs, Gilmartin was not on the roster for the Division Series, but was added to the roster for the Championship Series, replacing Erik Goeddel. Gilmartin did not appear in the championship series. Gilmartin appeared in game two of the World Series in the top of the eighth inning, retiring the two batters he faced. Gilmartin finished the 2015 regular season with a record of 3–2, and a 2.67 ERA in 50 games (one start) in 57 1/3 innings pitched, with 54 strikeouts and a WHIP of 1.186, while giving up 50 hits, 17 runs, two home runs, and 19 walks.

Gilmartin was cut from the roster heading into the 2016 season. Gilmartin was recalled to the Mets on May 12, replacing an injured Wilmer Flores on the roster. With the AAA 51s, Gilmartin had pitched 32.2 innings, sporting a 4–1 record with a 2.48 ERA and 1.13 WHIP. Days later, Gilmartin was sent back down to the 51s to make room for Matt Reynolds on the roster. Gilmartin had pitched five scoreless innings in two games during his brief call-up, giving up two hits and striking out five batters.

On June 11, 2017, the Mets designated Gilmartin for assignment.

=== St. Louis Cardinals ===
On June 11, 2017, Gilmartin was claimed off waivers by the St. Louis Cardinals. He was outrighted to the Double-A Springfield Cardinals on September 1, 2017. He was released on July 2, 2018.

=== Baltimore Orioles ===
On July 12, 2018, Gilmartin signed a minor league deal with the Baltimore Orioles. He was called up to the majors on August 11, 2018. Gilmartin recorded a 3.00 ERA in 12 games for the Orioles in 2018. He was outrighted off the roster following the season and elected free agency on November 1. The following day, he re-signed with the Orioles on a minor league contract.

After starting the 2019 season in the minor leagues for the Orioles, Gilmartin had his contract selected to the majors on June 17, 2019. Gilmartin was designated for assignment on June 25, following the acquisition of Tayler Scott. He elected free agency on October 1, 2019.

=== Tampa Bay Rays ===
On February 8, 2020, Gilmartin signed a minor league deal with the Tampa Bay Rays. On August 7, Gilmartin was selected to the active roster. He was designated for assignment on August 9 and outrighted two days later. On August 22, Gilmartin was added back to the 40-man roster. Only a day after being re-added to the roster, Gilmartin was again designated for assignment by the Rays. On September 18, Gilmartin had his contract selected by the Rays for a third time. On September 29, Gilmartin was designated for assignment by the Rays for a third time. With the 2020 Tampa Bay Rays, Gilmartin appeared in two games, compiling a 0–0 record with 8.31 ERA and five strikeouts in 4.1 innings pitched. He became a free agent on November 2.

=== Long Island Ducks ===
On April 27, 2021, Gilmartin signed with the Long Island Ducks of the Atlantic League of Professional Baseball.

=== Minnesota Twins (second stint) ===
On June 29, 2021, Gilmartin's contract was purchased by the Minnesota Twins organization with a minor league contract for the Double–A Wichita Wind Surge. At age 31, he was the oldest player in the Double–A Central. In 6 games split between Wichita and the rookie-level Florida Complex League Twins, he struggled to a 14.63 ERA with 13 strikeouts in 8 innings pitched. He elected free agency following the season on November 7.

Gilmartin retired during the 2021/22 offseason.

== Personal life ==
Gilmartin is married to former White House Press Secretary Kayleigh McEnany. They began dating in 2015 and married on November 18, 2017. Their daughter was born in November 2019. In June 2022, the couple announced that they were expecting their second child. On December 1, 2022, McEnany announced the birth of their son Nash on Twitter. In 2024 she announced her third pregnancy.

Gilmartin's brother Michael was drafted by the Oakland Athletics from Wofford College as an infielder in the 27th round of the 2009 MLB draft. His cousin, Chad, previously worked in the White House Office of the Press Secretary.
