= FNB Corporation =

Diversified financial services corporation

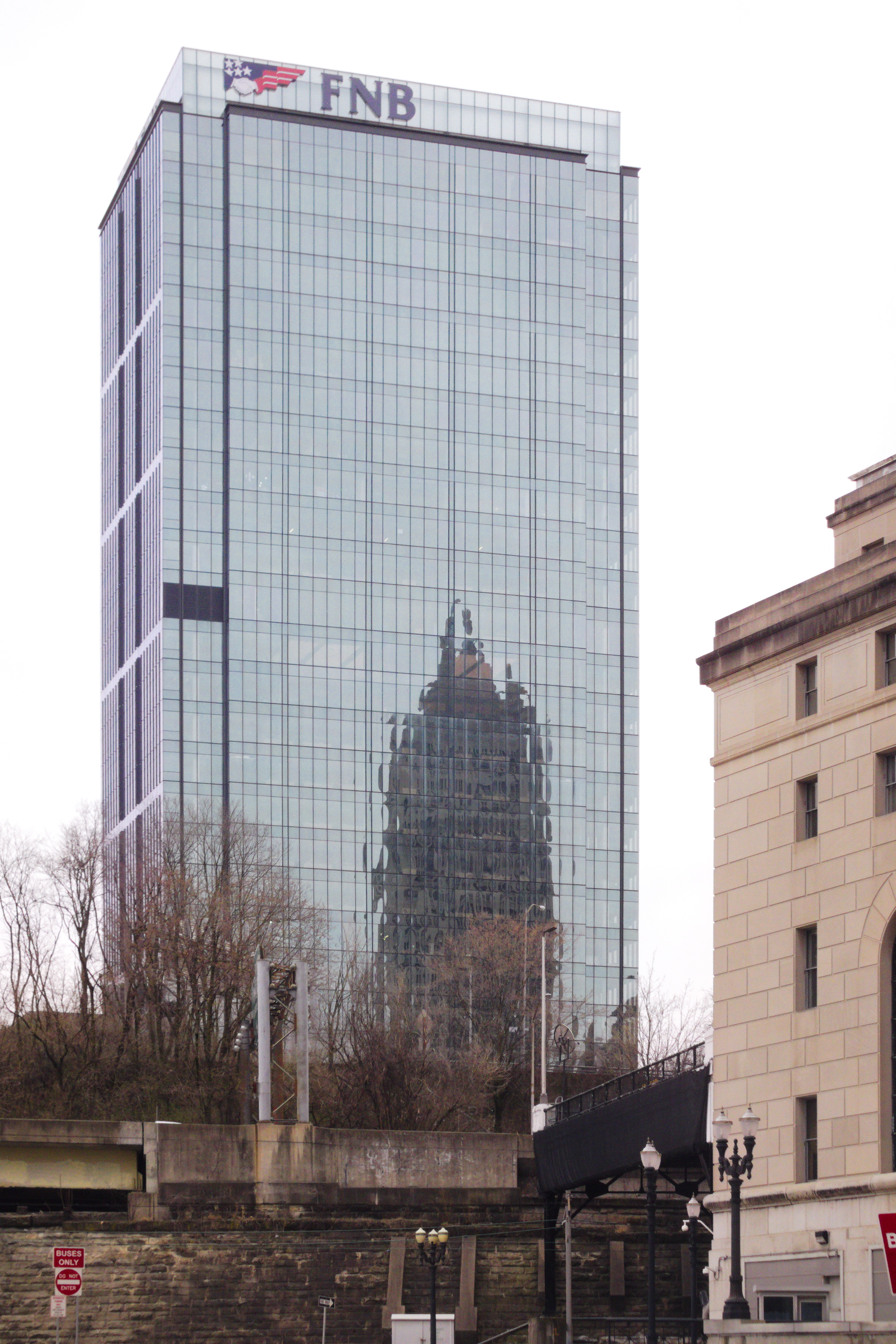
- FNB Financial Center in Pittsburgh
- Type: Public
- Traded as: NYSE: FNB; S&P 400 Component
- Industry: Banking; Financial services Investment services
- Founded: February 4, 1864; 162 years ago
- Headquarters: Pittsburgh, Pennsylvania, United States
- Area served: Ohio, Pennsylvania, Maryland, West Virginia, North Carolina, South Carolina, Virginia and Washington, D.C.
- Key people: Vincent J. Delie, Jr. (chairman, president and CEO)
- Number of employees: Approximately 4,600 total employment
- Website: https://www.fnb-online.com/

FNB Corporation is a diversified financial services corporation based in Pittsburgh, Pennsylvania, and the holding company for its largest subsidiary, First National Bank. As of September 30, 2026, FNB has total assets of $52 billion. FNB's market coverage spans several major metropolitan areas, including Pittsburgh, Pennsylvania; Baltimore, Maryland; Cleveland, Ohio; Washington, D.C.; Charlotte, Raleigh, Durham and the Piedmont Triad (Winston-Salem, Greensboro and High Point) in North Carolina; and Charleston, South Carolina, with more than 355 offices. The company has total employment of more than 4,600.

== History ==
First National Bank was founded in Mercer County, Pennsylvania, in 1864 under the name The First National Bank of West Greenville and operated out of the house of then bank president, Samuel P. Johnston, in Greenville, Pennsylvania. The bank dropped "West" from its name in the 1880s after the town did the same.

The bank remained a fixture in Mercer County through World War I, the Great Depression and World War II. In 1946, bank assets totaled approximately $2 million and the bank was still housed in one office.

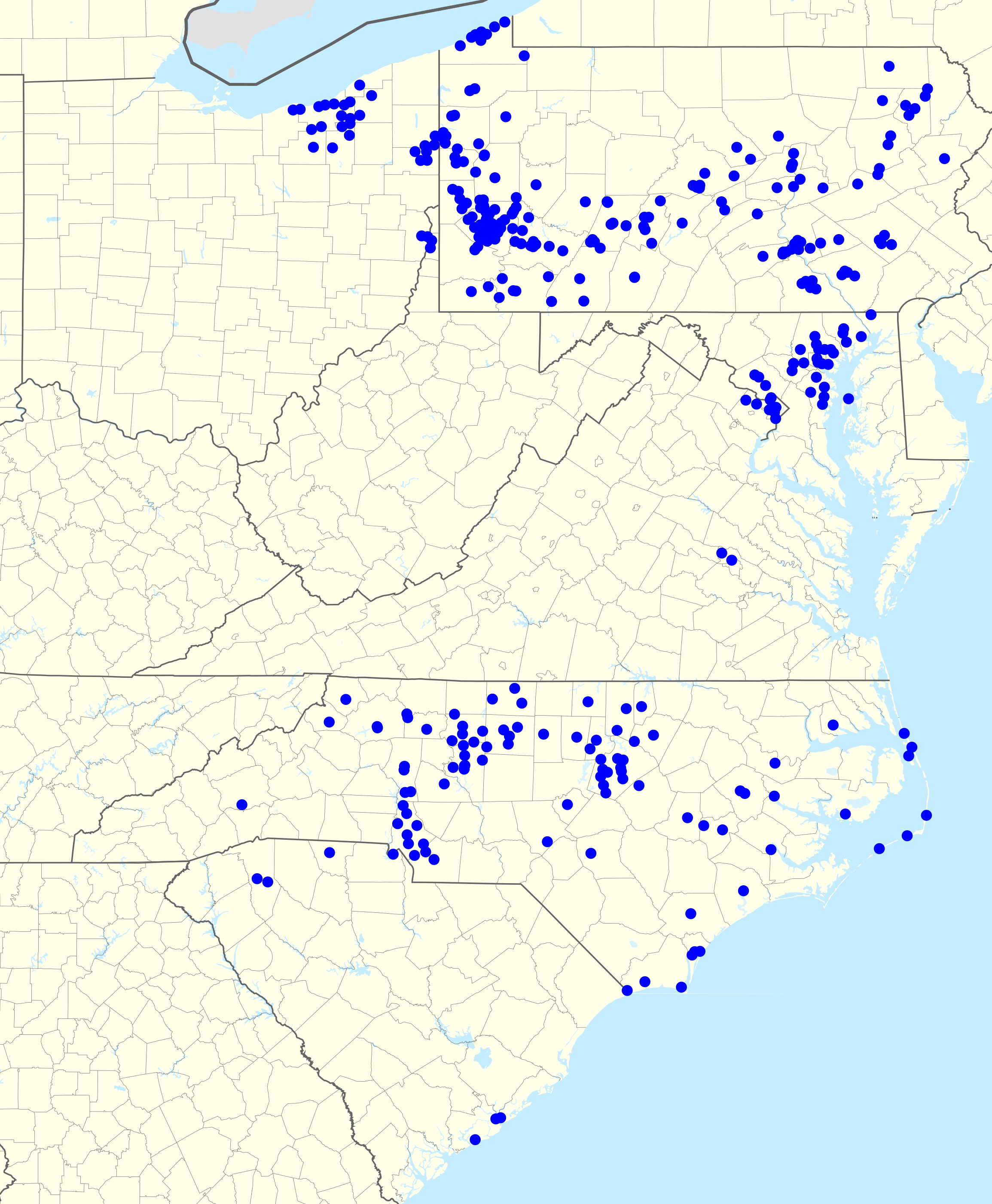
First National Bank branches as of February 2026

Across the next three decades, the bank continued to grow, and in 1974, FNB Corporation was established as a financial services holding company for a growing family of business entities which included the bank, under the name The First National Bank of Mercer County and with an asset size of $120 million, and Regency Finance Company.

Along with completing the acquisition of ten branch offices from First National Bank of Pennsylvania in July 1992, First National Bank of Mercer County acquired the name and formally changed its name to the current First National Bank of Pennsylvania. Around this time, the First National Bank of Western Pennsylvania in nearby New Castle changed its name to First Western Bank to avoid confusion; that bank is now part of Huntington Bancshares after several other mergers.

As of 2003, the company had grown to assets of $4.6 billion with more than 125 banking offices and began trading common shares on the New York Stock Exchange under the ticker symbol FNB. Today, it is included in Standard & Poor's MidCap 400 Index with the Global Industry Classification Standard (GICS) Regional Banks Sub-Industry Index.

Current chief executive officer Vincent J. Delie, Jr., joined the bank in 2005 as president of the Pittsburgh Region. Since then, the company has shown tremendous growth, both organically and through a series of major mergers. As of 2017, FNB is the second-largest bank based in Pennsylvania, measured by assets.

FNB announced its Clicks-to-Bricks strategy in 2016. In 2021, FNB launched its eStore digital banking platform. In 2024, the platform expanded with the Common app which is used for applying for multiple products and/or services at once.

== Facilities ==
In July 2014, FNB announced that Pittsburgh had officially been named the corporation's headquarters. FNB's growth in Pittsburgh has expanded from a single banking office in 1997 to nearly 100 locations and a top three retail deposit market share today. In May 2017, FNB announced its regional headquarters would locate in a 22-story building in Raleigh to be called FNB Tower. Groundbreaking took place in December 2017, and the building opened in December 2019.

In March 2018, FNB announced it would anchor a 31-story tower in Charlotte to serve as its regional headquarters named FNB Tower Charlotte. The building was completed and opened in July 2021. In December 2019, FNB announced it would move its current corporate headquarters operation in the Pittsburgh North Shore to a new 26-story building in downtown Pittsburgh's Hill District. FNB, the Pittsburgh Penguins, Clay Cove Capital and The Buccini/Pollin Group broke ground on the project on September 1, 2021. FNB moved into FNB Financial Center in November 2024 and celebrated the grand opening in February 2025.

== Acquisitions ==
FNB has acquired many other companies during its long life. Some recent examples are listed below: In 2012, FNB acquired Parkvale Savings Bank, which was based in Monroeville. In 2015, FNB acquired Metro Bank (formerly Commerce Bank) of Harrisburg. In 2016, FNB agreed to a $1.4 billion deal with Yadkin Financial of Raleigh, North Carolina, the largest deal in the company's history, giving FNB 98 branches in North Carolina. The merger was completed on March 11, 2017. In 2021, it acquired Howard Bancorp (Howard Bank) of Maryland, and the acquisition was completed on January 22, 2022.

In June 2022, FNB announced the purchase of UB Bancorp of Greenville, North Carolina, with $1.2 billion in assets and 15 Union Bank branches, for stock valued at $117 million. The deal was completed December 12.

== Leadership ==
Vincent J. Delie, Jr., is chairman, president and CEO of FNB Corporation and First National Bank. He joined FNB in 2005 as head of the Pittsburgh Region. Delie became a First National Bank Board member in 2009. In 2011, Delie became president of FNB Corporation and in 2012 he was additionally named chief executive officer and elected to the board of directors. Delie reassumed his role as president of First National Bank when John Williams retired from the position in 2015. Delie has received numerous awards and honors, including The CEO Magazine's CEO of the Year award.

Delie previously served as Executive Vice President of Corporate Banking at National City Bank. Throughout his career, he has held various leadership roles in areas within the financial services industry. He earned a degree in Finance from the College of Business at The Pennsylvania State University (Penn State), where FNB is now the official provider of retail banking and financial services.

== FNB affiliates ==
FNB Corporation operates several financial services affiliates, including:

- First National Bank of Pennsylvania, its largest subsidiary, with more than 350 offices across a seven-state footprint and Washington, D.C. (as of March 2026)
- First National Trust Company, chartered in 1934
- FNB Investment Services for individuals, corporations, and retirement funds
- FNB Investment Advisors, Inc., a registered investment adviser under the registered Investment Advisers Act of 1940 and with the Securities and Exchange Commission and Pennsylvania Securities Commission
- First National Insurance Agency, offering Property and Casualty, Employee Benefits and Life Insurance coverage
