= 2015 Kansas State Wildcats baseball team =

American college baseball season

2015 Kansas State Wildcats baseball
- Conference: Big 12 Conference
- Record: 13–14 (2–5 Big 12)
- Head coach: Brad Hill (12th season)
- Assistant coaches: Andy Sawyers (1st season); Josh Reynolds (5th season)
- Home stadium: Tointon Family Stadium

2015 Big 12 Conference baseball standings
	Conf.				Overall
Team	W		L	PCT	W		L	PCT
No. 4 TCU ‍†‍‍^{y}	18	–	5	.783	51	–	15	.773
No. 19 Oklahoma State ‍‍‍^{y}	14	–	8	.636	38	–	20	.655
Oklahoma ‍‍‍	13	–	11	.542	34	–	27	.557
Texas Tech ‍‍‍	13	–	11	.542	31	–	24	.564
Texas ‍‍‡‍^{y}	11	–	13	.458	30	–	27	.526
Kansas State ‍‍‍	10	–	14	.417	27	–	30	.474
West Virginia ‍‍‍	9	–	13	.409	27	–	27	.500
Baylor ‍‍‍	9	–	15	.375	23	–	32	.418
Kansas ‍‍‍	8	–	15	.348	23	–	32	.418
† – Conference champion ‡ – Tournament champion y – Invited to the NCAA tournament Rankings from Collegiate Baseball

The 2015 Kansas State Wildcats baseball team represented Kansas State University during the 2015 NCAA Division I baseball season. The Wildcats played their home games at Tointon Family Stadium as a member of the Big 12 Conference. They were led by head coach Brad Hill, in his 12th season at Kansas State.

== Previous season ==
In 2014, the Wildcats finished the season 9th in the Big 12 with a record of 25–30, 5–18 in conference play. They failed to qualify for the 2014 Big 12 Conference baseball tournament or the 2014 NCAA Division I baseball tournament.

== Personnel ==
=== Roster ===
2015 Kansas State Wildcats roster
Pitchers: 14 – Colton Kalmus – (redshirt) Sophomore; 20 – Lucas Benenati – Junior; 21 – Bryce Ward – Freshman; 23 – Blake McFadden – (redshirt) Sophomore; 24 – Nate Griep – (redshirt) Sophomore; 28 – Mark Biesma – Senior; 29 – Levi MaVorhis – Junior; 30 – Jordan Floyd – Sophomore; 34 – Kyle Halbohn – (redshirt) Junior; 36 – Brandon Courville – Junior; 37 – Corey Fischer – Junior; 38 – Brandon Erickson – Junior; 40 – Mitch Plassmeyer – Freshman; 44 – Jackson Douglas – Freshman; 45 – Nate Williams – (redshirt) Junior	Catchers: 8 – Steve Serratore – (redshirt) Sophomore; 10 – Alex Bee – Junior; 17 – Tyler Moore – Junior; 39 – Matt Nerz – Freshman; Infielders: 1 – Jake Wodtke – (redshirt) Sophomore; 2 – Dalon Farkas – Freshman; 4 – Trae Patterson – Sophomore; 6 – Carter Yagi – Senior; 7 – Tyler Wolfe – Junior; 13 – Ethan Klosterboer – Freshman; 15 – Shane Conlon – (redshirt) Senior	Outfielders: 5 – Clayton Dalrymple – Junior; 9 – Danny Krause – Junior; 12 – Keith Browning – Sophomore; 16 – Max Brown – Senior; 19 – Brian O'Bannon – Sophomore; 22 – Sam Chadick – Freshman; 26 – Taylor Anderson – (redshirt) Junior; 27 – Cole DuPont – Freshman; 31 – Brooks DeBord – Junior; 35 – Dominic Thornton – Freshman

=== Coaching staff ===
Name	Position	Seasons at Kansas State	Alma mater
Brad Hill	Head coach	12	Emporia State University (1985)
Andy Sawyers	Associate head coach	1	University of Nebraska–Lincoln (1998)
Josh Reynolds	Assistant coach	5	Kansas State University (2006)

== Schedule ==
Legend
	Kansas State win
	Kansas State loss
	Postponement
**Bold**	Kansas State team member

2015 Kansas State Wildcats baseball game log
Regular season
February

Date	Opponent	Rank	Site/stadium	Score	Win	Loss	Save	Attendance	Overall record	B12 Record
February 13	vs. Iowa		Charlotte Sports Park • Port Charlotte, FL	**W** 5–4	**Floyd** (1–0)	Grant (0–1)	**Halbohn** (1)	432	1–0	–
February 14	vs. Pittsburgh		North Charlotte Regional Park • Port Charlotte, FL	**W** 7–0	**MaVorhis** (1–0)	Berube (0–1)		N/A	2–0	–
February 14	vs. George Mason		North Charlotte Regional Park • Port Charlotte, FL	**L** 0–5	Williams (1–0)	**Biesma** (0–1)		N/A	2–1	–
February 15	vs. Saint Louis		North Charlotte Regional Park • Port Charlotte, FL	**L** 4–7	Plohr (1–0)	**Floyd** (1–1)		N/A	2–2	–
February 19	vs. Utah		Surprise Stadium • Surprise, AZ	**W** 3–2	**Griep** (1–0)	Drachler (0–2)		N/A	3–2	–
February 20	vs. Oregon State		Surprise Stadium • Surprise, AZ	**L** 9–10	Hickey (2–0)	**Floyd** (1–2)		2,301	3–3	–
February 21	vs. Washington		Sloan Park • Mesa, AZ	**L** 5–6 ^{(10)}	Jones (1–0)	**Halbohn** (0–1)		484	3–4	–
February 22	vs. Washington State		Sloan Park • Mesa, AZ	**W** 12–3	**Fischer** (1–0)	Leonard (0–1)		135	4–4	–
February 28	at California		Evans Diamond • Berkeley, CA	**L** 2–4	Jeffries (2–1)	**Griep** (1–1)	Nelson (1)	336	4–5	–

March

Date	Opponent	Rank	Site/stadium	Score	Win	Loss	Save	Attendance	Overall record	B12 Record
March 1	at California		Evans Diamond • Berkeley, CA	**L** 2–6	Mason (2–0)	**Kalmus** (0–1)	Muse-Fisher (2)	451	4–6	–
March 2	at California		Evans Diamond • Berkeley, CA	**L** 1–9	Ladrech (2–1)	**Fischer** (1–1)		115	4–7	–
March 6	Santa Clara		Tointon Family Stadium • Manhattan, KS	**W** 4–1	**Griep** (2–1)	Steffens (2–2)	**Erickson** (1)	2,667	5–7	–
March 7	Santa Clara		Tointon Family Stadium • Manhattan, KS	**W** 17–5	**Floyd** (2–2)	Wilson (1–1)		2,387	6–7	–
March 8	Santa Clara		Tointon Family Stadium • Manhattan, KS	**W** 10–3	**Douglas** (1–0)	George (1–1)		2,331	7–7	–
March 10	Creighton		Tointon Family Stadium • Manhattan, KS	**W** 10–5	**Halbohn** (1–1)	Elman (0–1)		2,520	8–7	–
March 11	Creighton		Tointon Family Stadium • Manhattan, KS	**L** 3–6	DeCaster (1–0)	**Douglas** (1–1)		2,203	8–8	–
March 13	Missouri State		Tointon Family Stadium • Manhattan, KS	**W** 4–0	**Griep** (3–1)	Hall (3–1)		2,849	9–8	–
March 14	Missouri State		Tointon Family Stadium • Manhattan, KS	**W** 10–6	**Douglas** (2–1)	Cheray (2–2)		2,410	10–8	–
March 15	Missouri State		Tointon Family Stadium • Manhattan, KS	**L** 7–10	Young (1–0)	**Erickson** (0–1)		2,660	10–9	–
March 17	at Stephen F. Austin		Jaycees Field • Nacogdoches, TX	**W** 3–2	**Halbohn** (2–1)	Stone (0–1)	**Erickson** (2)	150	11–9	–
March 18	at Stephen F. Austin		Jaycees Field • Nacogdoches, TX	Cancelled						
March 21	at Texas		UFCU Disch–Falk Field • Austin, TX	**L** 3–5	Bellow (2–1)	**Courville** (0–1)	Culbreth (3)	5,372	11–10	0–1
March 21	at Texas		UFCU Disch–Falk Field • Austin, TX	**L** 1–3	Hollingsworth (3–1)	**Calmus** (0–2)	Bellow (2)	5,372	11–11	0–2
March 22	at Texas		UFCU Disch–Falk Field • Austin, TX	**L** 1–6	Clemens (2–1)	**Fischer** (1–2)	Mayes (1)	5,695	11–12	0–3
March 25	Omaha		Tointon Family Stadium • Manhattan, KS	Postponed						
March 27	at Oklahoma State		Allie P. Reynolds Stadium • Stillwater, OK	**W** 4–2	**Fischer** (2–2)	Perrin (2–3)		1,404	12–12	1–3
March 28	at Oklahoma State		Allie P. Reynolds Stadium • Stillwater, OK	**L** 3–12	Buffett (2–1)	**Halbohn** (2–2)		2,224	12–13	1–4
March 29	at Oklahoma State		Allie P. Reynolds Stadium • Stillwater, OK	**L** 1–4	Freeman (5–0)	**Fischer** (2–3)		1,802	12–14	1–5

April

Date	Opponent	Rank	Site/stadium	Score	Win	Loss	Save	Attendance	Overall record	B12 Record
April 2	West Virginia		Tointon Family Stadium • Manhattan, KS	**W** 8–2	**Fischer** (3–3)	Dotson (0–3)		2,737	13–14	2–5
April 3	West Virginia		Tointon Family Stadium • Manhattan, KS							
April 4	West Virginia		Tointon Family Stadium • Manhattan, KS							
April 7	Nebraska		Tointon Family Stadium • Manhattan, KS							
April 8	at Omaha		Werner Park • Papillion, NE							
April 10	TCU		Tointon Family Stadium • Manhattan, KS							
April 11	TCU		Tointon Family Stadium • Manhattan, KS							
April 12	TCU		Tointon Family Stadium • Manhattan, KS							
April 14	Wichita State		Tointon Family Stadium • Manhattan, KS							
April 17	Texas Tech		Tointon Family Stadium • Manhattan, KS							
April 18	Texas Tech		Tointon Family Stadium • Manhattan, KS							
April 19	Texas Tech		Tointon Family Stadium • Manhattan, KS							
April 21	at Nebraska		Haymarket Park • Lincoln, NE							
April 24	at Baylor		Baylor Ballpark • Waco, TX							
April 25	at Baylor		Baylor Ballpark • Waco, TX							
April 26	at Baylor		Baylor Ballpark • Waco, TX							
April 28	at Minnesota		Siebert Field • Minneapolis, MN							
April 29	at Minnesota		Siebert Field • Minneapolis, MN							

May

Date	Opponent	Rank	Site/stadium	Score	Win	Loss	Save	Attendance	Overall record	B12 Record
May 1	Arkansas State		Tointon Family Stadium • Manhattan, KS							
May 2	Arkansas State		Tointon Family Stadium • Manhattan, KS							
May 3	Arkansas State		Tointon Family Stadium • Manhattan, KS							
May 5	at Wichita State		Eck Stadium • Wichita, KS							
May 8	Oklahoma		Tointon Family Stadium • Manhattan, KS							
May 9	Oklahoma		Tointon Family Stadium • Manhattan, KS							
May 10	Oklahoma		Tointon Family Stadium • Manhattan, KS							
May 15	at Kansas		Hoglund Ballpark • Lawrence, KS							
May 16	at Kansas		Hoglund Ballpark • Lawrence, KS							
May 17	at Kansas		Hoglund Ballpark • Lawrence, KS							

Postseason
Big 12 Tournament

Date	Opponent	Rank	Site/stadium	Score	Win	Loss	Save	Attendance	Overall record	B12 Record
	TBD		ONEOK Field • Tulsa, OK							
	TBD		ONEOK Field • Tulsa, OK							

All rankings from Collegiate Baseball.
