= 2015 Baylor Bears baseball team =

American college baseball season

2015 Baylor Bears baseball
- Conference: Big 12 Conference
- Record: 13–22 (4–8 Big 12)
- Head coach: Steve Smith (21st season)
- Assistant coaches: Steve Johnigan (20th season); Trevor Mote (7th season)
- Home stadium: Baylor Ballpark

2015 Big 12 Conference baseball standings
	Conf.				Overall
Team	W		L	PCT	W		L	PCT
No. 4 TCU ‍†‍‍^{y}	18	–	5	.783	51	–	15	.773
No. 19 Oklahoma State ‍‍‍^{y}	14	–	8	.636	38	–	20	.655
Oklahoma ‍‍‍	13	–	11	.542	34	–	27	.557
Texas Tech ‍‍‍	13	–	11	.542	31	–	24	.564
Texas ‍‍‡‍^{y}	11	–	13	.458	30	–	27	.526
Kansas State ‍‍‍	10	–	14	.417	27	–	30	.474
West Virginia ‍‍‍	9	–	13	.409	27	–	27	.500
Baylor ‍‍‍	9	–	15	.375	23	–	32	.418
Kansas ‍‍‍	8	–	15	.348	23	–	32	.418
† – Conference champion ‡ – Tournament champion y – Invited to the NCAA tournament Rankings from Collegiate Baseball

The 2015 Baylor Bears baseball team represented Baylor University during the 2015 NCAA Division I baseball season. The Bears played their home games at Baylor Ballpark as a member of the Big 12 Conference. They were led by head coach Steve Smith, in his 21st season at Baylor.

== Previous season ==
In 2014, the Bears finished the season 7th in the Big 12 with a record of 26–31, 8–15 in conference play. They qualified for the 2014 Big 12 Conference baseball tournament and were eliminated in the semifinals. They failed to qualify for the 2014 NCAA Division I baseball tournament.

== Personnel ==
=== Roster ===
2015 Baylor Bears roster
Pitchers: 3 – Nick Lewis – Sophomore; 6 – Ryan Smith – Junior; 10 – Austin Stone – Senior; 11 – Brad Kuntz – Senior; 12 – Joe Kirkland – Senior; 20 – Daniel Castano – Sophomore; 22 – Hunter Abbe – (redshirt) Sophomore; 26 – Kody Hessemer – Junior; 27 – Drew Tolson – Sophomore; 28 – Blake Allen – Freshman; 31 – Hudson Pearson – Freshman; 33 – Theron Kay – Freshman; 35 – Kyle Ott – (redshirt) Freshman; 36 – Troy Montemayor – Freshman; 44 – Sean Spicer – Senior; 46 – Reese Jefferies – Junior; 54 – Dylan Johannik – Junior	Catchers: 13 – Joe Sabatini – Sophomore; 19 – Aaron Dodson – Sophomore; 23 – Matt Menard – Sophomore; 32 – Cameron Miller – (redshirt) Freshman; Infielders: 1 – Justin Arrington – Junior; 2 – Steven McLean – (redshirt) Freshman; 5 – Duncan Wendel – Senior; 9 – West Tunnell – Junior; 26 – Ben Carl – (redshirt) Freshman; 37 – Johnathan Ducoff – Freshman; 39 – Garrett Prossner – Freshman; 45 – Hayden Ross – Sophomore	Outfielders: 4 – Darryn Sheppard – Sophomore; 8 – Levi Gilcrease – Freshman; 15 – Adam Toth – Senior; 16 – Logan Brown – Senior; 21 – Richard Cunningham – Freshman; 29 – Ryan Romo – Sophomore; 38 – Lane Kelly – Sophomore

=== Coaching staff ===
Name	Position	Seasons at Baylor	Alma mater
Steve Smith	Head coach	21	Baylor University (1986)
Steve Johnigan	Associate head coach	19	Texas A&M University (1989)
Trevor Mote	Assistant coach	5	Baylor University (2004)

== Season ==
=== February ===
Baylor opened its season on February 13 as part of a three-game series with Cal Poly. In game 1, the Mustangs outhit the Bears 12–7, but Baylor won 8–6. In the second game of the series, the Bears also won by a score of 8–6, and closed out the series sweep with a 6–0 win in the series finale. Baylor moved into the Collegiate Baseball Newspaper poll at #21 nationally following the Cal Poly sweep. Playing as the #21 team in the country, Baylor went 2–2 over the next week. After a midweek loss to Dallas Baptist in which the Bears pitching surrendered eight walks, the Bears dropped the first game of a three-game weekend series to 2014 NCAA Tournament participant Kent State. On February 21, the Bears swept the Golden Flashes in a doubleheader, winning the two games by a combined score of 10–4.

For the final week of February (and the first day of March), the Bears fell to #25 nationally in the Collegiate Baseball poll and were also ranked number 28 in the NCBWA poll. On February 25, the Bears defeated Northwestern State in a game that had been pushed back one day due to inclement weather. Starter Theron Kay allowed no runs over five innings pitched. On the weekend of February 27, the Bears travelled to Fullerton, California to face Cal State Fullerton, a team that had been ranked in the national polls in the early portion of the season. The Bears were swept over a 3-game series by the Titans, one in which Bears pitching allowed 28 runs.

== Schedule ==
Legend
	Baylor win
	Baylor loss
	Postponement
**Bold**	Baylor team member

2015 Baylor Bears baseball game log
Regular season
February

Date	Opponent	Rank	Site/stadium	Score	Win	Loss	Save	Attendance	Overall record	B12 Record
February 13	#13 Cal Poly		Baylor Ballpark • Waco, TX	**W** 8–6	**Lewis** (1–0)	Zandona (0–1)	**Spicer** (1)	2,834	1–0	–
February 14	#13 Cal Poly		Baylor Ballpark • Waco, TX	**W** 8–6	**Kirkland** (1–0)	Smith (0–1)	**Spicer** (2)	2,835	2–0	–
February 15	#13 Cal Poly		Baylor Ballpark • Waco, TX	**W** 6–0	**Kay** (1–0)	Calomeni (0–1)	**Castano** (1)	2,380	3–0	–
February 17	Dallas Baptist	#21	Baylor Ballpark • Waco, TX	**L** 6–9	Adams (2–0)	**Montemayor** (0–1)	Koch (1)	2,052	3–1	–
February 20	Kent State	#21	Baylor Ballpark • Waco, TX	**L** 3–11	Jensen-Clagg (1–1)	**Castano** (0–1)		2,220	3–2	–
February 21	Kent State	#21	Baylor Ballpark • Waco, TX	**W** 6–1	**Kirkland** (2–0)	Skolnicki (1–1)		2,189	4–2	–
February 21	Kent State	#21	Baylor Ballpark • Waco, TX	**W** 4–3 ^{(10)}	**Spicer** (1–0)	Pierce (0–1)		2,986	5–2	–
February 24	Northwestern State		Baylor Ballpark • Waco, TX	Cancelled						
February 25	Northwestern State	#25	Baylor Ballpark • Waco, TX	**W** 8–4	**Kay** (2–0)	Tidwell (0–2)		1,854	6–2	–
February 27	at Cal State Fullerton	#25	Goodwin Field • Fullerton, CA	**L** 1–10	Eshelman (1–2)	**Tolson** (0–1)		1,422	6–3	–
February 28	at Cal State Fullerton	#25	Goodwin Field • Fullerton, CA	**L** 6–11	Seabold (1–0)	**Kirkland** (2–1)		1,422	6–4	–

March

Date	Opponent	Rank	Site/stadium	Score	Win	Loss	Save	Attendance	Overall record	B12 Record
March 1	at Cal State Fullerton	#25	Goodwin Field • Fullerton, CA	**L** 6–7	Kuhl (1–0)	**Montemayor** (0–2)	Peitzmeier (3)	1,184	6–5	–
March 4	Sam Houston State		Baylor Ballpark • Waco, TX	Postponed Rescheduled for March 18						
March 6	vs. Hawaii		Minute Maid Park • Houston, TX	**L** 1–2	Brewster (3–1)	**Tolson** (0–2)	Culp (3)	503	6–6	–
March 7	vs. #3 LSU		Minute Maid Park • Houston, TX	**L** 0–2	Lange (4–0)	**Castano** (0–2)	Stallings (7)	3,343	6–7	–
March 8	vs. #11 Texas A&M		Minute Maid Park • Houston, TX	**L** 2–3	Kent (4–0)	**Stone** (0–1)	Hendrix (4)	4,589	6–8	–
March 10	at Dallas Baptist		Horner Ballpark • Houston, TX	**L** 3–17	Smith (2–1)	**Kay** (2–1)		1,102	6–9	–
March 13	at #1 TCU		Lupton Stadium • Fort Worth, TX	**L** 1–3	Traver (3–0)	**Tolson** (0–3)	Ferrell (6)	4,018	6–10	0–1
March 14	at #1 TCU		Lupton Stadium • Fort Worth, TX	**L** 2–3	Morrison (4–0)	**Castano** (0–3)	Ferrell (7)	4,259	6–11	0–2
March 15	at #1 TCU		Lupton Stadium • Fort Worth, TX	**L** 1–10	Young (4–0)	**Stone** (0–2)		4,323	6–12	0–3
March 17	at Sam Houston State		Don Sanders Stadium • Huntsville, TX	**W** 4–3 ^{(10)}	**Castano** (1–3)	Church (0–1)		1,729	7–12	–
March 18	Sam Houston State		Baylor Ballpark • Waco, TX	**L** 3–4	Ebbs (3–1)	**Tolson** (0–4)	Odom (1)	1,789	7–13	–
March 20	West Virginia		Baylor Ballpark • Waco, TX	**W** 5–4	**Kirkland** (3–1)	Dotson (0–2)	**Spicer** (3)	1,906	8–13	1–3
March 21	West Virginia		Baylor Ballpark • Waco, TX	**W** 10–4	**Hessemer** (1–0)	Vance (2–2)		2,239	9–13	2–3
March 22	West Virginia		Baylor Ballpark • Waco, TX	**L** 2–8	Donato (3–3)	**Tolson** (0–5)		2,172	9–14	2–4
March 24	at Texas–Arlington		Clay Gould Ballpark • Arlington, TX	**W** 6–2	**Kay** (3–1)	Laberge (1–3)		480	10–14	–
March 27	Oklahoma		Baylor Ballpark • Waco, TX	**W** 3–0	**Castano** (2–3)	Elliott (3–3)		2,495	11–14	3–4
March 28	Oklahoma		Baylor Ballpark • Waco, TX	**W** 7–2	**Tolson** (1–5)	Hansen (3–3)		3,446	12–14	4–4
March 29	Oklahoma		Baylor Ballpark • Waco, TX	**L** 3–13	Tasin (5–1)	**Hessemer** (1–1)		2,435	12–15	4–5
March 31	#14 Houston		Baylor Ballpark • Waco, TX	**L** 0–11	Longville (2–2)	**Kay** (3–2)		2,104	12–16	–

April

Date	Opponent	Rank	Site/stadium	Score	Win	Loss	Save	Attendance	Overall record	B12 Record
April 2	at Texas State		Bobcat Ballpark • San Marcos, TX	**L** 8–9 ^{(10)}	Powell (2–3)	**Spicer** (1–1)		1,808	12–17	–
April 3	Texas State		Baylor Ballpark • Waco, TX	**L** 0–5	Grist (2–2)	**Tolson** (1–6)		2,157	12–18	–
April 4	Texas State		Baylor Ballpark • Waco, TX	**L** 1–4	Hallonquist (2–1)	**Kay** (3–3)		2,539	12–19	–
April 7	Texas–Arlington		Baylor Ballpark • Waco, TX	**W** 10–7	**Hessemer** (2–1)	Hobbs (1–2)	**Spicer** (4)	2,224	13–19	–
April 10	at Texas Tech		Rip Griffin Park • Lubbock, TX	**L** 4–8	Moseley (3–3)	**Castano** (2–4)		3,974	13–20	4–6
April 11	at Texas Tech		Rip Griffin Park • Lubbock, TX	**L** 2–3 ^{(12)}	Moreno (2–3)	**Montemayor** (0–3)		4,387	13–21	4–7
April 12	at Texas Tech		Rip Griffin Park • Lubbock, TX	**L** 5–9	Damron (3–2)	**Lewis** (1–1)		3,573	13–22	4–8
April 14	Incarnate Word		Baylor Ballpark • Waco, TX							
April 17	at Oklahoma State		Allie P. Reynolds Stadium • Stillwater, OK							
April 18	at Oklahoma State		Allie P. Reynolds Stadium • Stillwater, OK							
April 19	at Oklahoma State		Allie P. Reynolds Stadium • Stillwater, OK							
April 21	Lamar		Baylor Ballpark • Waco, TX							
April 24	Kansas State		Baylor Ballpark • Waco, TX							
April 25	Kansas State		Baylor Ballpark • Waco, TX							
April 26	Kansas State		Baylor Ballpark • Waco, TX							
April 28	at UTSA		Roadrunner Field • San Antonio, TX							

May

Date	Opponent	Rank	Site/stadium	Score	Win	Loss	Save	Attendance	Overall record	B12 Record
May 1	at Kansas		Hoglund Ballpark • Lawrence, KS							
May 2	at Kansas		Hoglund Ballpark • Lawrence, KS							
May 3	at Kansas		Hoglund Ballpark • Lawrence, KS							
May 12	UTSA		Baylor Ballpark • Waco, TX							
May 16	Texas		Baylor Ballpark • Waco, TX							
May 17	Texas		Baylor Ballpark • Waco, TX							
May 17	Texas		Baylor Ballpark • Waco, TX							

Postseason
Big 12 Tournament

Date	Opponent	Rank	Site/stadium	Score	Win	Loss	Save	Attendance	Overall record	B12 Record
	TBD		ONEOK Field • Tulsa, OK							
	TBD		ONEOK Field • Tulsa, OK							

All rankings from Collegiate Baseball.

== Rankings ==
Ranking movements Legend: ██ Increase in ranking ██ Decrease in ranking — = Not ranked RV = Received votes
	Week																		
Poll	Pre	1	2	3	4	5	6	7	8	9	10	11	12	13	14	15	16	17	Final
Coaches'	—	—*	—	—	—	—	—	—	—										
Baseball America	—	—	—	—	—	—	—	—	—										
Collegiate Baseball^	—	21	25	—	—	—	—	—	—										
NCBWA†	—	27	28	RV	—	—	—	—	—										

^ Collegiate Baseball ranked 40 teams in their preseason poll, but only ranked 30 teams weekly during the season.
† NCBWA ranks 30 teams in their preseason poll, but only ranks 25 teams weekly during the season.
* A new poll was not released for this week, so for comparison purposes, the previous week's ranking is inserted in this week's slot.
