= 2015 West Virginia Mountaineers baseball team =

American college baseball season

2015 West Virginia Mountaineers baseball
- Conference: Big 12 Conference
- Record: 27–27 (9–13 Big 12)
- Head coach: Randy Mazey (3rd season)
- Assistant coaches: Derek Matlock (3rd season); Steven Trout (3rd season); Trevor Durham (1st season)
- Home stadium: Monongalia County Ballpark

2015 Big 12 Conference baseball standings
	Conf.				Overall
Team	W		L	PCT	W		L	PCT
No. 4 TCU ‍†‍‍^{y}	18	–	5	.783	51	–	15	.773
No. 19 Oklahoma State ‍‍‍^{y}	14	–	8	.636	38	–	20	.655
Oklahoma ‍‍‍	13	–	11	.542	34	–	27	.557
Texas Tech ‍‍‍	13	–	11	.542	31	–	24	.564
Texas ‍‍‡‍^{y}	11	–	13	.458	30	–	27	.526
Kansas State ‍‍‍	10	–	14	.417	27	–	30	.474
West Virginia ‍‍‍	9	–	13	.409	27	–	27	.500
Baylor ‍‍‍	9	–	15	.375	23	–	32	.418
Kansas ‍‍‍	8	–	15	.348	23	–	32	.418
† – Conference champion ‡ – Tournament champion y – Invited to the NCAA tournament Rankings from Collegiate Baseball

The 2015 West Virginia Mountaineers baseball team represented West Virginia University during the 2015 NCAA Division I baseball season. The Mountaineers played their home games at the newly constructed Monongalia County Ballpark as a member of the Big 12 Conference. They were led by head coach Randy Mazey, in his 3rd season at West Virginia.

== Previous season ==
In 2014, the Mountaineers finished the season 6th in the Big 12 with a record of 28–26, 9–14 in conference play. They qualified for the 2014 Big 12 Conference baseball tournament and were eliminated in the second round. They failed to qualify for the 2014 NCAA Division I baseball tournament.

== New Venue ==
In June 2013, the West Virginia University Board of Governors approved a deal that would allow the baseball program to build a new stadium near the university's location of Morgantown. Ground broke on October 17, 2013, at the University Town Centre in nearby Granville. The first game at the venue is scheduled for March 17 against Waynesburg. After the college baseball season is over, the ballpark will be used by the West Virginia Black Bears, a Class A short-season affiliate of the Pittsburgh Pirates. The Black Bears relocated from Jamestown, New York, after the 2014 season.

== Personnel ==
=== Roster ===
2015 West Virginia Mountaineers roster
Pitchers: 2 - Chad Donato - Sophomore; 5 - Brandon Boone - Sophomore; 7 - Jake Danner - Freshman; 10 - Jordan Sergent - (redshirt) Freshman; 11 - Nick Wernke - (redshirt) Freshman; 12 - Shay Phillips - (redshirt) Freshman; 15 - Conner Dotson - Freshman; 17 - Connor McMann - Freshman; 18 - Ross Vance - (redshirt) Junior; 24 - Josh Bornstein - (redshirt) Sophomore; 26 - Shane Ennis - Freshman; 27 - Jeff Hardy - Junior; 28 - Alec Horvath - (redshirt) Junior; 30 - Adam Keller - Freshman; 33 - BJ Myers - Freshman; 34 - Seth Jordan - Freshman; 36 - Blake Smith - Junior; 43 - Dimitri Casas - (redshirt) Freshman; 55 - Jackson Sigman - Sophomore	Catchers: 22 - Cameron O'Brien - Senior; 42 - Ray Guerrini - (redshirt) Sophomore; Infielders: 3 - Taylor Munden - Senior; 6 - Jimmy Galusky - Freshman; 8 - Shaun Corso - (redshirt) Freshman; 13 - Jackson Cramer - Sophomore; 19 - Kyle Casserly - Freshman; 21 - Justin Fox - Senior; 25 - Brad Johnson - (redshirt) Senior; 31 - Tucker Cascadden - Freshman; 32 - Kyle Davis - Freshman; 44 - Shaun Wood - (redshirt) Sophomore	Outfielders: 1 - KC Huth - (redshirt) Junior; 4 - Tony Strasiser - (redshirt) Freshman; 20 - Caleb Potter - Freshman

=== Coaching staff ===
Name	Position	Seasons at West Virginia	Alma mater
Randy Mazey	Head coach	3	Clemson University (1988)
Derek Matlock	Assistant coach	3	University of Texas at Arlington (1990)
Steven Trout	Assistant coach	3	Texas Christian University (2007)

== Season ==
=== February ===
West Virginia opened their season with a three-game series against Clemson on the road at Doug Kingsmore Stadium. In game one of the series, freshman B. J. Myers (five innings) and junior Blake Smith (four innings) combined to shutout the Tigers, 2–0.

== Schedule ==
Legend
	West Virginia win
	West Virginia loss
	Postponement
**Bold**	West Virginia team member

2015 West Virginia Mountaineers baseball game log
Regular season
February

Date	Opponent	Rank	Site/stadium	Score	Win	Loss	Save	Attendance	Overall record	B12 Record
February 13	at #24 Clemson		Doug Kingsmore Stadium • Clemson, SC	2–0	**Smith** (1–0)	Bostic (0–1)		4,890	1–0	–
February 14	at #24 Clemson		Doug Kingsmore Stadium • Clemson, SC	2–4	Erwin (1–0)	**Vance** (0–1)	Moyer (1)		1–1	–
February 15	at #24 Clemson		Doug Kingsmore Stadium • Clemson, SC	6–1	**Donato** (1–0)	Koerner (0–1)			2–1	–
February 20	at Georgia Southern		J. I. Clements Stadium • Statesboro, GA	4–7	Pressey (1–0)	**Keller** (0–1)	Brown (2)		2–2	–
February 21	at Georgia Southern		J. I. Clements Stadium • Statesboro, GA	12–4	**Vance** (1–1)	Kelly (0–1)			3–2	–
February 22	at Georgia Southern		J. I. Clements Stadium • Statesboro, GA	2–15	Simmons (0–1)	**Donato** (1–1)			3–3	–
February 27	vs. Kent State		Springs Brooks Stadium • Conway, SC	2–5	Jensen-Clagg (2–1)	**Myers** (0–1)			3–4	–
February 27	at Coastal Carolina		Springs Brooks Stadium • Conway, SC	3–4 (13 innings)	Beckwith (1–0)	**Dotson** (0–1)			3–5	–
February 28	vs. Ball State		TicketReturn.com Field • Myrtle Beach, SC	7–6	**Hardy** (1–0)	Henderson (0–1)	**Wernke** (1)		4–5	–

March

Date	Opponent	Rank	Site/stadium	Score	Win	Loss	Save	Attendance	Overall record	B12 Record
March 1	vs. #25 Illinois		TicketReturn.com Field • Myrtle Beach, SC	1–2	Mamlic (1–0)	**Donato** (1–2)	Roper (1)		4–6	–
March 6	at East Tennessee State		Thomas Stadium • Johnson City, TN	7–6	**Smith** (2–0)	Cate (0–1)			5–6	–
March 7	at East Tennessee State		Thomas Stadium • Johnson City, TN	18–2	**Vance** (2–1)	Haeberle (2–2)			6–6	–
March 8	at East Tennessee State		Thomas Stadium • Johnson City, TN	13-4	**Donato** (2–2)	Krieg (1–1)			7–6	–
March 10	at Liberty		Liberty Baseball Stadium • Lynchburg, VA						7–6	–
March 13	at #16 Texas		UFCU Disch–Falk Field • Austin, TX	3–4 (10 innings)					7–7	0-1
March 14	at #16 Texas		UFCU Disch–Falk Field • Austin, TX	7–6 (10 innings)					8–7	1-1
March 15	at #16 Texas		UFCU Disch–Falk Field • Austin, TX	1–5					8–8	1-2
March 17	Waynesburg		CONSOL Energy Ballpark • Washington, PA	14–9					9–8	1-2
March 20	at Baylor		Baylor Ballpark • Waco, TX	4–5					9–9	1-3
March 21	at Baylor		Baylor Ballpark • Waco, TX	4–10					9–10	1-4
March 22	at Baylor		Baylor Ballpark • Waco, TX	8–2					10–10	2-4
March 24	at Stephen F. Austin		Jaycees Field • Nacogdoches, TX	14–5					11–10	2-4
March 25	at Texas–Arlington		Clay Gould Ballpark • Arlington, TX	6–4					12–10	2-4
March 27	Charleston Southern		CONSOL Energy Ballpark • Washington, PA	9–2					13–10	2-4
March 28	Charleston Southern		CONSOL Energy Ballpark • Washington, PA	9–2					14–10	2-4
March 29	Charleston Southern		CONSOL Energy Ballpark • Washington, PA	8–0					15–10	2-4
March 31	at Pittsburgh		Charles L. Cost Field • Pittsburgh, PA	4–1					16–10	2-4

April

Date	Opponent	Rank	Site/stadium	Score	Win	Loss	Save	Attendance	Overall record	B12 Record
April 2	at Kansas State		Tointon Family Stadium • Manhattan, KS	2–8					16–11	2-5
April 3	at Kansas State		Tointon Family Stadium • Manhattan, KS	5–3					17–11	3-5
April 4	at Kansas State		Tointon Family Stadium • Manhattan, KS	3–2					18–11	4-5
April 7	at #17 Maryland		Shipley Field • College Park, MD	7–12					18–12	4-5
April 10	Butler		Monongalia County Ballpark • Granville, WV	6–5 (13 innings)				3,110	19–12	4-5
April 11	Butler		Monongalia County Ballpark • Granville, WV	8–0				2,211	20–12	4-5
April 12	Butler		Monongalia County Ballpark • Granville, WV	12–4				1,647	21–12	4-5
April 14	Penn State		Monongalia County Ballpark • Granville, WV	3–5					21–13	4-5
April 17	#23 Oklahoma		Monongalia County Ballpark • Granville, WV	0–2				1,719	21–14	4-6
April 18	#23 Oklahoma		Monongalia County Ballpark • Granville, WV	6–5				2,871	22–14	5-6
April 19	#23 Oklahoma		Monongalia County Ballpark • Granville, WV	2–10					22–15	5-7
April 21	Marshall		Monongalia County Ballpark • Granville, WV	3–2					23–15	5-7
April 24	Kansas		Monongalia County Ballpark • Granville, WV	1–3					23–16	5-8
April 25	Kansas		Monongalia County Ballpark • Granville, WV	5–9					23–17	5-9
April 26	Kansas		Monongalia County Ballpark • Granville, WV	5–4				1,503	24–17	6-9
April 28	vs. Marshall		Appalachian Power Park • Charleston, WV	2–3				2,263	24–18	6-9
April 29	vs. Radford		RU Baseball Stadium • Radford, VA	4–9					24–19	6-9

May

Date	Opponent	Rank	Site/stadium	Score	Win	Loss	Save	Attendance	Overall record	B12 Record
May 1	#4 TCU		Monongalia County Ballpark • Granville, WV	4–9				2,541	24–20	6-10
May 2	#4 TCU		Monongalia County Ballpark • Granville, WV	2–6				2,107	24–21	6-11
May 3	#4 TCU		Monongalia County Ballpark • Granville, WV	0–5				1,691	24–22	6-12
May 5	at Virginia Tech		English Field • Blacksburg, VA	3–13					24–23	6-12
May 8	at #11 Oklahoma State		Allie P. Reynolds Stadium • Stillwater, OK	5–4					25–23	7-12
May 9	at #11 Oklahoma State		Allie P. Reynolds Stadium • Stillwater, OK						25–23	7-12
May 10	at #11 Oklahoma State		Allie P. Reynolds Stadium • Stillwater, OK						25–23	7-12
May 12	Pittsburgh		Monongalia County Ballpark • Granville, WV	1–4				3,037	25–24	7-12
May 14	Texas Tech		Monongalia County Ballpark • Granville, WV	6–4					26–24	8-12
May 15	Texas Tech		Monongalia County Ballpark • Granville, WV	8–2				1,883	27–24	9-12
May 16	Texas Tech		Monongalia County Ballpark • Granville, WV	2–8				1,697	27–25	9-13

Post-season
Big 12 Tournament

Date	Opponent	Rank	Site/stadium	Score	Win	Loss	Save	Attendance	Overall record	B12 Record
May 20	#11 Oklahoma State		ONEOK Field • Tulsa, OK	0–3					27–26	9-13
May 21	Oklahoma		ONEOK Field • Tulsa, OK	1–6					27–27	9-13

All rankings from Collegiate Baseball.
