= 2015 Texas Longhorns baseball team =

American university baseball team

2015 Texas Longhorns baseball

Big 12 tournament champions
- Conference: Big 12 Conference
- Record: 30–27 (11–13 Big 12)
- Head coach: Augie Garrido (19th season)
- Assistant coaches: Skip Johnson (9th season); Tommy Nicholson (3rd season)
- Home stadium: UFCU Disch–Falk Field

2015 Big 12 Conference baseball standings
	Conf.				Overall
Team	W		L	PCT	W		L	PCT
No. 4 TCU ‍†‍‍^{y}	18	–	5	.783	51	–	15	.773
No. 19 Oklahoma State ‍‍‍^{y}	14	–	8	.636	38	–	20	.655
Oklahoma ‍‍‍	13	–	11	.542	34	–	27	.557
Texas Tech ‍‍‍	13	–	11	.542	31	–	24	.564
Texas ‍‍‡‍^{y}	11	–	13	.458	30	–	27	.526
Kansas State ‍‍‍	10	–	14	.417	27	–	30	.474
West Virginia ‍‍‍	9	–	13	.409	27	–	27	.500
Baylor ‍‍‍	9	–	15	.375	23	–	32	.418
Kansas ‍‍‍	8	–	15	.348	23	–	32	.418
† – Conference champion ‡ – Tournament champion y – Invited to the NCAA tournament Rankings from Collegiate Baseball

The 2015 Texas Longhorns baseball team represented the University of Texas at Austin during the 2015 NCAA Division I baseball season. The Longhorns played their home games at UFCU Disch–Falk Field as a member of the Big 12 Conference. They were led by head coach Augie Garrido, in his 19th season at Texas.

== Previous season ==
In 2014, the Longhorns finished the season 5th in the Big 12 with a record of 46–21, 13–11 in conference play. They qualified for the 2014 Big 12 Conference baseball tournament, and were eliminated in the semifinals. They qualified for the 2014 NCAA Division I baseball tournament, and were placed in the Houston Regional, along with host Rice, former conference rival Texas A&M, and George Mason. In their first game, the Longhorns defeated Texas A&M by a score of 8–1, and then defeated Rice, 3–2, in 11 innings. In the regional final, the Longhorns again matched up with Texas A&M, and dropped game one to the Aggies, 2–3. However, they rebounded to win game two by a score of 4–1, and advanced to the Super Regional, of which they were selected as hosts. In the Super Regional, they were matched up with Houston, and swept the Cougars, 4–2 and 4–0, to advance to the College World Series.

In the College World Series, Texas opened up against UC Irvine and lost 1–3. In the loser's bracket, they rebounded to defeat Louisville, 4–1, and then defeated the Anteaters in a rematch, 1–0. In the semifinals, the Longhorns defeated Vanderbilt in the first game, 4–0, before falling in 10 innings to the eventual national champions by a score of 3–4.

== Personnel ==
=== Roster ===
2015 Texas Longhorns roster
Pitchers: 5 - Andy McGuire - Sophomore; 13 - Tyler Schimpf - Freshman; 19 - Connor Mayes - Freshman; 24 - Parker French - Senior; 27 - Travis Duke - Junior; 29 - Jon Malmin - Sophomore; 30 - Josh Sawyer - Sophomore; 31 - Chad Hollingsworth - Junior; 34 - Kyle Johnston - Freshman; 35 - Blake Goins - Sophomore; 38 - Ty Culbreth - Junior; 39 - James Swan - (redshirt) Freshman; 41 - Morgan Cooper - Sophomore; 43 - Chance Callihan - Freshman; 48 - Ty Marlow - (redshirt) Senior; 49 - Parker Joe Robinson - Freshman; 51 - Jake McKenzie - Freshman; 52 - Tate Shaw - Freshman; 53 - Kirby Bellow - Senior; 57 - Eric Dunbar - Sophomore	Catchers: 1 - Tres Barrera - Sophomore; 7 - Michael Cantu - Freshman; 32 - Michael McCann - Freshman; 45 - Grant Martin - Senior; 46 - James Barton - Junior; Infielders: 6 - Connor Macalla - (redshirt) Freshman; 8 - Brooks Marlow - Senior; 9 - C.J. Hinojosa - Junior; 12 - Joe Baker - Freshman; 11 - Travis Jones - Freshman; 17 - Bret Boswell - (redshirt) Freshman; 42 - Kacy Clemens - Sophomore	Outfielders: 2 - Kaleb Denny - Freshman; 4 - Collin Shaw - Senior; 14 - Ben Johnson - Junior; 33 - Patrick Mathis - Freshman; 40 - Taylor Stell - (redshirt) Junior; 47 - Ben Kennedy - (redshirt) Freshman; 50 - Zane Gurwitz - Sophomore

=== Coaching staff ===
Name	Position	Seasons at Texas	Alma mater
Augie Garrido	Head coach	19	Fresno State University (1961)
Skip Johnson	Assistant coach	9	University of Texas–Pan American (1990)
Tommy Nicholson	Assistant coach	3	University of Texas at Austin (2006)

== Schedule ==
Legend
	Texas win
	Texas loss
	Postponement
**Bold**	Texas team member

2015 Texas Longhorns baseball game log
Regular season
February

Date	Opponent	Rank	Site/stadium	Score	Win	Loss	Save	Attendance	Overall record	Big 12 Record
February 13	at #22 Rice	#7	Reckling Park • Houston, TX	**W** 3–1	**Duke (1–0)**	McCarthy (0–1)	**Culbreth (1)**	4,755	1–0	
February 14	at #22 Rice	#7	Reckling Park • Houston, TX	L 9–10	Fox (1–0)	**Clemens (0–1)**	Ditman (1)	4,259	1–1	
February 14	at #22 Rice	#7	Reckling Park • Houston, TX	L 2–5	Salinas (1–0)	**Sawyer (0–1)**	Williamson (1)	3,789	1–2	
February 15	at #22 Rice	#7	Reckling Park • Houston, TX	**W 4–3 (10)**	**Culbreth (1–0)**	Williamson (0–1)	**Johnston (1)**	4,388	2–2	
February 17	UTSA	#12	UFCU Disch–Falk Field • Austin, TX	**W 14-2**	**Mayes (1–0)**	Burns (0–1)		4,887	3–2	
February 20	Minnesota	#12	UFCU Disch–Falk Field • Austin, TX	**W 13-2**	**French (1–0)**	Meyer (0–2)	**Malmin (1)**	5,400	4–2	
February 21	Minnesota	#12	UFCU Disch–Falk Field • Austin, TX	**W 5-0**	**Sawyer (1–1)**	Sawyer (0–2)			5–2	
February 21	Minnesota	#12	UFCU Disch–Falk Field • Austin, TX	**W 5-0**	**Hollingsworth (1–0)**	Shannon (0–1)	**Culbreth (2)**	6,325	6–2	
February 22	Minnesota	#12	UFCU Disch–Falk Field • Austin, TX	**W 8-0**	**Clemens (1–1)**	Kunik (0–1)		4,663	7–2	
February 24	Texas–Pan American	#11	UFCU Disch–Falk Field • Austin, TX	**W 5-4**	**Culbreth (2–0)**	Martinez (0–1)		4,479	8–2	
February 27	San Diego	#11	UFCU Disch–Falk Field • Austin, TX	Cancelled (rain)						
February 28	San Diego	#11	UFCU Disch–Falk Field • Austin, TX	Postponed to DH on Sunday, May 1 (rain)						

March

Date	Opponent	Rank	Site/stadium	Score	Win	Loss	Save	Attendance	Overall record	Big 12 Record
March 1	San Diego	#11	UFCU Disch–Falk Field • Austin, TX	L 1–3 (7)	Hill (1–2)	**French (1–1)**	Cornish (1)		8–3	
March 1	San Diego	#11	UFCU Disch–Falk Field • Austin, TX	L 1–6	Hill (2–2)	**Johnston (0–1)**		4,921	8–4	
March 5	at Stanford	#15	Sunken Diamond • Stanford, CA	L 4–5	Thorne (1–0)	**Hollingsworth (1–1)**	Logan (3)	1,246	8–5	
March 6	at Stanford	#15	Sunken Diamond • Stanford, CA	L 3–5	Viall (1–1)	**Bellor (0–1)**	Hock (3)	1,599	8–6	
March 7	at Stanford	#15	Sunken Diamond • Stanford, CA	**W 3-1**	**French (2–1)**	Hanewich (1–1)	**Bellow (1)**	2,221	9–6	
March 8	at Stanford	#15	Sunken Diamond • Stanford, CA	**W 12-4**	**Sawyer (2–1)**	Weir (1–1)		2,010	10–6	
March 10	Incarnate Word	#17	UFCU Disch–Falk Field • Austin, TX	**W 7-1**	**Schimpf (1–0)**	Richey (0–4)		4,946	11–6	
March 13	West Virginia	#17	UFCU Disch–Falk Field • Austin, TX	**W 4–3 (10)**	**Bellow (1–1)**	Smith (2–1)		5,457	12–6	1-0
March 14	West Virginia	#17	UFCU Disch–Falk Field • Austin, TX	L 6–7 (10)	Ennis (1–0)	**Culbreth (2–1)**		6,411	12–7	1-1
March 15	West Virginia	#17	UFCU Disch–Falk Field • Austin, TX	**W 5-1**	**Hollingsworth (2–1)**	Donato (2–3)		5,787	13–7	2-1
March 17	vs. Texas–Arlington	#14	Globe Life Park • Arlington, TX	L 5–6 (10)	Thornberg (1–0)	**Culbreth (2–2)**		4,123	13–8	
March 20	Kansas State	#14	UFCU Disch–Falk Field • Austin, TX	Postponed to DH on Saturday, May 21 (rain)						
March 21	Kansas State	#14	UFCU Disch–Falk Field • Austin, TX	**W 5-3**	**Bellow (2–1)**	Courville (0–1)	**Culbreth (3)**		14–8	3-1
March 21	Kansas State	#14	UFCU Disch–Falk Field • Austin, TX	**W 3-1**	**Hollingsworth (3–1)**	Kalmus (0–2)	**Bellow (2)**	5,372	15–8	4-1
March 22	Kansas State	#14	UFCU Disch–Falk Field • Austin, TX	**W 6-1**	**Clemens (2–1)**	Fischer (1–2)	**Mayes (1)**	5,695	16–8	5-1
March 24	at Texas State	#10	Bobcat Ballpark • San Marcos, TX	**W 6-4**	**Culbreth (3–2)**	Whitter (2–2)	**Bellow (3)**	2,653	17–8	
March 27	at Nebraska	#10	Haymarket Park • Lincoln, NE	L 1–3	Sinclair (4–3)	**French (2–2)**	Roeder (8)	3,221	17–9	
March 28	at Nebraska	#10	Haymarket Park • Lincoln, NE	L 0–1 (15)	Chesnut (4–0)	**Duke (1–1)**		5,852	17–10	
March 29	at Nebraska	#10	Haymarket Park • Lincoln, NE	L 2–6	Burkamper (4–1)	**Hollingsworth (3–2)**		5,793	17–11	
March 31	Texas A&M–Corpus Christi	#23	UFCU Disch–Falk Field • Austin, TX	L 4–6 (10)	Dorris (1–2)	**Mayes (1–1)**		5,293	17–12	

April

Date	Opponent	Rank	Site/stadium	Score	Win	Loss	Save	Attendance	Overall record	Big 12 Record
April 3	at Oklahoma State	#23	Allie P. Reynolds Stadium • Stillwater, OK	L 3–6 (18)	Hassel (1–0)	**Malmin (0–1)**		1,504	17–13	5-2
April 4	at Oklahoma State	#23	Allie P. Reynolds Stadium • Stillwater, OK	L 1–3	Buffett (3–1)	**Hollingsworth (3–3)**	Cobb (1)	1,707	17–14	5-3
April 5	at Oklahoma State	#23	Allie P. Reynolds Stadium • Stillwater, OK	L 3–8	Freeman (6–0)	**Clemens (2–2)**		816	17–15	5-4
April 7	Wichita State		UFCU Disch–Falk Field • Austin, TX	**W 6-4**	**McKenzie (1–0)**	Williams (1–2)	**Culbreth (4)**	5,201	18–15	
April 10	Oklahoma		UFCU Disch–Falk Field • Austin, TX	L 2–3 (12)	Garza (1–1)	**Mayes (1–2)**	Evans (3)	6,807	18–16	5-5
April 11	Oklahoma		UFCU Disch–Falk Field • Austin, TX	**W 4-1**	**Clemens (3–2)**	Hansen (4–4)	**Bellow (4)**	6,518	19–16	6-5
April 12	Oklahoma		UFCU Disch–Falk Field • Austin, TX	L 2–3	Tasin (6–1)	**Hollingsworth (3–4)**	Evans (4)	5,506	19–17	6-6
April 14	Sam Houston State		UFCU Disch–Falk Field • Austin, TX	L 0–5	Church (2–1)	**Sawyer (2–2)**		4,988	19–18	
April 17	at Kansas		Hoglund Ballpark • Lawrence, KS	**W 3–2 (14)**	**Marlow (1–0)**	Villines (2–3)	**Malmin (2)**	1,131	20–18	7-6
April 18	at Kansas		Hoglund Ballpark • Lawrence, KS	L 4–5	Gilbert (2–2)	**Mayes (1–3)**		1,233	20–19	7-7
April 19	at Kansas		Hoglund Ballpark • Lawrence, KS	**W 16-7**	**McGuire (1–0)**	Weiman (1–6)	**Duke (1)**	1,384	21–19	8-7
April 21	Texas State		UFCU Disch–Falk Field • Austin, TX	**W 7-3**	**Sawyer (3–2)**	Parsons (0–4)		5,615	22–19	
April 24	at TCU		Lupton Stadium • Fort Worth, TX	Postponed to DH on Saturday, April 25 (rain)						
April 25	at TCU		Lupton Stadium • Fort Worth, TX	L 5–6	Morrison (9–1)	**French (2–3)**	Ferrell (11)	4,256	22–20	8-8
April 25	at TCU		Lupton Stadium • Fort Worth, TX	L 6–11	Trieglaff (2–0)	**Culbreth (3–3)**		5,198	22–21	8-9
April 26	at TCU		Lupton Stadium • Fort Worth, TX	L 1–7	Young (8–2)	**Hollingsworth (3–5)**		4,598	22–22	8-10
April 28	Prairie View A&M		UFCU Disch–Falk Field • Austin, TX	**W 12-4**	**McKenzie (2–0)**	Edward (0–4)		4,968	23–22	

May

Date	Opponent	Rank	Site/stadium	Score	Win	Loss	Save	Attendance	Overall record	Big 12 Record
May 1	Texas Tech		UFCU Disch–Falk Field • Austin, TX	**W 3-0**	**French (3–3)**	Moseley (4–5)	**Mayes (2)**	5,261	24–22	9-10
May 2	Texas Tech		UFCU Disch–Falk Field • Austin, TX	L 1–9	Smith (6–3)	**Culbreth (3–4)**		7,018	24–23	9-11
May 3	Texas Tech		UFCU Disch–Falk Field • Austin, TX	L 1–5	Moreno (3–3)	**Mayes (1–4)**		6,284	24–24	9-12
May 5	Texas State		UFCU Disch–Falk Field • Austin, TX	Cancelled (rain)						
May 16	at Baylor		Baylor Ballpark • Waco, TX	**W 6-5**	**Bellow (3–1)**	Spicer (1–2)		2,804	25–24	10-12
May 17	at Baylor		Baylor Ballpark • Waco, TX	L 1–7	Lewis (3–2)	**Sawyer (3–3)**	Hessemer (1)	2,538	25–25	10-13
May 17	at Baylor		Baylor Ballpark • Waco, TX	**W 11-1**	**Johnston (1–1)**	Castano (4–6)		1,884	26–25	11-13

Postseason
Big 12 Tournament

Date	Opponent	Rank	Site/stadium	Score	Win	Loss	Save	Attendance	Overall record	Tournament Record
May 20	Texas Tech		ONEOK Field • Tulsa, OK	**W 2-1**	**French (4–3)**	Smith (6–5)			27–25	1-0
May 21	Baylor		ONEOK Field • Tulsa, OK	**W 4-3**	**Culbreth (4–4)**	Tolson (3–8)			28–25	2-0
May 23	Baylor		ONEOK Field • Tulsa, OK	**W 4-0**	**Mayes (2–4)**	Kay (3–4)			29–25	3-0
May 24	Oklahoma State		ONEOK Field • Tulsa, OK	**W 6-3**	**French (5–3)**	Reed (3–2)	**Bellow (5)**	4,976	30–25	4-0

NCAA Dallas Regional

Date	Opponent	Rank	Site/stadium	Score	Win	Loss	Save	Attendance	Overall record	Regional Record
May 29	Oregon State	#30	Horner Ballpark • Dallas, TX	L 4–5	Church (1-)	**Bellow (3–2)**	Hickey (11)	2,643	30–26	0-1
May 31	Dallas Baptist	#30	Horner Ballpark • Dallas, TX	L 1–8	Taylor (7–1)	**Culbreth (4–5)**		3,242	30–27	0-2

All rankings from Collegiate Baseball.

== Rankings ==
Ranking movements Legend: ██ Increase in ranking ██ Decrease in ranking
	Week																		
Poll	Pre	1	2	3	4	5	6	7	8	9	10	11	12	13	14	15	16	17	Final
Coaches'	6	6*	6	12	17	16	12	19											
Baseball America	10	10	9	14	22	21	19												
Collegiate Baseball^	7	12	11	15	17	14	10	23								30			
NCBWA†	6	9	8	13	16	14	11	18	25										

^ Collegiate Baseball ranked 40 teams in their preseason poll, but only ranked 30 teams weekly during the season.
† NCBWA ranks 30 teams in their preseason poll, but only ranks 25 teams weekly during the season.
* A new poll was not released for this week, so for comparison purposes, the previous week's ranking is inserted in this week's slot.
