= 2015 Oklahoma Sooners baseball team =

American college baseball season

2015 Oklahoma Sooners baseball
- Conference: Big 12 Conference
- Record: 32–25 (13–11 Big 12)
- Head coach: Pete Hughes (2nd season)
- Assistant coaches: Jamie Pinzino (2nd season); Mike Anderson (2nd season)
- Captain: Baker Mayfield
- Home stadium: L. Dale Mitchell Baseball Park

2015 Big 12 Conference baseball standings
	Conf.				Overall
Team	W		L	PCT	W		L	PCT
No. 4 TCU ‍†‍‍^{y}	18	–	5	.783	51	–	15	.773
No. 19 Oklahoma State ‍‍‍^{y}	14	–	8	.636	38	–	20	.655
Oklahoma ‍‍‍	13	–	11	.542	34	–	27	.557
Texas Tech ‍‍‍	13	–	11	.542	31	–	24	.564
Texas ‍‍‡‍^{y}	11	–	13	.458	30	–	27	.526
Kansas State ‍‍‍	10	–	14	.417	27	–	30	.474
West Virginia ‍‍‍	9	–	13	.409	27	–	27	.500
Baylor ‍‍‍	9	–	15	.375	23	–	32	.418
Kansas ‍‍‍	8	–	15	.348	23	–	32	.418
† – Conference champion ‡ – Tournament champion y – Invited to the NCAA tournament Rankings from Collegiate Baseball

The 2015 Oklahoma Sooners baseball team represented the University of Oklahoma during the 2015 NCAA Division I baseball season. The Sooners played their home games at L. Dale Mitchell Baseball Park as a member of the Big 12 Conference. They were led by head coach Pete Hughes, in his second season at Oklahoma.

== Previous season ==
In 2014, the Sooners finished the season 8th in the Big 12 with a record of 29–29, 8–16 in conference play. They qualified for the 2014 Big 12 Conference baseball tournament, and were eliminated in the second round. They failed to qualify for the 2014 NCAA Division I baseball tournament.

== Personnel ==
=== Roster ===
2015 Oklahoma Sooners roster
Pitchers: 11 – Jacob Evans – Junior; 12 – Keaton Hernandez – Junior; 13 – Thomas McIlraith – Junior; 15 – Blake Rogers – Junior; 18 – Troy Chezem – Freshman; 24 – Hayden Jones – (redshirt) Sophomore; 25 – Corey Copping – Junior; 26 – Cole Stevens – (redshirt) Junior; 27 – Robert Tasin – (redshirt) Senior; 28 – Shawn Hunter – Junior; 31 – Kenny Saenz – Freshman; 32 – Ralph Garza – Junior; 33 – Jake Elliott – Sophomore; 34 – Adam Choplick – (redshirt) Junior; 35 – Alec Hansen – Sophomore; 38 – Chad Nelson – (redshirt) Sophomore; 40 – Jeffrey Curran – Junior; 42 – Brock Barger – Freshman	Catchers: 6 – Chandler Wagoner – Freshman; 9 – Anthony Hermelyn – Junior; 37 – Jacob Leal – Sophomore; 39 – Chris Shaw – Junior; Infielders: 2 – Joshua Ake – Senior; 5 – Kyle Mendenhall – Freshman; 7 – Alex Wise – Junior; 8 – Cameron Frazier – Freshman; 16 – Tyler Coolbaugh – (redshirt) Sophomore; 22 – Sheldon Neuse – Sophomore; 23 – Kolbey Carpenter – Junior; 29 – Quin Walbergh – Freshman; 44 – Austin O'Brien – Sophomore	Outfielders: 3 – Craig Aikin – Junior; 4 – Hunter Haley – Junior; 21 – Taylor Alspaugh – (redshirt) Senior

=== Coaching staff ===
Name	Position	Seasons at Oklahoma	Alma mater
Pete Hughes	Head coach	2	Davidson College (1990)
Jamie Pinzino	Assistant coach	2	Tufts University (1997)
Mike Anderson	Assistant coach	2	University of Northern Colorado (1990)

== Schedule ==
Legend
	Oklahoma win
	Oklahoma loss
	Postponement
**Bold**	Oklahoma team member

2015 Oklahoma Sooners baseball game log
Regular season

February
#	Date	Opponent	Rank	Site/stadium	Score	Win	Loss	Save	Attendance	Overall record	B12 Record
1	February 13	Notre Dame		L. Dale Mitchell Park • Norman, OK							
2	February 14	SIU Edwardsville		L. Dale Mitchell Park • Norman, OK							
3	February 14	Notre Dame		L. Dale Mitchell Park • Norman, OK							
4	February 15	Notre Dame		L. Dale Mitchell Park • Norman, OK							
5	February 15	SIU Edwardsville		L. Dale Mitchell Park • Norman, OK							
6	February 18	at Arizona State		Phoenix Municipal Stadium • Phoenix, AZ							
7	February 19	vs. Washington State		Sloan Park • Mesa, AZ							
8	February 20	vs. Washington		Sloan Park • Mesa, AZ							
9	February 21	vs. Oregon State		Surprise Stadium • Surprise, AZ							
10	February 22	vs. Utah		Goodyear Ballpark • Goodyear, AZ							
11	February 24	at Dallas Baptist		Horner Ballpark • Dallas, TX							
12	February 26	BYU		L. Dale Mitchell Park • Norman, OK							
13	February 27	BYU		L. Dale Mitchell Park • Norman, OK							
14	February 27	BYU		L. Dale Mitchell Park • Norman, OK							
15	February 28	BYU		L. Dale Mitchell Park • Norman, OK							

March
#	Date	Opponent	Rank	Site/stadium	Score	Win	Loss	Save	Attendance	Overall record	B12 Record
16	March 3	Arkansas–Little Rock		L. Dale Mitchell Park • Norman, OK							
17	March 6	Purdue		L. Dale Mitchell Park • Norman, OK							
18	March 7	Purdue		L. Dale Mitchell Park • Norman, OK							
19	March 8	Purdue		L. Dale Mitchell Park • Norman, OK							
20	March 10	Oral Roberts		L. Dale Mitchell Park • Norman, OK							
21	March 12	at Hawaii		Les Murakami Stadium • Honolulu, HI							
22	March 13	at Hawaii		Les Murakami Stadium • Honolulu, HI							
23	March 14	at Hawaii		Les Murakami Stadium • Honolulu, HI							
24	March 15	at Hawaii		Les Murakami Stadium • Honolulu, HI							
25	March 20	Texas Tech		L. Dale Mitchell Park • Norman, OK							
26	March 21	Texas Tech		L. Dale Mitchell Park • Norman, OK							
27	March 22	Texas Tech		L. Dale Mitchell Park • Norman, OK							
28	March 24	at TCU		Lupton Stadium • Fort Worth, TX							
29	March 27	at Baylor		Baylor Ballpark • Waco, TX							
30	March 28	at Baylor		Baylor Ballpark • Waco, TX							
31	March 29	at Baylor		Baylor Ballpark • Waco, TX							
32	March 31	Central Arkansas		L. Dale Mitchell Park • Norman, OK							

April
#	Date	Opponent	Rank	Site/stadium	Score	Win	Loss	Save	Attendance	Overall record	B12 Record
33	April 2	Kansas		L. Dale Mitchell Park • Norman, OK							
34	April 3	Kansas		L. Dale Mitchell Park • Norman, OK							
35	April 4	Kansas		L. Dale Mitchell Park • Norman, OK							
36	April 7	at Oklahoma State		Allie P. Reynolds Stadium • Stillwater, OK							
37	April 10	at Texas		UFCU Disch–Falk Field • Austin, TX							
38	April 11	at Texas		UFCU Disch–Falk Field • Austin, TX							
39	April 12	at Texas		UFCU Disch–Falk Field • Austin, TX							
40	April 14	Dallas Baptist		L. Dale Mitchell Park • Norman, OK							
41	April 17	at West Virginia		Monongalia County Ballpark • Granville, WV							
42	April 18	at West Virginia		Monongalia County Ballpark • Granville, WV							
43	April 19	at West Virginia		Monongalia County Ballpark • Granville, WV							
44	April 24	Sam Houston State		L. Dale Mitchell Park • Norman, OK							
45	April 25	Sam Houston State		L. Dale Mitchell Park • Norman, OK							
46	April 26	Sam Houston State		L. Dale Mitchell Park • Norman, OK							
47	April 28	at Wichita State		Eck Stadium • Wichita, KS							

May
#	Date	Opponent	Rank	Site/stadium	Score	Win	Loss	Save	Attendance	Overall record	B12 Record
48	May 1	vs. Oklahoma State		ONEOK Field • Tulsa, OK							
49	May 2	vs. Oklahoma State		Chickasaw Bricktown Ballpark • Oklahoma City, OK							
50	May 3	vs. Oklahoma State		Chickasaw Bricktown Ballpark • Oklahoma City, OK							
51	May 8	at Kansas State		Tointon Family Stadium • Manhattan, KS							
52	May 9	at Kansas State		Tointon Family Stadium • Manhattan, KS							
53	May 10	at Kansas State		Tointon Family Stadium • Manhattan, KS							
54	May 14	TCU		L. Dale Mitchell Park • Norman, OK							
55	May 15	TCU		L. Dale Mitchell Park • Norman, OK							
56	May 16	TCU		L. Dale Mitchell Park • Norman, OK							

Postseason

Big 12 Tournament
#	Date	Opponent	Rank	Site/stadium	Score	Win	Loss	Save	Attendance	Overall record	Tourn. Record
		TBD		ONEOK Field • Tulsa, OK							
		TBD		ONEOK Field • Tulsa, OK							

All rankings from Collegiate Baseball.

== Awards and honors ==
Sheldon Neuse

- Perfect Game USA Pre-season Second Team All-American
- Baseball America Pre-season First team All-American
