= 2015 Oklahoma State Cowboys baseball team =

American college baseball season

2015 Oklahoma State Cowboys baseball
- Conference: Big 12 Conference

Ranking
- Coaches: No. 18
- CB: No. 19
- Record: 38–20 (14–8 Big 12)
- Head coach: Josh Holliday (3rd season)
- Assistant coaches: Marty Lees (3rd season); Rob Walton (3rd season)
- Home stadium: Allie P. Reynolds Stadium

2015 Big 12 Conference baseball standings
	Conf.				Overall
Team	W		L	PCT	W		L	PCT
No. 4 TCU ‍†‍‍^{y}	18	–	5	.783	51	–	15	.773
No. 19 Oklahoma State ‍‍‍^{y}	14	–	8	.636	38	–	20	.655
Oklahoma ‍‍‍	13	–	11	.542	34	–	27	.557
Texas Tech ‍‍‍	13	–	11	.542	31	–	24	.564
Texas ‍‍‡‍^{y}	11	–	13	.458	30	–	27	.526
Kansas State ‍‍‍	10	–	14	.417	27	–	30	.474
West Virginia ‍‍‍	9	–	13	.409	27	–	27	.500
Baylor ‍‍‍	9	–	15	.375	23	–	32	.418
Kansas ‍‍‍	8	–	15	.348	23	–	32	.418
† – Conference champion ‡ – Tournament champion y – Invited to the NCAA tournament Rankings from Collegiate Baseball

The 2015 Oklahoma State Cowboys baseball team represented Oklahoma State University during the 2015 NCAA Division I baseball season. The Cowboys played their home games at Allie P. Reynolds Stadium as a member of the Big 12 Conference. They were led by head coach Josh Holliday, in his third season at Oklahoma State.

== Previous season ==
In 2014, the Cowboys finished the season as champions of the Big 12 with a record of 48–18, 18–6 in conference play. They qualified for the 2014 Big 12 Conference baseball tournament, and were eliminated in the finals. They qualified for the 2014 NCAA Division I baseball tournament, and were selected as hosts of the Stillwater Regional, being placed with Nebraska, Cal State Fullerton, and Binghamton. In their opening game, the Cowboys shut-out Binghamton, 8–0. In their second game, they defeated Cal State Fullerton by a score of 13–7. In the regional final, the Cowboys again defeated Cal State Fullerton, this time by a score of 6–4. They advanced to the Super Regional, of which they were hosts, to play UC Irvine. In the first game, the Anteaters defeated the Cowboys, 8–4, and then won Game Two in a shutout, 1–0, to advance to the College World Series.

== Personnel ==
=== Roster ===
2015 Oklahoma State Cowboys roster
Pitchers: 3 - Garrett McCain - Freshman; 15 - Garrett Williams - Sophomore; 19 - Carson Teel - Freshman; 23 - Michael Freeman - Senior; 24 - Conor Costello - Junior; 25 - Trey Cobb - Sophomore; 26 - Reid Wall - Freshman; 27 - Tyler Nurdin - Senior; 30 - Koda Glover - Junior; 31 - Matt Wilson - Sophomore; 32 - Reid Barnett - Senior; 35 - Carson LaRue - Freshman; 36 - Reed Bastie - Sophomore; 37 - Tyler Buffett - Sophomore; 38 - Frank Arena - Junior; 39 - Alex Hackerott - Junior; 40 - Remey Reed - Sophomore; 42 - Kyle Bagnell - Senior; 43 - Blake Battenfield - Sophomore; 45 - Thomas Hatch - Sophomore; 46 - Jon Perrin - Senior; 56 - Michael Mertz - Junior	Catchers: 14 - Dillon White - Sophomore; 34 - Bryan Case - Senior; 55 - Michael Higgins - Freshman; Infielders: 2 - Tim Arakawa - Senior; 4 - Jacob Chappell - Freshman; 5 - Donnie Walton - Junior; 6 - David Petrino - Junior; 12 - Caleb Eldridge - Freshman; 16 - Kevin Bradley - Sophomore; 18 - Hunter Hagler - Senior; 22 - Dustin Williams - Sophomore; 33 - Mason O'Brien - Freshman; 44 - Andrew Rosa - Sophomore	Outfielders: 8 - Ryan Sluder - Sophomore; 13 - Jon Littell - Freshman; 17 - Gage Green - Senior; 28 - Corey Hassel - Junior

=== Coaching staff ===
Name	Position	Seasons at Oklahoma State	Alma mater
Josh Holliday	Head coach	3	Oklahoma State University (2004)
Marty Lees	Assistant coach	3	Western Oregon University (1994)
Rob Walton	Assistant coach	3	Oklahoma State University (1986)

== Schedule ==
Legend
	Oklahoma State win
	Oklahoma State loss
	Postponement
**Bold**	Oklahoma State team member

2015 Oklahoma State Cowboys baseball game log
Regular Season
February

#	Date	Opponent	Rank	Site/stadium	Score	Win	Loss	Save	Attendance	Overall record	B12 Record
1	February 13	at #19 Arizona State	#5	Phoenix Municipal Stadium • Phoenix, AZ							
2	February 14	at #19 Arizona State	#5	Phoenix Municipal Stadium • Phoenix, AZ							
3	February 15	at #19 Arizona State	#5	Phoenix Municipal Stadium • Phoenix, AZ							
4	February 19	vs. Oregon State	#10	Surprise Stadium • Surprise, AZ							
5	February 20	vs. Washington State	#10	Surprise Stadium • Surprise, AZ							
6	February 21	vs. Utah	#10	Sloan Park • Mesa, AZ							
7	February 22	vs. Washington	#10	Peoria Sports Complex • Peoria, AZ							
8	February 25	Missouri State	#10	Allie P. Reynolds Stadium • Stillwater, OK							
9	February 27	Western Illinois	#10	Allie P. Reynolds Stadium • Stillwater, OK							
10	February 28	Western Illinois	#10	Allie P. Reynolds Stadium • Stillwater, OK							

March

#	Date	Opponent	Rank	Site/stadium	Score	Win	Loss	Save	Attendance	Overall record	B12 Record
11	March 1	Western Illinois	#10	Allie P. Reynolds Stadium • Stillwater, OK							
12	March 3	UNLV	#14	Allie P. Reynolds Stadium • Stillwater, OK							
13	March 4	UNLV	#14	Allie P. Reynolds Stadium • Stillwater, OK							
14	March 6	#27 Illinois	#14	Allie P. Reynolds Stadium • Stillwater, OK							
15	March 7	#27 Illinois	#14	Allie P. Reynolds Stadium • Stillwater, OK							
16	March 8	#27 Illinois	#14	Allie P. Reynolds Stadium • Stillwater, OK							
17	March 10	Alcorn State	#23	Allie P. Reynolds Stadium • Stillwater, OK							
18	March 11	Alcorn State	#23	Allie P. Reynolds Stadium • Stillwater, OK							
19	March 13	Grand Canyon	#23	Allie P. Reynolds Stadium • Stillwater, OK							
20	March 14	Grand Canyon	#23	Allie P. Reynolds Stadium • Stillwater, OK							
21	March 15	Grand Canyon	#23	Allie P. Reynolds Stadium • Stillwater, OK							
22	March 17	Central Arkansas	#19	Allie P. Reynolds Stadium • Stillwater, OK							
23	March 20	at #1 TCU	#19	Lupton Stadium • Fort Worth, TX							
24	March 21	at #1 TCU	#19	Lupton Stadium • Fort Worth, TX							
25	March 22	at #1 TCU	#19	Lupton Stadium • Fort Worth, TX							
26	March 24	Wichita State	#12	Allie P. Reynolds Stadium • Stillwater, OK							
27	March 27	Kansas State	#12	Allie P. Reynolds Stadium • Stillwater, OK							
28	March 28	Kansas State	#12	Allie P. Reynolds Stadium • Stillwater, OK							
29	March 29	Kansas State	#12	Allie P. Reynolds Stadium • Stillwater, OK							
30	March 31	at Oral Roberts	#11	J. L. Johnson Stadium • Tulsa, OK							

April

#	Date	Opponent	Rank	Site/stadium	Score	Win	Loss	Save	Attendance	Overall record	B12 Record
31	April 3	#23 Texas	#11	Allie P. Reynolds Stadium • Stillwater, OK							
32	April 4	#23 Texas	#11	Allie P. Reynolds Stadium • Stillwater, OK							
33	April 5	#23 Texas	#11	Allie P. Reynolds Stadium • Stillwater, OK							
34	April 7	Oklahoma	#9	Allie P. Reynolds Stadium • Stillwater, OK							
35	April 10	at Kansas	#9	Hoglund Ballpark • Lawrence, KS							
36	April 11	at Kansas	#9	Hoglund Ballpark • Lawrence, KS							
37	April 12	at Kansas	#9	Hoglund Ballpark • Lawrence, KS							
38	April 14	Oral Roberts	#10	Allie P. Reynolds Stadium • Stillwater, OK							
39	April 17	Baylor	#10	Allie P. Reynolds Stadium • Stillwater, OK							
40	April 18	Baylor	#10	Allie P. Reynolds Stadium • Stillwater, OK							
41	April 19	Baylor	#10	Allie P. Reynolds Stadium • Stillwater, OK							
42	April 21	#22 Dallas Baptist	#9	Allie P. Reynolds Stadium • Stillwater, OK							
43	April 24	at Texas Tech	#9	Rip Griffin Park • Lubbock, TX							
44	April 25	at Texas Tech	#9	Rip Griffin Park • Lubbock, TX							
45	April 26	at Texas Tech	#9	Rip Griffin Park • Lubbock, TX							
46	April 28	Arkansas–Little Rock	#11	Allie P. Reynolds Stadium • Stillwater, OK							

May

#	Date	Opponent	Rank	Site/stadium	Score	Win	Loss	Save	Attendance	Overall record	B12 Record
47	May 1	vs. #25 Oklahoma	#11	ONEOK Field • Tulsa, OK							
48	May 2	vs. #25 Oklahoma	#11	Chickasaw Bricktown Ballpark • Oklahoma City, OK							
49	May 3	vs. #25 Oklahoma	#11	Chickasaw Bricktown Ballpark • Oklahoma City, OK							
50	May 8	West Virginia	#12	Allie P. Reynolds Stadium • Stillwater, OK							
51	May 9	West Virginia	#12	Allie P. Reynolds Stadium • Stillwater, OK							
52	May 10	West Virginia	#12	Allie P. Reynolds Stadium • Stillwater, OK							
53	May 12	at #16 Dallas Baptist	#14	Horner Ballpark • Dallas, TX							
54	May 14	at Michigan	#14	Ray Fisher Stadium • Ann Arbor, MI							
55	May 15	at Michigan	#14	Ray Fisher Stadium • Ann Arbor, MI							
56	May 16	at Michigan	#14	Ray Fisher Stadium • Ann Arbor, MI							

Post-Season
Big 12 Tournament

#	Date	Opponent	Rank	Site/stadium	Score	Win	Loss	Save	Attendance	Overall record	Tourn. Record
		TBD		ONEOK Field • Tulsa, OK							
		TBD		ONEOK Field • Tulsa, OK							

All rankings from Collegiate Baseball.

== Rankings ==
Ranking movements Legend: ██ Increase in ranking ██ Decrease in ranking
	Week																		
Poll	Pre	1	2	3	4	5	6	7	8	9	10	11	12	13	14	15	16	17	Final
Coaches'	8	8*	8*	21			23	16	14	14	15	13	11	13	11	12	18	18*	18
Baseball America	8	9	10	10			23	17	15	17	17	12	12	13	12	11	11*	11*	11
Collegiate Baseball^	5	10	10	14	23	19	12	11	9	10	9	11	12	14	14	15	19	19	19
NCBWA†	8	16	16	17	24	23	21	17	13	14	15	13	11	14	11	11	19	19	19

^ Collegiate Baseball ranked 40 teams in their preseason poll, but only ranked 30 teams weekly during the season.
† NCBWA ranks 30 teams in their preseason poll, but only ranks 25 teams weekly during the season.
* A new poll was not released for this week, so for comparison purposes, the previous week's ranking is inserted in this week's slot.
