= 2015 TCU Horned Frogs baseball team =

Baseball Team

2015 TCU Horned Frogs baseball

Big 12 Regular season champions NCAA Fort Worth Regional champions NCAA Fort Worth Super Regional champions College World Series, L 2–2
- Conference: Big 12 Conference

Ranking
- Coaches: No. 4
- Record: 51–15 (18–5 Big 12)
- Head coach: Jim Schlossnagle (12th season)
- Assistant coaches: Bill Mosiello (2nd season); Kirk Saarloos (3rd season); Zach Etheredge (2nd season)
- Home stadium: Lupton Stadium

2015 Big 12 Conference baseball standings
	Conf.				Overall
Team	W		L	PCT	W		L	PCT
No. 4 TCU ‍†‍‍^{y}	18	–	5	.783	51	–	15	.773
No. 19 Oklahoma State ‍‍‍^{y}	14	–	8	.636	38	–	20	.655
Oklahoma ‍‍‍	13	–	11	.542	34	–	27	.557
Texas Tech ‍‍‍	13	–	11	.542	31	–	24	.564
Texas ‍‍‡‍^{y}	11	–	13	.458	30	–	27	.526
Kansas State ‍‍‍	10	–	14	.417	27	–	30	.474
West Virginia ‍‍‍	9	–	13	.409	27	–	27	.500
Baylor ‍‍‍	9	–	15	.375	23	–	32	.418
Kansas ‍‍‍	8	–	15	.348	23	–	32	.418
† – Conference champion ‡ – Tournament champion y – Invited to the NCAA tournament Rankings from Collegiate Baseball

The 2015 TCU Horned Frogs baseball team represented Texas Christian University during the 2015 NCAA Division I baseball season. The Horned Frogs played their home games at Lupton Stadium as a member of the Big 12 Conference. They were led by head coach Jim Schlossnagle, in his 12th year at TCU.

== Previous season ==
The 2014 Horned Frogs earned a 38–15 (17–7) regular season record and finished second in the Big 12 Conference behind regular season champion Oklahoma State. They qualified for the 2014 Big 12 Conference baseball tournament and defeated Oklahoma State 7–1 in the tournament final for TCU's first-ever Big 12 Championship. The championship earned the Frogs the Big 12's automatic bid to the 2014 NCAA Division I baseball tournament. The Horned Frogs were selected as the #7 national seed, the first-ever national seed earned in program history.

The #7 national seed Horned Frogs hosted the Fort Worth Regional, which also included Dallas Baptist, Sam Houston State, and Siena. TCU opened NCAA tournament play with two extra innings victories: first, a 2–1 victory over Siena in 11 innings, and second, a 3–2 victory over Sam Houston State in 22 innings. In the regional final, the Horned Frogs defeated Sam Houston State, 6–1, to advance to the Fort Worth Super Regional, hosting the Pepperdine Waves. The 2014 Fort Worth Super Regional was the first Super Regional ever hosted by TCU. The Horned Frogs prevailed over the Pepperdine Waves in game one with a 3–2 victory, but fell in game two by a score of 2–3. The Frogs and Waves played a third and final game, a game the Frogs won 6–5, earning TCU a berth to the College World Series in Omaha, Nebraska. The 2014 College World Series berth was the second in school history. In the College World Series, the Horned Frogs first faced Big 12 foe Texas Tech. TCU defeated the Red Raiders 3–2 but went on to lose their second CWS game to Virginia 2–3 in 15 innings. In their third game, the Frogs fell to Ole Miss, 4–6, and were eliminated from the NCAA tournament. The Horned Frogs finished the 2014 season ranked #5 in both the Coaches' Poll and CBN Poll.

== Regular season ==
Coming off the program's second College World Series appearance in 2014, TCU entered the 2015 season ranked as high as #2 in preseason polls. The Horned Frogs opened the 2015 season with a 7–1 record in the month of February, including a series win at #9-ranked Arizona State, that pushed the Frogs as high as #1 in the polls. TCU opened the month of March with a home win over the #16 Rice Owls, then traveled to Los Angeles to compete in the 2015 Dodgertown Classic, where the Horned Frogs notched a win at #7 UCLA and knocked off the defending national champion Vanderbilt Commodores at Dodger Stadium. The Frogs compiled a record of 14–4 in the month of March, losing only one series to conference foe and defending Big 12 regular season champion Oklahoma State.

TCU entered the month of April with an overall record of 21–5 (4–2 Big 12). The Frogs notched a 13–4 record in the month of April to run their overall record to 34–9 (10–5 Big 12). The team's only losses came on the road, where they dropped a series at Kansas State, a single game at Texas Tech, and a mid-week tilt at Dallas Baptist. The Horned Frogs were undefeated at home in April, including series sweeps of Santa Clara and Texas. TCU's sweep of Texas ran the Frogs' all-time Big 12 record versus the Longhorns to 8–1.

The Frogs responded to the late-April loss by piling up 9 wins in a row to complete the regular season, On May 6, 2015, the Horned Frogs clinched their first-ever outright Big 12 Regular season Baseball Championship and secured the #1 seed in the 2015 Big 12 Baseball Tournament by winning a 5–4 thriller at Oklahoma. TCU concluded the regular series with a series sweep of Oklahoma, their fifth consecutive series sweep.

== Postseason ==
=== Big 12 Conference tournament ===
As the Big 12 regular season champion, TCU earned the #1 seed in the 2015 Big 12 Conference baseball tournament. TCU was defeated by the Baylor Bears in their first tournament game and eliminated by the Texas Tech Red Raiders in their second game. The Frogs' 0–2 run in the Big 12 Tournament marked only the second time in Big 12 history that the top-seeded team failed to win a game in the Tournament. The losses also marked the first time TCU lost back-to-back games during the 2015 season.

=== NCAA Fort Worth Regional ===
TCU received an at-large bid to the 2015 NCAA Division I baseball tournament and was awarded the #7 National Seed, the second consecutive National Seed and the second in program history. 2015 marked the Horned Frogs' thirteenth NCAA tournament appearance and their eleventh in twelve seasons. For the fifth time in program history and second consecutive year, TCU was selected as one of the sixteen NCAA Regional tournament hosts. The Horned Frogs were the top-seeded team in the double-elimination regional tournament which also included North Carolina State, Stony Brook and Sacred Heart.

TCU won its Regional opener over Sacred Heart 10–0. The shutout marked the Frogs' 10th of the season. TCU fell into the losers' bracket with a second-game, 4–5 loss to NC State. The Frogs bounced back by sweeping a Sunday doubleheader with an 8–3 win over Stony Brook and an 8–2 win over NC State. The doubleheader sweep forced a decisive final game between TCU and NC State on Monday, June 1. NC State built an 8–1 lead by the top of the 8th inning, but allowed TCU to score 6 unearned runs in the bottom of the frame. TCU tied the game at 8 in the bottom of the 9th and took the game and Regional Tournament championship in the bottom of the 10th off an RBI single by Elliott Barzilli.

=== NCAA Fort Worth Super Regional ===
For the second consecutive year and fifth time in the past seven seasons, the Horned Frogs won an NCAA Regional and advanced to an NCAA Super Regional.

As a top-8 National Seed, the Fort Worth Regional Champions were awarded the right to host Texas A&M, the winner of the College Station Regional, in the 2015 NCAA Fort Worth Super Regional. The winner of the Fort Worth Super Regional will advance to the 2015 College World Series in Omaha, Nebraska. The Super Regional is a best-of-3 series to be played June 6, 7, and 8 (if necessary). June 6, 2015, marked the first time TCU and in-state rival Texas A&M faced off since the 2012 NCAA College Station Regional, in which the Horned Frogs defeated the host Aggies to advance to the 2012 Los Angeles Super Regional.

TCU took game one of the Fort Worth Super Regional, defeating Texas A&M 13–4 in front of a record Lupton Stadium crowd of 7,199. The Aggies bounced back to claim game two, defeating the Frogs 2–1 in front of another record Lupton Stadium crowd of 7,383, forcing a decisive game three. With a 5–4 win in 16 innings, the Horned Frogs clinched the Fort Worth Super Regional Championship and advanced to the 2015 College World Series.

=== NCAA College World Series ===
For the third time in program history and second consecutive year, the TCU Horned Frogs, the Big 12 Regular season Champion, Fort Worth Regional Champion and Fort Worth Super Regional Champion, advanced to the College World Series.

The Horned Frogs opened CWS play against the #2 National Seed and SEC Regular season Champion LSU Tigers on Sunday, June 14. TCU stunned the Tigers 10–3 to advance into the winners' bracket. The opening CWS win marked the Frogs' 50th win of the season, making 2015 the second 50-win season in TCU history. The Frogs fell to the defending National Champion Vanderbilt Commodores 1–0 on June 16. The loss marked the Frogs' first shutout loss in 113 games. TCU bounced back in a June 18 elimination game with an 8–4 win over LSU to eliminate the Tigers, but the Vanderbilt Commodores again defeated to Frogs on June 19, bring an end to the Horned Frogs' exceptional season.

TCU's final season record for 2015 was 51–15 (18–5 Big 12).

== Personnel ==
=== Roster ===
2015 TCU Horned Frogs
Pitchers: 11 - Travis Evans - Senior; 12 - Riley Ferrell - Junior; 13 - Tyler Alexander - Sophomore; 17 - Ryan Burnett - (redshirt) Freshman; 18 - Preston Morrison - Senior; 20 - Preston Guillory - Junior; 21 - Brian Trieglaff - (redshirt) Sophomore; 23 - Alex Young - Junior; 29 - Connor Reich - Freshman; 33 - Mitchell Traver - (redshirt) Sophomore; 36 - Matt Myers - Freshman; 40 - Trey Teakell - (redshirt) Senior; 41 - Jared Janczak - Freshman; 44 - Brian Howard - Sophomore; 47 - Drew Gooch - Freshman	Catchers: 9 - Evan Skoug - Freshman; 35 - Cullen Vaught - Freshman; 38 - Zack Plunkett - Freshman; Infielders: 3 - Elliott Barzilli - Sophomore; 5 - Derek Odell - Senior; 7 - Michael Landestoy - (redshirt) Freshman; 19 - Bradley Barnett - Freshman; 26 - Keaton Jones - Senior; 34 - Garrett Crain - Senior	Outfielders: 1 - Cody Jones - Senior; 6 - Nolan Brown - Junior; 8 - Austen Wade - Freshman; 10 - Dane Steinhagen - Junior; 16 - Connor Wanhanen - Freshman; 24 - Connor Beck - (redshirt) Freshman; 27 - Evan Williams - Junior; 32 - Jeremie Fagnan - Senior

=== Coaching staff ===
Name	Position	Seasons at TCU	Alma mater
Jim Schlossnagle	Head coach	12	Elon University (1992)
Bill Mosiello	Associate head coach	2	Fresno State University (1986)
Kirk Saarloos	Assistant coach	3	California State University, Fullerton (2001)
Zach Etheredge	Volunteer Assistant	2	University of Texas at San Antonio (2008)

=== Schlossnagle Hits Milestones ===
TCU Head Coach Jim Schlossnagle became only the second head coach in TCU Baseball history to notch a 500th win as TCU's head coach on May 1, 2015, in a 9–4 win at West Virginia. Earlier in the season, the TCU skipper earned his 200th conference win at TCU on April 11, 2015, at Kansas State.

At the conclusion of the 2015 season, Schlossnagle's 516 wins was just one victory shy of tying the all-time TCU head coach win-record set by his predecessor (the former TCU head coach, TCU alum and Southwest Conference Hall of Famer) Lance Brown, who retired in 2003 with 517 wins.

== Schedule ==
Legend
	TCU win
	TCU loss
**Bold**	TCU team member

2015 TCU Horned Frogs baseball game log
Regular season
February

Date	Opponent	Rank	Site/stadium	Score	Win	Loss	Save	Attendance	Overall record	B12 Record
February 13	Southern Illinois	#2	Lupton Stadium • Fort Worth, TX	**W** 5–0	**Morrison** (1–0)	Hauge (0–1)		4,355	1–0	–
February 14	Southern Illinois	#2	Lupton Stadium • Fort Worth, TX	**W** 14–6	**Howard** (1–0)	Pruemer (0–1)		4,164	2–0	–
February 15	Southern Illinois	#2	Lupton Stadium • Fort Worth, TX	**W** 11–0	**Young** (1–0)	Lesiak (0–1)		3,275	3–0	–
February 17	Texas–Arlington	#1	Lupton Stadium • Fort Worth, TX	**W** 4–1	**Traver** (1–0)	Laberge (0–1)		3,005	4–0	–
February 20	at #9 Arizona State	#1	Phoenix Municipal Stadium • Phoenix, AZ	**W** 3–0	**Morrison** (2–0)	Lilek (0–1)		4,077	5–0	–
February 21	at #9 Arizona State	#1	Phoenix Municipal Stadium • Phoenix, AZ	**L** 6–7	Kellogg (2–0)	**Alexander** (0–1)	Burr (3)	3,559	5–1	–
February 22	at #9 Arizona State	#1	Phoenix Municipal Stadium • Phoenix, AZ	**W** 3–2	**Burnett** (1–0)	Aboites (0–1)	**Ferrell** (1)	3,112	6–1	–
February 24	Texas Southern	#1	Lupton Stadium • Fort Worth, TX	**W** 1–0	**Traver** (2–0)	Gomez (0–2)	**Ferrell** (2)	2,788	7–1	–

March

Date	Opponent	Rank	Site/stadium	Score	Win	Loss	Save	Attendance	Overall record	B12 Record
March 3	#16 Rice	#1	Lupton Stadium • Fort Worth, TX	**W** 3–1	**Young** (2–0)	Solecitto (0–1)	**Ferrell** (3)	3,332	8–1	–
March 6	at #20 Southern California	#1	Dedeaux Field • Los Angeles, CA	**L** 6–7 ^{12}	Davis (1–0)	**Teakell** (0–1)		1,126	8–2	–
March 7	at #7 UCLA	#1	Jackie Robinson Stadium • Los Angeles, CA	**W** 3–1	**Young** (3–0)	Watson (2–1)	**Ferrell** (4)	1,558	9–2	–
March 8	vs. #4 Vanderbilt	#1	Dodger Stadium • Los Angeles, CA	**W** 4–2	**Morrison** (3–0)	Pfeifer (1–1)	**Ferrell** (5)	N/A	10–2	–
March 10	at Loyola Marymount	#1	George C. Page Stadium • Los Angeles, CA	**W** 6–2	**Howard** (2–0)	Arriaga (1–1)		258	11–2	–
March 13	Baylor	#1	Lupton Stadium • Fort Worth, TX	**W** 3–1	**Traver** (3–0)	Tolson (0–3)	**Ferrell** (6)	4,018	12–2	1–0
March 14	Baylor	#1	Lupton Stadium • Fort Worth, TX	**W** 3–2	**Morrison** (4–0)	Castano (0–3)	**Ferrell** (7)	4,259	13–2	2–0
March 15	Baylor	#1	Lupton Stadium • Fort Worth, TX	**W** 10–1	**Young** (4–0)	Stone (0–2)		4,323	14–2	3–0
March 17	Texas–Pan American	#1	Lupton Stadium • Fort Worth, TX	**W** 5–0	**Howard** (3–0)	Gallegos (1–2)		3,274	15–2	–
March 18	Texas–Pan American	#1	Lupton Stadium • Fort Worth, TX	**W** 11–5	**Alexander** (1–1)	San Nicolas (0–1)		3.083	16–2	–
March 20	#19 Oklahoma State	#1	Lupton Stadium • Fort Worth, TX	**L** 6–7 ^{12}	Glover (1–2)	**Ferrell** (0–1)		3,738	16–3	3–1
March 21	#19 Oklahoma State	#1	Lupton Stadium • Fort Worth, TX	**W** 7–4	**Morrison** (5–0)	Buffett (1–1)		3,941	17–3	4–1
March 22	#19 Oklahoma State	#1	Lupton Stadium • Fort Worth, TX	**L** 2–7	Freeman (4–0)	**Young** (4–1)		4,025	17–4	4–2
March 24	Oklahoma	#4	Lupton Stadium • Fort Worth, TX	**W** 4–3 ^{10}	**Teakell** (1–1)	Neuse (0–1)		3,696	18–4	–
March 27	Wichita State	#4	Lupton Stadium • Fort Worth, TX	**W** 14–1	**Traver** (4–0)	Hilliard (0–3)		3,871	19–4	–
March 28	Wichita State	#4	Lupton Stadium • Fort Worth, TX	**W** 8–4	**Morrison** (6–0)	Bargfeldt (2–1)		3,627	20–4	–
March 29	Wichita State	#4	Lupton Stadium • Fort Worth, TX	**W** 11–2	**Young** (5–1)	Tewes (1–2)		3,731	21–4	–
March 31	at Texas–Arlington	#2	Clay Gould Ballpark • Arlington, TX	**L** 1–8	James (2–1)	**Alexander** (1–2)		1,201	21–5	–

April

Date	Opponent	Rank	Site/stadium	Score	Win	Loss	Save	Attendance	Overall record	B12 Record
April 2	at #19 Texas Tech	#2	Rip Griffin Park • Lubbock, TX	**W** 8–0	**Traver** (5–0)	Moseley (2–3)		4,393	22–5	5–2
April 3	at #19 Texas Tech	#2	Rip Griffin Park • Lubbock, TX	**L** 1–5	Smith (4–2)	**Morrison** (6–1)		3,974	22–6	5–3
April 4	at #19 Texas Tech	#2	Rip Griffin Park • Lubbock, TX	**W** 4–1	**Young** (6–1)	Damron (2–2)	**Ferrell** (8)	4,432	23–6	6–3
April 6	at Abilene Christian	#6	Crutcher Scott Field • Abilene, TX	**W** 4–3	**Trieglaff** (1–0)	Altimont (1–5)	**Ferrell** (9)	1,588	24–6	–
April 7	#16 Dallas Baptist	#6	Lupton Stadium • Fort Worth, TX	**W** 6–2	**Alexander** (2–2)	Fritz (0–1)		3,702	25–6	–
April 10	at Kansas State	#6	Tointon Family Stadium • Manhattan, KS	**L** 4–14	Kalmus (1–2)	**Traver** (5–1)		3,081	25–7	6–4
April 11	at Kansas State	#6	Tointon Family Stadium • Manhattan, KS	**W** 9–0	**Morrison** (7–1)	Courville (0–3)		2,786	26–7	7–4
April 12	at Kansas State	#6	Tointon Family Stadium • Manhattan, KS	**L** 2–6	MaVorhis (2–0)	**Young** (6–2)		2,554	26–8	7–5
April 14	at Texas–Arlington	#8	Clay Gould Ballpark • Arlington, TX	**W** 7–1	**Alexander** (3–2)	Vassar (2–4)		664	27–8	–
April 18	Santa Clara	#8	Lupton Stadium • Fort Worth, TX	**W** 1–0	**Morrison** (8–1)	Karalus (1–4)	**Ferrell** (10)		28–8	–
April 18	Santa Clara	#8	Lupton Stadium • Fort Worth, TX	**W** 6–1	**Traver** (6–1)	Lex (2–4)		4,871	29–8	–
April 19	Santa Clara	#8	Lupton Stadium • Fort Worth, TX	**W** 9–2	**Young** (7–2)	Brisentine (2–3)		3,637	30–8	–
April 21	Incarnate Word	#7	Lupton Stadium • Fort Worth, TX	**W** 6–1	**Howard** (4–0)	Looper (1–5)	**Guillory** (1)	3,266	31–8	–
April 25	Texas	#7	Lupton Stadium • Fort Worth, TX	**W** 6–5	**Morrison** (9–1)	French (2–3)	**Ferrell** (11)	4,254	32–8	8–5
April 25	Texas	#7	Lupton Stadium • Fort Worth, TX	**W** 11–6	**Trieglaff** (2–0)	Culbreth (3–3)		5,198	33–8	9–5
April 26	Texas	#7	Lupton Stadium • Fort Worth, TX	**W** 7–1	**Young** (8–2)	Hollingsworth (3–5)		4,598	34–8	10–5
April 29	at #19 Dallas Baptist	#4	Horner Ballpark • Dallas, TX	**L** 4–6	Fritz (4–1)	**Traver** (6–2)		1,274	34–9	–

May

Date	Opponent	Rank	Site/stadium	Score	Win	Loss	Save	Attendance	Overall record	B12 Record
May 1	at West Virginia	#4	Monongalia County Ballpark • Granville, WV	**W** 9–4	**Alexander** (4–2)	Myers (2–4)		2,541	35–9	11–5
May 2	at West Virginia	#4	Monongalia County Ballpark • Granville, WV	**W** 6–2	**Morrison** (10–1)	Vance (6–4)		2,107	36–9	12–5
May 3	at West Virginia	#4	Monongalia County Ballpark • Granville, WV	**W** 5–0	**Young** (9–2)	Donato (6–5)		1,691	37–9	13–5
May 8	Kansas	#6	Lupton Stadium • Fort Worth, TX	**W** 4–2	**Morrison** (11–1)	Krauth (7–4)	**Ferrell** (12)	3,363	38–9	14–5
May 9	Kansas	#6	Lupton Stadium • Fort Worth, TX	**W** 2–1	**Ferrell** (1–1)	Villines (3–4)		3,686	39–9	15–5
May 12	Abilene Christian	#5	Lupton Stadium • Fort Worth, TX	**W** 8–2	**Traver** (7–2)	Hanson (1–3)		3,634	40–9	–
May 14	at Oklahoma	#5	L. Dale Mitchell Park • Norman, OK	**W** 5–4	**Evans** (1–0)	Evans, J. (5–1)	**Ferrell** (13)	1,113	41–9	16–5
May 15	at Oklahoma	#5	L. Dale Mitchell Park • Norman, OK	**W** 11–9	**Gooch** (1–0)	Garza (2–4)	**Ferrell** (14)	1,416	42–9	17–5
May 16	at Oklahoma	#5	L. Dale Mitchell Park • Norman, OK	**W** 4–2	**Alexander** (5–2)	Handsen (5–6)	**Guillory** (2)	1,004	43–9	18–5

Post-season
Big 12 Tournament

Date	Opponent	Rank	Site/stadium	Score	Win	Loss	Save	Attendance	Overall record	B12 Tourn. Record
May 20	Baylor	#4	ONEOK Field • Tulsa, OK	**L** 5–6	Kuntz (1–1)	**Ferrell** (1–2)		2,801	43–10	0–1
May 21	Texas Tech	#4	ONEOK Field • Tulsa, OK	**L** 1–8	Taylor (4–0)	**Morrison** (11–2)			43–11	0–2

NCAA Fort Worth Regional

Date	Opponent	Rank	Site/stadium	Score	Win	Loss	Save	Attendance	Overall record	NCAA Tourn. Record	Regional Record
May 29	Sacred Heart	#4	Lupton Stadium • Fort Worth, TX	**W** 10–0	**Traver** (8–2)	Cooksey (7–3)		3,662	44–11	1–0	1–0
May 30	NC State	#4	Lupton Stadium • Fort Worth, TX	**L** 4–5	Orwig (2–0)	**Ferrell** (1–3)		4,009	44–12	1–1	1–1
May 31	Stony Brook	#4	Lupton Stadium • Fort Worth, TX	**W** 8–3	**Guillory** (1–0)	Rodliff (1–2)		3,315	45–12	2–1	2–1
May 31	NC State	#4	Lupton Stadium • Fort Worth, TX	**W** 8–2	**Alexander** (6–2)	Williamson (4–4)		3,480	46–12	3–1	3–1
June 1	NC State	#4	Lupton Stadium • Fort Worth, TX	**W** 9–8 ^{10}	**Trieglaff** (3–0)	Britt (3–1)		4,277	47–12	4–1	4–1

NCAA Fort Worth Super Regional

Date	Opponent	Rank	Site/stadium	Score	Win	Loss	Save	Attendance	Overall record	NCAA Tourn. Record	Super Reg. Record
June 6	#9 Texas A&M	#4	Lupton Stadium • Fort Worth, TX	**W** 13–4	**Teakell** (2–1)	Long (9–1)		7,199	48–12	5–1	1–0
June 7	#9 Texas A&M	#4	Lupton Stadium • Fort Worth, TX	**L** 1–2 ^{10}	Hendrix (6–3)	**Morrison** (11–3)		7,383	48–13	5–2	1–1
June 8	#11 Texas A&M	#3	Lupton Stadium • Fort Worth, TX	**W** 5–4 ^{16}	**Traver** (9–2)	Hendrix (6–4)		7,294	49–13	6–2	2–1

NCAA College World Series

Date	Opponent	Rank	Site/stadium	Score	Win	Loss	Save	Attendance	Overall record	NCAAT Record	CWS Record
June 14	#1 LSU	#3	TD Ameritrade Park • Omaha, NE	**W** 10–3	**Morrison** (12–3)	Poche' (9–2)		24,506	50–13	7–2	1–0
June 16	#5 Vanderbilt	#3	TD Ameritrade Park • Omaha, NE	**L** 0–1	Pfeifer (6–4)	**Young** (9–3)	Wright (4)	24,156	50–14	7–3	1–1
June 18	#1 LSU	#3	TD Ameritrade Park • Omaha, NE	**W** 8–4	**Teakell** (3–1)	Bain (2–3)		26,803	51–14	8–3	2–1
June 19	#5 Vanderbilt	#3	TD Ameritrade Park • Omaha, NE	**L** 1–7	Buehler (5–2)	**Alexander** (6–3)		26,011	51–15	8–4	2–2

All rankings from Collegiate Baseball.

== Rankings ==
Ranking movements Legend: ██ Increase in ranking ██ Decrease in ranking
	Week																		
Poll	Pre	1	2	3	4	5	6	7	8	9	10	11	12	13	14	15	16	17	Final
Coaches'	3	3*	3	3	3	2	1	4	2	4	6	5	5	4	3	2	4	4	4
Baseball America	7	7	7	7	7	4	3	5	5	4	6	5	5	5	5	5	7	7	4
Collegiate Baseball^	2	2	1	1	1	1	1	4	2	6	8	7	4	6	5	4	4	3	4
NCBWA†	3	3	2	2	2	2	1	4	3	5	7	6	4	3	3	2	5	5	4
D1Baseball	8	8	7	6	6	2	2	5	4	3	8	7	5	5	4	4	4	4	4

^ Collegiate Baseball ranked 40 teams in their preseason poll, but only ranked 30 teams weekly during the season.
† NCBWA ranks 30 teams in their preseason poll, but only ranks 25 teams weekly during the season.
* A new poll was not released for this week, so for comparison purposes, the previous week's ranking is inserted in this week's slot.

== Awards and honors ==
Tyler Alexander

- NCAA Fort Worth Regional All-Tournament Team
- Honorable Mention All Big 12
- Third Team Preseason All-American (NCBWA)

Nolan Brown

- NCAA Fort Worth Regional All-Tournament Team
- Honorable Mention All Big 12

Garrett Crain

- NCAA Fort Worth Regional All-Tournament Team

Jeremie Fagnan

- Honorable Mention All Big 12

Riley Ferrell

- NCBWA First Team All American
- Louisville Slugger Second Team All-American
- Dick Howser Trophy Award Semifinalist
- NCBHOF National Pitcher of the Year Watch List
- Golden Spikes Award Watch List
- NCBWA Stopper of the Year Watch List
- First Team All Big 12
- Louisville Slugger Pre-season National Player of the Year
- Louisville Slugger Pre-season First team All-American
- Perfect Game USA Pre-season First team All-American
- Baseball America Pre-season First team All-American

Cody Jones

- D1 Baseball Second Team All-American
- NCBWA Third Team All-American
- Baseball America Third Team All-American
- NCAA Fort Worth Regional All-Tournament Team
- Big 12 Player of the Year
- All Big 12 First Team
- Big 12 Hitter of the Week (Mar. 15)

Keaton Jones

- Second Team All Big 12
- Brooks Wallace Award Watch List

Preston Morrison

- Louisville Slugger Second Team All-American
- NCBWA Second Team All-American
- Dick Howser Trophy Award Semifinalist
- NCBWA & Louisville Slugger National Pitcher of the Week (Feb. 23)
- NCBHOF National Pitcher of the Year Watch List
- NCAA Fort Worth Regional All-Tournament Team
- First Team All Big 12
- Big 12 Pitcher of the Week (Feb. 23, Apr. 13)
- Golden Spikes Award Watch List
- Louisville Slugger Pre-season First team All-American
- Perfect Game USA Pre-season Second team All-American

Derek Odell

- NCAA Fort Worth Regional All-Tournament Team
- Honorable Mention All Big 12

Jim Schlossnagle

- Big 12 Coach of the Year

Evan Skoug

- NCAA Fort Worth Regional All-Tournament Team
- Big 12 All-Freshman Team
- Honorable Mention All Big 12

Dane Steinhagen

- Honorable Mention All Big 12

Trey Teakell

- Honorable Mention All Big 12

Mitchell Traver

- Honorable Mention All Big 12
- Golden Spikes Award Watch List

Connor Wanhanen

- Big 12 Freshman of the Year
- First Team All Big 12
- Big 12 All-Freshman Team
- Big 12 Newcomer of the Week (Apr. 20)

Alex Young

- Louisville Slugger Second Team All-American
- NCBWA Third Team All-American
- All Big 12 First Team
- Big 12 Pitcher of the Week (Mar. 9)
- NCBHOF National Pitcher of the Year Watch List
