= 2015 Kansas Jayhawks baseball team =

American college baseball season

2015 Kansas Jayhawks baseball
- Conference: Big 12 Conference
- Record: 23–32 (8–15 Big 12)
- Head coach: Ritch Price (13th season)
- Assistant coaches: Ryan Graves (13th season); Ritchie Price (4th season)
- Home stadium: Hoglund Ballpark

2015 Big 12 Conference baseball standings
	Conf.				Overall
Team	W		L	PCT	W		L	PCT
No. 4 TCU ‍†‍‍^{y}	18	–	5	.783	51	–	15	.773
No. 19 Oklahoma State ‍‍‍^{y}	14	–	8	.636	38	–	20	.655
Oklahoma ‍‍‍	13	–	11	.542	34	–	27	.557
Texas Tech ‍‍‍	13	–	11	.542	31	–	24	.564
Texas ‍‍‡‍^{y}	11	–	13	.458	30	–	27	.526
Kansas State ‍‍‍	10	–	14	.417	27	–	30	.474
West Virginia ‍‍‍	9	–	13	.409	27	–	27	.500
Baylor ‍‍‍	9	–	15	.375	23	–	32	.418
Kansas ‍‍‍	8	–	15	.348	23	–	32	.418
† – Conference champion ‡ – Tournament champion y – Invited to the NCAA tournament Rankings from Collegiate Baseball

The 2015 Kansas Jayhawks baseball team represented the University of Kansas during the 2015 NCAA Division I baseball season. The Jayhawks played their home games at Hoglund Ballpark as a member of the Big 12 Conference. They were led by head coach Ritch Price, in his 13th season at Kansas.

== Previous season ==
In 2014, the Jayhawks finished the season 3rd in the Big 12 with a record of 36–26, 15–9 in conference play. They qualified for the 2014 Big 12 Conference baseball tournament, and were eliminated in the first round. They qualified for the 2014 NCAA Division I baseball tournament, and were placed in the Louisville Regional, with the host Louisville Cardinals, Kentucky, and Kent State. In their opening game, the Jayhawks defeated Kentucky, 10–6, but then fell to Louisville by a score of 3–6. In the loser's bracket, the Wildcats got revenge and defeated the Jayhawks, 8–6, to eliminate Kansas from the tournament.

== Personnel ==
=== Roster ===
2015 Kansas Jayhawks roster
Pitchers: 10 - Jon Hander - Sophomore; 12 - Ryan Ralston - Freshman; 17 - Brandon Johnson - Freshman; 19 - Casey Douglas - Freshman; 21 - Sean Rackoski - Sophomore; 22 - Ben Krauth - Junior; 26 - Tyler Davis - Sophomore; 27 - Colin Toalson - Senior; 29 - Sam Gilbert - Junior; 32 - Ryan Jackson - Freshman; 37 - Tyler Condie - Junior; 38 - Hayden Edwards - Junior; 40 - Stephen Villines - Junior; 42 - Drew Morovick - Senior; 44 - Blake Weiman - Freshman; 46 - Jeremy Kravetz - Sophomore; 48 - Steve Goldstein - Junior	Catchers: 8 - TJ Martin - Freshman; 11 - Tanner Gragg - Freshman; 34 - Michael Tinsley - Sophomore; 35 - John Remick - Sophomore; Infielders: 4 - Owen Taylor - Freshman; 5 - Matt McLaughlin - Freshman; 15 - Tommy Mirabelli - Junior; 20 - Justin Protacio - Senior; 23 - Ryan Pidhaichuk - Junior; 24 - Colby Wright - Junior; 25 - Jacob Boylan - Junior; 33 - Marcus Wheeler - (redshirt) Sophomore	Outfielders: 1 - Joven Afenir - Sophomore; 3 - Dakota Smith - Senior; 7 - Connor McKay - Senior; 9 - Blair Beck - Senior; 14 - Joe Moroney - (redshirt) Junior; 30 - MJ Farthing - Sophomore; 39 - Joe Luvisi - Senior; 48 - Steve Goldstein - Junior

=== Coaching staff ===
Name	Position	Seasons at Kansas	Alma mater
Ritch Price	Head coach	13	Willamette University (1978)
Gino DiMare	Assistant coach	13	Oklahoma State University (1996)
J. D. Arteaga	Assistant coach	4	University of Kansas (2007)

== Schedule ==
Legend
	Kansas win
	Kansas loss
	Postponement
**Bold**	Kansas team member

2015 Kansas Jayhawks baseball game log
Regular season

February
#	Date	Opponent	Rank	Site/stadium	Score	Win	Loss	Save	Attendance	Overall record	B12 Record
1	February 13	at #4 LSU		Alex Box Stadium • Baton Rouge, LA							
2	February 14	at #4 LSU		Alex Box Stadium • Baton Rouge, LA							
3	February 15	at #4 LSU		Alex Box Stadium • Baton Rouge, LA							
4	February 19	vs. Washington		Sloan Park • Mesa, AZ							
5	February 20	vs. Utah		Sloan Park • Mesa, AZ							
6	February 21	vs. Washington State		Surprise Stadium • Surprise, AZ							
7	February 22	vs. Oregon State		Surprise Stadium • Surprise, AZ							
8	February 26	vs. Chicago State		North Charlotte Regional Park • Port Charlotte, FL							
9	February 27	vs. North Dakota State		North Charlotte Regional Park • Port Charlotte, FL							
10	February 28	vs. Northeastern		North Charlotte Regional Park • Port Charlotte, FL							

March
#	Date	Opponent	Rank	Site/stadium	Score	Win	Loss	Save	Attendance	Overall record	B12 Record
11	March 1	vs. Boston College		North Charlotte Regional Park • Port Charlotte, FL							
12	March 3	at Grand Canyon		Brazell Stadium • Phoenix, AZ							
13	March 4	at Grand Canyon		Brazell Stadium • Phoenix, AZ							
14	March 6	Utah		Hoglund Ballpark • Lawrence, KS							
15	March 7	Utah		Hoglund Ballpark • Lawrence, KS							
16	March 8	Utah		Hoglund Ballpark • Lawrence, KS							
17	March 10	Central Michigan		Hoglund Ballpark • Lawrence, KS							
18	March 13	Michigan		Hoglund Ballpark • Lawrence, KS							
19	March 14	Michigan		Hoglund Ballpark • Lawrence, KS							
20	March 15	Michigan		Hoglund Ballpark • Lawrence, KS							
21	March 20	Iowa		Hoglund Ballpark • Lawrence, KS							
22	March 21	Iowa		Hoglund Ballpark • Lawrence, KS							
23	March 22	Iowa		Hoglund Ballpark • Lawrence, KS							
24	March 24	at Missouri State		Hammons Field • Springfield, MO							
25	March 27	at Texas Tech		Rip Griffin Park • Lubbock, TX							
26	March 28	at Texas Tech		Rip Griffin Park • Lubbock, TX							
27	March 29	at Texas Tech		Rip Griffin Park • Lubbock, TX							

April
#	Date	Opponent	Rank	Site/stadium	Score	Win	Loss	Save	Attendance	Overall record	B12 Record
28	April 1	at Wichita State		Eck Stadium • Wichita, KS							
29	April 2	at Oklahoma		L. Dale Mitchell Park • Norman, OK							
30	April 3	at Oklahoma		L. Dale Mitchell Park • Norman, OK							
31	April 4	at Oklahoma		L. Dale Mitchell Park • Norman, OK							
32	April 7	New Mexico		Hoglund Ballpark • Lawrence, KS							
33	April 8	New Mexico		Hoglund Ballpark • Lawrence, KS							
34	April 10	Oklahoma State		Hoglund Ballpark • Lawrence, KS							
35	April 11	Oklahoma State		Hoglund Ballpark • Lawrence, KS							
36	April 12	Oklahoma State		Hoglund Ballpark • Lawrence, KS							
37	April 15	Missouri State		Hoglund Ballpark • Lawrence, KS							
38	April 17	Texas		Hoglund Ballpark • Lawrence, KS							
39	April 18	Texas		Hoglund Ballpark • Lawrence, KS							
40	April 19	Texas		Hoglund Ballpark • Lawrence, KS							
41	April 21	Wichita State		Hoglund Ballpark • Lawrence, KS							
42	April 24	at West Virginia		Monongalia County Ballpark • Granville, WV							
43	April 25	at West Virginia		Monongalia County Ballpark • Granville, WV							
44	April 26	at West Virginia		Monongalia County Ballpark • Granville, WV							
45	April 29	Arkansas–Pine Bluff		Hoglund Ballpark • Lawrence, KS							

May
#	Date	Opponent	Rank	Site/stadium	Score	Win	Loss	Save	Attendance	Overall record	B12 Record
46	May 1	Baylor		Hoglund Ballpark • Lawrence, KS							
47	May 2	Baylor		Hoglund Ballpark • Lawrence, KS							
48	May 3	Baylor		Hoglund Ballpark • Lawrence, KS							
49	May 5	at Northwestern		Rocky Miller Park • Evanston, IL							
50	May 6	at Northwestern		Rocky Miller Park • Evanston, IL							
51	May 8	at TCU		Lupton Stadium • Fort Worth, TX							
52	May 9	at TCU		Lupton Stadium • Fort Worth, TX							
53	May 10	at TCU		Lupton Stadium • Fort Worth, TX							
54	May 15	Kansas State		Hoglund Ballpark • Lawrence, KS							
55	May 16	Kansas State		Hoglund Ballpark • Lawrence, KS							
56	May 17	Kansas State		Hoglund Ballpark • Lawrence, KS							

Postseason

Big 12 Tournament
#	Date	Opponent	Rank	Site/stadium	Score	Win	Loss	Save	Attendance	Overall record	Tourn. Record
		TBD		ONEOK Field • Tulsa, OK							
		TBD		ONEOK Field • Tulsa, OK							

All rankings from Collegiate Baseball.
