= 2015 Texas Tech Red Raiders baseball team =

American college baseball season

2015 Texas Tech Red Raiders baseball
- Conference: Big 12 Conference
- Record: 31–24 (13–11 Big 12)
- Head coach: Tim Tadlock (3rd season)
- Assistant coaches: Ray Hayward (3rd season); J-Bob Thomas (3rd season)
- Home stadium: Dan Law Field at Rip Griffin Park

2015 Big 12 Conference baseball standings
	Conf.				Overall
Team	W		L	PCT	W		L	PCT
No. 4 TCU ‍†‍‍^{y}	18	–	5	.783	51	–	15	.773
No. 19 Oklahoma State ‍‍‍^{y}	14	–	8	.636	38	–	20	.655
Oklahoma ‍‍‍	13	–	11	.542	34	–	27	.557
Texas Tech ‍‍‍	13	–	11	.542	31	–	24	.564
Texas ‍‍‡‍^{y}	11	–	13	.458	30	–	27	.526
Kansas State ‍‍‍	10	–	14	.417	27	–	30	.474
West Virginia ‍‍‍	9	–	13	.409	27	–	27	.500
Baylor ‍‍‍	9	–	15	.375	23	–	32	.418
Kansas ‍‍‍	8	–	15	.348	23	–	32	.418
† – Conference champion ‡ – Tournament champion y – Invited to the NCAA tournament Rankings from Collegiate Baseball

The 2015 Texas Tech Red Raiders baseball team represented Texas Tech University during the 2015 NCAA Division I baseball season. The Red Raiders played their home games at Dan Law Field at Rip Griffin Park as a member of the Big 12 Conference. They were led by head coach Tim Tadlock in his 3rd season at Texas Tech.

== Previous season ==
In 2014, the Red Raiders finished the season 4th in the Big 12 with a record of 45–21, 14–10 in conference play. They qualified for the 2014 Big 12 Conference baseball tournament, and were eliminated in the first round. They qualified for the 2014 NCAA Division I baseball tournament, and were placed in the Coral Gables regional, along with host Miami (FL), Columbia, and Bethune-Cookman. In their first game, the Red Raiders defeated Columbia, 3–2, and advanced to the next leg, where they defeated Miami (FL), 3–0. In the regional final, Texas Tech was again matched up with Miami, and dropped the first game by a score of 1–2 in 10 innings. In the second game, the Red Raiders rebounded to beat the Hurricanes 4–0 and advanced to the Super Regional. As hosts of the Super Regional, the Red Raiders defeated College of Charleston in two games, both by a score of 1–0, to advance to their first ever College World Series.

In the College World Series, Texas Tech was eliminated quickly, after only two games, losing first to conference opponent TCU, 2–3, then to Ole Miss, 1–2. They finished the season with a record of 45–21.

== Personnel ==
=== Roster ===
2015 Texas Tech Red Raiders roster
Pitchers: 5 – Patrick Mahomes II – Freshman; 13 – Dalton Brown – Junior; 14 – Dominic Moreno – Senior; 18 – Quinn Carpenter – Junior; 19 – Jackson Lancaster – Freshman; 20 – Cameron Smith – Senior; 32 – Justin Bethurd – Junior; 34 – Corey Taylor – Senior; 35 – Matt Withrow – Junior; 36 – Ty Damron – Sophomore; 37 – Matt Custred – Junior; 38 – Johnathon Tripp – Junior; 41 – Dylan Dusek – Sophomore; 42 – Parker Mushinski – Freshman; 43 – Garrett Bruce – Junior; 44 – Ryan Moseley – Sophomore; 45 – Heath Herrington – (redshirt) Senior; 48 – Sean Thompson – Sophomore; 55 – Jacob Patterson – Freshman	Catchers: 15 – Kholeton Sanchez – Junior; 16 – Tyler Floyd – Junior; 26 – Hunter Southerland – Sophomore; 31 – Nick Marshall – Junior; Infielders: 1 – Tim Proudfoot – Senior; 2 – Orlando Garcia – Freshman; 3 – Michael Davis – Freshman; 4 – Cory Raley – Junior; 7 – Ryan Long – Sophomore; 8 – Tanner Gardner – Freshman; 9 – William Hairston – Sophomore; 12 – Eric Gutierrez – Junior; 21 – Bryant Burleson – Senior; 25 – Hunter Hargrove – Sophomore; 28 – Landon Darwin – Junior	Outfielders: 10 – Tyler Neslony – Junior; 11 – Stephen Smith – Sophomore; 17 – Zach Davis – Junior; 29 – Anthony Lyons – Sophomore

=== Coaching staff ===
Name	Position	Seasons at Texas Tech	Alma mater
Tim Tadlock	Head coach	3	Texas Tech University (1992)
Ray Hayward	Assistant coach	3	University of Oklahoma (1983)
J-Bob Thomas	Assistant coach	3	Abilene Christian University (2005)

== Season ==
=== February ===
Texas Tech opened its season with a four-game series against West Coast Conference foe San Francisco. In the opening game of the series on February 13, the Red Raiders rebounded from an early 0–3 deficit, but scored six runs in the third inning, powering their way to a 9–7 Opening Day victory.

== Schedule ==
2015 Texas Tech Red Raiders baseball game log: 31–24
Regular Season: 30–22
February: 9–1

Date	Time	Opponent	Rank	Site/stadium	Score	Win	Loss	Save	Attendance	Overall record	Big 12 Record	Ref
February 13	2:00 PM	San Francisco	#9	Dan Law Field at Rip Griffin Park • Lubbock, TX	9–7	**Patterson** (1–0)	Shew (0–1)	—	4,375	1–0	—	
February 14	12:00 PM	San Francisco	#9	Dan Law Field at Rip Griffin Park • Lubbock, TX	15–6	**Mushinski** (1–0)	Rincon (0–1)	—	4,200	2–0	—	
February 14	4:00 PM	San Francisco	#9	Dan Law Field at Rip Griffin Park • Lubbock, TX	13–5	**Dusek** (1–0)	Lee (0–1)	—	4,418	3–0	—	
February 15	12:00 PM	San Francisco	#9	Dan Law Field at Rip Griffin Park • Lubbock, TX	9–7	**Damron** (1–0)	Cecilio (0–1)	**Moreno** (1)	3,192	4–0	—	
February 17	2:00 PM	Nevada	#7	Dan Law Field at Rip Griffin Park • Lubbock, TX	4–8	Held (1–0)	**Moreno** (0–1)	—	2,796	4–1	—	
February 20	2:00 PM	Northern Illinois	#7	Dan Law Field at Rip Griffin Park • Lubbock, TX	8–0	**Moseley** (1–0)	Neumann (0–1)	—	3,200	5–1	—	
February 20	5:15 PM	Northern Illinois	#7	Dan Law Field at Rip Griffin Park • Lubbock, TX	5–0	**Smith** (1–0)	Fuller (1–1)	**Moreno** (2)	3,572	6–1	—	
February 21	12:00 PM	Northern Illinois	#7	Dan Law Field at Rip Griffin Park • Lubbock, TX	6–4	**Dusek** (2–0)	Ormsby (1–1)	**Taylor** (1)	3,875	7–1	—	
February 21	3:05 PM	Northern Illinois	#7	Dan Law Field at Rip Griffin Park • Lubbock, TX	6–0	**Damron** (2–0)	Ceja (0–1)	—	4,086	8–1	—	
February 25	7:00 PM	Sacramento State	#7	Dan Law Field at Rip Griffin Park • Lubbock, TX	4–3	**Moreno** (1–1)	Dillon (2–2)	—	2,921	9–1	—	

March: 9–10

Date	Time	Opponent	Rank	Site/stadium	Score	Win	Loss	Save	Attendance	Overall record	Big 12 Record	Ref
March 3	3:30 PM	Abilene Christian	#6	Dan Law Field at Rip Griffin Park • Lubbock, TX	6–5 (16)	**Tripp** (1–0)	Gawrieh (0–2)	—	2,756	10–1	—	
March 6	9:00 PM	at #30 Cal State Fullerton	#6	Goodwin Field • Fullerton	0–4	Eshelman (2–2)	**Smith** (1–1)	—	1,777	10–2	—	
March 7	9:00 PM	at #30 Cal State Fullerton	#6	Goodwin Field • Fullerton	2–3	Garza (1–0)	**Moseley** (1–1)	Peitzmeier (5)	2,640	10–3	—	
March 8	3:00 PM	at #30 Cal State Fullerton	#6	Goodwin Field • Fullerton	5–6	Gavin (2–0)	**Dusek** (2–1)	Peitzmeier (6)	1,623	10–4	—	
March 10	6:30 PM	New Mexico State	#15	Dan Law Field at Rip Griffin Park • Lubbock, TX	4–3 (12)	**Mushinski** (2–0)	Herendeen (0–1)	—	3,587	11–4	—	
March 11	2:00 PM	New Mexico State	#15	Dan Law Field at Rip Griffin Park • Lubbock, TX	7–4	**Brown** (1–0)	Mansfiled (0–1)	**Taylor** (2)	3,074	12–4	—	
March 13	8:00 PM	at San Diego State	#15	Tony Gwynn Stadium • San Diego, CA	0–9	Derby (2–1)	**Moseley** (1–2)	—	568	12–5	—	
March 14	4:00 PM	at San Diego State	#15	Tony Gwynn Stadium • San Diego, CA	11–0	**Smith** (2–1)	Thompson (1–1)	—	473	13–5	—	
March 15	3:00 PM	at San Diego State	#15	Tony Gwynn Stadium • San Diego, CA	6–3	**Taylor** (1–0)	Seyler (4–1)	**Moreno** (3)	553	14–5	—	
March 17	6:30 PM	Oral Roberts	#13	Dan Law Field at Rip Griffin Park • Lubbock, TX	7–9 (11)	Holley (1–0)	**Moreno** (1–2)	McDavid (1)	2,906	14–6	—	
March 18	2:00 PM	Oral Roberts	#13	Dan Law Field at Rip Griffin Park • Lubbock, TX	7–4	**Patterson** (2–0)	Howe (0–1)	—	3,327	15–6	—	
March 20	6:00 PM	at Oklahoma	#13	L. Dale Mitchell Baseball Park • Norman, OK	6–1	**Moseley** (2–2)	Elliott (3–2)	—	1,227	16–6	1–0	
March 21	2:02 PM	at Oklahoma	#13	L. Dale Mitchell Baseball Park • Norman, OK	2–5	Hansen (3–2)	**Smith** (2–2)	—	1,313	16–7	1–1	
March 22	1:00 PM	at Oklahoma	#13	L. Dale Mitchell Baseball Park • Norman, OK	2–3	Tasin (4–1)	**Moreno** (1–3)	Evans (2)	1,412	16–8	1–2	
March 24	2:00 PM	New Mexico		Dan Law Field at Rip Griffin Park • Lubbock, TX	6–7	Presto (2–1)	**Damron** (2–1)	Schilling (1)	3,091	16–9	—	
March 27	6:30 PM	Kansas		Dan Law Field at Rip Griffin Park • Lubbock, TX	4–7	Krauth (5–2)	**Mushinski** (2–1)	Villines (7)	3,595	16–10	1–3	
March 28	2:00 PM	Kansas		Dan Law Field at Rip Griffin Park • Lubbock, TX	9–3	**Smith** (3–2)	Weiman (0–4)	—	3,861	17–10	2–3	
March 29	1:00 PM	Kansas		Dan Law Field at Rip Griffin Park • Lubbock, TX	3–2	**Taylor** (2–0)	Villines (1–1)	**Moreno** (4)	3,812	18–10	3–3	
March 31	3:00 PM	at New Mexico		Lobo Field • Albuquerque, NM	5–6	Estrella (1–1)	**Brown** (1–1)	Sanchez (2)	1,106	18–11	—	

April: 9–8

Date	Time	Opponent	Rank	Site/stadium	Score	Win	Loss	Save	Attendance	Overall record	Big 12 Record	Ref
April 2	6:30 PM	#2 TCU		Dan Law Field at Rip Griffin Park • Lubbock, TX	0–8	Traver (5–0)	**Moseley** (2–3)	—	4,393	18–12	3–4	
April 3	2:00 PM	#2 TCU		Dan Law Field at Rip Griffin Park • Lubbock, TX	5–1	**Smith** (4–2)	Morrison (6–1)	—	3,974	19–12	4–4	
April 4	2:00 PM	#2 TCU		Dan Law Field at Rip Griffin Park • Lubbock, TX	1–4	Young (6–1)	**Damron** (2–2)	Ferrell (8)	4,432	19–13	4–5	
April 7	2:00 PM	at Oral Roberts		J. L. Johnson Stadium • Tulsa, OK	4–5	Hightower (1–0)	**Custred** (0–1)	Sequeira (4)	551	19–14	—	
April 10	6:30 PM	Baylor		Dan Law Field at Rip Griffin Park • Lubbock, TX	8–4	**Moseley** (3–3)	Castano (2–4)	—	3,974	20–14	5–5	
April 11	2:00 PM	Baylor		Dan Law Field at Rip Griffin Park • Lubbock, TX	3–2 (12)	**Moreno** (2–3)	Montemayor (0–3)	—	4,387	21–14	6–5	
April 12	2:00 PM	Baylor		Dan Law Field at Rip Griffin Park • Lubbock, TX	9–5	**Damron** (3–2)	Lewis (1–1)	—	3,573	22–14	7–5	
April 14	6:30 PM	at Abilene Christian	#27	Crutcher Scott Field • Abilene, TX	7–6	**Withrow** (1–0)	Hanson (1–1)	**Moreno** (5)	1,537	23–14	—	
April 17	3:00 PM	at Kansas State	#27	Tointon Family Stadium • Manhattan, KS	3–5	Erickson (1–2)	**Moseley** (3–4)	Fischer (1)	2,631	23–15	7–6	
April 18	2:00 PM	at Kansas State	#27	Tointon Family Stadium • Manhattan, KS	7–1	**Smith** (5–2)	Courville (0–4)	—	2,864	24–15	8–6	
April 19	1:00 PM	at Kansas State	#27	Tointon Family Stadium • Manhattan, KS	4–1	**Taylor** (3–0)	Griep (3–2)	**Moreno** (6)	1,780	25–15	9–6	
April 21	6:30 PM	vs. Abilene Christian	#24	Security Bank Ballpark • Midland, TX	10–2	**Custred** (1–1)	Zotkya (2–2)	—	3,512	26–15	—	
April 24	6:30 PM	#9 Oklahoma State	#24	Dan Law Field at Rip Griffin Park • Lubbock, TX	5–3	**Moseley** (4–4)	Perrin (4–4)	**Moreno** (7)	4,025	27–15	10–6	
April 25	2:00 PM	#9 Oklahoma State	#24	Dan Law Field at Rip Griffin Park • Lubbock, TX	2–8	Freeman (7–2)	**Smith** (5–3)	—	4,423	27–16	10–7	
April 26	2:00 PM	#9 Oklahoma State	#24	Dan Law Field at Rip Griffin Park • Lubbock, TX	3–6	LaRue (2–0)	**Withrow** (1–1)	Glover (5)	4,171	27–17	10–8	
April 28	6:30 PM	Grand Canyon	#28	Dan Law Field at Rip Griffin Park • Lubbock, TX	4–5 (10)	Garcia-Pierre (1–0)	**Custred** (1–2)	—	3,126	27–18	—	
April 29	2:00 PM	Grand Canyon	#28	Dan Law Field at Rip Griffin Park • Lubbock, TX	5–10	Vorhof (4–0)	**Tripp** (1–1)	Brendel (2)	3,113	27–19	—	

May: 3–3

Date	Time	Opponent	Rank	Site/stadium	Score	Win	Loss	Save	Attendance	Overall record	Big 12 Record	Ref
May 1	6:00 PM	at Texas	#28	UFCU Disch–Falk Field • Austin, TX	0–3	French (3–3)	**Moseley** (4–3)	Mayes (2)	5,261	27–20	10–9	
May 2	2:00 PM	at Texas	#28	UFCU Disch–Falk Field • Austin, TX	9–1	**Smith** (6–3)	Culbreth (3–4)	—	7,018	28–20	11–9	
May 3	1:00 PM	at Texas	#28	UFCU Disch–Falk Field • Austin, TX	5–1	**Moreno** (3–3)	Mayes (1–4)	—	6,284	29–20	12–9	
May 14	5:00 PM	at West Virginia		Monongalia County Ballpark • Granville, WV	4–6	Donato (7–5)	**Moseley** (4–6)	Dotson (1)	1,384	29–21	12–10	
May 15	5:00 PM	at West Virginia		Monongalia County Ballpark • Granville, WV	2–8	Vance (7–4)	**Smith** (6–4)	—	1,883	29–22	12–11	
May 16	5:00 PM	at West Virginia		Monongalia County Ballpark • Granville, WV	8–2	**Damron** (4–2)	Myers (2–5)	—	1,697	30–22	13–11	

Post–season: 1–2
Big 12 Tournament: 1–2

Date	Time	Opponent	Rank	Site/stadium	Score	Win	Loss	Save	Attendance	Overall record	B12T Record	Ref
May 20	9:00 AM	vs. (5) Texas	(4)	ONEOK Field • Tulsa, OK	1–2	French (4–3)	**Smith** (6–5)	—	2,801	30–23	0–1	
May 21	9:00 AM	vs. #4 (1) TCU	(4)	ONEOK Field • Tulsa, OK	8–1	**Taylor** (4–0)	Morrison (11–2)	—	2,960	31–23	1–1	
May 22	3:15 PM	vs. (8) Baylor	(4)	ONEOK Field • Tulsa, OK	4–5	Lewis (4–2)	**Dusek** (2–2)	Spicer (8)	3,645	31–24	1–2	

Legend: = Win = Loss = Postponement
Bold = Texas Tech team member
"#" represents ranking. All rankings from Collegiate Baseball on the date of the contest.
"()" represents postseason seeding in the Big 12 Tournament.

== Rankings ==
Ranking movements Legend: ██ Increase in ranking ██ Decrease in ranking — = Not ranked RV = Received votes
	Week																		
Poll	Pre	1	2	3	4	5	6	7	8	9	10	11	12	13	14	15	16	17	Final
Coaches'	13	13*	13	10	16	15	21	24	RV	RV	24	24	RV	RV	RV	RV	—	—	—
Baseball America	5	5	5	5	14	12	18	19	—	25	22	—	—	—	—	—	—	—	—
Collegiate Baseball^	9	7	7	6	15	13	—	—	—	27	24	28	—	—	—	—	—	—	—
NCBWA†	12	8	9	7	13	10	17	21	23	19	18	21	25	29	RV	RV	—	—	—

^ Collegiate Baseball ranked 40 teams in their preseason poll, but only ranked 30 teams weekly during the season.
† NCBWA ranks 30 teams in their preseason poll, but only ranks 25 teams weekly during the season.
* A new poll was not released for this week, so for comparison purposes, the previous week's ranking is inserted in this week's slot.

== Awards and honors ==
Eric Gutierrez

- Louisville Slugger Pre-season First Team All-American
- Perfect Game USA Pre-season Second Team All-American
