= 2015 Big 12 Conference baseball tournament =

American college baseball tournament

- Teams: 8
- Format: Double-elimination tournament
- Finals site: ONEOK Field; Tulsa, OK
- Champions: Texas (5th title)
- Winning coach: Augie Garrido (5th title)
- MVP: Zane Gurwitz (Texas)
- Television: Bracket Play: FCS Central; Championship: Fox Sports 1

2015 Big 12 Conference baseball standings
	Conf.				Overall
Team	W		L	PCT	W		L	PCT
No. 4 TCU ‍†‍‍^{y}	18	–	5	.783	51	–	15	.773
No. 19 Oklahoma State ‍‍‍^{y}	14	–	8	.636	38	–	20	.655
Oklahoma ‍‍‍	13	–	11	.542	34	–	27	.557
Texas Tech ‍‍‍	13	–	11	.542	31	–	24	.564
Texas ‍‍‡‍^{y}	11	–	13	.458	30	–	27	.526
Kansas State ‍‍‍	10	–	14	.417	27	–	30	.474
West Virginia ‍‍‍	9	–	13	.409	27	–	27	.500
Baylor ‍‍‍	9	–	15	.375	23	–	32	.418
Kansas ‍‍‍	8	–	15	.348	23	–	32	.418
† – Conference champion ‡ – Tournament champion y – Invited to the NCAA tournament Rankings from Collegiate Baseball

The 2015 Big 12 Conference baseball tournament was held from May 20 through 24 at ONEOK Field in Tulsa, Oklahoma. The annual tournament determines the conference champion of the Division I Big 12 Conference for college baseball. The winner of the tournament will earn the league's automatic bid to the 2015 NCAA Division I baseball tournament.

The tournament has been held since 1997, the inaugural year of the Big 12 Conference. Among current league members, Texas has won the most championships with five, winning again in 2015. Among original members, Baylor and Kansas State have never won the event. Iowa State discontinued their program after the 2001 season without having won a title. Having joined in 2013, TCU won their first title in 2014 while West Virginia has yet to win the Tournament.

== Format and seeding ==
The top eight finishers from the regular season will be seeded one through eight, and will then play a two-bracket double-elimination tournament leading to a winner-take-all championship game.

Place	Seed	Team	Conference				Overall		
Place	Seed	Team	W	L	%	GB	W	L	%
1	1	TCU	18	5	.783	–	51	15	.773
2	2	Oklahoma State	14	8	.636	3.5	38	20	.655
3	3	Oklahoma	13	11	.542	5.5	34	27	.557
3	4	Texas Tech	13	11	.542	5.5	31	24	.564
5	5	Texas	11	13	.458	7.5	30	27	.526
6	6	Kansas State	10	14	.417	8.5	27	30	.474
7	7	West Virginia	9	13	.409	8.5	27	27	.500
8	8	Baylor	9	15	.375	9.5	23	32	.418
9	–	Kansas	8	15	.348	10	23	32	.418

== Results ==
First round
1	TCU	5
8	Baylor	6
4	Texas Tech	1
5	Texas	2
1	TCU	1
4	Texas Tech	8
3	Oklahoma	3
6	Kansas State	7
2	Oklahoma State	3
7	West Virginia	0
3	Oklahoma	6
7	West Virginia	1

Second round
8	Baylor	3
5	Texas	4
4	Texas Tech	4
8	Baylor	5
6	Kansas State	1
2	Oklahoma State	10
3	Oklahoma	3
6	Kansas State	1

Semifinals
5	Texas	4	–
8	Baylor	0	–
2	Oklahoma State	5	–
3	Oklahoma	1	–

Final
5	Texas	6
2	Oklahoma State	3

== All-Tournament Team ==
Position	Player	School
C	Tres Barrera	Texas
1B	Dustin Williams	Oklahoma State
2B	Brooks Marlow	Texas
SS	Donnie Walton	Oklahoma State
3B	Bret Boswell	Texas
OF	Kameron Esthay	Baylor
OF	Taylor Alspaugh	Oklahoma
OF	Zane Gurwitz	Texas
DH	Joe Baker	Texas
SP	Michael Freeman	Oklahoma State
SP	Parker French	Texas
SP	Connor Mayes	Texas
RP	Trey Cobb	Oklahoma State
MOP	Zane Gurwitz	Texas
