= Tointon Family Stadium =

Baseball stadium in Manhattan, Kansas

Coordinates: 39°11′57″N 96°35′49″W

Frank Myers Field at Tointon Family Stadium
- Interactive map of Frank Myers Field at Tointon Family Stadium
- Former names: KSU Baseball Stadium (1961–2002)
- Location: 1800 College Ave. Manhattan, KS 66502
- Owner: Kansas State University
- Operator: Kansas State University
- Capacity: 2,331
- Surface: AstroTurf GameDay Grass 3D
- Field size: Left Field – 340 ft Left-Center – 375 ft Center Field – 400 ft Right-Center – 375 ft Right Field – 325 ft

Construction
- Opened: April 7, 1961

Tenant
- Kansas State Wildcats (1961–present)

Frank Myers Field at Tointon Family Stadium is a baseball stadium in Manhattan, Kansas. It is the home field of the Kansas State University Wildcats college baseball team. The stadium's official capacity is 2,331 and opened for baseball in 1961. It is named after Bob and Betty Tointon, the principle benefactors for 2002 renovation project.

== Construction ==
Tointon Family Stadium opened as KSU Baseball Stadium in 1961, with a capacity of 1,500. It would be built around the existing diamond, now called Frank Myers Field.

After the stadium's completion the field was dedicated on April 7, 1961, in honor of Frank Myers, K-State's baseball coach who retired the following year. It would be another 24 years until the team could play night games after lights were installed in 1985.

== Renovations ==
In 2002, on its 41st anniversary, KSU Stadium saw the completion of its first significant renovation. The $3.1 million project ended with the dedication on April 20, 2002, named in honor of Betty and Bob Tointon (Class of 1955).

New features included:

- State-of-the-art drainage and irrigation systems
- New home and visiting dugouts
- New seating for over 2,000 fans with 118 in the suites
- FieldTurf on the entire infield
- 3,150 square feet (293 m^{2}) locker room
  - 33 custom-built wood lockers
  - Bathrooms
  - Shower Facilities
  - Team Common Room
  - New administration offices and facilities
- During the summer of 2011, the entire playing surface was upgraded to AstroTurf GameDay Grass 3D.

The stadium is lined with the limestone donated by the Bayer Stone Company of St. Marys to match main campus buildings, including Anderson Hall. In 2003 a state-of-the-art lighting system, electronic scoreboard, improved warning track and permanent ticket booth were added, followed two years later by new batting cages.

In 2020, Tointon Family Stadium completed a $15 million 2-year refurbishment to the facility in conjunction with the neighboring Busser Family Park, home for K-State Women's Soccer. This project brought improvements to the playing field and bullpens, expanded premium seating options on the club level, and upgrades to the clubhouse, new offices, and various other improvements. Expanded fan amenities were installed during the project including a permanent team merchandise store, a playground for young fans and families, and a new 44'x36' videoboard was installed beyond right field and is the first in the stadium's history. The exterior of the facility received a face lift with a new limestone façade to match the theme of other Athletic and Campus facilities. Improvements were also made to the Brandeberry Indoor Practice Facility, one of the few indoor baseball practice facilities in the nation which includes two batting cages, portable pitching mounds, and weight training and conditioning equipment.

== Attendance ==
In 2013, the Wildcats ranked 46th among Division I baseball programs in attendance, averaging 1,369 per home game.

== Historical notes ==
- The current 8-pole lighting system produces three times the illumination as the former system.
- The facility used a manually operated scoreboard until the renovations in 2002, now using a 20-foot-tall (6.1 m) by 36-foot-wide (11 m) Daktronics scoreboard.

== See also ==
- List of NCAA Division I baseball venues
