= Hoglund Ballpark =

Baseball stadium in Lawrence, Kansas, US

Coordinates: 38.952955°N 95.252938°W

- The Hog
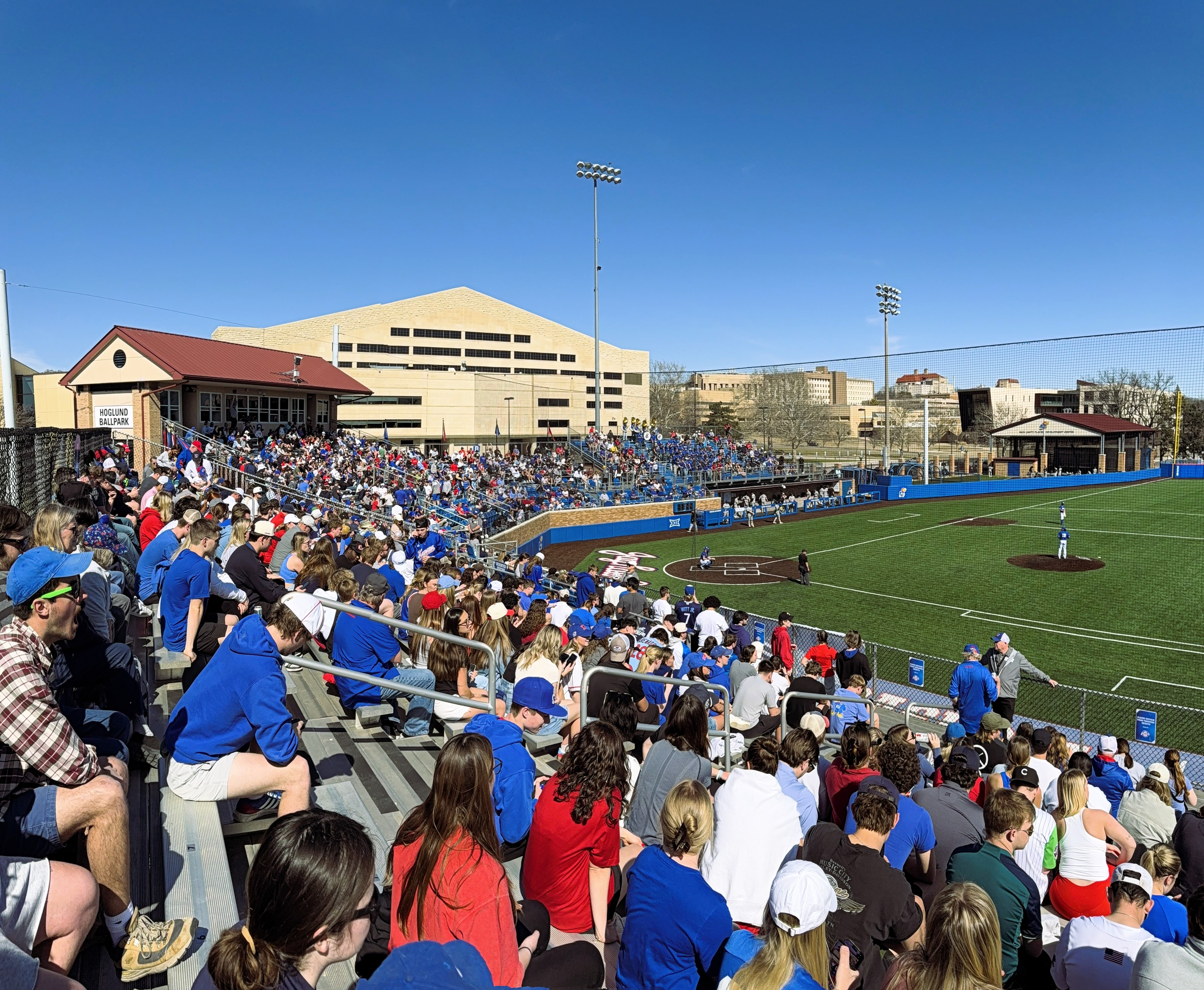
- The park in 2025
- Interactive map of Hoglund Ballpark
- Full name: Hoglund Ballpark
- Former names: Quigley Field (1958–1999)
- Location: Lawrence, Kansas
- Owner: University of Kansas
- Operator: University of Kansas
- Capacity: 2,500
- Surface: Shaw Sports Turf
- Field size: Left Field - 330'; Center Field - 400'; Right Field - 330'

Construction
- Opened: 1958; 68 years ago
- Renovated: 1987, 2010, 2024

Tenant
- Kansas Jayhawks (NCAA) (1958–Present)

Website
- kuathletics.com/hoglund-ballpark

Hoglund Ballpark is a baseball stadium in Lawrence, Kansas. It is the home field for the University of Kansas' baseball team. The stadium holds 3,000 people and opened for baseball in 1958. The stadium sits next to historic Allen Fieldhouse, home to the Kansas Jayhawks basketball teams. It is named after former Jayhawk baseball shortstop and former petroleum-industry CEO Forrest Hoglund.

Following the 2010 season, an artificial turf surface was installed at the facility. The installation, which was overseen by AstroTurf USA at a cost of $1.2 million, all of which was funded by donations to the Jayhawk baseball program.

A new Shaw Sports Turf field was installed in 2025 in time for the season's home opener. A new, larger video board and audio system was installed on the south end of the stadium. Upgrades to the student section were completed in January 2025. A banner that reads "Pay Heed All Who Enter, Beware of the Hog" was hung in front of the student section, a play on Kansas basketball's "Pay Heed All Who Enter, Beware of the Phog" banner in historic Allen Fieldhouse, which is only 150 feet away from Hoglund Ballpark to the north.

== See also ==
- List of NCAA Division I baseball venues
