= Allie P. Reynolds Stadium =

Former baseball park at Oklahoma State University

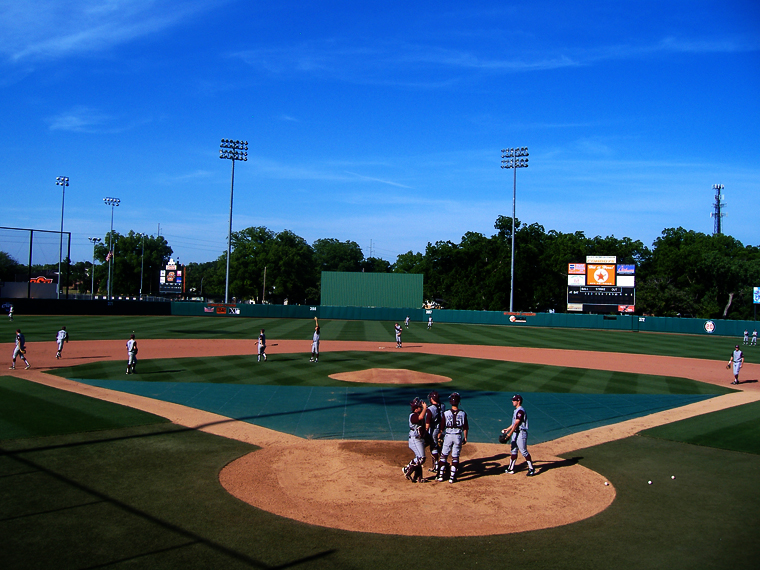

- Location within Oklahoma Location within the United States
- Interactive map of Allie P. Reynolds Stadium
- Location: Stillwater, Oklahoma
- Coordinates: 36.1285°N 97.0641°W
- Owner: Oklahoma State University
- Operator: Oklahoma State University
- Capacity: 3,821
- Surface: Grass
- Field size: Left field: 330 ft (100 m); Left center: 390 ft (120 m); Center field: 400 ft (120 m); Right center: 385 ft (117 m); Right field: 330 ft (100 m)

Construction
- Opened: April 4, 1981
- Closed: March 11, 2020 (apparent); March 15, 2020 (planned)
- Cost: $2.2 million

Tenant
- Oklahoma State (Big 12) 1981–2020

Website
- Allie P. Reynolds Stadium website

Allie P. Reynolds Stadium is a former baseball park in Stillwater, Oklahoma. The home field of the Oklahoma State University Cowboys college baseball team, it was named after former OSU and New York Yankees baseball great Allie Reynolds.

== History ==
Allie P. Reynolds Stadium has a listed capacity of 3,281 people and was opened April 4, 1981, against then-Big 8 foe Missouri. The stadium was officially dedicated on April 24, 1982, in a ceremony attended by Allie Reynolds and Yankee legends, Bill Dickey and Mickey Mantle, and Braves legend, Warren Spahn.

In addition to the dominating Cowboy baseball teams of the 1980s, the ballpark has hosted nine NCAA Regional tournaments in its history. The stadium's $200,000 lighting system, installed in 1981, was instrumental in attracting the Regionals to Stillwater. Major renovations, funded primarily by the private contributions to the Reynolds Stadium Development Fund, through the years have helped keep the stadium up-to-date. The biggest changes to the stadium have been the expanded seating, new perimeter fences, and new dressing rooms in 1993. A new clubhouse was built in June 2005 along the third base dugout. The 6,200-square-foot (580 m^{2}) facility cost approximately $700,000 and includes a modern locker room, lounge, and media equipment.

Other renovations to Reynolds Stadium include a re-landscaping of the playing surface in 1992, a new scoreboard in 1995, a padded fence in 1997, a new indoor hitting facility in 2001, a new sound system in 2002, and another new scoreboard in 2004. Major upgrades to the bullpen areas, warning tracks, and playing surface were made in the fall of 2005.

Allie P. Reynolds will be replaced by the new O'Brate Stadium, aimed at attracting Super Regional round games. The new ballpark has a permanent capacity of 3,500, slightly smaller than that of Reynolds, but is expandable to 8,000 for major events such as NCAA tournament games.

The Cowboys had planned to play their first 14 home games of the 2020 season at Reynolds, ending on March 15 with the last of a three-game series against Fresno State. O'Brate Stadium was then to open on March 20 for the Cowboys' 2020 Big 12 opener against TCU with former president George W. Bush scheduled to throw out the first pitch.

However, on March 13, the baseball season ended when the Big 12 announced that all spring sports were canceled due to the COVID-19 pandemic, both postponing the O'Brate opening and apparently closing Reynolds early. The apparent last game was played on March 11 against Saint Louis, a 7–1 Cowboy victory.

== Year-By-Year home record ==
- 1981—11-6
- 1982—30-3
- 1983—33-6
- 1984—39-4
- 1985—27-5
- 1986—35-2
- 1987—33-4
- 1988—36-3
- 1989—24-7
- 1990—26-4
- 1991—22-7
- 1992—25-4
- 1993—21-5
- 1994—28-5
- 1995—17-6
- 1996—23-3
- 1997—25-4
- 1998—25-6
- 1999—21-3
- 2000—26-6
- 2001—22-6
- 2002—24-9
- 2003—19-6
- 2004—19-9
- 2005—25-8
- 2006—28-4
- 2007—
- 2008— 18-9
- 2009— 25-13
- 2010— 24-11
- 2011— 25-7
- 2012— 24-7
- 2013— 24-7
- 2014— 25-10
- 2015— 22-9
- 2016— 19-7
- 2017— 16-14
- 2018— 12-10-1
- 2019— 19-7

== Trivia ==
- First Game – April 4, 1981 (Missouri 8, OSU 6)
- Dedicated – April 24, 1982
- First Win – April 5, 1981 (OSU 7, Missouri 4)
- Last Game – apparent, March 11, 2020 (OSU 7, Saint Louis 1); planned, March 15, 2020 against Fresno State
- Longest Winning Streak – 54 games (1986 & 1987)
- Longest Losing Streak – 6 games (2007)
- Largest Average Attendance – 3,492 (1985)
- Longest Game – 18 innings, 6 hours 51 minutes (April 3, 2015)

== See also ==
- List of NCAA Division I baseball venues
