= 2015 Boston College Eagles baseball team =

American college baseball season

2015 Boston College Eagles baseball
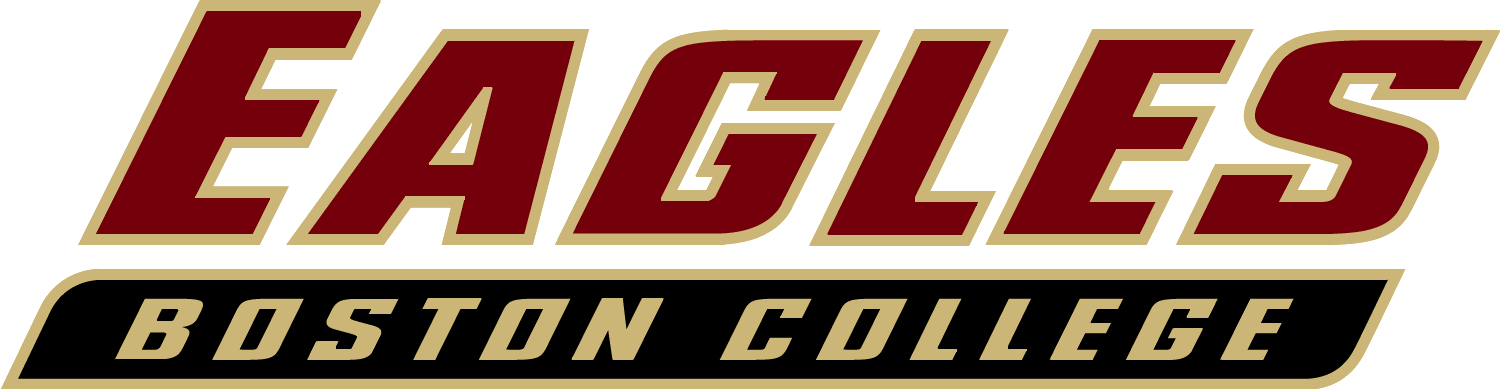
- Conference: Atlantic Coast Conference
- Record: 27–27 (10–19 ACC)
- Head coach: Mike Gambino (5th season)
- Assistant coaches: Jim Foster (1st season); Greg Sullivan (5th season)
- Home stadium: Eddie Pellagrini Diamond at John Shea Field

2015 Atlantic Coast Conference baseball standings
| | Conf. | | | | Overall |
| Team | W | | L | PCT | W | | L | PCT |
|---|---|---|---|---|---|---|---|---|
Atlantic
| No. 10 Louisville ^{x}‍‍‍^{y} | 25 | – | 5 | .833 | 47 | – | 18 | .723 |
| No. 26 Notre Dame ‍‍‍^{y} | 17 | – | 13 | .567 | 37 | – | 23 | .617 |
| No. 12 Florida State ‍‍‡‍^{y} | 17 | – | 13 | .567 | 44 | – | 21 | .677 |
| Clemson ‍‍‍^{y} | 16 | – | 13 | .552 | 32 | – | 29 | .525 |
| NC State ‍‍‍^{y} | 15 | – | 14 | .517 | 36 | – | 23 | .610 |
| Wake Forest ‍‍‍ | 12 | – | 18 | .400 | 27 | – | 26 | .509 |
| Boston College ‍‍‍ | 10 | – | 19 | .345 | 27 | – | 27 | .500 |
Coastal
| No. 6 Miami (FL) ^{x}‍‍‍^{y} | 22 | – | 8 | .733 | 50 | – | 16 | .758 |
| No. 1 Virginia ‍‍‍^{y} | 15 | – | 15 | .500 | 44 | – | 24 | .647 |
| North Carolina ‍‍‍ | 13 | – | 16 | .448 | 34 | – | 24 | .586 |
| Virginia Tech ‍‍‍ | 13 | – | 16 | .448 | 27 | – | 27 | .500 |
| Georgia Tech ‍‍‍ | 13 | – | 17 | .433 | 32 | – | 23 | .582 |
| Duke ‍‍‍ | 10 | – | 19 | .345 | 31 | – | 22 | .585 |
| Pittsburgh ‍‍‍ | 9 | – | 21 | .300 | 20 | – | 32 | .385 |
x – Division champion ‡ – Tournament champion y – Invited to the NCAA tournament As of June 30, 2015; Rankings from Collegiate Baseball

The 2015 Boston College Eagles baseball team represented Boston College during the 2015 NCAA Division I baseball season. The Eagles played their home games at Eddie Pellagrini Diamond at John Shea Field as a member of the Atlantic Coast Conference. They were led by head coach Mike Gambino, in his fifth year at Boston College.

== Previous season ==
In 2014, the Eagles finished the season 6th in the ACC's Atlantic Division with a record of 22–33, 10–20 in conference play. They failed to qualify for the 2014 Atlantic Coast Conference baseball tournament or the 2014 NCAA Division I baseball tournament.

== Personnel ==
=== Roster ===
2015 Boston College Eagles roster
| Pitchers: 10 – Michael Strem – Sophomore; 12 – John Gorman – Senior; 14 – Jeff Burke – Junior; 16 – John Nicklas – Junior; 17 – Jesse Adams – Junior; 18 – Luke Fernandes – (redshirt) Sophomore; 19 – Justin Dunn – Sophomore; 20 – Kyle Dunster – Freshman; 21 – Eric Stone – Senior; 22 – Tyler Hinchliffe – (redshirt) Junior; 26 – Bobby Skogsbergh – Sophomore; 27 – Brian Rapp – Freshman; 28 – Mitch Bigras – Freshman; 29 – Nick Poore – Senior; 30 – Donovan Casey – Freshman; 32 – Kevin Connor – (redshirt) Freshman; 34 – Mike King – Sophomore; 37 – Carmen Giampetruzzi – Freshman; 40 – James Walsh – Freshman | Catchers: 7 – Nick Sciortino – Sophomore; 9 – Stephen Sauter – Junior; Infielders: 3 – Blake Butera – Senior; 4 – Joe Cronin – Junior; 11 – Jake Palomaki – Freshman; 15 – Anthony Maselli – Freshman; 25 – Johnny Adams – Sophomore; 44 – Trevor Massey – Freshman | Outfielders: 2 – Nick Colucci – (redshirt) Junior; 24 – Chris Shaw – Junior; 36 – Scott Baren – Freshman |

=== Coaching staff ===
| Name | Position | Seasons at Boston College | Alma mater |
|---|---|---|---|
| Mike Gambino | Head coach | 5 | Boston College (1999) |
| Jim Foster | Associate head coach | 1 | Providence College (1993) |
| Greg Sullivan | Assistant coach | 5 | Eastern Connecticut State University (2006) |

== Schedule ==
Legend
| | Boston College win |
| | Boston College loss |
| | Postponement |
| **Bold** | Boston College team member |

2015 Boston College baseball game log
Regular Season
February

| # | Date | Opponent | Rank | Site/stadium | Score | Win | Loss | Save | Attendance | Overall record | ACC Record |
|---|---|---|---|---|---|---|---|---|---|---|---|
| 1 | February 13 | vs. Wofford | | Harley Park • Spartanburg, SC | **L** 8–4 | Milburn (1–0) | Skogsbergh (0–1) | Stillman (1) | 367 | 0–1 | 0–0 |
| 2 | February 14 | vs. Xavier | | Harley Park • Spartanburg, SC | | | | | | | |
| 3 | February 14 | at USC Upstate | | Harley Park • Spartanburg, SC | | | | | | | |
| 4 | February 15 | vs. Xavier | | Harley Park • Spartanburg, SC | | | | | | | |
| 5 | February 20 | at LSU | | Alex Box Stadium • Baton Rouge, LA | | | | | | | |
| 6 | February 21 | at LSU | | Alex Box Stadium • Baton Rouge, LA | | | | | | | |
| 7 | February 22 | at LSU | | Alex Box Stadium • Baton Rouge, LA | | | | | | | |
| 8 | February 27 | vs. Omaha | | North Charlotte Regional Park • Port Charlotte, FL | | | | | | | |
| 9 | February 28 | vs. North Dakota State | | North Charlotte Regional Park • Port Charlotte, FL | | | | | | | |

March

| # | Date | Opponent | Rank | Site/stadium | Score | Win | Loss | Save | Attendance | Overall record | ACC Record |
|---|---|---|---|---|---|---|---|---|---|---|---|
| 10 | March 1 | vs. Kansas | | North Charlotte Regional Park • Port Charlotte, FL | | | | | | | |
| 11 | March 2 | vs. Villanova | | North Charlotte Regional Park • Port Charlotte, FL | | | | | | | |
| 12 | March 6 | at Florida State | | Dick Howser Stadium • Tallahassee, FL | | | | | | | |
| 13 | March 7 | at Florida State | | Dick Howser Stadium • Tallahassee, FL | | | | | | | |
| 14 | March 8 | at Florida State | | Dick Howser Stadium • Tallahassee, FL | | | | | | | |
| 15 | March 13 | at Louisville | | Jim Patterson Stadium • Louisville, KY | | | | | | | |
| 16 | March 14 | at Louisville | | Jim Patterson Stadium • Louisville, KY | | | | | | | |
| 17 | March 15 | at Louisville | | Jim Patterson Stadium • Louisville, KY | | | | | | | |
| 18 | March 17 | at Holy Cross | | Fitton Field • Worcester, MA | | | | | | | |
| 19 | March 18 | Bryant | | Pellagrini Diamond • Chestnut Hill, MA | | | | | | | |
| 20 | March 20 | NC State | | Pellagrini Diamond • Chestnut Hill, MA | | | | | | | |
| 21 | March 21 | NC State | | Pellagrini Diamond • Chestnut Hill, MA | | | | | | | |
| 22 | March 22 | NC State | | Pellagrini Diamond • Chestnut Hill, MA | | | | | | | |
| 23 | March 24 | at Northeastern | | Parsons Field • Brookline, MA | | | | | | | |
| 24 | March 27 | Duke | | Pellagrini Diamond • Chestnut Hill, MA | | | | | | | |
| 25 | March 28 | Duke | | Pellagrini Diamond • Chestnut Hill, MA | | | | | | | |
| 26 | March 29 | Duke | | Pellagrini Diamond • Chestnut Hill, MA | | | | | | | |
| 27 | March 31 | at Connecticut | | J. O. Christian Field • Storrs, CT | | | | | | | |

April

| # | Date | Opponent | Rank | Site/stadium | Score | Win | Loss | Save | Attendance | Overall record | ACC Record |
|---|---|---|---|---|---|---|---|---|---|---|---|
| 28 | April 1 | UMass | | Pellagrini Diamond • Chestnut Hill, MA | | | | | | | |
| 29 | April 3 | at Wake Forest | | Wake Forest Baseball Park • Winston-Salem, NC | | | | | | | |
| 30 | April 4 | at Wake Forest | | Wake Forest Baseball Park • Winston-Salem, NC | | | | | | | |
| 31 | April 5 | at Wake Forest | | Wake Forest Baseball Park • Winston-Salem, NC | | | | | | | |
| 32 | April 7 | at Dartmouth | | Biondi Park • Hanover, NH | | | | | | | |
| 33 | April 8 | Northeastern | | Pellagrini Diamond • Chestnut Hill, MA | | | | | | | |
| 34 | April 10 | Clemson | | Pellagrini Diamond • Chestnut Hill, MA | | | | | | | |
| 35 | April 11 | Clemson | | Pellagrini Diamond • Chestnut Hill, MA | | | | | | | |
| 36 | April 12 | Clemson | | Pellagrini Diamond • Chestnut Hill, MA | | | | | | | |
| 37 | April 14 | Rhode Island | | Pellagrini Diamond • Chestnut Hill, MA | | | | | | | |
| 38 | April 15 | Harvard | | Pellagrini Diamond • Chestnut Hill, MA | | | | | | | |
| 39 | April 17 | Georgia Tech | | Pellagrini Diamond • Chestnut Hill, MA | | | | | | | |
| 40 | April 18 | Georgia Tech | | Pellagrini Diamond • Chestnut Hill, MA | | | | | | | |
| 41 | April 19 | Georgia Tech | | Pellagrini Diamond • Chestnut Hill, MA | | | | | | | |
| 42 | April 22 | TBD | | Fenway Park • Boston, MA | | | | | | | |
| 43 | April 24 | at North Carolina | | Boshamer Stadium • Chapel Hill, NC | | | | | | | |
| 44 | April 25 | at North Carolina | | Boshamer Stadium • Chapel Hill, NC | | | | | | | |
| 45 | April 26 | at North Carolina | | Boshamer Stadium • Chapel Hill, NC | | | | | | | |
| 46 | April 28 | at Rhode Island | | Bill Beck Field • Kingston, RI | | | | | | | |

May

| # | Date | Opponent | Rank | Site/stadium | Score | Win | Loss | Save | Attendance | Overall record | ACC Record |
|---|---|---|---|---|---|---|---|---|---|---|---|
| 47 | May 1 | at Virginia Tech | | English Field • Blacksburg, VA | | | | | | | |
| 48 | May 2 | at Virginia Tech | | English Field • Blacksburg, VA | | | | | | | |
| 49 | May 3 | at Virginia Tech | | English Field • Blacksburg, VA | | | | | | | |
| 50 | May 9 | Hartford | | Pellagrini Diamond • Chestnut Hill, MA | | | | | | | |
| 51 | May 10 | Hartford | | Pellagrini Diamond • Chestnut Hill, MA | | | | | | | |
| 52 | May 12 | Maine | | Pellagrini Diamond • Chestnut Hill, MA | | | | | | | |
| 53 | May 14 | Notre Dame | | Pellagrini Diamond • Chestnut Hill, MA | | | | | | | |
| 54 | May 15 | Notre Dame | | Pellagrini Diamond • Chestnut Hill, MA | | | | | | | |
| 55 | May 16 | Notre Dame | | Pellagrini Diamond • Chestnut Hill, MA | | | | | | | |

All rankings from Collegiate Baseball.

== Awards and honors ==
Chris Shaw

- Louisville Slugger Pre-season Second Team All-American
- Perfect Game USA Pre-season First team All-American
- Baseball America Pre-season Second team All-American
