= 2015 Pittsburgh Panthers baseball team =

American college baseball season

2015 Pittsburgh Panthers baseball
- Conference: Atlantic Coast Conference
- Record: 20–32 (9–21 ACC)
- Head coach: Joe Jordano (18th season)
- Assistant coaches: Jerry Oakes (3rd season); Bryan Peters (2nd season); Shane Liska (2nd season)
- Home stadium: Charles L. Cost Field

2015 Atlantic Coast Conference baseball standings
	Conf.				Overall
Team	W		L	PCT	W		L	PCT
Atlantic
No. 10 Louisville ^{x}‍‍‍^{y}	25	–	5	.833	47	–	18	.723
No. 26 Notre Dame ‍‍‍^{y}	17	–	13	.567	37	–	23	.617
No. 12 Florida State ‍‍‡‍^{y}	17	–	13	.567	44	–	21	.677
Clemson ‍‍‍^{y}	16	–	13	.552	32	–	29	.525
NC State ‍‍‍^{y}	15	–	14	.517	36	–	23	.610
Wake Forest ‍‍‍	12	–	18	.400	27	–	26	.509
Boston College ‍‍‍	10	–	19	.345	27	–	27	.500
Coastal
No. 6 Miami (FL) ^{x}‍‍‍^{y}	22	–	8	.733	50	–	16	.758
No. 1 Virginia ‍‍‍^{y}	15	–	15	.500	44	–	24	.647
North Carolina ‍‍‍	13	–	16	.448	34	–	24	.586
Virginia Tech ‍‍‍	13	–	16	.448	27	–	27	.500
Georgia Tech ‍‍‍	13	–	17	.433	32	–	23	.582
Duke ‍‍‍	10	–	19	.345	31	–	22	.585
Pittsburgh ‍‍‍	9	–	21	.300	20	–	32	.385
x – Division champion ‡ – Tournament champion y – Invited to the NCAA tournament As of June 30, 2015; Rankings from Collegiate Baseball

The 2015 Pittsburgh Panthers baseball team represented the University of Pittsburgh during the 2015 NCAA Division I baseball season. The Panthers played their home games at Charles L. Cost Field as a member of the Atlantic Coast Conference. They were led by head coach Joe Jordano, in his 18th season at Pittsburgh.

== Previous season ==
In 2014, the Panthers finished the season 6th in the ACC's Coastal Division with a record of 22–30, 11–19 in conference play. They failed to qualify for the 2014 Atlantic Coast Conference baseball tournament or the 2014 NCAA Division I baseball tournament.

== Personnel ==
=== Roster ===
2015 Pittsburgh Panthers roster
Pitchers: 4 – Dan Furman – (redshirt) Freshman; 9 – Matthew Renck – Freshman; 12 – Hobie Harris – Senior; 19 – Sam Mersing – Sophomore; 20 – Aaron Schnurbusch – Junior; 21 – Sam Proctor – Freshman; 22 – Nick Parnell – Senior; 27 – Marc Berube – Junior; 29 – Garrett Wrambel – Junior; 31 – Isaac Mattson – Freshman; 34 – T. J. Zeuch – Sophomore; 35 – Aaron Sandefur – Junior; 37 – Rich Condeelis – Junior; 40 – Josh Mitchell – (redshirt) Freshman; 41 – Matt Pidich – Sophomore; 45 – Ryan Campbell – Freshman; 47 – Joseph Cominsky – Freshman	Catchers: 6 – Caleb Parry – Sophomore; 15 – Alex Kowalczyk – Junior; 26 – Ben Snyder – Freshman; 43 – Manny Pazos – Sophomore; 44 – Matt Emge – (redshirt) Sophomore; Infielders: 5 – Matt Johnson – Senior; 7 – Joe McHugh – Freshman; 8 – Eric Hess – Senior; 14 – Charles LeBlanc – Freshman; 16 – Jordan Frabasilio – Senior; 18 – Ron Sherman – Junior; 42 – P. J. DeMeo – Sophomore	Outfielders: 3 – Frank Maldonado – (redshirt) Freshman; 11 – Jawan McAllister – Freshman; 13 – Jacob Wright – (redshirt) Sophomore; 24 – Boo Vazquez – Senior; 33 – Nick Yarnall – Sophomore

=== Coaching staff ===
Name	Position	Seasons at Pittsburgh	Alma mater
Joe Jordano	Head coach	18	Westminster College (1985)
Jerry Oakes	Assistant head coach	3	Coastal Carolina University (2012)
Bryan Peters	Assistant coach	2	University of South Florida (1997)
Shane Liska	Assistant coach	2	Xavier University (2011)

== Season ==
=== February ===
The Panthers opened up their season with three games in Port Charlotte, Florida, as part of the annual Snowbird Baseball Classic. In their first game of the three game tournament, Pittsburgh defeated Saint Louis Billikens baseball, 18–1. The Billikens were the three-time defending Atlantic 10 Conference regular season champions. Frank Maldonado hit his first career home run in his first career game and T. J. Zeuch struck out nine Billikens in the victory.

== Schedule ==
Legend
	Pittsburgh win
	Pittsburgh loss
	Postponement
**Bold**	Pittsburgh team member

2015 Pittsburgh Panthers baseball game log
Regular season
February

Date	Opponent	Rank	Site/stadium	Score	Win	Loss	Save	Attendance	Overall record	ACC Record
February 13	vs. Saint Louis		Charlotte Sports Park • Port Charlotte, FL	18–1	**Zuech** (1–0)	Moore (0–1)			1–0	–
February 14	vs. Kansas State		North Charlotte Regional Park • Port Charlotte, FL							
February 15	vs. Ohio State		North Charlotte Regional Park • Port Charlotte, FL							
February 20	at Wofford		Russell C. King Field • Spartanburg, SC							
February 21	at USC Upstate		Harley Park • Spartanburg, SC							
February 22	vs. East Tennessee State		Harley Park • Spartanburg, SC							
February 27	at VCU		The Diamond • Richmond, VA							
February 28	at VCU		The Diamond • Richmond, VA							

March

Date	Opponent	Rank	Site/stadium	Score	Win	Loss	Save	Attendance	Overall record	ACC Record
March 1	at VCU		The Diamond • Richmond, VA							
March 6	at Virginia		Davenport Field • Charlottesville, VA							
March 7	at Virginia		Davenport Field • Charlottesville, VA							
March 8	at Virginia		Davenport Field • Charlottesville, VA							
March 10	Niagara		Charles L. Cost Field • Pittsburgh, PA							
March 10	Niagara		Charles L. Cost Field • Pittsburgh, PA							
March 11	Niagara		Charles L. Cost Field • Pittsburgh, PA							
March 13	North Carolina		Charles L. Cost Field • Pittsburgh, PA							
March 14	North Carolina		Charles L. Cost Field • Pittsburgh, PA							
March 15	North Carolina		Charles L. Cost Field • Pittsburgh, PA							
March 17	Penn State		Charles L. Cost Field • Pittsburgh, PA							
March 18	Akron		Charles L. Cost Field • Pittsburgh, PA							
March 20	at Duke		Durham Bulls Athletic Park • Durham, NC							
March 21	at Duke		Durham Bulls Athletic Park • Durham, NC							
March 22	at Duke		Durham Bulls Athletic Park • Durham, NC							
March 25	at Youngstown State		Eastwood Field • Niles, OH							
March 27	at NC State		Doak Field • Raleigh, NC							
March 28	at NC State		Doak Field • Raleigh, NC							
March 29	at NC State		Doak Field • Raleigh, NC							
March 31	West Virginia		Charles L. Cost Field • Pittsburgh, PA							

April

Date	Opponent	Rank	Site/stadium	Score	Win	Loss	Save	Attendance	Overall record	ACC Record
April 3	Notre Dame		Charles L. Cost Field • Pittsburgh, PA							
April 4	Notre Dame		Charles L. Cost Field • Pittsburgh, PA							
April 5	Notre Dame		Charles L. Cost Field • Pittsburgh, PA							
April 7	at Akron		Lee R. Jackson Baseball Field • Akron, OH							
April 8	Youngstown State		Charles L. Cost Field • Pittsburgh, PA							
April 10	Wake Forest		Charles L. Cost Field • Pittsburgh, PA							
April 11	Wake Forest		Charles L. Cost Field • Pittsburgh, PA							
April 12	Wake Forest		Charles L. Cost Field • Pittsburgh, PA							
April 14	Kent State		Charles L. Cost Field • Pittsburgh, PA							
April 17	at Florida State		Dick Howser Stadium • Tallahassee, FL							
April 18	at Florida State		Dick Howser Stadium • Tallahassee, FL							
April 19	at Florida State		Dick Howser Stadium • Tallahassee, FL							
April 25	Fairfield		Charles L. Cost Field • Pittsburgh, PA							
April 25	Fairfield		Charles L. Cost Field • Pittsburgh, PA							
April 26	Fairfield		Charles L. Cost Field • Pittsburgh, PA							
April 29	at Penn State		Medlar Field • University Park, PA							

May

Date	Opponent	Rank	Site/stadium	Score	Win	Loss	Save	Attendance	Overall record	ACC Record
May 2	Miami (FL)		Charles L. Cost Field • Pittsburgh, PA							
May 2	Miami (FL)		Charles L. Cost Field • Pittsburgh, PA							
May 3	Miami (FL)		Charles L. Cost Field • Pittsburgh, PA							
May 8	at Georgia Tech		Russ Chandler Stadium • Atlanta, GA							
May 9	at Georgia Tech		Russ Chandler Stadium • Atlanta, GA							
May 10	at Georgia Tech		Russ Chandler Stadium • Atlanta, GA							
May 12	at West Virginia		Monongalia County Ballpark • Granville, WV							
May 15	Virginia Tech		Charles L. Cost Field • Pittsburgh, PA							
May 16	Virginia Tech		Charles L. Cost Field • Pittsburgh, PA							
May 17	Virginia Tech		Charles L. Cost Field • Pittsburgh, PA							

Postseason
ACC Tournament

Date	Opponent	Rank	Site/stadium	Score	Win	Loss	Save	Attendance	Overall record	ACCT Record
May 19	TBD		Durham Bulls Athletic Park • Durham, NC							

All rankings from Collegiate Baseball.
