= 2015 Georgia Tech Yellow Jackets baseball team =

American college baseball season

2015 Georgia Tech Yellow Jackets baseball
- Conference: Atlantic Coast Conference
- Record: 32-23 (13-18 ACC)
- Head coach: Danny Hall (22nd season)
- Assistant coaches: Jason Howell (3rd season); Bryan Prince (8th season)
- Home stadium: Russ Chandler Stadium

2015 Atlantic Coast Conference baseball standings
	Conf.				Overall
Team	W		L	PCT	W		L	PCT
Atlantic
No. 10 Louisville ^{x}‍‍‍^{y}	25	–	5	.833	47	–	18	.723
No. 26 Notre Dame ‍‍‍^{y}	17	–	13	.567	37	–	23	.617
No. 12 Florida State ‍‍‡‍^{y}	17	–	13	.567	44	–	21	.677
Clemson ‍‍‍^{y}	16	–	13	.552	32	–	29	.525
NC State ‍‍‍^{y}	15	–	14	.517	36	–	23	.610
Wake Forest ‍‍‍	12	–	18	.400	27	–	26	.509
Boston College ‍‍‍	10	–	19	.345	27	–	27	.500
Coastal
No. 6 Miami (FL) ^{x}‍‍‍^{y}	22	–	8	.733	50	–	16	.758
No. 1 Virginia ‍‍‍^{y}	15	–	15	.500	44	–	24	.647
North Carolina ‍‍‍	13	–	16	.448	34	–	24	.586
Virginia Tech ‍‍‍	13	–	16	.448	27	–	27	.500
Georgia Tech ‍‍‍	13	–	17	.433	32	–	23	.582
Duke ‍‍‍	10	–	19	.345	31	–	22	.585
Pittsburgh ‍‍‍	9	–	21	.300	20	–	32	.385
x – Division champion ‡ – Tournament champion y – Invited to the NCAA tournament As of June 30, 2015; Rankings from Collegiate Baseball

The 2015 Georgia Tech Yellow Jackets baseball team represented Georgia Institute of Technology during the 2015 NCAA Division I baseball season. The Yellow Jackets played their home games at Russ Chandler Stadium as a member of the Atlantic Coast Conference. They were led by head coach Danny Hall, in his 22nd season at Georgia Tech.

== Previous season ==
In 2014, the Yellow Jackets finished the season 5th in the ACC's Coastal Division with a record of 37–27, 14–16 in conference play. They qualified for the 2014 Atlantic Coast Conference baseball tournament, and, after going 2–1 in pool play, defeated Maryland in the championship game to win their 9th conference tournament championship as a member of the ACC. They qualified for the 2014 NCAA Division I baseball tournament as the automatic bid from the ACC, marking their 7th straight tournament appearance. They were placed in the Oxford Regional, along with Ole Miss, Washington, and Jacksonville State. The Yellow Jackets fell to the Huskies 0–8, but rebounded in their second game to defeat Jacksonville State, 4–2, in the loser's bracket. However, in their third game, a rematch with Washington, the Yellow Jackets were eliminated, losing 2–4.

== Personnel ==
=== Roster ===
2015 Georgia Tech Yellow Jackets roster
Pitchers: 4 - Zac Ryan - Sophomore; 8 - Ryan Young - Freshman; 20 - Matt Phillips - Sophomore; 23 - Ben Parr - Sophomore; 24 - Joe Wiseman - Junior; 26 - Matthew Gorst - Sophomore; 27 - Patrick Wiseman - Freshman; 28 - Jared Datoc - Freshman; 29 - Cory Pope - Freshman; 30 - Ben Schneiderjans - Sophomore; 31 - Tanner Shelton - Sophomore; 32 - Cody Worthy - Freshman; 36 - Cole Pitts - (redshirt) Junior; 37 - Daniel Gooden - Freshman; 39 - Jonathan King - (redshirt) Sophomore; 41 - Devin Stanton - (redshirt) Senior; 42 - Kyle Leach - Junior	Catchers: 2 - Grant Wruble - Junior; 7 - Arden Pabst - Sophomore; 22 - Trevor Craport - Freshman; Infielders: 3 - Wade Bailey - Freshman; 9 - A.J. Murray - Senior; 10 - Brandon Gold - Sophomore; 11 - Blake Jackson - Freshman; 13 - Thomas Smith - Senior; 14 - Matt Gonzalez - Junior; 15 - Connor Justus - Sophomore; 16 - Coleman Poje - Junior; 21 - Cole Miller - (redshirt) Sophomore	Outfielders: 5 - Keenan Innis - Sophomore; 6 - Ryan Peurifoy - Sophomore; 25 - Kel Johnson - Freshman; 35 - Daniel Spingola - Senior

=== Coaching staff ===
Name	Position	Seasons at Georgia Tech	Alma mater
Danny Hall	Head coach	22	Miami University (1977)
Jason Howell	Assistant coach	3	University of North Carolina (2002)
Bryan Prince	Assistant coach	8	Georgia Institute of Technology (2005)

== Season ==
=== Preseason ===
The Yellow Jackets opened their season with three games at home against a pair of opponents: St. John's and Fordham. Georgia Tech was originally scheduled to also face Liberty, but the game was cancelled due to impending cold weather. The Yellow Jackets opened their season on February 13 against regularly scheduled opponent St. John's, and defeated the Red Storm, 17–3. Georgia Tech scored six runs in the first inning in the victory.

== Schedule ==
Legend
	Georgia Tech win
	Georgia Tech loss
	Postponement
**Bold**	Georgia Tech team member

2015 Georgia Tech Yellow Jackets baseball game log
Regular season
February

Date	Opponent	Rank	Site/stadium	Score	Win	Loss	Save	Attendance	Overall record	ACC Record
February 13	#29 St. John's	#26	Russ Chandler Stadium • Atlanta, GA	17–3	**King** (1–0)	McCormick (0–1)		1,243	1–0	–
February 14	Fordham	#26	Russ Chandler Stadium • Atlanta, GA	4–9					1–1	—
February 14	Fordham	#26	Russ Chandler Stadium • Atlanta, GA	7–5	#26				2–1	—
February 15	at Liberty	#26	Russ Chandler Stadium • Atlanta, GA	Cancelled						
February 17	at Georgia Southern	#28	J. I. Clements Stadium • Statesboro, GA	7–4					3–1	—
February 20	vs. FIU	#28	Springs Brooks Stadium • Conway, SC	16–9					4–1	—
February 21	at Coastal Carolina	#28	Springs Brooks Stadium • Conway, SC	5–7					4–2	—
February 22	vs. Albany	#28	TicketReturn.com Field • Myrtle Beach, SC	9–8					5–2	—
February 24	at Auburn	#27	Plainsman Park • Auburn, AL	1–7					5–3	—
February 25	Georgia State	#27	Russ Chandler Stadium • Atlanta, GA	Cancelled						
February 27	Indiana State	#27	Russ Chandler Stadium • Atlanta, GA	1–0					6–3	—
February 28	Indiana State	#27	Russ Chandler Stadium • Atlanta, GA	15–2					7–3	—

March

Date	Opponent	Rank	Site/stadium	Score	Win	Loss	Save	Attendance	Overall record	ACC Record
March 1	Indiana State	#27	Russ Chandler Stadium • Atlanta, GA	7–1					8–3	—
March 3	Ohio	#28	Russ Chandler Stadium • Atlanta, GA	7–6 ^{12}					9–3	—
March 6	#25 Notre Dame	#28	Russ Chandler Stadium • Atlanta, GA	2–3 ^{10}					9–4	0-1
March 7	#25 Notre Dame	#28	Russ Chandler Stadium • Atlanta, GA	11–7					10–4	1-1
March 8	#25 Notre Dame	#28	Russ Chandler Stadium • Atlanta, GA	4–1					11–4	2-1
March 10	Georgia Southern	#26	Russ Chandler Stadium • Atlanta, GA	22–6					12–4	—
March 13	at Duke	#26	Jack Coombs Field • Durham, NC	5–2					13–4	3-1
March 14	at Duke	#26	Jack Coombs Field • Durham, NC	3–6					13–5	3-2
March 15	at Duke	#26	Jack Coombs Field • Durham, NC	4–0					14–5	4-2
March 17	at Kennesaw State		Fred Stillwell Stadium • Kennesaw, GA	7–6 ^{11}					15–5	—
March 20	#27 North Carolina		Russ Chandler Stadium • Atlanta, GA	3–5					15–6	4-3
March 21	#27 North Carolina		Russ Chandler Stadium • Atlanta, GA	6–5					16–6	5-3
March 22	#27 North Carolina		Russ Chandler Stadium • Atlanta, GA	1–5					16–7	5-4
March 24	Auburn	#28	Russ Chandler Stadium • Atlanta, GA	4–1					17–7	—
March 27	at #11 Louisville	#28	Jim Patterson Stadium • Louisville, KY	1–4					17–8	5-5
March 28	at #11 Louisville	#28	Jim Patterson Stadium • Louisville, KY	3–8					17–9	5-6
March 29	at #11 Louisville	#28	Jim Patterson Stadium • Louisville, KY	1–4					17–10	5-7
March 31	at Georgia		Foley Field • Athens, GA	13–6					18–10	—

April

Date	Opponent	Rank	Site/stadium	Score	Win	Loss	Save	Attendance	Overall record	ACC Record
April 1	at Georgia State		GSU Baseball Complex • Decatur, GA	6–3					19–10	—
April 3	at Virginia Tech		English Field • Blacksburg, VA	11–5					20–10	6-7
April 4	at Virginia Tech		English Field • Blacksburg, VA	8–9					20–11	6-8
April 5	at Virginia Tech		English Field • Blacksburg, VA	7–6					21–11	7-8
April 7	Mercer		Russ Chandler Stadium • Atlanta, GA	4–3					22–11	—
April 10	Virginia		Russ Chandler Stadium • Atlanta, GA	4–14					22–12	7-9
April 11	Virginia		Russ Chandler Stadium • Atlanta, GA	11–4					23–12	8-9
April 12	Virginia		Russ Chandler Stadium • Atlanta, GA	4–3					24–12	9-9
April 14	Georgia		Russ Chandler Stadium • Atlanta, GA	Cancelled						
April 17	at Boston College	#24	Pellagrini Diamond • Chestnut Hill, MA	0–1					24–13	9-10
April 18	at Boston College	#24	Pellagrini Diamond • Chestnut Hill, MA	1–6					24–14	9-11
April 19	at Boston College	#24	Pellagrini Diamond • Chestnut Hill, MA	0–4					24–15	9-12
April 21	Kennesaw State		Russ Chandler Stadium • Atlanta, GA	6–11					24–16	—
April 24	Clemson		Russ Chandler Stadium • Atlanta, GA	4–2					25–16	10-12
April 25	Clemson		Russ Chandler Stadium • Atlanta, GA	3–11					25–17	10-13
April 26	Clemson		Russ Chandler Stadium • Atlanta, GA	5–4 ^{10}					26–17	11-13

May

Date	Opponent	Rank	Site/stadium	Score	Win	Loss	Save	Attendance	Overall record	ACC Record
May 2	Presbyterian		Russ Chandler Stadium • Atlanta, GA	5–1					27–17	—
May 2	Presbyterian		Russ Chandler Stadium • Atlanta, GA	11–9					28–17	—
May 3	Presbyterian		Russ Chandler Stadium • Atlanta, GA	10–2					29–17	—
May 6	at Mercer		Claude Smith Field • Macon, GA	9–7					30–17	—
May 8	Pittsburgh		Russ Chandler Stadium • Atlanta, GA	9–1					31–17	12-13
May 9	Pittsburgh		Russ Chandler Stadium • Atlanta, GA	6–8					31–18	12-14
May 10	Pittsburgh		Russ Chandler Stadium • Atlanta, GA	10–3					32–18	13-14
May 12	vs. Georgia		Turner Field • Atlanta, GA	0–6					32–19	—
May 14	at #7 Miami (FL)		Alex Rodriguez Park at Mark Light Field • Coral Gables, FL	0–3					32–20	13-15
May 15	at #7 Miami (FL)		Alex Rodriguez Park • Coral Gables, FL	1–22					32–21	13-16
May 16	at #7 Miami (FL)		Alex Rodriguez Park • Coral Gables, FL	4–17					32–22	13-17

Post-season
ACC Tournament

Date	Opponent	Rank	Site/stadium	Score	Win	Loss	Save	Attendance	Overall record	ACCT Record
May 19	#29 Virginia		Durham Bulls Athletic Park • Durham, NC	0–11 ^{7 (Mercy Rule)}					32–23	0-1

All rankings from Collegiate Baseball.

== Rankings ==
Ranking movements Legend: ██ Increase in ranking ██ Decrease in ranking — = Not ranked
	Week																		
Poll	Pre	1	2	3	4	5	6	7	8	9	10	11	12	13	14	15	16	17	Final
Coaches'	—	—*	—	—	—	—	—	—	—	—	—	—	—	—	—	—	—	—	—
Baseball America	—	—	—	—	—	23	—	—	—	—	—	—	—	—	—	—	—	—	—
Collegiate Baseball^	26	28	27	28	26	—	28	—	—	24	—	—	—	—	—	—	—	—	—
NCBWA†	—	—	—	—	—	—	—	—	—	29	—	—	—	—	—	—	—	—	—

^ Collegiate Baseball ranked 40 teams in their preseason poll, but only ranked 30 teams weekly during the season.
† NCBWA ranks 30 teams in their preseason poll, but only ranks 25 teams weekly during the season.
* A new poll was not released for this week, so for comparison purposes, the previous week's ranking is inserted in this week's slot.
