= 2015 Virginia Tech Hokies baseball team =

American college baseball season

2015 Virginia Tech Hokies baseball
- Conference: Atlantic Coast Conference
- Record: 0–0 (0–0 ACC)
- Head coach: Pat Mason (2nd season)
- Assistant coaches: Robert Woodard (2nd season); Ryan Connolly (1st season)
- Home stadium: English Field

2015 Atlantic Coast Conference baseball standings
	Conf.				Overall
Team	W		L	PCT	W		L	PCT
Atlantic
No. 10 Louisville ^{x}‍‍‍^{y}	25	–	5	.833	47	–	18	.723
No. 26 Notre Dame ‍‍‍^{y}	17	–	13	.567	37	–	23	.617
No. 12 Florida State ‍‍‡‍^{y}	17	–	13	.567	44	–	21	.677
Clemson ‍‍‍^{y}	16	–	13	.552	32	–	29	.525
NC State ‍‍‍^{y}	15	–	14	.517	36	–	23	.610
Wake Forest ‍‍‍	12	–	18	.400	27	–	26	.509
Boston College ‍‍‍	10	–	19	.345	27	–	27	.500
Coastal
No. 6 Miami (FL) ^{x}‍‍‍^{y}	22	–	8	.733	50	–	16	.758
No. 1 Virginia ‍‍‍^{y}	15	–	15	.500	44	–	24	.647
North Carolina ‍‍‍	13	–	16	.448	34	–	24	.586
Virginia Tech ‍‍‍	13	–	16	.448	27	–	27	.500
Georgia Tech ‍‍‍	13	–	17	.433	32	–	23	.582
Duke ‍‍‍	10	–	19	.345	31	–	22	.585
Pittsburgh ‍‍‍	9	–	21	.300	20	–	32	.385
x – Division champion ‡ – Tournament champion y – Invited to the NCAA tournament As of June 30, 2015; Rankings from Collegiate Baseball

The 2015 Virginia Tech Hokies baseball team represented Virginia Tech during the 2015 NCAA Division I baseball season. The Hokies played their home games at English Field as a member of the Atlantic Coast Conference. They were led by head coach Pat Mason, in his second season at Virginia Tech.

== Previous season ==
In 2014, the Hokies finished the season 7th in the ACC's Coastal Division with a record of 21–31–1, 9–21 in conference play. They failed to qualify for the 2014 Atlantic Coast Conference baseball tournament or the 2014 NCAA Division I baseball tournament.

== Personnel ==
=== Roster ===
2015 Virginia Tech Hokies roster
Pitchers: 9 - Kit Scheetz - (redshirt) Sophomore; 11 - Luis Collazo - Junior; 17 - Luke Scherzer - Sophomore; 23 - Jon Woodcock - (redshirt) Junior; 25 - Sean Keselica - Senior; 29 - Sean Kennedy - Junior; 31 - Aaron McGarity - Sophomore; 32 - JD Doran - Senior; 33 - Andrew McDonald - Sophomore; 37 - Stuart Springer - (redshirt) Junior	Catchers: 30 - Andrew Mogg - Junior; Infielders: 2 - Ricky Surum - Sophomore; 3 - Garrett Hudson - (redshirt) Freshman; 5 - Erik Payne - (redshirt) Senior; 8 - Alex Perez - Senior; 10 - Rahiem Cooper - Junior; 13 - Miguel Ceballas - Sophomore; 14 - Ryan Tufts - Sophomore; 15 - Phil Sciretta - Junior; 16 - Ryan Burns - (redshirt) Junior; 21 - Sam Fragale - (redshirt) Freshman; 24 - Mac Caples - Sophomore; 34 - Brendon Hayden - Senior; 41 - Matt Dauby - Junior	Outfielders: 4 - Kyle Wernicki - (redshirt) Senior; 6 - Logan Bible - (redshirt) Junior; 12 - Tom Stoffel - Sophomore; 18 - Saige Jenco - (redshirt) Sophomore; 26 - Nick Anderson - (redshirt) Freshman

=== Coaching staff ===
Name	Position	Seasons at Virginia Tech	Alma mater
Pat Mason	Head coach	2	Northeastern University (1997)
Robert Woodard	Assistant coach	2	University of North Carolina (2008)
Ryan Connolly	Assistant coach	1	University of Notre Dame (2009)

== Schedule ==
Legend
	Virginia Tech win
	Virginia Tech loss
	Postponement
**Bold**	Virginia Tech team member

2015 Virginia Tech Hokies baseball game log
Regular season
February

#	Date	Opponent	Rank	Site/stadium	Score	Win	Loss	Save	Attendance	Overall record	ACC Record
1	February 13	at Mercer		Claude Smith Field • Macon, GA							
2	February 14	at Mercer		Claude Smith Field • Macon, GA							
3	February 15	at Mercer		Claude Smith Field • Macon, GA							
4	February 20	vs. Rider		Jim Perry Stadium • Buies Creek, NC							
5	February 20	at Campbell		Jim Perry Stadium • Buies Creek, NC							
6	February 21	vs. Rider		Jim Perry Stadium • Buies Creek, NC							
7	February 22	at Campbell		Jim Perry Stadium • Buies Creek, NC							
8	February 24	Radford		English Field • Blacksburg, VA							
9	February 27	Toledo		English Field • Blacksburg, VA							
10	February 28	Toledo		English Field • Blacksburg, VA							
11	February 28	Toledo		English Field • Blacksburg, VA							

March

#	Date	Opponent	Rank	Site/stadium	Score	Win	Loss	Save	Attendance	Overall record	ACC Record
12	March 1	Toledo		English Field • Blacksburg, VA							
13	March 3	College of Charleston		English Field • Blacksburg, VA							
14	March 4	College of Charleston		English Field • Blacksburg, VA							
15	March 6	at Wake Forest		Wake Forest Baseball Park • Winston-Salem, NC							
16	March 7	at Wake Forest		Wake Forest Baseball Park • Winston-Salem, NC							
17	March 8	at Wake Forest		Wake Forest Baseball Park • Winston-Salem, NC							
18	March 10	at William & Mary		Plumeri Park • Williamsburg, VA							
19	March 11	at William & Mary		Plumeri Park • Williamsburg, VA							
20	March 13	Virginia		English Field • Blacksburg, VA							
21	March 14	Virginia		English Field • Blacksburg, VA							
22	March 15	Virginia		English Field • Blacksburg, VA							
23	March 17	Liberty		English Field • Blacksburg, VA							
24	March 18	Radford		English Field • Blacksburg, VA							
25	March 20	Clemson		English Field • Blacksburg, VA							
26	March 21	Clemson		English Field • Blacksburg, VA							
27	March 22	Clemson		English Field • Blacksburg, VA							
28	March 24	Norfolk State		English Field • Blacksburg, VA							
29	March 25	East Tennessee State		English Field • Blacksburg, VA							
30	March 27	at Florida State		Dick Howser Stadium • Tallahassee, FL							
31	March 28	at Florida State		Dick Howser Stadium • Tallahassee, FL							
32	March 29	at Florida State		Dick Howser Stadium • Tallahassee, FL							
33	March 31	VMI		English Field • Blacksburg, VA							

April

#	Date	Opponent	Rank	Site/stadium	Score	Win	Loss	Save	Attendance	Overall record	ACC Record
34	April 3	Georgia Tech		English Field • Blacksburg, VA							
35	April 4	Georgia Tech		English Field • Blacksburg, VA							
36	April 5	Georgia Tech		English Field • Blacksburg, VA							
37	April 7	Charlotte		English Field • Blacksburg, VA							
38	April 10	at Miami (FL)		Alex Rodriguez Park at Mark Light Field • Coral Gables, FL							
39	April 11	at Miami (FL)		Alex Rodriguez Park • Coral Gables, FL							
40	April 12	at Miami (FL)		Alex Rodriguez Park • Coral Gables, FL							
41	April 15	at East Tennessee State		Thomas Stadium • Johnson City, TN							
42	April 17	North Carolina		English Field • Blacksburg, VA							
43	April 18	North Carolina		English Field • Blacksburg, VA							
44	April 19	North Carolina		English Field • Blacksburg, VA							
45	April 21	at Radford		Radford Baseball Stadium • Radford, VA							
46	April 24	at Duke		Jack Coombs Field • Durham, NC							
47	April 25	at Duke		Durham Bulls Athletic Park • Durham, NC							
48	April 26	at Duke		Jack Coombs Field • Durham, NC							
49	April 28	Appalachian State		English Field • Blacksburg, VA							

May

#	Date	Opponent	Rank	Site/stadium	Score	Win	Loss	Save	Attendance	Overall record	ACC Record
50	May 1	Boston College		English Field • Blacksburg, VA							
51	May 2	Boston College		English Field • Blacksburg, VA							
52	May 3	Boston College		English Field • Blacksburg, VA							
53	May 5	West Virginia		English Field • Blacksburg, VA							
54	May 14	at Pittsburgh		Charles L. Cost Field • Pittsburgh, PA							
55	May 15	at Pittsburgh		Charles L. Cost Field • Pittsburgh, PA							
56	May 16	at Pittsburgh		Charles L. Cost Field • Pittsburgh, PA							

Postseason
ACC Tournament

#	Date	Opponent	Rank	Site/stadium	Score	Win	Loss	Save	Attendance	Overall record	Tourn. Record
	May 19	TBD		Durham Bulls Athletic Park • Durham, NC							

All rankings from Collegiate Baseball.
