= 2015 Wake Forest Demon Deacons baseball team =

American college baseball season

2015 Wake Forest Demon Deacons baseball
- Conference: Atlantic Coast Conference
- Record: 27–26 (12–18 ACC)
- Head coach: Tom Walter (6th season)
- Assistant coaches: Bill Cilento (6th season); Matt Hobbs (2nd season)
- Home stadium: Gene Hooks Field at Wake Forest Baseball Park

2015 Atlantic Coast Conference baseball standings
	Conf.				Overall
Team	W		L	PCT	W		L	PCT
Atlantic
No. 10 Louisville ^{x}‍‍‍^{y}	25	–	5	.833	47	–	18	.723
No. 26 Notre Dame ‍‍‍^{y}	17	–	13	.567	37	–	23	.617
No. 12 Florida State ‍‍‡‍^{y}	17	–	13	.567	44	–	21	.677
Clemson ‍‍‍^{y}	16	–	13	.552	32	–	29	.525
NC State ‍‍‍^{y}	15	–	14	.517	36	–	23	.610
Wake Forest ‍‍‍	12	–	18	.400	27	–	26	.509
Boston College ‍‍‍	10	–	19	.345	27	–	27	.500
Coastal
No. 6 Miami (FL) ^{x}‍‍‍^{y}	22	–	8	.733	50	–	16	.758
No. 1 Virginia ‍‍‍^{y}	15	–	15	.500	44	–	24	.647
North Carolina ‍‍‍	13	–	16	.448	34	–	24	.586
Virginia Tech ‍‍‍	13	–	16	.448	27	–	27	.500
Georgia Tech ‍‍‍	13	–	17	.433	32	–	23	.582
Duke ‍‍‍	10	–	19	.345	31	–	22	.585
Pittsburgh ‍‍‍	9	–	21	.300	20	–	32	.385
x – Division champion ‡ – Tournament champion y – Invited to the NCAA tournament As of June 30, 2015; Rankings from Collegiate Baseball

The 2015 Wake Forest Demon Deacons baseball team represented Wake Forest University during the 2015 NCAA Division I baseball season. The Demon Deacons played their home games at Gene Hooks Field at Wake Forest Baseball Park as a member of the Atlantic Coast Conference. They were led by head coach Tom Walter, in his sixth season at Wake Forest.

== Previous season ==
In 2014, the Demon Deacons finished the season 4th in the ACC's Atlantic Division with a record of 30–26, 15–15 in conference play. They qualified for the 2014 Atlantic Coast Conference baseball tournament, and were eliminated in the play-in round. They failed to qualify for the 2014 NCAA Division I baseball tournament.

== Personnel ==
=== Roster ===
2015 Wake Forest Demon Deacons roster
Pitchers: 1 – Matt Pirro – Senior; 18 – Aaron Fossas – (redshirt) Junior; 19 – Patrick Bryant – Freshman; 25 – Anthony Romanelli – Freshman; 27 – Parker Johnson – (redshirt) Freshman; 30 – Connor Johnstone – Sophomore; 32 – Chris Farish – (redshirt) Freshman; 33 – Will Finley – (redshirt) Junior; 34 – Max Tishman – (redshirt) Sophomore; 35 – Christian Bartholomew – (redshirt) Sophomore; 36 – Parker Dunshee – Sophomore; 37 – Andrew Loepprich – Freshman; 42 – Paul Kirkpatrick – Freshman; 45 – John McCarren – Sophomore; 55 – Andrew Culp – (redshirt) Freshman	Catchers: 9 – Ben Breazeale – Sophomore; 28 – Garrett Kelly – Junior; 38 – Larry Mascolino – (redshirt) Freshman; 39 – Nick Bigplinghoff – (redshirt) Freshman; 41 – Chris Schafer – Freshman; Infielders: 5 – Drew Freedman – Freshman; 6 – Zach Piazza – (redshirt) Freshman; 8 – Joey Rodriguez – Junior; 10 – Nate Mondou – Sophomore; 12 – Joe Napolitano – (redshirt) Junior; 12 – Keegan Maronpot – Freshman; 17 – Bruce Steel – Freshman; 20 – Justin Yurchak – Freshman; 22 – Will Craig – Sophomore; 26 – Aaron Smith – (redshirt) Freshman; 40 – Matt Graziano – Freshman	Outfielders: 2 – Seth Constable – (redshirt) Junior; 3 – Eric Ramsey – (redshirt) Sophomore; 4 – Stuart Fairchild – Freshman; 7 – Kevin Conway – (redshirt) Junior; 11 – Jonathan Pryor – Sophomore; 14 – Donnie Sellers – Freshman; 15 – Luke Czajkowski – Junior; 21 – Kevin Jordan – (redshirt) Senior; 24 – Gavin Sheets – Freshman

=== Coaching staff ===
Name	Position	Seasons at Wake Forest	Alma mater
Tom Walter	Head coach	6	Georgetown University (1991)
Bill Cilento	Assistant coach	6	Siena College (2003)
Matt Hobbs	Assistant coach	2	University of Missouri (2002)

== Schedule ==
Legend
	Wake Forest win
	Wake Forest loss
	Postponement
**Bold**	Wake Forest team member

2015 Wake Forest Demon Deacons baseball game log
Regular season
February

#	Date	Opponent	Rank	Site/stadium	Score	Win	Loss	Save	Attendance	Overall record	ACC Record
1	February 13	Delaware		Wake Forest Baseball Park • Winston-Salem, NC							
2	February 14	Delaware		Wake Forest Baseball Park • Winston-Salem, NC							
3	February 15	Bucknell		Wake Forest Baseball Park • Winston-Salem, NC							
4	February 15	VCU		Wake Forest Baseball Park • Winston-Salem, NC							
5	February 17	at Davidson		T. Henry Wilson, Jr. Field • Davidson, NC							
6	February 20	vs. George Mason		Brooks Field • Wilmington, NC							
7	February 21	vs. Western Carolina		Brooks Field • Wilmington, NC							
8	February 22	at UNC Wilmington		Brooks Field • Wilmington, NC							
9	February 24	Appalachian State		Wake Forest Baseball Park • Winston-Salem, NC							
10	February 27	Towson		Wake Forest Baseball Park • Winston-Salem, NC							
11	February 28	Marshall		Wake Forest Baseball Park • Winston-Salem, NC							

March

#	Date	Opponent	Rank	Site/stadium	Score	Win	Loss	Save	Attendance	Overall record	ACC Record
12	March 1	Towson		Wake Forest Baseball Park • Winston-Salem, NC							
13	March 1	Marshall		Wake Forest Baseball Park • Winston-Salem, NC							
13	March 3	at UNC Greensboro		UNCG Baseball Stadium • Greensboro, NC							
14	March 6	Virginia Tech		Wake Forest Baseball Park • Winston-Salem, NC							
15	March 7	Virginia Tech		Wake Forest Baseball Park • Winston-Salem, NC							
16	March 8	Virginia Tech		Wake Forest Baseball Park • Winston-Salem, NC							
17	March 10	at Elon		Walter C. Latham Park • Elon, NC							
18	March 11	Elon		Wake Forest Baseball Park • Winston-Salem, NC							
19	March 13	at Florida State		Dick Howser Stadium • Tallahassee, FL							
21	March 14	at Florida State		Dick Howser Stadium • Tallahassee, FL							
22	March 15	at Florida State		Dick Howser Stadium • Tallahassee, FL							
23	March 17	Connecticut		Wake Forest Baseball Park • Winston-Salem, NC							
24	March 20	Miami (FL)		Wake Forest Baseball Park • Winston-Salem, NC							
25	March 21	Miami (FL)		Wake Forest Baseball Park • Winston-Salem, NC							
26	March 22	Miami (FL)		Wake Forest Baseball Park • Winston-Salem, NC							
27	March 24	at Appalachian State		Smith Stadium • Boone, NC							
28	March 25	Charlotte		Wake Forest Baseball Park • Winston-Salem, NC							
29	March 27	at Clemson		Doug Kingsmore Stadium • Clemson, SC							
30	March 28	at Clemson		Doug Kingsmore Stadium • Clemson, SC							
31	March 29	at Clemson		Doug Kingsmore Stadium • Clemson, SC							
32	March 31	Coastal Carolina		Wake Forest Baseball Park • Winston-Salem, NC							

April

#	Date	Opponent	Rank	Site/stadium	Score	Win	Loss	Save	Attendance	Overall record	ACC Record
33	April 3	Boston College		Wake Forest Baseball Park • Winston-Salem, NC							
34	April 4	Boston College		Wake Forest Baseball Park • Winston-Salem, NC							
35	April 5	Boston College		Wake Forest Baseball Park • Winston-Salem, NC							
36	April 7	UNC Greensboro		Wake Forest Baseball Park • Winston-Salem, NC							
37	April 10	at Pittsburgh		Charles L. Cost Field • Pittsburgh, PA							
38	April 11	at Pittsburgh		Charles L. Cost Field • Pittsburgh, PA							
39	April 12	at Pittsburgh		Charles L. Cost Field • Pittsburgh, PA							
40	April 14	Davidson		Wake Forest Baseball Park • Winston-Salem, NC							
41	April 17	at Louisville		Jim Patterson Stadium • Louisville, KY							
42	April 18	at Louisville		Jim Patterson Stadium • Louisville, KY							
43	April 19	at Louisville		Jim Patterson Stadium • Louisville, KY							
44	April 21	at Charlotte		Robert and Mariam Hayes Stadium • Charlotte, NC							
45	April 24	Notre Dame		Wake Forest Baseball Park • Winston-Salem, NC							
46	April 25	Notre Dame		Wake Forest Baseball Park • Winston-Salem, NC							
47	April 26	Notre Dame		Wake Forest Baseball Park • Winston-Salem, NC							
48	April 28	High Point		Wake Forest Baseball Park • Winston-Salem, NC							
49	April 29	at High Point		Williard Stadium • High Point, NC							

May

#	Date	Opponent	Rank	Site/stadium	Score	Win	Loss	Save	Attendance	Overall record	ACC Record
50	May 8	NC State		Wake Forest Baseball Park • Winston-Salem, NC							
51	May 9	NC State		Wake Forest Baseball Park • Winston-Salem, NC							
52	May 10	NC State		Wake Forest Baseball Park • Winston-Salem, NC							
53	May 12	at Coastal Carolina		Charles Watson Stadium • Conway, SC							
54	May 14	at Duke		Jack Coombs Field • Durham, NC							
55	May 15	at Duke		Jack Coombs Field • Durham, NC							
56	May 16	at Duke		Jack Coombs Field • Durham, NC							

Post-season
ACC Tournament

#	Date	Opponent	Rank	Site/stadium	Score	Win	Loss	Save	Attendance	Overall record	Tourn. Record
	May 19	TBD		Durham Bulls Athletic Park • Durham, NC							

All rankings from Collegiate Baseball.
