= Chris Pollard =

American baseball coach

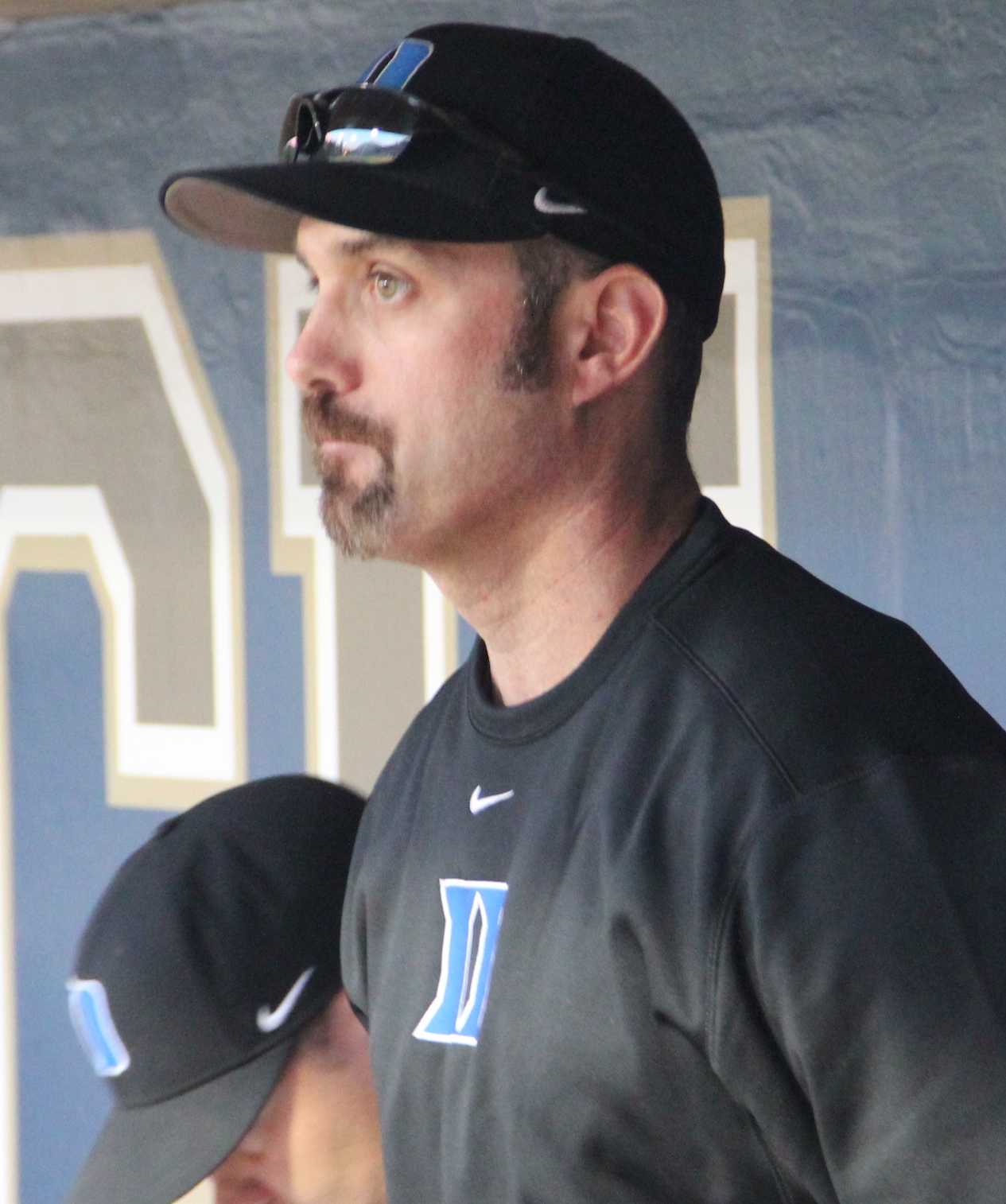
- Pollard in 2014

Current position
- Title: Head coach
- Team: Virginia
- Conference: ACC
- Record: 37–23 (.617)

Biographical details
- Born: Durham, North Carolina, U.S.
- Education: Davidson '96

Playing career
- 1993–1996: Davidson
- 1996: Sioux Falls Canaries
- 1996: Salinas Peppers
- Position: P

Coaching career (HC unless noted)
- 1998: Durham Braves
- 1999: Davidson (asst.)
- 2000–2004: Pfeiffer
- 2005–2012: Appalachian State
- 2013–2025: Duke
- 2026–present: Virginia

Administrative career (AD unless noted)
- 2003–2004: Pfeiffer

Head coaching record
- Overall: 842–635–2 (.570)
- Tournaments: NCAA: 21–19; ACC: 13–6; SoCon: 10–14

Accomplishments and honors

Championships
- 2x Conference Carolinas: 2003, 2004; SoCon: 2012; 2x ACC tournament: 2021, 2024

Awards
- Conference Carolinas Coach of the Year: 2004 SoCon Coach of the Year: 2012

Chris Pollard is an American baseball coach and former pitcher, who is the head coach of the Virginia Cavaliers. He played college baseball at Davidson for head coach Dick Cooke from 1993 to 1996 before playing professionally in 1996. He then served as the head coach of the Pfeiffer Falcons (2000–2004), Appalachian State Mountaineers (2005-2012) and Duke Blue Devils (2013-2025).

== Playing career ==
Pollard is from Amherst County, Virginia, and attended high school at Virginia Episcopal School and college at Davidson College and played for the Wildcats baseball team for four years. He pitched in the competitive Southern Conference, and ranks third all-time at Davidson in wins. He also ranks highly in the Davidson record books for strikeouts, appearances, starts, innings pitched, complete games and shutouts. As a sophomore, he earned wins over #1 ranked Georgia Tech and #25 ranked Western Carolina. He also earned the win in both games of a double header against Georgia Southern as a junior. After graduating in 1996, Pollard played in the independent Western League and Northern League before beginning his coaching career.

== Coaching career ==
Pollard began his coaching career as an assistant at Davidson. After one season, he became head coach at Division II member Pfeiffer, which he rebuilt over five seasons. In his final season, the Falcons set a school record for wins with a record of 41–14 and their second consecutive Carolinas-Virginia Athletic Conference championship. Pollard was named conference Coach of the Year, and was also rewarded with the head coaching position at Appalachian State, a Southern Conference rival of his alma mater Davidson. Pollard spent eight seasons with the Mountaineers, claiming the school's first conference championship since 1987 in his final 2012 campaign. ASU's at-large trip to the 2012 NCAA tournament ended just one win shy of a Super Regional. Pollard was named head coach at Duke shortly after the end of the tournament run.

== Head coaching record ==
Below are tables of Pollard's yearly records as an NCAA and collegiate summer baseball head coach.

=== NCAA ===
Record table
Season	Team	Overall	Conference	Standing	Postseason
Pfeiffer University Falcons (Conference Carolinas) (2000–2004)
2000	Pfeiffer University	20–28	10–15	8th	
2001	Pfeiffer University	21–26	11–12	6th	
2002	Pfeiffer University	26–23–1	11–14	8th	
2003	Pfeiffer University	33–17	16–10	3rd	
2004	Pfeiffer University	41–14	18–6	1st	
Pfeiffer University:		141–108–1 (.566)	66–57 (.537)		
Appalachian State Mountaineers (Southern Conference) (2005–2012)
2005	Appalachian State	10–42	5–24	11th	
2006	Appalachian State	24–31	9–18	8th	
2007	Appalachian State	33–26	14–13	T–4th	
2008	Appalachian State	32–27	14–13	T–6th	
2009	Appalachian State	33–21	15–13	6th	
2010	Appalachian State	38–18–1	14–14–1	7th	
2011	Appalachian State	33–27	15–15	6th	
2012	Appalachian State	41–18	21–9	T–1st	NCAA Regional
Appalachian State:		244–210–1 (.537)	107–119–1 (.474)		
Duke Blue Devils (Atlantic Coast Conference) (2013–2025)
2013	Duke	26–29	9–21	6th (Coastal)	
2014	Duke	33–25	16–14	3rd (Coastal)	
2015	Duke	31–22	10–19	6th (Coastal)	
2016	Duke	33–24	14–15	3rd (Coastal)	NCAA Regional
2017	Duke	30–28	12–19	4th (Coastal)	
2018	Duke	45–18	18–11	2nd (Coastal)	NCAA Super Regional
2019	Duke	35–27	15-15	4th (Coastal)	NCAA Super Regional
2020	Duke	12–4	2–1	(Coastal)	Season canceled due to COVID-19
2021	Duke	33–22	16–17	5th (Coastal)	NCAA Regional
2022	Duke	22–32	10–20	7th (Coastal)	
2023	Duke	39–24	16–13	3rd (Coastal)	NCAA Super Regional
2024	Duke	40–20	16–14	3rd (Coastal)	NCAA Regional
2025	Duke	41–21	17–13	7th	NCAA Super Regional
Duke:		420–296 (.587)	171–192 (.471)		
Virginia Cavaliers (Atlantic Coast Conference) (2026–present)
2026	Virginia	37–23	14–16	T–8th	NCAA Regional
Virginia:		37–23 (.617)	14–16 (.467)		
Total:		842–635–2 (.570)			
National champion Postseason invitational champion Conference regular season champion Conference regular season and conference tournament champion Division regular season champion Division regular season and conference tournament champion Conference tournament champion

=== Collegiate summer baseball ===
==== Coastal Plain League ====
Season	Team	Record	Standing	playoffs
1998	Durham	24–23	4th	
Total		24–23		

== See also ==
- List of current NCAA Division I baseball coaches
