= 2015 Miami Hurricanes baseball team =

American college baseball season

2015 Miami Hurricanes baseball

ACC Coastal Division Champion Coral Gables Regional Champion Coral Gables Super Regional Champion

College World Series
- Conference: Atlantic Coast Conference

Ranking
- Coaches: No. 6
- CB: No. 6
- Record: 50–17 (22–8 ACC)
- Head coach: Jim Morris (22nd season)
- Assistant coaches: Gino DiMare (16th season); J.D. Arteaga (13th season); Michael DeLucia (1st season)
- Home stadium: Alex Rodriguez Park at Mark Light Field

2015 Atlantic Coast Conference baseball standings
	Conf.				Overall
Team	W		L	PCT	W		L	PCT
Atlantic
No. 10 Louisville ^{x}‍‍‍^{y}	25	–	5	.833	47	–	18	.723
No. 26 Notre Dame ‍‍‍^{y}	17	–	13	.567	37	–	23	.617
No. 12 Florida State ‍‍‡‍^{y}	17	–	13	.567	44	–	21	.677
Clemson ‍‍‍^{y}	16	–	13	.552	32	–	29	.525
NC State ‍‍‍^{y}	15	–	14	.517	36	–	23	.610
Wake Forest ‍‍‍	12	–	18	.400	27	–	26	.509
Boston College ‍‍‍	10	–	19	.345	27	–	27	.500
Coastal
No. 6 Miami (FL) ^{x}‍‍‍^{y}	22	–	8	.733	50	–	16	.758
No. 1 Virginia ‍‍‍^{y}	15	–	15	.500	44	–	24	.647
North Carolina ‍‍‍	13	–	16	.448	34	–	24	.586
Virginia Tech ‍‍‍	13	–	16	.448	27	–	27	.500
Georgia Tech ‍‍‍	13	–	17	.433	32	–	23	.582
Duke ‍‍‍	10	–	19	.345	31	–	22	.585
Pittsburgh ‍‍‍	9	–	21	.300	20	–	32	.385
x – Division champion ‡ – Tournament champion y – Invited to the NCAA tournament As of June 30, 2015; Rankings from Collegiate Baseball

The 2015 Miami Hurricanes baseball team represented the University of Miami during the 2015 NCAA Division I baseball season. The Hurricanes played their home games at Alex Rodriguez Park at Mark Light Field as a member of the Atlantic Coast Conference. They were led by head coach Jim Morris, in his 22nd season at Miami.

== Previous season ==
In 2014, the Hurricanes finished the season as champions of the ACC's Coastal Division with a record of 44–19, 24–6 in conference play. They qualified for the 2014 Atlantic Coast Conference baseball tournament, and were eliminated in pool play. They qualified for the 2014 NCAA Division I baseball tournament, and were hosts of the Coral Gables regional which included Texas Tech, Columbia, and Bethune-Cookman. The Hurricanes shut out Bethune-Cookman, 1–0, in the opening game, but then fell 3–0 to Texas Tech to move into the loser's bracket. There, the Hurricanes again defeated the Wildcats, this time by a score of 10–0. In the first game of the regional final against the Red Raiders, Miami won 2–1 in 10 innings. However, in the second game, Texas Tech won 4–0 and advanced to the Lubbock Super Regional, and subsequently the College World Series.

== Personnel ==
=== Roster ===
2015 Miami Hurricanes roster
Pitchers: 14 – Danny Garcia – Sophomore; 18 – Michael Mediavilla – Freshman; 19 – Bryan Garcia – Sophomore; 22 – Luke Spangler – Freshman; 27 – Ryan Otero – (redshirt) Junior; 30 – Andrew Suarez – (redshirt) Junior; 31 – Sam Abrams – Senior; 32 – Andy Honiotes – Freshman; 34 – Derik Beauprez – Sophomore; 35 – Devin Meyer – Freshman; 37 – Keven Pimentel – Freshman; 38 – Daniel Briggi – Senior; 39 – Cooper Hammond – Sophomore; 43 – Thomas Woodrey – Junior; 47 – Enrique Sosa – Junior; 49 – Daniel Epstein – Freshman; 52 – Daniel Sayles – Senior; 55 – Jesse Lepore – Freshman	Catchers: 0 – Zack Collins – Sophomore; 40 – Garrett Kennedy – Senior; Infielders: 4 – Johnny Ruiz – Sophomore; 7 – George Iskenderian – Junior; 8 – David Thompson – Junior; 9 – Sebastian Diaz – Sophomore; 17 – Christopher Barr – (redshirt) Sophomore; 42 – Edgar Michelangeli – Junior; 44 – Peter Crocitto – Freshman; 51 – Brandon Lopez – Junior	Outfielders: 2 – Ricky Eusebio – Junior; 10 – Justin Smith – Freshman; 13 – Willie Abreu – Sophomore; 24 – Jacob Heyward – Sophomore; 36 – Ryan Alvarez – Freshman; 45 – Carl Chester – Freshman

=== Coaching staff ===
Name	Position	Seasons at Miami	Alma mater
Jim Morris	Head coach	22	Elon University (1973)
Gino DiMare	Assistant coach	16	University of Miami (1992)
J.D. Arteaga	Assistant coach	13	University of Miami (2002)
Michael DeLucia	Assistant coach	1	Campbell University (2013)

== Schedule ==
Legend
	Miami win
	Miami loss
	Postponement
**Bold**	Miami team member

2015 Miami Hurricanes baseball game log
Regular season
February

Date	Opponent	Rank	Site/stadium	Score	Win	Loss	Save	Attendance	Overall record	ACC Record
February 13	Rutgers	#14	Alex Rodriguez Park at Mark Light Field • Coral Gables, FL	**W** 5–2	**Hammond (1–0)**	Herrmann (0–1)	**D. Garcia (1)**	2,628	1–0	
February 14	Rutgers	#14	Alex Rodriguez Park • Coral Gables, FL	**W** 9–5	**Woodrey (1–0)**	McCoy (0–1)	Otero (1)	2,620	2–0	
February 14	Rutgers	#14	Alex Rodriguez Park • Coral Gables, FL	**W** 9–3	**Sosa (1–0)**	Driscoll (0–1)	**Hammond (1)**	2,860	3–0	
February 15	Rutgers	#14	Alex Rodriguez Park • Coral Gables, FL	**W** 25–4	**Beauprez (1–0)**	Rosa (0–1)	None	2,577	4–0	
February 18	at Florida Atlantic	#14	FAU Baseball Stadium • Boca Raton, FL	**L** 3–5	Logan (1–0)	**Hammond (1–1)**	None	1,097	4–1	
February 20	at #5 Florida	#14	Alfred A. McKethan Stadium • Gainesville, FL	**L** 3–4	Lewis (1–0)	**Mediavilla (0–1)**	None	3,661	4–2	
February 21	at #5 Florida	#14	Alfred A. McKethan Stadium • Gainesville, FL	**W** 7–2	**Woodrey (2–0)**	Puk (1–1)	None	6,081	5–2	
February 22	at #5 Florida	#14	Alfred A. McKethan Stadium • Gainesville, FL	**L** 1–2	Dunning (2–0)	**Sosa (1–0)**	Lewis (1)	4,734	5–3	
February 25	Barry	#23	Alex Rodriguez Park • Coral Gables, FL	**W** 5–3	**D. Garcia (1–0)**	Hernandez (1–2)	**B. Garcia (1)**	2,181	6–3	
February 27	Wright State	#23	Alex Rodriguez Park • Coral Gables, FL	**W** 8–7	**Hammond (2–1)**	Elliott (0–1)	None	2,389	7–3	
February 28	Wright State	#23	Alex Rodriguez Park • Coral Gables, FL	**W** 4–3	**B. Garcia (1–0)**	Elliott (0–2)	None	2,418	8–3	

March

Date	Opponent	Rank	Site/stadium	Score	Win	Loss	Save	Attendance	Overall record	ACC Record
March 1	Wright State	#23	Alex Rodriguez Park • Coral Gables, FL	**L** 6–12	Randolph (1–0)	**Beauprez (1–1)**	None	2,377	8–4	
March 4	Florida Gulf Coast	#23	Alex Rodriguez Park • Coral Gables, FL	**W** 7–3	**D. Garcia (2–0)**	Koerner (2–2)	**B. Garcia (3)**	1,953	9–4	
March 6	at #24 Louisville	#23	Jim Patterson Stadium • Louisville, KY	**L** 6–9	Baird (1–0)	Woodrey (2–1)'	Harrington (2)	1,452	9–5	0–1
March 7	at #24 Louisville	#23	Jim Patterson Stadium • Louisville, KY	**W** 9–5	**Sosa (2–1)**	Kidston (0–2)	**B. Garcia (4)**	1,452	10–5	1–1
March 8	at #24 Louisville	#23	Jim Patterson Stadium • Louisville, KY	**L** 4–5	McKay (2–0)	**B. Garcia (1–1)**	None	1,492	10–6	1–2
March 10	at Florida Gulf Coast	#25	Swanson Stadium • Fort Myers, FL	**W** 15–4	**Briggi (1–0)**	Anderson (2–1)	None	1,243	11–6	
March 11	Stetson	#25	Alex Rodriguez Park • Coral Gables, FL	**W** 7–0	**D. Garcia (3–0)**	Lynch (0–2)	None	2,143	12–6	
March 13	NC State	#25	Alex Rodriguez Park • Coral Gables, FL	**W** 3–2^{10}	**B. Garcia (2–1)**	DeJuneas (1–1)	None	2,420	13–6	2–2
March 14	NC State	#25	Alex Rodriguez Park • Coral Gables, FL	**W** 9–2	**Sosa (3–1)**	Brown (2–1)	None	2,836	14–6	3–2
March 15	NC State	#25	Alex Rodriguez Park • Coral Gables, FL	**W** 6–0	**Suarez (1–0)**	Piedmonte (2–1)	None	2,502	15–6	4–2
March 17	Army	#20	Alex Rodriguez Park • Coral Gables, FL	**W** 9–1	**D. Garcia (4–0)**	Gardner (2–1)	None	2,101	16–6	
March 20	at Wake Forest	#20	Wake Forest Baseball Park • Winston-Salem, NC	**W** 15–2	**Woodrey (3–1)**	Pirro (5–1)	None	588	17–6	5–2
March 21	at Wake Forest	#20	Wake Forest Baseball Park • Winston-Salem, NC	**W** 12–7	**Suarez (2–0)**	Craig (0–1)	None	901	18–6	6–2
March 22	at Wake Forest	#20	Wake Forest Baseball Park • Winston-Salem, NC	**L** 4–10	Dunshee (4–0)	**Sosa (3–2)**	None	634	18–7	6–3
March 25	Florida Gulf Coast	#18	Alex Rodriguez Park • Coral Gables, FL	**L** 1–8	Desguin (3–0)	**D. Garcia (4–1)**	None	2,328	18–8	
March 27	at #27 North Carolina	#18	Boshamer Stadium • Chapel Hill, NC	**W** 4–3	**Hammond (3–1)**	Thornton (1–2)	**B. Garcia (5)**	1,817	19–8	7–3
March 28	at #27 North Carolina	#18	Boshamer Stadium • Chapel Hill, NC	**W** 4–3^{11}	**B. Garcia (3–1)**	Trayner (1–3)	**Hammond (2)**	2,107	20–8	8–3
March 29	at #27 North Carolina	#18	Boshamer Stadium • Chapel Hill, NC	**L** 3–10	Moss (4–0)	**Sosa (3–3)**	None	2,128	20–9	8–4

April

Date	Opponent	Rank	Site/stadium	Score	Win	Loss	Save	Attendance	Overall record	ACC Record
April 1	Bethune-Cookman	#16	Alex Rodriguez Park • Coral Gables, FL	**W** 13–3	**D. Garcia (5–1)**	Lindsay (0–4)	None	1,950	21–9	
April 3	Duke	#16	Alex Rodriguez Park • Coral Gables, FL	**W** 4–3	**Mediavilla (1–0)**	Stallings (3–4)	**B. Garcia (6)**	2,509	22–9	9–4
April 4	Duke	#16	Alex Rodriguez Park • Coral Gables, FL	**W** 3–2	**Suarez (3–0)**	Istler (2–2)	**B. Garcia (7)**	2,916	23–9	10–4
April 5	Duke	#16	Alex Rodriguez Park • Coral Gables, FL	**W** 10–0	**Sosa (4–3)**	Clark (2–2)	None	2,291	24–9	11–4
April 8	Florida Atlantic	#11	Alex Rodriguez Park • Coral Gables, FL	**W** 4–3^{10}	**B. Garcia (4–1)**	Carr (0–2)	None	2,055	25–9	
April 10	Virginia Tech	#11	Alex Rodriguez Park • Coral Gables, FL	**W** 11–1	**Woodrey (4–1)**	Keselica (4–2)	None	2,966	26–9	12–4
April 11	Virginia Tech	#11	Alex Rodriguez Park • Coral Gables, FL	**W** 14–4	**Suarez (4–0)**	Woodcock (2–2)	None	2,930	27–9	13–4
April 12	Virginia Tech	#11	Alex Rodriguez Park • Coral Gables, FL	**W** 9–1	**Sosa (5–3)**	McGarity (3–4)	None	2,625	28–9	14–4
April 15	#15 UCF	#6	Alex Rodriguez Park • Coral Gables, FL	**W** 4–2	**Mediavilla (2–1)**	Hukari (4–2)	**B. Garcia (8)**	2,184	29–9	
April 17	at Virginia	#6	Davenport Field • Charlottesville, VA	**L** 4–5	Rosenberger (1–0)	**Woodrey (4–2)**	Sborz (10)	3,589	29–10	14–5
April 18	at Virginia	#6	Davenport Field • Charlottesville, VA	**L** 2–5	Doherty (2–1)	**B. Garcia (4–2)**	Sborz (11)	4,228	29–11	14–6
April 19	at Virginia	#6	Davenport Field • Charlottesville, VA	**W** 8–6	**Abrams (1–0)**	Waddel (2–4)	**B. Garcia (9)**	3,747	30–11	15–6
April 24	#8 Florida State	#6	Alex Rodriguez Park • Coral Gables, FL	**L** 7–8^{17}	Zizrow (1–0)	**Beauprez (1–2)**	None	4,189	30–12	15–7
April 25	#8 Florida State	#6	Alex Rodriguez Park • Coral Gables, FL	**L** 5–15	Compton (2–1)	**Suarez (4–1)**	None	4,650	30–13	15–8
April 26	#8 Florida State	#6	Alex Rodriguez Park • Coral Gables, FL	**W** 12–0	**Sosa (6–3)**	Carlton (3–3)	None	3,289	31–13	16–8

May

Date	Opponent	Rank	Site/stadium	Score	Win	Loss	Save	Attendance	Overall record	ACC Record
May 2	at Pittsburgh	#10	Charles L. Cost Field • Pittsburgh, PA	**W** 9–5	Mediavilla (3–1)	Harris (3–3)	None		32–13	17–8
May 2	at Pittsburgh	#10	Charles L. Cost Field • Pittsburgh, PA	**W** 12–0	Suarez (5–1)	Sandefur (1–6)	None	502	33–13	18–8
May 3	at Pittsburgh	#10	Charles L. Cost Field • Pittsburgh, PA	**W** 9–3	D. Garcia (6–1)	Berube (1–7)	None		34–13	19–8
May 6	Bethune-Cookman	#8	Alex Rodriguez Park • Coral Gables, FL	**W** 14–0	Beauprez (2–2)	Austin (3–3)	None	2,067	35–13	
May 8	NYIT	#8	Alex Rodriguez Park • Coral Gables, FL	**W** 26–0	Woodrey (5–2)	Diaz (2–4)	None	2,359	36–19	
May 9	NYIT	#8	Alex Rodriguez Park • Coral Gables, FL	**W** 13–1	Suarez (6–1)	Plotkin (3–2)	None	2,326	37–13	
May 10	NYIT	#8	Alex Rodriguez Park • Coral Gables, FL	**W** 19–1	Sosa (7–3)	Martinez (2–6)	None	1,847	38–13	
May 12	Florida Atlantic	#7	Alex Rodriguez Park • Coral Gables, FL	**W** 14–6	Beauprez (3–2)	McKay (3–1)	None	2,014	39–13	
May 14	Georgia Tech	#7	Alex Rodriguez Park • Coral Gables, FL	**W** 3–0	Woodrey (6–1)	King (4–4)	None	2,174	40–13	20–8
May 15	Georgia Tech	#7	Alex Rodriguez Park • Coral Gables, FL	**W** 22–1	Suarez (7–1)	Parr (5–4)	None	2,499	41–13	21–8
May 16	Georgia Tech	#7	Alex Rodriguez Park • Coral Gables, FL	**W** 17–4	Hammond (4–1)	Gold (7–3)	None	2,544	42–13	22–8

Postseason
ACC Tournament

Date	Opponent	Rank	Site/stadium	Score	Win	Loss	Save	Attendance	Overall record	ACCT Record
May 20	#29 Virginia	#6	Durham Bulls Athletic Park • Durham, NC	**W** 9–5	**B. Garcia (5–2)**	Bettinger (4–4)	None	2,774	43–13	1–0
May 22	NC State	#6	Durham Bulls Athletic Park • Durham, NC	**L** 4–5^{12}	DeJuneas (3–3)	**Mediavilla (3–2)**	None	6,806	43–14	1–1
May 23	#20 Notre Dame	#6	Durham Bulls Athletic Park • Durham, NC	**W** 6–5	**Hammond (5–1)**	Bass (3–1)	None	4,249	44–14	2–1

NCAA Coral Gables Regional

Date	Opponent	Rank	Site/stadium	Score	Win	Loss	Save	Attendance	Overall record	NCAAT Record
May 29	(4) FIU	#6	Alex Rodriguez Park • Coral Gables, FL	**W** 6–2	**Suarez (8–1)**	Nunez (6–6)	None	4,817	45–14	1–0
May 30	(3) Columbia	#6	Alex Rodriguez Park • Coral Gables, FL	**W** 8–3	**Woodrey (7–2)**	Roy (6–4)	None	3,315	46–14	2–0
May 31	(3) Columbia	#6	Alex Rodriguez Park • Coral Gables, FL	**L** 0–3	Barr (3–0)	**Sosa (7–4)**	Cline (4)	2,759	46–15	2–1
June 1	(3) Columbia	#6	Alex Rodriguez Park • Coral Gables, FL	**W** 21–3	**D. Garcia (7–1)**	Weisman (4–2)	None	3,115	47–15	3–1

NCAA Coral Gables Super Regional

Date	Opponent	Rank	Site/stadium	Score	Win	Loss	Save	Attendance	Overall record	NCAAT Record
June 5	#15 VCU	#5	Alex Rodriguez Park • Coral Gables, FL	**W** 3–2	**Suarez (9–1)**	Howie (8–7)	**B. Garcia (10)**	2,853	48–15	4–1
June 6	#15 VCU	#5	Alex Rodriguez Park • Coral Gables, FL	**W** 10–3	Abrams (2–0)'	Dwyer (10–3)	None	3,680	49–15	5–1

NCAA College World Series

Date	Opponent	Rank	Site/stadium	Score	Win	Loss	Save	Attendance	Overall record	CWS Record
June 13	vs. (4) Florida	#5	TD Ameritrade Park • Omaha, NE	**L** 3–15				49–16		
June 15	vs. Arkansas	#5	TD Ameritrade Park • Omaha, NE	**W** 4–3				50–16		
June 17	vs. (4) Florida	#5	TD Ameritrade Park • Omaha, NE	**L** 2–10				50–17		

All rankings from Collegiate Baseball.

== Rankings ==
Ranking movements Legend: ██ Increase in ranking ██ Decrease in ranking
	Week																		
Poll	Pre	1	2	3	4	5	6	7	8	9	10	11	12	13	14	15	16	17	Final
Coaches'	14	14*	16	20	18	16	14	11	11	9	13	14	12	8	8	8			
Baseball America	9	8	11	11	19	17	13	12	11	9	13	17	17	13	12	12			
Collegiate Baseball^	14	14	23	23	25	20	18	16	11	6	6	10	8	7	7	6	5		
NCBWA†	13	11	13	15	19	17	15	15	11	9	13	16	13	10	9	8	8		

^ Collegiate Baseball ranked 40 teams in their preseason poll, but only ranked 30 teams weekly during the season.
† NCBWA ranks 30 teams in their preseason poll, but only ranks 25 teams weekly during the season.
* A new poll was not released for this week, so for comparison purposes, the previous week's ranking is inserted in this week's slot.

== Awards and honors ==
Zack Collins

- Louisville Slugger Pre-season First Team All-American
- Perfect Game USA Pre-season First Team All-American
- Baseball America Pre-season First Team All-American

Andrew Suarez

- Louisville Slugger Pre-season Second Team All-American

Bryan Garcia

- Louisville Slugger Pre-season Second Team All-American
- Perfect Game USA Pre-season Third Team All-American

David Thompson

- Baseball America Pre-season Second Team All-American
