= 2015 NC State Wolfpack baseball team =

American college baseball season

2015 NC State Wolfpack baseball
- Conference: Atlantic Coast Conference
- Record: 36–23 (15–14 ACC)
- Head coach: Elliott Avent (19th season)
- Assistant coaches: Chris Hart (9th season); Scott Foxhall (1st season)
- Home stadium: Doak Field

2015 Atlantic Coast Conference baseball standings
	Conf.				Overall
Team	W		L	PCT	W		L	PCT
Atlantic
No. 10 Louisville ^{x}‍‍‍^{y}	25	–	5	.833	47	–	18	.723
No. 26 Notre Dame ‍‍‍^{y}	17	–	13	.567	37	–	23	.617
No. 12 Florida State ‍‍‡‍^{y}	17	–	13	.567	44	–	21	.677
Clemson ‍‍‍^{y}	16	–	13	.552	32	–	29	.525
NC State ‍‍‍^{y}	15	–	14	.517	36	–	23	.610
Wake Forest ‍‍‍	12	–	18	.400	27	–	26	.509
Boston College ‍‍‍	10	–	19	.345	27	–	27	.500
Coastal
No. 6 Miami (FL) ^{x}‍‍‍^{y}	22	–	8	.733	50	–	16	.758
No. 1 Virginia ‍‍‍^{y}	15	–	15	.500	44	–	24	.647
North Carolina ‍‍‍	13	–	16	.448	34	–	24	.586
Virginia Tech ‍‍‍	13	–	16	.448	27	–	27	.500
Georgia Tech ‍‍‍	13	–	17	.433	32	–	23	.582
Duke ‍‍‍	10	–	19	.345	31	–	22	.585
Pittsburgh ‍‍‍	9	–	21	.300	20	–	32	.385
x – Division champion ‡ – Tournament champion y – Invited to the NCAA tournament As of June 30, 2015; Rankings from Collegiate Baseball

The 2015 NC State Wolfpack baseball team represented North Carolina State University during the 2015 NCAA Division I baseball season. The Wolfpack played their home games at Doak Field as a member of the Atlantic Coast Conference. They were led by head coach Elliott Avent, in his 19th season at NC State.

== Previous season ==
In 2014, the Wolfpack finished the season 5th in the ACC's Atlantic Division with a record of 32–23, 13–17 in conference play. They qualified for the 2014 Atlantic Coast Conference baseball tournament, and were eliminated in the play-in round. They failed to qualify for the 2014 NCAA Division I baseball tournament.

== Personnel ==
=== Roster ===
2015 NC State Wolfpack roster
Pitchers: 3 – Ryan Williamson – Sophomore; 17 – Jon Olczak – Junior; 20 – Austin Staley – Freshman; 25 – Karl Keglovits – Junior; 26 – Brad Stone – Junior; 27 – Chris Williams – (redshirt) Junior; 29 – Logan Beehler – Freshman; 33 – Johnny Piedmonte – (redshirt) Sophomore; 34 – Cody Beckman – Sophomore; 35 – Cory Wilder – Sophomore; 37 – Brian Brown – Freshman; 38 – Evan Mendoza – Freshman; 39 – Travis Orwig – (redshirt) Junior; 41 – Joe O'Donnell – Sophomore; 46 – Jordan Bissette – Freshman; 47 – Brian Donovan – Junior; 50 – Curt Britt – Junior; 51 – Will Gilbert – Junior	Catchers: 14 – Harris Yett – Freshman; 24 – Chance Shepard – Junior; 31 – Luke Voiron – (redshirt) Junior; 32 – Scott Manea – Freshman; Infielders: 5 – Joel McKeithan – Senior; 6 – Logan Ratledge – Senior; 7 – Nick Owens – Freshman; 8 – Ryne Willard – Junior; 10 – Joe Dunard – Freshman; 11 – Andrew Knizner – Sophomore; 16 – Shane Shepard – Freshman; 19 – Stephen Pitarra – Freshman; 23 – Jake Armstrong – Senior; 28 – Josh McLain – Freshman; 42 – Tommy DeJuneas – Freshman	Outfielders: 1 – Storm Edwards – Freshman; 2 – Bubby Riley – Senior; 13 – Brock Deatherage – Freshman; 15 – Garrett Suggs – Sophomore; 30 – Jake Fincher – Senior

=== Coaching staff ===
Name	Position	Seasons at NC State	Alma mater
Elliott Avent	Head coach	19	North Carolina State University
Chris Hart	Assistant Coach	9	Florida State University (2003)
Scott Foxhall	Assistant Coach	1	College of Charleston (1994)

== Season ==
=== February ===
The Wolfpack opened the season on February 13 with a game against Villanova, as part of a three-day tournament at home at Doak Field. However, the games on February 15 were cancelled due to impending weather, including NC State's game with Appalachian State. Against Villanova, the Wolfpack jumped out to a 10–0 lead after two innings, 13–0 lead after six, and eventually went on to win by a score of 14–5. In the second game of the weekend, the Wolfpack faced Davidson. Preston Palmiero went 5-for-5 from the plate and the Wolfpack defeated the Wildcats, 8–3. The Wolfpack had a game scheduled for February 17 against UNC Wilmington, but it was cancelled due to impending weather.

== Schedule ==
Legend
	NC State win
	NC State loss
	Postponement
**Bold**	NC State team member

2015 NC State Wolfpack baseball game log
Regular season
February

Date	Opponent	Rank	Site/stadium	Score	Win	Loss	Save	Attendance	Overall record	ACC Record
February 13	Villanova		Doak Field • Raleigh, NC	14–5	**Wilder** (1–0)	Harris (0–1)		773	1–0	–
February 14	Davidson		Doak Field • Raleigh, NC	8–3	**Mendoza** (1–0)	Bain (0–1)		1,223	2–0	–
February 15	Appalachian State		Doak Field • Raleigh, NC	Cancelled						
February 17	UNC Wilmington		Doak Field • Raleigh, NC	Cancelled						
February 20	vs. Albany		TicketReturn.com Field • Myrtle Beach, SC	Postponed Rescheduled for February 21						
February 21	vs. Albany		TicketReturn.com Field • Myrtle Beach, SC	6–9	Ryan (1–0)	**Wilder** (1–1)	DeCelle (1)	247	2–1	–
February 21	vs. FIU		TicketReturn.com Field • Myrtle Beach, SC	3–1	**Brown** (1–0)	Mourelle (1–1)	**DeJuneas** (1)	82	3–1	–
February 22	at Coastal Carolina		Springs Brooks Stadium • Conway, SC	3–12	Hopeck (1–0)	**Mendoza** (1–1)		1,454	3–2	–
February 24	North Carolina A&T		Doak Field • Raleigh, NC	Postponed Rescheduled for February 25						
February 25	North Carolina A&T		Doak Field • Raleigh, NC	9–1	**Stone** (1–0)	Miranda (0–1)		225	4–2	–
February 27	vs. Charlotte		Grayson Stadium • Savannah, GA	0–1	Geoghegan (1–0)	**Wilder** (1–2)	Sherer (2)	26	4–3	–
February 28	vs. UNC Greensboro		Grayson Stadium • Savannah, GA	4–2	**Brown** (2–0)	James (0–2)	**Olczak** (1)	41	5–3	–

March

Date	Opponent	Rank	Site/stadium	Score	Win	Loss	Save	Attendance	Overall record	ACC Record
March 1	vs. UNC Greensboro		Grayson Stadium • Savannah, GA	Cancelled						
March 1	vs. Charlotte		Grayson Stadium • Savannah, GA	Cancelled						
March 3	East Carolina		Doak Field • Raleigh, NC	7–0	**Britt** (1–0)	Boyd (1–2)		456	6–3	–
March 4	Appalachian State		Doak Field • Raleigh, NC	6–4	**DeJuneas** (1–0)	DeVrieze (1–2)		971	7–3	–
March 6	Clemson		Doak Field • Raleigh, NC	4–6	Crownover (3–0)	**Wilder** (1–3)	Moyer (2)	496	7–4	0–1
March 7	Clemson		Doak Field • Raleigh, NC	8–3	**Britt** (2–0)	Erwin (1–2)		1,508	8–4	1–1
March 8	Clemson		Doak Field • Raleigh, NC	14–6	**Piedmonte** (1–0)	Koerner (2–2)		1,745	9–4	2–1
March 11	at #29 Florida Atlantic		FAU Baseball Stadium • Boca Raton, FL	9–5	**Olczak** (1–0)	Monkman (3–1)		607	10–4	–
March 13	at #25 Miami (FL)		Alex Rodriguez Park at Mark Light Field • Coral Gables, FL	2–3 ^{(10)}	Garcia (2–1)	**DeJuneas** (1–1)		2,420	10–5	2–2
March 14	at #25 Miami (FL)		Alex Rodriguez Park • Coral Gables, FL	2–9	Sosa (3–1)	**Brown** (2–1)		2,836	10–6	2–3
March 15	at #25 Miami (FL)		Alex Rodriguez Park • Coral Gables, FL	0–6	Suarez (1–0)	**Piedmonte** (2–1)		2,502	10–7	2–4
March 17	at UNC Greensboro		UNCG Baseball Stadium • Greensboro, NC	3–7	Wantz (3–0)	**Williamson** (0–1)		977	10–8	–
March 18	UNC Greensboro		Doak Field • Raleigh, NC	8–3	**O'Donnell** (1–0)	Dulaney (0–2)		1,014	11–8	–
March 20	at Boston College		Pellagrini Diamond • Chestnut Hill, MA	1–3	Burke (1–3)	**Wilder** (1–4)	Dunn (1)	214	11–9	2–5
March 21	at Boston College		Pellagrini Diamond • Chestnut Hill, MA	9–4 ^{(15)}	**O'Donnell**(2–0)	Poore (0–2)		267	12–9	3–5
March 22	at Boston College		Pellagrini Diamond • Chestnut Hill, MA	Cancelled						
March 24	Elon		Doak Field • Raleigh, NC	14–0	**Williamson** (1–1)	Stalzer (1–4)		884	13–9	–
March 25	North Carolina A&T		Doak Field • Raleigh, NC	16–5	**Orwig** (1–0)	Garrett (0–1)		982	14–9	–
March 27	Pittsburgh		Doak Field • Raleigh, NC	14–5	**Wilder** (2–4)	Zeuch (2–3)	**Braband** (1)	431	15–9	4–5
March 28	Pittsburgh		Doak Field • Raleigh, NC	7–1	**Brown** (3–1)	Sandefur (1–3)	**DeJuneas** (2)	923	16–9	5–5
March 29	Pittsburgh		Doak Field • Raleigh, NC	9–2	**O'Donnell**(3–0)	Berube (0–3)		1,134	17–9	6–5
March 31	vs. Charlotte		BB&T Ballpark • Charlotte, NC	10–6	**Williamson** (2–1)	Horkey (1–2)	**DeJuneas** (3)	8,147	18–9	–

April

Date	Opponent	Rank	Site/stadium	Score	Win	Loss	Save	Attendance	Overall record	ACC Record
April 2	#8 Florida State		Doak Field • Raleigh, NC	2–3	Byrd (4–0)	**O'Donnell**(3–1)	Strode (9)	1,528	18–10	6–6
April 3	#8 Florida State		Doak Field • Raleigh, NC	0–1	Carlton (2–1)	**Brown** (3–2)	Strode (10)	2,201	18–11	6–7
April 4	#8 Florida State		Doak Field • Raleigh, NC	11–7	**O'Donnell**(4–1)	Johnson (3–2)	**Gilbert** (1)	1,838	19–11	7–7
April 7	at Elon		Walter C. Latham Park • Elon, NC	5–7	McGillicuddy (1–2)	**Gilbert** (0–1)		525	19–12	–
April 8	at UNC Wilmington		Brooks Field • Wilmington, NC	Cancelled						
April 10	at North Carolina		Boshamer Stadium • Chapel Hill, NC	1–2	Gallen (2–2)	**O'Donnell**(4–2)		3,942	19–13	7–8
April 11	at North Carolina		Boshamer Stadium • Chapel Hill, NC	2–3 ^{(10)}	Kelley (3–1)	**DeJuneas** (1–2)		4,142	19–14	7–9
April 12	at North Carolina		Boshamer Stadium • Chapel Hill, NC	6–3	**Williamson** (3–1)	Thornton (1–4)	**Gilbert** (2)	3,835	20–14	8–9
April 15	Charlotte		Doak Field • Raleigh, NC	Cancelled						
April 17	at Notre Dame		Frank Eck Stadium • Notre Dame, IN	0–2	Smoyer (6–0)	**Wilder** (2–5)	Guenther (4)	555	20–15	8–10
April 18	at Notre Dame		Frank Eck Stadium • Notre Dame, IN	4–2^{(14)}	**O'Donnell** (5–2)	Ruibal (0–1)			21–15	9–10
April 18	at Notre Dame		Frank Eck Stadium • Notre Dame, IN	2–7	McCarty (3–2)	**Williamson** (3–2)		1,230	21–16	9–11
April 21	at East Carolina		Clark–LeClair Stadium • Greenville, NC	5–6	Voliva (2–0)	**O'Donnell** (5–3)		3,821	21–17	–
April 24	Virginia		Doak Field • Raleigh, NC	3–8	Jones (5–2)	**Brown** (3–3)		1,759	21–18	9–12
April 25	Virginia		Doak Field • Raleigh, NC	Postponed Rescheduled for April 26 (doubleheader)						
April 26 (game 1)	Virginia		Doak Field • Raleigh, NC	4–3	**Gilbert** (1–1)	Doyle (1–1)		937	22–18	10–12
April 26 (game 2)	Virginia		Doak Field • Raleigh, NC	5–3^{(10)}	**DeJuneas** (2–2)	Bettinger (3–2)		1,113	23–18	11–12

May

Date	Opponent	Rank	Site/stadium	Score	Win	Loss	Save	Attendance	Overall record	ACC Record
May 1	Longwood		Doak Field • Raleigh, NC	Postponed Rescheduled for May 2 (doubleheader)						
May 2 ^{(game 1)}	Longwood		Doak Field • Raleigh, NC	3–2	**O'Donnell** (6–3)	Jones (2–1)		880	24–18	–
May 2 ^{(game 2)}	Longwood		Doak Field • Raleigh, NC	6–1	**Brown** (4–3)	Simpson (3–2)	**Britt** (1)	1,376	25–18	–
May 3	Longwood		Doak Field • Raleigh, NC	6–3	**Gilbert** (2–1)	Vick (2–6)	**DeJuneas** (4)	1,206	26–18	–
May 5	Campbell		Doak Field • Raleigh, NC	9–5	**Olczak** (2–0)	Meyer (0–1)		2,204	27–18	–
May 8	at Wake Forest		Wake Forest Baseball Park • Winston Salem, NC	19–1	**Brown** (5–3)	Pirro (6–4)	**Orwig** (1)	1,263	28–18	12–12
May 9	at Wake Forest		Wake Forest Baseball Park • Winston-Salem, NC	3–2	**Gilbert** (3–1)	Dunshee (5–3)	**DeJuneas** (5)	1,411	29–18	13–12
May 11	at Wake Forest		Wake Forest Baseball Park • Winston-Salem, NC	9–6	**O'Donnell** (7–3)	Johnstone (2–4)	**Orwig** (2)	819	30–18	14–12
May 14	Louisville		Doak Field • Raleigh, NC	3–4	Funkhouser (7–3)	**Williamson** (3–3)	Burdi (8)	2,252	30–19	14–13
May 15	Louisville		Doak Field • Raleigh, NC	3–2	**Brown** (6–3)	McKay (8–2)	**DeJuneas** (6)	1,987	31–19	15–13
May 16	Louisville		Doak Field • Raleigh, NC	5–8	Burdi (5–0)	**DeJuneas** (2–3)		1,591	31–20	15–14

Postseason
ACC Tournament

#	Date	Opponent	Rank	Site/stadium	Score	Win	Loss	Save	Attendance	Overall record	Tourn. Record
1	May 21	Notre Dame		Durham Bulls Athletic Park • Durham, NC	3–0	**Brown** (7–3)	Kerrigan (3–5)	**Britt** (2)	3,599	32–20	1–0
2	May 22	Miami		Durham Bulls Athletic Park • Durham, NC	5–4 ^{(12)}	**DeJuneas** (3–3)	Mediavilla (3–2)		6,806	33–20	2–0
3	May 23	Virginia		Durham Bulls Athletic Park • Durham, NC	10–2	**Williamson** (4–3)	Bettinger (4–5)		7,139	34–20	3–0
4	May 24	Florida State		Durham Bulls Athletic Park • Durham, NC	2–6	Biegalski (7–4)	**Piedmonte** (1–1)		9,759	34–21	3–1

NCAA Regional

#	Date	Opponent	Rank	Site/stadium	Score	Win	Loss	Save	Attendance	Overall record	Tourn. Record
1	May 29	Stony Brook		Lupton Stadium • Fort Worth, TX	3–0	**Britt** (3–0)	Zamora (7–3)	**Gilbert** (3)	2,785	35–21	1–0
2	May 30	at TCU		Lupton Stadium • Fort Worth, TX	5–4	**Orwig** (2–0)	Ferrell (1–3)		4,009	36–21	2–0
3	May 31	TCU		Lupton Stadium • Fort Worth, TX	2–8	Alexander (6–2)	**Williamson** (4–4)		3,480	36–22	2–1
4	June 1	at TCU		Lupton Stadium • Fort Worth, TX	8–9 ^{(10)}	Trieglaff (3–0)	**Britt** (3–1)		4,277	36–23	2–2

All rankings from Collegiate Baseball.

== Awards and honors ==
Andrew Knizner
- Perfect Game USA Pre-season First Team All-American
- 2015 All-ACC Baseball Second Team
Preston Palmeiro
- 2015 All-ACC Baseball Second Team
Jake Fincher
- 2015 All-ACC Baseball Second Team
Logan Ratledge
- 2015 All-ACC Baseball Third Team
Brian Brown
- 2015 ACC Baseball All-Freshman Team
