= 2015 Florida State Seminoles baseball team =

American college baseball season

2015 Florida State Seminoles baseball

ACC Tournament champion

Tallahassee Regional Gainesville Super Regional
- Conference: Atlantic Coast Conference
- Atlantic Division

Ranking
- Coaches: No. 13
- CB: No. 12
- Record: 44–21 (17–13 ACC)
- Head coach: Mike Martin (36th season)
- Assistant coach: Mike Martin, Jr. (18th season)
- Pitching coach: Mike Bell (4th season)
- Home stadium: Mike Martin Field at Dick Howser Stadium (Capacity: 6,700)

2015 Atlantic Coast Conference baseball standings
| | Conf. | | | | Overall |
| Team | W | | L | PCT | W | | L | PCT |
|---|---|---|---|---|---|---|---|---|
Atlantic
| No. 10 Louisville ^{x}‍‍‍^{y} | 25 | – | 5 | .833 | 47 | – | 18 | .723 |
| No. 26 Notre Dame ‍‍‍^{y} | 17 | – | 13 | .567 | 37 | – | 23 | .617 |
| No. 12 Florida State ‍‍‡‍^{y} | 17 | – | 13 | .567 | 44 | – | 21 | .677 |
| Clemson ‍‍‍^{y} | 16 | – | 13 | .552 | 32 | – | 29 | .525 |
| NC State ‍‍‍^{y} | 15 | – | 14 | .517 | 36 | – | 23 | .610 |
| Wake Forest ‍‍‍ | 12 | – | 18 | .400 | 27 | – | 26 | .509 |
| Boston College ‍‍‍ | 10 | – | 19 | .345 | 27 | – | 27 | .500 |
Coastal
| No. 6 Miami (FL) ^{x}‍‍‍^{y} | 22 | – | 8 | .733 | 50 | – | 16 | .758 |
| No. 1 Virginia ‍‍‍^{y} | 15 | – | 15 | .500 | 44 | – | 24 | .647 |
| North Carolina ‍‍‍ | 13 | – | 16 | .448 | 34 | – | 24 | .586 |
| Virginia Tech ‍‍‍ | 13 | – | 16 | .448 | 27 | – | 27 | .500 |
| Georgia Tech ‍‍‍ | 13 | – | 17 | .433 | 32 | – | 23 | .582 |
| Duke ‍‍‍ | 10 | – | 19 | .345 | 31 | – | 22 | .585 |
| Pittsburgh ‍‍‍ | 9 | – | 21 | .300 | 20 | – | 32 | .385 |
x – Division champion ‡ – Tournament champion y – Invited to the NCAA tournament As of June 30, 2015; Rankings from Collegiate Baseball

The 2015 Florida State Seminoles baseball team represented Florida State University during the 2015 NCAA Division I baseball season. The Seminoles played their home games at Mike Martin Field at Dick Howser Stadium as a member of the Atlantic Coast Conference. They were led by head coach Mike Martin, in his 36th season at Florida State. It was the Seminoles' 24th season as a member of the ACC and its 10th in the ACC's Atlantic Division.

Despite having a young team, Florida State won the ACC title and reached forty wins for the thirty-eighth straight year. The Seminoles were selected to host a regional in the NCAA tournament, marking their fifty-third tournament appearance and hosting for the thirty-second time, advancing to the super regionals for the fourteenth time.

== Previous season ==
In 2014, the Seminoles finished the season as Atlantic division champions with a record of 43–17, 21–9 in conference play. They qualified for the ACC tournament and were eliminated in pool play. The Seminoles qualified for the NCAA tournament as the #5 overall national seed. They were hosts of the Tallahassee regional, which also contained Georgia Southern, Alabama, and Kennesaw State. Florida State was upset by both Georgia Southern and Alabama and was eliminated after just two games.

== Personnel ==
=== Roster ===
2015 Florida State Seminoles roster
| Pitchers: 5 - Billy Strode - Senior; 6 - Cobi Johnson - Freshman; 7 - Steven Wells - Freshman; 8 - Christian Gonzalez-Santos - Freshman; 9 - Andy Ward - (redshirt) Freshman; 16 - Taylor Blatch - Sophomore; 17 - Mike Compton - (redshirt) Junior; 18 - Ed Voyles - (redshirt) Freshman; 19 - Andrew Karp - Freshman; 24 - Dylan Silva - Junior; 26 - Taylor Folsom - Freshman; 27 - Derek Vail - Junior; 30 - Will Zirzow - (redshirt) Freshman; 31 - Alec Byrd - Sophomore; 33 - Bryant Holtmann - Senior; 36 - Boomer Biegalski - Sophomore; 38 - Alex Deise - (redshirt) Sophomore; 42 - Jim Voyles - Sophomore; 46 - Drew Carlton - Freshman | Catchers: 13 - Danny De La Calle - Senior; 20 - Gage West - Sophomore; 25 - Bret Maxwell - Freshman; Infielders: 3 - Darren Miller - Freshman; 10 - Taylor Walls - Freshman; 12 - John Sansone - Junior; 14 - Jackson Owens - Freshman; 15 - Hank Truluck - Sophomore; 21 - Ben DeLuzio - Sophomore; 23 - Chris Marconcini - Senior; 28 - Dylan Busby - Freshman; 29 - Quincy Nieporte - Sophomore; 32 - Hayden Kelly - Junior | Outfielders: 1 - Nick Graganella - (redshirt) Junior; 2 - Josh Delph - Senior; 8 - D. J. Stewart - Junior; 43 - Timmy Delph - Freshman |

=== Coaching staff ===
2015 Florida State Seminoles baseball coaching staff
- 11 - Mike Martin – Head coach – 36th season
- 22 - Mike Bell - Associate head coach / Pitchers - 4th season
- 4 - Mike Martin, Jr. - Assistant coach/recruiting coordinator - 18th season

== Season ==
=== Preseason ===
In the ACC Media Poll, Florida State was picked by the coaches to finish second in the conference and first in the Atlantic Division.

== Schedule ==
Florida State was selected to be a regional host in the NCAA tournament as the thirteenth overall seed.

2015 Florida State Seminoles baseball game log
Regular season
February

| Date | Opponent | Rank | Site/stadium | Score | Win | Loss | Save | Attendance | Overall record | ACC record |
|---|---|---|---|---|---|---|---|---|---|---|
| February 13 | Oakland | #11 | Dick Howser Stadium • Tallahassee, FL | **W** 7–3 | **Holtmann** (1–0) | Scocchia (0–1) | | 4,712 | 1–0 | – |
| February 14 | Oakland | #11 | Dick Howser Stadium • Tallahassee, FL | **W** 15–2 | **Biegalski** (1–0) | Gee (0–1) | | 5,431 | 2–0 | – |
| February 15 | Oakland | #11 | Dick Howser Stadium • Tallahassee, FL | **W** 5–1 | **Johnson** (1–0) | Morton (0–1) | | 4,254 | 3–0 | – |
| February 18 | at Jacksonville | #11 | John Sessions Stadium • Jacksonville, FL | **L** 3–5 | Tanner (1–0) | **Holtmann** (1–1) | Disch (1) | 1,878 | 3–1 | – |
| February 20 | at Georgia | #11 | Foley Field • Athens, GA | **W** 7–5 | **Folsom** (1–0) | McLaughlin (0–1) | **Strode** (1) | 1,821 | 4–1 | – |
| February 21 | at Georgia | #11 | Foley Field • Athens, GA | **L** 1–4 | Lawlor (2–0) | **Biegalski** (1–1) | Cheek (1) | 2,826 | 4–2 | – |
| February 21 | at Georgia | #11 | Foley Field • Athens, GA | **L** 5–10 | Sosebee (2–0) | **Johnson** (1–1) | | 2,826 | 4–3 | – |
| February 24 | Jacksonville | #22 | Dick Howser Stadium • Tallahassee, FL | **W** 10–7 | **Silva** (1–0) | Baker (0–2) | **Strode** (2) | 3,669 | 5–3 | – |
| February 27 | UNC Wilmington | #22 | Dick Howser Stadium • Tallahassee, FL | **W** 4–3 | **Byrd** (1–0) | Magestro (1–1) | **Strode** (3) | 4,155 | 6–3 | – |
| February 28 | UNC Wilmington | #22 | Dick Howser Stadium • Tallahassee, FL | **W** 5–3 | **Silva** (2–0) | Ramsey (0–1) | **Strode** (4) | 3,949 | 7–3 | – |

March

| Date | Opponent | Rank | Site/stadium | Score | Win | Loss | Save | Attendance | Overall record | ACC record |
|---|---|---|---|---|---|---|---|---|---|---|
| March 1 | UNC Wilmington | #22 | Dick Howser Stadium • Tallahassee, FL | **W** 9–8 | **Folsom** (2–0) | Gantz (1–1) | **Strode** (5) | 3,904 | 8–3 | – |
| March 3 | South Florida | #22 | Dick Howser Stadium • Tallahassee, FL | **W** 24–1 | **Carlton** (1–0) | Lawson (0–1) | | 3,944 | 9–3 | – |
| March 4 | South Florida | #22 | Dick Howser Stadium • Tallahassee, FL | **W** 7–3 | **Byrd** (2–0) | Eveld (0–1) | **Folsom** (1) | 3,900 | 10–3 | – |
| March 6 | Boston College | #22 | Dick Howser Stadium • Tallahassee, FL | **W** 7–0 | **Compton** (1–0) | Burke (0–3) | | 3,777 | 11–3 | 1–0 |
| March 7 | Boston College | #22 | Dick Howser Stadium • Tallahassee, FL | **W** 3–2 | **Holtmann** (2–1) | King (0–1) | **Strode** (6) | 4,448 | 12–3 | 2–0 |
| March 8 | Boston College | #22 | Dick Howser Stadium • Tallahassee, FL | **W** 8–4 | **Johnson** (2–1) | Dunn (2–1) | | 4,207 | 13–3 | 3–0 |
| March 10 | #9 UCF | #11 | Dick Howser Stadium • Tallahassee, FL | **W** 11–8 | **Byrd** (3–0) | Marsh (0–1) | **Strode** (7) | 3,980 | 14–3 | – |
| March 11 | #9 UCF | #11 | Dick Howser Stadium • Tallahassee, FL | **W** 15–11 | **Deise** (1–0) | Thompson (0–2) | | 3,728 | 15–3 | – |
| March 13 | Wake Forest | #11 | Dick Howser Stadium • Tallahassee, FL | **L** 1–4 | Pirro (5–0) | **Voyles** (0–1) | Dunshee (1) | 3,870 | 15–4 | 3–1 |
| March 14 | Wake Forest | #11 | Dick Howser Stadium • Tallahassee, FL | **W** 12–2 | **Biegalski** (2–1) | Johnstone (1–1) | | 4,286 | 16–4 | 4–1 |
| March 15 | Wake Forest | #11 | Dick Howser Stadium • Tallahassee, FL | **W** 9–6 | **Holtmann** (3–1) | Kirkpatrick (2–1) | | 4,151 | 17–4 | 5–1 |
| March 17 | at #4 Florida | #7 | Alfred A. McKethan Stadium • Gainesville, FL | **L** 8–14 | Vinson (2–0) | **Carlton** (1–1) | | 5,827 | 17–5 | – |
| March 20 | at #12 Virginia | #7 | Davenport Field • Charlottesville, VA | **L** 4–8 | Doherty (1–0) | **Silva** (2–1) | Sborz (5) | 3,200 | 17–6 | 5–2 |
| March 21 | at #12 Virginia | #7 | Davenport Field • Charlottesville, VA | **W** 12–10 | **Silva** (3–1) | Sborz (1–2) | | 4,196 | 18–6 | 6–2 |
| March 22 | at #12 Virginia | #7 | Davenport Field • Charlottesville, VA | **W** 13–1 | **Johnson** (3–1) | Waddell (1–1) | | 3,994 | 19–6 | 7–2 |
| March 25 | Alabama State | #7 | Dick Howser Stadium • Tallahassee, FL | **W** 8–7 | **Silva** (4–1) | Pantoja (0–2) | **Strode** (8) | 4,116 | 20–6 | – |
| March 27 | Virginia Tech | #7 | Dick Howser Stadium • Tallahassee, FL | **L** 3–8 | Keselica (4–1) | **Biegalski** (2–2) | | 4,253 | 20–7 | 7–3 |
| March 28 | Virginia Tech | #7 | Dick Howser Stadium • Tallahassee, FL | **W** 19–9 | **Silva** (5–1) | McGarity (2–3) | | 6,348 | 21–7 | 8–3 |
| March 29 | Virginia Tech | #7 | Dick Howser Stadium • Tallahassee, FL | **W** 6–5 | **Strode** (1–0) | Scherzer (1–2) | | 4,358 | 22–7 | 9–3 |
| March 31 | vs. #6 Florida | #8 | Baseball Grounds • Jacksonville, FL | **W** 8–3 | **Holtmann** (4–1) | Faedo (1–1) | **Silva** (1) | 8,306 | 23–7 | – |

April

| Date | Opponent | Rank | Site/stadium | Score | Win | Loss | Save | Attendance | Overall record | ACC record |
|---|---|---|---|---|---|---|---|---|---|---|
| April 2 | at NC State | #8 | Doak Field • Raleigh, NC | **W** 3–2 | **Byrd** (4–0) | O'Donnell (1–1) | **Strode** (9) | 1,528 | 24–7 | 10–3 |
| April 3 | at NC State | #8 | Doak Field • Raleigh, NC | **W** 1–0 | **Carlton** (2–1) | Brown (3–2) | **Strode** (10) | 2,201 | 25–7 | 11–3 |
| April 4 | at NC State | #8 | Doak Field • Raleigh, NC | **L** 7–11 | O'Donnell (4–1) | **Johnson** (3–2) | Gilbert (1) | 1,838 | 25–8 | 11–4 |
| April 7 | Florida Gulf Coast | #7 | Dick Howser Stadium • Tallahassee, FL | **W** 5–0 | **Holtmann** (5–1) | Smeltzer (1–3) | | 4,032 | 26–8 | – |
| April 8 | Florida Gulf Coast | #7 | Dick Howser Stadium • Tallahassee, FL | **L** 0–5 | Deckert (1–0) | **Voyles** (0–1) | | 3,815 | 26–9 | – |
| April 10 | at Notre Dame | #7 | Frank Eck Stadium • Notre Dame, IN | **L** 2–5 | Smoyer (5–0) | **Biegalski** (2–3) | Guenther (2) | 522 | 26–10 | 11–5 |
| April 11 | at Notre Dame | #7 | Frank Eck Stadium • Notre Dame, IN | **L** 1–4 | Bielak (4–1) | **Carlton** (2–2) | Guenther (3) | 1,109 | 26–11 | 11–6 |
| April 12 | at Notre Dame | #7 | Frank Eck Stadium • Notre Dame, IN | **L** 1–2 | Hale (1–0) | **Compton** (1–1) | Tully (1) | 896 | 26–12 | 11–7 |
| April 14 | #12 Florida | #9 | Dick Howser Stadium • Tallahassee, FL | **W** 4–3^{12} | **Strode** (2–0) | Rubio (0–1) | | 6,634 | 27–12 | – |
| April 17 | Pittsburgh | #9 | Dick Howser Stadium • Tallahassee, FL | **W** 15–2 | **Biegalski** (3–3) | Zeuch (3–5) | | 3,986 | 28–12 | 12–7 |
| April 18 | Pittsburgh | #9 | Dick Howser Stadium • Tallahassee, FL | **W** 6–5 | **Byrd** (5–0) | Mitchell (0–2) | **Stode** (11) | 5,296 | 29–12 | 13–7 |
| April 18 | Pittsburgh | #9 | Dick Howser Stadium • Tallahassee, FL | **W** 10–6 | **Carlton** (3–2) | Berube (1–5) | | 5,296 | 30–12 | 14–7 |
| April 21 | Stetson | #8 | Dick Howser Stadium • Tallahassee, FL | **W** 6–1 | **Silva** (6–1) | Thorne (3–1) | | 4,079 | 31–12 | – |
| April 24 | at #6 Miami (FL) | #8 | Alex Rodriguez Park at Mark Light Field • Coral Gables, FL | **W** 8–7^{17} | **Zirzow** (1–0) | Beauprez (1–2) | | 4,189 | 32–12 | 15–7 |
| April 25 | at #6 Miami (FL) | #8 | Alex Rodriguez Park • Coral Gables, FL | **W** 15–5 | **Compton** (2–1) | Suarez (4–1) | | 4,650 | 33–12 | 16–7 |
| April 26 | at #6 Miami (FL) | #8 | Alex Rodriguez Park • Coral Gables, FL | **L** 0–12 | Sosa (6–3) | **Carlton** (3–3) | | 3,289 | 33–13 | 16–8 |

May

| Date | Opponent | Rank | Site/stadium | Score | Win | Loss | Save | Attendance | Overall record | ACC record |
|---|---|---|---|---|---|---|---|---|---|---|
| May 1 | Coastal Carolina | #7 | Dick Howser Stadium • Tallahassee, FL | **W** 16–2 | **Biegalski** (4–3) | Morrison (2–2) | | 3,979 | 34–13 | – |
| May 2 | Coastal Carolina | #7 | Dick Howser Stadium • Tallahassee, FL | **W** 8–3 | **Compton** (3–1) | Kerr (8–1) | | 4,211 | 35–13 | – |
| May 3 | Coastal Carolina | #7 | Dick Howser Stadium • Tallahassee, FL | **L** 2–4 | Holmes (4–0) | **Carlton** (3–4) | | 3,978 | 35–14 | – |
| May 5 | at Stetson | #7 | Melching Field • DeLand, FL | **W** 3–1 | **Holtmann** (6–1) | Fagan (1–1) | **Strode** (12) | 1,874 | 36–14 | – |
| May 8 | at #4 Louisville | #7 | Jim Patterson Stadium • Louisville, KY | **W** 13–4 | **Biegalski** (5–3) | Funkhouser (6–4) | | 6,138 | 37–14 | 17–8 |
| May 9 | at #4 Louisville | #7 | Jim Patterson Stadium • Louisville, KY | **L** 0–7 | McKay (8–1) | **Compton** (3–2) | | 3,054 | 37–15 | 17–9 |
| May 10 | at #4 Louisville | #7 | Jim Patterson Stadium • Louisville, KY | **L**5–6 | Burdi (4–0) | **Byrd** (5–1) | | 3,302 | 37–16 | 17–10 |
| May 14 | Clemson | #8 | Dick Howser Stadium • Tallahassee, FL | **L** 1–4 | Crownover (10–1) | **Biegalski** (5–4) | Krall (3) | 4,082 | 37–17 | 17–11 |
| May 15 | Clemson | #8 | Dick Howser Stadium • Tallahassee, FL | **L** 0–7 | Erwin (6–4) | **Compton** (3–3) | Vetzel (4) | 4,492 | 37–18 | 17–12 |
| May 16 | Clemson | #8 | Dick Howser Stadium • Tallahassee, FL | **L** 6–9 | Long (2–0) | **Carlton** (3–5) | | 4,541 | 37–19 | 17–13 |

Postseason
ACC Tournament

| Date | Opponent | Rank | Site/stadium | Score | Win | Loss | Save | Attendance | Overall record | ACCT record |
|---|---|---|---|---|---|---|---|---|---|---|
| May 20 | vs. #28 (5) Clemson | #10 (4) | Durham Bulls Athletic Park • Durham, NC (Pool A) | **W** 3–1 | **Biegalski** (6–4) | Crownover (10–2) | **Strode** (13) | 3,155 | 38–19 | 1–0 |
| May 21 | vs. (8) North Carolina | #10 (4) | Durham Bulls Athletic Park • Durham, NC (Pool A) | **W** 8–4 | **Compton** (4–3) | Thornton (3–7) | | 3,291 | 39–19 | 2–0 |
| May 23 | vs. #5 (1) Louisville | #10 (4) | Durham Bulls Athletic Park • Durham, NC (Pool A) | **W** 6–0 | **Carlton** (4–5) | McKay (8–3) | | 4,179 | 40–19 | 3–0 |
| May 24 | vs. (6) NC State | #10 (4) | Durham Bulls Athletic Park • Durham, NC (Championship) | **W** 6–2 | **Biegalski** (7–4) | Piedmonte (1–1) | | 9,759 | 41–19 | 4–0 |

NCAA tournament
Tallahassee Regional

| Date | Opponent | Rank | Site/stadium | Score | Win | Loss | Save | Attendance | Overall record | NCAAT record |
|---|---|---|---|---|---|---|---|---|---|---|
| May 29 | (4) Mercer | #10 (1) | Dick Howser Stadium • Tallahassee, FL | **W** 5–4^{10} | **Strode** (3–0) | Kourtis (3–2) | | 3,824 | 42–19 | 1–0 |
| May 30 | #25 (2) College of Charleston | #10 (1) | Dick Howser Stadium • Tallahassee, FL | **W** 3–2 | **Silva** (7–1) | Glazer (10–2) | **Strode** (14) | 3,562 | 43–19 | 2–0 |
| June 1 | #25 (2) College of Charleston | #10 (1) | Dick Howser Stadium • Tallahassee, FL | **W** 8–1 | **Carlton** (5–5) | McCutcheon (1–2) | | 3,037 | 44–19 | 3–0 |

Gainesville Super Regional

| Date | Opponent | Rank | Site/stadium | Score | Win | Loss | Save | Attendance | Overall record | NCAAT record |
|---|---|---|---|---|---|---|---|---|---|---|
| June 5 | at #6 (4) Florida | #9 (13) | Alfred A. McKethan Stadium • Gainesville, FL | **L** 5–13 | Shore (9–6) | **Biegalski** (7–5) | | 5,709 | 44–20 | 0–1 |
| June 6 | at #6 (4) Florida | #9 (13) | Alfred A. McKethan Stadium • Gainesville, FL | **L** 4–11 | Poyner (5–2) | **Compton** (4–4) | | 5,772 | 44–21 | 0–2 |

Legend: = Win = Loss = Postponement
Bold = Florida State team member
Rankings from Collegiate Baseball; parenthesis indicate tournament seedings.

== Rankings ==
Ranking movements Legend: ██ Increase in ranking ██ Decrease in ranking
| | Week | | | | | | | | | | | | | | | | | |
| Poll | Pre | 1 | 2 | 3 | 4 | 5 | 6 | 7 | 8 | 9 | 10 | 11 | 12 | 13 | 14 | 15 | 16 | Final |
|---|---|---|---|---|---|---|---|---|---|---|---|---|---|---|---|---|---|---|
| Coaches' | 12 | 12* | 16 | 19 | 18 | 11 | 9 | 8 | 8 | 13 | 11 | 11 | 10 | 8 | 14 | 10 | 10 | 13 |
| Baseball America | 21 | 21 | 25 | 21 | 18 | 13 | 10 | 10 | 8 | 13 | 12 | 9 | 8 | 9 | 17 | 10 | 10 | 15 |
| Collegiate Baseball^ | 11 | 11 | 22 | 22 | 11 | 7 | 7 | 8 | 7 | 9 | 8 | 7 | 7 | 8 | 10 | 10 | 9 | 12 |
| NCBWA† | 16 | 15 | 22 | 22 | 17 | 12 | 10 | 8 | 8 | 13 | 12 | 11 | 10 | 9 | 16 | 12 | 10 | 13 |

^ Collegiate Baseball ranked 40 teams in their preseason poll, but only ranked 30 teams weekly during the season.
† NCBWA ranks 30 teams in their preseason poll, but only ranks 25 teams weekly during the season.
* A new poll was not released for this week, so for comparison purposes, the previous week's ranking is inserted in this week's slot.

== Awards ==
D. J. Stewart

- Louisville Slugger Pre-season First Team All-American
- Perfect Game USA Pre-season First Team All-American
- Baseball America Pre-season First Team All-American
- D1Baseball.com Pre-season First Team All-American
- NCBWA Pre-season First Team All-American
- Golden Spikes Semifinalist

=== Watchlists ===
- Golden Spikes Award

D. J. Stewart

- NCBWA Stopper of the Year Award

Billy Strode

=== Honors ===
- ACC Player of the Week
  - D. J. Stewart
  - Chris Marconcini
- ACC Pitcher of the Week
  - Billy Strode
  - Boomer Biegalski
- NCBWA Hitter of the Week
  - D. J. Stewart
- National Player of the Week (Louisville Slugger/Collegiate Baseball)
  - D. J. Stewart
  - Chris Marconcini
  - Boomer Biegalski

==== All-ACC ====
Four players were named All-ACC selections.

- First Team
  - D. J. Stewart
- Second Team
  - Billy Strode
- Third Team
  - Quincy Nieporte
- Freshman Team
  - Dylan Busby

Ben Duluzio, Chris Marconcini and Boomer Biegalski were named to the All-Tournament team, with Boomer Biegalski being named tournament MVP.

==== All-Americans ====
- Dylan Busby
- D. J. Stewart
- Billy Strode

== MLB draft ==
Seven players were selected in the 2015 MLB draft:

| Round | Overall Pick | Name | Position | Team |
|---|---|---|---|---|
| 1st | 25 | D. J. Stewart | Outfielder | Baltimore Orioles |
| 9th | 268 | Danny De La Calle | Catcher | Tampa Bay Rays |
| 10th | 304 | Billy Strode | Pitcher | Cleveland Indians |
| 11th | 335 | Dylan Silva | Pitcher | Seattle Mariners |
| 14th | 428 | Boomer Biegalski | Pitcher | Oakland Athletics |
| 24th | 706 | Bryant Holtmann | Pitcher | Arizona Diamondbacks |
| 37th | 1,125 | Josh Delph | Outfielder | Los Angeles Angels of Anaheim |
