= 2015 Duke Blue Devils baseball team =

American college baseball season

2015 Duke Blue Devils baseball
- Conference: Atlantic Coast Conference
- Record: 0–0 (0–0 ACC)
- Head coach: Chris Pollard (3rd season)
- Assistant coaches: Josh Jordan (3rd season); Andrew See (3rd season)
- Home stadium: Jack Coombs Field

2015 Atlantic Coast Conference baseball standings
	Conf.				Overall
Team	W		L	PCT	W		L	PCT
Atlantic
No. 10 Louisville ^{x}‍‍‍^{y}	25	–	5	.833	47	–	18	.723
No. 26 Notre Dame ‍‍‍^{y}	17	–	13	.567	37	–	23	.617
No. 12 Florida State ‍‍‡‍^{y}	17	–	13	.567	44	–	21	.677
Clemson ‍‍‍^{y}	16	–	13	.552	32	–	29	.525
NC State ‍‍‍^{y}	15	–	14	.517	36	–	23	.610
Wake Forest ‍‍‍	12	–	18	.400	27	–	26	.509
Boston College ‍‍‍	10	–	19	.345	27	–	27	.500
Coastal
No. 6 Miami (FL) ^{x}‍‍‍^{y}	22	–	8	.733	50	–	16	.758
No. 1 Virginia ‍‍‍^{y}	15	–	15	.500	44	–	24	.647
North Carolina ‍‍‍	13	–	16	.448	34	–	24	.586
Virginia Tech ‍‍‍	13	–	16	.448	27	–	27	.500
Georgia Tech ‍‍‍	13	–	17	.433	32	–	23	.582
Duke ‍‍‍	10	–	19	.345	31	–	22	.585
Pittsburgh ‍‍‍	9	–	21	.300	20	–	32	.385
x – Division champion ‡ – Tournament champion y – Invited to the NCAA tournament As of June 30, 2015; Rankings from Collegiate Baseball

The 2015 Duke Blue Devils baseball team represented Duke University during the 2015 NCAA Division I baseball season. The Blue Devils played their home games at Jack Coombs Field (sometimes at Durham Bulls Athletic Park) as a member of the Atlantic Coast Conference. They were led by head coach Chris Pollard, in his third season at Duke.

== Previous season ==
In 2014, the Blue Devils finished the season 3rd in the ACC's Coastal Division with a record of 33–25, 16–14 in conference play. They qualified for the 2014 Atlantic Coast Conference baseball tournament, and were eliminated in pool play. They failed to qualify for the 2014 NCAA Division I baseball tournament.

== Personnel ==
=== Roster ===
2015 Duke Blue Devils roster
Pitchers: 9 - Remy Janco - (redshirt) Junior; 12 - James Marvel - (redshirt) Sophomore; 19 - Dillon Haviland - (redshirt) Senior; 20 - Trent Swart - Senior; 21 - Chris McGrath - Freshman; 24 - Karl Blum - Sophomore; 25 - Nick Hendrix - Junior; 26 - Andrew Istler - Senior; 30 - Michael Matuella - Junior; 34 - J.R. Holloway - Sophomore; 35 - Conner Stevens - (redshirt) Junior; 36 - Bailey Clark - Sophomore; 39 - James Ziemba - (redshirt) Freshman; 40 - Kevin Lewallyn - Sophomore; 47 - Mitch Stallings - Freshman; 53 - Luke Whitten - Freshman; 55 - Chris Koppenhaver - Freshman; 75 - Sarkis Ohanian - Senior	Catchers: 8 - Reed Anthes - Senior; 15 - Mike Rosenfeld - (redshirt) Senior; 18 - Cris Perez - Sophomore; Infielders: 1 - Daniel Calabretta - Freshman; 3 - Justin Bellinger - Freshman; 5 - Max Miller - Freshman; 6 - Jack Labosky - Freshman; 7 - Kenny Koplove - Junior; 10 - Peter Zyla - Freshman; 13 - Andy Perez - Senior; 22 - Jalen Phillips - (redshirt) Sophomore; 31 - Ryan Day - Freshman	Outfielders: 4 - James McGhee - Freshman; 16 - Michael Smiciklas - Freshman; 17 - Cameron Neal - (redshirt) Junior; 27 - Evan Dougherty - Freshman; 28 - Grant McCabe - Senior

=== Coaching staff ===
Name	Position	Seasons at Duke	Alma mater
Chris Pollard	Head coach	3	Davidson University (1996)
Josh Jordan	Assistant coach	3	Catawba College (2002)
Matt Hobbs	Assistant coach	3	Ohio University (2001)

== Schedule ==
Legend
	Duke win
	Duke loss
	Postponement
**Bold**	Duke team member

2015 Duke Blue Devils baseball game log
Regular season
February

#	Date	Opponent	Rank	Site/stadium	Score	Win	Loss	Save	Attendance	Overall record	ACC Record
1	February 13	at California		Evans Diamond • Berkeley, CA							
2	February 14	at California		Evans Diamond • Berkeley, CA							
3	February 15	at California		Evans Diamond • Berkeley, CA							
4	February 20	Hartford		Jack Coombs Field • Durham, NC							
5	February 21	Delaware State		Jack Coombs Field • Durham, NC							
6	February 22	Iona		Jack Coombs Field • Durham, NC							
7	February 24	at UNC Greensboro		UNCG Baseball Stadium • Greensboro, NC							
8	February 27	Rider		Jack Coombs Field • Durham, NC							
9	February 28	Rider		Jack Coombs Field • Durham, NC							

March

#	Date	Opponent	Rank	Site/stadium	Score	Win	Loss	Save	Attendance	Overall record	Tourn. Record
10	March 1	Rider		Jack Coombs Field • Durham, NC							
11	March 3	Liberty		Jack Coombs Field • Durham, NC							
12	March 6	at North Carolina		Boshamer Stadium • Chapel Hill, NC							
13	March 7	at North Carolina		Boshamer Stadium • Chapel Hill, NC							
14	March 8	at North Carolina		Boshamer Stadium • Chapel Hill, NC							
15	March 10	Yale		Jack Coombs Field • Durham, NC							
16	March 11	Bryant		Jack Coombs Field • Durham, NC							
17	March 13	Georgia Tech		Jack Coombs Field • Durham, NC							
18	March 14	Georgia Tech		Jack Coombs Field • Durham, NC							
19	March 15	Georgia Tech		Jack Coombs Field • Durham, NC							
20	March 17	Columbia		Durham Bulls Athletic Park • Durham, NC							
21	March 18	Columbia		Durham Bulls Athletic Park • Durham, NC							
22	March 20	Pittsburgh		Durham Bulls Athletic Park • Durham, NC							
23	March 21	Pittsburgh		Durham Bulls Athletic Park • Durham, NC							
24	March 22	Pittsburgh		Durham Bulls Athletic Park • Durham, NC							
25	March 24	at Liberty		Liberty Baseball Stadium • Lynchburg, VA							
26	March 27	at Boston College		Pellagrini Diamond • Chestnut Hill, MA							
27	March 28	at Boston College		Pellagrini Diamond • Chestnut Hill, MA							
28	March 29	at Boston College		Pellagrini Diamond • Chestnut Hill, MA							
29	March 31	Campbell		Jack Coombs Field • Durham, NC							

April

#	Date	Opponent	Rank	Site/stadium	Score	Win	Loss	Save	Attendance	Overall record	Tourn. Record
30	April 3	at Miami (FL)		Alex Rodriguez Park at Mark Light Field • Coral Gables, FL							
31	April 4	at Miami (FL)		Alex Rodriguez Park • Coral Gables, FL							
32	April 5	at Miami (FL)		Alex Rodriguez Park • Coral Gables, FL							
33	April 7	Davidson		Jack Coombs Field • Durham, NC							
34	April 8	Richmond		Durham Bulls Athletic Park • Durham, NC							
35	April 10	Louisville		Durham Bulls Athletic Park • Durham, NC							
36	April 11	Louisville		Durham Bulls Athletic Park • Durham, NC							
37	April 12	Louisville		Durham Bulls Athletic Park • Durham, NC							
38	April 14	UNC Greensboro		Jack Coombs Field • Durham, NC							
39	April 17	at Clemson		Doug Kingsmore Stadium • Clemson, SC							
40	April 18	at Clemson		Doug Kingsmore Stadium • Clemson, SC							
41	April 19	at Clemson		Doug Kingsmore Stadium • Clemson, SC							
42	April 22	at East Carolina		Clark–LeClair Stadium • Greenville, NC							
43	April 24	Virginia Tech		Jack Coombs Field • Durham, NC							
44	April 25	Virginia Tech		Durham Bulls Athletic Park • Durham, NC							
45	April 26	Virginia Tech		Jack Coombs Field • Durham, NC							

May

#	Date	Opponent	Rank	Site/stadium	Score	Win	Loss	Save	Attendance	Overall record	ACC Record
46	May 3	North Carolina Central		Jack Coombs Field • Durham, NC							
47	May 5	at Davidson		T. Henry Wilson, Jr. Field • Davidson, NC							
48	May 8	at Virginia		Davenport Field • Charlottesville, VA							
49	May 9	at Virginia		Davenport Field • Charlottesville, VA							
50	May 10	at Virginia		Davenport Field • Charlottesville, VA							
51	May 12	Longwood		Jack Coombs Field • Durham, NC							
52	May 14	Wake Forest		Jack Coombs Field • Durham, NC							
53	May 15	Wake Forest		Jack Coombs Field • Durham, NC							
54	May 16	Wake Forest		Jack Coombs Field • Durham, NC							

Postseason
ACC Tournament

#	Date	Opponent	Rank	Site/stadium	Score	Win	Loss	Save	Attendance	Overall record	Tourn. Record
	May 19	TBD		Durham Bulls Athletic Park • Durham, NC							

All rankings from Collegiate Baseball.

== Awards and honors ==
Michael Matuella

- Perfect Game USA Pre-season Third Team All-American
- Baseball America Pre-season First team All-American
