= 2015 Atlantic Coast Conference baseball tournament =

American college baseball tournament

- Format: Round-robin tournament
- Finals site: Durham Bulls Athletic Park; Durham, NC
- Champions: Florida State (6th title)
- Winning coach: Mike Martin (6th title)
- MVP: Boomer Biegalski (Florida State)
- Television: ACCRSN (round robin)/ ESPN2 (championship)

2015 Atlantic Coast Conference baseball standings
	Conf.				Overall
Team	W		L	PCT	W		L	PCT
Atlantic
No. 10 Louisville ^{x}‍‍‍^{y}	25	–	5	.833	47	–	18	.723
No. 26 Notre Dame ‍‍‍^{y}	17	–	13	.567	37	–	23	.617
No. 12 Florida State ‍‍‡‍^{y}	17	–	13	.567	44	–	21	.677
Clemson ‍‍‍^{y}	16	–	13	.552	32	–	29	.525
NC State ‍‍‍^{y}	15	–	14	.517	36	–	23	.610
Wake Forest ‍‍‍	12	–	18	.400	27	–	26	.509
Boston College ‍‍‍	10	–	19	.345	27	–	27	.500
Coastal
No. 6 Miami (FL) ^{x}‍‍‍^{y}	22	–	8	.733	50	–	16	.758
No. 1 Virginia ‍‍‍^{y}	15	–	15	.500	44	–	24	.647
North Carolina ‍‍‍	13	–	16	.448	34	–	24	.586
Virginia Tech ‍‍‍	13	–	16	.448	27	–	27	.500
Georgia Tech ‍‍‍	13	–	17	.433	32	–	23	.582
Duke ‍‍‍	10	–	19	.345	31	–	22	.585
Pittsburgh ‍‍‍	9	–	21	.300	20	–	32	.385
x – Division champion ‡ – Tournament champion y – Invited to the NCAA tournament As of June 30, 2015; Rankings from Collegiate Baseball

The 2015 Atlantic Coast Conference baseball tournament was held from May 19 through 24 at Durham Bulls Athletic Park in Durham, North Carolina. The annual tournament determines the conference champion of the Division I Atlantic Coast Conference for college baseball. Florida State won their sixth tournament championship and received the league's automatic bid to the 2015 NCAA Division I baseball tournament. This was the last of 19 athletic championship events held by the conference in the 2014–15 academic year.

The tournament has been held every year but one since 1973, with Clemson and Georgia Tech each winning nine championships, the most all-time. Charter league member Duke, along with recent entrants Virginia Tech, Boston College, Pittsburgh and Notre Dame have never won the event. In Louisville's first season in the ACC in 2015, Louisville had the best regular season record and secured the #1 seed in the conference tournament.

== Format and seeding ==
The winner of each seven team division and the top eight other teams based on conference winning percentage, regardless of division, from the conference's regular season were seeded one through ten. Seeds one and two were awarded to the two division winners. The bottom four seeds played an opening round, with the winners advancing to pool play. The winner of each pool played a single championship game.

Formats and seeding
Division	Team	W	L	Pct	GB	Seed
Atlantic	Louisville	25	5	.833	–	1
Atlantic	Notre Dame	17	13	.567	8	3
Atlantic	Florida State	17	13	.567	8	4
Atlantic	Clemson	16	13	.552	8.5	5
Atlantic	NC State	16	13	.552	8.5	6
Atlantic	Wake Forest	12	18	.400	13	–
Atlantic	Boston College	10	19	.345	14.5	–
Coastal	Miami (FL)	22	8	.733	–	2
Coastal	Virginia	15	15	.500	7	7
Coastal	North Carolina	13	16	.448	8.5	8
Coastal	Virginia Tech	13	16	.448	8.5	9
Coastal	Georgia Tech	13	17	.433	9	10
Coastal	Duke	10	19	.345	11.5	–
Coastal	Pittsburgh	9	21	.300	13	–

== Schedule and results ==
=== Play-In Round ===
Tuesday, May 19
Team	R
#10 Georgia Tech	0
#7 Virginia	11
Notes: 7 innings due to 10-run rule.

Tuesday, May 19
Team	R
#9 Virginia Tech	3
#8 North Carolina	5

=== Pool Play ===
	Division A	UL	FSU	CLEM	UNC	Overall
1	Louisville		L 0–6	L 2–7	W 7–4	1–2
4	Florida State	W 6–0		W 3–1	W 8–4	3–0
5	Clemson	W 7–2	L 1–3		L 3–6	1–2
8	North Carolina	L 4–7	L 4–8	W 6–3		1–2

	Division B	UM	ND	NCSU	UVA	Overall
2	Miami (FL)		W 6–5	L 4–5	W 9–5	2–1
3	Notre Dame	L 5–6		L 0–3	W 8–2	1–2
6	NC State	W 5–4	W 3–0		W 10–2	3–0
7	Virginia	L 5–9	L 2–8	L 2–10		0–3

Finals
A	Florida State	6
B	NC State	2

== Results ==
Tuesday, May 19 11:00 a.m.
Team	1	2	3	4	5	6	7	R	H	E
#10 Georgia Tech	0	0	0	0	0	0	0	0	1	2
#7 Virginia	1	0	4	3	3	0	X	11	13	0
WP: Josh Sborz (3–2) LP: Jonathan King (4–5); Home runs: GT: None; UVA: Daniel Pinero (6), Pavin Smith (6); Attendance: 2,614; Notes: UVA advances into Pool Play, GT is eliminated. Game Duration - 1:56; Boxscore

Tuesday, May 19 3:00 p.m.
Team	1	2	3	4	5	6	7	8	9	R	H	E
#9 Virginia Tech	0	1	0	0	0	0	1	1	0	3	10	2
#8 North Carolina	0	0	0	3	1	0	0	1	X	5	12	2
WP: Zac Gallen (4–3) LP: Kit Scheetz (3–4) Sv: Trevor Kelley (4); Attendance: 3,370; Notes: UNC advances into Pool Play, VT is eliminated. Game Duration - 3:01; Boxscore

Wednesday, May 20 11:00 a.m.
Team	1	2	3	4	5	6	7	8	9	R	H	E
#5 Clemson	0	0	0	0	0	0	0	1	0	1	6	0
#4 Florida State	0	0	3	0	0	0	0	0	X	3	3	2
WP: Boomer Biegalski (6–4) LP: Matthew Crownover (10–2) Sv: Billy Strode (13); Attendance: 3,155; Notes: Game Duration - 2:34; Boxscore

Wednesday, May 20 3:00 p.m.
Team	1	2	3	4	5	6	7	8	9	R	H	E
#7 Virginia	0	0	0	0	0	3	0	2	0	5	7	3
#2 Miami (FL)	1	0	0	0	1	0	0	7	X	9	7	2
WP: Bryan Garcia (5–2) LP: Alec Bettinger (4–4); Home runs: UVA: Kenny Towns (5); UM: Garrett Kennedy (7); Attendance: 2,774; Notes: Game Duration - 3:17; Boxscore

Wednesday, May 20 7:00 p.m.
Team	1	2	3	4	5	6	7	8	9	R	H	E
#8 North Carolina	1	0	3	0	0	0	0	0	0	4	7	1
#1 Louisville	0	0	0	2	1	4	0	0	X	7	9	0
WP: Lincoln Henzman (5–1) LP: Benton Moss (7–1) Sv: Zack Burdi (9); Home runs: UNC: Tyler Ramirez (10); UL: Brendan McKay (3); Attendance: 3,801; Notes: Game Duration - 3:16; Boxscore

Thursday, May 21 1:30 p.m.
Team	1	2	3	4	5	6	7	8	9	R	H	E
#6 NC State	2	1	0	0	0	0	0	0	0	3	9	1
#3 Notre Dame	0	0	0	0	0	0	0	0	0	0	3	1
WP: Brian Brown (7–3) LP: Scott Kerrigan (3–5) Sv: Curt Britt (2); Attendance: 3,599; Notes: Game Duration - 2:32; Boxscore

Thursday, May 21 4:30 p.m.
Team	1	2	3	4	5	6	7	8	9	R	H	E
#1 Louisville	0	1	0	0	0	0	0	0	1	2	7	2
#5 Clemson	3	2	0	0	2	0	0	0	X	7	10	2
WP: Zack Erwin (7–4) LP: Kyle Funkhouser (7–5); Attendance: 2,858; Notes: Game Duration - 2:54; Boxscore

Thursday, May 21 8:10 p.m.
Team	1	2	3	4	5	6	7	8	9	R	H	E
#4 Florida State	1	2	1	0	0	1	0	3	0	8	12	1
#8 North Carolina	0	0	0	0	0	2	0	0	2	4	8	1
WP: Mike Compton (4–3) LP: Trent Thronton (3–7); Attendance: 3,291; Notes: Game Duration - 3:16, CLEM and UNC eliminated from Championship contention Boxscore

Friday, May 22 11:00 a.m.
Team	1	2	3	4	5	6	7	8	9	R	H	E
#3 Notre Dame	1	0	2	1	0	2	0	1	1	8	8	0
#7 Virginia	0	0	2	0	0	0	0	0	0	2	6	2
WP: Ryan Smoyer (9–0) LP: Brandon Waddell (3–5) Sv: Brandon Bielak (1); Attendance: 2,916; Notes: Game Duration - 3:05, UVA eliminated from Championship contention Boxscore

Friday, May 22 3:10 p.m.
Team	1	2	3	4	5	6	7	8	9	R	H	E
#5 Clemson	0	0	0	0	0	2	0	1	0	3	9	4
#8 North Carolina	0	0	3	2	0	1	0	0	X	6	5	1
WP: J. B. Bukauskas (5–3) LP: Jake Long (2–1) Sv: Trevor Kelley (5); Home runs: CLEM: None; UNC: Skye Bolt (10); Attendance: 3,630; Notes: Game Duration - 3:13; Boxscore

Friday, May 22 7:15 p.m.
Team	1	2	3	4	5	6	7	8	9	10	11	12	R	H	E
#2 Miami (FL)	1	0	1	2	0	0	0	0	0	0	0	0	4	6	2
#6 NC State	0	0	2	0	0	1	0	0	1	0	0	1	5	8	1
WP: Tommy DeJuneas (3–3) LP: Michael Mediavilla (3–2); Home runs: UM: None; NCSU: Ryne Willard (4); Attendance: 6,806; Notes: Game Duration - 3:51, NCSU advances to Championship game, ND and UM eliminated from Championship contention Boxscore

Saturday, May 23 11:00 a.m.
Team	1	2	3	4	5	6	7	8	9	R	H	E
#1 Louisville	0	0	0	0	0	0	0	0	0	0	6	1
#4 Florida State	0	0	0	0	0	3	2	1	X	6	7	1
WP: Drew Carlton (4–5) LP: Brendan McKay (8–3); Home runs: UL: None; FSU: Ben DeLuzio (2); Attendance: 4,179; Notes: Game Duration - 2:50, FSU advances to Championship game, UL eliminated Boxscore

=== Championship ===
Sunday, May 24 1:00 p.m.
Team	1	2	3	4	5	6	7	8	9	R	H	E
#6 NC State	0	0	0	2	0	0	0	0	0	2	5	0
#4 Florida State	0	0	3	2	0	0	1	0	X	6	8	0
WP: Boomer Biegalski (7–4) LP: Johnny Piedmonte (1–1); Home runs: NCSU: None; FSU: John Sansone (8); Attendance: 9,759; Notes: Game Duration - 2:49; Boxscore
