= Cleveland S. Harley Baseball Park =

Baseball venue in Spartanburg, South Carolina

- Harley Park
- Interactive map of Cleveland S. Harley Baseball Park
- Location: North Campus Boulevard, Spartanburg, SC, USA
- Coordinates: 35.003968°N 81.970142°W
- Owner: University of South Carolina Upstate
- Operator: University of South Carolina Upstate
- Capacity: 500
- Surface: Natural grass/Bermuda grass
- Scoreboard: Yes
- Field size: 325 ft. (lines); 383 ft. (gaps); 402 ft. (CF)

Construction
- Opened: 2004

Tenant
- USC Upstate Spartans

Cleveland S. Harley Baseball Park is a baseball venue in Spartanburg, South Carolina. It is home to the USC Upstate Spartans baseball team of the NCAA's Division I Big South Conference. It opened on February 1, 2004, when Upstate swept a double header against Tusculum College. The facility has a capacity of 500 spectators.

The park is named for Cleveland S. Harley, a Spartanburg-area businessman and philanthropist. Harley played a role in both the university's founding and the development of its athletic programs. The venue also features a press box, practice facility, and batting cages. It is part of the Louis P. Howell Athletic Complex.

== Spartan home records ==
The following is a list of USC Upstate Spartans home records since Harley Park's opening in 2004. The Spartans moved from Division II to Division I in time for the beginning of the 2008 season.

Season	Wins	Losses	Ties	Win Pct.
2004	19	11	0	.633
2005	18	13	0	.581
2006	16	12	0	.571
2007	23	11	0	.676
2008	17	8	0	.680
2009	8	18	0	.308
2010	13	17	0	.433
2011	9	19	0	.321
2012	22	5	0	.815
2013	19	14	0	.576
2014	12	18	0	.400
2015	11	22	0	.333
2016	17	12	0	.586
2017	20	19	0	.513
2018	17	17	1	.500
2019	15	20	0	.429
2020	12	5	0	.706
2021	18	5	0	.783
2022	22	8	1	.726
Total	308	254	2	.548

== See also ==
- List of NCAA Division I baseball venues
