= 2015 College Baseball All-America Team =

This is a list of college baseball players named first team All-Americans for the 2015 NCAA Division I baseball season. From 2015 to 2018, there were six generally recognized All-America selectors for baseball: the American Baseball Coaches Association, Baseball America, Collegiate Baseball Newspaper, D1Baseball.com, the National Collegiate Baseball Writers Association, and Perfect Game. In order to be considered a "consensus" All-American, a player must have been selected by at least four of these.

== Key ==
A	American Baseball Coaches Association
B	Baseball America
C	Collegiate Baseball Newspaper
D	D1Baseball.com
N	National Collegiate Baseball Writers Association
P	Perfect Game
	Member of the National College Baseball Hall of Fame
	Consensus All-American – selected by all six organizations
	Consensus All-American – selected by four or five organizations

== All-Americans ==
Position	Name	School	#	A	B	C	D	N	P	Other awards and honors
Starting pitcher	Taylor Clarke	Charleston	5	✓	—	✓	✓	✓	✓	
Starting pitcher	Matthew Crownover	Clemson	2	—	—	✓	—	—	✓	
Starting pitcher	Tom Eshelman	Cal State Fullerton	3	✓	✓	—	✓	—	—	
Starting pitcher	Michael Freeman	Oklahoma State	3	✓	✓	—	—	✓	—	
Starting pitcher	Carson Fulmer	Vanderbilt	6	✓	✓	✓	✓	✓	✓	National Pitcher of the Year
Starting pitcher	Matt Hall	Missouri State	2	—	—	✓	✓	—	—	
Starting pitcher	James Kaprielian	UCLA	1	✓	—	—	—	—	—	
Starting pitcher	Alex Lange	LSU	4	—	✓	✓	—	✓	✓	
Starting pitcher	Mike Shawaryn	Maryland	3	—	—	✓	—	✓	✓	
Relief pitcher	David Berg	UCLA	5	✓	—	✓	✓	✓	✓	Stopper of the Year
Relief pitcher	Riley Ferrell	TCU	1	—	—	—	—	✓	—	
Relief pitcher	Tyler Jay	Illinois	5	✓	✓	✓	—	✓	✓	
Relief pitcher	Bryan Young	Missouri State	1	—	—	—	—	✓	—	
Catcher	Chris Okey	Clemson	2	—	—	—	—	✓	✓	
Catcher	Chris Robinson	Morehead State	1	—	—	✓	—	—	—	
Catcher	Kade Scivicque	LSU	1	—	—	—	✓	—	—	
Catcher	Garrett Stubbs	USC	2	✓	✓	—	—	—	—	Johnny Bench Award
First baseman	Will Craig	Wake Forest	5	✓	—	✓	✓	✓	✓	
First baseman	Kyle Martin	South Carolina	1	—	✓	—	—	—	—	
Second baseman	George Iskenderian	Miami (FL)	1	—	—	—	—	✓	—	
Second baseman	Scott Kingery	Arizona	4	✓	✓	—	✓	—	✓	
Second baseman	Melvin Rodriguez	Jackson State	1	—	—	✓	—	—	—	
Shortstop / DH	Alex Bregman	LSU	3	—	✓	✓	✓	—	—	
Shortstop	Dansby Swanson	Vanderbilt	5	✓	✓	—	✓	✓	✓	ABCA Player of the Year Brooks Wallace Award First overall pick in the 2015 MLB draft
Third baseman	David Thompson	Miami (FL)	6	✓	✓	✓	✓	✓	✓	
Outfielder	Andrew Benintendi	Arkansas	6	✓	✓	✓	✓	✓	✓	Dick Howser Trophy Golden Spikes Award Baseball America Player of the Year Collegiate Baseball Player of the Year
Outfielder	Donnie Dewees	North Florida	5	—	✓	✓	✓	✓	✓	
Outfielder	Ian Happ	Cincinnati	3	✓	—	—	✓	—	✓	
Outfielder / DH	Kevin Kaczmarski	Evansville	3	—	—	✓	—	✓	✓	
Outfielder	DJ Stewart	Florida State	3	✓	✓	—	—	✓	—	
Designated hitter	Carmen Benedetti	Michigan	1	—	—	—	—	✓	—	
Designated hitter	David Olmedo-Barrera	Cal State Fullerton	1	✓	—	—	—	—	—	
Utility player	Jacob Cronenworth	Michigan	1	✓	—	—	—	—	—	
Utility player	Brendan McKay	Louisville	4	—	✓	—	✓	✓	✓	John Olerud Award
Utility player	Corbin Olmstead	North Florida	1	—	—	✓	—	—	—	

== See also ==
- List of college baseball awards
