= 2015 NCAA All-American =

2015 NCAA All-American may refer to:

- 2015 NCAA Men's Basketball All-Americans
- 2015 College Baseball All-America Team
- 2015 College Football All-America Team
