= 2015 Notre Dame Fighting Irish baseball team =

American college baseball season

2015 Notre Dame Fighting Irish baseball
- Conference: Atlantic Coast Conference
- Record: 36–21 (17–13 ACC)
- Head coach: Mik Aoki (5th season)
- Assistant coaches: Jesse Woods (5th season); Chuck Ristano (5th season)
- Home stadium: Frank Eck Stadium

2015 Atlantic Coast Conference baseball standings
	Conf.				Overall
Team	W		L	PCT	W		L	PCT
Atlantic
No. 10 Louisville ^{x}‍‍‍^{y}	25	–	5	.833	47	–	18	.723
No. 26 Notre Dame ‍‍‍^{y}	17	–	13	.567	37	–	23	.617
No. 12 Florida State ‍‍‡‍^{y}	17	–	13	.567	44	–	21	.677
Clemson ‍‍‍^{y}	16	–	13	.552	32	–	29	.525
NC State ‍‍‍^{y}	15	–	14	.517	36	–	23	.610
Wake Forest ‍‍‍	12	–	18	.400	27	–	26	.509
Boston College ‍‍‍	10	–	19	.345	27	–	27	.500
Coastal
No. 6 Miami (FL) ^{x}‍‍‍^{y}	22	–	8	.733	50	–	16	.758
No. 1 Virginia ‍‍‍^{y}	15	–	15	.500	44	–	24	.647
North Carolina ‍‍‍	13	–	16	.448	34	–	24	.586
Virginia Tech ‍‍‍	13	–	16	.448	27	–	27	.500
Georgia Tech ‍‍‍	13	–	17	.433	32	–	23	.582
Duke ‍‍‍	10	–	19	.345	31	–	22	.585
Pittsburgh ‍‍‍	9	–	21	.300	20	–	32	.385
x – Division champion ‡ – Tournament champion y – Invited to the NCAA tournament As of June 30, 2015; Rankings from Collegiate Baseball

The 2015 Notre Dame Fighting Irish baseball team represented the University of Notre Dame during the 2015 NCAA Division I baseball season. The Fighting Irish played their home games at Frank Eck Stadium as a member of the Atlantic Coast Conference. They were led by head coach Mik Aoki, in his 5th season at Notre Dame.

== Previous season ==
In 2014, the Fighting Irish finished the season 7th in the ACC's Atlantic Division with a record of 22–31, 9–21 in conference play. They failed to qualify for the 2014 Atlantic Coast Conference baseball tournament or the 2014 NCAA Division I baseball tournament.

== Personnel ==
=== Roster ===
2015 Notre Dame Fighting Irish roster
Pitchers: 3 – Ryan Smoyer – Sophomore; 5 – Nick McCarty – Junior; 11 – David Hearne – Junior; 12 – Brandon Bielak – Freshman; 17 – Cristian Torres – Senior; 18 – Charlie Vorsheck – Freshman; 21 – Joey Cresta – Junior; 27 – Jim Orwick – Sophomore; 28 – Michael Hearne – Junior; 31 – Scott Kerrigan – Senior; 32 – Connor Hale – Junior; 35 – Peter Solomon – Freshman; 37 – Kyle Rubbinaccio – Senior; 38 – Scott Tully – Sophomore; 42 – Matt Ternowchek – Senior; 44 – Evy Ruibal – Freshman; 45 – Brad Bass – Freshman; 50 – Sean Guenther – Freshman	Catchers: 30 – Forrest Johnson – Senior; 36 – Ryan Lidge – Sophomore; Infielders: 0 – Jake Shepski – Freshman; 4 – Lane Richards – Junior; 6 – Kevin DeFilippis – Senior; 8 – Blaise Lezynski – Senior; 16 – Zak Kutsulis – Junior; 20 – Kyle Fiala – Sophomore; 23 – Cavan Biggio – Sophomore; 33 – Phil Mosey – Senior	Outfielders: 2 – Torii Hunter Jr. – Sophomore; 10 – Conor Biggio – Senior; 13 – Mac Hudgins – Senior; 14 – Kyle Richardson – Junior; 19 – Ryan Bull – Senior; 22 – Ricky Sanchez – Junior; 25 – Robert Youngdahl – Senior; 26 – James Nevant – Junior; 39 – Jake Johnson – Freshman

=== Coaching staff ===
Name	Position	Seasons at Notre Dame	Alma mater
Mik Aoki	Head coach	5	Davidson College (1990)
Jesse Woods	Assistant coach	5	Wheaton College (2004)
Chuck Ristano	Assistant coach	5	Sacred Heart University (2004)

== Schedule ==
Legend
	Notre Dame win
	Notre Dame loss
	Postponement
**Bold**	Notre Dame team member

2015 Notre Dame Fighting Irish baseball game log
Regular season
February

Date	Opponent	Rank	Site/stadium	Score	Win	Loss	Save	Attendance	Overall record	ACC Record
February 13	vs. SIU Edwardsville		L. Dale Mitchell Park • Norman, OK	7–6	**Peter Solomon** (1–0)	Brett Thomas (0–1)		1,283	1–0	
February 13	at Oklahoma		L. Dale Mitchell Park • Norman, OK	1–6	Jake Elliott (1–0)	**Scott Kerrigan** (0–1)		1,283	1–1	
February 14	at Oklahoma		L. Dale Mitchell Park • Norman, OK	10–9	**Brandon Bielak** (1–0)	Alec Hansen (0–1)	**Ryan Smoyer** (1)	1,735	2–1	
February 15	at Oklahoma		L. Dale Mitchell Park • Norman, OK	5–1	**Nick McCarty** (1–0)	Adam Choplick (0–1)	**Peter Solomon** (1)	1,735	3–1	
February 19	vs. Incarnate Word		Nelson Wolff Stadium • San Antonio, TX	14–1	**Michael Hearne** (1–0)	Cody Richey (0–2)		335	4–1	
February 20	vs. Villanova		Nelson Wolff Stadium • San Antonio, TX	8–1	**Scott Kerrigan** (1–1)	Mike Sgaramella (0–1)		333	5–1	
February 21	vs. Northwestern		Nelson Wolff Stadium • San Antonio, TX	7–3	**Scott Tully** (1–0)	Matt Portland (0–2)		572	6–1	
February 22	vs. Incarnate Word		Nelson Wolff Stadium • San Antonio, TX	11–1	**Nick McCarty** (2–0)	Kris Looper (0–1)		269	7–1	
February 27	vs. Belmont		Claude Smith Field • Macon, GA	6–4	**Scott Tully** (2–0)	Aaron Quillen (1–1)	**Peter Solomon** (2)	147	8–1	
February 28	at Mercer		Claude Smith Field • Macon, GA	8–2	**Brandon Bielak** (2–0)	Connor Herd (1–1)		408	9–1	
February 28	vs. Akron		Claude Smith Field • Macon, GA	5–4	**Brad Bass** (1–0)	Matt LaRocca (0–1)		204	10–1	

March

Date	Opponent	Rank	Site/stadium	Score	Win	Loss	Save	Attendance	Overall record	ACC Record
March 6	at No. 28 Georgia Tech	No. 25	Russ Chandler Stadium • Atlanta, GA	3–2 ^{(10)}	**Brad Bass** (2–0)	Matthew Gorst (0–2)	**Peter Solomon** (3)	1,108	11–1	1–0
March 7	at No. 28 Georgia Tech	No. 25	Russ Chandler Stadium • Atlanta, GA	7–11	Zac Ryan (3–0)	**Brandon Bielak** (2–1)		1,821	11–2	1–1
March 8	at No. 28 Georgia Tech	No. 25	Russ Chandler Stadium • Atlanta, GA	1–4	Brandon Gold (2–0)	**Nick McCarty** (2–1)		1,887	11–3	1–2
March 11	at Savannah State	No. 27	Tiger Field • Savannah, GA	5–3 ^{(11)}	**Peter Solomon** (2–0)	Zach Chandler (0–1)	**Brad Bass** (1)	210	12–3	
March 14	at Clemson	No. 27	Doug Kingsmore Stadium • Clemson, SC	1–6	Matthew Crownover (4–0)	**Scott Kerrigan** (1–2)		4,961	12–4	1–3
March 14	at Clemson	No. 27	Doug Kingsmore Stadium • Clemson, SC	11–6	**Sean Guenther** (1–0)	Pat Krall (0–1)	**Peter Solomon** (4)	4,961	13–4	2–3
March 15	at Clemson	No. 27	Doug Kingsmore Stadium • Clemson, SC	5–1	**Nick McCarty** (3–1)	Zack Erwin (1–3)		4,343	14–4	3–3
March 17	Bethel (IN)		Frank Eck Stadium • Notre Dame, IN	Cancelled						
March 18	Central Michigan	No. 22	Frank Eck Stadium • Notre Dame, IN	8–3	**Ryan Smoyer** (1–0)	Jordan Grosjean (0–3)		613	15–4	
March 20	No. 17 Louisville	No. 22	Frank Eck Stadium • Notre Dame, IN	0–2	Kyle Funkhouser (2–2)	**Scott Kerrigan** (1–3)	Drew Harrington (3)	572	15–5	3–4
March 21	No. 17 Louisville	No. 22	Frank Eck Stadium • Notre Dame, IN	4–6 ^{(18)}	Sean Leland (1–0)	**Scott Tully** (2–1)		746	15–6	3–5
March 22	No. 17 Louisville	No. 22	Frank Eck Stadium • Notre Dame, IN	0–3	Josh Rogers (3–1)	**Nick McCarty** (3–2)	Drew Harrington (4)	476	15–7	3–6
March 25	Western Michigan		Frank Eck Stadium • Notre Dame, IN	8–3	**Ryan Smoyer** (2–0)	Tanner Allison (1–5)		215	16–7	
March 28	No. 25 Virginia		Frank Eck Stadium • Notre Dame, IN	1–9	Nathan Kirby (4–1)	**Scott Kerrigan** (1–4)	Kevin Doherty (2)	783	16–8	3–7
March 28	No. 25 Virginia		Frank Eck Stadium • Notre Dame, IN	2–4	Tommy Doyle (1–0)	**Sean Guenther** (1–1)	Josh Sborz (6)	783	16–9	3–8
March 29	No. 25 Virginia		Frank Eck Stadium • Notre Dame, IN	4–5	Brandon Waddell (2–1)	**Nick McCarty** (3–3)	Josh Sborz (7)	377	16–10	3–9
March 31	Eastern Michigan		Frank Eck Stadium • Notre Dame, IN	6–0	**Ryan Smoyer** (3–0)	Adam Hornstra (0–1)		363	17–10	

April

Date	Opponent	Rank	Site/stadium	Score	Win	Loss	Save	Attendance	Overall record	ACC Record
April 4	at Pittsburgh		Charles L. Cost Field • Pittsburgh, PA	8–1	**Brandon Bielak** (3–1)	T. J. Zeuch (2–4)		511	18–10	4–9
April 4	at Pittsburgh		Charles L. Cost Field • Pittsburgh, PA	7–1	**Nick McCarty** (4–3)	Aaron Sandefur (1–4)		511	19–10	5–9
April 5	at Pittsburgh		Charles L. Cost Field • Pittsburgh, PA	7–3	**Ryan Smoyer** (4–0)	Marc Berube (0–4)	**Sean Guenther** (1)	384	20–10	6–9
April 8	Valparaiso		Frank Eck Stadium • Notre Dame, IN	6–0	**Scott Tully** (3–1)	Connor Kaucic (1–3)		417	21–10	
April 10	No. 7 Florida State		Frank Eck Stadium • Notre Dame, IN	5–2	**Ryan Smoyer** (5–0)	Boomer Biegalski (2–3)	**Sean Guenther** (2)	522	22–10	7–9
April 11	No. 7 Florida State		Frank Eck Stadium • Notre Dame, IN	4–1	**Brandon Bielak** (4–1)	Drew Carlton (2–2)	**Sean Guenther** (3)	1,109	23–10	8–9
April 12	No. 7 Florida State		Frank Eck Stadium • Notre Dame, IN	2–1	**Connor Hale** (1–0)	Mike Compton (1–1)	**Scott Tully** (1)	896	24–10	9–9
April 15	Toledo	No. 25	Frank Eck Stadium • Notre Dame, IN	0–5	Alex Wagner (2–3)	**Scott Tully** (3–2)	Kevin Kline (1)	344	24–11	
April 17	NC State	No. 25	Frank Eck Stadium • Notre Dame, IN	2–0	**Ryan Smoyer** (6–0)	Cory Wilder (2–5)	**Sean Guenther** (4)	555	25–11	10–9
April 18	NC State	No. 25	Frank Eck Stadium • Notre Dame, IN	2–4 ^{(14)}	Joe O'Donnell (5–2)	**Evy Ruibal** (0–1)		1,230	25–12	10–10
April 18	NC State	No. 25	Frank Eck Stadium • Notre Dame, IN	7–2	**Nick McCarty** (5–3)	Ryan Williamson (3–2)		1,230	26–12	11–10
April 21	vs. Indiana	No. 26	Victory Field • Indianapolis, IN	5–6	Ryan Halstead (1–1)	**Sean Guenther** (1–2)		8,728	26–13	
April 22	Chicago State	No. 26	Frank Eck Stadium • Notre Dame, IN	11–0	**Connor Hale** (2–0)	Ean McNeal (0–1)		235	27–13	
April 24	at Wake Forest	No. 26	Wake Forest Baseball Park • Winston-Salem, NC	9–5	**Scott Kerrigan** (2–4)	Matt Pirro (6–3)		1,153	28–13	12–10
April 25	at Wake Forest	No. 26	Wake Forest Baseball Park • Winston-Salem, NC	2–4	Will Craig (2–3)	**Evy Ruibal** (0–2)	Parker Dunshee (3)	608	28–14	12–11
April 26	at Wake Forest	No. 26	Wake Forest Baseball Park • Winston-Salem, NC	4–5 ^{(11)}	Donnie Sellers (4–1)	**Scott Tully** (3–3)		608	28–15	12–12
April 28	Michigan State		Frank Eck Stadium • Notre Dame, IN	6–9 ^{(12)}	Walter Borkovich (2–0)	**Evy Ruibal** (0–3)		414	28–16	
April 29	Sacramento State		Frank Eck Stadium • Notre Dame, IN	2–0	**Nick McCarty** (6–3)	Jared Paderez (1–1)		441	29–16	

May

Date	Opponent	Rank	Site/stadium	Score	Win	Loss	Save	Attendance	Overall record	ACC Record
May 1	Northwestern State		Frank Eck Stadium • Notre Dame, IN	4–1	**Scott Kerrigan** (3–4)	Adam Oller (6–3)	**Brad Bass** (2)	416	30–16	
May 2	Northwestern State		Frank Eck Stadium • Notre Dame, IN	2–8	Josh Oller (8–1)	**Brandon Bielak** (4–2)		617	30–17	
May 3	Northwestern State		Frank Eck Stadium • Notre Dame, IN	4–8	Jeffrey Stovall (5–4)	**Scott Tully** (3–4)	Brandon Smith (8)	579	30–18	
May 9	No. 24 North Carolina		Frank Eck Stadium • Notre Dame, IN	10–5	**Scott Tully** (4–4)	Trevor Kelley (5–2)		1,064	31–18	13–12
May 9	No. 24 North Carolina		Frank Eck Stadium • Notre Dame, IN	3–1	**Ryan Smoyer** (7–0)	J. B. Bukauskas (4–2)		1,064	32–18	14–12
May 10	No. 24 North Carolina		Frank Eck Stadium • Notre Dame, IN	8–7	**Brad Bass** (3–0)	Trent Thornton (3–5)		406	33–18	15–12
May 14	at Boston College	No. 24	Pellagrini Diamond • Chestnut Hill, MA	10–4	**Brandon Bielak** (5–2)	Mike King (1–5)		604	34–18	16–12
May 15	at Boston College	No. 24	Pellagrini Diamond • Chestnut Hill, MA	5–2	**Ryan Smoyer** (8–0)	Justin Dunn (4–4)	**Sean Guenther** (5)	412	35–18	17–12
May 15	at Boston College	No. 24	Pellagrini Diamond • Chestnut Hill, MA	5–6 ^{(10)}	Nick Poore (3–3)	**Sean Guenther** (1–3)		202	35–19	17–13

Postseason
ACC Tournament

Date	Opponent	Rank	Site/stadium	Score	Win	Loss	Save	Attendance	Overall record	ACCT Record
May 21	vs. NC State	No. 20	Durham Bulls Athletic Park • Durham, NC	0–3	Brian Brown (7–3)	**Scott Kerrigan** (3–5)	Curt Britt (2)	3,599	35–20	0–1
May 22	vs. No. 29 Virginia	No. 20	Durham Bulls Athletic Park • Durham, NC	8–2	**Ryan Smoyer** (9–0)	Brandon Waddell (3–5)	**Brandon Bielak** (1)	2,916	36–20	1–1
May 23	vs. No. 6 Miami (FL)	No. 20	Durham Bulls Athletic Park • Durham, NC	5–6	Cooper Hammond (5–1)	**Brad Bass** (3–1)		4,249	36–21	1–2

NCAA tournament: Champaign Regional

Date	Opponent	Rank	Site/stadium	Score	Win	Loss	Save	Attendance	Overall record	NCAAT Record
May 29	vs. Wright State	No. 23	Illinois Field • Champaign, IL	13–7	**Brandon Bielak** (6–2)	Trevor Swaney (4–3)		1,454	37–21	1–0
May 31	at No. 3 Illinois	No. 23	Illinois Field • Champaign, IL	0–3	Drasen Johnson (10–3)	**Ryan Smoyer** (9–1)		3,002	37–22	1–1
May 31	vs. Wright State	No. 23	Illinois Field • Champaign, IL	0–4	Jack Van Horn (4–2)	**Brandon Bielak** (6–3)		1,292	37–23	1–2

All rankings from Collegiate Baseball.

== 2015 MLB draft ==
The following Notre Dame players were drafted in the 2015 Major League Baseball draft.

Player	Position	Round	Overall	MLB team
Conor Biggio	Outfielder	34	1,009	Houston Astros

== Ranking Movements ==
Ranking movements Legend: ██ Increase in ranking ██ Decrease in ranking — = Not ranked RV = Received votes
	Week																		
Poll	Pre	1	2	3	4	5	6	7	8	9	10	11	12	13	14	15	16	17	Final
Coaches'	—	—*		RV	RV	RV	RV	—	—	RV	RV	RV	—	RV	RV	RV			
Baseball America	—	—	—	—	—	—	—	—	—	—	—	—	—	—	—	—			
Collegiate Baseball^	—	—	—	25	27	22	—	—	—	25	26	—	—	24	20	23			
NCBWA†	—	RV	RV	—	—	RV	—	—	—	RV	RV	RV	—	RV	RV	RV			

^ Collegiate Baseball ranked 40 teams in their preseason poll, but only ranked 30 teams weekly during the season.
† NCBWA ranks 30 teams in their preseason poll, but only ranks 25 teams weekly during the season.
* A new poll was not released for this week, so for comparison purposes, the previous week's ranking is inserted in this week's slot.
