= 2015 Cal State Fullerton Titans baseball team =

American college baseball season

2015 Cal State Fullerton Titans baseball

Big West Champions Fullerton Regional Champion Louisville Super Regional Champion

College World Series
- Conference: Big West Conference

Ranking
- Coaches: No. 7
- CB: No. 8
- Record: 39–23 (19–5 Big West)
- Head coach: Rick Vanderhook (4th year)
- Home stadium: Goodwin Field

2015 Big West Conference baseball standings
	Conf.						Overall
Team	W		L		T	PCT	W		L		T	PCT
#6 Cal State Fullerton †y ‍‍‍	19	–	5	–	0	.792	39	–	25	–	0	.609
#25 UC Santa Barbara y ‍‍‍	16	–	8	–	0	.667	40	–	17	–	1	.698
UC Irvine ‍‍‍	15	–	9	–	0	.625	33	–	23	–	0	.589
Cal Poly ‍‍‍	14	–	10	–	0	.583	27	–	27	–	0	.500
Hawaii ‍‍‍	12	–	12	–	0	.500	21	–	32	–	0	.396
Long Beach State ‍‍‍	11	–	13	–	0	.458	28	–	26	–	0	.519
UC Davis ‍‍‍	9	–	15	–	0	.375	30	–	26	–	1	.535
Cal State Northridge ‍‍‍	8	–	16	–	0	.333	33	–	24	–	0	.579
UC Riverside ‍‍‍	4	–	20	–	0	.167	15	–	40	–	0	.273
† – Conference champion y – Invited to the NCAA tournament As of June 8, 2015; Rankings from Collegiate Baseball

The 2015 Cal State Fullerton Titans baseball team represented California State University, Fullerton in the 2015 NCAA Division I baseball season. The Titans played their home games at Goodwin Field and were members of the Big West Conference. The team was coached by Rick Vanderhook in his 4th season at Cal State Fullerton.

== Schedule ==
2015 Cal State Fullerton Titans baseball game log
Regular season

February
Date	Opponent	Site/stadium	Score	Win	Loss	Save	Attendance	Overall record	Big West Record
February 13	at South Florida	Bright House Field • Clearwater, FL	L 1–2	Cavallaro (1–0)	Eshelman (0–1)	Peterson (1)		0–1	
February 14	vs Alabama State	Bright House Field • Clearwater, FL	L 2–3	Camacho (1–0)	Chambers (0–1)	Ruiz (1)		0–2	
February 15	vs Louisville	Bright House Field • Clearwater, FL	W 8–6	Gavin (1–0)	Rogers (0–1)	Peitzmeier (1)		1–2	
February 17	Southern California	Goodwin Field • Fullerton, CA	L 4–6	Flores (1–0)	Chambers (0–2)	Davis (2)	2,573	1–3	
February 20	Stanford	Goodwin Field • Fullerton, CA	L 0–2	Quantrill (1–0)	Eshelman (0–2)	Hock (1)	2,548	1–4	
February 21	Stanford	Goodwin Field • Fullerton, CA	W 4–2	Murray (1–0)	Brakeman (0–1)	Peitzmeier (2)	2,408	2–4	
February 22	Stanford	Goodwin Field • Fullerton, CA	L 9–11	Weisenberg (1–1)	Gibbs (0–1)	None	1,720	2–5	
February 27	Baylor	Goodwin Field • Fullerton, CA	W 10–1	Eshelman (1–2)	Tolson (0–1)	None	1,442	3–5	
February 27	Baylor	Goodwin Field • Fullerton, CA	W 11–6	Seabold (1–0)	Kirkland (2–1)	None	1,422	4–5	
February 28	Baylor	Goodwin Field • Fullerton, CA	W 7–6	Kuhl (1–0)	Montemayor (0–2)	Peitzmeier (3)	1,184	5–5	

March
Date	Opponent	Site/stadium	Score	Win	Loss	Save	Attendance	Overall record	Big West Record
March 3	Pepperdine	Goodwin Field • Fullerton, CA	W 3–0	Kuhl (2–0)	Garcia (0–1)	Peitzmeier (4)	1,568	6–5	
March 6	Texas Tech	Goodwin Field • Fullerton, CA	W 4–0	Eshelman (2–2)	Smith (1–1)	None	1,777	7–5	
March 7	Texas Tech	Goodwin Field • Fullerton, CA	W 3–2	Garza (1–0)	Moseley (1–1)	Peitzmeier (5)	2,640	8–5	
March 8	Texas Tech	Goodwin Field • Fullerton, CA	W 6–5	Gavin (2–0)	Dusek (2–1)	Peitzmeier (6)	1,623	9–5	
March 10	San Diego	Goodwin Field • Fullerton, CA	L 4–9	Hill (4–1)	Murray (1–1)	None	1,258	9–6	
March 14	at Indiana	Bart Kaufman Field • Bloomington, IN	L 0–2	Harrison (2–0)	Gibbs (1–2)	None	1,906	9–7	
March 14	at Indiana	Bart Kaufman Field • Bloomington, IN	L 4–5^{10}	Hobbie (2–0)	Garza (1–1)	Halstead (3)	1,906	9–8	
March 15	at Indiana	Bart Kaufman Field • Bloomington, IN	L 4–10	Bell (2–1)	Seabold (1–1)	None	2,911	9–9	
March 18	Cal State Bakersfield	Goodwin Field • Fullerton, CA	W 11–0	Seabold (2–1)	Barragan (1–3)	None	1,356	10–9	
March 20	at Long Beach State	Blair Field • Long Beach, CA	L 3–4^{12}	McCaughan (1–0)	Chambers (0–3)	None	2,347	10–10	
March 21	at Long Beach State	Blair Field • Long Beach, CA	W 2–1^{10}	Gibbs (1–2)	Provencher (1–1)	Peitzmeier (7)	1,760	11–10	
March 22	at Long Beach State	Blair Field • Long Beach, CA	L 1–6	Mathewson (2–2)	Gavin (2–1)	None	2,448	11–11	
March 24	at Nebraska	Haymarket Park • Lincoln, NE	L 2–7	King (2–0)	Seabold (2–2)	none	2,021	11–12	
March 25	at Nebraska	Haymarket Park • Lincoln, NE	W 4–3	Chambers (1–3)	Engelken (1–1)	Peitzmeier (8)	1,908	12–12	
March 27	at Cal State Northridge	Matador Field • Northridge, CA	W 5–3	Eshelman (3–2)	O'Neil (2–2)	Peitzmeier (9)	287	13–12	1–0
March 28	at Cal State Northridge	Matador Field • Northridge, CA	L 3–4	Keel (4–1)	Garza (1–2)	Ryan (1)	295	13–13	1–1
March 29	at Cal State Northridge	Matador Field • Northridge, CA	W 7–2	Gavin (3–1)	Raven (4–2)	None	282	14–13	2–1

April
Date	Opponent	Site/stadium	Score	Win	Loss	Save	Attendance	Overall record	Big West Record
April 2	Cal Poly	Goodwin Field • Fullerton, CA	L 0–5	Bloomquist (3–2)	Eshelman (3–3)	None	1,448	14–14	2–2
April 3	Cal Poly	Goodwin Field • Fullerton, CA	W 2–1	Garza (2–2)	Smith (2–5)	Peitzmeier (10)	2,056	15–14	3–2
April 4	Cal Poly	Goodwin Field • Fullerton, CA	W 13–2	Gavin (4–1)	Bernstein (3–3)	None	1,675	16–14	4–2
April 7	at San Diego	Fowler Park • San Diego, CA	W 6–4	Chambers (2–3)	Jacobs (1–1)	Peitzmeier (11)	688	17–14	
April 10	at UC Davis	Dobbins Baseball Complex • Davis, CA	L 2–3	Koopmans (3–3)	Eshelman (3–4)	Stone (7)	410	17–15	4–3
April 11	at UC Davis	Dobbins Baseball Complex • Davis, CA	W 10–6	Garza (3–2)	Jacobson (3–2)	Peitzmeier (12)	427	18–15	5–3
April 12	at UC Davis	Dobbins Baseball Complex • Davis, CA	W 13–3	Gavin (5–1)	Cordy (7–1)	None	578	19–15	6–3
April 14	at UCLA	Jackie Robinson Stadium • Los Angeles, CA	L 2–7	Poteet (3–1)	Peitzmeier (0–1)	None	761	19–16	
April 17	at Maryland	Shipley Field • College Park, MD	L 1–2	Shawaryn (9–0)	Eshelman (3–5)	Robinson (3)	1,370	19–17	
April 18	at Maryland	Shipley Field • College Park, MD	L 5–9	Galligan (1–2)	Garza (3–3)	None	906	19–18	
April 19	at Maryland	Shipley Field • College Park, MD	W 1–0^{10}	Peitzmeier (1–1)	Robinson (1–1)	None	813	20–18	
April 22	at Cal State Bakersfield	Hardt Field • Bakersfield, CA	L 1–14	Daily (2–3)	Seabold (2–3)	None	643	20–19	
April 24	UC Irvine	Goodwin Field • Fullerton, CA	W 7–2	Eshelman (4–5)	Surrey (4–4)	None	2,518	21–19	7–3
April 25	UC Irvine	Goodwin Field • Fullerton, CA	L 4–5^{10}	Bishop (2–0)	Peitzmeier (1–2)	None	2,146	21–20	7–4
April 26	UC Irvine	Goodwin Field • Fullerton, CA	W 7–5	Gibbs (2–2)	Manarino (4–2)	Seabold (1)	2,006	22–20	8–4
April 28	Southern California	Goodwin Field • Fullerton, CA	W 5–3^{12}	Peitzmeier (2–2)	Huberman (6–3)	None	334	23–20	

May
Date	Opponent	Site/stadium	Score	Win	Loss	Save	Attendance	Overall record	Big West Record
May 1	at UC Riverside	Riverside Sports Complex • Riverside, CA	W 9–0						
May 2	at UC Riverside	Riverside Sports Complex • Riverside, CA	W 19–0						
May 3	at UC Riverside	Riverside Sports Complex • Riverside, CA	W 7–4						
May 8	UC Santa Barbara	Goodwin Field • Fullerton, CA	W 3–0						
May 9	UC Santa Barbara	Goodwin Field • Fullerton, CA	W 10–1						
May 10	UC Santa Barbara	Goodwin Field • Fullerton, CA	L 2–3						
May 12	UCLA	Goodwin Field • Fullerton, CA	L 4–5^{10}						
May 15	at Hawaii	Les Murakami Stadium • Honolulu, HI	W 4–0						
May 16	at Hawaii	Les Murakami Stadium • Honolulu, HI	W 4–2						
May 17	at Hawaii	Les Murakami Stadium • Honolulu, HI	W 5–2						
May 21	Long Beach State	Goodwin Field • Fullerton, CA	W 4–2						
May 22	Long Beach State	Goodwin Field • Fullerton, CA	W 4–0						
May 23	Long Beach State	Goodwin Field • Fullerton, CA	W 5–3						

Postseason

NCAA Fullerton Regional
Date	Opponent	Site/stadium	Score	Win	Loss	Save	Attendance	Overall record	NCAAT record
May 29	Pepperdine	Goodwin Field • Fullerton, CA	W 9–3						
May 30	Arizona State	Goodwin Field • Fullerton, CA	W 3–2^{14}						
May 31	Pepperdine	Goodwin Field • Fullerton, CA	W 10–1						

NCAA Louisville Super Regional
Date	Opponent	Site/stadium	Score	Win	Loss	Save	Attendance	Overall record	NCAAT record
June 6	at (3) #4 Louisville	Jim Patterson Stadium • Louisville, KY	W 3–2	Peitzmeier (4–3)	Henzman (5–2)	None	4,765	38–22	4–0
June 7	at (3) #4 Louisville	Jim Patterson Stadium • Louisville, KY	L 3–9	McKay (9–3)	Gavin (7–3)	None	4,547	38–23	4–1
June 8	at (3) #4 Louisville	Jim Patterson Stadium • Louisville, KY	W 4–3^{11}	Petzmeier (4–3)	Burdi (6–1)	Eshelman (1)	6,010	39–23	5–1

College World Series
Date	Opponent	Site/stadium	Score	Win	Loss	Save	Attendance	Overall record	CWS record
June 14	vs. Vanderbilt	TD Ameritrade Park • Omaha, NE	3-4	Wright (6–1)	Peitzmeier (5–4)		21,674	39-24	0–1
June 16	vs. (2) LSU	TD Ameritrade Park • Omaha, NE	3-5	Lange (12–0)	Seabold (5–4)		18,751	39-25	0–2
