= 2015 Oregon State Beavers baseball team =

American college baseball season

2015 Oregon State Beavers baseball

Dallas Regional, 1–2
- Conference: Pac-12 Conference
- Record: 39–18–1 (19–10–1 Pac-12)
- Head coach: Pat Casey (21st season)
- Assistant coaches: Pat Bailey (8th season); Andy Jenkins (3rd season)
- Pitching coach: Nate Yeskie (7th season)
- Home stadium: Goss Stadium at Coleman Field

2015 Pac-12 Conference baseball standings
	Conf.						Overall
Team	W		L		T	PCT	W		L		T	PCT
No. 2 UCLA ‍†‍‍^{y}	22	–	8	–	0	.733	42	–	14	–	0	.750
No. 12 Oregon State ‍‍‍^{y}	19	–	10	–	1	.650	38	–	16	–	1	.700
No. 16 California ‍‍‍^{y}	18	–	12	–	0	.600	34	–	19	–	0	.642
No. 17 USC ‍‍‍^{y}	18	–	12	–	0	.600	37	–	19	–	0	.661
No. 18 Arizona State ‍‍‍^{y}	18	–	12	–	0	.600	34	–	21	–	0	.618
Oregon ‍‍‍^{y}	16	–	14	–	0	.533	37	–	23	–	0	.617
Washington ‍‍‍	14	–	16	–	0	.467	29	–	25	–	0	.537
Arizona ‍‍‍	12	–	18	–	0	.400	31	–	24	–	0	.564
Washington State ‍‍‍	11	–	19	–	0	.367	29	–	27	–	0	.518
Stanford ‍‍‍	9	–	21	–	0	.300	24	–	32	–	0	.429
Utah ‍‍‍	7	–	22	–	1	.250	16	–	36	–	1	.311
† – Conference champion y – Invited to the NCAA tournament As of May 25, 2015; Rankings from Collegiate Baseball

The 2015 Oregon State Beavers baseball team represented Oregon State University in the 2015 NCAA Division I baseball season. The Beavers played their home games at Goss Stadium at Coleman Field and were members of the Pac-12 Conference. The team was coached by Pat Casey in his 21st season at Oregon State.

== Awards and honors ==
2015 was another award-winning year for Oregon State. It was the fourth straight year a Beaver player garnered a major conference award and third year in a row that at least four players were named to the All-Conference First Team.

2015 Pac-12 Conference Baseball Awards
Major Award: KJ Harrison - Freshman of the Year; First Team All-Conference: KJ Harrison 1B/C Fr.; Jeff Hendrix OF Jr. (2); Andrew Moore P Jr. (2); Drew Rasmussen P Fr.; Kyle Nobach OF So. Honorable Mention; All-Defensive Team: Jeff Hendrix OF Jr. (2); Andrew Moore P Jr.; (#) - Denotes number of times player has been selected

== Postseason ==
Although the Beavers finished second in the Pac-12 they were not selected as a Regional host site for the opening round of the 2015 NCAA Division I baseball tournament. Oregon State was the #2 seed of the Dallas Regional with host and #1 seed Dallas Baptist, #3 Texas and #4 Virginia Commonwealth. After winning their first game against Texas the Beavers were eliminated after dropping two straight versus VCU and Dallas Baptist.

== Roster ==
2015 Oregon State Beavers roster
Pitchers: 3 Scotland Church - Sophomore; 6 Ryan Mets - Freshman; 12 Sam Tweedt - Freshman; 15 Luke Heimlich - Freshman; 17 Mak Fox - Sophomore; 20 Mitch Hickey - Freshman; 23 Andrew Moore - Junior; 25 Drew Rasmussen - Freshman; 26 Trent Shelton - Sophomore; 31 Kevin Flemer - Sophomore; 32 Travis Eckert - Junior; 34 Clay Bauer - (redshirt) Senior; 35 John Pomeroy - Sophomore; 36 Austin Woodward - (redshirt) Junior; 38 Zack Reser - (redshirt) Senior; 44 Jake Thompson - Sophomore	Catchers: 18 Dane Lund - Senior; 24 KJ Harrison - Freshman; 33 Logan Ice - Sophomore; Infielders: 1 Christian Donahue - Freshman; 2 Joe Gillette - Freshman; 4 Tyler Mildenberg - Sophomore; 7 Trever Morrison - Sophomore; 10 Michael Gretler - Freshman; 11 Jackson Soto - Freshman; 14 Caleb Hamilton - Sophomore; 16 Gabe Clark - Junior; 19 Billy King - Sophomore	Outfielders: 9 Cary, Elliott - Freshman; 28 Kyle Nobach - Sophomore; 29 Jack Anderson - (redshirt) Freshman; 30 Michael Howard - Senior; 37 Cooper Brunner - Freshman; 40 Jeff Hendrix - Junior; 45 Joey Jansen - (redshirt) Junior

== Coaches ==
2014 Oregon State Beavers baseball coaching staff
- 5 Pat Casey - Head coach - 21st year
- 27 Pat Bailey - Assistant coach - 8th year
- 2 Andy Jenkins - Assistant coach - 3rd year
- 21 Nate Yeskie - Assistant coach - 7th year

== Schedule ==
2005 Oregon State Beavers baseball game log (52–13)
Regular season (38–16–1)
February (8–3)

#	Date	Opponent	Rank	Site/stadium	Score	Overall record	Pac-12 record
1	Feb 13	vs. Northwestern		Surprise Stadium • Surprise, AZ	W 2–1	1–0	–
2	Feb 14	vs. Michigan State		Surprise Stadium • Surprise, AZ	W 4–3 (10)	2–0	–
3	Feb 15	vs. New Mexico		Surprise Stadium • Surprise, AZ	L 4–7	2–1	–
4	Feb 16	vs. New Mexico		Surprise Stadium • Surprise, AZ	L 2–5	2–2	–
5	Feb 19	vs. No. 10 Oklahoma State		Surprise Stadium • Surprise, AZ	W 5–3	3–2	–
6	Feb 20	vs. Kansas State		Surprise Stadium • Surprise, AZ	W 10–9	4–2	–
7	Feb 21	vs. Oklahoma		Surprise Stadium • Surprise, AZ	L 6–9	4–3	–
8	Feb 22	vs. Kansas		Surprise Stadium • Surprise, AZ	W 15–5	5–3	–
9	Feb 27	Grambling State		Goss Stadium • Corvallis, OR	W 10–7	6–3	–
10	Feb 28	Grambling State		Goss Stadium • Corvallis, OR	W 25–3	7–3	–
11	Feb 28	Grambling State		Goss Stadium • Corvallis, OR	W 9–2	8–3	–

March (13–4)

#	Date	Opponent	Rank	Site/stadium	Score	Overall record	Pac-12 record
12	Mar 4	at Portland		Joe Etzel Field • Portland, OR	W 14–2	9–3	–
13	Mar 6	Fresno State		Goss Stadium • Corvallis, OR	W 2–1	10–3	–
14	Mar 7	Fresno State		Goss Stadium • Corvallis, OR	W 5–2	11–3	–
15	Mar 7	Fresno State		Goss Stadium • Corvallis, OR	W 12–2	12–3	–
16	Mar 8	Fresno State		Goss Stadium • Corvallis, OR	W 2–1	13–3	–
17	Mar 10	Portland	No. 24	Goss Stadium • Corvallis, OR	W 12–3	14–3	–
18	Mar 13	at No. 14 Arizona State	No. 24	Phoenix Municipal Stadium • Phoenix, AZ	W 1–0	15–3	1–0
19	Mar 14	at No. 14 Arizona State	No. 24	Phoenix Municipal Stadium • Phoenix, AZ	L 3–4	15–4	1–1
20	Mar 15	at No. 14 Arizona State	No. 24	Phoenix Municipal Stadium • Phoenix, AZ	L 4–7	15–5	1–2
21	Mar 20	Washington State	No. 25	Goss Stadium • Corvallis, OR	W 5–2	16–5	2–2
22	Mar 21	Washington State	No. 25	Goss Stadium • Corvallis, OR	W 3–0	17–5	3–2
23	Mar 22	Washington State	No. 25	Goss Stadium • Corvallis, OR	W 2–1 (11)	18–5	4–2
24	Mar 24	San Jose State	No. 19	Goss Stadium • Corvallis, OR	W 6–1	19–5	–
25	Mar 25	San Jose State	No. 19	Goss Stadium • Corvallis, OR	W 8–2	20–5	–
26	Mar 27	Cal Poly	No. 19	Goss Stadium • Corvallis, OR	L 1–8	20–6	–
27	Mar 28	Cal Poly	No. 19	Goss Stadium • Corvallis, OR	L 2–7	20–7	–
28	Mar 29	Cal Poly	No. 19	Goss Stadium • Corvallis, OR	W 4–2	21–7	–

April (7–6)

#	Date	Opponent	Rank	Site/stadium	Score	Overall record	Pac-10 record
29	Apr 2	at No. 4 UCLA	No. 18	Jackie Robinson Stadium • Los Angeles, CA	W 3–2	22–7	5–2
30	Apr 3	at No. 4 UCLA	No. 18	Jackie Robinson Stadium • Los Angeles, CA	L 1–4	22–8	5–3
31	Apr 4	at No. 4 UCLA	No. 18	Jackie Robinson Stadium • Los Angeles, CA	L 5–10	22–9	5–4
32	Apr 10	at Oregon	No. 20	PK Park • Eugene, OR	L 2–3	22–10	5–5
33	Apr 11	at Oregon	No. 20	PK Park • Eugene, OR	W 4–2	23–10	6–5
34	Apr 12	at Oregon	No. 20	PK Park • Eugene, OR	L 9–10	23–11	6–6
	Apr 14	vs. Portland	No. 20	Volcanoes Stadium • Keizer, OR	Postponed to May 13		
35	Apr 17	Arizona	No. 20	Goss Stadium • Corvallis, OR	W 3–1	24–11	7–6
36	Apr 18	Arizona	No. 20	Goss Stadium • Corvallis, OR	L 1–3	24–12	7–7
37	Apr 19	Arizona	No. 20	Goss Stadium • Corvallis, OR	W 5–3	25–12	8–7
38	Apr 24	No. 11 USC	No. 20	Goss Stadium • Corvallis, OR	L 3–11	25–13	8–8
39	Apr 25	No. 11 USC	No. 20	Goss Stadium • Corvallis, OR	W 3–2	26–13	9–8
40	Apr 26	No. 11 USC	No. 20	Goss Stadium • Corvallis, OR	W 9–6	27–13	10–8
41	Apr 30	at Washington	No. 18	Husky Ballpark • Seattle, WA	W 4–2 (10)	28–13	11–8

May (10–3–1)

#	Date	Opponent	Rank	Site/stadium	Score	Overall record	Pac-10 record
42	May 1	at Washington	No. 18	Husky Ballpark • Seattle, WA	L 6–8	28–14	11–9
43	May 2	at Washington	No. 18	Husky Ballpark • Seattle, WA	W 4–1	29–14	12–9
44	May 5	Oregon	No. 19	Goss Stadium • Corvallis, OR	W 10–2	30–14	–
45	May 8	Utah	No. 19	Goss Stadium • Corvallis, OR	W 3–0	31–14	13–9
46	May 9	Utah	No. 19	Goss Stadium • Corvallis, OR	W 2–0	32–14	14–9
47	May 10	Utah	No. 19	Goss Stadium • Corvallis, OR	T 2–2 (15)	32–14–1	14–9–1
48	May 13	vs. Portland	No. 18	Volcanoes Stadium • Keizer, OR	W 20–0	33–14–1	–
49	May 15	at Stanford	No. 18	Sunken Diamond • Stanford, CA	W 5–2	34–14–1	15–9–1
50	May 16	at Stanford	No. 18	Sunken Diamond • Stanford, CA	W 7–5	35–14–1	16–9–1
51	May 17	at Stanford	No. 18	Sunken Diamond • Stanford, CA	W 12–3	36–14–1	17–9–1
52	May 19	Oregon	No. 11	Goss Stadium • Corvallis, OR	L 2–3 (11)	36–15–1	–
53	May 22	No. 16 California	No. 11	Goss Stadium • Corvallis, OR	W 4–0	37–15–1	18–9–1
54	May 23	No. 16 California	No. 11	Goss Stadium • Corvallis, OR	W 9–0	38–15–1	19–9–1
55	May 24	No. 16 California	No. 11	Goss Stadium • Corvallis, OR	L 3–7	38–16–1	19–10–1

Postseason (1–2)
NCAA tournament: Corvallis Regional (1–2)

#	Date	Opponent	Seed/Rank	Site/stadium	Score	Overall record	NCAAT record
56	May 29	vs. (3) No. 30 Texas	(2) No. 12	Horner Ballpark • Dallas, TX	W 5–4	39–16–1	1–0
	May 30	vs. (4) VCU	(2) No. 12	Horner Ballpark • Dallas, TX	Postponed to May 31 (weather)		
57	May 31	vs. (4) VCU	(2) No. 12	Horner Ballpark • Dallas, TX	L 1–5	39–17–1	1–1
58	May 31	at (1) No. 24 Dallas Baptist	(2) No. 12	Horner Ballpark • Dallas, TX	L 1–7	39–18–1	1–2

== Ranking movements ==
Ranking movements Legend: ██ Increase in ranking ██ Decrease in ranking
	Week																			
Poll	Pre	1	2	3	4	5	6	7	8	9	10	11	12	13	14	15	16	17	18	Final
Coaches'		*			24		25							23	20	18				
Baseball America														23	23	17				
Collegiate Baseball^					24	25	19	18	20	20	20	18	19	18	11	12				
NCBWA†					30	30	27					29	24	22	20	18				

^ Collegiate Baseball ranked 40 teams in their preseason poll, but only ranked 30 teams weekly during the season.
† NCBWA ranks 30 teams in their preseason poll, but only ranks 25 teams weekly during the season.
* A new poll was not released for this week, so for comparison purposes, the previous week's ranking is inserted in this week's slot.
