= 2015 NCAA Division I baseball rankings =

2015 NCAA Division I baseball season
- Duration: February 13, 2015 – June 24, 2015
- Number of teams: 301
- Preseason No. 1: Vanderbilt (Unanimous)

Tournament
- Duration: May 29 – June 24, 2015
- Most conference bids: SEC / ACC (7)

College World Series
- Champions: Virginia (1st title)
- Runners-up: Vanderbilt
- MOP: Josh Sborz, Virginia

Seasons
- ← 2014 2016 →

The following human polls make up the 2015 NCAA Division I men's baseball rankings. The USA Today/ESPN Coaches Poll is voted on by a panel of 31 Division I baseball coaches. The Baseball America poll is voted on by staff members of the Baseball America magazine. These polls, along with the Perfect Game USA poll, rank the top 25 teams nationally. Collegiate Baseball and the National Collegiate Baseball Writers Association rank the top 30 teams nationally.

== Legend ==
	Increase in ranking
	Decrease in ranking
	Not ranked previous week
Italics	Number of first place votes
(#-#)	Win–loss record
т	Tied with team above or below also with this symbol

== ESPN/USA Today Coaches Poll ==
	Preseason Jan 29	Week 3 Mar 2	Week 4 Mar 9	Week 5 Mar 16	Week 6 Mar 23	Week 7 Mar 30	Week 8 Apr 6	Week 9 Apr 13	Week 10 Apr 20	Week 11 Apr 27	Week 12 May 4	Week 13 May 11	Week 14 May 18	Week 15 May 25	Week 16 June 25	
1.	Vanderbilt (26)	Virginia (10–0) (23)	Virginia (12–1) (16)	TCU (14–2) (18)	LSU (21–3) (21)	Texas A&M (27–2) (14)	Texas A&M (30–2) (18)	Texas A&M (33–3) (31)	LSU (34–6) (26)	LSU (37–7) (30)	LSU (40–8) (31)	LSU (43–8) (31)	LSU (46–9) (30)	LSU (48–10) (27)	Virginia (44-24) (31)	1.
2.	Virginia (4)	Florida (10–1) (3)	TCU (10–2) (6)	LSU (18–2) (3)	Texas A&M (24–1) (7)	TCU (21–4) (8)	Vanderbilt (27–6) (13)	LSU (31–6)	Texas A&M (35–5) (3) т	UCLA (31–9)	Texas A&M (41–7)	Louisville (40–12)	TCU (43–9) (1)	UCLA (42–14)	Vanderbilt (51-21)	2.
3.	TCU (1)	TCU (7–1) (2)	Florida (14–2) (5)	Florida (18–3) (4)	Vanderbilt (19–5) (1)	Vanderbilt (22–6) (8)	LSU (27–5)	UCLA (25–17)	UCLA (28–8) (1) т	Texas A&M (37–7)	Louisville (36–11)	TCU (39–9)	UCLA (40–12)	Florida (44–16) (3)	Florida (52-18)	3.
4.	LSU	Vanderbilt (9–2) (2)	LSU (15–1) (2)	Texas A&M (21–0) (5)	TCU (17–4) (1)	LSU (23–5)	TCU (23–6)	Vanderbilt (28–9)	Louisville (30–9) (1)	Louisville (34–10)	TCU (37–9)	UCLA (36–12)	Louisville (42–14)	TCU (43–11)	TCU (51-15)	4.
5.	Florida	LSU (10–1) (1)	Vanderbilt (11–4)	Vanderbilt (16–4)	Florida (20–5)	Florida (23–6) (1)	UCLA (25–6)	Louisville (27–8)	TCU (30–8)	TCU (34–8)	UCLA (33–11)	Illinois (43–6–1)	Illinois (45–6–1)	Illinois (47–8–1)	LSU (54-12)	5.
6.	Texas	UCLA (10–1)	Oregon (13–2)	South Carolina (17–3)	UCLA (17–5)	UCLA (21–5)	Louisville (24–7)	TCU (26–8)	Florida (31–10)	Vanderbilt (33–12)	Illinois (40–6–1)	Texas A&M (42–9)	Texas A&M (43–10)	Texas A&M (45–11)	Miami (50-17)	6.
7.	Louisville т	Mississippi State (13–0)	Texas A&M (16–0) (1)	Virginia (12–5) (1)	Louisville (18–6)	Louisville (21–7)	USC (25–6)	Florida (28–9)	USC (29–10)	Illinois (36–6–1)	UC Santa Barbara (34–10–1)	Florida (38–14)	Florida (40–15)	Louisville (43–16)	Cal State Fullerton (39-25)	7.
8.	Oklahoma State т	South Carolina (7–2)	South Carolina (12–3)	Rice (15–6)	South Carolina (18–6)	Florida State (22–7)	Florida State (25–8)	Arizona State (23–9)	Illinois (32–6–1)	Florida (33–12)	Vanderbilt (35–14)	Florida State (37–16) т	Miami (FL) (42–13)	Miami (FL) (44–14)	Arkansas (40-25)	8.
9.	UCLA	Oregon (10–2)	UCLA (11–4)	UCLA (14–5)	Florida State (19–6)	USC (22–6)	Arizona State (21–8)	Miami (FL) (28–9)	Vanderbilt (29–12)	UC Santa Barbara (31–10)	Florida (35–13)	Miami (FL) (38–13) т	Vanderbilt (39–17)	Vanderbilt (42–19)	Louisville (47-18)	9.
10.	South Carolina	Texas Tech (9–1)	UCF (14–2)	Oregon (14–6)	USC (19–5)	Arizona State (18–7)	Florida (24–9)	UC Santa Barbara (26–8)	UC Santa Barbara (28–9)	Arizona State (28–12)	Florida State (35–14)	Vanderbilt (36–16)	UC Santa Barbara (39–13–1)	Florida State (41–9)	Texas A&M (50-14)	10.
11.	Houston	Texas A&M (12–0)	Rice (11–6)	Florida State (17–4)	UCF (20–5)	UCF (22–7)	Miami (FL) (24–9)	USC (26–9)	Florida State (30–12)	Florida State (33–13)	Oklahoma State (31–15)	UC Santa Barbara (35–13–1)	Oklahoma State (34–17)	Missouri State (45–10)	Illinois (50-10-1)	11.
12.	Florida State	Texas (8–4)	USC (15–1)	USC (17–3)	Texas (16–8)	Virginia (18–8)	UC Santa Barbara (23–7)	Illinois (28–6–1)	Arizona State (25–11)	USC (30–12)	Miami (FL) (34–13)	Dallas Baptist (39–9)	Dallas Baptist (41–11)	Oklahoma State (37–18)	Missouri State (49-12)	12.
13.	Texas Tech	Houston (8–4)	Mississippi State (14–3)	Louisville (14–6)	Arizona State (15–7)	South Carolina (19–9)	Rice (22–12)	Florida State (26–12)	Miami (FL) (30–11)	Oklahoma State (29–14)	Arizona State (29–15)	Oklahoma State (31–16)	Missouri State (41–10)	UC Santa Barbara (40–15–1)	Florida State (44-21)	13.
14.	Miami (FL)	UCF (10–1)	North Carolina (10–4)	UCF (17–4)	Virginia (14–7)	Miami (FL) (20–9)	Oklahoma State (22–9)	Oklahoma State (24–11)	Florida Atlantic (31–9)	Miami (31–13)	USC (32–14)	Rice (33–16)	Florida State (37–19)	Dallas Baptist (43–13)	Maryland (42-24)	14.
15.	North Carolina	Rice (8–5)	Louisville (10–5)	Texas Tech (14–5)	Rice (16–9)	Rice (19–11)	Illinois (24–6–1)	Florida Atlantic (28–8)	Oklahoma State (21–12)	Florida Atlantic (33–10)	Dallas Baptist (36–9)	Missouri State (38–10)	College of Charleston (41–11)	Houston (42–18)	UCLA (45-16)	15.
16.	Oregon	Miami (FL) (8–4)	Texas Tech (10–4) т	Texas (13–7)	Miami (FL) (18–7)	Oklahoma State (19–8)	Maryland (22–7) т	Rice (23–15)	Dallas Baptist (29–8)	Dallas Baptist (32–9)	Florida Atlantic (35–11)	USC (34–16)	Rice (35–18)	College of Charleston (43–13)	Louisiana (42-23)	16.
17.	Rice	Maryland (7–2)	Texas (10–6) т	Arizona State (12–6)	Maryland (17–4)	UC Santa Barbara (19–7)	Virginia (19–11) т	Dallas Baptist (26–7)	Rice (26–16)	Rice (29–16)	Missouri State (34–10)	Iowa (37–12)	USC (35–17)	USC (37–19)	Dallas Baptist (46-15)	17.
18.	Ole Miss	North Carolina (6–3)	Florida State (13–3)	Miami (FL) (15–6)	Oregon (15–8)	Dallas Baptist (22–3)	UCF (23–8)	Missouri (24–12)	Maryland (27–11)	College of Charleston (32–9)	College of Charleston (35–9)	Arizona State (30–17)	Houston (39–17)	Oregon State (38–16)	Oklahoma State (38-20)	18.
19.	Cal State Fullerton	Florida State (8–3)	Arizona State (9–5)	Florida Atlantic (18–3)	Houston (17–7)	Texas (17–11)	Florida Atlantic (26–6)	UCF (25–12)	Missouri State (27–11)	Iowa (30–11)	Rice (29–16)	College of Charleston (38–10)	Arizona State (32–19)	Arizona State (34–21)	Virginia Commonwealth (40-25)	19.
20.	Maryland	Louisville (7–3)	Miami (FL) (10–6)	Mississippi State (16–6)	UC Santa Barbara (16–6)	Houston (19–9)	Dallas Baptist (24–5)	Coastal Carolina (25–9)	Virginia (24–15)	Missouri State (30–10)	Iowa (33–12)	Florida Atlantic (31–16)	Oregon State (36–14)	Rice (35–20)	College of Charleston (45-15)	20.
21.	Arizona State	Oklahoma State (7–4)	UC Santa Barbara (11–4)	North Carolina (12–7)	Texas Tech (16–8)	Illinois (19–6–1)	South Carolina (21–11)	Missouri State (24–8)	Iowa (26–11)	Maryland (30–13)	Houston (32–16)	Houston (35–17)	Iowa (38–14)	Florida Atlantic (40–17)	UC Santa Barbara (40-17-1)	21.
22.	Stanford	Arizona State (7–4)	Florida Atlantic (14–2)	UC Santa Barbara (13–5)	Illinois (17–5–1)	Arizona (22–6)	Houston (21–11)	Maryland (24–10)	College of Charleston (27–9)	Houston (29–15)	Nevada (38–11)	Nevada (40–12)	Florida Atlantic (38–15)	Radford (43–14)	USC (39-21)	22.
23.	Texas A&M	USC (12–0)	Maryland (8–4)	Maryland (11–4)	Oklahoma State (16–7)	Nebraska (21–7)	Missouri (22–11)	Virginia (21–14)	Missouri (26–14)	Virginia (27–17)	Arkansas (29–18)	Oregon State (32–14)	Nevada (41–13)	Iowa (39–16)	Houston (43-20)	23.
24.	Cal Poly	UC Santa Barbara (8–3)	Oregon State (13–3)	Illinois (14–4–1)	North Carolina (14–9)	Texas Tech (18–10)	Arizona (22–9)	Iowa (23–9)	Texas Tech (25–15)	Texas Tech (27–17)	Virginia (27–18)	Arkansas (30–19)	Arkansas (33–20)	Arkansas (35–22)	Florida Atlantic (42-19)	24.
25.	Mississippi State	Ole Miss (6–4)	Illinois (11–3–1)	Houston (13–7)	Oregon State (18–5)	Maryland (18–7)	Coastal Carolina (23–8)	Nebraska (26–11)	Houston (26–14)	Ohio State (31–10)	California (29–15)	Coastal Carolina (33–16)	Virginia (33–19)	East Carolina (40–20)	Oregon State (39-18)	25.
	Preseason Jan 29	Week 3 Mar 2	Week 4 Mar 9	Week 5 Mar 16	Week 6 Mar 23	Week 7 Mar 30	Week 8 Apr 6	Week 9 Apr 13	Week 10 Apr 20	Week 11 Apr 27	Week 12 May 4	Week 13 May 11	Week 14 May 18	Week 15 May 25	Week 16 June 25	
		Dropped: 19. Cal State Fullerton; 22. Stanford; 24. Cal Poly	Dropped: 13. Houston; 21. Oklahoma State; 25. Ole Miss	Dropped: 24. Oregon State	Dropped: 19. Florida Atlantic; 20. Mississippi State	Dropped: 18. Oregon; 24. North Carolina; 25. Oregon State	Dropped: 19. Texas; 23. Nebraska; 24. Texas Tech	Dropped: 21. South Carolina; 22. Houston; 24. Arizona	Dropped: 19. UCF; 20. Coastal Carolina; 25. Nebraska	Dropped: 23. Missouri	Dropped: 21. Maryland; 24. Texas Tech; 25. Ohio State	Dropped: 24. Virginia; 25. California	Dropped: 25. Coastal Carolina	Dropped: 23. Nevada; 25. Virginia	Dropped: 19. Arizona State; 20. Rice; 22. Radford; 23. Iowa; 25. ECU	

== Baseball America ==
	Preseason Jan 26	Week 1 Feb 16	Week 2 Feb 23	Week 3 Mar 2	Week 4 Mar 9	Week 5 Mar 16	Week 6 Mar 23	Week 7 Mar 30	Week 8 Apr 6	Week 9 Apr 13	Week 10 Apr 20	Week 11 Apr 27	Week 12 May 4	Week 13 May 11	Week 14 May 18	Week 15 May 25	Week 16	Week 17	Week 18	Week 19	
1.	Vanderbilt	Vanderbilt (2–1)	Vanderbilt (4–2)	Vanderbilt (9–2)	LSU (15–1)	LSU (18–2)	LSU (21–3)	Vanderbilt (22–6)	Vanderbilt (27–6)	Texas A&M (33–3)	LSU (34–6)	LSU (37–7)	LSU (40–8)	LSU (43–8)	LSU (46–9)	LSU (48–10)					1.
2.	LSU	LSU (3–0)	LSU (6–1)	LSU (10–1)	Florida (14–2)	Florida (18–3)	Vanderbilt (19–5)	Texas A&M (27–2)	Texas A&M (30–2)	LSU (31–6)	Texas A&M (35–5)	UCLA (31–9)	UCLA (33–11)	UCLA (36–12)	UCLA (40–12)	UCLA (42–14)					2.
3.	Houston	Houston (3–0)	Houston (6–1)	Virginia (10–0)	Virginia (12–1)	TCU (14–2)	Texas A&M (24–1)	LSU (23–5)	LSU (27–5)	UCLA (25–7)	UCLA (28–8)	Texas A&M (37–7)	Texas A&M (41–7)	Louisville (40–12)	Louisville (42–14)	Florida (44–16)					3.
4.	Virginia	Virginia (3–0)	Virginia (7–0)	Florida (10–1)	TCU (10–2)	Vanderbilt (16–4)	Florida (20–5)	Florida (23–6)	TCU (23–6)	Louisville (27–8)	Louisville (30–9)	Louisville (34–10)	Louisville (36–11)	Illinois (43–6)	Illinois (45–6)	Illinois (47–8)					4.
5.	Texas Tech	Texas Tech (4–0)	Texas Tech (8–1)	Texas Tech (9–1)	Vanderbilt (11–4)	Texas A&M (21–0)	TCU (17–4)	TCU (21–4)	Louisville (24–7)	Vanderbilt (28–9)	TCU (30–8)	TCU (34–8)	TCU (37–9)	TCU (39–9)	TCU (43–9)	Vanderbilt (42–19)					5.
6.	Florida	Florida (3–0)	Florida (6–1)	UCLA (10–1)	UCF (14–2)	South Carolina (17–3)	UCF (20–5)	UCF (22–7)	USC (25–6)	TCU (26–8)	Florida (31–10)	Vanderbilt (33–12)	Vanderbilt (35–14)	Florida (38–14)	Florida (40–15)	Missouri State (45–10)					6.
7.	TCU	TCU (3–0)	TCU (6–1)	TCU (7–1)	South Carolina (12–3)	UCF (17–4)	Louisville (18–6)	Louisville (21–7)	UCLA (23–6)	Arizona State (23–9)	Arizona State (25–11)	Arizona State (28–12)	Illinois (40–6)	Vanderbilt (36–16)	Vanderbilt (39–17)	TCU (43–11)					7.
8.	Oklahoma State	Miami (FL) (4–0)	UCLA (6–1)	Houston (8–4)	Oregon (13–2)	USC (17–3)	USC (19–5)	USC (22–6)	Florida State (25–8)	Florida (28–9)	Vanderbilt (29–12)	Illinois (36–6)	Florida State (35–14)	Texas A&M (42–9)	Missouri State (41–10)	Texas A&M (45–11)					8.
9.	Miami (FL)	Oklahoma State (1–2)	Texas (7–2)	Mississippi State (13–0)	USC (15–1)	UCLA (14–5)	UCLA (17–5)	UCLA (21–5)	Arizona State (21–8)	Miami (FL) (28–8)	Illinois (32–6)	Florida State (33–13)	Arizona State (29–15)	Florida State (37–16)	Texas A&M (43–10)	Louisville (43–16)					9.
10.	Texas	Texas (2–2)	Oklahoma State (4–3)	Oklahoma State (7–4)	Texas A&M (16–0)	Rice (15–6)	Florida State (19–6)	Florida State (22–7)	Florida (24–9)	USC (26–9)	USC (29–10)	Florida (33–12)	Florida (35–13)	Missouri State (38–10)	UC Santa Barbara (39–13)	Florida State (41–19)					10.
11.	UCLA	UCLA (3–0)	Miami (FL) (5–3)	Miami (FL) (8–4)	UCLA (11–4)	Louisville (14–6)	Arizona State (15–7)	Arizona State (18–7)	Miami (FL) (24–9)	UC Santa Barbara (26–8)	UC Santa Barbara (28–9)	UC Santa Barbara (31–10)	UC Santa Barbara (34–10)	Dallas Baptist (39–9)	Dallas Baptist (41–11)	Oklahoma State (37–18)					11.
12.	Louisville	Louisville (2–1)	South Carolina (6–1)	South Carolina (7–2)	Rice (11–6)	Texas Tech (14–5)	South Carolina (18–6)	Miami (FL) (20–9)	UCF (23–10)	Illinois (28–6)	Florida State (30–12)	Oklahoma State (29–14)	Oklahoma State (31–15)	UC Santa Barbara (35–13)	Oklahoma State (34–17)	Miami (FL) (44–14)					12.
13.	South Carolina	South Carolina (2–1)	Mississippi State (8–0)	UCF (10–1)	Louisville (10–5)	Florida State (17–4)	Miami (FL) (18–7)	Dallas Baptist (22–3)	UC Santa Barbara (23–7)	Florida State (26–12)	Miami (FL) (30–11)	USC (30–12)	Missouri State (34–10)	Oklahoma State (31–16)	Miami (FL) (42–13)	Houston (42–18)					13.
14.	Mississippi State	Mississippi State (4–0)	Rice (5–3)	Texas (8–4)	Texas Tech (10–4)	Virginia (12–5)	Rice (16–9)	Rice (19–11)	Rice (22–12)	Missouri (24–12)	Missouri (26–14)	Missouri State (30–10)	Dallas Baptist (36–9)	Iowa (37–12)	Houston (39–17)	Dallas Baptist (43–13)					14.
15.	Rice	Rice (2–2)	UCF (7–0)	Rice (8–5)	Mississippi State (14–3)	Oregon (14–6)	Dallas Baptist (18–3)	UC Santa Barbara (19–7)	Oklahoma State (22–9)	Missouri State (24–8)	Missouri State (27–9)	Dallas Baptist (32–9)	USC (32–14)	USC (34–16)	USC (35–17)	USC (37–19)					15.
16.	Maryland	Maryland (3–0)	Maryland (5–1)	Maryland (7–2)	Arizona State (9–5)	Arizona State (12–6)	UC Santa Barbara (16–6)	Virginia (18–8)	Dallas Baptist (24–5)	Dallas Baptist (26–7)	Dallas Baptist (29–8)	Iowa (30–11)	Iowa (33–12)	Arizona State (30–17)	Arizona State (32–19)	UC Santa Barbara (40–15-1)					16.
17.	North Carolina	North Carolina (3–0)	Louisville (3–3)	Louisville (7–4)	North Carolina (10–4)	Miami (FL) (15–6)	Houston (17–7)	Oklahoma State (19–8)	Illinois (24–6–1)	Oklahoma State (24–11)	Oklahoma State (25–12)	Miami (FL) (31–13)	Miami (FL) (34–13)	Miami (FL) (38–13)	Florida State (37–19)	Oregon State (38–16)					17.
18.	Arizona State	Arizona State (2–1)	Arizona State (4–2)	Arizona State (7–4)	Florida State (13–3)	Dallas Baptist (15–2)	Texas Tech (16–8)	South Carolina (19–9)	Coastal Carolina (23–8)	Coastal Carolina (25–9)	Iowa (26–11)	Florida Atlantic (33–10)	Florida Atlantic (35–11)	College of Charleston (39–10)	College of Charleston (41–11)	College of Charleston (43–13)					18.
19.	Kennesaw State	Kennesaw State (2–1)	North Carolina (4–2)	Oregon (10–2)	Miami (FL) (10–6)	UC Santa Barbara (13–5)	Texas (16–8)	Texas Tech (18–10)	Maryland (22–7)	UCF (25–12)	Florida Atlantic (31–9)	College of Charleston (32–9)	College of Charleston (35–9)	Houston (35–17)	Iowa (38–14)	Arizona State (34–21)					19.
20.	Oregon	Oregon (2–1)	Oregon (7–1)	North Carolina (6–3)	Dallas Baptist (10–2)	Mississippi State (16–6)	Virginia (14–7)	Houston (19–9)	Missouri (22–11)	Iowa (23–9)	College of Charleston (27–9)	Missouri (26–18)	Arkansas (29–18)	Arkansas (30–19)	Arkansas (33–20)	Arkansas (35–22)					20.
21.	Florida State	Florida State (3–0)	Kennesaw State (5–2)	Florida State (8–3)	UC Santa Barbara (11–4)	Texas (13–7)	California (18–5)	California (20–7)	Florida Atlantic (26–6)	Florida Atlantic (28–8)	Maryland (27–11)	Maryland (30–13)	Missouri (28–20)	Rice (33–16)	Rice (35–18)	Cal State Fullerton (34–22)					21.
22.	UCF	UCF (3–0)	UC Santa Barbara (6–1)	Texas A&M (12–0)	Texas (10–6)	Houston (13–7)	Oregon (15–8)	Nebraska (21–7)	Virginia (19–11)	College of Charleston (24–8)	Texas Tech (25–15)	North Carolina (29–15)	North Carolina (29–16)	California (31–16)	California (32–17)	Radford (43–14)					22.
23.	Cal State Fullerton	FIU (2–1)	Dallas Baptist (6–1)	Dallas Baptist (6–1)	Cal State Fullerton (9–5)	Georgia Tech (14–5)	Oklahoma State (16–7)	Coastal Carolina (20–7)	California (21–9)	North Carolina (22–14)	North Carolina (24–15)	Arkansas (26–18)	California (29–15)	Oregon State (32–14)	Oregon State (36–14)	East Carolina (40–20)					23.
24.	Clemson	UC Santa Barbara (3–0)	Ole Miss (4–2)	UC Santa Barbara (8–3)	Houston (9–7)	Indiana (13–4)	Indiana (15–5)	Illinois (19–6–1)	Missouri State (20–8)	Maryland (24–10)	Nevada (31–9)	Memphis (29–13)	Auburn (32–17)	Radford (36–14)	Radford (39–14)	Iowa (39–16)					24.
25.	Liberty	Liberty (2–1)	Florida State (4–3)	USC (12–0)	Illinois (11–3–1)	Illinois (14–4–1)	Illinois (17–5–1)	San Diego (16–9)	Iowa (21–7)	Texas Tech (22–14)	Arkansas (24–17)	Ohio State (31–10)	Houston (32–16)	Florida Atlantic (36–14)	Florida Atlantic (38–15)	California (34–19)					25.
	Preseason Jan 26	Week 1 Feb 16	Week 2 Feb 23	Week 3 Mar 2	Week 4 Mar 9	Week 5 Mar 16	Week 6 Mar 23	Week 7 Mar 30	Week 8 Apr 6	Week 9 Apr 13	Week 10 Apr 20	Week 11 Apr 27	Week 12 May 4	Week 13 May 11	Week 14 May 18	Week 15 May 25	Week 16	Week 17	Week 18	Week 19	
		Dropped: 23. Cal State Fullerton; 24. Clemson	Dropped: 23. FIU; 25. Liberty	Dropped: 21. Kennesaw State; 24. Ole Miss	Dropped: 10. Oklahoma State; 16. Maryland	Dropped: 17. North Carolina; 23. Cal State Fullerton	Dropped: 20. Mississippi State; 23. Georgia Tech	Dropped: 19. Texas; 22. Oregon; 24. Indiana	Dropped: 18. South Carolina; 19. Texas Tech; 20. Houston; 22. Nebraska; 25. San Diego	Dropped: 14. Rice; 22. Virginia; 23. California	Dropped: 18. Coastal Carolina; 19. UCF	Dropped: 22. Texas Tech; 24. Nevada	Dropped: 21. Maryland; 24. Memphis; 25. Ohio State	Dropped: 21. Missouri; 22. North Carolina; 24. Auburn	None	Dropped: 21. Rice; 25. Florida Atlantic	None	None	None	None	

== Collegiate Baseball ==
	Preseason Dec 22	Week 1 Feb 16	Week 2 Feb 23	Week 3 Mar 2	Week 4 Mar 9	Week 5 Mar 16	Week 6 Mar 23	Week 7 Mar 30	Week 8 Apr 6	Week 9 Apr 13	Week 10 Apr 20	Week 11 Apr 27	Week 12 May 4	Week 13 May 11	Week 14 May 18	Week 15 May 25	Week 16 June 2	Week 17 June 8	Final June 25	
1.	Vanderbilt	TCU (3–0)	TCU (6–1)	TCU (7–1)	TCU (10–2)	TCU (14–2)	Texas A&M (24–1)	Texas A&M (27–2)	Texas A&M (30–2)	Texas A&M (33–3)	LSU (34–6)	LSU (37–7)	LSU (40–8)	LSU (43–8)	LSU (46–9)	LSU (48–10)	LSU (51–10)	LSU (53-10)	Virginia (44-24)	1.
2.	TCU	Vanderbilt (2–1)	Virginia (7–0)	Virginia (10–0)	LSU (15–1)	Texas A&M (21–0)	LSU (21–3)	TCU (21–4)	Vanderbilt (27–6)	UCLA (25–7)	UCLA (28–8)	UCLA (31–9)	Texas A&M (41–7)	Illinois (43–6–1)	Illinois (45–6–1)	UCLA (42–14)	Illinois (50–8–1)	Florida (49-16)	Vanderbilt (51-21)	2.
3.	Virginia	Virginia (3–0)	LSU (6–1)	LSU (10–1)	Virginia (12–1)	LSU (18–2)	Vanderbilt (19–5)	Vanderbilt (22–6)	UCLA (23–6)	LSU (31–6)	Louisville (30–9)	Louisville (34–10)	Illinois (40–6–1)	Louisville (40–12)	UCLA (40–12)	Illinois (47–8–1)	TCU (47–12)	TCU (49-13)	Florida (52-18)	3.
4.	LSU	LSU (3–0)	Vanderbilt (4–2)	Vanderbilt (9–2)	Texas A&M (16–0)	Florida (18–3)	TCU (17–4)	UCLA (21–5)	LSU (27–5)	Louisville (27–8)	Texas A&M (35–5)	TCU (34–8)	Louisville (36–11)	UCLA (36–12)	TCU (43–9)	TCU (43–11)	Louisville (46–16)	Miami (FL) (49-15)	TCU (51-15)	4.
5.	Oklahoma State	Florida (3–0)	Florida (6–1)	Florida (10–1)	Florida (14–2)	Vanderbilt (16–4)	UCLA (17–5)	LSU (23–5)	Louisville (24–7)	Arizona State (23–9)	Arizona State (25–11)	Texas A&M (37–7)	UCLA (33–11)	TCU (39–9)	Louisville (42–14)	Louisville (43–16)	Miami (FL) (47–15)	Vanderbilt (47-19)	LSU (54-12)	5.
6.	Florida	Houston (3–0)	Houston (6–1)	Texas Tech (9–1)	USC (15–1)	South Carolina (17–3)	Florida (20–5)	Florida (23–6)	TCU (23–6)	Miami (FL) (28–9)	Miami (FL) (30–11)	Arizona State (28–12)	TCU (37–9)	Texas A&M (42–9)	Miami (FL) (42–13)	Miami (FL) (44–14)	Florida (47–16)	Cal State Fullerton (39-23)	Miami (FL) (50-17)	6.
7.	Texas	Texas Tech (4–0)	Texas Tech (8–1)	UCLA (10–1)	Vanderbilt (11–4)	Florida State (17–4)	Florida State (19–6)	Louisville (21–7)	Florida State (25–8)	Vanderbilt (28–9)	TCU (30–8)	Florida State (33–13)	Florida State (35–14)	Miami (FL) (38–13)	Vanderbilt (39–17)	Florida (44–16)	Vanderbilt (45–19)	Arkansas (40-23)	Arkansas (40-25)	7.
8.	Houston	UCLA (3–0)	UCLA (6–1)	Mississippi State (13–0)	Oregon (13–2)	USC (17–3)	UCF (20–5)	Florida State (22–7)	Arizona State (21–8)	TCU (26–8)	Florida State (30–12)	Illinois (36–6–1)	Miami (FL) (34–13)	Florida State (37–16)	Texas A&M (43–10)	Vanderbilt (42–19)	Texas A&M (49–12)	Virginia (39-22)	Cal State Fullerton (39-25)	8.
9.	Texas Tech	Arizona State (2–1)	Arizona State (4–3)	Oregon (10–2)	UCF (14–2)	UCLA (14–5)	Arizona State (15–7)	Arizona State (18–7)	Oklahoma State (22–9)	Florida State (26–12)	Oklahoma State (25–12)	Vanderbilt (33–12)	California (29–15)	Florida (38–14)	Florida (40–15)	Texas A&M (45–11)	Florida State (44–19)	Illinois (50-10-1)	Illinois (50-10-1)	9.
10.	UCLA	Oklahoma State (1–2)	Oklahoma State (4–3)	UCF (10–1)	South Carolina (12–3)	UCF (17–4)	Texas (16–8)	UCF (22–7)	USC (25–6)	Oklahoma State (24–11)	Florida (31–10)	Miami (FL) (31–13)	Arizona State (29–15)	Vanderbilt (36–16)	Florida State (37–19)	Florida State (41–19)	Missouri State (48–10)	Louisville (47-18)	Louisville (47-18)	10.
11.	Florida State	Florida State (3–0)	Texas (7–2)	Texas A&M (12–0)	Florida State (13–3)	Arizona State (12–6)	Louisville (18–6)	Oklahoma State (19–8)	Miami (FL) (24–9)	UC Santa Barbara (26–8)	USC (29–10)	Oklahoma State (29–14)	Vanderbilt (35–14)	California (31–16)	Oregon State (36–14–1)	Missouri State (45–10)	Cal State Fullerton (37–22)	Texas A&M (50-14)	Texas A&M (50-14)	11.
12.	Louisville	Texas (2–2)	Rice (5–3)	Houston (8–4)	Cal State Fullerton (9–5)	Virginia (12–5)	Oklahoma State (16–7)	California (20–7)	UC Santa Barbara (23–7)	Florida (28–9)	UC Santa Barbara (28–9)	Florida (33–12)	Oklahoma State (31–14)	Arizona State (30–17)	Arizona State (32–19)	Oregon State (38–16–1)	Arkansas (38–22)	Florida State (44-21)	Florida State (44-21)	12.
13.	Cal Poly	Rice (2–2)	Oregon (7–1)	Arizona State (7–4)	UCLA (11–4)	Texas Tech (14–5)	South Carolina (18–6)	Arizona (22–6)	UCF (23–10)	USC (26–9)	Illinois (32–6–1)	California (26–14)	UC Santa Barbara (34–10–1)	Iowa (37–12)	Missouri State (41–10)	Cal State Fullerton (34–22)	Virginia (37–22)	Missouri State (49-12)	Missouri State (49-12)	13.
14.	Miami (FL)	Miami (FL) (4–0)	Mississippi State (8–0)	Oklahoma State (7–4)	Arizona State (9–5)	Texas (13–7)	California (18–5)	Houston (19–9)	California (21–9)	Iowa (23–9)	Vanderbilt (29–12)	UC Santa Barbara (31–10)	Florida (35–13)	Oklahoma State (31–16)	Oklahoma State (34–17)	UC Santa Barbara (40–15–1)	Maryland (42–22)	Maryland (42-24)	Maryland (42-24)	14.
15.	Oregon	Louisville (2–1)	South Carolina (6–1)	Texas (8–4)	Texas Tech (10–4)	Rice (15–6)	Houston (17–7)	USC (22–6)	Iowa (21–7)	UCF (25–12)	Missouri (26–14)	Iowa (30–11)	Iowa (33–12)	Missouri State (38–10)	Iowa (38–14)	Oklahoma State (37–18)	VCU (40–23)	VCU (40-25)	VCU (40-25)	15.
16.	UC Santa Barbara	UC Santa Barbara (3–0)	UC Santa Barbara (6–1)	Rice (8–5)	Mississippi State (14–3)	UC Santa Barbara (13–5)	USC (19–5)	Miami (FL) (20–9)	Missouri (22–11)	California (22–11)	California (23–13)	USC (30–12)	Missouri State (34–10)	Dallas Baptist (39–19)	California (32–17)	California (34–19)	Louisiana-Lafayette (42–21)	Louisiana-Lafayette (42-23)	Louisiana (42-23)	16.
17.	Cal State Fullerton	Oregon (2–1)	UCF (7–0)	South Carolina (7–2)	Texas (10–6)	Louisville (14–6)	UC Santa Barbara (16–6)	UC Santa Barbara (19–7)	Florida (24–9)	Missouri (24–12)	Iowa (26–11)	Missouri State (30–10)	Dallas Baptist (36–9)	USC (34–16)	USC (35–17)	USC (37–19)	UCLA (45–16)	UCLA (45-16)	UCLA (45-16)	17.
18.	Stanford	Mississippi State (4–0)	Georgia (5–1)	UC Santa Barbara (8–2)	Rice (11–6)	Illinois (14–4–1)	Miami (FL) (18–7)	Oregon State (21–7)	Illinois (24–6–1)	Illinois (28–6–1)	Missouri State (27–9)	Oregon State (27–13)	USC (34–14)	Oregon State (32–14–1)	Cal State Fullerton (31–22)	Arizona State (34–21)	Oregon State (39–18–1)	Oregon State (39-18-1)	Oregon State (39-18-1)	18.
19.	Arizona State	North Carolina (3–0)	Texas A&M (7–0)	Maryland (7–2)	UC Santa Barbara (11–4)	Oklahoma State (13–6)	Oregon State (18–5)	Nebraska (21–7)	Nevada (26–6)	UC Irvine (21–11)	UC Irvine (23–13)	Dallas Baptist (32–9)	Oregon State (29–14)	Rice (33–16)	UC Santa Barbara (39–13–1)	Houston (42–18)	Oklahoma State (38–20)	Oklahoma State (38-20)	Oklahoma State (38-20)	19.
20.	Mississippi State	South Carolina (2–1)	Maryland (5–1)	USC (12–0)	North Carolina (10–4)	Miami (FL) (15–6)	Arizona (19–6)	Virginia (18–8)	Oregon State (22–9)	Oregon State (23–11)	Oregon State (25–12)	College of Charleston (32–9)	College of Charleston (35–9)	College of Charleston (38–10)	Notre Dame (35–19)	Iowa (39–16)	Iowa (41–18)	Iowa (41-18)	Iowa (41-18)	20.
21.	South Carolina	Baylor (3–0)	North Carolina (4–2)	North Carolina (6–3)	Louisville (10–5)	Georgia Tech (14–5)	Maryland (17–4)	Georgia (18–11)	Maryland (22–7)	Missouri State (24–8)	Maryland (27–11)	Rice (29–16)	Rice (29–16)	Cal State Fullerton (28–21)	Dallas Baptist (41–11)	St. John's (39–14)	St. John's (41–18)	St. John's (41-18)	St. John's (41-18)	21.
22.	Rice	Indiana (2–1)	Florida State (4–3)	Florida State (8–3)	Illinois (11–3–1)	Notre Dame (14–4)	Illinois (17–5–1)	South Carolina (19–9)	Rice (22–12)	Nebraska (26–11)	Dallas Baptist (29–8)	North Carolina (29–15)	Cal State Fullerton (26–20)	UC Irvine (31–17)	College of Charleston (41–11)	Radford (43–14)	Radford (45–16)	Radford (45-16)	Radford (45-16)	22.
23.	Liberty	Stanford (1–2)	Miami (FL) (5–3)	Miami (FL) (8–4)	Oklahoma State (8–6)	Indiana (13–4)	Missouri (18–6)	Texas (17–11)	UC Irvine (18–10)	Oklahoma (24–14)	Oklahoma (26–16)	Ohio State (31–10)	UC Irvine (28–16)	UC Santa Barbara (35–13–1)	Houston (39–17)	Notre Dame (36–21)	California (36–21)	California (36-21)	California (36-21)	23.
24.	North Carolina	Liberty (2–1)	Louisville (3–3)	Louisville (7–4)	Oregon State (13–3)	California (15–4)	Indiana (15–5)	Iowa (17–6)	Arizona (22–9)	Georgia Tech (24–12)	Texas Tech (25–15)	Maryland (30–13)	North Carolina (29–16)	Notre Dame (33–18)	Rice (35–18)	Dallas Baptist (43–13)	USC (39–21)	USC (39-21)	USC (39-21)	24.
25.	College of Charleston	Cal State Fullerton (1–2)	Baylor (5–2)	Notre Dame (10–1)	Miami (FL) (10–6)	Oregon State (15–5)	Virginia (14–7)	Illinois (19–6–1)	Houston (21–11)	Notre Dame (24–10)	Florida Atlantic (31–9)	Oklahoma (29–18)	Florida Atlantic (35–11)	Nevada (40–12)	Nevada (41–13)	College of Charleston (43–13)	UC Santa Barbara (40–17–1)	UC Santa Barbara (40-17-1)	UC Santa Barbara (40-17-1)	25.
26.	Georgia Tech	Illinois (4–0)	Illinois (6–0–1)	Stanford (6–6)	Georgia Tech (11–4)	Missouri (15–4)	Nevada (20–4)	Nevada (23–5)	South Carolina (21–11)	Maryland (24–10)	Notre Dame (26–12)	Florida Atlantic (33–10)	Nevada (38–11)	Houston (35–17)	St. John's (36–14)	Rice (35–20)	Notre Dame (37–23)	Notre Dame (37-23)	Notre Dame (37-23)	26.
27.	Kennesaw State	Maryland (3–0)	Georgia Tech (5–2)	Illinois (8–2–1)	Notre Dame (11–3)	Campbell (17–2)	North Carolina (14–9)	San Diego (16–9)	Nebraska (23–10)	Texas Tech (22–14)	College of Charleston (27–9)	Houston (29–15)	Arkansas (29–18)	Arkansas (30–19)	Radford (39–14)	Florida Atlantic (40–17)	Dallas Baptist (46–15)	Dallas Baptist (46-15)	Dallas Baptist (46-15)	27.
28.	Clemson	Georgia Tech (2–1)	Kennesaw State (5–2)	Georgia Tech (8–3)	Nevada (13–2)	Florida Atlantic (18–3)	Georgia Tech (16–7)	Dallas Baptist (22–3)	Coastal Carolina (23–8)	Houston (23–13)	Houston (26–14)	Texas Tech (27–17)	Houston (32–16)	St. John's (32–14)	Clemson (31–25)	Clemson (32–27)	College of Charleston (45–15)	College of Charleston (45-15)	College of Charleston (45-15)	28.
29.	St. John's	Kennesaw State (2–1)	USC (8–0)	Nevada (9–1)	Florida Atlantic (14–2)	Nevada (15–4)	San Diego (13–8)	Missouri (20–9)	Missouri State (20–8)	Coastal Carolina (25–9)	Nevada (31–9)	Nevada (33–11)	South Alabama (32–17)	South Alabama (34–18)	Virginia (33–19)	Arkansas (35–22)	Rice (35–22)	Rice (35-22)	Rice (35-22)	29.
30.	Kent State	Alabama (3–0)	Nevada (7–0)	Cal State Fullerton (5–5)	Auburn (13–3)	San Diego (10–7)	Nebraska (17–6)	Coastal Carolina (20–7)	College of Charleston (21–7)	College of Charleston (24–8)	Arkansas (24–17)	Arkansas (26–18)	St. John's (28–14)	Radford (36–14)	Arkansas (33–20)	Texas (30–25)	Florida Atlantic (42–19)	Florida Atlantic (42-19)	Florida Atlantic (42-19)	30.
	Preseason Dec 22	Week 1 Feb 16	Week 2 Feb 23	Week 3 Mar 2	Week 4 Mar 9	Week 5 Mar 16	Week 6 Mar 23	Week 7 Mar 30	Week 8 Apr 6	Week 9 Apr 13	Week 10 Apr 20	Week 11 Apr 27	Week 12 May 4	Week 13 May 11	Week 14 May 18	Week 15 May 25	Week 16 June 2	Week 17 June 8	Final June 25	
		Dropped: 13. Cal Poly; 25. College of Charleston; 28. Clemson; 29. St. John's; 30. Kent State	Dropped: 22. Indiana; 23. Stanford; 24. Liberty; 25. Cal State Fullerton; 30. Alabama	Dropped: 18. Georgia; 25. Baylor; 28. Kennesaw State	Dropped: 12. Houston; 19. Maryland; 26. Stanford	Dropped: 8. Oregon; 12. Cal State Fullerton; 16. Mississippi State; 20. North Carolina; 30. Auburn	Dropped: 13. Texas Tech; 15. Rice; 22. Notre Dame; 27. Campbell; 28. Florida Atlantic	Dropped: 21. Maryland; 24. Indiana; 27. North Carolina; 28. Georgia Tech	Dropped: 20. Virginia; 21. Georgia; 23. Texas; 27. San Diego; 28. Dallas Baptist	Dropped: 19. Nevada; 22. Rice; 24. Arizona; 26. South Carolina	Dropped: 22. Nebraska; 24. Georgia Tech; 29. Coastal Carolina	Dropped: 15. Missouri; 19. UC Irvine; 26. Notre Dame	Dropped: 23. Ohio State; 24. Maryland; 25. Oklahoma; 28. Texas Tech	Dropped: 24. North Carolina; 25. Florida Atlantic	Dropped: 22. UC Irvine; 29. South Alabama	Dropped: 25. Nevada; 29. Virginia	Dropped: 18. Arizona State; 19. Houston; 28. Clemson; 30. Texas	None	None	

The Preseason poll ranked the top 40 teams in the nation. Teams not listed above were: 31. Ball State; 32. Wichita State; 33. Tennessee; 34. San Diego; 35. Loyola Marymount; 36. Arkansas; 37. Maryland; 38. Nebraska; 39. UC Irvine; 40. Illinois.

== NCBWA ==
	Preseason Feb 9	Week 1 Feb 16	Week 2 Feb 23	Week 3 Mar 2	Week 4 Mar 9	Week 5 Mar 16	Week 6 Mar 23	Week 7 Mar 30	Week 8 Apr 6	Week 9 Apr 13	Week 10 Apr 20	Week 11 Apr 27	Week 12 May 4	Week 13 May 11	Week 14 May 18	Week 15 May 25	Week 16 June 2	Final June 25	
1.	Vanderbilt	Virginia (3–0)	Virginia (7–0)	Virginia (10–0)	Virginia (12–1)	TCU (14–2)	LSU (21–3)	Vanderbilt (22–6)	Vanderbilt (27–6)	Texas A&M (33–3)	LSU (34–6)	LSU (37–7)	LSU (40–8)	LSU (43–8)	LSU (46–9)	LSU (48–10)	LSU (51–10)	Virginia (44–24)	1.
2.	Virginia	TCU (3–0)	TCU (6–1)	TCU (7–1)	TCU (10–2)	LSU (18–2)	Vanderbilt (19–5)	Texas A&M (27–2)	Texas A&M (30–2)	LSU (31–6)	UCLA (28–8)	UCLA (31–9)	Louisville (36–11)	Louisville (40–12)	TCU (43–9)	UCLA (42–14)	Florida (47–16)	Vanderbilt (51-21)	2.
3.	TCU	Vanderbilt (2–1)	Florida (6–1)	Florida (10–1)	LSU (15–1)	Florida (18–3)	Texas A&M (24–1)	TCU (21–4)	LSU (27–5)	UCLA (25–7)	Texas A&M (35–5)	Louisville (34–10)	TCU (37–9)	TCU (39–9)	UCLA (40–12)	Florida (44–16)	Illinois (50–8–1)	Florida (52-18)	3.
4.	LSU	LSU (3–0)	LSU (6–1)	LSU (10–1)	Florida (14–2)	Vanderbilt (16–4)	TCU (17–4)	UCLA (21–5)	UCLA (23–6)	Louisville (27–8)	Louisville (30–9)	TCU (34–8)	Texas A&M (41–7)	UCLA (36–12)	Illinois (45–6–1)	Illinois (47–8–1)	TCU (47–12)	TCU (51-15)	4.
5.	Florida	Florida (3–0)	Vanderbilt (4–2)	Vanderbilt (9–2)	Oregon (13–2)	Texas A&M (21–0)	UCLA (17–5)	LSU (23–5)	TCU (23–6)	Vanderbilt (28–9)	Florida (31–10)	Texas A&M (37–7)	UCLA (33–11)	Illinois (43–6–1)	Louisville (42–14)	TCU (43–11)	Louisville (46–16)	LSU (54-12)	5.
6.	Texas	Houston (3–0)	Houston (6–1)	UCLA (10–1)	Vanderbilt (11–4)	South Carolina (17–3)	Florida (20–5)	Florida (23–6)	Louisville (24–7)	Florida (28–9)	TCU (30–8)	UC Santa Barbara (31–10)	UC Santa Barbara (34–10–1)	Texas A&M (42–9)	Florida (40–15)	Texas A&M (45–11)	Texas A&M (49–12)	Miami (FL) (50-17)	6.
7.	Houston	UCLA (3–0)	UCLA (6–1)	Texas Tech (9–1)	South Carolina (12–3)	UCLA (14–5)	South Carolina (18–6)	Louisville (21–7)	USC (25–6)	TCU (26–8)	UC Santa Barbara (28–9)	Vanderbilt (33–12)	Illinois (30–6–1)	Florida (38–14)	Texas A&M (43–10)	Louisville (43–16)	Vanderbilt (45–19)	Cal State Fullerton (39-25)	7.
8.	Oklahoma State	Texas Tech (4–0)	Texas (7–2)	Oregon (10–2)	Texas A&M (16–0)	Rice (15–6)	Louisville (18–6)	Florida State (22–7)	Florida State (25–8)	Arizona State (23–9)	USC (29–10)	Illinois (36–6–11)	Florida (35–13)	UC Santa Barbara (35–13–1)	UC Santa Barbara (39–13–1)	Miami (FL) (44–14)	Miami (FL) (47–15)	Arkansas (40-25)	8.
9.	UCLA	Texas (2–2)	Texas Tech (8–1)	Mississippi State (13–0)	UCLA (11–4)	Virginia (12–5)	UCF (20–5)	Virginia (18–8)	Arizona State (21–8)	Miami (FL) (28–9)	Vanderbilt (29–12)	Florida (33–12)	Vanderbilt (35–14)	Florida State (37–16)	Miami (FL) (42–13)	Vanderbilt (42–19)	Missouri State (48–10)	Louisville (47-18)	9.
10.	Louisville	Louisville (2–1)	South Carolina (6–1)	South Carolina (7–2)	Rice (11–6)	Texas Tech (14–5)	Florida State (19–6)	USC (22–6)	Florida (24–9)	UC Santa Barbara (26–8)	Illinois (32–6–1)	Arizona State (28–12)	Florida State (35–14)	Miami (FL) (38–13)	Vanderbilt (39–17)	Missouri State (45–10)	Florida State (44–19)	Texas A&M (50-14)	10.
11.	South Carolina	Miami (FL) (4–0)	Rice (5–3)	Rice (8–5)	North Carolina (10–4)	Oregon (14–6)	Texas (16–8)	UCF (22–7)	Miami (FL) (24–9)	USC (26–9)	Arizona State (25–11)	Florida State (33–13)	Oklahoma State (31–15)	Vanderbilt (36–16)	Oklahoma State (34–17)	Oklahoma State (37–18)	Arkansas (38–22)	Illinois (50-10-1)	11.
12.	Texas Tech	South Carolina (2–1)	Oregon (7–1)	Houston (8–4)	UCF (14–2)	Florida State (17–4)	Virginia (14–7)	Arizona State (18–7)	Rice (22–12)	Illinois (28–6–1)	Florida State (30–12)	USC (30–12)	Florida Atlantic (35–11)	Dallas Baptist (39–9)	Dallas Baptist (41–11)	Florida State (41–19)	UCLA (45–16)	Missouri State (49-12)	12.
13.	Miami (FL)	North Carolina (3–0)	Miami (FL) (5–3)	Texas (8–4)	Texas Tech (10–4)	USC (17–3)	USC (19–5)	South Carolina (19–9)	Oklahoma State (22–9)	Florida State (26–12)	Miami (FL) (30–11)	Oklahoma State (29–14)	Miami (FL) (34–13)	Rice (33–16)	College of Charleston (41–11)	UC Santa Barbara (40–15–1)	Cal State Fullerton (37–22)	Florida State (44-21)	13.
14.	North Carolina	Rice (2–2)	North Carolina (4–2)	Texas A&M (12–0)	USC (15–1)	Texas (13–7)	Rice (16–9)	Rice (19–11)	UC Santa Barbara (23–7)	Oklahoma State (24–11)	Florida Atlantic (31–9)	Florida Atlantic (33–10)	USC (32–14)	Oklahoma State (31–16)	Missouri State (41–10)	Dallas Baptist (43–13)	Virginia (37–22)	Maryland (42-24)	14.
15.	Rice	Florida State (3–0)	Mississippi State (8–0)	Miami (FL) (8–4)	Mississippi State (14–3)	UCF (17–4)	Miami (FL) (18–7)	Miami (FL) (20–9)	Virginia (19–11)	Florida Atlantic (28–8)	Oklahoma State (25–12)	Rice (29–16)	Dallas Baptist (36–9)	College of Charleston (38–10)	Rice (35–18)	College of Charleston (43–13)	Maryland (42–22)	UCLA (45-16)	15.
16.	Florida State	Oklahoma State (1–2)	Oklahoma State (4–3)	North Carolina (6–3)	Texas (10–6)	Louisville (14–6)	Arizona State (15–7)	Dallas Baptist (22–3)	UCF (23–10)	Rice (23–15)	Rice (26–16)	Miami (FL) (31–13)	Arizona State (29–15)	USC (34–16)	Florida State (37–19)	Houston (42–18)	Louisiana (42–21)	Louisiana (42-23)	16.
17.	Oregon	Arizona State (2–1)	Louisville (3–3)	Oklahoma State (7–4)	Florida State (13–3)	Miami (FL) (15–6)	Texas Tech (16–8)	Oklahoma State (19–8)	Florida Atlantic (26–6)	Dallas Baptist (26–7)	Dallas Baptist (29–8)	Dallas Baptist (32–9)	Rice (29–16)	Missouri State (38–10)	USC (35–17)	USC (37–19)	Dallas Baptist (46–15)	VCU (40-25)	17.
18.	Cal State Fullerton	Oregon (2–1)	Maryland (5–1)	UCF (10–1)	Louisville (10–5)	North Carolina (12–7)	Oregon (15–8)	Texas (17–11)	Illinois (24–6–1)	UCF (25–12)	Texas Tech (25–15)	College of Charleston (32–9)	College of Charleston (35–9)	Iowa (37–12)	Houston (39–17)	Oregon State (38–16–1)	VCU (40–23)	Dallas Baptist (46-15)	18.
19.	Ole Miss	Maryland (3–0)	Texas A&M (7–0)	Louisville (7–4)	Miami (FL) (10–6)	Arizona State (12–6)	Houston (17–7)	UC Santa Barbara (19–7)	Dallas Baptist (24–5)	Texas Tech (22–14)	Virginia (24–15)	Missouri State (30–10)	Missouri State (34–10)	Florida Atlantic (36–14)	Florida Atlantic (38–15)	Rice (35–20)	Oklahoma State (38–20)	Oklahoma State (38-20)	19.
20.	Maryland	Mississippi State (4–0)	Arizona State (4–3)	Maryland (7–2)	Arizona State (9–5)	Florida Atlantic (18–3)	Maryland (17–4)	Houston (19–9)	South Carolina (21–11)	Coastal Carolina (25–9)	College of Charleston (27–9)	Houston (29–15)	Iowa (33–12)	Arizona State (30–17)	Oregon State (36–15–1)	Florida Atlantic (40–17)	College of Charleston (45–15)	College of Charleston (45-15)	20.
21.	Arizona State	Ole Miss (2–1)	UCF (7–0)	Arizona State (7–4)	Houston (9–7)	Houston (13–7)	Oklahoma State (16–7)	Texas Tech (18–10)	Maryland (22–7)	Virginia (21–14)	Maryland (27–11)	Texas Tech (27–17)	Houston (32–16)	Houston (35–17)	Iowa (38–14)	Arizona State (34–21)	USC (39–21)	USC (39-21)	21.
22.	Mississippi State	Texas A&M (3–0)	Florida State (4–3)	Florida State (8–3)	Florida Atlantic (14–2)	Mississippi State (16–6)	North Carolina (14–9)	Florida Atlantic (22–6)	Houston (21–11)	College of Charleston (24–8)	Houston (26–14)	Virginia (27–17)	Nevada (38–11)	Oregon State (32–14–1)	Arizona State (32–19)	Arkansas (35–22)	Rice (37–22)	Rice (37-22)	22.
23.	Cal Poly	Alabama (3–0)	Ole Miss (4–2)	USC (12–0)	UC Santa Barbara (11–4)	Oklahoma State (13–6)	Dallas Baptist (18–3)	Oregon (17–11)	Texas Tech (19–13)	Maryland (24–10)	Missouri State (27–9)	Maryland (30–13)	Arkansas (29–18)	Nevada (40–12)	Arkansas (33–20)	Radford (43–14)	Houston (43–20)	Houston (43-20)	23.
24.	Stanford	Cal State Fullerton (1–2)	Kennesaw State (5–2)	Ole Miss (6–4)	Oklahoma State (8–6)	Dallas Baptist (15–2)	UC Santa Barbara (16–6)	Illinois (19–6–1)	Coastal Carolina (23–8)	Nebraska (26–11)	UCF (26–15)	Iowa (30–11)	Oregon State (29–14)	Arkansas (30–19)	Virginia (33–19)	Iowa (39–16)	UC Santa Barbara (40–17–1)	California (36-21)	24.
25.	Texas A&M	Kennesaw State (2–1)	Alabama (4–2)	Florida Atlantic (9–2)	Maryland (8–4)	Maryland (11–4)	Florida Atlantic (20–5)	Arizona (22–6)	Texas (17–15)	Houston (23–13)	Coastal Carolina (27–12)	Coastal Carolina (30–13)	Texas Tech (29–20)	Maryland (35–17)	Nevada (41–13)	Coastal Carolina (38–19)	California (36–21)	UC Santa Barbara (40-17-1)	25.
26.	Kennesaw State	UCF (3–0)	UC Santa Barbara (6–1)	UC Santa Barbara (8–3)	Dallas Baptist (10–2)	UC Santa Barbara (13–5)	Illinois (17–5–1)	North Carolina (16–11)	College of Charleston (21–7)	Missouri State (24–8)	Nebraska (29–13)	Ohio State (31–10)	Coastal Carolina (32–15)	Coastal Carolina (33–16)	California (32–17)	Oregon (37–23)	Florida Atlantic (42–19)	Florida Atlantic (42-19)	26.
27.	Clemson	Baylor (3–0)	Illinois (6–0–1)	San Diego State (11–1)	Arizona (15–4)	Illinois (14–4–1)	Oregon State (18–5)	Nebraska (21–7)	Nevada (26–6)	South Carolina (23–14)	South Carolina (25–16)	North Carolina (29–15)	Virginia (27–18)	Virginia (29–19)	Coastal Carolina (35–18)	California (34–19)	Oregon State (39–18–1)	Oregon State (39-18-1)	27.
28.	Alabama	Arkansas (3–0)	Baylor (5–2)	Alabama (7–4)	San Diego State (13–3)	Indiana (13–4)	California (18–5)	Maryland (18–7)	San Diego State (24–8)	Iowa (23–19)	Nevada (31–9)	Nevada (33–11)	Maryland (32–16)	California (31–16)	Radford (39–14)	East Carolina (40–20)	Radford (45–16)	Iowa (41-18)	28.
29.	Tennessee	Indiana (2–1)	Dallas Baptist (6–1)	Dallas Baptist (6–1)	Illinois (11–3–1)	California (15–4)	Mississippi State (18–5)	San Diego State (22–6)	Iowa (21–7)	Georgia Tech (24–12)	Iowa (26–11)	Oregon State (27–13)	California (29–15)	Texas Tech (29–20)	Oregon (34–22)	Cal State Fullerton (34–22)	Iowa (41–18)	Radford (45-16)	29.
30.	Liberty	Liberty (2–1)	Florida Atlantic (6–1)	Tulane (10–2)	Oregon State (13–3)	Oregon State (15–5)	Indiana (15–5)	California (20–7)	Nebraska (23–1)	Missouri (24–12)	Missouri (26–14)	Arkansas (26–18)	Auburn (32–17)	UC Irvine (31–17)	North Florida (42–14)	Virginia (34–22)	Arizona State (35–23)	Arizona State (35-23)	30.
	Preseason Feb 9	Week 1 Feb 16	Week 2 Feb 23	Week 3 Mar 2	Week 4 Mar 9	Week 5 Mar 16	Week 6 Mar 23	Week 7 Mar 30	Week 8 Apr 6	Week 9 Apr 13	Week 10 Apr 20	Week 11 Apr 27	Week 12 May 4	Week 13 May 11	Week 14 May 18	Week 15 May 25	Week 16 June 2	Final June 25	
		Dropped: 23. Cal Poly; 27. Clemson; 29. Tennessee	Dropped: 24. Cal State Fullerton; 28. Arkansas; 29. Indiana; 30. Liberty	Dropped: 24. Kennesaw State; 27. Illinois; 28. Baylor	Dropped: 24. Ole Miss; 28. Alabama; 30. Tulane	Dropped: 27. Arizona; 28. San Diego State	None	Dropped: 27. Oregon State; 29. Mississippi State; 30. Indiana	Dropped: 23. Oregon; 25. Arizona; 26. North Carolina; 30. California	Dropped: 25. Texas; 27. Nevada; 28. San Diego State	Dropped: 29. Georgia Tech	Dropped: 24. UCF; 26. Nebraska; 27. South Carolina; 30. Missouri	Dropped: 26. Ohio State; 27. North Carolina	Dropped: 30. Auburn	Dropped: 25. Maryland; 29. Texas Tech; 30. UC Irvine	Dropped: 25. Nevada; 30. North Florida	Dropped: 25. Coastal Carolina; 26. Oregon; 28. East Carolina	None	

The preseason poll ranked the top 35 teams in the nation. Teams not listed above were: 31. Nebraska; 32. Oregon State; 33. UC Irvine; 34. UCF; 35. College of Charleston.

== Perfect Game USA ==
	Preseason Jan 20	Week 1 Feb 16	Week 2 Feb 23	Week 3 Mar 2	Week 4 Mar 9	Week 5 Mar 16	Week 6 Mar 23	Week 7 Mar 30	Week 8 Apr 6	Week 9 Apr 13	Week 10 Apr 20	Week 11 Apr 27	Week 12 May 4	Week 13 May 11	Week 14 May 18	Week 15 May 25	Final June 26	
1.	Vanderbilt	Vanderbilt (2–1)	Vanderbilt (4–2)	Vanderbilt (9–2)	Florida (14–2)	Florida (18–3)	LSU (21–3)	TCU (21–4)	LSU (27–5)	LSU (31–6)	LSU (34–6)	LSU (37–7)	LSU (40-8)	LSU (43-8)	LSU (46-9)	LSU (48-10)	Virginia (44-24)	1.
2.	Virginia	Virginia (3–0)	Virginia (7–0)	Virginia (10–0)	Virginia (12–1)	TCU (14–2)	TCU (17–4)	LSU (23–5)	TCU (23–6)	Texas A&M (33–3)	Texas A&M (35–5)	Texas A&M (37–7)	Texas A&M (41-7)	Louisville (40-12)	Illinois (45-6-1)	Florida (44-16)	Vanderbilt (51-21)	2.
3.	TCU	TCU (3–0)	Florida (6–1)	Florida (10–1)	TCU (10–2)	LSU (18–2)	Florida (20–5)	Florida (23–6)	Vanderbilt (27–6)	Louisville (27–8)	Louisville (30–9)	Louisville (34–10)	Louisville (36-11)	Illinois (43-6-1)	TCU (43-9)	Illinois (47-18-1)	Florida (52-18)	3.
4.	Florida	Florida (3–0)	UCLA (6–1)	UCLA (10–1)	LSU (15–1)	Vanderbilt (16–4)	Vanderbilt (19–5)	Vanderbilt (22–6)	Texas A&M (30–2)	UCLA (25–7)	UCLA (28–8)	UCLA (31–9)	Illinois (40-6-1)	TCU (39-9)	Louisville (42-14)	UCLA (42-14)	LSU (54-12)	4.
5.	UCLA	UCLA (3–0)	TCU (6–1)	TCU (7–1)	Vanderbilt (11–4)	South Carolina (17–3)	Texas A&M (24–1)	Texas A&M (27–2)	Louisville (24–7)	Arizona State (23–9)	Florida (31–10)	TCU (34–8)	TCU (37-9)	UCLA (36-12)	UCLA (40-12)	Louisville (43-16)	TCU (51-15)	5.
6.	Texas	LSU (3–0)	LSU (6–1)	LSU (10–1)	Oregon (13–2)	Texas A&M (21–0)	Louisville (18–6)	UCLA (21–5)	UCLA (23–6)	Miami (FL) (28–9)	TCU (30–8)	Illinois (36–6–1)	UCLA (33-11)	Florida (38-14)	Florida (40-15)	Miami (44-14)	Miami (50-17)	6.
7.	LSU	Houston (3–0)	Houston (6–1)	Texas Tech (9–1)	South Carolina (12–3)	Virginia (12–5)	UCLA (17–5)	Louisville (21–7)	Florida State (25–8)	Florida (28–9)	Arizona State (25–11)	Arizona State (28–12)	Florida (35-13)	Texas A&M (42-9)	Miami (42-13)	Texas A&M (45-11)	Illinois (50-10-1)	7.
8.	Houston	Texas (2–2)	Texas (7–2)	South Carolina (7–2)	Louisville (10–5)	Louisville (14–6)	South Carolina (18–6)	Florida State (22–7)	Arizona State (21–8)	TCU (26–8)	Miami (FL) (30–11)	Florida (33–12)	Florida State (35-14)	Miami (38-13)	Texas A&M (43-10)	TCU (43-11)	Louisville (47-18)	8.
9.	Louisville	Louisville (2–1)	Texas Tech (8–1)	Oregon (10–2)	UCLA (11–4)	UCLA (14–5)	Florida State (19–6)	Arizona State (18–7)	Miami (FL) (24–9)	Vanderbilt (28–9)	Illinois (32–6–1)	Florida State (33–13)	UC Santa Barbara (34-10-1)	Dallas Baptist (39-9)	Dallas Baptist (41-11)	Missouri State (45-10)	UCLA (45-16)	9.
10.	Miami (FL)	Miami (FL) (4–0)	South Carolina (6–1)	Miami (FL) (8–4)	Texas A&M (16–0)	Miami (FL) (15–6)	Miami (FL) (18–7)	Miami (FL) (20–9)	Florida (24–9)	UC Santa Barbara (26–7)	Florida State (30–12)	UC Santa Barbara (31–10)	Miami (34-12)	Florida State (37-16)	Missouri State (41-10)	Florida State (41-19)	Cal State Fullerton (39-25)	10.
11.	Florida State	Florida State (3–0)	Miami (FL) (5–3)	Louisville (7–4)	Florida State (13–3)	Florida State (17–4)	Oregon State (18–5)	Virginia (18–8)	UC Santa Barbara (23–7)	Illinois (28–6–1)	UC Santa Barbara (28–9)	Vanderbilt (33–12)	Dallas Baptist (36-9)	Oregon State (32-14-1)	Oregon State (36-14-1)	Vanderbilt (42-19)	Arkansas (40-25)	11.
12.	Texas Tech	Texas Tech (4–0)	Louisville (3–3)	Houston (8–4)	North Carolina (10–4)	Oregon (14–6)	Arizona State (15–7)	UCF (22–7)	USC (25–6)	Florida State (26–12)	USC (29–10)	Miami (FL) (31–12)	Vanderbilt (35-14)	Missouri State (38-10)	Vanderbilt (39-17)	Oregon State (38-16-1)	Texas A&M (50-14)	12.
13.	Oklahoma State	South Carolina (2–1)	Oregon (7–1)	Texas (9–3)	Miami (FL) (10–6)	UC Santa Barbara (13–5)	UC Santa Barbara (16–6)	UC Santa Barbara (19–7)	Illinois (24–6–1)	USC (26–9)	Vanderbilt (29–12)	Dallas Baptist (32–9)	Arizona State (29-15)	Iowa (37-12)	Oklahoma State (34-17)	Dallas Baptist (43-13)	Florida State (44-21)	13.
14.	South Carolina	Oregon (2–1)	UC Santa Barbara (7–1)	Mississippi State (13–0)	UC Santa Barbara (11–4)	Texas Tech (14–5)	Virginia (14–7)	Oregon State (21–7)	Virginia (19–11)	Florida Atlantic (28–8)	Florida Atlantic (31–9)	Florida Atlantic (33–10)	Florida Atlantic (35-11)	Vanderbilt (36-16)	Florida State (37-19)	Oklahoma State (37-18)	Missouri State (49-12)	14.
15.	Oregon	Arkansas (3–0)	North Carolina (4–2)	Texas A&M (12–0)	UCF (14–2)	UCF (17–4)	UCF (20–5)	South Carolina (19–9)	Oregon State (22–9)	UCF (25–12)	Dallas Baptist (29–8)	USC (30–12)	Oklahoma State (31-15)	Oklahoma State (31-16)	UC Santa Barbara (39-13-1)	Houston (42-18)	Dallas Baptist (46-15)	15.
16.	Arkansas	North Carolina (3–0)	Florida State (4–3)	Florida State (8–3)	Arkansas (9–3)	Oregon State (15–5)	Texas (16–8)	USC (22–6)	Florida Atlantic (26–6)	Dallas Baptist (26–7)	Virginia (24–15)	Oklahoma State (29–14)	Oregon State (29-14)	Arizona State (30-17)	College of Charleston (41-11)	USC (37-19)	College of Charleston (45-15)	16.
17.	North Carolina	UC Santa Barbara (3–0)	Arkansas (4–2)	North Carolina (6–3)	Oregon State (13–3)	North Carolina (13–6)	Oregon (15–8)	Dallas Baptist (22–3)	UCF (23–10)	Oklahoma State (24–11)	Oklahoma State (25–12)	North Carolina (29–15)	USC (32-14)	USC (34-16)	USC (35-17)	Radford (43-14)	Houston (43-20)	17.
18.	UC Santa Barbara	Arizona State (2–1)	Mississippi State (8–0)	UC Santa Barbara (8–3)	Texas Tech (10–4)	Texas (13–7)	North Carolina (14–9)	North Carolina (16–11)	Dallas Baptist (24–5)	North Carolina (24–11)	North Carolina (24–15)	Oregon State (27–13)	Missouri State (32-10)	College of Charleston (38-10)	Iowa (38-14)	Cal State Fullerton (34-22)	Oregon State (39-19-1)	18.
19.	Cal State Fullerton	Oklahoma State (1–2)	Texas A&M (7–0)	UCF (10–1)	Texas (10–6)	Florida Atlantic (18–3)	Houston (17–7)	Houston (19–9)	Oklahoma State (22–9)	Nebraska (26–11)	Oregon State (25–12)	Missouri State (30–10)	Iowa (33-12)	UC Santa Barbara (35-13-1)	Houston (39-17)	College of Charleston (43-3)	USC (39-2)	19.
20.	Arizona State	Rice (2–2)	Rice (5–3)	Arkansas (4–2)	Florida Atlantic (14–2)	Arizona State (12–6)	Florida Atlantic (20–5)	Illinois (19–6–1)	Maryland (22–7)	Virginia (21–14)	Maryland (27–12)	Iowa (30–11)	North Carolina (29-16)	Florida Atlantic (36-14)	Florida Atlantic (38-15)	UC Santa Barbara (40-15-1)	Oklahoma State (38-20)	20.
21.	Rice	Mississippi State (4–0)	Arizona State (4–3)	Rice (8–5)	Houston (9–7)	Houston (13–7)	Illinois (17–5–1)	Nebraska (21–7)	South Carolina (21–11)	Oregon State (23–11)	Missouri State (26–9)	Maryland (30–13)	College of Charleston (35-9)	Nevada (40-12)	Arizona State (32-19)	Iowa (39-16)	Maryland (42-24)	21.
22.	Stanford	Texas A&M (3–0)	UCF (7–0)	Arizona State (7–4)	Mississippi State (14–3)	Rice (15–6)	USC (19–5)	California (20–7)	North Carolina (18–14)	Maryland (24–10)	Nevada (31–9)	Virginia (27–17)	Arkansas (29-18)	Houston (35-17)	Arkansas (33-20)	Arizona State (34-21)	Radford (45-16)	22.
23.	Mississippi State	Kennesaw State (2–1)	Kennesaw State (5–2)	Oregon State (8–3)	USC (15–1)	USC (17–3)	Texas Tech (16–8)	Florida Atlantic (22–6)	Nebraska (23–10)	Missouri State (24–8)	Missouri (26–14)	College of Charleston (32–9)	Nevada (38-11)	Maryland (35-17)	Radford (39-14)	Arkansas (35-22)	UC Santa Barbara (40-17-1)	23.
24.	Kennesaw State	Cal State Fullerton (1–2)	Georgia (5–1)	Maryland (7–2)	Rice (11–6)	Indiana (13–4)	Dallas Baptist (18–3)	Arizona (22–6)	Houston (21–11)	Missouri (24–12)	Iowa (26–11)	Ohio State (31–10)	Houston (32-16)	Arkansas (30-19)	Nevada (41-13)	Oral Roberts (41–14)	Louisiana (42-23)	24.
25.	Texas A&M	Stanford (1–2)	Oregon State (5–3)	Florida Atlantic (9–2)	Arizona State (9–5)	Mississippi State (16–6)	Maryland (17–4)	Texas (17–11)	Iowa (21–7)	Iowa (23–9)	Nebraska (29–12)	Nevada (33–11)	Maryland (32-16)	Rice (33-16)	Rice (35-18)	East Carolina (40–20)	Iowa (41-18)	25.
	Preseason Jan 20	Week 1 Feb 16	Week 2 Feb 23	Week 3 Mar 2	Week 4 Mar 9	Week 5 Mar 16	Week 6 Mar 23	Week 7 Mar 30	Week 8 Apr 6	Week 9 Apr 13	Week 10 Apr 20	Week 11 Apr 27	Week 12 May 4	Week 13 May 11	Week 14 May 18	Week 15 May 25	Final June 26	
		None	Dropped: 19. Oklahoma State; 24. Cal State Fullerton; 25. Stanford	Dropped: 23. Kennesaw State; 24. Georgia	Dropped: 24. Maryland	Dropped: 16. Arkansas	Dropped: 22. Rice; 24. Indiana; 25. Mississippi State	Dropped: 17. Oregon; 23. Texas Tech; 25. Maryland	Dropped: 22. California; 24. Arizona; 25. Texas	Dropped: 21. South Carolina; 24. Houston	Dropped: 15. UCF	Dropped: 23. Missouri; 25. Nebraska	Dropped: 22. Virginia; 24. Ohio State	Dropped: 20. North Carolina	Dropped: 23. Maryland	Dropped: 20. Florida Atlantic; 24. Nevada; 25. Rice	Dropped: 22. Arizona State; 24. Oral Roberts; 25. East Carolina	
