= 2015 Arizona Wildcats baseball team =

2015 Arizona Wildcats baseball
- Conference: Pac-12 Conference
- Record: 31–24 (12–18 Pac-12)
- Head coach: Andy Lopez (14th season)
- Assistant coaches: Matt Siegel (4th season); Michael Lopez (3rd season); Josh Garcia (3rd season)
- Home stadium: Hi Corbett Field

The 2015 Arizona Wildcats baseball team represented the University of Arizona in the 2015 NCAA Division I baseball season. The Wildcats played their home games for the 4th season at Hi Corbett Field. The team was coached by Andy Lopez in his 14th and final season at Arizona.

== Personnel ==
=== Roster ===
2015 Pac-12 Conference baseball standings
	Conf.						Overall
Team	W		L		T	PCT	W		L		T	PCT
No. 2 UCLA ‍†‍‍^{y}	22	–	8	–	0	.733	42	–	14	–	0	.750
No. 12 Oregon State ‍‍‍^{y}	19	–	10	–	1	.650	38	–	16	–	1	.700
No. 16 California ‍‍‍^{y}	18	–	12	–	0	.600	34	–	19	–	0	.642
No. 17 USC ‍‍‍^{y}	18	–	12	–	0	.600	37	–	19	–	0	.661
No. 18 Arizona State ‍‍‍^{y}	18	–	12	–	0	.600	34	–	21	–	0	.618
Oregon ‍‍‍^{y}	16	–	14	–	0	.533	37	–	23	–	0	.617
Washington ‍‍‍	14	–	16	–	0	.467	29	–	25	–	0	.537
Arizona ‍‍‍	12	–	18	–	0	.400	31	–	24	–	0	.564
Washington State ‍‍‍	11	–	19	–	0	.367	29	–	27	–	0	.518
Stanford ‍‍‍	9	–	21	–	0	.300	24	–	32	–	0	.429
Utah ‍‍‍	7	–	22	–	1	.250	16	–	36	–	1	.311
† – Conference champion y – Invited to the NCAA tournament As of May 25, 2015; Rankings from Collegiate Baseball

2015 Arizona Wildcats roster
Pitchers • 19 – Tyger Talley – Junior • 22 – Morgan Earman – Sophomore • 26 – Cody Hamlin – Junior • 29 – Rio Gomez – RS Freshman • 30 – Tyler Crawford – Senior • 33 – Austin Schnabel – Sophomore • 34 – Robby Medel – RS Freshman • 35 – Nathan Bannister – Junior • 36 – Kaleb Roper – Freshman • 37 – Cody Moffett – Junior • 38 – Matt Hartman – Freshman • 39 – Kyle Beadles – Freshman • 40 – Luke Soroko – Sophomore • 43 – Kale Morton – Freshman • 44 – Mathew Troupe – Senior • 47 – Cameron Ming – Freshman • 49 – Xavier Borde – RS Junior	Catchers • 6 – Riley Moore – Senior • 12 – Handsome Monica – Freshman • 16 – Shea Sbranti – Freshman • 17 – Daniel Millwee – Freshman • 50 – Ryan Cooper – Junior Infielders • 1 – Sawyer Gieseke – RS Sophomore • 2 – Kevin Newman – Junior • 3 – Bobby Dalbec – Sophomore • 13 – Cody Ramer – Junior • 14 – Casey Bowman – RS Freshman • 24 – J.J. Matijevic – Freshman • 31 – Michael Hoard – Freshman	Outfielders • 4 – Justin Behnke – Junior • 10 – Tyler Krause – Senior • 15 – Joseph Maggi – Senior • 21 – Ryan Aguilar – Junior • 23 – Zach Gibbons – Junior • 25 – Scott Kingery – Junior • 27 – Elijah Skipps – Freshman • 28 – Ernie De La Trinidad – Freshman • 42 – Jared Oliva – Freshman

=== Coaches ===
2015 Arizona Wildcats baseball coaching staff
- Andy Lopez – Head coach
- Matt Siegel – Assistant coach
- Michael Lopez – Assistant coach
- Josh Garcia – Volunteer Assistant Coach

=== Opening day ===
Opening Day Starters
Name	Position
Scott Kingery	Second baseman
Kevin Newman	Shortstop
Tyler Krause	Designated hitter
Riley Moore	Catcher
Zach Gibbons	Right fielder
J.J. Matijevic	First baseman
Bobby Dalbec	Third baseman
Jared Oliva	Left fielder
Justin Behnke	Center fielder
Austin Schnabel	Starting pitcher

== Schedule and results ==
2015 Arizona Wildcats baseball game log
Regular season
Date	Opponent	Rank	Site/Stadium	Score	Win	Loss	Save	Overall Record	Pac-12 Record
Feb 13	vs Eastern Michigan		Hi Corbett Field • Tucson, AZ	W 7–3	Schnabel (1–0)	Lavoie (0–1)	Hamlin (1)	1–0	
Feb 14	vs Eastern Michigan		Hi Corbett Field • Tucson, AZ	W 16–3	Medel (1–0)	Land (0–1)	None	2–0	
Feb 15	vs Eastern Michigan		Hi Corbett Field • Tucson, AZ	W 6–2	Talley (1–0)	Andrews (0–1)	Dalbec (1)	3–0	
Feb 17	vs North Dakota State		Hi Corbett Field • Tucson, AZ	W 7–2	Hamlin (1–0)	Pfannenstein (0–1)	Bannister (1)	4–0	
Feb 18	vs North Dakota State		Hi Corbett Field • Tucson, AZ	W 11–1	Borde (1–0)	Ernst (0–2)	None	5–0	
Feb 20	vs #17 Rice		Hi Corbett Field • Tucson, AZ	L 5–8	McCanna (1–0)	Schnabel (1–1)	Ditman (2)	5–1	
Feb 21	vs #17 Rice		Hi Corbett Field • Tucson, AZ	W 7–6	Dalbec (1–0)	Ditman (1–1)	None	6–1	
Feb 22	vs #17 Rice		Hi Corbett Field • Tucson, AZ	L 4–6	Orewiler (1–0)	Dalbec (1–1)	None	6–2	
Feb 24	vs Oakland		Hi Corbett Field • Tucson, AZ	W 10–7	Bannister (1–0)	Palm (0–1)	None	7–2	
Feb 25	vs Oakland		Hi Corbett Field • Tucson, AZ	W 13–0	Borde (2–0)	Green (0–2)	None	8–2	
Feb 27	at Samford		Dudy Noble Field • Starkville, MS	W 7–1	Talley (2–0)	Ledford (1–2)	Hamlin (2)	9–2	
Feb 27	at #25 Mississippi State		Dudy Noble Field • Starkville, MS	L 2–4	Brown (3–0)	Schnabel (1–2)	Fitts (4)	9–3	
Feb 28	at #25 Mississippi State		Dudy Noble Field • Starkville, MS	L 2–6	Mitchell (3–0)	Medel (1–1)	None	9–4	
Mar 1	at Samford		Dudy Noble Field • Starkville, MS	W 12–5	Hartman (1–0)	Curry (0–2)	None	10–4	
Mar 3	vs New Mexico State		Hi Corbett Field • Tucson, AZ	W 6–2	Bannister (2–0)	Paulson (0–1)	None	11–4	
Mar 4	vs New Mexico State		Hi Corbett Field • Tucson, AZ	W 10–0	Gomez (1–0)	Kraft (0–2)	None	12–4	
Mar 6	vs Portland		Hi Corbett Field • Tucson, AZ	W 9–4	Hamlin (2–0)	Lockwood (1–2)	None	13–4	
Mar 7	vs Portland		Hi Corbett Field • Tucson, AZ	W 8–4	Dalbec (2–1)	Wilcox (1–1)	None	14–4	
Mar 8	vs Portland		Hi Corbett Field • Tucson, AZ	W 9–6	Bannister (3–0)	Sahlinger (1–1)	Dalbec (2)	15–4	
Mar 13	vs Utah		Hi Corbett Field • Tucson, AZ	W 10–5	Hamlin (3–0)	Helton (1–2)	None	16–4	1–0
Mar 14	vs Utah		Hi Corbett Field • Tucson, AZ	L 4–7	Carroll (3–2)	Medel (1–2)	Rodriguez (2)	16–5	1–1
Mar 15	vs Utah		Hi Corbett Field • Tucson, AZ	L 8–9	Thomas (1–0)	Dalbec (2–2)	None	16–6	1–2
Mar 20	at Stanford		Sunken Diamond • Stanford, CA	W 6–5	Bannister (4–0)	Hanewich (1–2)	Dalbec (3)	17–6	2–2
Mar 21	at Stanford		Sunken Diamond • Stanford, CA	W 6–4	Schnabel (2–2)	Weisenberg (1–2)	Dalbec (4)	18–6	3–2
Mar 22	at Stanford		Sunken Diamond • Stanford, CA	W 6–0	Talley (3–0)	Viall (1–2)	None	19–6	4–2
Mar 27	vs #18 Oregon		Hi Corbett Field • Tucson, AZ	W 7–2	Hamlin (4–0)	Harber (3–1)	Dalbec (5)	20–6	5–2
Mar 28	vs #18 Oregon		Hi Corbett Field • Tucson, AZ	W 9–5	Bannister (5–0)	Peterson (2–3)	None	21–6	6–2
Mar 29	vs #18 Oregon		Hi Corbett Field • Tucson, AZ	W 13–4	Moffett (1–0)	Irvin (1–2)	Borde (1)	22–6	7–2
Apr 2	vs #9 Southern California	#22	Hi Corbett Field • Tucson, AZ	L 1–4	Kriske (2–1)	Hamlin (4–1)	None		
Apr 3	vs #9 Southern California	#22	Hi Corbett Field • Tucson, AZ	L 6–13	Twomey (5–1)	Medel (1–3)	Flores (1)		
Apr 4	vs #9 Southern California	#22	Hi Corbett Field • Tucson, AZ	L 9–10	Huberman (5–1)	Dalbec (2–3)	None		
Apr 11	at #9 Arizona State	#24	Phoenix Municipal Stadium • Phoenix, AZ	L 4–5	Burr (6–0)	Bannister (5–1)	None		
Apr 12	at #9 Arizona State	#24	Phoenix Municipal Stadium • Phoenix, AZ	L 7–13	Kellogg (6–1)	Borde (2–1)	Melbostad (2)		
Apr 12	at #9 Arizona State	#24	Phoenix Municipal Stadium • Phoenix, AZ	W 7–2	Talley (4–0)	Burr (6–1)	None		
Apr 17	at Oregon State		Goss Stadium • Corvallis, OR	L 1–3	Moore (4–1)	Hamlin (4–2)	None		
Apr 18	at Oregon State		Goss Stadium • Corvallis, OR	W 3–1	Bannister (6–1)	Rasmussen (4–3)	Talley (1)		
Apr 19	at Oregon State		Goss Stadium • Corvallis, OR	L 3–5	Eckert (4–0)	Dalbec (2–4)	Hickey (5)		
Apr 22	vs #12 Arizona State		Hi Corbett Field • Tucson, AZ	L 5–6	Hingst (3–1)	Schnabel (2–3)	Burr (12)		
Apr 24	vs California		Hi Corbett Field • Tucson, AZ	L 1–3	Jefferies (5–2)	Hamlin (4–3)	Nelson (6)		
Apr 25	vs California		Hi Corbett Field • Tucson, AZ	L 0–4	Mason (5–2)	Bannister (6–2)	None		
Apr 26	vs California		Hi Corbett Field • Tucson, AZ	L 3–8	Ladrech (6–4)	Dalbec (2–5)	None		
Apr 28	vs #10 Arizona State		Hi Corbett Field • Tucson, AZ	W 17–6	Medel (2–3)	Hingst (3–2)	None		
Apr 27	at Washington State		Bailey-Brayton Field • Pullman, WA	W 14–5	Hamlin (5–3)	Hartnett (3–4)	None		
May 8	at Washington State		Bailey-Brayton Field • Pullman, WA	L 3–5	Triece (4–0)	Bannister (6–3)	Hamilton (11)		
May 9	at Washington State		Bailey-Brayton Field • Pullman, WA	W 2–0	Talley (5–0)	Hamilton (0–3)	None		
May 10	vs Washington		Hi Corbett Field • Tucson, AZ	W 8–6	Hamlin (6–3)	Bremer (5–3)	Talley (2)		
May 9	vs Washington		Hi Corbett Field • Tucson, AZ	L 4–9	Davis (7–5)	Bannister (6–4)	Rallings (3)		
May 10	vs Washington		Hi Corbett Field • Tucson, AZ	L 2–3	Jones (4–6)	Dalbec (2–6)	Rallings (4)		
May 15	at #4 UCLA		Jackie Robinson Stadium • Los Angeles, CA	L 0–1	Berg (6–1)	Talley (5–1)	None		
May 16	at #4 UCLA		Jackie Robinson Stadium • Los Angeles, CA	L 0–6	Watson (8–4)	Bannister (6–5)	None		
May 17	at #4 UCLA		Jackie Robinson Stadium • Los Angeles, CA	L 3–5	Poteet (5–1)	Dalbec (2–7)	Berg (12)		
May 21	vs Abilene Christian		Hi Corbett Field • Tucson, AZ	W 9–0	Gomez (2–0)	Cole (0–3)	None		
May 22	vs Abilene Christian		Hi Corbett Field • Tucson, AZ	L 1–2	deMeyere (4–5)	Hamlin (6–4)	Zotyka (3)		
May 23	vs Hawaii		Hi Corbett Field • Tucson, AZ	W 2–1	Bannister (7–5)	Brashears (8–5)	None		
May 24	vs Hawaii		Hi Corbett Field • Tucson, AZ	W 8–1	Dalbec (3–7)	Arakawa (3–5)	None		

== 2015 MLB draft ==
Player	Position	Round	Overall	MLB team
Kevin Newman	SS	1	19	Pittsburgh Pirates
Scott Kingery	2B	2	48	Philadelphia Phillies
Xavier Borde	LHP	36	1093	Baltimore Orioles
