= 2015 Louisville Cardinals baseball team =

American college baseball season

2015 Louisville Cardinals baseball
- Conference: Atlantic Coast Conference

Ranking
- Coaches: No. 4
- Record: 42–14 (25–5 ACC)
- Head coach: Dan McDonnell (9th season)
- Assistant coaches: Roger Williams (9th season); Eric Snider (1st season); Adam Vrable (1st season)
- Home stadium: Jim Patterson Stadium

2015 Atlantic Coast Conference baseball standings
	Conf.				Overall
Team	W		L	PCT	W		L	PCT
Atlantic
No. 10 Louisville ^{x}‍‍‍^{y}	25	–	5	.833	47	–	18	.723
No. 26 Notre Dame ‍‍‍^{y}	17	–	13	.567	37	–	23	.617
No. 12 Florida State ‍‍‡‍^{y}	17	–	13	.567	44	–	21	.677
Clemson ‍‍‍^{y}	16	–	13	.552	32	–	29	.525
NC State ‍‍‍^{y}	15	–	14	.517	36	–	23	.610
Wake Forest ‍‍‍	12	–	18	.400	27	–	26	.509
Boston College ‍‍‍	10	–	19	.345	27	–	27	.500
Coastal
No. 6 Miami (FL) ^{x}‍‍‍^{y}	22	–	8	.733	50	–	16	.758
No. 1 Virginia ‍‍‍^{y}	15	–	15	.500	44	–	24	.647
North Carolina ‍‍‍	13	–	16	.448	34	–	24	.586
Virginia Tech ‍‍‍	13	–	16	.448	27	–	27	.500
Georgia Tech ‍‍‍	13	–	17	.433	32	–	23	.582
Duke ‍‍‍	10	–	19	.345	31	–	22	.585
Pittsburgh ‍‍‍	9	–	21	.300	20	–	32	.385
x – Division champion ‡ – Tournament champion y – Invited to the NCAA tournament As of June 30, 2015; Rankings from Collegiate Baseball

The 2015 Louisville Cardinals baseball team represented the University of Louisville during the 2015 NCAA Division I baseball season. The Cardinals played their home games at Jim Patterson Stadium as a member of the Atlantic Coast Conference. They were led by head coach Dan McDonnell, in his ninth year at Louisville.

== Previous season ==
In 2014, the Cardinals finished as champions of the American Athletic Conference with a record of 48–15, 19–5 in conference play, in their first and only season in the conference. They qualified for the 2014 American Athletic Conference baseball tournament, and lost in the finals to Houston. They qualified for the 2014 NCAA Division I baseball tournament, and were selected as hosts of the Louisville regional, along with rival Kentucky, Kansas, and Kent State. The Cardinals rolled to three quick wins to win the Louisville Regional and advance to the Super Regional (of which they were hosts) by defeating Kent State 5–0, Kansas 6–3, and Kentucky 4–1. In the Super Regional, Louisville faced off against Kennesaw State, who had won the Tallahassee Regional in their first ever NCAA Tournament appearance. The Cardinals quickly ended any hopes of a further Cinderella run by defeating the Owls, 5–3 and 7–4, which qualified them for the College World Series.

In the College World Series, Louisville first faced off against Vanderbilt, and lost 3–5 to the eventual national champions. In the Cardinals' second game, they faced Texas, and lost 1–4, leading to their elimination from the College World Series.

== Personnel ==
=== Roster ===
2015 Louisville Cardinals roster
Pitchers: 5 – Anthony Kidston – Junior; 6 – Chandler Dale – Freshman; 7 – Butch Baird – Freshman; 13 – Josh Rogers – Sophomore; 15 – Lincoln Henzman – Freshman; 16 – Kyle Funkhouser – Junior; 19 – Kade McClure – Freshman; 20 – Drew Harrington – Sophomore; 22 – Dylan Shoffner – Junior; 25 – Robert Strader – Sophomore; 28 – Brandon Alphin – Senior; 36 – Jonah Philley – Junior; 38 – Brendan McKay – Freshman; 39 – Alex Sears – Freshman; 40 – Sean Leland – Freshman; 43 – Zack Burdi – Sophomore; 44 – Jake Sparger – Sophomore; 45 – Mac Welsh – Freshman	Catchers: 14 – Austin Clemons – Freshman; 30 – Will Smith – Sophomore; 42 – Colby Fitch – Freshman; Infielders: 1 – Sutton Whiting – Senior; 8 – Danny Rosenbaum – Junior; 10 – Drew Ellis – Freshman; 11 – Zach Lucas – Senior; 17 – Nick Solak – Sophomore; 26 – Blake Tiberi – Freshman; 29 – Devin Hairston – Freshman; 31 – Grant Schreiver – Freshman; 34 – Michael Bollmer – Sophomore	Outfielders: 2 – Corey Ray – Sophomore; 4 – Riley Jackson – Freshman; 18 – Mike White – Senior; 24 – Logan Taylor – Sophomore; 33 – Ryan Summers – Freshman; 35 – Colin Lyman – Sophomore; 41 – Jimmy Faul – Junior

=== Coaching staff ===
Name	Position	Seasons at Louisville	Alma mater
Dan McDonnell	Head coach	9	The Citadel (1992)
Roger Williams	Associate head coach	9	East Carolina University (1992)
Eric Snider	Assistant coach	1	University of Northern Iowa (1987)
Adam Vrable	Assistant coach	1	Coastal Carolina University (2006)

== Schedule ==
Legend
	Louisville win
	Louisville loss
	Postponement
**Bold**	Louisville team member

2015 Louisville Cardinals baseball game log
Regular Season
February

Date	Opponent	Rank	Site/stadium	Score	Win	Loss	Save	Attendance	Overall record	ACC Record
February 13	vs. Alabama State	#12	Bright House Field • Clearwater, FL	**W** 5–1	Funkhouser (1–0)	Renda (0–1)	None		1–0	
February 14	vs. South Florida	#12	Bright House Field • Clearwater, FL	**W** 2–0	Harrington (1–0)	Mulholland (0–1)	None		2–0	
February 15	vs. #17 Cal State Fullerton	#12	Bright House Field • Clearwater, FL	**L** 1–2	Gavin (1–0)	Rogers (0–1)	Peitzmeier (1)		2–1	
February 18	Eastern Kentucky	#15	Jim Patterson Stadium • Louisville, KY	Postponed						
February 20	Arkansas State	#15	Tomlinson Stadium • Emerson, GA	**L** 2–8	Owen (1–1)	Funkhouser (1–1)	None		2–2	
February 21	Arkansas State	#15	Tomlinson Stadium • Emerson, GA	**L** 1–4	Zuber (1–0)	Kidston (0–1)	None	475	2–3	
February 21	Arkansas State	#15	Tomlinson Stadium • Emerson, GA	**W** 14–8	McKay (1–0)	Hawkins (1–1)	None	475	3–3	
February 24	Butler	#24	Jim Patterson Stadium • Louisville, KY	**W** 10–1	McClure (1–0)	Nyznyk (0–1)	None	536	4–3	
February 25	Eastern Kentucky	#24	Jim Patterson Stadium • Louisville, KY	**W** 5–2	Harrington (2–0)	Mrox (0–1)	McKay (1)	599	5–3	
February 27	Xavier	#24	Jim Patterson Stadium • Louisville, KY	Postponed						
February 28	Xavier	#24	Jim Patterson Stadium • Louisville, KY	**L** 1–2	Kirschner (2–1)	Funkhouser (1–2)	Bodner (2)	904	5–4	
February 28	Xavier	#24	Jim Patterson Stadium • Louisville, KY	**W** 6–3	Strader (1–0)	Jacknewitz (1–1)	McKay (2)	904	6–4	

March

Date	Opponent	Rank	Site/stadium	Score	Win	Loss	Save	Attendance	Overall record	ACC Record
March 1	Xavier		Jim Patterson Stadium • Louisville, KY							
March 3	Eastern Kentucky		Jim Patterson Stadium • Louisville, KY							
March 6	Miami (FL)		Jim Patterson Stadium • Louisville, KY	Postponed						
March 7	Miami (FL)		Jim Patterson Stadium • Louisville, KY							
March 7	Miami (FL)		Jim Patterson Stadium • Louisville, KY							
March 8	Miami (FL)		Jim Patterson Stadium • Louisville, KY							
March 10	Ole Miss		Jim Patterson Stadium • Louisville, KY							
March 11	Ole Miss		Jim Patterson Stadium • Louisville, KY							
March 13	Boston College		Jim Patterson Stadium • Louisville, KY	Postponed						
March 14	Boston College		Jim Patterson Stadium • Louisville, KY							
March 14	Boston College		Jim Patterson Stadium • Louisville, KY							
March 15	Boston College		Jim Patterson Stadium • Louisville, KY							
March 17	Purdue		Jim Patterson Stadium • Louisville, KY							
March 20	at Notre Dame		Frank Eck Stadium • Notre Dame, IN							
March 21	at Notre Dame		Frank Eck Stadium • Notre Dame, IN							
March 22	at Notre Dame		Frank Eck Stadium • Notre Dame, IN							
March 24	at Indiana		Bart Kaufman Field • Bloomington, IN							
March 27	Georgia Tech		Jim Patterson Stadium • Louisville, KY							
March 28	Georgia Tech		Jim Patterson Stadium • Louisville, KY							
March 29	Georgia Tech		Jim Patterson Stadium • Louisville, KY							
March 31	Miami (OH)		Jim Patterson Stadium • Louisville, KY							

April

Date	Opponent	Rank	Site/stadium	Score	Win	Loss	Save	Attendance	Overall record	ACC Record
April 4	at Virginia		Davenport Field • Charlottesville, VA							
April 5	at Virginia		Davenport Field • Charlottesville, VA							
April 6	at Virginia		Davenport Field • Charlottesville, VA							
April 8	Kentucky		Jim Patterson Stadium • Louisville, KY	Postponed						
April 10	at Duke		Durham Bulls Athletic Park • Durham, NC							
April 11	at Duke		Durham Bulls Athletic Park • Durham, NC							
April 12	at Duke		Durham Bulls Athletic Park • Durham, NC							
April 14	at Ohio State		Bill Davis Stadium • Columbus, OH							
April 17	Wake Forest		Jim Patterson Stadium • Louisville, KY							
April 18	Wake Forest		Jim Patterson Stadium • Louisville, KY							
April 18	Wake Forest		Jim Patterson Stadium • Louisville, KY							
April 21	at Cincinnati		Marge Schott Stadium • Cincinnati, OH							
April 22	WKU		Jim Patterson Stadium • Louisville, KY							
April 24	Bethune-Cookman		Jim Patterson Stadium • Louisville, KY							
April 25	Bethune-Cookman		Jim Patterson Stadium • Louisville, KY							
April 26	Bethune-Cookman		Jim Patterson Stadium • Louisville, KY							
April 28	Kentucky		Jim Patterson Stadium • Louisville, KY							

May

Date	Opponent	Rank	Site/stadium	Score	Win	Loss	Save	Attendance	Overall record	ACC Record
May 2	at Clemson		Doug Kingsmore Stadium • Clemson, SC							
May 3	at Clemson		Doug Kingsmore Stadium • Clemson, SC							
May 4	at Clemson		Doug Kingsmore Stadium • Clemson, SC							
May 6	at Kentucky		Cliff Hagan Stadium • Lexington, KY							
May 8	Florida State		Jim Patterson Stadium • Louisville, KY							
May 9	Florida State		Jim Patterson Stadium • Louisville, KY							
May 10	Florida State		Jim Patterson Stadium • Louisville, KY							
May 12	Vanderbilt		Jim Patterson Stadium • Louisville, KY							
May 14	at NC State		Doak Field • Raleigh, NC							
May 15	at NC State		Doak Field • Raleigh, NC							
May 16	at NC State		Doak Field • Raleigh, NC							

Post-Season
ACC Tournament

Date	Opponent	Rank	Site/stadium	Score	Win	Loss	Save	Attendance	Overall record	ACCT Record
May 19	TBD		Durham Bulls Athletic Park • Durham, NC							

All rankings from Collegiate Baseball.

== Rankings ==
Ranking movements Legend: ██ Increase in ranking ██ Decrease in ranking ( ) = First-place votes
	Week																		
Poll	Pre	1	2	3	4	5	6	7	8	9	10	11	12	13	14	15	16	17	Final
Coaches'	7	7*	7	20	15	13	7	7	6	5	4(1)	4	3	2					
Baseball America	12	12	17	17	13	11	7	7	5	4	4	4	4	2					
Collegiate Baseball^	12	15	24	24	21	17	11	7	5	4	3	3	4	3					
NCBWA†	10	10	17	19	18	16	8	7	6	4	4	3	2	2					

^ Collegiate Baseball ranked 40 teams in their preseason poll, but only ranked 30 teams weekly during the season.
† NCBWA ranks 30 teams in their preseason poll, but only ranks 25 teams weekly during the season.
* A new poll was not released for this week, so for comparison purposes, the previous week's ranking is inserted in this week's slot.

== Awards and honors ==
Kyle Funkhouser

- Louisville Slugger Pre-season First Team All-American
- Perfect Game USA Pre-season First Team All-American
