= 2015 UCLA Bruins baseball team =

American college baseball season

2015 UCLA Bruins baseball

NCAA tournament, Los Angeles Regional
- Conference: Pac-12 Conference
- Record: 42-14 (22-8 Pac-12)
- Head coach: John Savage (11th season)
- Assistant coaches: Jake Silverman (5th season); T. J. Bruce (5th season); Rex Peters (4th season)
- Home stadium: Jackie Robinson Stadium

2015 Pac-12 Conference baseball standings
	Conf.						Overall
Team	W		L		T	PCT	W		L		T	PCT
No. 2 UCLA ‍†‍‍^{y}	22	–	8	–	0	.733	42	–	14	–	0	.750
No. 12 Oregon State ‍‍‍^{y}	19	–	10	–	1	.650	38	–	16	–	1	.700
No. 16 California ‍‍‍^{y}	18	–	12	–	0	.600	34	–	19	–	0	.642
No. 17 USC ‍‍‍^{y}	18	–	12	–	0	.600	37	–	19	–	0	.661
No. 18 Arizona State ‍‍‍^{y}	18	–	12	–	0	.600	34	–	21	–	0	.618
Oregon ‍‍‍^{y}	16	–	14	–	0	.533	37	–	23	–	0	.617
Washington ‍‍‍	14	–	16	–	0	.467	29	–	25	–	0	.537
Arizona ‍‍‍	12	–	18	–	0	.400	31	–	24	–	0	.564
Washington State ‍‍‍	11	–	19	–	0	.367	29	–	27	–	0	.518
Stanford ‍‍‍	9	–	21	–	0	.300	24	–	32	–	0	.429
Utah ‍‍‍	7	–	22	–	1	.250	16	–	36	–	1	.311
† – Conference champion y – Invited to the NCAA tournament As of May 25, 2015; Rankings from Collegiate Baseball

The 2015 UCLA Bruins baseball team represented the University of California, Los Angeles in the 2015 NCAA Division I baseball season. The Bruins competed in the Pac-12 Conference, and played their home games in Jackie Robinson Stadium. John Savage was in his eleventh season as head coach. The Bruins were coming off a season in which they were 25-30-1 (12-18 Pac-12), near the bottom of the Pac-12 Conference standings.

This season, the Bruins completed the regular season with a 42–14 record and were awarded the No. 1 seed in the 2015 NCAA Division I baseball tournament and as the host of the Los Angeles Regional. They played against the Cal State Bakersfield Roadrunners, and the Maryland Terrapins, beginning on May 29. They ended the season by losing the series to Maryland 1–2 in the final regional game.

== Ranking movements ==
Ranking movements Legend: ██ Increase in ranking ██ Decrease in ranking
	Week																		
Poll	Pre	1	2	3	4	5	6	7	8	9	10	11	12	13	14	15	16	17	Final
Coaches'	9	9*	9	6	9	9	6	6	5	3	2	2	5	4	3	2			
Baseball America	11	11	8	6	11	9	9	9	7	3	3	2	2	2	2	2			
Collegiate Baseball^	10	8	8	7	13	9	5	4	3	2	2	2	5	4	3	2			
NCBWA†	9	7	7	6	9	7	5	4	4	3	2	2	5	4	3	2			

^ Collegiate Baseball ranked 40 teams in their preseason poll, but only ranked 30 teams weekly during the season.
† NCBWA ranks 30 teams in their preseason poll, but only ranks 25 teams weekly during the season.
* A new poll was not released for this week, so for comparison purposes, the previous week's ranking is inserted in this week's slot.

== Awards and honors ==
- June 5, 2015 – Relief pitcher David Berg was named the National Collegiate Baseball Writers Association (NCBWA) District IX Player of the Year.

== UCLA Bruins in the 2015 MLB draft ==
The following members of the UCLA Bruins baseball program were drafted in the 2015 Major League Baseball draft.

Player	Position	Round	Overall	MLB team
James Kaprielian	Pitcher	1st	16	New York Yankees
Kevin Kramer	Shortstop	2nd	62	Pittsburgh Pirates
Cody Poteet	Pitcher	4th	116	Miami Marlins
David Berg	Pitcher	6th	173	Chicago Cubs
Ty Moore	Right Field	12th	367	Pittsburgh Pirates
Grant Watson	Pitcher	16th	486	San Francisco Giants
Chris Keck	Third Base	18th	527	Colorado Rockies
Tucker Forbes	Pitcher	30	906	San Francisco Giants
