= 2015 NCAA Division I baseball season =

Baseball season

- Number of teams: 301
- Preseason No. 1: Vanderbilt (Unanimous)
- Defending champions: Vanderbilt

Tournament
- Duration: May 29–June 24, 2015
- Most conference bids: ACC and SEC (7)

College World Series
- Champions: Virginia (1st title)
- Runners-up: Vanderbilt (3rd CWS Appearance)
- Winning coach: Brian O'Connor (1st title)
- MOP: Josh Sborz (Virginia)

Seasons
- ← 2014 2016 →

The 2015 NCAA Division I baseball season, play of college baseball in the United States organized by the National Collegiate Athletic Association (NCAA) at the Division I level, began in February 2015. The season progressed through the regular season, many conference tournaments and championship series, and concluded with the 2015 NCAA Division I baseball tournament and 2015 College World Series. The College World Series, consisting of the eight remaining teams in the NCAA tournament and held annually in Omaha, Nebraska, at TD Ameritrade Park Omaha, ended on June 24, 2015, with the final game of the best-of-three championship series between Vanderbilt and Virginia, won by Virginia.

== Realignment ==
There were many significant conference changes that took effect prior to the season.

- Maryland left the ACC for the Big Ten.
- Louisville and Rutgers left The American, joining the ACC and Big Ten respectively.
- A third team from The American, Temple, dropped baseball.
- East Carolina and Tulane left Conference USA for The American.
- Western Kentucky left the Sun Belt for Conference USA.
- Appalachian State, Davidson, Georgia Southern, and Elon all left the Southern Conference (SoCon). Appalachian State and Georgia Southern joined the Sun Belt, Davidson the Atlantic 10, and Elon the CAA.
- East Tennessee State and Mercer left the Atlantic Sun for the SoCon. ETSU returned to the SoCon after a nine-year absence.
- VMI left the Big South and returned to the SoCon after an 11-year absence.
- Oral Roberts returned to The Summit League after two seasons in the Southland.

In addition, the 2015 season was the last for Northern Kentucky in the Atlantic Sun and for NJIT as an independent. In July 2015, Northern Kentucky joined the Horizon League, and the Atlantic Sun replaced the Norse with NJIT. It was also the last for Texas–Pan American (UTPA) as an institution. UTPA merged with the University of Texas at Brownsville in July 2015 to form the new University of Texas Rio Grande Valley (UTRGV). The UTPA athletic program was inherited by UTRGV, with the nickname of Vaqueros, and UTRGV maintains UTPA's membership in the Western Athletic Conference.

=== Format changes ===
- The Big South Conference dropped its divisional format.

== New stadiums ==
- West Virginia opened the new Monongalia County Ballpark, with a fixed capacity of 2,500 plus extra hillside seating. The venue replaced Hawley Field, which closed for conference games after the 2012 season because it did not meet standards of the Big 12 Conference, which WVU joined in 2012. The Mountaineers played their 2013 and 2014 home conference games at several venues around the state, while Hawley Field remained in use for non-conference games. Once the college baseball season is over, the ballpark will be used by the West Virginia Black Bears, a Class A Short Season affiliate of the Pittsburgh Pirates.

== Season outlook ==
For the full rankings, see 2015 NCAA Division I baseball rankings

Collegiate Baseball News
| Ranking | Team |
|---|---|
| 1 | Vanderbilt |
| 2 | TCU |
| 3 | Virginia |
| 4 | LSU |
| 5 | Oklahoma State |
| 6 | Florida |
| 7 | Texas |
| 8 | Houston |
| 9 | Texas Tech |
| 10 | UCLA |
| 11 | Florida State |
| 12 | Louisville |
| 13 | Cal Poly |
| 14 | Miami (FL) |
| 15 | Oregon |
| 16 | UC Santa Barbara |
| 17 | Cal State Fullerton |
| 18 | Stanford |
| 19 | Arizona State |
| 20 | Mississippi State |
| 21 | South Carolina |
| 22 | Rice |
| 23 | Liberty |
| 24 | North Carolina |
| 25 | College of Charleston |

Perfect Game USA
| Ranking | Team |
|---|---|
| 1 | Vanderbilt |
| 2 | Virginia |
| 3 | TCU |
| 4 | Florida |
| 5 | UCLA |
| 6 | Texas |
| 7 | LSU |
| 8 | Houston |
| 9 | Louisville |
| 10 | Miami (FL) |
| 11 | Florida State |
| 12 | Texas Tech |
| 13 | Oklahoma State |
| 14 | South Carolina |
| 15 | Oregon |
| 16 | Arkansas |
| 17 | North Carolina |
| 18 | UC Santa Barbara |
| 19 | Cal State Fullerton |
| 20 | Arizona State |
| 21 | Rice |
| 22 | Stanford |
| 23 | Mississippi State |
| 24 | Kennesaw State |
| 25 | Texas A&M |

Baseball America
| Ranking | Team |
|---|---|
| 1 | Vanderbilt |
| 2 | LSU |
| 3 | Houston |
| 4 | Virginia |
| 5 | Texas Tech |
| 6 | Florida |
| 7 | TCU |
| 8 | Oklahoma State |
| 9 | Miami (FL) |
| 10 | Texas |
| 11 | UCLA |
| 12 | Louisville |
| 13 | South Carolina |
| 14 | Mississippi State |
| 15 | Rice |
| 16 | Maryland |
| 17 | North Carolina |
| 18 | Arizona State |
| 19 | Kennesaw State |
| 20 | Oregon |
| 21 | Florida State |
| 22 | UCF |
| 23 | Cal State Fullerton |
| 24 | Clemson |
| 25 | Liberty |

Coaches
| Ranking | Team |
|---|---|
| 1 | Vanderbilt |
| 2 | Virginia |
| 3 | TCU |
| 4 | LSU |
| 5 | Florida |
| 6 | Texas |
| 7 | Louisville |
| 8 | Oklahoma State |
| 9 | UCLA |
| 10 | South Carolina |
| 11 | Houston |
| 12 | Florida State |
| 13 | Texas Tech |
| 14 | Miami (FL) |
| 15 | North Carolina |
| 16 | Oregon |
| 17 | Rice |
| 18 | Ole Miss |
| 19 | Cal State Fullerton |
| 20 | Maryland |
| 21 | Arizona State |
| 22 | Stanford |
| 23 | Texas A&M |
| 24 | Cal Poly |
| 25 | Mississippi State |

NCBWA
| Ranking | Team |
|---|---|
| 1 | Vanderbilt |
| 2 | Virginia |
| 3 | TCU |
| 4 | LSU |
| 5 | Florida |
| 6 | Texas |
| 7 | Houston |
| 8 | Oklahoma State |
| 9 | UCLA |
| 10 | Louisville |
| 11 | South Carolina |
| 12 | Texas Tech |
| 13 | Miami (FL) |
| 14 | North Carolina |
| 15 | Rice |
| 16 | Florida State |
| 17 | Oregon |
| 18 | Cal State Fullerton |
| 19 | Ole Miss |
| 20 | Maryland |
| 21 | Arizona State |
| 22 | Mississippi State |
| 23 | Cal Poly |
| 24 | Stanford |
| 25 | Texas A&M |

== Conference standings ==
2015 America East Conference baseball standings
| | Conf. | | | | | | Overall |
| Team | W | | L | | T | PCT | W | | L | | T | PCT |
|---|---|---|---|---|---|---|---|---|---|---|---|---|
| Stony Brook †‡^{y} ‍‍‍ | 18 | – | 4 | – | 1 | .804 | 35 | – | 16 | – | 1 | .683 |
| UMBC ‍‍‍ | 14 | – | 10 | – | 0 | .583 | 34 | – | 20 | – | 0 | .630 |
| Maine ‍‍‍ | 10 | – | 10 | – | 0 | .500 | 24 | – | 28 | – | 0 | .462 |
| UMass Lowell * ‍‍‍ | 10 | – | 10 | – | 0 | .500 | 17 | – | 26 | – | 0 | .395 |
| Hartford ‍‍‍ | 10 | – | 12 | – | 0 | .455 | 23 | – | 31 | – | 0 | .426 |
| Albany ‍‍‍ | 7 | – | 13 | – | 0 | .350 | 14 | – | 28 | – | 0 | .333 |
| Binghamton ‍‍‍ | 6 | – | 16 | – | 1 | .283 | 17 | – | 24 | – | 2 | .419 |
† – Conference champion ‡ – Tournament champion y – Invited to the NCAA tournament Ineligible for league and NCAA tournaments due to transition from Division II; As of June 30, 2015; Rankings from Collegiate Baseball

2015 American Athletic Conference baseball standings
| | Conf. | | | | | | Overall |
| Team | W | | L | | T | PCT | W | | L | | T | PCT |
|---|---|---|---|---|---|---|---|---|---|---|---|---|
| Houston ‍†‍‍^{y} | 16 | – | 8 | – | 0 | .667 | 43 | – | 20 | – | 0 | .683 |
| East Carolina‡^{y} ‍‍‍ | 15 | – | 9 | – | 0 | .625 | 40 | – | 22 | – | 0 | .645 |
| Tulane ‍‍‍^{y} | 13 | – | 11 | – | 0 | .542 | 35 | – | 25 | – | 0 | .583 |
| South Florida^{y} ‍‍‍ | 13 | – | 11 | – | 0 | .542 | 34 | – | 26 | – | 1 | .566 |
| Memphis ‍‍‍ | 12 | – | 12 | – | 0 | .500 | 37 | – | 21 | – | 0 | .638 |
| Connecticut ‍‍‍ | 11 | – | 13 | – | 0 | .458 | 35 | – | 25 | – | 0 | .583 |
| UCF ‍‍‍ | 10 | – | 14 | – | 0 | .417 | 31 | – | 27 | – | 0 | .534 |
| Cincinnati ‍‍‍ | 6 | – | 18 | – | 0 | .250 | 15 | – | 41 | – | 0 | .268 |
† – Conference champion ‡ – Tournament champion y – Invited to the NCAA tournament As of June 30, 2015; Rankings from Collegiate Baseball

2015 Atlantic 10 Conference baseball standings
| | Conf. | | | | | | Overall |
| Team | W | | L | | T | PCT | W | | L | | T | PCT |
|---|---|---|---|---|---|---|---|---|---|---|---|---|
| Saint Louis ‍†‍‍ | 16 | – | 8 | – | 0 | .667 | 35 | – | 21 | – | 0 | .625 |
| Richmond ‍‍‍ | 15 | – | 9 | – | 0 | .625 | 28 | – | 25 | – | 0 | .528 |
| Rhode Island ‍‍‍ | 15 | – | 9 | – | 0 | .625 | 26 | – | 25 | – | 1 | .510 |
| No. 15 VCU ‍‍‡‍^{y} | 14 | – | 10 | – | 0 | .583 | 40 | – | 25 | – | 0 | .615 |
| Davidson ‍‍‍ | 14 | – | 10 | – | 0 | .583 | 28 | – | 22 | – | 0 | .560 |
| George Washington ‍‍‍ | 13 | – | 10 | – | 0 | .565 | 32 | – | 22 | – | 0 | .593 |
| Fordham ‍‍‍ | 13 | – | 11 | – | 0 | .542 | 22 | – | 32 | – | 0 | .407 |
| La Salle ‍‍‍ | 12 | – | 12 | – | 0 | .500 | 24 | – | 27 | – | 1 | .471 |
| George Mason ‍‍‍ | 12 | – | 12 | – | 0 | .500 | 23 | – | 27 | – | 1 | .461 |
| UMass ‍‍‍ | 12 | – | 12 | – | 0 | .500 | 16 | – | 27 | – | 0 | .372 |
| Saint Joseph's ‍‍‍ | 11 | – | 12 | – | 0 | .478 | 21 | – | 28 | – | 0 | .429 |
| Dayton ‍‍‍ | 5 | – | 19 | – | 0 | .208 | 16 | – | 38 | – | 0 | .296 |
| St. Bonaventure ‍‍‍ | 3 | – | 21 | – | 0 | .125 | 16 | – | 28 | – | 2 | .370 |
† – Conference champion ‡ – Tournament champion y – Invited to the NCAA tournament As of June 30, 2015; Rankings from Collegiate Baseball

2015 Atlantic Coast Conference baseball standings
| | Conf. | | | | Overall |
| Team | W | | L | PCT | W | | L | PCT |
|---|---|---|---|---|---|---|---|---|
Atlantic
| No. 10 Louisville ^{x}‍‍‍^{y} | 25 | – | 5 | .833 | 47 | – | 18 | .723 |
| No. 26 Notre Dame ‍‍‍^{y} | 17 | – | 13 | .567 | 37 | – | 23 | .617 |
| No. 12 Florida State ‍‍‡‍^{y} | 17 | – | 13 | .567 | 44 | – | 21 | .677 |
| Clemson ‍‍‍^{y} | 16 | – | 13 | .552 | 32 | – | 29 | .525 |
| NC State ‍‍‍^{y} | 15 | – | 14 | .517 | 36 | – | 23 | .610 |
| Wake Forest ‍‍‍ | 12 | – | 18 | .400 | 27 | – | 26 | .509 |
| Boston College ‍‍‍ | 10 | – | 19 | .345 | 27 | – | 27 | .500 |
Coastal
| No. 6 Miami (FL) ^{x}‍‍‍^{y} | 22 | – | 8 | .733 | 50 | – | 16 | .758 |
| No. 1 Virginia ‍‍‍^{y} | 15 | – | 15 | .500 | 44 | – | 24 | .647 |
| North Carolina ‍‍‍ | 13 | – | 16 | .448 | 34 | – | 24 | .586 |
| Virginia Tech ‍‍‍ | 13 | – | 16 | .448 | 27 | – | 27 | .500 |
| Georgia Tech ‍‍‍ | 13 | – | 17 | .433 | 32 | – | 23 | .582 |
| Duke ‍‍‍ | 10 | – | 19 | .345 | 31 | – | 22 | .585 |
| Pittsburgh ‍‍‍ | 9 | – | 21 | .300 | 20 | – | 32 | .385 |
x – Division champion ‡ – Tournament champion y – Invited to the NCAA tournament As of June 30, 2015; Rankings from Collegiate Baseball

2015 Atlantic Sun Conference baseball standings
| | Conf. | | | | | | Overall |
| Team | W | | L | | T | PCT | W | | L | | T | PCT |
|---|---|---|---|---|---|---|---|---|---|---|---|---|
| North Florida ‍†‍‍ | 16 | – | 5 | – | 0 | .762 | 45 | – | 16 | – | 0 | .738 |
| Lipscomb ‍‍‡‍^{y} | 13 | – | 8 | – | 0 | .619 | 39 | – | 20 | – | 0 | .661 |
| Stetson ‍‍‍ | 12 | – | 9 | – | 0 | .571 | 29 | – | 30 | – | 0 | .492 |
| Jacksonville ‍‍‍ | 12 | – | 9 | – | 0 | .571 | 26 | – | 30 | – | 0 | .464 |
| Florida Gulf Coast ‍‍‍ | 11 | – | 9 | – | 0 | .550 | 30 | – | 26 | – | 1 | .535 |
| Kennesaw State ‍‍‍ | 10 | – | 10 | – | 0 | .500 | 28 | – | 28 | – | 0 | .500 |
| Northern Kentucky ‍‍‍ | 5 | – | 16 | – | 0 | .238 | 17 | – | 34 | – | 0 | .333 |
| USC Upstate ‍‍‍ | 4 | – | 17 | – | 0 | .190 | 15 | – | 38 | – | 0 | .283 |
† – Conference champion ‡ – Tournament champion y – Invited to the NCAA tournament As of June 30, 2015; Rankings from Collegiate Baseball

2015 Big 12 Conference baseball standings
| | Conf. | | | | Overall |
| Team | W | | L | PCT | W | | L | PCT |
|---|---|---|---|---|---|---|---|---|
| No. 4 TCU ‍†‍‍^{y} | 18 | – | 5 | .783 | 51 | – | 15 | .773 |
| No. 19 Oklahoma State ‍‍‍^{y} | 14 | – | 8 | .636 | 38 | – | 20 | .655 |
| Oklahoma ‍‍‍ | 13 | – | 11 | .542 | 34 | – | 27 | .557 |
| Texas Tech ‍‍‍ | 13 | – | 11 | .542 | 31 | – | 24 | .564 |
| Texas ‍‍‡‍^{y} | 11 | – | 13 | .458 | 30 | – | 27 | .526 |
| Kansas State ‍‍‍ | 10 | – | 14 | .417 | 27 | – | 30 | .474 |
| West Virginia ‍‍‍ | 9 | – | 13 | .409 | 27 | – | 27 | .500 |
| Baylor ‍‍‍ | 9 | – | 15 | .375 | 23 | – | 32 | .418 |
| Kansas ‍‍‍ | 8 | – | 15 | .348 | 23 | – | 32 | .418 |
† – Conference champion ‡ – Tournament champion y – Invited to the NCAA tournament Rankings from Collegiate Baseball

2015 Big East Conference baseball standings
| | Conf. | | | | Overall |
| Team | W | | L | PCT | W | | L | PCT |
|---|---|---|---|---|---|---|---|---|
| No. 30 St. John's ‍‍‍ | 14 | – | 3 | .824 | 28 | – | 24 | .538 |
| Creighton ‍‍‍ | 13 | – | 4 | .765 | 27 | – | 14 | .659 |
| Seton Hall ‍‍‍ | 9 | – | 9 | .500 | 21 | – | 20 | .512 |
| Georgetown ‍‍‍ | 8 | – | 10 | .444 | 22 | – | 22 | .500 |
| Butler ‍‍‍ | 8 | – | 10 | .444 | 18 | – | 27 | .400 |
| Villanova ‍‍‍ | 7 | – | 11 | .389 | 19 | – | 24 | .442 |
| Xavier ‍‍‍ | 3 | – | 15 | .167 | 13 | – | 33 | .283 |
‡ – Tournament champion As of May 4, 2015; Rankings from Collegiate Baseball

2015 Big South Conference baseball standings
| | Conf. | | | | Overall |
| Team | W | | L | PCT | W | | L | PCT |
|---|---|---|---|---|---|---|---|---|
| Radford ‍‍‍ | 20 | – | 4 | .833 | 39 | – | 14 | .736 |
| Coastal Carolina ‍‍‍ | 17 | – | 7 | .708 | 35 | – | 18 | .660 |
| Winthrop ‍‍‍ | 16 | – | 8 | .667 | 38 | – | 17 | .691 |
| Liberty ‍‍‍ | 16 | – | 8 | .667 | 33 | – | 21 | .611 |
| High Point ‍‍‍ | 14 | – | 10 | .583 | 27 | – | 24 | .529 |
| Campbell ‍‍‍ | 12 | – | 12 | .500 | 31 | – | 23 | .574 |
| Charleston Southern ‍‍‍ | 10 | – | 14 | .417 | 23 | – | 28 | .451 |
| Longwood ‍‍‍ | 9 | – | 15 | .375 | 21 | – | 32 | .396 |
| Gardner–Webb ‍‍‍ | 7 | – | 17 | .292 | 22 | – | 31 | .415 |
| Presbyterian ‍‍‍ | 6 | – | 18 | .250 | 27 | – | 28 | .491 |
| UNC Asheville ‍‍‍ | 5 | – | 19 | .208 | 21 | – | 34 | .382 |
‡ – Tournament champion As of May 17, 2015; Rankings from Collegiate Baseball

2015 Big Ten Conference baseball standings
| | Conf. | | | | | | Overall |
| Team | W | | L | | T | PCT | W | | L | | T | PCT |
|---|---|---|---|---|---|---|---|---|---|---|---|---|
| No. 9 Illinois ‍†‍‍^{y} | 21 | – | 1 | – | 0 | .955 | 50 | – | 10 | – | 1 | .828 |
| No. 20 Iowa ‍‍‍^{y} | 19 | – | 5 | – | 0 | .792 | 41 | – | 18 | – | 0 | .695 |
| No. 14 Maryland ‍‍‍^{y} | 14 | – | 10 | – | 0 | .583 | 42 | – | 24 | – | 0 | .636 |
| Michigan ‍‍‡‍^{y} | 14 | – | 10 | – | 0 | .583 | 39 | – | 25 | – | 0 | .609 |
| Michigan State ‍‍‍ | 14 | – | 10 | – | 0 | .583 | 34 | – | 23 | – | 0 | .596 |
| Indiana ‍‍‍^{y} | 12 | – | 10 | – | 0 | .545 | 35 | – | 24 | – | 0 | .593 |
| Ohio State ‍‍‍ | 13 | – | 11 | – | 0 | .542 | 35 | – | 21 | – | 0 | .625 |
| Nebraska ‍‍‍ | 9 | – | 14 | – | 0 | .391 | 34 | – | 23 | – | 0 | .596 |
| Minnesota ‍‍‍ | 9 | – | 15 | – | 0 | .375 | 21 | – | 30 | – | 0 | .412 |
| Northwestern ‍‍‍ | 8 | – | 16 | – | 0 | .333 | 18 | – | 36 | – | 0 | .333 |
| Rutgers ‍‍‍ | 7 | – | 17 | – | 0 | .292 | 19 | – | 35 | – | 1 | .355 |
| Penn State ‍‍‍ | 6 | – | 16 | – | 0 | .273 | 18 | – | 30 | – | 0 | .375 |
| Purdue ‍‍‍ | 6 | – | 17 | – | 0 | .261 | 20 | – | 34 | – | 0 | .370 |
† – Conference champion ‡ – Tournament champion y – Invited to the NCAA tournament As of June 8, 2015; Rankings from Collegiate Baseball

2015 Big West Conference baseball standings
| | Conf. | | | | | | Overall |
| Team | W | | L | | T | PCT | W | | L | | T | PCT |
|---|---|---|---|---|---|---|---|---|---|---|---|---|
| #6 Cal State Fullerton †y ‍‍‍ | 19 | – | 5 | – | 0 | .792 | 39 | – | 25 | – | 0 | .609 |
| #25 UC Santa Barbara y ‍‍‍ | 16 | – | 8 | – | 0 | .667 | 40 | – | 17 | – | 1 | .698 |
| UC Irvine ‍‍‍ | 15 | – | 9 | – | 0 | .625 | 33 | – | 23 | – | 0 | .589 |
| Cal Poly ‍‍‍ | 14 | – | 10 | – | 0 | .583 | 27 | – | 27 | – | 0 | .500 |
| Hawaii ‍‍‍ | 12 | – | 12 | – | 0 | .500 | 21 | – | 32 | – | 0 | .396 |
| Long Beach State ‍‍‍ | 11 | – | 13 | – | 0 | .458 | 28 | – | 26 | – | 0 | .519 |
| UC Davis ‍‍‍ | 9 | – | 15 | – | 0 | .375 | 30 | – | 26 | – | 1 | .535 |
| Cal State Northridge ‍‍‍ | 8 | – | 16 | – | 0 | .333 | 33 | – | 24 | – | 0 | .579 |
| UC Riverside ‍‍‍ | 4 | – | 20 | – | 0 | .167 | 15 | – | 40 | – | 0 | .273 |
† – Conference champion y – Invited to the NCAA tournament As of June 8, 2015; Rankings from Collegiate Baseball

2015 Conference USA baseball standings
| | Conf. | | | | | | Overall |
| Team | W | | L | | T | PCT | W | | L | | T | PCT |
|---|---|---|---|---|---|---|---|---|---|---|---|---|
| No. 20 Rice ‍†‍‍^{y} | 22 | – | 8 | – | 0 | .733 | 35 | – | 18 | – | 0 | .660 |
| #24 Florida Atlantic ^{y} ‍‍‍ | 19 | – | 10 | – | 0 | .655 | 38 | – | 15 | – | 0 | .717 |
| Southern Miss ‍‍‍ | 19 | – | 10 | – | 0 | .655 | 35 | – | 16 | – | 1 | .683 |
| Middle Tennessee ‍‍‍ | 19 | – | 11 | – | 0 | .633 | 30 | – | 25 | – | 0 | .545 |
| UTSA ‍‍‍ | 17 | – | 13 | – | 0 | .567 | 32 | – | 23 | – | 0 | .582 |
| UAB ‍‍‍ | 15 | – | 15 | – | 0 | .500 | 30 | – | 24 | – | 0 | .556 |
| Old Dominion ‍‍‍ | 13 | – | 17 | – | 0 | .433 | 27 | – | 27 | – | 0 | .500 |
| FIU ‍‍‡‍^{y} | 13 | – | 17 | – | 0 | .433 | 25 | – | 29 | – | 0 | .463 |
| Marshall ‍‍‍ | 12 | – | 18 | – | 0 | .400 | 20 | – | 32 | – | 0 | .385 |
| Charlotte ‍‍‍ | 11 | – | 19 | – | 0 | .367 | 19 | – | 29 | – | 0 | .396 |
| WKU ‍‍‍ | 10 | – | 19 | – | 0 | .345 | 24 | – | 28 | – | 0 | .462 |
| Louisiana Tech ‍‍‍ | 8 | – | 21 | – | 0 | .276 | 25 | – | 27 | – | 0 | .481 |
† – Conference champion ‡ – Tournament champion y – Invited to the NCAA tournament As of May 5, 2015; Rankings from Collegiate Baseball

2015 Missouri Valley Conference baseball standings
| | Conf. | | | | Overall |
| Team | W | | L | PCT | W | | L | PCT |
|---|---|---|---|---|---|---|---|---|
| No. 13 Missouri State ‍‍‡‍^{y} | 18 | – | 3 | .857 | 41 | – | 10 | .804 |
| No. 21 Dallas Baptist ‍‍‍^{y} | 15 | – | 6 | .714 | 41 | – | 11 | .788 |
| Bradley ‍‍‍^{y} | 10 | – | 11 | .476 | 32 | – | 18 | .640 |
| Wichita State ‍‍‍ | 10 | – | 11 | .476 | 24 | – | 31 | .436 |
| Illinois State ‍‍‍ | 9 | – | 12 | .429 | 27 | – | 25 | .519 |
| Evansville ‍‍‍ | 8 | – | 13 | .381 | 29 | – | 22 | .569 |
| Indiana State ‍‍‍ | 8 | – | 13 | .381 | 27 | – | 24 | .529 |
| Southern Illinois ‍‍‍ | 6 | – | 15 | .286 | 11 | – | 44 | .200 |
‡ – Tournament champion y – Invited to the NCAA tournament As of May 16, 2015; Rankings from Collegiate Baseball

2015 Mountain West Conference baseball standings
| | Conf. | | | | Overall |
| Team | W | | L | PCT | W | | L | PCT |
|---|---|---|---|---|---|---|---|---|
| No. 29 Nevada ‍‍‍ | 21 | – | 6 | .778 | 38 | – | 12 | .760 |
| San Diego State ‍‍‍ | 17 | – | 10 | .630 | 32 | – | 18 | .640 |
| New Mexico ‍‍‍ | 13 | – | 11 | .542 | 24 | – | 23 | .511 |
| Fresno State ‍‍‍ | 13 | – | 11 | .542 | 24 | – | 25 | .490 |
| Air Force ‍‍‍ | 10 | – | 14 | .417 | 21 | – | 24 | .467 |
| UNLV ‍‍‍ | 8 | – | 16 | .333 | 22 | – | 25 | .468 |
| San Jose State ‍‍‍ | 5 | – | 19 | .208 | 12 | – | 37 | .245 |
‡ – Tournament champion As of May 6, 2015; Rankings from Collegiate Baseball

2015 NCAA Division I baseball independents standings
| | Conf. | | | | Overall |
| Team | W | | L | PCT | W | | L | PCT |
|---|---|---|---|---|---|---|---|---|
| NJIT ‍‍‍ | | – | | – | 20 | – | 19 | .513 |
| NYIT ‍‍‍ | | – | | – | 14 | – | 26 | .350 |
As of May 5, 2015; Rankings from Collegiate Baseball

2015 Pac-12 Conference baseball standings
| | Conf. | | | | | | Overall |
| Team | W | | L | | T | PCT | W | | L | | T | PCT |
|---|---|---|---|---|---|---|---|---|---|---|---|---|
| No. 2 UCLA ‍†‍‍^{y} | 22 | – | 8 | – | 0 | .733 | 42 | – | 14 | – | 0 | .750 |
| No. 12 Oregon State ‍‍‍^{y} | 19 | – | 10 | – | 1 | .650 | 38 | – | 16 | – | 1 | .700 |
| No. 16 California ‍‍‍^{y} | 18 | – | 12 | – | 0 | .600 | 34 | – | 19 | – | 0 | .642 |
| No. 17 USC ‍‍‍^{y} | 18 | – | 12 | – | 0 | .600 | 37 | – | 19 | – | 0 | .661 |
| No. 18 Arizona State ‍‍‍^{y} | 18 | – | 12 | – | 0 | .600 | 34 | – | 21 | – | 0 | .618 |
| Oregon ‍‍‍^{y} | 16 | – | 14 | – | 0 | .533 | 37 | – | 23 | – | 0 | .617 |
| Washington ‍‍‍ | 14 | – | 16 | – | 0 | .467 | 29 | – | 25 | – | 0 | .537 |
| Arizona ‍‍‍ | 12 | – | 18 | – | 0 | .400 | 31 | – | 24 | – | 0 | .564 |
| Washington State ‍‍‍ | 11 | – | 19 | – | 0 | .367 | 29 | – | 27 | – | 0 | .518 |
| Stanford ‍‍‍ | 9 | – | 21 | – | 0 | .300 | 24 | – | 32 | – | 0 | .429 |
| Utah ‍‍‍ | 7 | – | 22 | – | 1 | .250 | 16 | – | 36 | – | 1 | .311 |
† – Conference champion y – Invited to the NCAA tournament As of May 25, 2015; Rankings from Collegiate Baseball

2015 Southeastern Conference baseball standings
| | Conf. | | | | Overall |
| Team | W | | L | PCT | W | | L | PCT |
|---|---|---|---|---|---|---|---|---|
Eastern
| No. 2 Vanderbilt ^{x}‍‍‍^{y} | 20 | – | 10 | .667 | 51 | – | 21 | .708 |
| No. 3 Florida ‍‍‡‍^{y} | 19 | – | 11 | .633 | 52 | – | 18 | .743 |
| Missouri ‍‍‍ | 15 | – | 15 | .500 | 30 | – | 28 | .517 |
| Kentucky ‍‍‍ | 14 | – | 15 | .483 | 30 | – | 25 | .545 |
| South Carolina ‍‍‍ | 13 | – | 17 | .433 | 32 | – | 25 | .561 |
| Tennessee ‍‍‍ | 11 | – | 18 | .379 | 24 | – | 26 | .480 |
| Georgia ‍‍‍ | 10 | – | 19 | .345 | 26 | – | 28 | .481 |
Western
| No. 5 LSU ^{x}‍†‍‍^{y} | 21 | – | 8 | .724 | 54 | – | 12 | .818 |
| No. 11 Texas A&M ‍‍‍^{y} | 18 | – | 10 | .643 | 50 | – | 14 | .781 |
| No. 7 Arkansas ‍‍‍^{y} | 17 | – | 12 | .586 | 40 | – | 25 | .615 |
| Ole Miss ‍‍‍^{y} | 15 | – | 14 | .517 | 30 | – | 28 | .517 |
| Auburn ‍‍‍^{y} | 13 | – | 17 | .433 | 36 | – | 26 | .581 |
| Alabama ‍‍‍ | 12 | – | 18 | .400 | 32 | – | 28 | .533 |
| Mississippi State ‍‍‍ | 8 | – | 22 | .267 | 24 | – | 30 | .444 |
x – Division champion † – Conference champion ‡ – Tournament champion y – Invited to the NCAA tournament Rankings from Collegiate Baseball

2015 Southland Conference baseball standings
| | Conf. | | | | | | Overall |
| Team | W | | L | | T | PCT | W | | L | | T | PCT |
|---|---|---|---|---|---|---|---|---|---|---|---|---|
| Southeastern Louisiana ‍†‍‍ | 25 | – | 5 | – | 0 | .833 | 42 | – | 17 | – | 0 | .712 |
| Northwestern State ‍‍‍ | 20 | – | 8 | – | 0 | .714 | 31 | – | 23 | – | 0 | .574 |
| Nicholls State ‍‍‍ | 18 | – | 11 | – | 0 | .621 | 34 | – | 19 | – | 1 | .639 |
| McNeese State ‍‍‍ | 18 | – | 12 | – | 0 | .600 | 32 | – | 25 | – | 0 | .561 |
| Sam Houston State ‍‍‍ | 17 | – | 12 | – | 0 | .586 | 31 | – | 28 | – | 0 | .525 |
| Central Arkansas ‍‍‍ | 16 | – | 14 | – | 0 | .533 | 29 | – | 24 | – | 0 | .547 |
| Houston Baptist ‍‍‡‍^{y} | 14 | – | 13 | – | 0 | .519 | 28 | – | 27 | – | 0 | .509 |
| Texas A&M–Corpus Christi ‍‍‍ | 13 | – | 14 | – | 0 | .481 | 26 | – | 27 | – | 0 | .491 |
| Abilene Christian * ‍‍‍ | 13 | – | 17 | – | 0 | .433 | 17 | – | 38 | – | 0 | .309 |
| Stephen F. Austin ‍‍‍ | 11 | – | 18 | – | 0 | .379 | 17 | – | 34 | – | 0 | .333 |
| Incarnate Word * ‍‍‍ | 11 | – | 19 | – | 0 | .367 | 21 | – | 33 | – | 0 | .389 |
| Lamar ‍‍‍ | 10 | – | 19 | – | 0 | .345 | 21 | – | 31 | – | 0 | .404 |
| New Orleans ‍‍‍ | 3 | – | 27 | – | 0 | .100 | 14 | – | 40 | – | 0 | .259 |
† – Conference champion ‡ – Tournament champion y – Invited to the NCAA tournament As of May 31, 2015; Rankings from Collegiate Baseball; *Ineligible for postseason play due to Division I transition

2015 Summit League baseball standings
| | Conf. | | | | Overall |
| Team | W | | L | PCT | W | | L | PCT |
|---|---|---|---|---|---|---|---|---|
| Oral Roberts ‍‍‍ | 22 | – | 5 | .815 | 35 | – | 14 | .714 |
| South Dakota State ‍‍‍ | 17 | – | 10 | .630 | 31 | – | 20 | .608 |
| IPFW ‍‍‍ | 12 | – | 15 | .444 | 25 | – | 23 | .521 |
| Omaha † ‍‍‍ | 11 | – | 16 | .407 | 18 | – | 28 | .391 |
| Western Illinois ‍‍‍ | 10 | – | 17 | .370 | 17 | – | 30 | .362 |
| North Dakota State ‍‍‍ | 9 | – | 18 | .333 | 18 | – | 28 | .391 |
‡ – Tournament champion † Ineligible for league and NCAA tournaments due to transition from Division II; As of May 12, 2015; Rankings from Collegiate Baseball

2015 Sun Belt Conference baseball standings
| | Conf. | | | | | | Overall |
| Team | W | | L | | T | PCT | W | | L | | T | PCT |
|---|---|---|---|---|---|---|---|---|---|---|---|---|
| South Alabama ‍†‍‍ | 19 | – | 9 | – | 0 | .679 | 37 | – | 20 | – | 0 | .649 |
| Troy ‍‍‍ | 18 | – | 10 | – | 0 | .643 | 30 | – | 25 | – | 0 | .545 |
| No. 16 Louisiana–Lafayette ‍‍‡‍^{y} | 18 | – | 11 | – | 0 | .621 | 42 | – | 23 | – | 0 | .646 |
| Georgia Southern ‍‍‍ | 18 | – | 12 | – | 0 | .600 | 30 | – | 27 | – | 0 | .526 |
| Georgia State ‍‍‍ | 15 | – | 13 | – | 0 | .536 | 30 | – | 27 | – | 0 | .526 |
| Texas State ‍‍‍ | 14 | – | 16 | – | 0 | .467 | 24 | – | 30 | – | 1 | .445 |
| UT Arlington ‍‍‍ | 14 | – | 16 | – | 0 | .467 | 24 | – | 32 | – | 0 | .429 |
| Arkansas State ‍‍‍ | 12 | – | 17 | – | 0 | .414 | 27 | – | 30 | – | 0 | .474 |
| Arkansas–Little Rock ‍‍‍ | 12 | – | 17 | – | 0 | .414 | 16 | – | 33 | – | 0 | .327 |
| Louisiana–Monroe ‍‍‍ | 12 | – | 18 | – | 0 | .400 | 25 | – | 29 | – | 0 | .463 |
| Appalachian State ‍‍‍ | 8 | – | 21 | – | 0 | .276 | 17 | – | 36 | – | 0 | .321 |
† – Conference champion ‡ – Tournament champion y – Invited to the NCAA tournament As of June 11, 2015; Rankings from Collegiate Baseball

=== Conference winners and tournaments ===
Twenty-nine athletic conferences each end their regular seasons with a single-elimination tournament or a double-elimination tournament. The teams in each conference that win their regular season title are given the number one seed in each tournament. The winners of these tournaments receive automatic invitations to the 2015 NCAA Division I baseball tournament.

| Conference | Regular season winner | Conference player of the year | Conference coach of the year | Conference tournament | Tournament venue (city) | Tournament winner |
|---|---|---|---|---|---|---|
| America East Conference | Stony Brook | Jack Parenty, Stony Brook | Bob Mumma, UMBC | 2015 America East Conference baseball tournament | Edward A. LeLacheur Park • Lowell, MA | Stony Brook |
| American Athletic Conference | Houston | Ian Happ, Cincinnati | Cliff Godwin, East Carolina | 2015 American Athletic Conference baseball tournament | Bright House Field • Clearwater, FL | East Carolina |
| Atlantic 10 Conference | Saint Louis | Michael Morman, Richmond | Raphael Cerrato, Rhode Island | 2015 Atlantic 10 Conference baseball tournament | Barcroft Park • Arlington, VA | VCU |
| Atlantic Coast Conference | Atlantic - Louisville; Coastal - Miami (FL) | Will Craig, Wake Forest | Dan McDonnell, Louisville | 2015 Atlantic Coast Conference baseball tournament | Durham Bulls Athletic Park • Durham, NC | Florida State |
| Atlantic Sun Conference | North Florida | Donnie Dewees, North Florida | Smoke Laval, North Florida | 2015 Atlantic Sun Conference baseball tournament | Swanson Stadium • Fort Myers, FL | Lipscomb |
| Big 12 Conference | TCU | Cody Jones, TCU | Jim Schlossnagle, TCU | 2015 Big 12 Conference baseball tournament | ONEOK Field • Tulsa, OK | Texas |
| Big East Conference | St. John's | Nick Collins, Georgetown | Ed Blankmeyer, St. John's | 2015 Big East Conference baseball tournament | TD Ameritrade Park Omaha • Omaha, NE | St. John's |
| Big South Conference | Radford | Cole Hallum, Campbell | Joe Raccuia, Radford | 2015 Big South Conference baseball tournament | John Henry Moss Stadium • Boiling Springs, NC | Radford |
| Big Ten Conference | Illinois | David Kerian, Illinois | Dan Hartleb, Illinois | 2015 Big Ten Conference baseball tournament | Target Field • Minneapolis, MN | Michigan |
| Big West Conference | Cal State Fullerton | Cameron Newell, UC Santa Barbara & David Olmedo-Barrera, Cal State Fullerton | Rick Vanderhook, Cal State Fullerton | No tournament, regular season champion earns auto bid | | |
| Colonial Athletic Association | College of Charleston | Blake Butler, College of Charleston | Monte Lee, College of Charleston | 2015 Colonial Athletic Association baseball tournament | CofC Baseball Stadium at Patriot's Point • Mount Pleasant, SC | UNC Wilmington |
| Conference USA | Rice | Brendon Sanger, FAU | Jim McGuire, Memphis | 2015 Conference USA baseball tournament | Pete Taylor Park • Hattiesburg, MS | FIU |
| Horizon League | UIC | Jeff Boehm, UIC | Mike Dee, UIC | 2015 Horizon League baseball tournament | Oil City Stadium • Whiting, IN | Wright State |
| Ivy League | Gehrig - Columbia/Penn; Rolfe - Dartmouth | Gus Craig, Columbia & Austin Bossart, Penn | Brett Boretti, Columbia | 2015 Ivy League Baseball Championship Series | Campus sites | Columbia |
| Metro Atlantic Athletic Conference | Rider | Brett Siddall, Canisius | Barry Davis, Rider | 2015 Metro Atlantic Athletic Conference baseball tournament | Dutchess Stadium • Wappingers Falls, NY | Canisius |
| Mid-American Conference | East - Kent State; West - Central Michigan | Mitch Longo, Ohio | Steve Jaksa, Central Michigan | 2015 Mid-American Conference baseball tournament | All Pro Freight Stadium • Avon, OH | Ohio |
| Mid-Eastern Athletic Conference | Northern - Norfolk State; Southern - Florida A&M | Charles Sikes, Savannah State | Claudell Clark, Norfolk State | 2015 Mid-Eastern Athletic Conference baseball tournament | Arthur W. Perdue Stadium • Salisbury, MD | Florida A&M |
| Missouri Valley Conference | Missouri State | Kevin Kaczmarski, Evansville | Keith Guttin, Missouri State | 2015 Missouri Valley Conference baseball tournament | Eck Stadium • Wichita, KS | Missouri State |
| Mountain West Conference | Nevada | Grant Fennell, Nevada | T. J. Bruce, Nevada | 2015 Mountain West Conference baseball tournament | William Peccole Park • Reno, NV | San Diego State |
| Northeast Conference | Bryant | Nick Dini, Wagner | Jim Carone, Wagner | 2015 Northeast Conference baseball tournament | Senator Thomas J. Dodd Memorial Stadium • Norwich, CT | Sacred Heart |
| Ohio Valley Conference | Southeast Missouri State | Chris Robinson, Morehead State | Mike McGuire, Morehead State | 2015 Ohio Valley Conference baseball tournament | The Ballpark at Jackson • Jackson, TN | Morehead State |
| Pac-12 Conference | UCLA | Scott Kingery, Arizona | John Savage, UCLA | No tournament, regular season champion earns auto bid | | |
| Patriot League | Navy | Sean Trent, Navy | Paul Kostacopoulos, Navy | 2015 Patriot League baseball tournament | Campus sites | Lehigh |
| Southeastern Conference | East - Vanderbilt West - LSU | Andrew Benintendi, Arkansas | Paul Mainieri, LSU | 2015 Southeastern Conference baseball tournament | Hoover Metropolitan Stadium • Hoover, AL | Florida |
| Southern Conference | Mercer | Kyle Lewis, Mercer | Craig Gibson, Mercer | 2015 Southern Conference baseball tournament | Joseph P. Riley Jr. Park • Charleston, SC | Mercer |
| Southland Conference | Southeastern Louisiana | Jacob Seward, Southeastern Louisiana | Matt Riser, Southeastern Louisiana | 2015 Southland Conference baseball tournament | Constellation Field • Sugar Land, TX | Houston Baptist |
| Southwestern Athletic Conference | East- Alabama State; West - Arkansas–Pine Bluff | Melvin Rodriguez, Jackson State | Mitch Hill, Alabama A&M | 2015 Southwestern Athletic Conference baseball tournament | Wesley Barrow Stadium • New Orleans, LA | Texas Southern |
| The Summit League | Oral Roberts | Anthony Sequeira, Oral Roberts | Bob Herold, Omaha | 2015 Summit League baseball tournament | Sioux Falls Stadium • Sioux Falls, South Dakota | Oral Roberts |
| Sun Belt Conference | South Alabama | Blake Trahan, Louisiana–Lafayette | Mark Calvi, South Alabama | 2015 Sun Belt Conference baseball tournament | Riddle–Pace Field • Troy, AL | Louisiana–Lafayette |
| West Coast Conference | San Diego | Kyle Holder, San Diego | Rich Hill, San Diego | 2015 West Coast Conference baseball tournament | Banner Island Ballpark • Stockton, CA | Pepperdine |
| Western Athletic Conference | Grand Canyon | Jensen Park, Northern Colorado | Bill Kernen, Cal State Bakersfield | 2015 Western Athletic Conference baseball tournament | Sloan Park • Mesa, AZ | Cal State Bakersfield |

== College World Series ==
The 2015 College World Series will begin on June 13 in Omaha, Nebraska.

First round
Virginia | 5
Arkansas | 3
5 | Miami (FL) | 3
4 | Florida | 15
Arkansas | 3
5 | Miami (FL) | 4
2 | LSU | 3
7 | TCU | 10
Cal State Fullerton | 3
Vanderbilt | 4
2 | LSU | 5
Cal State Fullerton | 3

Second round
Virginia | 1
4 | Florida | 0
5 | Miami (FL) | 2
4 | Florida | 10
7 | TCU | 0
Vanderbilt | 1
2 | LSU | 4
7 | TCU | 8

Semifinals
Virginia | 5 | 5
4 | Florida | 10 | 4
Vanderbilt | 7 | –
7 | TCU | 1 | –

Championship series
Virginia | 1 | 3 | 4
Vanderbilt | 5 | 0 | 2

== Coaching changes ==
This table lists programs that changed head coaches at any point from the first day of the 2015 season until the day before the first day of the 2016 season.

| Team | Former coach | Interim coach | New coach | Reason |
|---|---|---|---|---|
| Arizona | Andy Lopez | | Jay Johnson | Retired |
| Auburn | Sunny Golloway | | Butch Thompson | Fired |
| Baylor | Steve Smith | | Steve Rodriguez | Fired |
| Cal State Bakersfield | Bill Kernen | | Bob Macaluso | Retired |
| Clemson | Jack Leggett | | Monte Lee | Fired |
| College of Charleston | Monte Lee | | Matt Heath | Resigned to accept coaching position at Clemson. |
| Eastern Illinois | Jim Schmitz | | Jason Anderson | Fired |
| Eastern Kentucky | Jason Stein | | Edwin Thompson | Fired |
| James Madison | Spanky McFarland | | Marlin Ikenberry | Retired |
| Nevada | Jay Johnson | | T. J. Bruce | Resigned to accept coaching position at Arizona. |
| Northwestern | Paul Stevens | | Spencer Allen | Retired |
| Pacific | Ed Sprague Jr. | | Mike Neu | Fired |
| Pepperdine | Steve Rodriguez | | Rick Hiretensteiner | Resigned to accept coaching position at Baylor. |
| Portland | Chris Sperry | | Geoff Loomis | Fired |
| Washington State | Donnie Marbut | | Marty Lees | Fired |
| Western Kentucky | Matt Myers | | John Pawlowski | Fired |

== See also ==
- 2015 College Baseball All-America Team
- 2015 NCAA Division I baseball rankings
- 2015 NCAA Division I baseball tournament
