= 2015 Louisiana–Monroe Warhawks baseball team =

Baseball team

2015 Louisiana–Monroe Warhawks baseball
- Conference: Sun Belt Conference
- Record: 20–21 (7–11 Sun Belt)
- Head coach: Bruce Peddie (1st season)
- Hitting coach: Eric Folmar
- Pitching coach: Larry Thomas
- Home stadium: Warhawk Field

2015 Sun Belt Conference baseball standings
	Conf.						Overall
Team	W		L		T	PCT	W		L		T	PCT
South Alabama ‍†‍‍	19	–	9	–	0	.679	37	–	20	–	0	.649
Troy ‍‍‍	18	–	10	–	0	.643	30	–	25	–	0	.545
No. 16 Louisiana–Lafayette ‍‍‡‍^{y}	18	–	11	–	0	.621	42	–	23	–	0	.646
Georgia Southern ‍‍‍	18	–	12	–	0	.600	30	–	27	–	0	.526
Georgia State ‍‍‍	15	–	13	–	0	.536	30	–	27	–	0	.526
Texas State ‍‍‍	14	–	16	–	0	.467	24	–	30	–	1	.445
UT Arlington ‍‍‍	14	–	16	–	0	.467	24	–	32	–	0	.429
Arkansas State ‍‍‍	12	–	17	–	0	.414	27	–	30	–	0	.474
Arkansas–Little Rock ‍‍‍	12	–	17	–	0	.414	16	–	33	–	0	.327
Louisiana–Monroe ‍‍‍	12	–	18	–	0	.400	25	–	29	–	0	.463
Appalachian State ‍‍‍	8	–	21	–	0	.276	17	–	36	–	0	.321
† – Conference champion ‡ – Tournament champion y – Invited to the NCAA tournament As of June 11, 2015; Rankings from Collegiate Baseball

The 2015 Louisiana–Monroe Warhawks baseball team represented the University of Louisiana at Monroe in the 2015 NCAA Division I baseball season. The Warhawks played their home games in Warhawk Field.

== Personnel ==
=== Roster ===
2015 Louisiana–Monroe Warhawks baseball team
Players
Coaches

#	Pos.	Name	B/T	Height	Weight	Year	Previous school	Home town
1	INF	Brian Barefoot	R/R	5 ft 10 in (1.78 m)	180 lb (82 kg)	Fr	Neville	Monroe, LA
2	INF	Josh Faciane	R/R	5 ft 10 in (1.78 m)	200 lb (91 kg)	RS Jr	Jesuit	New Orleans, LA
3	OF	Vincent Dellocono	L/L	6 ft 0 in (1.83 m)	205 lb (93 kg)	RS So	Episcopal	Baton Rouge, LA

Head coach

Gary Henderson

Assistant coach(es)

Brad Bohannon
Brian Green
Keith Vorhoff

Legend

- (C) Team captain
- (S) Suspended
- (I) Ineligible
- Injured
- Current redshirt

Roster
Last update: January 16, 2014

== Schedule and results ==
2015 Louisiana-Monroe Warhawks baseball game log
Regular season

February (5–3)
Date	Opponent	Site/stadium	Score	Win	Loss	Save	Attendance	Overall record	Sun Belt record
Warhawk Classic Presented by Fieldhouse Bar and Grill
February 13	Indiana State	Warhawk Field	6–11	J. McKinney (1–0)	B. Bell (0–1)	R. Keaffaber (1)	1,086	0–1	–
February 14	Central Arkansas	Warhawk Field	4–10	B. Stitch (1–0)	A. Hermeling (0–1)	None	1,203	0–2	–
February 15	Grambling State	Warhawk Field	7–3	K. Curtis (1–0)	A. Wilson (0–1)	None	1,054	1–2	–
Regular season
February 20	Stephen F. Austin	Warhawk Field	5–0	A. Hermeling (1–1)	C. Gann (1–1)	None	1,504	2–2	–
February 20	Stephen F. Austin	Warhawk Field	10–3	B. Bell (1–1)	D. Mangham (0–2)	None	1,504	3–2	–
February 22	Stephen F. Austin	Warhawk Field	7–8	G. Page (1–0)	A. Herrera (0–1)	Wiedenfeld (2)	760	3–3	–
February 24	Southern Mississippi	Warhawk Field	PPD	—	—	—	—	3–3	–
February 28	Sam Houston State	Warhawk Field	6–0	A. Hermeling (2–1)	A. Godail (0–1)	None	1,506	4–3	–
February 28	Sam Houston State	Warhawk Field	7–5	B. Bell (2–1)	S. Odem (0–2)	K. Curtis (1)	1,506	5–3	–

March (7–8)
Date	Opponent	Site/stadium	Score	Win	Loss	Save	Attendance	Overall record	Sun Belt record
March 1	Sam Houston State	Warhawk Field	9–1	T. Setzer (1–0)	L. Boyd (1–1)	None	771	6–3	—
March 3	@ Northwestern State	H. Alvin Brown–C. C. Stroud Field	0–7	E. Tidwell (1–2)	B. Bouchey (0–1)	None	642	6–4	—
March 6	@ Texas State	Bobcat Ballpark	3–4	L. Humpal (2–1)	A. Hermeling (2–2)	C. Geisler (2)	1,211	6–5	0–1
March 7	@ Texas State	Bobcat Ballpark	1–5	S. Grist (1–1)	B. Bell (2–2)	None	1,725	6–6	0–2
March 7	@ Texas State	Bobcat Ballpark	7–4	J. Leone (1–0)	M. Parsons (0–2)	A. Herrera (1)	1,725	7–6	1–2
March 11	Grambling State	Warhawk Field	11–4	B. Bouchey (1–1)	C. Mckinney (1–2)	None	213	8–6	—
March 14	Mississippi Valley State	Warhawk Field	L 2–4	—	—	—	—	8–7	—
March 14	Mississippi Valley State	Warhawk Field	W 7–0	—	—	—	—	9–7	—
March 15	Mississippi Valley State	Warhawk Field	W 11–1	—	—	—	—	10–7	—
March 17	@ Grambling State	Wilbert Ellis Field	W 7–0	—	—	—	—	11–7	—
March 20	@ Appalachian State	Jim and Bettie Smith Stadium	L 0–7	—	—	—	—	11–8	1–3
March 21	@ Appalachian State	Jim and Bettie Smith Stadium	L 5–7	—	—	—	—	11–9	1–4
March 22	@ Appalachian State	Jim and Bettie Smith Stadium	W 10–2	—	—	—	—	12–9	2–4
March 24	@ Southeastern Louisiana	Pat Kenelly Diamond	L 6–7	—	—	—	—	12–10	—
March 27	South Alabama	Warhawk Field	L 4–12	—	—	—	—	12–11	2–5
March 28	South Alabama	Warhawk Field	L 4–9	—	—	—	—	12–12	2–6
March 29	South Alabama	Warhawk Field	W 4–3	—	—	—	—	13–12	3–6

April (0–0)
Date	Opponent	Site/stadium	Score	Win	Loss	Save	Attendance	Overall record	Sun Belt record
April 1	Louisiana Tech	Warhawk Field	6:00 PM	—	—	—	—	—	—
April 3	UT–Arlington	Warhawk Field	6:00 PM	—	—	—	—	—	3–7
April 4	UT–Arlington	Warhawk Field	6:00 PM	—	—	—	—	—	4–7
April 5	UT–Arlington	Warhawk Field	1:00 PM	—	—	—	—	—	5–7
April 7	McNeese State	Warhawk Field	6:00 PM	—	—	—	—	—	—
April 8	Nicholls State	Warhawk Field	1:00 PM	—	—	—	—	—	—
April 8	McNeese State	Warhawk Field	6:00 PM	—	—	—	—	—	—
April 10	@ Georgia State	GSU Baseball Complex	5:00 PM	—	—	—	—	—	—
April 11	@ Georgia State	GSU Baseball Complex	1:00 PM	—	—	—	—	—	—
April 12	@ Georgia State	GSU Baseball Complex	12:00 PM	—	—	—	—	—	—
April 14	@ Arkansas–Pine Bluff	Torii Hunter Baseball Complex	4:00 PM	—	—	—	—	—	—
April 15	Northwestern State	Warhawk Field	6:00 PM	—	—	—	—	—	—
April 17	Arkansas State	Warhawk Field	6:00 PM	—	—	—	—	—	—
April 18	Arkansas State	Warhawk Field	6:00 PM	—	—	—	—	—	—
April 19	Arkansas State	Warhawk Field	1:00 PM	—	—	—	—	—	—
April 21	@ Southern Miss	Pete Taylor Park	6:00 PM	—	—	—	—	—	—
April 22	@ Louisiana Tech	J.C. Love Field	6:00 PM	—	—	—	—	—	—
April 24	@ Georgia Southern	J. I. Clements Stadium	5:00 PM	—	—	—	—	—	—
April 25	@ Georgia Southern	J. I. Clements Stadium	1:00 PM	—	—	—	—	—	—
April 26	@ Georgia Southern	J. I. Clements Stadium	12:00 PM	—	—	—	—	—	—
April 29	Nicholls State	Warhawk Field	6:00 pm	—	—	—	—	—	—

May (0–0)
Date	Opponent	Site/stadium	Score	Win	Loss	Save	Attendance	Overall record	Sun Belt record
May 1	Troy	Warhawk Field	6:00 pm	—	—	—	—	—	—
May 2	Troy	Warhawk Field	6:00 pm	—	—	—	—	—	—
May 3	Troy	Warhawk Field	1:00 pm	—	—	—	—	—	—
May 8	@ Arkansas–Little Rock	Gary Hogan Field	6:00 pm	—	—	—	—	—	—
May 9	@ Arkansas–Little Rock	Gary Hogan Field	2:00 pm	—	—	—	—	—	—
May 10	@ Arkansas–Little Rock	Gary Hogan Field	1:00 pm	—	—	—	—	—	—
May 14	Louisiana–Lafayette	Warhawk Field	6:00 pm	—	—	—	—	—	—
May 15	Louisiana–Lafayette	Warhawk Field	6:00 pm	—	—	—	—	—	—
May 16	Louisiana–Lafayette	Warhawk Field	1:00 pm	—	—	—	—	—	—

== Rankings ==
Ranking movements Legend: — = Not ranked
	Week																			
Poll	Pre	1	2	3	4	5	6	7	8	9	10	11	12	13	14	15	16	17	18	Final
Coaches'	—	—*																		
Baseball America	—																			
Collegiate Baseball^	—																			
NCBWA†	—																			

^ Collegiate Baseball ranked 40 teams in their preseason poll, but only ranked 30 teams weekly during the season.
† NCBWA ranks 30 teams in their preseason poll, but only ranks 25 teams weekly during the season.
* A new poll was not released for this week, so for comparison purposes, the previous week's ranking is inserted in this week's slot.
