= 2015 Georgia State Panthers baseball team =

American college baseball season

2015 Georgia State Panthers baseball
- Conference: Sun Belt Conference
- Record: 30–27 (15–13 SBC)
- Head coach: Greg Frady (8th season)
- Home stadium: GSU Baseball Complex

2015 Sun Belt Conference baseball standings
	Conf.						Overall
Team	W		L		T	PCT	W		L		T	PCT
South Alabama ‍†‍‍	19	–	9	–	0	.679	37	–	20	–	0	.649
Troy ‍‍‍	18	–	10	–	0	.643	30	–	25	–	0	.545
No. 16 Louisiana–Lafayette ‍‍‡‍^{y}	18	–	11	–	0	.621	42	–	23	–	0	.646
Georgia Southern ‍‍‍	18	–	12	–	0	.600	30	–	27	–	0	.526
Georgia State ‍‍‍	15	–	13	–	0	.536	30	–	27	–	0	.526
Texas State ‍‍‍	14	–	16	–	0	.467	24	–	30	–	1	.445
UT Arlington ‍‍‍	14	–	16	–	0	.467	24	–	32	–	0	.429
Arkansas State ‍‍‍	12	–	17	–	0	.414	27	–	30	–	0	.474
Arkansas–Little Rock ‍‍‍	12	–	17	–	0	.414	16	–	33	–	0	.327
Louisiana–Monroe ‍‍‍	12	–	18	–	0	.400	25	–	29	–	0	.463
Appalachian State ‍‍‍	8	–	21	–	0	.276	17	–	36	–	0	.321
† – Conference champion ‡ – Tournament champion y – Invited to the NCAA tournament As of June 11, 2015; Rankings from Collegiate Baseball

The 2015 Georgia State Panthers baseball team represented Georgia State University in the 2015 NCAA Division I baseball season. The Panthers played their home games at the GSU Baseball Complex.

== Personnel ==
=== 2015 Roster ===
2015 Georgia State Panthers roster
Pitchers: 5 Matt Rose – Junior; 6 Michael Lelko – Junior; 13 Garrett Ford – Junior; 17 Jerry Stuckey – Senior; 18 Conner Stanley – Senior; 20 Nathan Bates – Junior; 24 Kenny Anderson – Senior; 26 Wayne Wages – Junior; 29 Alex Prescott – Senior; 31 Kevin Burgee – Senior; NA Noah Albury – Freshman; NA Logan Barnette – Freshman; NA Marc-André Habeck – Junior; NA Alex Hegner – (redshirt) Junior; NA Liam Henry – Freshman; NA Tanner Love – Junior; NA Clayton Payne – Junior; NA Cole Uvila – Junior; NA Will White – Freshman	Catchers: 8 Joey Roach – Junior; 14 Trae Sweeting – Sophomore; NA Nick Bradshaw – (redshirt) Freshman; NA Evan Leyva – Junior; Infielders: 7 Caden Bailey – Senior; 15 David Levy – Senior; NA Andy Burnette – Freshman; NA Sam Few – (redshirt) Junior; NA Justin Jones – Freshman; NA Jack Thompson – Freshman	Outfielders: 4 James Clements – Junior; 16 Ryan Blanton – Sophomore; NA Mitchell Benson – Freshman; NA Rhett Harper – Freshman; NA Will Johnson – Freshman; NA Luke Leonard – Freshman; NA Gerrio Rahming – Freshman; NA Cam Sperry – Junior

=== Coaching staff ===
2015 Georgia State Panthers baseball coaching staff
- 10 Greg Frady – Head coach – 8th year
- 48 Edwin Thompson – Recruiting Coordinator – 4th year
- 25 Willie Stewart – Assistant coach – 4th year

== Schedule ==
2015 Georgia State Panthers baseball game log
Regular season
February

#	Date	Opponent	Venue	Score	Overall record	SBC record
1	February 13	Fordham	GSU Baseball Complex	11–3	1–0	–
2	February 14	Liberty	GSU Baseball Complex	7–10	1–1	–
3	February 15	St. Johns	GSU Baseball Complex	1–9	1–2	–
4	February 17	Mercer	Macon, GA	14–1	2–2	–
5	February 20	UMass Lowell	GSU Baseball Complex	5–3	3–2	–
6	February 21	UMass Lowell	GSU Baseball Complex	3–5	3–3	–
7	February 21	UMass Lowell	GSU Baseball Complex	11–9	4–3	–
8	February 22	UMass Lowell	GSU Baseball Complex	2–9	4–4	–
9	February 25	Georgia Tech	Atlanta, GA	Cancelled	–	–
10	February 27	Ohio	GSU Baseball Complex	10–8	5–4	–
11	February 28	Ohio	GSU Baseball Complex	11–4	6–4	–

March

#	Date	Opponent	Venue	Score	Overall record	SBC record
12	March 1	Ohio	GSU Sports Arena	3–1	7–4	–
13	March 4	Georgia	Athens, GA	2–4	7–5	–
14	March 6	Eastern Michigan	GSU Baseball Complex	8–5	8–5	–
15	March 7	Eastern Michigan	GSU Baseball Complex	5–4	9–5	–
16	March 8	Eastern Michigan	GSU Baseball Complex	1–3	9–6	–
17	March 11	Kennesaw State	GSU Baseball Complex	13–3	10–6	–
18	March 13	Arkansas State	Jonesboro, AR	5–4	11–6	1–0
19	March 14	Arkansas State	Jonesboro, AR	6–3	12–6	2–0
20	March 15	Arkansas State	Jonesboro, AR	Cancelled	–	–
21	March 17	Florida A&M	GSU Baseball Complex	12–11	13–6	2–0
22	March 18	Savannah State	Savannah, GA	3–7	13–7	2–0
23	March 20	Louisiana–Lafayette	GSU Baseball Complex	7–6	14–7	3–0
24	March 21	Louisiana-Lafayette	GSU Baseball Complex	1–10	14–8	3–1
25	March 21	Louisiana–Lafayette	GSU Baseball Complex	2–3	14–9	3–2
26	March 23	De Pauw	GSU Baseball Complex	2–3	14–10	3–2
27	March 24	Alabama A&M	GSU Baseball Complex	1–3	14–11	3–2
28	March 24	Alabama A&M	GSU Baseball Complex	9–10	14–12	3–2
29	March 27	Texas–Arlington	Arlington, TX	5–2	15–12	4–2
30	March 28	Texas–Arlington	Arlington, TX	6–4	16–12	5–2
31	March 29	Texas–Arlington	Arlington, TX	2–1	17–12	6–2

April

#	Date	Opponent	Venue	Score	Overall record	SBC record
32	April 1	Georgia Tech	GSU Baseball Complex	3–6	17–13	6–2
33	April 3	Arkansas–Little Rock	GSU Baseball Complex	13–8	18–13	7–2
34	April 4	Arkansas–Little Rock	GSU Baseball Complex	12–5	19–13	8–2
35	April 5	Arkansas–Little Rock	GSU Baseball Complex	2–4	19–14	8–3
36	April 8	Auburn	Auburn, AL	2–4	19–15	8–3
37	April 11	Louisiana–Monroe	GSU Baseball Complex	7–6	20–15	9–3
38	April 11	Louisiana–Monroe	GSU Baseball Complex	5–3	21–15	10–3
39	April 12	Louisiana–Monroe	GSU Baseball Complex	9–0	22–15	11–3
40	April 14	Mercer	GSU Baseball Complex	Cancelled	–	–
41	April 17	Appalachian State	Boone, NC	4–3	23–15	12–3
42	April 18	Appalachian State	Boone, NC	15–13	24–15	13–3
43	April 19	Appalachian State	Boone, NC	Cancelled	–	–
44	April 21	Oglethorpe University	GSU Baseball Complex	6–2	25–15	13–3
45	April 22	Savannah State	GSU Baseball Complex	10–5	26–15	13–3
46	April 24	South Alabama	Mobile, AL	0–8	26–16	13–4
47	April 25	South Alabama	Mobile, AL	1–2	26–17	13–5
48	April 26	South Alabama	Mobile, AL	2–7	26–18	13–6

May

#	Date	Opponent	Venue	Score	Overall record	SBC record
49	May 1	Texas State	GSU Baseball Complex	2–12	26–19	13–7
50	May 2	Texas State	GSU Baseball Complex	10–5	27–19	14–7
51	May 3	Texas State	GSU Baseball Complex	5–8	27–20	14–8
52	May 6	Kennesaw State	Kennesaw, GA	7–4	28–20	14–8
53	May 8	Troy	Troy, AL	2–4	28–21	14–9
54	May 9	Troy	Troy, AL	2–3	28–22	14–10
55	May 10	Troy	Troy, AL	0–2	28–23	14–11
56	May 14	Georgia Southern	GSU Baseball Complex	6–2	29–23	15–11
57	May 15	Georgia Southern	GSU Baseball Complex	3–4	29–24	15–12
58	May 16	Georgia Southern	GSU Baseball Complex	2–3	29–25	15–13

Postseason
SBC Baseball Tournament

#	Date	Opponent	Site/stadium	Score	Overall record	SBC record	SBC Tournament record
59	May 20	Georgia Southern	Troy, AL	3–2	30–25	15–13	
60	May 21	South Alabama	Troy, AL	4–14	30–26	15–13	
61	May 22	Arkansas State	Troy, AL	2–6	30–27	15–13	
