= 2015 Sun Belt Conference baseball tournament =

- Teams: 8
- Format: Double-elimination
- Finals site: Riddle–Pace Field; Troy, AL
- Champions: Louisiana–Lafayette (3rd title)

2015 Sun Belt Conference baseball standings
	Conf.						Overall
Team	W		L		T	PCT	W		L		T	PCT
South Alabama ‍†‍‍	19	–	9	–	0	.679	37	–	20	–	0	.649
Troy ‍‍‍	18	–	10	–	0	.643	30	–	25	–	0	.545
No. 16 Louisiana–Lafayette ‍‍‡‍^{y}	18	–	11	–	0	.621	42	–	23	–	0	.646
Georgia Southern ‍‍‍	18	–	12	–	0	.600	30	–	27	–	0	.526
Georgia State ‍‍‍	15	–	13	–	0	.536	30	–	27	–	0	.526
Texas State ‍‍‍	14	–	16	–	0	.467	24	–	30	–	1	.445
UT Arlington ‍‍‍	14	–	16	–	0	.467	24	–	32	–	0	.429
Arkansas State ‍‍‍	12	–	17	–	0	.414	27	–	30	–	0	.474
Arkansas–Little Rock ‍‍‍	12	–	17	–	0	.414	16	–	33	–	0	.327
Louisiana–Monroe ‍‍‍	12	–	18	–	0	.400	25	–	29	–	0	.463
Appalachian State ‍‍‍	8	–	21	–	0	.276	17	–	36	–	0	.321
† – Conference champion ‡ – Tournament champion y – Invited to the NCAA tournament As of June 11, 2015; Rankings from Collegiate Baseball

The 2015 Sun Belt Conference baseball tournament was held at Riddle–Pace Field on the campus of the Troy University in Troy, Alabama from May 20 to May 24, 2015. The tournament again used a double-elimination format. The winner of the tournament earned the Sun Belt Conference's automatic bid to the 2015 NCAA Division I baseball tournament.

== Seeding ==
The top eight teams (based on conference results) from the conference earn invites to the tournament. The teams will be seeded based on conference winning percentage, and will then play a two bracket, double-elimination tournament. The winner of each bracket will play a championship final.

== Results ==
First round
1	South Alabama	6
8	Arkansas State	2
4	Georgia Southern	2
5	Georgia State	3
8	Arkansas State	6
4	Georgia Southern	1
3	Louisiana–Lafayette	7
6	Texas State	8
2	Troy	5
7	Texas–Arlington	13
3	Louisiana–Lafayette	12
2	Troy	8

Second round
1	South Alabama	14
5	Georgia State	4
8	Arkansas State	6
5	Georgia State	2
6	Texas State	10
7	Texas–Arlington	2
3	Louisiana–Lafayette	5
7	Texas–Arlington	1

Semifinals
1	South Alabama	7	–
8	Arkansas State	3	–
6	Texas State	0	2
3	Louisiana–Lafayette	3	6

Final
1	South Alabama	1
3	Louisiana–Lafayette	5
