= 2015 Atlantic 10 Conference baseball tournament =

American college baseball tournament

- Teams: 7
- Format: Double-elimination
- Finals site: Barcroft Park; Arlington, VA
- Champions: VCU (1st title)
- Winning coach: Shawn Stiffler (1st title)
- MVP: Darian Carpenter (VCU)

2015 Atlantic 10 Conference baseball standings
	Conf.						Overall
Team	W		L		T	PCT	W		L		T	PCT
Saint Louis ‍†‍‍	16	–	8	–	0	.667	35	–	21	–	0	.625
Richmond ‍‍‍	15	–	9	–	0	.625	28	–	25	–	0	.528
Rhode Island ‍‍‍	15	–	9	–	0	.625	26	–	25	–	1	.510
No. 15 VCU ‍‍‡‍^{y}	14	–	10	–	0	.583	40	–	25	–	0	.615
Davidson ‍‍‍	14	–	10	–	0	.583	28	–	22	–	0	.560
George Washington ‍‍‍	13	–	10	–	0	.565	32	–	22	–	0	.593
Fordham ‍‍‍	13	–	11	–	0	.542	22	–	32	–	0	.407
La Salle ‍‍‍	12	–	12	–	0	.500	24	–	27	–	1	.471
George Mason ‍‍‍	12	–	12	–	0	.500	23	–	27	–	1	.461
UMass ‍‍‍	12	–	12	–	0	.500	16	–	27	–	0	.372
Saint Joseph's ‍‍‍	11	–	12	–	0	.478	21	–	28	–	0	.429
Dayton ‍‍‍	5	–	19	–	0	.208	16	–	38	–	0	.296
St. Bonaventure ‍‍‍	3	–	21	–	0	.125	16	–	28	–	2	.370
† – Conference champion ‡ – Tournament champion y – Invited to the NCAA tournament As of June 30, 2015; Rankings from Collegiate Baseball

The 2015 Atlantic 10 Conference baseball tournament took place from May 20 through 23. The top seven regular season finishers of the league's twelve teams met in the double-elimination tournament held at Barcroft Park, the home field of George Washington in Arlington, Virginia. VCU won their first title as a member of the conference to earn the conference's automatic bid to the 2015 NCAA Division I baseball tournament.

== Seeding and format ==
The tournament used the same format adopted in 2014, with the top seven finishers from the regular season seeded one through seven. The top seed, Saint Louis, received a single bye while remaining seeds played on the first day.

Team	W	L	Pct.	GB	Seed	Tiebreaker
Saint Louis	16	8	.667	–	1	
Rhode Island	15	9	.625	1	2	2–1 vs. Richmond
Richmond	15	9	.625	1	3	1–2 vs. Rhode Island
Davidson	14	10	.583	2	4	1–2 vs. Saint Louis
VCU	14	10	.583	2	5	0–3 vs. Saint Louis
George Washington	13	10	.565	2.5	6	
Fordham	13	11	.542	3	7	
La Salle	12	12	.500	4	–	
George Mason	12	12	.500	4	–	
UMass	12	12	.500	4	–	
Saint Joseph's	11	12	.478	4.5	–	
Dayton	5	19	.208	11	–	
St. Bonaventure	3	21	.125	13	–	

== Results ==
Upper round 1	Upper round 2	Upper final	Final
1	Saint Louis	3
5	VCU	14
4	Davidson	0
5	VCU	11
5	VCU	8
2	Rhode Island	2
2	Rhode Island	7
7	Fordham	3
2	Rhode Island	2
3	Richmond	1
3	Richmond	4
6	George Washington	1
5	VCU	5	–
2	Rhode Island	3	–
Lower round 1	Lower round 2	Lower round 3	Lower final
6	George Washington	7
7	Fordham	5	3	Richmond	2	4	Davidson	3
6	George Washington	11	6	George Washington	1	2	Rhode Island	4
4	Davidson	2
4	Davidson	10
1	Saint Louis	2

== All-Tournament Team ==
The following players were named to the All-Tournament Team.

Name	School
Michael Morman	Richmond
Robbie Metz	George Washington
Brandon Chapman	George Washington
Ryan Lowe	Davidson
Lee Miller	Davidson
Ryan Olmo	Rhode Island
Jordan Powell	Rhode Island
Steve Moyers	Rhode Island
Jojo Howie	VCU
Matt Davis	VCU
Walker Haymaker	VCU
Darian Carpenter	VCU

=== Most Outstanding Player ===
Darian Carpenter was named Tournament Most Valuable Player. Carpenter was a first baseman for VCU.
