= 2015 Louisiana–Lafayette Ragin' Cajuns baseball team =

American college baseball season

2015 Louisiana–Lafayette Ragin' Cajuns baseball

Sun Belt Conference Tournament champions Houston Regionals Champions Baton Rouge Super Regionals Appearance
- Conference: Sun Belt Conference

Ranking
- Coaches: No. 16
- Record: 42-23 (18-11 SBC)
- Head coach: Tony Robichaux (21st season)
- Assistant coaches: Anthony Babineaux; Jeremy Talbot
- Home stadium: M. L. Tigue Moore Field

2015 Sun Belt Conference baseball standings
	Conf.						Overall
Team	W		L		T	PCT	W		L		T	PCT
South Alabama ‍†‍‍	19	–	9	–	0	.679	37	–	20	–	0	.649
Troy ‍‍‍	18	–	10	–	0	.643	30	–	25	–	0	.545
No. 16 Louisiana–Lafayette ‍‍‡‍^{y}	18	–	11	–	0	.621	42	–	23	–	0	.646
Georgia Southern ‍‍‍	18	–	12	–	0	.600	30	–	27	–	0	.526
Georgia State ‍‍‍	15	–	13	–	0	.536	30	–	27	–	0	.526
Texas State ‍‍‍	14	–	16	–	0	.467	24	–	30	–	1	.445
UT Arlington ‍‍‍	14	–	16	–	0	.467	24	–	32	–	0	.429
Arkansas State ‍‍‍	12	–	17	–	0	.414	27	–	30	–	0	.474
Arkansas–Little Rock ‍‍‍	12	–	17	–	0	.414	16	–	33	–	0	.327
Louisiana–Monroe ‍‍‍	12	–	18	–	0	.400	25	–	29	–	0	.463
Appalachian State ‍‍‍	8	–	21	–	0	.276	17	–	36	–	0	.321
† – Conference champion ‡ – Tournament champion y – Invited to the NCAA tournament As of June 11, 2015; Rankings from Collegiate Baseball

The 2015 Louisiana–Lafayette Ragin' Cajuns baseball team represented the University of Louisiana at Lafayette in the 2016 NCAA Division I baseball season. The Ragin' Cajuns played their home games at M. L. Tigue Moore Field and were led by twenty-first year head coach Tony Robichaux

== Preseason ==
=== Sun Belt Conference Coaches Poll ===
The Sun Belt Conference Coaches Poll was released on January 28, 2015. Louisiana-Lafayette was picked to finish first in the Sun Belt with 114 votes and 8 first-place votes.

Coaches poll
Predicted finish	Team	Votes (1st place)
1	Louisiana-Lafayette	114 (3)
2	Texas State	94 (1)
3	Arkansas State	87
4	UT Arlington	80
5	Troy	78
6	Georgia Southern	77 (2)
7	South Alabama	71
8	Georgia State	35
9	Louisiana-Monroe	34
10	Arkansas-Little Rock	31
11	Appalachian State	25

=== Preseason All-Sun Belt team ===
- David Owen (ARST, JR, Pitcher)
- Kevin Hill (USA, SR, Pitcher)
- Lucas Humpal (TXST, JR, Pitcher)
- Marc Skinner (TROY, SO, Pitcher)
- Joey Roach (GSU, JR, Catcher)
- Matt Burgess (ARST, JR, 1st Base)
- Darien McLemore (UTA, JR, 2nd Base)
- Blake Trahan (ULL, JR, Shortstop)
- Matt Rose (GSU, JR, 3rd Base)
- Aaron Mizell (GASO, SR, Outfield)
- Dylan Butler (ULL, SR, Outfield)
- Cole Gleason (USA, SR, Outfield)
- David Hall (TROY, SR, Designated Hitter)
- Cory Geisler (TXST, JR, Utility)

==== 2015 Sun Belt Preseason Player of the Year ====
- Blake Trahan (ULL, JR, Shortstop)

== Roster ==
2015 Louisiana-Lafayette Ragin' Cajuns roster
Pitchers: 1 Connor Toups - Sophomore; 5 Riley Cooper - Sophomore; 11 Trace Guidry - Redshirt Freshman; 14 Greg Milhorn - Senior; 18 Evan Guillory - Freshman; 19 Colton Lee - Junior; 24 Eric Carter - Junior; 26 Jevin Huval - Junior; 27 Nick Zaunbrecher - Junior; 29 Chris Charpentier - Sophomore; 31 Wyatt Marks - Freshman; 32 Logan Stoelke - Freshman; 34 Will Bacon - Junior; 35 Ty Ewart - Freshman; 38 Blaine Suehs - Freshman; 40 Dylan Moore - Freshman; 41 Reagan Bazar - Sophomore; 42 Orynn Veillon - Freshman; 43 Alex Shelton - Freshman; 45 Trey Jeans - Freshman	Catchers: 6 Nick Thurman - Junior; 22 Evan Powell - Senior; Infielders: 4 Blake Trahan - Junior; 9 Tyler Girouard - Senior; 10 Kennon Fontenot - Freshman; 12 Joe Robbins - Junior; 13 Brenn Conrad - Junior; 20 Greg Davis - Senior; 23 Stefan Trosclair - Junior; 28 Gunner Leger - Freshman; Outfielders: 2 Adam Angelle - Junior; 7 Kyle Clement - Junior; 8 Derek Herrington - Junior; 15 Dylan Butler - Senior; 17 Brian Mills - Junior; 33 Jamarius Williams - Freshman

=== Coaching staff ===
2015 Louisiana-Lafayette Ragin' Cajuns coaching staff
- Tony Robichaux – Head Coach – 21st year
- Anthony Babineaux – Associate Head Coach – 21st year
- Jeremy Talbot – Assistant Head Coach – 1st year
- Daniel Freeman – Volunteer Assistant Coach – 1st year
- Chris Domingue – Director of Baseball Operations – 13th year
- Brian Covington – Clubhouse Manager
- Jeff Patton – Field Manager
- Connor Romero – Field Manager
- Matt Skelton – Field Manager

== Schedule and results ==
Legend
	Louisiana-Lafayette win
	Louisiana-Lafayette loss
	Postponement
**Bold**	Louisiana-Lafayette team member

2015 Louisiana–Lafayette Ragin' Cajuns baseball game log
Regular season (34-18)

February (5-5)
Date	Opponent	Rank	Site/stadium	Score	Win	Loss	Save	TV	Attendance	Overall record	SBC record
Feb. 13	at UTSA		Roadrunner Field • San Antonio, TX	**L** 5-8	Kirby (1-0)	**Charpentier** (0-1)	Herbelin (1)	None	833	0-1	
Feb. 14	at UTSA		Roadrunner Field • San Antonio, TX	**W** 8-2	**Guillory** (1-0)	Trabanino (0-1)	None	None	612	1-1	
Feb. 15	at UTSA		Roadrunner Field • San Antonio, TX	**L** 5-11	Herbelin (1-0)	**Carter** (0-1)	None	None	567	1-2	
Feb. 18	at Northwestern State		H. Alvin Brown–C. C. Stroud Field • Natchitoches, LA	**W** 7-3	**Leger** (1-0)	Tanner (0-1)	**Lee** (1)	None	804	2-2	
Feb. 20	Stony Brook		M. L. Tigue Moore Field • Lafayette, LA	**W** 7-3	**Cooper** (1-0)	Lee (0-1)	**Lee** (2)	Ragin' Cajuns Digital Network	3,374	3–2	
Feb. 21	Stony Brook		M. L. Tigue Moore Field • Lafayette, LA	**L** 1-4	Zamora (1-0)	**Charpentier** (0-2)	**Rodliff** (1)	Ragin' Cajuns Digital Network		3–3	
Feb. 21	Stony Brook		M. L. Tigue Moore Field • Lafayette, LA	**W** 2-1	**Moore** (1-0)	Corniel (0-1)	None	Ragin' Cajuns Digital Network	2,737	4-3	
Feb. 24	McNeese State		M. L. Tigue Moore Field • Lafayette, LA	**L** 4-5 (11 inn)	Day (1-0)	**Stoelke** (0-1)	Briggs (1)	Ragin' Cajuns Digital Network	2,213	4-4	
Feb. 27	at No. 25 Alabama		Sewell–Thomas Stadium • Tuscaloosa, AL	**L** 4-6	Castillo (1-0)	**Bacon** (0-1)	None	SECN+	2,343	4-5	
Feb. 28	at No. 25 Alabama		Sewell–Thomas Stadium • Tuscaloosa, AL	**W** 6-5	**Cooper** (2-0)	Burrows (0-2)	**Lee** (2)	SECN+	2,863	5-5	

March (10-6)
Date	Opponent	Rank	Site/stadium	Score	Win	Loss	Save	TV	Attendance	Overall record	SBC record
Mar. 1	at No. 25 Alabama		Sewell-Thomas Stadium • Tuscaloosa, AL	**W** 14-2	**Leger** (2-0)	Bramblett (2-1)	None	SECN+	2,738	6-5	
Mar. 4	Northwestern State		M. L. Tigue Moore Field • Lafayette, LA	**W** 8-2	**Toups** (1-0)	Shaffer (0-1)	None	Ragin' Cajuns Digital Network	3,988	7-5	
Mar. 6	Troy		M. L. Tigue Moore Field • Lafayette, LA	**W** 6-5 (11 inn)	**Moore** (2-0)	McGowan (0-1)	None	ESPN3	3,904	8-5	1-0
Mar. 7	Troy		M. L. Tigue Moore Field • Lafayette, LA	**W** 6-2	**Bacon** (1-1)	Bennett (2-1)	None	Ragin' Cajuns Digital Network	4,412	9-5	2-0
Mar. 8	Troy		M. L. Tigue Moore Field • Lafayette, LA	**W** 10-5	**Marks** (1-0)	McGowan (0-2)	**Moore** (1)	Ragin' Cajuns Digital Network	4,272	10-5	3-0
Mar. 10	New Orleans		M. L. Tigue Moore Field • Lafayette, LA	Postponed due to impending weather in Lafayette. Game rescheduled to April 29.							
Mar. 11	at Southern		Lee-Hines Field • Baton Rouge, LA	Postponed due to field conditions and expected rain in Baton Rouge. Game rescheduled to April 8.							
Mar. 14	at Arkansas-Little Rock		Gary Hogan Field • Little Rock, AR	Game cancelled due to poor field conditions and heavy rains in Little Rock.							
Mar. 15	at Arkansas-Little Rock		Gary Hogan Field • Little Rock, AR	**L** 4-5	Allen (2-1)	**Lee** (0-1)	None	None	257	10–6	3-1
Mar. 15	at Arkansas-Little Rock		Gary Hogan Field • Little Rock, AR	**L** 6-7	Brownmiller (1-2)	**Moore** (2-1)	None	None	257	10-7	3-2
Mar. 20	at Georgia State		GSU Baseball Complex • Atlanta, GA	**L** 6-7 (10 inn)	Burgee (2-0)	**Lee** (0-2)	None	None	188	10-8	3–3
Mar. 21	at Georgia State		GSU Baseball Complex • Atlanta, GA	**W** 10-1	**Leger** (3-0)	Anderson (2-2)	None	None	259	11-8	4-3
Mar. 21	at Georgia State		GSU Baseball Complex • Atlanta, GA	**W** 3-2	**Milhorn** (1-0)	Uvila (0-3)	**Moore** (2)	None	259	12–8	5-3
Mar. 24	at McNeese State		Joe Miller Ballpark • Lake Charles, LA	**W** 6-5	**Charpentier** (1-2)	Briggs (1-1)	**Moore** (3)	None	1,837	13-8	
Mar. 25	Nichols State		M. L. Tigue Moore Field • Lafayette, LA	**L** 1-3	Stapler (1-0)	**Toups** (1-1)	Holmes (9)	Ragin' Cajuns Digital Network	4,100	13–9	
Mar. 27	Arkansas State		M. L. Tigue Moore Field • Lafayette, LA	**L** 4-10	Zuber (3-2)	**Leger** (3-1)	Kibler (3)	Ragin' Cajuns Digital Network	4,089	13-10	5–4
Mar. 28	Arkansas State		M. L. Tigue Moore Field • Lafayette, LA	**W** 9-6	**Charpentier** (2-2)	Lee )0-1)	None	MyAcadianaTV/ESPN3	4,271	14-10	6-4
Mar. 29	Arkansas State		M. L. Tigue Moore Field • Lafayette, LA	**W** 3-0	**Guillory** (2-0)	Owen (2-3)	**Marks** (1)	Ragin' Cajuns Digital Network	4,101	15-10	7-4
Wally Pontiff Classic
Mar. 31	vs. No. 3 LSU		Zephyr Field • Metairie, LA	**L** 6-8	Reynolds (2-0)	**Toups** (1-2)	Stallings (11)	CST	10,853	15-11	

April (14-4)
Date	Opponent	Rank	Site/stadium	Score	Win	Loss	Save	TV	Attendance	Overall record	SBC record
Apr. 3	Georgia Southern		M. L. Tigue Moore Field • Lafayette, LA	**L** 1-2	Challenger (3-0)	**Leger** (3-2)	Richman (2)	Ragin' Cajuns Digital Network	4,033	15-12	7-5
Apr. 4	Georgia Southern		M. L. Tigue Moore Field • Lafayette, LA	**L** 4-7	Sheppard (3-2)	**Milhorn** (1-1)	Brown (7)	ESPN3	4,192	15-13	7-6
Apr. 5	Georgia Southern		M. L. Tigue Moore Field • Lafayette, LA	**W** 5-1	**Guillory** (3-0)	Simmons (1-2)	**Moore** (4)	Ragin' Cajuns Digital Network	3,823	16-13	8-6
Apr. 7	No. 22 Houston		M. L. Tigue Moore Field • Lafayette, LA	**W** 6-5	**Marks** (2-0)	Garza (0-2)	None	MyAcadianaTV/ESPN3	3,885	17-13	
Apr. 8	at Southern		Lee-Hines Field • Baton Rouge, LA	**W** 14-1	**Carter** (1-1)	George (1-4)	None	CST	134	18-13	
Apr. 11	Jackson State		M. L. Tigue Moore Field • Lafayette, LA	**W** 7-6 (11 inn)	**Moore** (3-1)	Cahill (2-1)	None	Ragin' Cajuns Digital Network		19-13	
Apr. 11	Jackson State		M. L. Tigue Moore Field • Lafayette, LA	**W** 15-2	**Marks** (3-0)	Colon (4-1)	None	Ragin' Cajuns Digital Network	3,975	20-13	
Apr. 12	Jackson State		M. L. Tigue Moore Field • Lafayette, LA	**W** 7-2	**Lee** (1-2)	Wilson (2-3)	None	Ragin' Cajuns Digital Network	3,915	21-13	
Apr. 14	Southeastern Louisiana		M. L. Tigue Moore Field • Lafayette, LA	**L** 3-5	Bethel (1-0)	**Lee** (1-3)	Sceroler (5)	MyAcadianaTV/ESPN3	3,778	21-14	
Apr. 18	at Texas State		Bobcat Ballpark • San Marcos, TX	**W** 11-3	**Leger** (4-2)	Humpal (4-4)	**Bacon** (1)	None		22-14	9-6
Apr. 18	at Texas State		Bobcat Ballpark • San Marcos, TX	**L** 4-10	Grist (3-3)	**Charpentier** (2-3)	Giovanoni (1)	None	2,004	22-15	9-7
Apr. 19	at Texas State		Bobcat Ballpark • San Marcos, TX	**W** 13-3	**Marks** (4-0)	Hallonquist (4-1)	None	None	1,520	23-15	10-7
Apr. 21	at Southeastern Louisiana		Pat Kenelly Diamond at Alumni Field • Hammond, LA	**W** 7-2	**Bacon** (2-1)	Cashman (3-4)	None	CST	1,669	24-15	
Apr. 22	Southern		M. L. Tigue Moore Field • Lafayette, LA	**W** 5-4	**Stoelke** (1-1)	Myles (0-3)	**Moore** (5)	Ragin' Cajuns Digital Network	3,850	25-15	
Apr. 24	UT Arlington		M. L. Tigue Moore Field • Lafayette, LA	**W** 5-0	**Leger** (5-2)	Nack (3-4)	None	Ragin' Cajuns Digital Network	3,852	26–15	11-7
Apr. 25	UT Arlington		M. L. Tigue Moore Field • Lafayette, LA	**W** 3-2	**Charpentier** (3-3)	Moreland (3-2)	None	MyAcadianaTV/ESPN3	4,073	27–15	12-7
Apr. 26	UT Arlington		M. L. Tigue Moore Field • Lafayette, LA	**W** 4-1	**Marks** (5-0)	Kuhnel (2-2)	**Moore** (6)	Ragin' Cajuns Digital Network	4,165	28-15	13-7
Apr. 28	at Nicholls State		Ben Meyer Diamond at Ray E. Didier Field • Thibodaux, LA	Game postponed to May 12 due to poor field conditions caused by heavy rains in Thibodaux.							
Apr. 29	New Orleans		M. L. Tigue Moore Field • Lafayette, LA	**W** 6-3	**Charpentier** (4-3)	Medine (0-3)	**Moore** (7)	Ragin' Cajuns Digital Network	3,795	29-15	

May (5-5)
Date	Opponent	Rank	Site/stadium	Score	Win	Loss	Save	TV	Attendance	Overall record	SBC record
May 1	at Appalachian State		Beaver Field at Jim and Bettie Smith Stadium • Boone, NC	**L** 1-2	Thurber (4-8)	**Leger** (5-3)	None	None	233	29-16	13-8
May 2	at Appalachian State		Beaver Field at Jim and Bettie Smith Stadium • Boone, NC	**W** 20-6	**Bacon** (3-1)	Holden (0-4)	None	None	712	30-16	14-8
May 3	at Appalachian State		Beaver Field at Jim and Bettie Smith Stadium • Boone, NC	**L** 4-7	Springs (4-1)	**Marks** (5-1)	Whaley (1)	None	684	30-17	14-9
May 8	South Alabama		M. L. Tigue Moore Field • Lafayette, LA	**L** 0-5	Hill (9-0)	**Leger** (5-4)	None	Ragin' Cajuns Digital Network	4,408	30-18	14-10
May 9	South Alabama		M. L. Tigue Moore Field • Lafayette, LA	**L** 3-4	Taylor (6-1)	**Bacon** (3-2)	None	MyAcadianaTV/ESPN3	4,411	30-19	14-11
May 10	South Alabama		M. L. Tigue Moore Field • Lafayette, LA	**W** 3-2	**Milhorn** (2-1)	Gates (4-3)	**Moore** (8)	Ragin' Cajuns Digital Network	4,010	31-19	15-11
May 12	at Nicholls State		Ben Meyer Diamond at Ray E. Didier Field • Thibodaux, LA	**L** 4-5	Petty (4-1)	**Moore** (3-2)	None	None	957	31-20	
May 14	at Louisiana-Monroe		Warhawk Field • Monroe, LA	**W** 10-3	**Leger** (6-4)	Hermeling (4-7)	None	None	1,504	32-20	16-11
May 16	at Louisiana-Monroe		Warhawk Field • Monroe, LA	**W** 5-4	**Bacon** (4-2)	Setzer (6-3)	**Moore** (9)	None		33-20	17-11
May 16	at Louisiana-Monroe		M. L. Tigue Moore Field • Lafayette, LA	**W** 6-4	**Lee** (2-3)	Leone (1-4)	**Bazar** (1)	None	1,783	34-20	18-11

Postseason (8-3)

SBC Tournament (5-1)
Date	Opponent	Seed/Rank	Site/stadium	Score	Win	Loss	Save	TV	Attendance	Overall record	SBC record
May 20	vs. (6) Texas State	(3)	Riddle-Pace Field • Troy, AL	**L** 7-8	Giovanoni (2-1)	**Moore** (3-3)	Geisler (3)	None		34-21	
May 21	vs. (2) Troy	(3)	Riddle-Pace Field • Troy, AL	**W** 12-8	**Milhorn** (3-1)	Bennett (9-4)	**Bacon** (2)	None	967	35-21	
May 22	vs. (7) UT Arlington	(3)	Riddle-Pace Field • Troy, AL	**W** 5-1	**Guillory** (4-0)	Vassar (2-7)	**Charpentier** (1)	None	476	36-21	
May 23	vs. (6) Texas State	(3)	Riddle-Pace Field • Troy, AL	**W** 3-0	**Marks** (6-1)	Geisler (2-2)	**Moore** (10)	ESPN3		37-21	
May 23	vs. (6) Texas State	(3)	Riddle-Pace Field • Troy, AL	**W** 6-2	**Bacon** (5-2)	Humpal (5-7)	**Moore** (11)	ESPN3	652	38-21	
May 24	vs. (1) South Alabama	(3)	Riddle-Pace Field • Troy, AL	**W** 5-1	**Milhorn** (4-1)	Taylor (6-3)	None	ESPN3	955	39-21	

NCAA Division I Baseball Championship (3-2)
Date	Opponent	Seed/Rank	Site/stadium	Score	Win	Loss	Save	TV	Attendance	Overall record	SBC record
Houston Regionals
May 29	vs. No. 19 Rice		Cougar Field • Houston, TX	**W** 7-6	**Bacon** (6-2)	Orewiler (5-2)	**Moore** (12)	ESPN3	2,839	40-21	
May 31	at No. 13 Houston		Cougar Field • Houston, TX	**W** 2-1	**Milhorn** (5-1)	Fletcher (2-1)	None	ESPN3	3,792	41-21	
Jun. 1	vs. No. 19 Rice		Cougar Field • Houston, TX	**W** 5-2	**Guillory** (5-0)	Stephens (6-5)	**Moore** (13)	ESPN3	2,713	42-21	
Baton Rouge Super Regionals
Jun. 6	at No. 1 LSU		Alex Box Stadium, Skip Bertman Field • Baton Rouge, LA	**L** 3-4	Bugg (1-2)	**Bacon** (6-3)	None	ESPN2	11,179	42-22	
Jun. 7	at No. 1 LSU		Alex Box Stadium, Skip Bertman Field • Baton Rouge, LA	**L** 3-6	Poche' (9-1)	**Leger** (6-5)	None	ESPN2	11,795	42-23	

Schedule source:

- Rankings are based on the team's current ranking in the Collegiate Baseball poll.

== Houston Regional ==
Houston Regional Teams
(1) Houston Cougars	(2) Rice Owls	(3) Louisiana–Lafayette Ragin' Cajuns	(4) Houston Baptist Huskies

First Round
1	Houston	6
4	Houston Baptist	4
3	Louisiana–Lafayette	7
2	Rice	6
Lower round 1
4	Houston Baptist	1
2	Rice	3

Semi-Finals
1	Houston	1
3	Louisiana–Lafayette	2
Lower final
2	Rice	3
1	Houston	2^{20}

Finals
3	Louisiana–Lafayette
2	Rice

== Baton Rouge Super Regional ==
Baton Rouge Super Regional Teams
(1) LSU Tigers	(2) Louisiana–Lafayette Ragin' Cajuns

Game 1
Rank	Team	Score
	Louisiana-Lafayette	3
2	LSU	4

Game 2
Rank	Team	Score
	Louisiana-Lafayette	3
2	LSU	6
