= 2015 VCU Rams baseball team =

American college baseball season

2015 VCU Rams baseball

A10 Tournament champions NCAA Dallas Regional champions

NCAA Coral Gables Super Regional, L, 0–2
- Conference: Atlantic 10 Conference

Ranking
- Coaches: No. 15
- AP: No. 18
- Record: 40–25 (14–10 A-10)
- Head coach: Shawn Stiffler (4th season)
- Assistant coaches: Kurt Elbin (3rd season); Steve Hay (1st season); ML Morgan (1st season)
- Home stadium: The Diamond

2015 Atlantic 10 Conference baseball standings
	Conf.						Overall
Team	W		L		T	PCT	W		L		T	PCT
Saint Louis ‍†‍‍	16	–	8	–	0	.667	35	–	21	–	0	.625
Richmond ‍‍‍	15	–	9	–	0	.625	28	–	25	–	0	.528
Rhode Island ‍‍‍	15	–	9	–	0	.625	26	–	25	–	1	.510
No. 15 VCU ‍‍‡‍^{y}	14	–	10	–	0	.583	40	–	25	–	0	.615
Davidson ‍‍‍	14	–	10	–	0	.583	28	–	22	–	0	.560
George Washington ‍‍‍	13	–	10	–	0	.565	32	–	22	–	0	.593
Fordham ‍‍‍	13	–	11	–	0	.542	22	–	32	–	0	.407
La Salle ‍‍‍	12	–	12	–	0	.500	24	–	27	–	1	.471
George Mason ‍‍‍	12	–	12	–	0	.500	23	–	27	–	1	.461
UMass ‍‍‍	12	–	12	–	0	.500	16	–	27	–	0	.372
Saint Joseph's ‍‍‍	11	–	12	–	0	.478	21	–	28	–	0	.429
Dayton ‍‍‍	5	–	19	–	0	.208	16	–	38	–	0	.296
St. Bonaventure ‍‍‍	3	–	21	–	0	.125	16	–	28	–	2	.370
† – Conference champion ‡ – Tournament champion y – Invited to the NCAA tournament As of June 30, 2015; Rankings from Collegiate Baseball

The 2015 VCU Rams baseball team was the program's 45th season fielding a varsity baseball program, and their third season the Atlantic 10 Conference.

Led by Shawn Stiffler for his third season, the Rams had their most successful baseball season in program history. The Rams advanced to the NCAA Super Regional for the first time ever, and won their first ever Atlantic 10 Conference baseball tournament. It was the program's return to the NCAA tournament for the first time since 2010.

== Personnel ==
=== 2015 roster ===
2015 VCU Rams Roster
Pitchers: 13 - Matt Lees - Junior; 14 - Logan Kanuik - Senior; 16 - Michael Carpenter - Sophomore; 20 - Seth Greene - RS Senior; 23 - Matt Jamer - Freshman; 30 - Brian Goodling - Freshman; 31 - Tyler Buckley - Junior; 32 - Daniel Concepcion - Junior; 33 - Dan Black - Sophomore; 34 - Matt Blanchard - Junior; 35 - Heath Dwyer - Junior; 37 - Thomas Gill - Junior; 38 - Jordan Storey - RS Senior; 40 - JoJo Howie - Junior	Infielders: 4 - Joey Cujas - Junior; 10 - Tom Crimi - Senior; 15 - Darian Carpenter - Freshman; 17 - Matt Davis - Freshman; 18 - Bryce Lee - Senior; 25 - Vimael Machin - Junior; 26 - Trevor Marino - Senior; 27 - Shane Dressler - Freshman; Utility: 8 - Logan Farrar - Freshman	Catchers: 7 - Chris Ayers - Senior; 11 - Walker Haymaker - Sophomore; 19 - Brett Hileman - Freshman; 21 - Nick Octavi - Senior; 24 - Joe Bugas - Freshman; Outfielders: 1 - James Bunn - Sophomore; 2 - Bill Cullen - Senior; 3 - Landon Prentiss - Senior; 9 - Cody Acker - Sophomore; 12 - Alex Gransback - Freshman

== Schedule ==
2015 VCU Rams baseball game log
Regular season (33–22)

February (2–5)
Date	Opponent	Rank	Site/stadium	Score	Win	Loss	Save	Attendance	Overall record	A10 record
Winston-Salem Series
February 13	vs. Georgetown*		David F. Couch Ballpark; Winston-Salem, North Carolina	W 6–3	Dwyer (1–0)	Hollenback (0–1)	Concepcion (1)	128	1–0	—
February 14	at Wake Forest*		David F. Couch Ballpark	L 0–1	Dunshee (1–0)	Howie (0–1)	Fossas (1)	718	1–1	—
February 17	at Virginia*		Davenport Field; Charlottesville, Virginia	Postponed (inclement weather)						—
Myrtle Beach Invitational
February 21	vs. Bucknell*		Griffith Field; Myrtle Beach, South Carolina	L 1–5	Hough (2–0)	Dwyer (1–1)	Castellani (1)	35	1–2	—
February 21 (DH)	vs. Bucknell		Griffith Field	L 4–6	Hammond (1–0)	Blanchard (0–1)	none	43	1–3	—
February 22	vs. Bucknell		Griffith Field	L 2–3	Gambon (1–0)	Howie (0–2)	Rafferty (1)	82	1–4	—
February 27	vs. Pitt*		Griffith Field	W 5–4	Concepcion (1–0)	Harris (0–1)	none	127	2–4	—
February 28	vs. Pitt*		Griffith Field	L 1–6	Sandefur (1–0)	Blanchard (0–2)	none	105	2–5	—

March (13–7)
Date	Opponent	Rank	Site/stadium	Score	Win	Loss	Save	Attendance	Overall record	A10 record
Myrtle Beach Invitational
March 1	vs. Pitt*		Griffith Field	W 3–2	Lees (1–0)	Mattson (0–1)	none	96	3–5	—
March 4	at No. 16 North Carolina*		Boshamer Stadium; Chapel Hill, North Carolina	L 5–6	Raquet (1–0)	Thompson (0–1)	none	872	3–6	—
March 6	at Jacksonville*		John Sessions Stadium; Jacksonville, Florida	L 1–2	Disch (1–0)	Gill (0–1)	none	85	3–7	—
March 7	at Jacksonville*		John Sessions Stadium	W 4–3	Howie (1–2)	Tanner (1–2)	Concepcion (2)	179	4–7	—
March 8	at Jacksonville*		John Sessions Stadium	W 5–4	Dwyer (2–1)	Russell (1–3)	Lees (1)	188	5–7	—
March 10	Penn*		The Diamond; Richmond, Virginia	W 12–5	Thompson (1–1)	Reitcheck (1–1)	none	237	6–7	—
March 11	Penn*		The Diamond	W 5–1	Blanchard (1–2)	Hammonds (0–1)	none	181	7–7	—
March 13	Monmouth*		The Diamond	L 0–3	Hunt (1–2)	Howie (1–3)	none	204	7–8	—
Central Virginia Classic
March 15	James Madison*		The Diamond	W 7–1	Dwyer (3–1)	Bradshaw (1–1)	none	373	8–8	—
March 16	Minnesota*		The Diamond	W 11–4	Lees (2–0)	Thonvold (0–1)	none	258	9–8	—
March 17	Monmouth*		The Diamond	L 0–7	Trimarco (1–2)	Thompson (1–2)	none	227	9–9	—
March 20	at East Carolina*		Clark–LeClair Stadium; Greenville, North Carolina	W 4–3	Lees (3–0)	Boyd (2–4)	Concepcion (3)	2,069	10–9	—
March 21	at East Carolina*		Clark–LeClair Stadium	L 3–9	Morgan (4–0)	Gill (0–2)	none	2,862	10–10	—
March 22	at East Carolina*		Clark–LeClair Stadium	W 3–2	Lees (4–0)	Boyd (2–5)	Concepcion (4)	2,295	11–10	—
March 24	VMI*		The Diamond	W 18–0	Thompson (2–2)	Eagle (0–2)	none	606	12–10	—
March 25	Longwood*		The Diamond	W 8–1	Buckley (4–0)	Catlin (3–1)	none	404	13–10	—
March 27	UMass		The Diamond	W 16–3	Howie (2–3)	LeBlanc (1–2)	none	307	14–10	1–0
March 28	UMass		The Diamond	L 2–3	Moloney (2–1)	Concepcion (1–1)	Mackintosh (1)	343	14–11	1–1
March 29	UMass		The Diamond	W 8–0	Dwyer (4–1)	Grant (1–1)	none	327	15–11	2–1
Duel at the Diamond
March 31	Virginia*; Duel at the Diamond		The Diamond	L 3–5	Casey (2–1)	Concepcion (1–2)	Sborz (8)	3,233	15–12	—

April (11–6)
Date	Opponent	Rank	Site/stadium	Score	Win	Loss	Save	Attendance	Overall record	A10 record
April 4	at Dayton		Woerner Field; Dayton, Ohio	W 5–2	Lees (5–0)	Dant (1–6)	Concepcion (5)	188	16–12	3–1
April 4	at Dayton (DH)		Woerner Field	L 2–5	Buettgen (2–3)	Howie (2–4)	none	188	16–13	3–2
April 5	at Dayton		Woerner Field	W 6–0	Dwyer (5–1)	Horn (1–2)	Concepcion (6)	151	17–13	4–2
Old Dominion–VCU series
April 8	at Old Dominion*		Bud Metheny Baseball Complex; Norfolk, Virginia	W 10–2	Thompson (3–2)	Matheson (1–2)	none	591	18–13	—
George Mason–VCU series
April 10	George Mason*		The Diamond	L 1–8	Kalish (3–3)	Blanchard (1–3)	none	307	18–14	4–3
April 11	George Mason*		The Diamond	W 9–1	Howie (3–4)	Williams (4–4)	none	399	19–14	5–3
April 12	George Mason*		The Diamond	L 6–7	Zombro (4–1)	Lees (5–1)	Tobin (4)	407	19–15	5–4
April 14	at VMI*		Gray–Minor Stadium; Lexington, Virginia	Canceled (inclement weather)					19–15	—
April 15	at Longwood*		Bolding Stadium; Farmville, Virginia	W 11–5	Thompson (4–2)	Kuebbing (1–4)	none	154	20–15	—
April 17	at Saint Joseph's		Smithson Field; Merion, Pennsylvania	W 15–9	Buckley (2–0)	Vanderslice (3–5)	none	217	21–15	6–4
April 18	at Saint Joseph's		Smithson Field	W 4–2	Howie (4–4)	Manion (2–3)	Concepcion (7)	400	22–15	7–4
April 19	at Saint Joseph's		Smithson Field	L 1–5	August (2–0)	Dwyer (5–2)	none	278	22–16	7–5
April 21	Maryland*		The Diamond	W 2–1	Concepcion (2–2)	Morris (3–2)	none	622	23–16	—
April 22	at Maryland*		Turtle Smith Stadium; College Park, Maryland	W 3–1	Stine (1–0)	Bloom (0–1)	Concepcion (8)	237	24–16	—
April 24	Rhode Island		Hugh Stephens Field; Ashland, Virginia	L 3–7	Distasio (4–4)	Howie (4–5)	none	190	24–17	7–6
April 25	Rhode Island		Hugh Stephens Field	L 3–6	Wilson (6–0)	Lees (5–2)	Moyers (1)	146	24–18	7–7
April 26	Rhode Island		Hugh Stephens Field	W 7–0	Dwyer (6–2)	Kawlewski (0–2)	Concepcion (9)	201	25–18	8–7
April 29	Norfolk State*		The Diamond	W 14–6	Gill (1–2)	Parmentier (2–1)	none	494	26–18	—

May
Date	Opponent	Rank	Site/stadium	Score	Win	Loss	Save	Attendance	Overall record	A10 record
May 1	at Saint Louis		Billiken Sports Center; St. Louis, Missouri	L 1–7					26–19	8–8
May 2	at Saint Louis		Billiken Sports Center	L 2–3					26–20	8–9
May 3	at Saint Louis		Billiken Sports Center	L 9–12					26–21	8–10
May 5	at Norfolk State*		Marty L. Miller Field; Norfolk, Virginia	L 3–6					26–22	—
May 7	Fordham		The Diamond	W 7–2					27–22	9–10
May 8	Fordham		The Diamond	W 2–1					28–22	10–10
May 9	Fordham		The Diamond	W 3–2					29–22	11–10
Keydog Classic
May 12	vs. Old Dominion*		War Memorial Stadium; Hampton, Virginia	W 9–3					30–22	—
May 14	at St. Bonaventure		Fred Handler Park; Olean, New York	W 12–2					31–22	12–10
May 15	at St. Bonaventure		Fred Handler Park	W 11–0					32–22	13–10
May 16	at St. Bonaventure		Fred Handler Park	W 7–2					33–22	14–10

Postseason (7–3)

Atlantic 10 tournament (4–0)
Date	Opponent	Rank	Site/stadium	Score	Win	Loss	Save	Attendance	Overall record	A10T record
May 20	vs. (4) Davidson	(5)	Barcroft Park; Arlington, Virginia	W 11–0					34–22	1–0
May 21	vs. (1) Saint Louis	(5)	Barcroft Park	W 14–3					35–22	2–0
May 22	vs. (2) Rhode Island	(5)	Barcroft Park	W 8–2					36–22	3–0
May 23	vs. (2) Rhode Island	(5)	Barcroft Park	W 5–3					37–22	4–0

NCAA Dallas Regional (3–1)
Date	Opponent	Rank	Site/stadium	Score	Win	Loss	Save	Attendance	Overall record	NCAAT record
May 29	at No. 14 (1) Dallas Baptist*	(4)	Horner Ballpark; Dallas, Texas	W 7–2					38–22	1–0
May 31	vs. No. 18 (2) Oregon State*	(4)	Horner Ballpark	W 5–1					39–22	2–0
June 1	at No. 15 (1) Dallas Baptist*	No. 18 (4)	Horner Ballpark	L 1–2					39–23	2–1
June 1	at No. 15 (1) Dallas Baptist*	No. 18 (4)	Horner Ballpark	W 3–1					40–23	3–1

NCAA Coral Gables Super Regional (0–2)
Date	Opponent	Rank	Site/stadium	Score	Win	Loss	Save	Attendance	Overall record	NCAAT record
June 5	at No. 5 (5) Miami (FL)*	No. 15	Alex Rodriguez Park at Mark Light Field; Coral Gables, Florida	L 2–3					40–24	3–2
June 6	at No. 5 (5) Miami (FL)*	No. 15	Alex Rodriguez Park at Mark Light Field; Coral Gables, Florida	L 3–10					40–25	3–3

Legend: = Win = Loss = Canceled
Bold =VCU team member
Rankings are based on the team's current ranking in the Collegiate Baseball poll.

== Rankings ==
Ranking movements Legend: ██ Increase in ranking ██ Decrease in ranking — = Not ranked RV = Received votes
	Week																		
Poll	Pre	1	2	3	4	5	6	7	8	9	10	11	12	13	14	15	16	17	Final
Coaches'	—	—*	—	—	—	—	—	—	—	—	—	—	—	—	—	—	19	19	19
Baseball America	—	—	—	—	—	—	—	—	—	—	—	—	—	—	—	—	17	16	16
Collegiate Baseball^	—	—	—	—	—	—	—	—	—	—	—	—	—	—	—	RV	15	15	15
NCBWA†	—	—	—	—	—	—	—	—	—	—	—	—	—	—	—	RV	18	17	17

^ Collegiate Baseball ranked 40 teams in their preseason poll, but only ranked 30 teams weekly during the season.
† NCBWA ranks 30 teams in their preseason poll, but only ranks 25 teams weekly during the season.
* A new poll was not released for this week, so for comparison purposes, the previous week's ranking is inserted in this week's slot.
