= 2015 Summit League baseball tournament =

- Teams: 4
- Format: Double-elimination
- Finals site: Sioux Falls Stadium; Sioux Falls, SD
- Champions: Oral Roberts (16th title)
- Winning coach: Ryan Folmar (1st title)
- MVP: Derrian James (Oral Roberts)

2015 Summit League baseball standings
	Conf.				Overall
Team	W		L	PCT	W		L	PCT
Oral Roberts ‍‍‍	22	–	5	.815	35	–	14	.714
South Dakota State ‍‍‍	17	–	10	.630	31	–	20	.608
IPFW ‍‍‍	12	–	15	.444	25	–	23	.521
Omaha † ‍‍‍	11	–	16	.407	18	–	28	.391
Western Illinois ‍‍‍	10	–	17	.370	17	–	30	.362
North Dakota State ‍‍‍	9	–	18	.333	18	–	28	.391
‡ – Tournament champion † Ineligible for league and NCAA tournaments due to transition from Division II; As of May 12, 2015; Rankings from Collegiate Baseball

The 2015 Summit League baseball tournament took place from May 20 through 23. The top four regular season finishers of the league's six teams met in the double-elimination tournament held at Sioux Falls Stadium in Sioux Falls, South Dakota. Oral Roberts won the tournament and earned the Summit League's automatic bid to the 2015 NCAA Division I baseball tournament.

== Seeding ==
The top four finishers from the regular season—not including Omaha, which is ineligible for the tournament as the 2015 season is the last in its transition from Division II to Division I—will be seeded one through four based on conference winning percentage. The teams will then play a double-elimination tournament.

== Results ==
First round
1	Oral Roberts	4
4	North Dakota State	2
2	South Dakota State	7
3	IPFW	3
Lower round 1
4	North Dakota State	5
3	IPFW	15

Semi-finals
1	Oral Roberts	9
2	South Dakota State	3
Lower final
3	IPFW	6
2	South Dakota State	5

Finals
1	Oral Roberts	6
3	IPFW	0
