= 2015 Virginia Cavaliers baseball team =

American college baseball season

2015 Virginia Cavaliers baseball

National champions Lake Elsinore Regional champions Charlottesville Super Regional champions
- Conference: Atlantic Coast Conference
- Record: 44–24 (15–15 ACC)
- Head coach: Brian O'Connor (12th season)
- Assistant coaches: Kevin McMullan (12th season); Karl Kuhn (12th season); Matt Kirby (4th season)
- Home stadium: Davenport Field

2015 Atlantic Coast Conference baseball standings
	Conf.				Overall
Team	W		L	PCT	W		L	PCT
Atlantic
No. 10 Louisville ^{x}‍‍‍^{y}	25	–	5	.833	47	–	18	.723
No. 26 Notre Dame ‍‍‍^{y}	17	–	13	.567	37	–	23	.617
No. 12 Florida State ‍‍‡‍^{y}	17	–	13	.567	44	–	21	.677
Clemson ‍‍‍^{y}	16	–	13	.552	32	–	29	.525
NC State ‍‍‍^{y}	15	–	14	.517	36	–	23	.610
Wake Forest ‍‍‍	12	–	18	.400	27	–	26	.509
Boston College ‍‍‍	10	–	19	.345	27	–	27	.500
Coastal
No. 6 Miami (FL) ^{x}‍‍‍^{y}	22	–	8	.733	50	–	16	.758
No. 1 Virginia ‍‍‍^{y}	15	–	15	.500	44	–	24	.647
North Carolina ‍‍‍	13	–	16	.448	34	–	24	.586
Virginia Tech ‍‍‍	13	–	16	.448	27	–	27	.500
Georgia Tech ‍‍‍	13	–	17	.433	32	–	23	.582
Duke ‍‍‍	10	–	19	.345	31	–	22	.585
Pittsburgh ‍‍‍	9	–	21	.300	20	–	32	.385
x – Division champion ‡ – Tournament champion y – Invited to the NCAA tournament As of June 30, 2015; Rankings from Collegiate Baseball

The 2015 Virginia Cavaliers baseball team represented the University of Virginia during the 2015 NCAA Division I baseball season. The Cavaliers played their home games at Davenport Field as a member of the Atlantic Coast Conference. They were led by head coach Brian O'Connor, in his 12th season at Virginia.

2015 was a tough regular season for the 2014 NCAA runner-up. The Cavaliers slogged through a disappointing and injury-filled regular season. By winning 5 of its last 6 ACC games, the Cavs managed to cobble together a .500 ACC record, qualifying them for a play in game at the ACC tournament. At the tournament they won the play in game against Georgia Tech and then promptly lost the last three games.

Virginia was given an NCAA tournament berth, as a No. 3 regional seed, and the Cavs took full advantage. They swept through the Lake Elsinore (Calif.) Regional, and because Maryland, also a #3 seed, had won its regional, were able to host a Super Regional, which the Cavaliers swept as well.

In Omaha the Cavaliers won the 2015 College World Series, highlighted by winning two of three games against Florida before ousting Vanderbilt in three games in the CWS Finals. Virginia's season was notable for the Cavaliers continuing to battle in spite of numerous setbacks. That never give up attitude was evident in its post season as well: UVA scored the go-ahead run in the fifth inning or later in each of their 10 postseason wins.

== Previous season ==
In 2014, the Cavaliers finished the season 2nd in the ACC's Coastal Division with a record of 47–14, 22–8 in conference play. They qualified for the 2014 Atlantic Coast Conference baseball tournament and were eliminated in pool play. They qualified for the 2014 NCAA Division I baseball tournament as the #3 overall national seed, and were placed in the Charlottesville Regional, of which they were hosts. Also, in the regional were Bucknell, Liberty, and Arkansas. The Cavaliers defeated Bucknell, 10–1, in the opening game, and then shut out Arkansas, 3–0, to advance to the regional final. There, they again defeated Arkansas, this time by a score of 9–2. In the Super Regional, the Cavaliers fell in the opening game to ACC foe Maryland, 4–5. However, they rebounded and defeated the Terrapins in the next two games, 7–3 and 11–2, to advance to the College World Series.

In the College World Series, Virginia's first game was against Ole Miss, whom the Cavaliers defeated, 2–1. In the second round, Virginia defeated #7 national seed TCU, 3–2, in 15 innings. In the semifinals, the Cavaliers again defeated Ole Miss, this time by a score of 4–1. The Cavaliers advanced to the College World Series finals to play Vanderbilt. In the first game of the finals, the Commodores won by a score of 9–8. Virginia then rebounded to defeat Vanderbilt, 7–2, in game two. In a winner-take-all game three, Vanderbilt prevailed, 3–2, to be crowned national champions.

== Personnel ==
=== Roster ===
2015 Virginia Cavaliers roster
Pitchers: 6 – Matt Doughty – Freshman; 7 – Adam Haseley – Freshman; 11 – Bennett Sousa – Freshman; 13 – Alec Bettinger – Sophomore; 14 – Derek Casey – Freshman; 16 – Tommy Doyle – Freshman; 17 – Jack Roberts – (redshirt) Freshman; 19 – Nathan Kirby – Junior; 20 – Brandon Waddell – Junior; 27 – Josh Sborz – Junior; 28 – Kevin Doherty – Junior; 29 – Riley Cummins – Freshman; 32 – Mark Ostbye – Freshman; 33 – Connor Jones – Sophomore; 34 – Riley Wilson – Freshman; 35 – David Rosenberger – Junior	Catchers: 8 – Robbie Coman – Junior; 21 – Matt Thaiss – Sophomore; Infielders: 2 – John La Prise – Junior; 4 – Ernie Clement – Freshman; 9 – Kenny Towns – Senior; 10 – Pavin Smith – Freshman; 12 – Charlie Cody – Freshman; 18 – Justin Novak – Freshman; 22 – Daniel Pinero – Sophomore; 25 – Jack Gerstenmaier – Freshman; 37 – Thomas Woodruff – Senior	Outfielders: 23 – Christian Lowry – Freshman; 31 – Joe McCarthy – Junior

=== Coaching staff ===
Name	Position	Seasons at Virginia	Alma mater
Brian O'Connor	Head coach	12	Creighton University (1993)
Kevin McMullan	Associate head coach	12	Indiana University of Pennsylvania (1990)
Karl Kuhn	Assistant coach	12	University of Florida (1992)
Matt Kirby	Assistant coach	4	College of William & Mary (2003)

== Schedule ==
Legend
	Virginia win
	Virginia loss
	Postponement
**Bold**	Virginia team member

2015 Virginia Cavaliers baseball game log
Regular season
February

Date	Opponent	Rank	Site/stadium	Score	Win	Loss	Save	Attendance	Overall record	ACC Record
February 13	at East Carolina	#3	Clark–LeClair Stadium • Greenville, NC	3–1	**Kirby** (1–0)	Kruczynski (0–1)	**Sborz** (1)	2,541	1–0	
February 14	at East Carolina	#3	Clark–LeClair Stadium • Greenville, NC	9–2	**Jones** (1–0)	Wolfe (0–1)		3,058	2–0	
February 15	at East Carolina	#3	Clark–LeClair Stadium • Greenville, NC	4–2	**Roberts** (1–0)	Boyd (0–1)	**Sborz** (2)	3,058	3–0	
February 17	VCU	#3	Davenport Field • Charlottesville, VA	Canceled						
February 20	Marist	#3	Bishop England High School • Charleston, S.C.	9–1	**Kirby** (2–0)	Evan (0–1)		227	4–0	
February 21	La Salle	#3	Charleston Southern • Charleston, S.C.	8–3	**Jones** (2–0)	Andujar (0–1)	**Doherty** (1)	219	5–0	
February 21	Marist	#3	College of Charleston • Charleston, S.C.	7–2	**Bettinger** (1–0)	Vrana (0–1)	**Rosenberger** (1)	255	6–0	
February 22	Marist	#3	Joseph P. Riley Jr. Park • Charleston, S.C.	5–4^{18}	**Sousa** (1–0)	Bunting (0–1)		527	7–0	
February 24	George Washington	#2	Davenport Field • Charlottesville, VA	Canceled						
February 27	Hartford	#2	Myrtle Beach, S.C.	5–1	**Kirby** (3–0)	Gauthier (1–1)	**Bettinger** (1)	255	8–0	
February 28	Seton Hall	#2	Myrtle Beach, S.C.	4–1	**Jones** (3–0)	Pacillo (0–2)	**Sborz** (3)	271	9–0	

March

Date	Opponent	Rank	Site/stadium	Score	Win	Loss	Save	Attendance	Overall record	ACC Record
March 1	Cornell	#2	Myrtle Beach, S.C.	5–4	**Sborz** (1–0)	Horton (0–2)		177	10–0	
March 4	VMI	#2	Davenport Field • Charlottesville, VA	Postponed						
March 7	Pittsburgh	#2	Cary, N.C.	0–1	Zeuch (3–1)	**Kirby** (3–1)		317	10–1	0–1
March 7	Pittsburgh	#2	Cary, N.C.	2–1	**Jones** (4–0)	Sandefur (1–1)	**Sborz** (4)	317	11–1	1–1
March 8	Pittsburgh	#2	Cary, N.C.	10–3	**Waddell** (1–0)	Berube (0–2)		728	12–1	2–1
March 11	Old Dominion	#3	Davenport Field • Charlottesville, VA	5–14	Diaz (3–1)	**Casey** (0–1)		2,778	12–2	
March 13	at Virginia Tech	#3	English Field • Blacksburg, VA	1–2	Keselica (3–1)	**Roberts** (1–1)		419	12–3	2–2
March 14	at Virginia Tech	#3	English Field • Blacksburg, VA	1–3	McGarity (2–1)	**Jones** (4–1)	Scherzer (3)	1,282	12–4	2–3
March 15	at Virginia Tech	#3	English Field • Blacksburg, VA	5–6	Coward (1–0)	**Sborz** (1–1)	Naughton (1)	2,642	12–5	2–4
March 17	Towson	#12	Davenport Field • Charlottesville, VA	8–0	**Bettinger** (2–0)	Lawler (0–3)		2,901	13–5	
March 20	Florida State	#12	Davenport Field • Charlottesville, VA	8–4	**Doherty** (1–0)	Silva (2–1)	**Sborz** (5)	3,200	14–5	3–4
March 21	Florida State	#12	Davenport Field • Charlottesville, VA	10–12	Silva (3–1)	**Sborz** (1–2)		4,196	14–6	3–5
March 22	Florida State	#12	Davenport Field • Charlottesville, VA	1–13	Johnson (3–1)	**Waddell** (1–1)		3,994	14–7	3–6
March 24	Georgetown	#25	Davenport Field • Charlottesville, VA	0–1	Simon (2–2)	**Bettinger** (2–1)	Ellingson (3)	2,871	14–8	
March 25	at Liberty	#25	Liberty Baseball Stadium • Lynchburg, VA	10–7	**Casey** (1–1)	Stafford		2,841	15–8	
March 27	at Notre Dame	#25	Frank Eck Stadium • Notre Dame, IN	9–1	**Kirby** (4–1)	Kerrigan (1–4)	**Doherty** (2)	783	16–8	4–6
March 28	at Notre Dame	#25	Frank Eck Stadium • Notre Dame, IN	4–2	**Doyle** (1–0)	Guenther (1–1)	**Sborz** (6)	783	17–8	5–6
March 29	at Notre Dame	#25	Frank Eck Stadium • Notre Dame, IN	5–4	**Waddell** (2–1)	McCarty (3–3)	**Sborz** (7)	377	18–8	6–6
March 31	at VCU	#20	The Diamond • Richmond, VA	5–3	**Casey** (2–1)	Concepcion (1–2)	**Sborz** (8)	3,233	19–8	

April

Date	Opponent	Rank	Site/stadium	Score	Win	Loss	Save	Attendance	Overall record	ACC Record
April 1	VMI	#20	Davenport Field • Charlottesville, VA	6–7	Staats (1–1)	**Cummins** (0–1)	Edens (4)	3,014	19–9	
April 4	Louisville	#20	Davenport Field • Charlottesville, VA	1–8	Funkhouser (4–2)	**Kirby** (4–2)		4,372	19–10	6–7
April 5	Louisville	#20	Davenport Field • Charlottesville, VA	4–11	McKay (5–0)	**Doherty** (1–1)		3,739	19–11	6–8
April 6	Louisville		Davenport Field • Charlottesville, VA	0–4	Rogers (5–1)	**Waddell** (2–2)		3,278	19–12	6–9
April 8	James Madison		Davenport Field • Charlottesville, VA	14–1	**Casey** (3–1)	Tucker (1–3)		3,245	20–12	
April 10	at Georgia Tech		Russ Chandler Stadium • Atlanta, GA	14–4	**Kirby** (5–2)	King (2–2)		1,409	21–12	7–9
April 11	at Georgia Tech		Russ Chandler Stadium • Atlanta, GA	4–11	Gorst (3–2)	**Conor** (4–2)		2,344	21–13	7–10
April 12	at Georgia Tech		Russ Chandler Stadium • Atlanta, GA	3–4	Gold (5–1)	**Waddell** (2–3)	Ryan (7)	1,641	21–14	7–11
April 14	Radford		Davenport Field • Charlottesville, VA	Canceled						
April 15	William & Mary		Davenport Field • Charlottesville, VA	3–2	**Bettinger** (3–1)	Fletcher (3–1)	**Sborz** (9)	3,084	22–14	
April 17	Miami (FL)		Davenport Field • Charlottesville, VA	5–4	**Rosenberger** (1–0)	Woodrey (4–2)	**Sborz** (10)	3,589	23–14	8–11
April 18	Miami (FL)		Davenport Field • Charlottesville, VA	5–2	**Doherty** (2–1)	Garcia (4–2)	**Sborz** (11)	4,228	24–14	9–11
April 19	Miami (FL)		Davenport Field • Charlottesville, VA	6–8	Abrams (1–0)	**Waddell** (2–4)	Garcia (9)	3,747	24–15	9–12
April 21	Longwood		Davenport Field • Charlottesville, VA	14–4	**Casey** (4–1)	Catlin (3–2)	**Roberts** (1)		25–15	
April 22	Liberty		Davenport Field • Charlottesville, VA	5–2	**Haseley** (1–0)	Parker (3–4)	**Sborz** (12)	3,017	26–15	
April 24	at NC State		Doak Field • Raleigh, NC	8–3	**Jones** (5–2)	Brown (3–3)		1,759	27–15	10–12
April 25	at NC State		Doak Field • Raleigh, NC	3–4	Gilbert (1–1)	**Doyle** (1–1)		937	27–16	10–13
April 26	at NC State		Doak Field • Raleigh, NC	3–5^{10}	DeJuneas (2–2)	**Bettinger** (3–2)		1,113	27–17	10–14
April 28	at Old Dominion		Harbor Park • Norfolk, VA	1–3	Benitez (1–1)	**Haseley** (1–1)	Hartman (1)	6,029	27–18	

May

Date	Opponent	Rank	Site/stadium	Score	Win	Loss	Save	Attendance	Overall record	ACC Record
May 8	Duke		Davenport Field • Charlottesville, VA	3–1	**Doherty** (3–1)	Istler (5–4)	**Bettinger** (2)	3,723	28–18	11–14
May 9	Duke		Davenport Field • Charlottesville, VA	7–9	Labosky (2–0)	**Bettinger** (3–3)	Koplove (11)	4,393	28–19	11–15
May 10	Duke		Davenport Field • Charlottesville, VA	4–2	**Sborz** (2–2)	Clark (3–5)	**Haseley** (1)	4,118	29–19	12–15
May 12	Richmond		Davenport Field • Charlottesville, VA	8–6	**Bettinger** (4–3)	Lively		3,369	30–19	
May 14	at North Carolina		Boshamer Stadium • Chapel Hill, NC	2–1^{10}	**Haseley** (2–1)	Thornton (3–6)	**Bettinger** (3)	1,997	31–19	13–15
May 15	at North Carolina		Boshamer Stadium • Chapel Hill, NC	6–2	**Waddell** (3–4)	Bukauskas (4–3)		2,957	32–19	14–15
May 16	at North Carolina		Boshamer Stadium • Chapel Hill, NC	8–2	**Rosenberger** (2–0)	Kelley (5–3)	**Doherty** (3)	2,527	33–19	15–15

Post-season
ACC Tournament

Date	Opponent	Rank	Site/stadium	Score	Win	Loss	Save	Attendance	Overall record	ACCT Record
May 19	Georgia Tech	#29	Durham Bulls Athletic Park • Durham, NC	11–0^{7}	**Sborz** (3–2)	King (4–5)		2,614	34–19	1–0
May 20	Miami (FL)	#29	Durham Bulls Athletic Park • Durham, NC	5–9	Garcia (5–2)	**Bettinger** (4–4)		2,774	34–20	1–1
May 22	Notre Dame	#29	Durham Bulls Athletic Park • Durham, NC	2–8	Smoyer (9–0)	**Waddell** (3–5)	Bielak (1)	2,916	34–21	1–2
May 23	NC State	#29	Durham Bulls Athletic Park • Durham, NC	2–10	Williamson (4–3)	**Bettinger** (4–5)		7,139	34–22	1–3

NCAA tournament – Lake Elsinore (Calif.) Regional

Date	Opponent	Rank	Site/stadium	Score	Win	Loss	Save	Attendance	Overall record	NCAAT Record
May 29	(2) USC		Lake Elsinore Diamond • Lake Elsinore, CA	6–1	**Jones** (6–2)	Davis (3–3)	**Sborz** (13)	2,000	35–22	1–0
May 30	(4) San Diego State		Lake Elsinore Diamond • Lake Elsinore, CA	3–1	**Sborz** (4–2)	Seyler (9–3)		2,114	36–22	2–0
May 31	(2) USC		Lake Elsinore Diamond • Lake Elsinore, CA	14–10^{11}	**Rosenberger** (3–0)	Wheatley (4–4)	**Sborz** (14)	1,065	37–22	3–0

NCAA tournament – Charlottesville, VA Super Regional

Date	Opponent	Rank	Site/stadium	Score	Win	Loss	Save	Attendance	Overall record	NCAAT Record
June 5	Maryland	#13	Davenport Field • Charlottesville, VA	5–3	**Jones** (7–2)	Mooney (3–1)	**Sborz** (14)	5,001	38–22	4–0
June 6	Maryland	#13	Davenport Field • Charlottesville, VA	5–4	**Bettinger** (5–5)	Galligan (4–5)		5,001	39–22	5–0

NCAA tournament – College World Series

Date	Opponent	Rank	Site/stadium	Score	Win	Loss	Save	Attendance	Overall record	CWS Record
June 13	#7 Arkansas	#8	TD Ameritrade Park • Omaha, NE	5–3	**Sborz** (5–2)	Killian (3–5)		24,228	40–22	1–0
June 15	#2 Florida	#8	TD Ameritrade Park • Omaha, NE	1–0	**Waddell** (4–5)	Puk (9–4)	**Sborz** (15)	19,544	41–22	2–0
June 19	#2 Florida	#8	TD Ameritrade Park • Omaha, NE	5–10	Faedo (11–6)	**Kirby** (5–3)		19,015	41–23	2–1
June 20	#2 Florida	#8	TD Ameritrade Park • Omaha, NE	5–4	**Sborz** (6–2)	Lewis (6–2)		15,560	42–23	3–1
June 22	#5 Vanderbilt	#8	TD Ameritrade Park • Omaha, NE	1–5	Fulmer (14–2)	**Jones** (7–3)		21,652	42–24	3–2
June 23	#5 Vanderbilt	#8	TD Ameritrade Park • Omaha, NE	3–0	**Sborz** (7–2)	Pfeiffer (6–5)		24,645	43–24	4–2
June 24	#5 Vanderbilt	#8	TD Ameritrade Park • Omaha, NE	4–2	**Waddell** (5–5)	Kilichowski (3–4)	**Kirby** (1)	17,689	44–24	5–2

All rankings from Collegiate Baseball.

== Rankings ==
Ranking movements Legend: ██ Increase in ranking ██ Decrease in ranking — = Not ranked
	Week																		
Poll	Pre	1	2	3	4	5	6	7	8	9	10	11	12	13	14	15	16	17	Final
Coaches'	2	2*	1	1	1	7	14	12	17	23	20	23	24	—	25	—	—*	1	1
Baseball America	4	4	4	3	3	14	20	16	22	—	—	—	—	—	—	—			1
Collegiate Baseball^	3	3	2	2	3	12	25	20	—	—	—	—	—	—	29	—	13	8	1
NCBWA†	2	1	1	1	1	9	12	9	15	21	19	22	27	27	24	30	14		1

^ Collegiate Baseball ranked 40 teams in their preseason poll, but only ranked 30 teams weekly during the season.
† NCBWA ranks 30 teams in their preseason poll, but only ranks 25 teams weekly during the season.
* A new poll was not released for this week, so for comparison purposes, the previous week's ranking is inserted in this week's slot.

== Awards and honors ==
Nathan Kirby

- Louisville Slugger Pre-season First Team All-American
- Perfect Game USA Pre-season First Team All-American
- Baseball America Pre-season First team All-American
- All ACC 1st Team

Joe McCarthy

- Louisville Slugger Pre-season Second Team All-American
- Perfect Game USA Pre-season Second Team All-American
- Baseball America Pre-season Second Team All-American

Josh Sborz

- Most Outstanding Player, 2015 College World Series
- ACC Second Team

Brandon Waddell

- Louisville Slugger Pre-season Second Team All-American
- Perfect Game USA Pre-season Third Team All-American

Matt Thaiss

- Louisville Slugger 2015 Third Team All-American

Pavin Smith

- ACC All Freshman Team
- Louisville Slugger Freshmen A-A Team

Adam Haseley

- ACC All Freshman Team
- Louisville Slugger Freshmen A-A Team

Kenny Towns

- ACC Second Team

Daniel Pinero

- ACC Second Team
