= 2015 NCAA Division I baseball tournament =

American college sports championship

- Season: 2015
- Teams: 64
- Finals site: TD Ameritrade Park; Omaha, Nebraska
- Champions: Virginia Cavaliers (1st title)
- Runner-up: Vanderbilt Commodores (3rd CWS Appearance)
- Winning coach: Brian O'Connor (1st title)
- MOP: Josh Sborz (Virginia)
- Television: ESPN Networks

The 2015 NCAA Division I baseball tournament began on Friday, May 29, 2015, as part of the 2015 NCAA Division I baseball season. The 64-team double-elimination tournament concluded with the 2015 College World Series in Omaha, Nebraska, which began on June 13 and ended on June 24 with the Virginia Cavaliers upsetting the defending champion Vanderbilt Commodores 4–2 in the decisive Game 3 and thereby avenging their CWS Finals loss to Vanderbilt the previous year.

The 64 participating NCAA Division I college baseball teams were selected out of an eligible 298 teams. Thirty-one teams were awarded an automatic bid as champions of their conferences, and 33 teams were selected at-large by the NCAA Division I Baseball Committee.

Teams were divided into 16 regionals of four teams, which conducted a double-elimination tournament. Regional champions then faced each other in Super Regionals, a best-of-three series to determine the eight participants of the College World Series.

Vanderbilt University and the University of Virginia split the first two games of the best-of-three championship series before Virginia won Game 3, 4–2, to win their first national championship in baseball. The two teams previously met in the championship series in 2014, which Vanderbilt won.

== Bids ==
=== Automatic bids ===
School	Conference	Record (Conf)	Berth	Last NCAA appearance
Stony Brook	America East	34–14 (18–4)	Tournament	2012 (Coral Gables Regional)
East Carolina	American	40–20 (15–9)	Tournament	2012 (Chapel Hill Regional)
Florida State	ACC	41–19 (17–13)	Tournament	2014 (Tallahassee Regional)
Lipscomb	Atlantic Sun	39–18 (13–8)	Tournament	2008 (Athens Regional)
VCU	Atlantic 10	37–22 (14–10)	Tournament	2010 (Charlottesville Regional)
Texas	Big 12	29–25 (11–13)	Tournament	2014 (Houston Regional)
St. John's	Big East	39–14 (14–3)	Tournament	2012 (Chapel Hill Regional)
Radford	Big South	43–14 (20–4)	Tournament	First appearance
Michigan	Big Ten	37–23 (14–10)	Tournament	2008 (Ann Arbor Regional)
Cal State Fullerton	Big West	34–22 (19–5)	Regular season	2014 (Stillwater Regional)
UNC Wilmington	Colonial	39–16 (18–6)	Tournament	2013 (Charlottesville Regional)
FIU	Conference USA	28–29 (13–17)	Tournament	2011 (Chapel Hill Regional)
Wright State	Horizon	41–15 (21–8)	Tournament	2011 (College Station Regional)
Columbia	Ivy League	29–15 (16–4)	Championship series	2014 (Coral Gables Regional)
Canisius	Metro Atlantic	34–28 (16–8)	Tournament	2013 (Chapel Hill Regional)
Ohio	Mid-American	36–19 (17–10)	Tournament	1997 (Midwest Regional)
Florida A&M	Mid-Eastern	23–23 (15–9)	Tournament	First appearance
Missouri State	Missouri Valley	45–10 (18–3)	Tournament	2012 (Coral Gables Regional)
San Diego State	Mountain West	40–21 (19–10)	Tournament	2014 (Lafayette Regional)
Sacred Heart	Northeast	23–30 (13–11)	Tournament	2012 (Raleigh Regional)
Morehead State	Ohio Valley	37–20 (20–10)	Tournament	1983 (Ann Arbor Regional)
UCLA	Pac-12	42–14 (22–8)	Regular season	2013 (Los Angeles Regional)
Lehigh	Patriot	25–27 (12–8)	Tournament	2006 (Charlottesville Regional)
Florida	Southeastern	44–16 (19–11)	Tournament	2014 (Gainesville Regional)
Mercer	Southern	35–21 (16–7)	Tournament	2013 (Starkville Regional)
Houston Baptist	Southland	28–25 (14–13)	Tournament	First appearance
Texas Southern	Southwestern Athletic	31–17 (16–7)	Tournament	2008 (Baton Rouge Regional)
Oral Roberts	Summit	41–14 (25–5)	Tournament	2012 (Waco Regional)
Louisiana–Lafayette	Sun Belt	39–21 (18–11)	Tournament	2014 (Lafayette Regional)
Pepperdine	West Coast	30–27 (17–10)	Tournament	2014 (San Luis Obispo Regional)
Cal State Bakersfield	Western Athletic	36–22 (17–9)	Tournament	First appearance

=== By conference ===
Conference	Total	Schools
SEC	7	Arkansas, Auburn, Florida, LSU, Ole Miss, Texas A&M, Vanderbilt
ACC	7	Clemson, Florida State, Louisville, Miami (FL), NC State, Notre Dame, Virginia
Pac-12	6	Arizona State, California, Oregon, Oregon State, UCLA, USC
Big Ten	5	Illinois, Indiana, Iowa, Maryland, Michigan
American	4	East Carolina, Houston, South Florida, Tulane
Big 12	3	Oklahoma State, TCU, Texas
Conference USA	3	Florida Atlantic, FIU, Rice
Missouri Valley	3	Bradley, Dallas Baptist, Missouri State
Big West	2	Cal State Fullerton, UC Santa Barbara
Big South	2	Coastal Carolina, Radford
Colonial	2	College of Charleston, UNC Wilmington
America East	1	Stony Brook
Atlantic 10	1	VCU
Atlantic Sun	1	Lipscomb
Big East	1	St. John's
Horizon	1	Wright State
Ivy	1	Columbia
MAAC	1	Canisius
Mid-American	1	Ohio
MEAC	1	Florida A&M
Mountain West	1	San Diego State
NEC	1	Sacred Heart
Ohio Valley	1	Morehead State
Patriot	1	Lehigh
Southern	1	Mercer
SWAC	1	Texas Southern
Southland	1	Houston Baptist
Summit	1	Oral Roberts
Sun Belt	1	Louisiana–Lafayette
WAC	1	Cal State Bakersfield
West Coast	1	Pepperdine

== National seeds ==
With the exception of Missouri State, these teams would automatically host a super regional if they advanced that far. Missouri State was not able to host because of a venue scheduling conflict.

1. UCLA †
2. **LSU**
3. Louisville ‡
4. **Florida**
5. **Miami (FL)**
6. Illinois ‡
7. **TCU**
8. Missouri State ‡

Bold indicates College World Series participant
† indicates teams that were eliminated in the Regional Tournament
‡ indicates teams that were eliminated in the Super Regional Tournament

== Regionals and Super Regionals ==
Bold indicates winner. Seeds for regional tournaments indicate seeds within regional. Seeds for super regional tournaments indicate national seeds only.

=== Charlottesville Super Regional ===
Hosted by Virginia at Davenport Field

Regional	Regional
1	**UCLA**	**7**
4	Cal State Bakersfield	2
1	UCLA	1
3	**Maryland**	**4**
3	**Maryland**	**3**
2	Ole Miss	1
Los Angeles Regional – Jackie Robinson Stadium
4	**Cal State Bakersfield**	**2**
2	Ole Miss	1
4	Cal State Bakersfield	1
1	**UCLA**	**9**
1	UC Santa Barbara	3
4	**San Diego State**	**4**
4	San Diego State	1
3	**Virginia**	**3**
3	**Virginia**	**6**
2	USC	1
†Lake Elsinore Regional – Lake Elsinore Diamond
1	UC Santa Barbara	3
2	**USC**	**12**
2	**USC**	**12**
4	San Diego State	11

Regional Final
3	**Maryland**	2	**2**
1	UCLA	**4**	1
3	**Virginia**	**14**	–
2	USC	10^{11}	–

Super Regional
Maryland	3	4	–
**Virginia**	**5**	**5**	–

†UC Santa Barbara was unable to host at their home stadium, Caesar Uyesaka Stadium, due to inadequate facilities according to NCAA regional hosting guidelines.

=== Fayetteville Super Regional ===
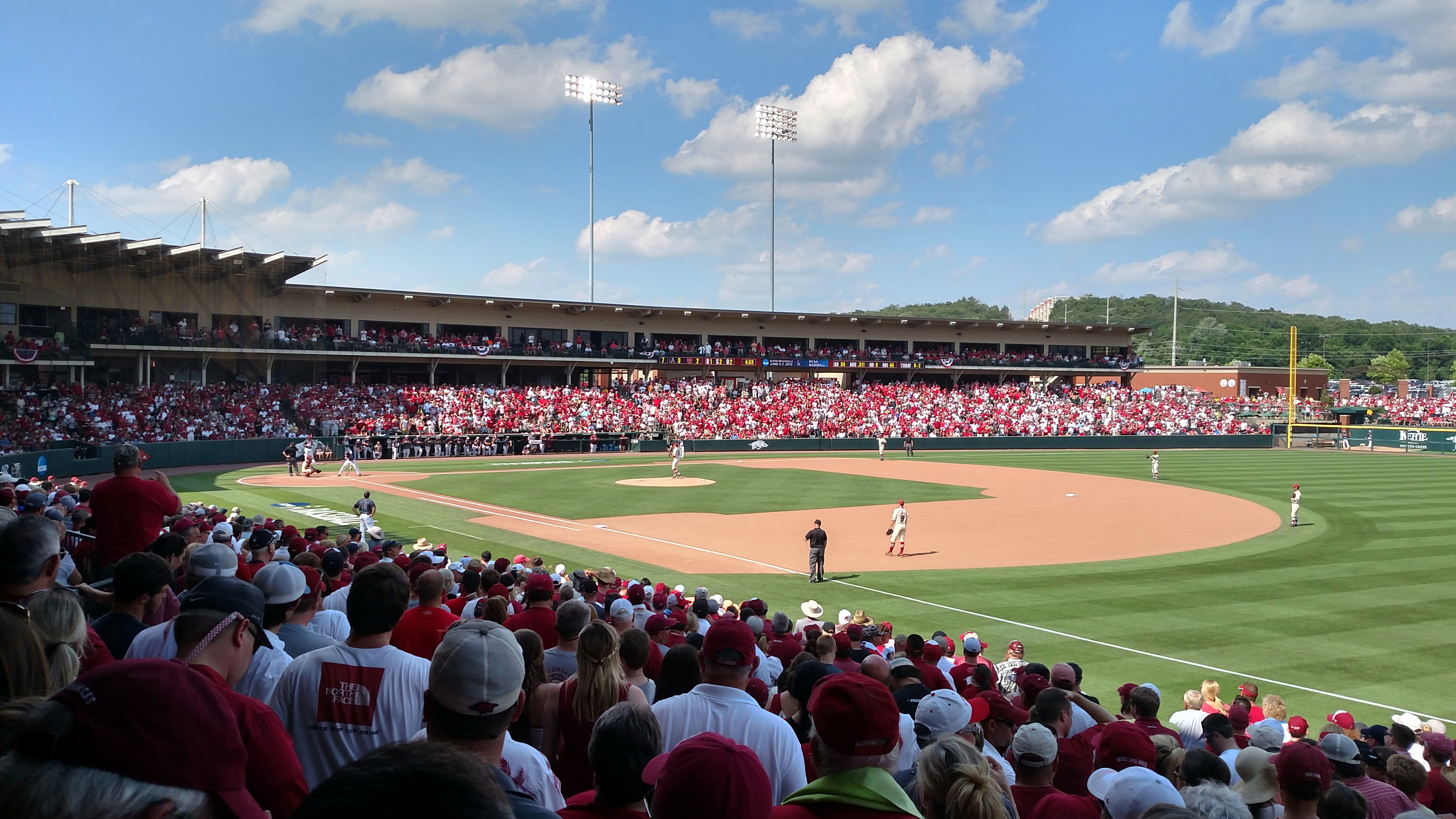
Action from Game 3 of Fayetteville Super Regional

Hosted by Arkansas at Baum Stadium, due to a scheduling conflict with the Springfield Cardinals, who also play at Missouri State's Hammons Field.

Regional	Regional
1	**Missouri State**	**14**
4	Canisius	1
1	**Missouri State**	**5**
2	Iowa	3
3	Oregon	1
2	**Iowa**	**3**
Springfield Regional – Hammons Field
4	Canisius	6
3	**Oregon**	**12**
3	Oregon	1
2	**Iowa**	**2**^{11}
1	**Oklahoma State**	**5**
4	St. John's	4
1	Oklahoma State	5
2	**Arkansas**	**7**
3	Oral Roberts	6
2	**Arkansas**	**8**
Stillwater Regional – Allie P. Reynolds Stadium
4	**St. John's**	**10**
3	Oral Roberts	4
4	**St. John's**	**2**
1	Oklahoma State	1

Regional Final
1	**Missouri State**	**3**	–
2	Iowa	2	–
2	**Arkansas**	**4**	–
4	St. John's	3	–

Super Regional
8	Missouri State	4	**3**	2
**Arkansas**	**18**	1	**3**

=== Gainesville Super Regional ===
Regional	Regional
1	**Florida**	**19**
4	Florida A&M	0
1	**Florida**	**8**
3	South Florida	2
3	**South Florida**	**5**
2	Florida Atlantic	3
Gainesville Regional – Alfred A. McKethan Stadium
4	Florida A&M	1
2	**Florida Atlantic**	**8**
2	**Florida Atlantic**	**8**
3	South Florida	4
1	**Florida State**	**5**
4	Mercer	4^{10}
1	**Florida State**	**3**
2	College of Charleston	2
3	Auburn	6
2	**College of Charleston**	**7**^{11}
Tallahassee Regional – Mike Martin Field at Dick Howser Stadium
4	Mercer	0
3	**Auburn**	**1**
3	Auburn	2
2	**College of Charleston**	**3**

Regional Final
1	**Florida**	**2**	–
2	Florida Atlantic	1	–
1	**Florida State**	**3**	–
2	College of Charleston	1	–

Super Regional
4	**Florida**	**13**	**11**	–
Florida State	5	4	–

=== Coral Gables Super Regional ===
Regional	Regional
1	**Miami (FL)**	**6**
4	FIU	2
1	**Miami (FL)**	**8**
3	Columbia	3
3	**Columbia**	**6**
2	East Carolina	3
Coral Gables Regional – Alex Rodriguez Park at Mark Light Field
4	**FIU**	**2**
2	East Carolina	0
4	FIU	3
3	**Columbia**	**4**
1	Dallas Baptist	2
4	**VCU**	**7**
4	**VCU**	**5**
2	Oregon State	1
3	Texas	4
2	**Oregon State**	**5**
Dallas Regional – Horner Ballpark
1	**Dallas Baptist**	**8**
3	Texas	1
1	**Dallas Baptist**	**7**
2	Oregon State	1

Regional Final
1	**Miami (FL)**	0	**21**
3	Columbia	**3**	3
4	**VCU**	1	**3**
1	Dallas Baptist	**2**	1

Super Regional
5	**Miami (FL)**	**3**	**10**	–
VCU	2	3	–

=== Baton Rouge Super Regional ===
Regional	Regional
1	**LSU**	**10**
4	Lehigh	3
1	**LSU**	**2**
2	UNC Wilmington	0
3	Tulane	1
2	**UNC Wilmington**	**10**
Baton Rouge Regional – Alex Box Stadium/Skip Bertman Field
4	Lehigh	3
3	**Tulane**	**15**
3	Tulane	2
2	**UNC Wilmington**	**8**
1	**Houston**	**6**
4	Houston Baptist	4
1	Houston	1
3	**Louisiana–Lafayette**	**2**
3	**Louisiana–Lafayette**	**7**
2	Rice	6
Houston Regional – Cougar Field
4	Houston Baptist	1
2	**Rice**	**3**
2	**Rice**	**3**
1	Houston	2^{20}

Regional Final
1	**LSU**	**2**	–
2	UNC Wilmington	0	–
3	**Louisiana–Lafayette**	**5**	–
2	Rice	2	–

Super Regional
2	**LSU**	**4**	**6**	–
Louisiana–Lafayette	3	3	–

=== Fort Worth Super Regional ===
Regional	Regional
1	**TCU**	**10**
4	Sacred Heart	0
1	TCU	4
2	**NC State**	**5**
3	Stony Brook	0
2	**NC State**	**3**
Fort Worth Regional – Lupton Stadium
4	Sacred Heart	6
3	**Stony Brook**	**11**
3	Stony Brook	3
1	**TCU**	**8**
1	**Texas A&M**	**5**
4	Texas Southern	0
1	Texas A&M	1
3	**California**	**2**^{14}
3	**California**	**9**
2	Coastal Carolina	3
College Station Regional – Olsen Field at Blue Bell Park
4	Texas Southern	1
2	**Coastal Carolina**	**4**
2	Coastal Carolina	1
1	**Texas A&M**	**8**

Regional Final
2	NC State	2	8
1	**TCU**	**8**	**9**^{10}
3	California	3	1
1	**Texas A&M**	**4**^{12}	**3**

Super Regional
7	**TCU**	**13**	1	**5**
Texas A&M	4	**2**^{10}	4^{16}

=== Louisville Super Regional ===
Regional	Regional
1	**Louisville**	**7**
4	Morehead State	2
1	**Louisville**	**4**
3	Michigan	3
3	**Michigan**	**10**
2	Bradley	5
Louisville Regional – Jim Patterson Stadium
4	Morehead State	4
2	**Bradley**	**9**
2	Bradley	3
3	**Michigan**	**4**
1	**Cal State Fullerton**	**9**
4	Pepperdine	3
1	**Cal State Fullerton**	**3**
2	Arizona State	2^{14}
3	Clemson	4
2	**Arizona State**	**7**
Fullerton Regional – Goodwin Field
4	**Pepperdine**	**10**
3	Clemson	8
4	**Pepperdine**	**7**
2	Arizona State	4

Regional Final
1	**Louisville**	**13**	–
3	Michigan	4	–
1	**Cal State Fullerton**	**10**	–
4	Pepperdine	1	–

Super Regional
3	Louisville	2	**9**	3
**Cal State Fullerton**	**3**^{10}	3	**4**^{11}

=== Champaign Super Regional ===
Regional	Regional
1	**Illinois**	**10**
4	Ohio	3
1	**Illinois**	**3**
2	Notre Dame	0
3	Wright State	7
2	**Notre Dame**	**13**
Champaign Regional – Illinois Field
4	Ohio	3
3	**Wright State**	**8**
3	**Wright State**	**4**
2	Notre Dame	0
1	**Vanderbilt**	**9**
4	Lipscomb	1
1	**Vanderbilt**	**6**
3	Indiana	4
3	**Indiana**	**7**
2	Radford	1
Nashville Regional – Hawkins Field
4	Lipscomb	2
2	**Radford**	**5**
2	**Radford**	**5**
3	Indiana	3

Regional Final
1	**Illinois**	**8**	–
3	Wright State	4	–
1	**Vanderbilt**	**21**	–
2	Radford	0	–

Super Regional
6	Illinois	0	2	–
**Vanderbilt**	**13**	**4**	–

== College World Series ==
The College World Series was held at TD Ameritrade Park in Omaha, Nebraska.

=== Participants ===
School	Conference	Record (conference)	Head coach	Previous CWS Appearances	Best CWS Finish	CWS record Not including this year
Arkansas	SEC	40–23 (17–12)	Dave Van Horn	7 (last: 2012)	2nd (1979)	11–14
Cal State Fullerton	Big West	39–23 (19–5)	Rick Vanderhook	16 (last: 2009)	1st (1979, 1984, 1995, 2004)	34–27
Florida	SEC	49–16 (19–11)	Kevin O'Sullivan	8 (last: 2012)	2nd (2005, 2011)	11–17
LSU	SEC	53–10 (21–8)	Paul Mainieri	16 (last: 2013)	1st (1991, 1993, 1996, 1997, 2000, 2009)	35–22
Miami (FL)	ACC	49–15 (22–8)	Jim Morris	23 (last: 2008)	1st (1982, 1985, 1999, 2001)	47–38
TCU	Big 12	49–13 (18–5)	Jim Schlossnagle	2 (last: 2014)	3rd (2010)	4–4
Vanderbilt	SEC	47–19 (20–10)	Tim Corbin	2 (last: 2014)	1st (2014)	7–4
Virginia	ACC	39–22 (15–15)	Brian O'Connor	3 (last: 2014)	2nd (2014)	7–6

=== Bracket ===
Seeds listed below indicate national seeds only

First round
**Virginia**	**5**
Arkansas	3
5	Miami (FL)	3
4	**Florida**	**15**
Arkansas	3
5	**Miami (FL)**	**4**
2	LSU	3
7	**TCU**	**10**
Cal State Fullerton	3
**Vanderbilt**	**4**
2	**LSU**	**5**
Cal State Fullerton	3

Second round
**Virginia**	**1**
4	Florida	0
5	Miami (FL)	2
4	**Florida**	**10**
7	TCU	0
**Vanderbilt**	**1**
2	LSU	4
7	**TCU**	**8**

Semifinals
**Virginia**	5	**5**
4	Florida	**10**	4
**Vanderbilt**	**7**	–
7	TCU	1	–

Championship series
**Virginia**	1	**3**	**4**
Vanderbilt	**5**	0	2

=== Game results ===
Date	Game	Winner	Score	Loser	Winning pitcher	Losing pitcher	Saving pitcher	Notes
June 13	Game 1	Virginia	5–3	Arkansas	Josh Sborz (5–2)	Trey Killian (3–5)	—	
June 13	Game 2	Florida	15–3	Miami (FL)	Logan Shore (10–6)	Andrew Suarez (9–2)	—	
June 14	Game 3	TCU	10–3	LSU	Preston Morrison (12–3)	Jared Poché (9–2)	—	
June 14/15^{[a]}	Game 4	Vanderbilt	4–3	Cal State Fullerton	Kyle Wright (6–1)	Tyler Peitzmeier (5–4)	—	
June 15	Game 5	Miami (FL)	4–3	Arkansas	Bryan Garcia (6–2)	Zach Jackson (5–1)	—	Arkansas eliminated
June 15	Game 6	Virginia	1–0	Florida	Brandon Waddell (4–5)	A. J. Puk (9–4)	Josh Sborz (15)	
June 16	Game 7	LSU	5–3	Cal State Fullerton	Alex Lange (12–0)	Connor Seabold (5–4)	—	Cal State Fullerton eliminated
June 16	Game 8	Vanderbilt	1–0	TCU	Philip Pfeifer (6–4)	Alex Young (9–3)	Kyle Wright (4)	
June 17	Game 9	Florida	10–2	Miami (FL)	Alex Faedo (6–2)	Enrique Sosa (7–5)	—	Miami (FL) eliminated
June 18	Game 10	TCU	8–4	LSU	Trey Teakell (3–1)	Austin Bain (2–3)	—	LSU eliminated
June 19	Game 11	Florida	10–5	Virginia	Logan Shore (11–6)	Nathan Kirby (5–3)	—	
June 19	Game 12	Vanderbilt	7–1	TCU	Walker Buehler (5–2)	Tyler Alexander (6–3)	—	TCU eliminated
June 20	Game 13	Virginia	5–4	Florida	Josh Sborz (6–2)	Taylor Lewis (6–2)	—	Florida eliminated
June 22	Final Game 1	Vanderbilt	5–1	Virginia	Carson Fulmer (14–2)	Connor Jones (7–3)	—	
June 23	Final Game 2	Virginia	3–0	Vanderbilt	Josh Sborz (7–2)	Philip Pfeifer (6–5)	—	
June 24	Final Game 3	Virginia	4–2	Vanderbilt	Brandon Waddell (5–5)	John Kilichowski (5–3)	Nathan Kirby (1)	Virginia wins College World Series

^{^[a]}Game began Sunday night at 7 p.m. CT. A rain delay occurred at 9:22 p.m. The game was suspended at 10:41 p.m. and resumed Monday at 2 p.m.

=== All-Tournament Team ===
The following players were members of the College World Series All-Tournament Team.

Position	Player	School
P	**Josh Sborz (MOP)**	Virginia
P	Brandon Waddell	Virginia
C	Kade Scivicque	LSU
1B	Zander Wiel	Vanderbilt
2B	Ernie Clement	Virginia
3B	Kenny Towns	Virginia
SS	Daniel Pinero	Virginia
OF	Bryan Reynolds	Vanderbilt
OF	Harrison Bader	Florida
OF	Jacob Heyward	Miami (FL)
DH	Connor Wanhanen	TCU

== Final standings ==
Seeds listed below indicate national seeds only

Place	School	Record
1st	Virginia	10–2
2nd	Vanderbilt	9–2
3rd	#4 Florida	8–2
3rd	#7 TCU	8–4
5th	#2 LSU	6–2
5th	#5 Miami (FL)	6–3
7th	Arkansas	5–3
7th	Cal State Fullerton	5–3
9th	Florida State	3–2
9th	#6 Illinois	3–2
9th	Louisiana–Lafayette	3–2
9th	#3 Louisville	4–2
9th	Maryland	3–3
9th	#8 Missouri State	4–2
9th	Texas A&M	5–3
9th	VCU	3–3
17th	California	2–2
17th	College of Charleston	2–2
17th	Columbia	3–2
17th	Dallas Baptist	3–2
17th	Florida Atlantic	2–2
17th	Iowa	2–2
17th	Michigan	2–2
17th	NC State	2–2
17th	Pepperdine	2–2
17th	Radford	2–2
17th	Rice	2–2
17th	St. John's	2–2
17th	#1 UCLA	3–2
17th	UNC Wilmington	2–2
17th	USC	2–2
17th	Wright State	2–2
33rd	Arizona State	1–2
33rd	Auburn	1–2
33rd	Bradley	1–2
33rd	Cal State Bakersfield	1–2
33rd	Coastal Carolina	1–2
33rd	Florida International	1–2
33rd	Houston	1–2
33rd	Indiana	1–2
33rd	Notre Dame	1–2
33rd	Oklahoma State	1–2
33rd	Oregon	1–2
33rd	Oregon State	1–2
33rd	San Diego State	1–2
33rd	South Florida	1–2
33rd	Stony Brook	1–2
33rd	Tulane	1–2
49th	Canisius	0–2
49th	Clemson	0–2
49th	East Carolina	0–2
49th	Florida A&M	0–2
49th	Houston Baptist	0–2
49th	Lehigh	0–2
49th	Lipscomb	0–2
49th	Mercer	0–2
49th	Morehead State	0–2
49th	Ohio	0–2
49th	Ole Miss	0–2
49th	Oral Roberts	0–2
49th	Sacred Heart	0–2
49th	Texas	0–2
49th	Texas Southern	0–2
49th	UC Santa Barbara	0–2

== Record by conference ==
Conference	# of Bids	Record	Win %	Nc Record	Nc Win %	RF	SR	WS	NS	CS	NC
Atlantic Coast	7	26–15	.634	26–15	.634	5	4	2	1	1	1
Southeastern	7	34–16	.680	34–16	.680	5	5	4	2	1	–
Big 12	3	9–8	.529	9–8	.529	1	1	1	1	–	–
Big West	2	5–5	.500	5–5	.500	1	1	1	–	–	–
Big Ten	5	11–11	.500	11–11	.500	4	2	–	–	–	–
Missouri Valley	3	8–6	.571	8–6	.571	2	1	–	–	–	–
Sun Belt	1	3–2	.600	3–2	.600	1	1	–	–	–	–
A 10	1	3–3	.500	3–3	.500	1	1	–	–	–	–
Pac-12	6	10–12	.455	10–12	.455	3	–	–	–	–	–
Conference USA	3	5–6	.455	5–6	.455	2	–	–	–	–	–
Colonial	2	4–4	.500	4–4	.500	2	–	–	–	–	–
Big South	2	3–4	.429	3–4	.429	1	–	–	–	–	–
American	4	3–8	.273	3–8	.273	–	–	–	–	–	–
Other	18	12–36	.250	12–36	.250	4	–	–	–	–	–

The columns RF, SR, WS, NS, CS, and NC respectively stand for the Regional Finals, Super Regionals, College World Series, National Semifinals, Championship Series, and National Champion. Nc is non-conference, that is, without games played against teams within the same conference; there may be no difference from overall.

== Media coverage ==
=== Radio ===
NRG Media provided nationwide radio coverage of the College World Series through its Omaha station KOZN, in association with Westwood One. It was streamed at westwoodonesports.com and on TuneIn. Kevin Kugler and John Bishop called all games leading up to the Championship Series with Gary Sharp acting as the field reporter. The Championship Series was called by Kugler and Scott Graham with Sharp acting as the field reporter.

=== Television ===
ESPN carried every game from the Regionals, Super Regionals, and College World Series across the ESPN Networks (ESPN, ESPN2, ESPNU, SEC Network, LHN, and ESPN3). ESPN also provided "Bases Loaded" coverage for the Regionals. Bases Loaded was hosted by Brendan Fitzgerald and Matt Schick with Kyle Peterson and Ben McDonald providing analysis. "Bases Loaded" aired Friday-Sunday from 1 p.m.–midnight EDT and Monday from 6 p.m.–midnight EDT on ESPN3. ESPN2 and ESPNU aired "Bases Loaded" in between games and throughout other select times during the tournament.

==== Broadcast assignments ====
Regionals

- Clay Matvick and Mike Rooney: Los Angeles, California
- Mike Keith and Rusty Ensor: Baton Rouge, Louisiana
- Doug Bell and Wes Clements: Louisville, Kentucky
- Mike Morgan and Dave Perno: Gainesville, Florida
- Jason Benetti and Nick Belmonte: Coral Gables, Florida
- Jim Barbar and Jerry Kindall: Champaign, Illinois
- Brett Dolan and Greg Swindell: Fort Worth, Texas
- Anish Shroff and Landon Powell: Springfield, Missouri

Super Regionals

- Mike Patrick and Eduardo Perez: Charlottesville, Virginia
- Kevin Dunn and Keith Moreland: Fayetteville, Arkansas
- Anish Shroff and Danny Kanell: Coral Gables, Florida
- Tom Hart and Gabe Gross: Gainesville, Florida

College World Series

- Jon Sciambi, Aaron Boone, and Kaylee Hartung: Afternoons
- Karl Ravech, Kyle Peterson, and Jessica Mendoza: Evenings

Regionals

- Tom Hart and Gabe Gross: College Station, Texas
- Kevin Dunn and Keith Moreland: Dallas, Texas
- Dave Neal and Chris Burke: Nashville, Tennessee
- Doug Sherman and John Gregory: Houston, Texas
- Mike Couzens and Eduardo Perez: Tallahassee, Florida
- Trey Bender and Jay Walker: Lake Elsinore, California
- Mark Neely and Jay Powell: Stillwater, Oklahoma
- Roxy Bernstein and Randy Flores: Fullerton, California

Super Regionals

- Adam Amin, Ben McDonald, and Kaylee Hartung: Baton Rouge, Louisiana
- Dave Neal, Kyle Peterson, and Chris Burke: Fort Worth, Texas
- Clay Matvick and Jay Walker: Champaign, Illinois
- Roxy Bernstein and Randy Flores: Louisville, Kentucky

College World Series Championship Series

- Karl Ravech, Kyle Peterson, Aaron Boone, Jessica Mendoza, and Kaylee Hartung
