= Rhett Wiseman =

American baseball player (born 1994)

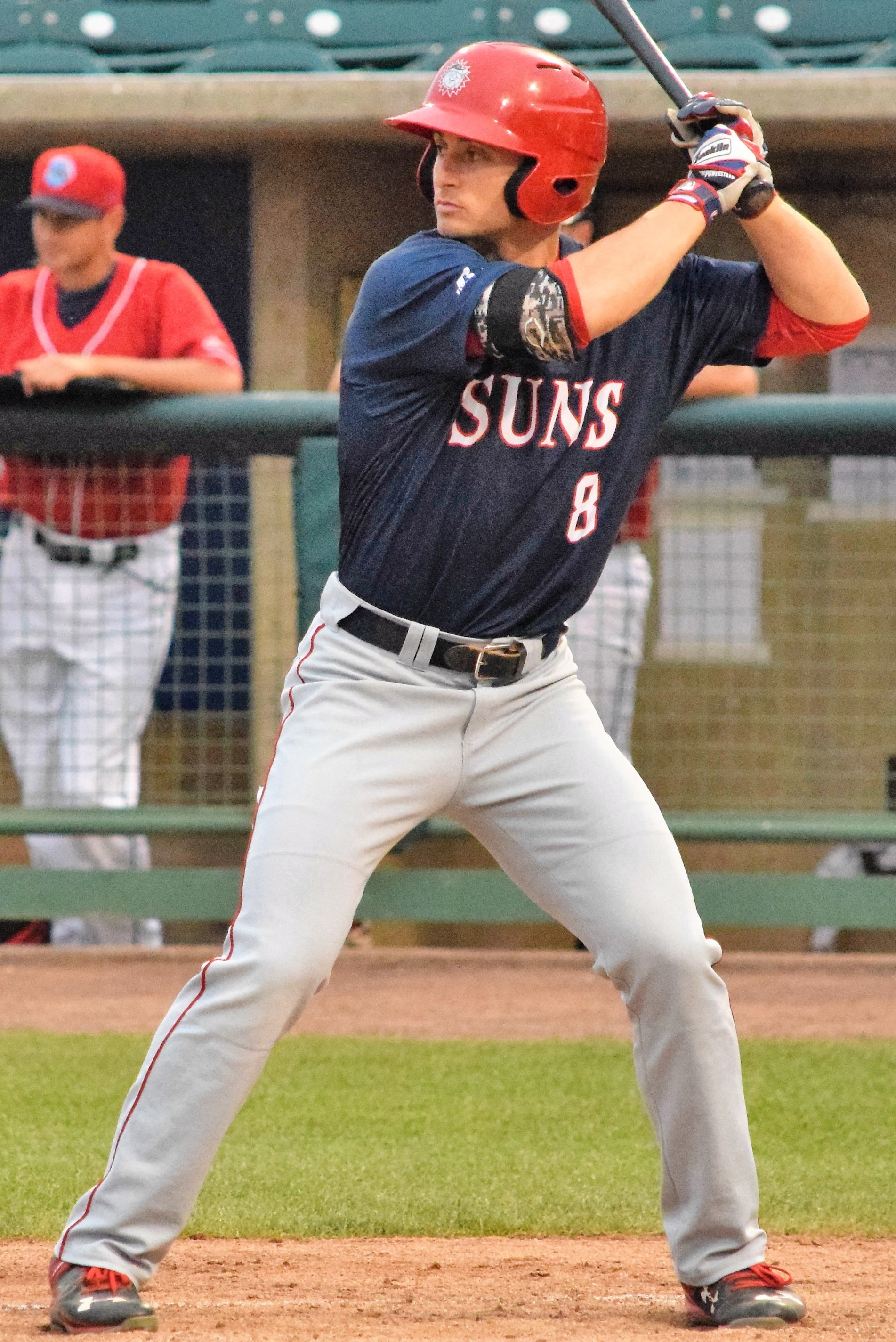
- Wiseman with the Hagerstown Suns in 2016
- Outfielder
- Born: June 22, 1994 (age 31); Boston, Massachusetts, U.S.
- Bats: Left Throws: Right
- Stats at Baseball Reference

Rhett Harrison Wiseman (born June 22, 1994), nicknamed "Wise", is an American former professional baseball outfielder.

In high school, Wiseman was the 2012 Massachusetts Gatorade Player of the Year. He played college baseball for three years for the Vanderbilt Commodores, winning the 2014 College World Series his junior year. He was drafted in the third round of the 2015 Major League Baseball draft by the Washington Nationals. Wiseman started for Israel at the 2017 World Baseball Classic qualifier, helping the team advance to the tournament proper. In 2018, he was named a post-season Carolina League All Star, and led all Nationals' minor leaguers in home runs, with 21.

== Early and personal life ==
Wiseman was born in Boston, Massachusetts, to Michael and Stephanie Wiseman, and is Jewish. His mother owns a dance studio and is a professional choreographer, and his father is a biohazardous engineer who owns a company that cleans up crime scenes. His father played college baseball as an outfielder for Brandeis University, for which he is second all-time in stolen base percentage (.915), third all-time in stolen bases (54) and hits (194), and sixth all-time in total bases (267). Wiseman has a sister, Cierra. He is close friends with fellow baseball player Tyler Beede.

== High school ==
Wiseman attended Buckingham Browne & Nichols high school in Cambridge, Massachusetts, where he played baseball as a left-handed hitting center fielder. He was also president of his high school class, and earned letters for three years in football, as a defensive back and wide receiver.

In high school, Wiseman was a four-time Independent School League (ISL) First Team, 2010 Louisville Slugger All American, 2011 Perfect Game All American, 2012 ISL MVP, 2012 Massachusetts Gatorade Player of the Year (after batting .444), Rawlings preseason First Team All American, Louisville Slugger All American, and Perfect Game All American. He set his high school's career records in stolen bases (74), home runs (31), and triples (24). He was named the top prospect in the Futures Collegiate Baseball League in 2012, while playing for the Brockton Rox, even though he was the only high school player on a roster of college-age players.

He was known for his "explosive" speed, and drew up to 75 scouts in one game. Wiseman was timed at 6.59 seconds in the 60-yard dash, which the Boston Globe opined put him in the "elite runner" category. The head coach of Groton School said he was "very disciplined at the plate, with a short, compact, powerful swing ... [and] Defensively, he has great ability in center field and an above-average arm... a five-tool player.”

In 2012, Wiseman was ranked # 42 of players in the major league baseball draft by ESPNHS, and # 47 by MLB Draft Guide. However, after he indicated he was unlikely to sign unless he was drafted as one of the first 40 picks, and signed a letter of intent to Vanderbilt University, he was drafted in the 25th round by the Chicago Cubs in the 2012 Major League Baseball draft.

== College ==
Wiseman attended Vanderbilt University, where he played baseball and earned a business degree. He played outfield for the Vanderbilt Commodores. Remarking on the change from growing up in Massachusetts, he said: "So, you go from a place where everyone knows Jewish people ... And you go down South and it’s Christianity, and it’s Baptist. The first couple of weeks I’m there a kid comes up to me and says 'Man, I’ve never met a Jewish kid before,' and it’s like 'wow!' You know what I mean? Holy cow, where am I? I was like, 'Well, what do you think?' (laughs)."

In the summer of 2013 he played in the Cape Cod League, where he was an All Star for the Cotuit Kettleers, for which his father had played in 1988. In his sophomore year for the 2014 Vanderbilt Commodores baseball team, after an injury slowed his start he played outfield for the Commodores, who won the 2014 College World Series.

In 65 games in his junior year for the 2015 Vanderbilt Commodores baseball team, Wiseman hit .318/.419/.566 with 66 runs (2nd in the Southeastern Conference), 39 walks (tied for 6th), 16 doubles, 4 triples (10th), 14 home runs (tied for 6th), a .567 slugging percentage (8th), and stole 12 bases in 14 attempts. Wiseman was the 14th-youngest college position player. He was named an All-American. The team again made it to the College Baseball World Series finals, but lost this time. Wiseman was hit in his neck by an 89 mph fastball while batting during a College World Series game against TCU, and was hit so hard that the impact left a red mark that even showed the outlines of the baseball's laces on his neck, but stayed in the game (telling his coach "it's the College World Series, baby. You're not taking me out of this game") and went on to hit a home run innings later.

MLB Draft Guide's scouting report on him said:

“A power/speed combination in center field, Rhett Wiseman is often compared to Johnny Damon. Wiseman has a short quick swing.... A pull hitter with some loft, he has plus bat speed and good power potential. Wiseman ... is dangerous on the base paths. Wiseman shows good actions in center field and has been improving defensively. His speed allows him to cover plenty of ground and while he lacks a cannon, his arm is accurate and playable in center. Wiseman plays all out on every play, both in the field and on the bases. He is the type of player that fans and coaches will love.”

ESPNHS in their scouting report wrote: “One of the best outfielders in the 2012 class, Wiseman is a five tool prospect....” He was selected to the 2015 Jewish Sports Review College Baseball All-America team.

== Minor leagues ==
Wiseman was drafted in the third round of the 2015 Major League Baseball draft by the Washington Nationals, after having been ranked # 88 by Baseball America -- as one of its youngest top-rated college position players. The Nationals signed him for a $554,100 signing bonus in July 2015.

Wiseman began his professional career in 2015 with the Auburn Doubledays of the Low-A New York–Penn League. He was voted Player of the Week on July 20, 2015, in the New York–Penn League. He spent all of 2015 with Auburn, batting .248 with five home runs and 35 RBIs in 54 games. The Baseball America 2016 Prospect Handbook said that he had athleticism, raw tools, bat speed, strength, good route running and instincts in the outfield, and fit best in right field, but that he struck out at a high rate.

Wiseman was Washington's # 21 prospect going into the 2016 season. Wiseman spent 2016 playing for the Hagerstown Suns, of the Single-A South Atlantic League, where he posted a .255 batting average along with 13 home runs, 71 runs (tied for 7th in the South Atlantic League), 75 RBIs (5th in the league), 19 stolen bases, and 9 sacrifice hits (2nd in the league).

Wiseman spent 2017 with the Potomac Nationals of the High-A Carolina League, with whom he batted .229 with 13 home runs and 55 RBIs in 123 games.

In 2018, Wiseman played again for the Potomac Nationals, for whom he was Carolina League Player of the Week on August 26. He batted .253/.361 (tied for 10th in the Carolina League)/.484 (3rd) with 21 home runs (3rd; and leading all Washington Nationals minor leaguers), 63 walks (tied for 4th), 65 runs (tied for 8th), and 63 RBIs (9th) in 116 games. On defense in the outfield, he had nine assists. He was named a post-season Carolina League All Star.

Wiseman was named Eastern League Player of the Week on April 14, 2019, MiLB.com Eastern League Player of the Month in April 2019, and a mid-season Eastern League All Star. For the season with the Harrisburg Senators of the Double-A Eastern League, he batted .215/.298/.412 with 15 home runs (tied for 7th in the league) and 57 RBIs in 335 at bats; he also batted .308/.438/1.000 with three home runs in a four-game stint with the Auburn Doubledays of the Low-A New York-Penn League.

Wiseman did not play in a game in 2020 due to the cancellation of the minor league season because of the COVID-19 pandemic. He spent the entire 2021 season with Double-A Harrisburg, playing in 85 games and hitting .217/.277/.378 with 9 home runs and 30 RBI. He elected free agency following the season on November 7, 2021.

Wiseman soon after retired from professional baseball and became a real estate investor.

== Team Israel ==
In March 2016, Wiseman said: "I would love to play for Israel in the World Baseball Classic too. Oh my goodness. I would love that. That would be a dream. That would be incredible."

In September 2016, Wiseman played for Israel at the 2017 World Baseball Classic qualifier. Wiseman started all three games in left field, batting seventh. During the opening game, Wiseman went 1 for 3 with a walk, run scored, and RBI while being picked off and caught stealing. Wiseman went 0 for 3 in the second game, before being pinch hit for by Blake Gailen. Wiseman again went hitless in the final game, in 4 at bats, finishing the series with a .100 batting average.
