= 2015 Vanderbilt Commodores baseball team =

American college baseball season

2015 Vanderbilt Commodores baseball

SEC East Division Champions Nashville Regional Champions Champaign Super Regional Champions College World Series Final, L 1–2 vs. Virginia
- Conference: Southeastern Conference

Ranking
- Coaches: No. 2
- CB: No. 2
- Record: 51–21 (20–10 SEC)
- Head coach: Tim Corbin (13th season)
- Assistant coaches: Scott Brown (3rd season); Travis Jewett (3rd season)
- Home stadium: Hawkins Field

2015 Southeastern Conference baseball standings
	Conf.				Overall
Team	W		L	PCT	W		L	PCT
Eastern
No. 2 Vanderbilt ^{x}‍‍‍^{y}	20	–	10	.667	51	–	21	.708
No. 3 Florida ‍‍‡‍^{y}	19	–	11	.633	52	–	18	.743
Missouri ‍‍‍	15	–	15	.500	30	–	28	.517
Kentucky ‍‍‍	14	–	15	.483	30	–	25	.545
South Carolina ‍‍‍	13	–	17	.433	32	–	25	.561
Tennessee ‍‍‍	11	–	18	.379	24	–	26	.480
Georgia ‍‍‍	10	–	19	.345	26	–	28	.481
Western
No. 5 LSU ^{x}‍†‍‍^{y}	21	–	8	.724	54	–	12	.818
No. 11 Texas A&M ‍‍‍^{y}	18	–	10	.643	50	–	14	.781
No. 7 Arkansas ‍‍‍^{y}	17	–	12	.586	40	–	25	.615
Ole Miss ‍‍‍^{y}	15	–	14	.517	30	–	28	.517
Auburn ‍‍‍^{y}	13	–	17	.433	36	–	26	.581
Alabama ‍‍‍	12	–	18	.400	32	–	28	.533
Mississippi State ‍‍‍	8	–	22	.267	24	–	30	.444
x – Division champion † – Conference champion ‡ – Tournament champion y – Invited to the NCAA tournament Rankings from Collegiate Baseball

The 2015 Vanderbilt Commodores baseball team represented Vanderbilt University during the 2015 NCAA Division I baseball season. The Commodores played their home games at Hawkins Field as a member of the Southeastern Conference. They were led by head coach Tim Corbin, in his 13th season at Vanderbilt.

== Previous season ==
In 2014, the Commodores finished the season 3rd in the SEC's Eastern Division with a record of 47–19, 17–13 in conference play. They qualified for the 2014 Southeastern Conference baseball tournament and were eliminated in the second round. They qualified for the 2014 NCAA Division I baseball tournament, and were selected to host the Nashville Regional, which included Oregon, Clemson, and Xavier. The Commodores won their first three games of the regional, defeating Xavier by a score of 11–0, Oregon by a score of 7–2, and Oregon again, this time, 3–2, to advance to the Super Regional, of which they were hosts. In their first game against Stanford, the Commodores won 11–6, before dropping the second game, 4–5. In game three, Vanderbilt won, 12–5, to advance to the College World Series.

In the College World Series, Vanderbilt defeated Louisville and UC Irvine to advance to the semifinals and play Texas. In the first match-up with the Longhorns, the Commodores dropped their first game of the College World Series, losing 0–4. In the second game, the Commodores won 4–3 in ten innings, advancing to the College World Series finals to play Virginia.

Vanderbilt opened the finals against Virginia, the #3 national seed in the tournament, with a 9–8 victory. The Commodores proceeded to drop the second game, 2–7, before winning game three, 3–2. Vanderbilt were crowned national champions, their first championship in program history.

== 2015 regular season ==
After a slow start, the Commodores easily qualified for the 2015 Southeastern Conference tournament, where they finished second to the Florida Gators. They then played host to the 2015 NCAA Nashville Regional, where they defeated Lipscomb University, The University of Indiana and Radford University, the last opponent by a record-tying shutout score of 21–0. The Commodores then faced the University of Illinois in the NCAA Superegional, defeating them in a two-game sweep and advancing to the College World Series.

In 65 games in his junior year for the team, Rhett Wiseman hit .318/.419/.566 with 66 runs (2nd in the Southeastern Conference), 39 walks (tied for 6th), and 14 home runs (tied for 6th). He was named an All-American.

== 2015 NCAA College World Series ==
In their opening-round game in the 2015 College World Series, Vanderbilt defeated Cal State Fullerton, 4–3, on a walkoff home run in the bottom of the ninth in a game that had been suspended due to rain the night before, advancing into the winners' bracket. In their second-round game, Vanderbilt defeated the number 7 national seed TCU, 1–0. Zander Wiel hit a home run in the 7th inning to score the lone run of the game and break up a no-hitter.

Behind an offensive outburst and dominating performance behind the arm of Walker Buehler, the Commodores beat TCU 7–1 to advance to their second straight College World Series Championship Series. Commodores outfielder Rhett Wiseman was hit in his neck by an 89 mph fastball while batting during the game, and was hit so hard it left a red mark that even showed the outlines of the baseball's laces on his neck. He stayed in the game (telling their coach "it's the College World Series, baby. You're not taking me out of this game"). Wiseman went on to hit a home run innings later.

In game 1 of the championship series Vanderbilt defeated Virginia 5–1 thanks to an outing by Carson Fulmer. Virginia held Vanderbilt scoreless (3–0) for just the second time all year, forcing a winner-take-all third game for the national championship. The Cavaliers beat Vanderbilt 4–2 to win their first baseball national championship in program history.

== Personnel ==
=== Roster ===
2015 Vanderbilt Commodores roster
Pitchers: 13 – Walker Buehler – Junior; 15 – Carson Fulmer – Junior; 21 – John Kilichowski – Sophomore; 22 – Philip Pfeifer – (redshirt) Junior; 23 – Joey Abraham – Freshman; 24 – Jordan Sheffield – (redshirt) Freshman; 28 – Matt Ruppenthal – Freshman; 31 – Ryan Johnson – (redshirt) Freshman; 32 – Hayden Stone – Sophomore; 34 – Brendan Spagnuolo – Freshman; 35 – Ben Bowden – Sophomore; 40 – Collin Snider – Freshman; 44 – Kyle Wright – Freshman; 45 – Tyler Ferguson – Junior	Catchers: 5 – Jason Delay – Sophomore; 25 – Karl Ellison – Sophomore; 33 – Tristan Chari – Freshman; Infielders: 2 – Tyler Campbell – Junior; 7 – Dansby Swanson – Junior; 10 – Will Toffey – Freshman; 11 – Liam Sabino – Freshman; 16 – Penn Murfee – (redshirt) Freshman; 19 – Joey Mundy – Freshman; 36 – Aubrey McCarty – (redshirt) Freshman; 43 – Zander Wiel – (redshirt) Junior; 55 – Tyler Green – (redshirt) Freshman	Outfielders: 1 – Ro Coleman – Sophomore; 3 – Jeren Kendall – Freshman; 6 – Drake Parker – (redshirt) Freshman; 8 – Rhett Wiseman – Junior; 18 – Nolan Rogers – Sophomore; 20 – Bryan Reynolds – Sophomore; 39 – Kyle Smith – Junior

=== Coaching staff ===
Name	Position	Seasons at Vanderbilt	Alma mater
Tim Corbin	Head coach	13	Ohio Wesleyan University (1984)
Scott Brown	Assistant coach	3	SUNY Cortland (1999)
Travis Jewett	Assistant coach	3	Washington State University (1993)

== Schedule ==
Legend
	Vanderbilt win
	Vanderbilt loss
	Postponement
**Bold**	Vanderbilt team member

2015 Vanderbilt Commodores Game Log
Regular season
February

Date	Opponent	Rank	Site/stadium	Score	Win	Loss	Save	Attendance	Overall record	SEC record
February 13	Santa Clara	#1	Hawkins Field • Nashville, TN	4–0	**Fulmer** (1–0)	Steffens (0–1)		2,958	1–0	
February 14	Santa Clara	#1	Hawkins Field • Nashville, TN	6–7	Karalus (1–0)	**Stone** (0–1)		2,754	1–1	
February 14	Santa Clara	#1	Hawkins Field • Nashville, TN	6–5 (10)	**Sheffield** (1–0)	Karalus (1–1)		2,754	2–1	
February 18	at Belmont	#2	E. S. Rose Park • Nashville, TN	Postponed Rescheduled for April 28						
February 20	vs. Indiana State	#2	Charlotte Sports Park • Port Charlotte, FL	3–2	**Bowden** (1–0)	Keaffaber (0–1)		NA	3–1	
February 21	vs. Indiana State	#2	Charlotte Sports Park • Port Charlotte, FL	1–8	Degano (2–0)	**Stone** (0–2)		NA	3–2	
February 22	vs. Indiana State	#2	Charlotte Sports Park • Port Charlotte, FL	6–0	**Wright** (1–0)	Kuhlman (0–2)		NA	4–2	
February 24	Tennessee–Martin	#4	Hawkins Field • Nashville, TN	16–3	**Shaw** (1–2)	Shaw (0–1)		2,365	5–2	
February 25	WKU	#4	Hawkins Field • Nashville, TN	10–6	**Pfeifer** (1–0)	Pearson (0–2)		2,405	6–2	
February 27	Illinois State	#4	Hawkins Field • Nashville, TN	16–1	**Fulmer** (2–0)	Headean (1–1)		2,409	7–2	
February 28	Illinois State	#4	Hawkins Field • Nashville, TN	3–2	**Kilichowski** (1–0)	Hendren (1–1)		2,502	8–2	

March

Date	Opponent	Rank	Site/stadium	Score	Win	Loss	Save	Attendance	Overall record	SEC record
March 1	Illinois State	#4	Hawkins Field • Nashville, TN	16–10	**Bowden** (2–0)	Heilenbach (0–1)		2,758	9–2	
March 3	Evansville	#4	Hawkins Field • Nashville, TN	9–8 (12)	**Sheffield** (2–0)	Gould (0–1)		2,376	10–2	
March 6	at #7 UCLA	#4	Jackie Robinson Stadium • Los Angeles, CA	6–0	**Fulmer** (3–0)	Kaprielian (3–1)		2,204	11–2	
March 7	at #20 USC	#4	Dedeaux Field • Los Angeles, CA	5–6	Huberman (3–1)	**Bowden** (2–1)		1,401	11–3	
March 8	vs. #1 TCU	#4	Dodger Stadium • Los Angeles, CA	2–4	Morrison (3–0)	**Pfeifer** (1–1)	Ferrell (5)	NA	11–4	
March 10	Quinnipiac	#7	Hawkins Field • Nashville, TN	9–2	**Sheffield** (3–0)	Luciani (0–1)		2,444	12–4	
March 11	Quinnipiac	#7	Hawkins Field • Nashville, TN	8–0	**Johnson** (1–0)	Thomas (1–2)		2,450	13–4	
March 14	Arkansas	#7	Hawkins Field • Nashville, TN	8–7 (12)	**Bowden** (3–1)	Stone (0–2)		3,040	14–4	1–0
March 14	Arkansas	#7	Hawkins Field • Nashville, TN	9–1	**Buehler** (1–0)	Taccolini (0–2)	**Kilichowski** (1)	3,040	15–4	2–0
March 15	Arkansas	#7	Hawkins Field • Nashville, TN	1–0	**Pfeifer** (2–1)	Alberius (1–2)		3,150	16–4	3–0
March 17	Tennessee Tech	#5	Hawkins Field • Nashville, TN	9–1	**Johnson** (2–0)	Gardner (0–1)		2,813	17–4	
March 20	at #30 Auburn	#5	Plainsman Park • Auburn, AL	4–6	Thompson (4–2)	**Fulmer** (3–1)	Lipscomb (1)	2,869	17–5	3–1
March 21	at #30 Auburn	#5	Plainsman Park • Auburn, AL	10–5	**Buehler** (2–0)	Wingenter (1–2)	**Pfeifer** (3)		18–5	4–1
March 21	at #30 Auburn	#5	Plainsman Park • Auburn, AL	7–6 (10)	**Bowden** (4–1)	Yarbrough (0–1)		2,840	19–5	5–1
March 24	at Middle Tennessee	#3	Reese Smith Jr. Field • Murfreesboro, TN	12–7	**Wright** (2–0)	Alton (3–1)		2,620	20–5	
March 27	Tennessee	#3	Hawkins Field • Nashville, TN	9–0	**Fulmer** (4–1)	Marks (2–3)		3,409	21–5	6–1
March 28	Tennessee	#3	Hawkins Field • Nashville, TN	5–9	Serrano (2–3)	**Pfeifer** (2–2)		3,626	21–6	6–2
March 29	Tennessee	#3	Hawkins Field • Nashville, TN	14–3	**Johnson** (3–0)	Martin (1–1)		3,626	22–6	7–2
March 31	Wofford	#3	Hawkins Field • Nashville, TN	6–0	**Wright** (3–0)	Lance (2–1)		2,762	23–6	

April

Date	Opponent	Rank	Site/stadium	Score	Win	Loss	Save	Attendance	Overall record	SEC record
April 1	Wofford	#3	Hawkins Field • Nashville, TN	5–3	**Kilichowski** (2–0)	Accetta (1–2)	**Bowden** (1)	2,942	24–6	
April 3	at Georgia	#3	Foley Field • Athens, GA	9–7	**Fulmer** (5–1)	McLaughlin (3–2)	**Pfeifer** (4)	2,551	25–6	8–2
April 4	at Georgia	#3	Foley Field • Athens, GA	11–7	**Buehler** (3–0)	Lawlor (3–4)		3,162	26–6	9–2
April 5	at Georgia	#3	Foley Field • Athens, GA	4–2	**Wright** (4–0)	Tucker (0–1)	**Pfeifer** (5)	2,157	27–6	10–2
April 7	Lipscomb	#2	Hawkins Field • Nashville, TN	1–3	Puckett (2–1)	**Kilichowski** (2–1)	Andros	3,060	27–7	
April 9	Ole Miss	#2	Hawkins Field • Nashville, TN	6–0	**Fulmer** (6–1)	Trent		3,111	28–7	11–2
April 10	Ole Miss	#2	Hawkins Field • Nashville, TN	5–6 (16)	Weathersby	**Wright** (4–1)		3,540	28–8	11–3
April 11	Ole Miss	#2	Hawkins Field • Nashville, TN	4–5	Stokes	**Ferguson** (0–1)	Waguespack	3,626	28–9	11–4
April 14	Belmont	#7	Hawkins Field • Nashville, TN	2–3	McGrath (4–2)	**Sheffield** (3–1)	Kinney	2,886	28–10	
April 16	at South Carolina	#7	Carolina Stadium • Columbia, SC	12–0	**Fulmer** (7–1)	Fiori (3–1)		6,905	29–10	12–4
April 17	at South Carolina	#7	Carolina Stadium • Columbia, SC	2–5	Wynkoop	**Buehler** (3–1)		7,340	29–11	12–5
April 18	at South Carolina	#7	Carolina Stadium • Columbia, SC	2–3	Mincey	**Kilichowski** (2–2)	Widener (9)	8,242	29–12	12–6
April 21	Middle Tennessee	#14	Hawkins Field • Nashville, TN	4–0	**Johnson** (4–0)	Ring (4–2)		2,987	30–12	
April 24	#15 Missouri	#14	Hawkins Field • Nashville, TN	9–2	**Fulmer** (8–1)	McClain (5–5)		3,348	31–12	13–6
April 25	#15 Missouri	#14	Hawkins Field • Nashville, TN	12–2	**Pfeifer** (3–2)	Houck (6–3)		3,424	32–12	14–6
April 26	#15 Missouri	#14	Hawkins Field • Nashville, TN	12–2	**Bowden** (5–1)	Tribby (0–3)		3,496	33–12	15–6
April 28	at Belmont	#9	E. S. Rose Park • Nashville, TN	1–4	McGrath	**Kilichowski** (2–3)	Kinney (5)	918	33–13	

May

Date	Opponent	Rank	Site/stadium	Score	Win	Loss	Save	Attendance	Overall record	SEC record
May 1	at Kentucky	#9	Cliff Hagan Stadium • Lexington, KY	13–3	**Fulmer** (9–1)	Brown (4–5)		2,655	34–13	16–6
May 2	at Kentucky	#9	Cliff Hagan Stadium • Lexington, KY	5–11	Beggs (7–2)	**Pfeifer** (3–3)		2,512	34–14	16–7
May 3	at Kentucky	#9	Cliff Hagan Stadium • Lexington, KY	7–3	**Sheffield** (4–1)	Strecker (2–1)	**Bowden** (2)	3,043	35–14	17–7
May 7	#14 Florida	#11	Hawkins Field • Nashville, TN	2–0	**Fulmer** (10–1)	Shore (6–5)		3,626	36–14	18–7
May 8	#14 Florida	#11	Hawkins Field • Nashville, TN	3–7	Puk (7–3)	**Pfeifer** (3–4)		3,626	36–15	18–8
May 9	#14 Florida	#11	Hawkins Field • Nashville, TN	7–9	Lewis (4–1)	**Sheffield** (4–2)		3,626	36–16	18–9
May 12	at #3 Louisville	#10	Jim Patterson Stadium • Louisville, KY	5–2	**Johnson** (5–0)	McClure (1–1)	**Kilichowski (2)**	5,042	37–16	
May 14	at Alabama	#10	Hoover Metropolitan Stadium • Hoover, AL	2–1	**Fulmer** (11–1)	Guilbeau (2–6)		2,906	38–16	19–9
May 15	at Alabama	#10	Hoover Metropolitan Stadium • Hoover, AL	7–5	**Sheffield** (5–2)	Walter (4–4)	**Wright** (1)	3,515	39–16	20–9
May 16	at Alabama	#10	Hoover Metropolitan Stadium • Hoover, AL	0–1	Carter (4–5)	**Buehler** (3–2)	Burrow (6)	3,684	39–17	20–10

Postseason
SEC Tournament

Date	Opponent	Rank	Site/stadium	Score	Win	Loss	Save	Attendance	Overall record	SECT Record
May 20	Missouri	#7	Hoover Metropolitan Stadium • Hoover, AL	7–6 (10)	**Wright** (5–1)	Williams (4–4)		5,205	40–17	1–0
May 21	#8 Texas A&M	#7	Hoover Metropolitan Stadium • Hoover, AL	6–1	Kent (7–1)	**Fulmer** (11–2)		8,361	40–18	1–1
May 22	Alabama	#7	Hoover Metropolitan Stadium • Hoover, AL	16–1 (7)	**Pfeifer** (4–4)	Carter (4–6)		10,329	41–18	2–1
May 23	#8 Texas A&M	#7	Hoover Metropolitan Stadium • Hoover, AL	12–3	**Kilichowski** (3–3)	Vinson 4–2		10,949	42–18	3–1
May 24	#9 Florida	#7	Hoover Metropolitan Stadium • Hoover, AL	7–3	Young (2–0)	**Johnson** (5–1)		7,998	42–19	3–2

NCAA tournament: Nashville Regional

Date	Opponent	Site/stadium	Score	Win	Loss	Save	Attendance	Overall record	NCAAT Record
May 29	(4) Lipscomb	Hawkins Field • Nashville, TN	11–0	**Fulmer (12–2)**	Martinez (7–4)		3,626	43–19	1–0
May 30	(3) Indiana	Hawkins Field • Nashville, TN	6–4	**Bowden (6–1)**	Harrison (4–2)	**Wright** (2)	3,626	44–19	2–0
June 1	(2) Radford	Hawkins Field • Nashville, TN	21–0	**Buehler (4–2)**	MacKeith (7–5)		3,626	45–19	3–0

NCAA tournament: Champaign Super Regional

Date	Opponent	Site/stadium	Score	Win	Loss	Save	Attendance	Overall record	NCAAT Record
June 6	(6) Illinois	Illinois Field • Champaign, IL	13–0	**Fulmer** (13–2)	Duchene 11–2		3,605	46–19	4–0
June 8	(6) Illinois	Illinois Field • Champaign, IL	4–2	**Pfeifer** (5–4)	Jay (5–2)	**Wright** (3)	3,767	47–19	5–0

College World Series

Date	Opponent	Site/stadium	Score	Win	Loss	Save	Attendance	Overall record	CWS Record
June 14/15	Cal State Fullerton	TD Ameritrade Park • Omaha, NE	4–3	**Wright** 6–1	Peitzmeier (5–4)		21,674	48–19	1–0
June 16	(7) TCU	TD Ameritrade Park • Omaha, NE	1–0	**Pfeifer** (6–4)	Young (9–3)	**Wright** (4)	24,156	49–19	2–0
June 19	(7) TCU	TD Ameritrade Park • Omaha, NE	7–1	**Buehler** (5–2)	Alexander (6–3)		26,011	50–19	3–0
June 22	Virginia	TD Ameritrade Park • Omaha, NE	5–1	**Fulmer** (14–2)	Jones (7–3)		21,652	51–19	4–0
June 23	Virginia	TD Ameritrade Park • Omaha, NE	0–3	Sborz (7–2)	**Pfeifer** (6–5)		24,645	51–20	4–1
June 24	Virginia	TD Ameritrade Park • Omaha, NE	2–4	Waddell (5–5)	**Kilichowski** (3–4)	Kirby (1)	17,689	51–21	4–2

All rankings from Collegiate Baseball.

== Record vs. conference opponents ==
Last two do not qualify for conf. tourn. Blank are not scheduled. Blue are home games, otherwise away.

2015 SEC baseball records Source: 2015 SEC baseball game results
Team	W–L	ALA	ARK	AUB	FLA	UGA	KEN	LSU	MSU	MIZZ	MISS	SCAR	TENN	TAMU	VAN	Team	Div	SR	SW
ALA	12–18		0–3	3–0	1–2	2–1	.	0–3	2–1	1–2	1–2	.	.	1–2	1–2	ALA	W6	3–7	1–2
ARK	17–12	3–0		2–1	.	2–1	2–1	1–2	2–1	.	2–1	.	1–1	2–1	0–3	ARK	W3	7–2	1–1
AUB	13–17	0–3	1–2		1–2	3–0	.	1–2	2–1	.	2–1	2–1	.	0–3	1–2	AUB	W5	4–6	1–2
FLA	19–11	2–1	.	2–1		2–1	1–2	.	3–0	1–2	1–2	3–0	2–1	.	2–1	FLA	E2	7–3	2–0
UGA	10–19	1–2	1–2	0–3	1–2		2–1	0–2	.	0–3	.	2–1	3–0	.	0–3	UGA	E7	3–7	1–3
KEN	14–15	.	1–2	.	2–1	1–2		2–1	2–1	2–1	.	0–3	3–0	0–2	1–2	KEN	E4	5–5	1–1
LSU	21–8	3–0	2–1	2–1	.	2–0	1–2		2–1	3–0	2–1	2–1	.	2–1	.	LSU	W1	9–1	2–0
MSU	8–22	1–2	1–2	1–2	0–3	.	1–2	1–2		.	0–3	2–1	0–3	1–2	.	MSU	W7	1–9	0–3
MIZZ	15–15	2–1	.	.	2–1	3–0	1–2	0–3	.		2–1	2–1	2–1	1–2	0–3	MIZZ	E3	6–4	1–2
MISS	15–14	2–1	1–2	1–2	2–1	.	.	1–2	3–0	1–2		.	1–2	1–1	2–1	MISS	W4	4–5	1–0
SCAR	13–17	.	.	1–2	0–3	1–2	3–0	1–2	1–2	1–2	.		1–2	2–1	2–1	SCAR	E5	3–7	1–1
TENN	11–18	.	1–1	.	1–2	0–3	0–3	.	3–0	1–2	2–1	2–1		0–3	1–2	TENN	E6	3–6	1–3
TAMU	18–10	2–1	1–2	3–0	.	.	2–0	1–2	2–1	2–1	1–1	1–2	3–0		.	TAMU	W2	6–3	2–0
VAN	20–10	2–1	3–0	2–1	1–2	3–0	2–1	.	.	3–0	1–2	1–2	2–1	.		VAN	E1	7–3	3–0
Team	W–L	ALA	ARK	AUB	FLA	UGA	KEN	LSU	MSU	MIZZ	MISS	SCAR	TENN	TAMU	VAN	Team	Div	SR	SW

Updated for entire regular season.

== Rankings ==
Ranking movements Legend: ██ Increase in ranking ██ Decrease in ranking
	Week																		
Poll	Pre	1	2	3	4	5	6	7	8	9	10	11	12	13	14	15	16	17	Final
Coaches'	1	1*	1	4	5	5	3	3	2	4	9	6	8	10	9	9	9	9	
Baseball America	1	1	1	1	5	4	2	1	1	5	8	6	6	7	7	5	5	5	
Collegiate Baseball^	1	2	4	4	7	5	3	3	2	7	14	9	11	10	7	8	7	5	
NCBWA†	1	3	5	5	6	4	2	1	1	5	9	7	9	11	10	9	7	7	

^ Collegiate Baseball ranked 40 teams in their preseason poll, but only ranked 30 teams weekly during the season.
† NCBWA ranks 30 teams in their preseason poll, but only ranks 25 teams weekly during the season.
* A new poll was not released for this week, so for comparison purposes, the previous week's ranking is inserted in this week's slot.

== Awards and honors ==
Carson Fulmer

- Louisville Slugger Pre-season First team All-American
- Perfect Game USA Pre-season First team All-American
- Baseball America Pre-season First team All-American
- SEC Pitcher of the Year
- Won SEC Pitching Triple Crown (Wins, ERA, and Strikeouts)
- Collegiate Baseball First team All-American
- First team All-SEC
- SEC All-Defensive Team
- Golden Spikes Finalist
- Nashville NCAA Regional All-Tournament

Walker Buehler

- Louisville Slugger Pre-season First team All-American
- Perfect Game USA Pre-season First team All-American
- Baseball America Pre-season First team All-American

Dansby Swanson

- Louisville Slugger Pre-season First team All-American
- Perfect Game USA Pre-season First team All-American
- Baseball America Pre-season first-team All-American
- College Baseball second-team All-American
- Second Team All-SEC
- Golden Spikes finalist
- SEC All-Tournament
- MVP of the Nashville NCAA Regional

Zander Wiel

- SEC All-Tournament
- Nashville NCAA Regional All-Tournament

Rhett Wiseman

- Nashville NCAA Regional All-Tournament

Bryan Reynolds

- Louisville Slugger Pre-season Third team All-American
- Perfect Game USA Pre-season Second team All-American
- SEC All-Tournament
- Nashville NCAA Regional All-Tournament

Ro Coleman

- Nashville NCAA Regional All-Tournament

Jeren Kendall

- Freshman All-SEC
- Nashville NCAA Regional All-Tournament

Will Toffey

- Freshman All-SEC

Kyle Wright

- Freshman All-SEC

== Commodores in the MLB draft ==
Round	Selection	Player	Position	Team
1	1	Dansby Swanson	SS	Arizona Diamondbacks
1	8	Carson Fulmer	RHP	Chicago White Sox
1	24	Walker Buehler	RHP	Los Angeles Dodgers
3	101	Phillip Pfeifer	LHP	Los Angeles Dodgers
3	103	Rhett Wiseman	OF	Washington Nationals
6	168	Tyler Ferguson	RHP	Texas Rangers
12	350	Zander Wiel	1B	Minnesota Twins
19	558	Xavier Turner	3B	Texas Rangers
39	1,163	John Kilichowski	LHP	Chicago Cubs
