= Casey Weathers =

American baseball player and coach (born 1985)

Athletics
- Pitcher / Coach
- Born: June 10, 1985 (age 41); Elk Grove, California, U.S.
- Bats: Right Throws: Right
- Stats at Baseball Reference

Teams
- As coach: Athletics (2027–present)
Medals
Men's baseball
Representing United States
Olympic Games
Bronze medal – third place	2008 Beijing	Team
World University Baseball Championship
Gold medal – first place	2006 Havana	National team

Casey Brixton Weathers (born June 10, 1985) is an American professional baseball coach and former pitcher who currently serves as the pitching coach for the Athletics of Major League Baseball (MLB). He was selected with the eighth overall pick in the 2007 MLB draft by the Colorado Rockies. He played college baseball for the Vanderbilt Commodores.

== Amateur career ==
Weathers attended Laguna Creek High School in Elk Grove, California, and then Sacramento City College where he played in the outfield. During one practice, Weathers claimed he could throw harder than teammate Adam Eisner. This ongoing banter led to Weathers lighting up the radar gun for fun. Despite his wanting to remain an outfielder, once he hit 94 MPH on the gun, he was eventually converted to a pitcher by the coaching staff. Weathers was also teammates with Stephen Bautista, Brian Smith, Shaun Stinson, and future MLB pitcher David Hernandez on the semi-pro Elk Grove Leprechauns where he led the league in home runs.

After two years at Sacramento City College, Weathers transferred to Vanderbilt University. After his first year at Vanderbilt, Weathers participated in the Alaskan Summer League and was a late addition to the Team USA roster where he joined manager Tim Corbin and teammates David Price and Pedro Alvarez. Weathers enjoyed a successful senior season at Vanderbilt where he led the team in saves and tied for the team lead in wins. He was named a First Team All American and a finalist for National Stopper of the Year.

== Professional career ==
=== Colorado Rockies ===
Weathers was drafted by the Colorado Rockies with the 8th overall pick of the 2007 Major League Baseball draft and signed a contract on June 18, 2007, which included a $1.8 million signing bonus.

On October 31, 2008, Weathers underwent Tommy John surgery to repair his pitching elbow. He was added to the Rockies' 40-man roster after the 2010 season, in order to be protected from the Rule 5 draft.

=== Chicago Cubs ===
On December 8, 2011, Weathers was traded along with Ian Stewart to the Chicago Cubs in exchange for Tyler Colvin and DJ LeMahieu.

On March 13, 2012, Weathers was outrighted to the minor leagues and opened the 2012 season with the Double–A Tennessee Smokies.

=== Tampa Bay Rays ===
Weathers signed a minor league deal with the San Francisco Giants in December 2013. He was released in March 2014.

On May 26, 2014, Weathers signed a minor league deal with the Tampa Bay Rays.

=== Cleveland Indians ===
On December 31, 2014, Weathers signed a minor league contract with the Cleveland Indians. He split the 2015 season between the High–A Lynchburg Hillcats and Double–A Akron RubberDucks, registering a combined 3.10 ERA with 55 strikeouts and 4 saves across 49 1/3 innings pitched.

Weathers spent the 2016 campaign with Akron, making 23 appearances and logging a 3.54 ERA with 30 strikeouts across 28 innings of work. He elected free agency following the season on November 7, 2016.

=== Fargo-Moorhead RedHawks ===
On April 20, 2017, Weathers signed with the Fargo-Moorhead RedHawks of the American Association of Independent Professional Baseball. He was released on December 15, 2017.

== Coaching career ==
Weathers was hired prior to the 2020 season by the Cincinnati Reds as a rehabilitation coach and Arizona League pitching coach. Beginning in 2022, Weathers began serving as the pitching coach of the Triple-A Louisville Bats.

On November 18, 2026, Weathers was hired by the Athletics to serve as the team's pitching coach.

== International career ==
Weathers pitched for the United States national baseball team in the 2008 Summer Olympics, winning the Bronze medal. He pitched in three games, recording a save in Match #28 against Japan.

== Awards and honors ==
- 2007 Baseball America First Team All American
- 2007 Collegiate Baseball First Team All American
- 2007 American Baseball Coaches Association First Team All American
- 2007 National Collegiate Baseball Writers Association Third Team All American
- 2007 First Team All SEC

== Scouting report ==
Weathers has two power offerings and durability, as evidenced by back-to-back outings over an early February 2007 weekend.
