= Ian Stewart (baseball) =

American baseball player (born 1985)

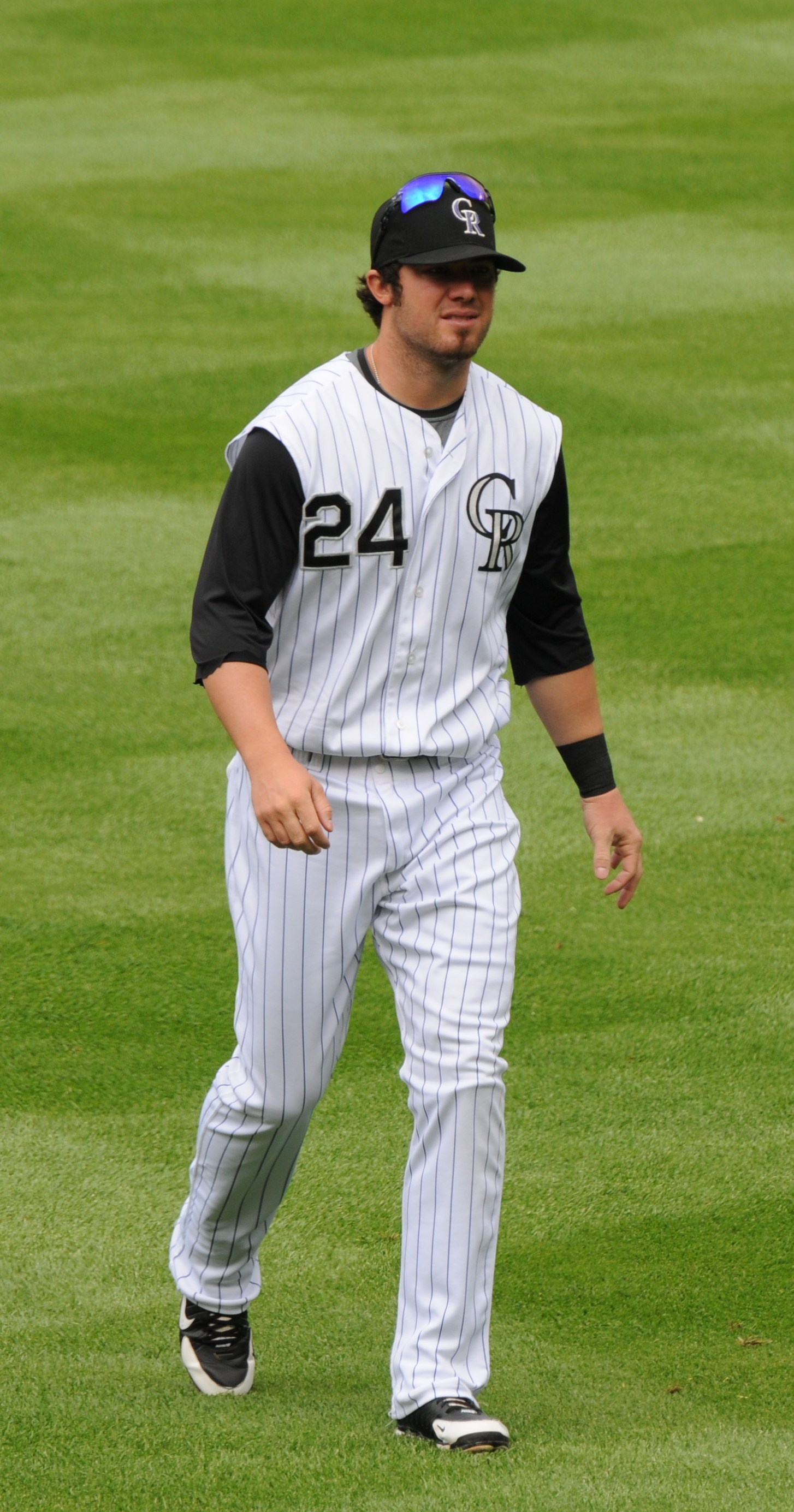
- Stewart with the Colorado Rockies in 2008
- Third baseman
- Born: April 5, 1985 (age 41); Long Beach, California, U.S.
- Batted: Left Threw: Right

MLB debut
- August 11, 2007, for the Colorado Rockies

Last MLB appearance
- May 11, 2014, for the Los Angeles Angels of Anaheim

MLB statistics
- Batting average: .230
- Home runs: 62
- Runs batted in: 213
- Stats at Baseball Reference

Teams
- Colorado Rockies (2007–2011); Chicago Cubs (2012); Los Angeles Angels of Anaheim (2014)
Medals
Men's baseball
Representing United States
World Junior Baseball Championship
| Bronze medal – third place | 2002 Sherbrooke | Team |

Ian Kenneth Stewart (born April 5, 1985) is an American former professional baseball third baseman. He played in Major League Baseball (MLB) for the Colorado Rockies, Chicago Cubs, and Los Angeles Angels of Anaheim.

== Baseball career ==
=== Colorado Rockies ===
Drafted in the 2003 MLB draft first round out of La Quinta High School in Westminster, California, Stewart showed great promise in short-season rookie-league ball with the Casper Rockies in the Pioneer League. His .401 on-base percentage and .558 slugging average appeared to justify his first-round selection. In 2004, Stewart continued to progress in Low-A with the Asheville Tourists in the South Atlantic League with a .398 OBP and .594 SLG. Baseball America ranked him as the fourth best prospect in baseball behind Delmon Young, Félix Hernández, and Joe Mauer.

In 2005, Stewart began play in High-A for the Modesto Nuts of the California League. He got off to a very slow start, hitting for a low average with little power. Stewart went to extended spring training and came back to play with Modesto in June, 2005. Up until June 20, Stewart was hitting under .230 with few home runs. However, Stewart rebounded later in the season and finished with a respectable .353 OBP and .497 SLG, although he showed a worrisome tendency to strike out.

Stewart played in the Arizona Fall League after the conclusion of the 2005 minor league season. Here, Stewart got off to a good start with impressive power. Unfortunately, he suffered a wrist injury while sliding into second base. The MRI showed limited damage, and he was shut down for the rest of the AFL.

Stewart was invited to the Rockies' 2006 spring training. He began well, hitting six home runs and batting over .400 in the first few games. Stewart re-established himself as a power-hitting prospect, and the Rockies assigned him to the Tulsa Drillers of the Double-A Texas League. Here Stewart began the season well, but fell into a slump that sent his average to .235 in mid-May before being sidelined with another injury. The injury was not serious, and Stewart only missed ten games. When he returned, Stewart improved noticeably and finished the season with a .351 on-base percentage and a .452 slugging average. In 2007, he was selected to the All-Star Futures Game.

Stewart had his contract purchased to the 40-man roster on August 11, 2007, when Jeff Baker was placed on the disabled list. He made his major league debut on that same day when he started the game at third base. Stewart was hitless in two at-bats but scored a run after he was hit by a pitch. His first hit was a double off Kerry Wood of the Chicago Cubs on August 12. Stewart hit his first major league home run, a grand slam on August 21, 2007, against Tony Armas Jr. of the Pittsburgh Pirates, making him only the second Rockie ever to hit a grand slam as his first major league home run.

Stewart struggled early, striking out 28 times in his first 55 at-bats, and was sent down to the Triple-A Colorado Springs Sky Sox to regain his hitting stroke. He found it once again, and was called back to the Majors on July 19. Stewart won the starting third base job when Garrett Atkins moved to first base in place for the injured Todd Helton.

Stewart received the NL Rookie of the Month award for his accomplishments in July 2008. He hit .432 with one home run, five doubles, eight runs scored and 15 RBI in 12 games during the month of July. He also had a .614 slugging percentage and a .519 on-base percentage.

After playing as the Rockies regular third baseman for most of 2009 and 2010, Stewart split 2011 between the Majors and Triple-A. In parts of 5 seasons with the Rockies, he hit .236 with 54 home runs and 187 RBI in 432 games.

=== Chicago Cubs ===
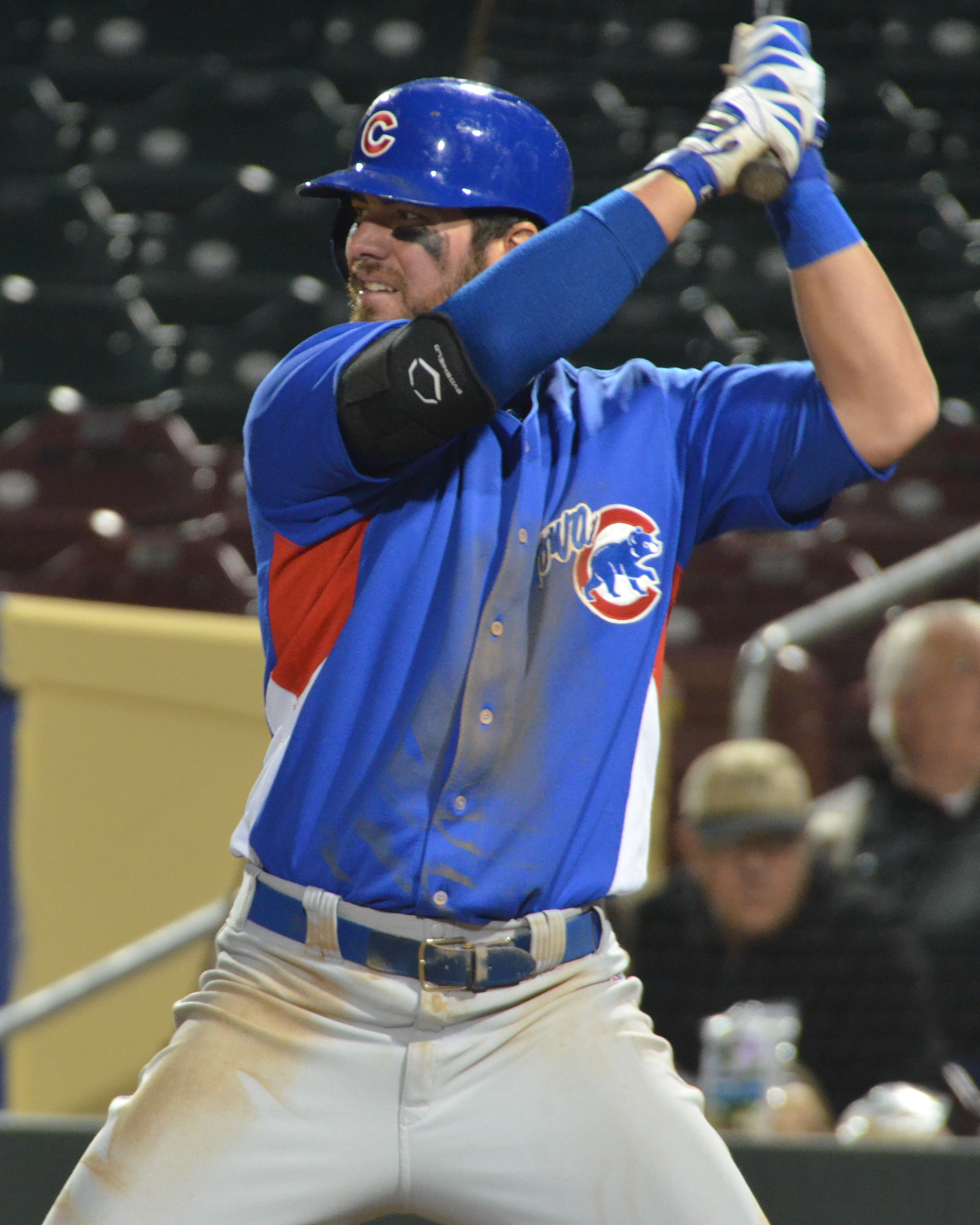
Stewart batting for the Iowa Cubs, triple-A affiliates of the Chicago Cubs, in 2013

On December 8, 2011, Stewart was traded from the Colorado Rockies along with Casey Weathers to the Chicago Cubs in exchange for Tyler Colvin and DJ LeMahieu.

He started the season playing third base with occasional starts by Jeff Baker, another former Rockie. On July 16, 2012, Stewart underwent wrist surgery and was put on the 60-day disabled list. In 55 games he hit .201 with 5 home runs and 17 RBI.

On December 6, 2012, Stewart re-signed a 1-year $2 million deal with the Cubs. He played in 40 games with the Triple-A Iowa Cubs, hitting .168. In June 2013, Stewart was suspended ten games for making critical comments about the team on Twitter, which led to his release on June 25.

=== Los Angeles Dodgers ===
On July 5, 2013, he signed a minor league contract with the Los Angeles Dodgers, who assigned him to the Triple-A Albuquerque Isotopes. He hit just .174 in 27 games before he was released on August 12.

=== Los Angeles Angels of Anaheim ===
On January 22, 2014, Stewart signed a minor league contract with the Los Angeles Angels of Anaheim. Stewart won a bench role with the Angels after a strong spring training. In 24 games for the Angels, he batted .177/.222/.382 with two home runs, seven RBI, and one stolen base. Stewart was designated for assignment on July 19. He cleared waivers and was sent outright to the Triple-A Salt Lake Bees on July 22. In 36 games for the Bees, Stewart hit .198/.310/.347 with five home runs and 13 RBI.

=== Washington Nationals ===
On December 26, 2014, Stewart signed a minor league contract with the Washington Nationals. In 48 games for the Triple-A Syracuse Chiefs, he batted .200/.310/.400 with seven home runs and 22 RBI. Stewart was released by the Nationals organization on June 5, 2015.

Awards
| Preceded by Jair Jurrjens | National League Rookie of the Month; July 2008 | Succeeded by Geovany Soto |
