= Connor Jones (baseball) =

American baseball player (born 1994)

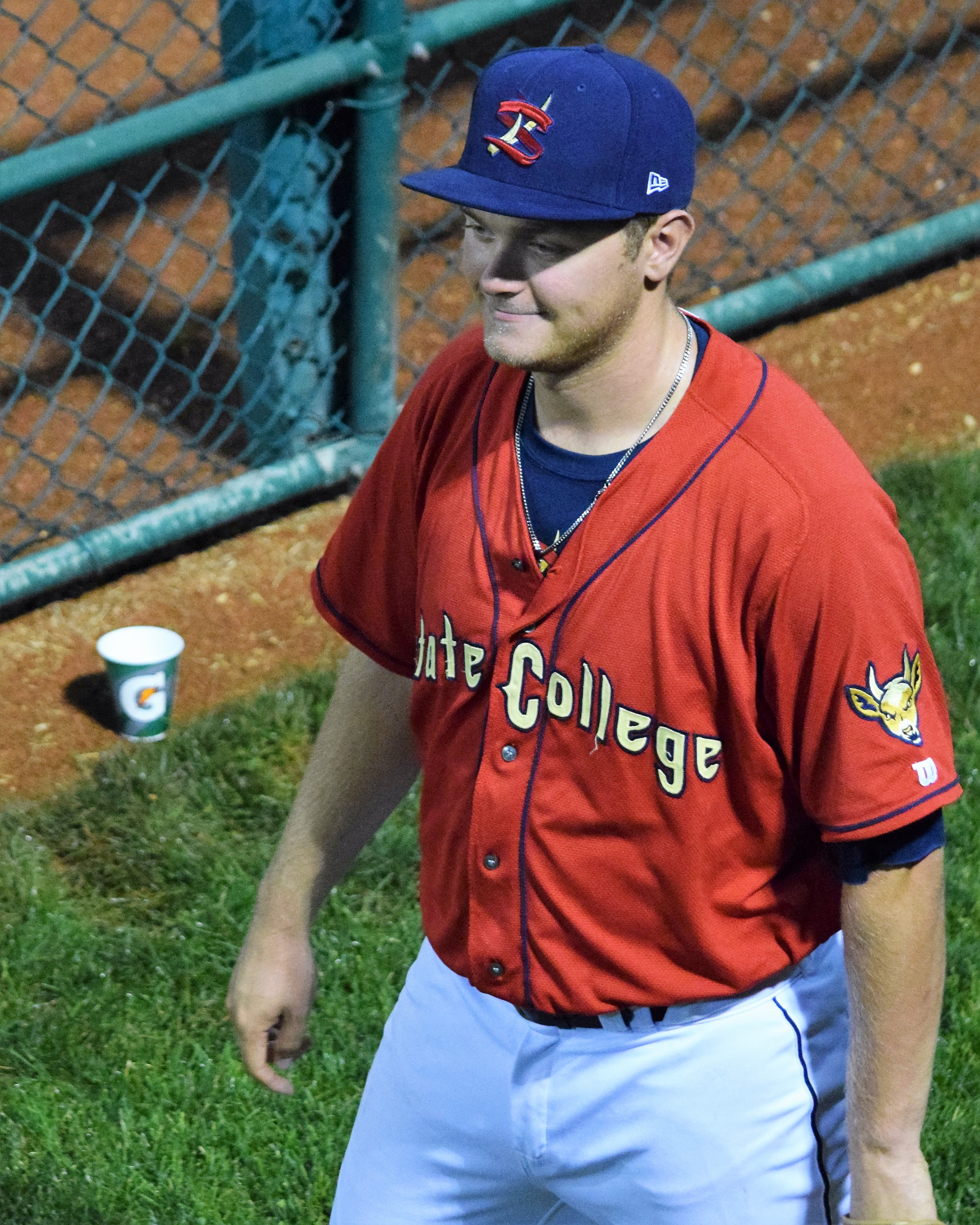
- Jones with the State College Spikes in 2016
- Pitcher
- Born: October 10, 1994 (age 31); Hartford, Connecticut, U.S.
- Bats: Right Throws: Right
- Stats at Baseball Reference

Connor Wesley Jones (born October 10, 1994) is an American former professional baseball pitcher.

== Amateur career ==
Jones attended Great Bridge High School in Chesapeake, Virginia. During his high school career he went 22–3 with a 1.68 earned run average (ERA). Jones was drafted by the San Diego Padres in the 21st round of the 2013 Major League Baseball draft but did not sign and attended the University of Virginia to play college baseball for the Virginia Cavaliers.

Jones spent his freshman year at Virginia mostly pitching out of the bullpen. He appeared in 25 games with one start and went 4–1 with a 3.13 ERA, 40 strikeouts and one save. As a sophomore in 2015, Jones became a starter and eventually became Virginia's ace after an injury to Nathan Kirby. He started the first game of the 2015 College World Series against Vanderbilt and took the loss after giving up four runs in 6 1/3 innings. Overall, he started 18 games, going 7–3 with a 3.19 ERA and 113 strikeouts. After the season, he played for the United States collegiate national team. Jones returned as Virginia's number one starter his junior year in 2016. In 15 starts, he was 11-1 with a 2.34 ERA and 1.19 WHIP.

== Professional career ==
=== St. Louis Cardinals ===
Jones was selected in the 2016 Major League Baseball draft in the second round by the St. Louis Cardinals. He signed for $1.1 million, was assigned to the Gulf Coast League Cardinals, and was later promoted to the State College Spikes. He finished 2016 with a combined 3.68 ERA over 14 2/3 innings pitched with both teams. Jones spent a majority of the 2017 season with the Palm Beach Cardinals, starting 21 games and going 8-5 with a 3.97 ERA and 76 strikeouts over 113 1/3 innings. He pitched it one game for the Springfield Cardinals at the end of the season.

Jones began 2018 with Springfield. He was placed on the disabled list retroactive to April 16 and he was activated on May 6. He spent a majority of the year with Springfield, going 5-5 with a 3.80 ERA over 22 games (17 starts). He also started four games for the Memphis Redbirds, compiling a 6.46 ERA over 15 1/3 innings. After the season, the Cardinals assigned Jones to the Surprise Saguaros of the Arizona Fall League (AFL). In 2019, he spent a majority of the year back with Springfield, going 1-1 with a 4.66 ERA and 49 strikeouts over 48 1/3 innings pitched in relief. he returned to Memphis for a brief point at the season's end. He did not play in a game in 2020 due to the cancellation of the minor league season because of the COVID-19 pandemic. Jones spent the 2021 season with Memphis with whom he went 5-6 with a 5.91 ERA and fifty strikeouts over 56 1/3 innings. Jones was released by the Cardinals on March 28, 2022.

=== Seattle Mariners ===
On March 31, 2022, Jones signed a minor league contract with the Seattle Mariners organization. Jones spent the year with the Double-A Arkansas Travelers, starting 17 games but struggling to a 4-8 record and 7.02 ERA with 64 strikeouts in 74 1/3 innings pitched. On August 4, Jones underwent Tommy John surgery and missed the remainder of the season. He elected free agency following the season on November 10.

== Coaching career ==
On May 8, 2024, Jones was announced as a head coach and the president of the Canes Tampa baseball club.
