= Tim Corbin =

American baseball coach (born 1961)

Current position
- Title: Head coach
- Team: Vanderbilt
- Conference: SEC
- Record: 964–461–1 (.676)
- Annual salary: $2.317 million

Biographical details
- Born: August 5, 1961 (age 65); Wolfeboro, New Hampshire, U.S.
- Education: Ohio Wesleyan ('84)

Coaching career (HC unless noted)
- 1988–1993: Presbyterian
- 1994–2002: Clemson (assistant)
- 2003–present: Vanderbilt

Head coaching record
- Overall: 1,070–599–1

Accomplishments and honors

Championships
- 2× NCAA (2014, 2019); 5× CWS Appearances (2011, 2014, 2015, 2019, 2021); 4× SEC (2007, 2011, 2013, 2019); 4× SEC Tournament (2007, 2019, 2023, 2025); 5× SEC East Division (2007, 2011, 2013, 2015, 2019)

Awards
- 2× ABCA/Diamond National Coach of the Year (2014, 2019) ABCA/Diamond South Regional Coach of the Year (2015); ABCA/Dave Keilitz Ethics in Coaching Award (2019); 3× SEC Coach of the Year (2007, 2013, 2019); 2007 National Coach of the Year (CollegeBaseballInsider.com); 2014 National Coach of the Year (Baseball America, Collegiate Baseball, Perfect Game) 2019 National Coach of the Year (American Baseball Coaches Association, Collegiate Baseball)

Timothy Carter Corbin (born August 5, 1961) is an American college baseball coach who is currently the head baseball coach for the Vanderbilt Commodores. Since becoming coach at Vanderbilt in 2003, Corbin has transformed the Commodores from a perennial Southeastern Conference doormat to an elite program. When he arrived in 2003, Vanderbilt had only had six winning seasons in SEC play since baseball became a scholarship sport in 1968, and had only been to three NCAA tournaments in school history. Since then, they have been to all but one NCAA tournament since 2004.

On June 25, 2014, he led the team to Vanderbilt's first ever men's NCAA Championship in any sport, winning the College World Series. In his first ten years, Corbin amassed a 411–217 record with the Commodores. His 2013 Commodores team set an SEC record for wins, going 26-3 in conference. On May 2, 2014, Corbin won his 500th game at Vanderbilt in an 8-3 victory over Missouri.

Before coming to Vanderbilt, Corbin served as an assistant coach at Clemson for nine years and as head coach at Presbyterian for six years. At Clemson, he worked under head coach Jack Leggett, on the same staff with future head coaches and SEC rivals Kevin O'Sullivan and John Pawlowski. He coached three ACC Players of the Year and helped Clemson reach the College World Series four times (1995, 1996, 2000, and 2002). At Presbyterian, Corbin helped direct a program that was dormant for several years. He compiled a 106-138 record with the Blue Hose, which was transitioning from NAIA to NCAA Division II. The Blue Hose made three consecutive appearances in the South Atlantic Conference playoffs (1991–93), and Corbin earned South Atlantic Coach of the Year honors in 1990. In 2000, he was named the ABCA/Baseball America Assistant Coach of the Year.

Corbin also served as manager for the USA Baseball National Team during the summer of 2006. He led the team to a 28-2-1 record that culminated with a gold medal finish at the FISU (International University Sports Federation) World University Championship in Havana, Cuba. The .919 winning percentage was the highest ever for a national team and it garnered special recognition by the United States Olympic Committee in September. Additionally, Corbin managed three of his Commodore players on this team: David Price, Pedro Alvarez, and Casey Weathers.

== Head coaching record ==
Record table
Season	Team	Overall	Conference	Standing	Postseason
Presbyterian Blue Hose (South Atlantic Conference) (1988–1993)
1988	Presbyterian	4–20			
1989	Presbyterian	13–24			
1990	Presbyterian	21–24	8–12	6th	
1991	Presbyterian	22–21	11–10	5th	
1992	Presbyterian	22–22	12–9	4th	
1993	Presbyterian	24–27	9–12	6th	
Presbyterian:		106–138	40–43		
Vanderbilt Commodores (Southeastern Conference) (2003–present)
2003	Vanderbilt	27–28	14–16	2nd (East)	
2004	Vanderbilt	45–19	16–14	4th (East)	NCAA Super Regional
2005	Vanderbilt	34–21	13–17	4th (East)	
2006	Vanderbilt	38–27	16–14	3rd (East)	NCAA regional
2007	Vanderbilt	54–13	22–8	1st (East)	NCAA regional
2008	Vanderbilt	41–22	15–14	4th (East)	NCAA regional
2009	Vanderbilt	37–27	12–17	4th (East)	NCAA regional
2010	Vanderbilt	46–20	16–12	3rd (East)	NCAA Super Regional
2011	Vanderbilt	54–12	22–8	T–1st (East)	College World Series
2012	Vanderbilt	35–28	16–14	4th (East)	NCAA regional
2013	Vanderbilt	54–12	26–3	1st (East)	NCAA Super Regional
2014	Vanderbilt	51–21	17–13	3rd (East)	College World Series Champions
2015	Vanderbilt	51–21	20–10	1st (East)	College World Series Runner-Up
2016	Vanderbilt	43–19	18–12	3rd (East)	NCAA regional
2017	Vanderbilt	36–25–1	15–13–1	3rd (East)	NCAA Super Regional
2018	Vanderbilt	35–27	16–14	4th (East)	NCAA Super Regional
2019	Vanderbilt	59–12	23–7	1st (East)	College World Series Champions
2020	Vanderbilt	13–5	0–0	(East)	Season canceled due to COVID-19
2021	Vanderbilt	49–18	19–10	2nd (East)	College World Series Runner-Up
2022	Vanderbilt	39–23	14–16	4th (East)	NCAA regional
2023	Vanderbilt	42–20	19–11	2nd (East)	NCAA regional
2024	Vanderbilt	38–23	13–17	T–4th (East)	NCAA regional
2025	Vanderbilt	43–18	19–11	T–3rd	NCAA regional
Vanderbilt:		964–461–1	381–271–1		
Total:		1,070–599–1			
National champion Postseason invitational champion Conference regular season champion Conference regular season and conference tournament champion Division regular season champion Division regular season and conference tournament champion Conference tournament champion

== First-round MLB draft picks coached ==
At Vanderbilt, Corbin has coached twenty players selected in the first round of the Major League Baseball draft, including two selected first overall, and one (Kumar Rocker) selected in the first round in two different drafts.

- Jeremy Sowers (6th overall, Cleveland Indians, 2004 MLB draft)
- David Price (1st overall, Tampa Bay Rays, 2007 MLB draft)
- Casey Weathers (8th overall, Colorado Rockies, 2007 MLB draft)
- Pedro Alvarez (2nd overall, Pittsburgh Pirates, 2008 MLB draft)
- Ryan Flaherty (41st overall, Chicago Cubs, 2008 MLB draft)
- Mike Minor (7th overall, Atlanta Braves, 2009 MLB draft)
- Sonny Gray (18th overall, Oakland Athletics, 2011 MLB draft)
- Grayson Garvin (59th overall, Tampa Bay Rays, 2011 MLB draft)
- Tyler Beede (14th overall, San Francisco Giants, 2014 MLB draft)
- Dansby Swanson (1st overall, Arizona Diamondbacks, 2015 MLB draft)
- Carson Fulmer (8th overall, Chicago White Sox, 2015 MLB draft)
- Walker Buehler (24th overall, Los Angeles Dodgers, 2015 MLB draft)
- Kyle Wright (5th overall, Atlanta Braves, 2017 MLB draft)
- Jeren Kendall (23rd overall, Los Angeles Dodgers, 2017 MLB draft)
- JJ Bleday (4th overall, Miami Marlins, 2019 MLB draft)
- Austin Martin (5th overall, Toronto Blue Jays, 2020 MLB draft)
- Jack Leiter (2nd overall, Texas Rangers, 2021 MLB draft)
- Kumar Rocker (10th overall, New York Mets, 2021 MLB draft; & 3rd overall, Texas Rangers, 2022 MLB draft)
- Spencer Jones (25th overall, New York Yankees, 2022 MLB draft)
- Enrique Bradfield (17th overall, Baltimore Orioles, 2023 MLB draft)

== Awards and honors ==
- 2007 CollegeBaseballInsider.com National Coach of the Year
- 2007 SEC Coach of the Year
- 2013 SEC Coach of the Year
- 2014 Baseball America College Coach of the Year
- 2014 Collegiate Baseball National Coach of the Year
- 2014 Perfect Game Coach of the Year
- 2019 SEC Coach of the Year

== See also ==
- List of current NCAA Division I baseball coaches
