= Tyler Colvin =

American baseball player (born 1985)

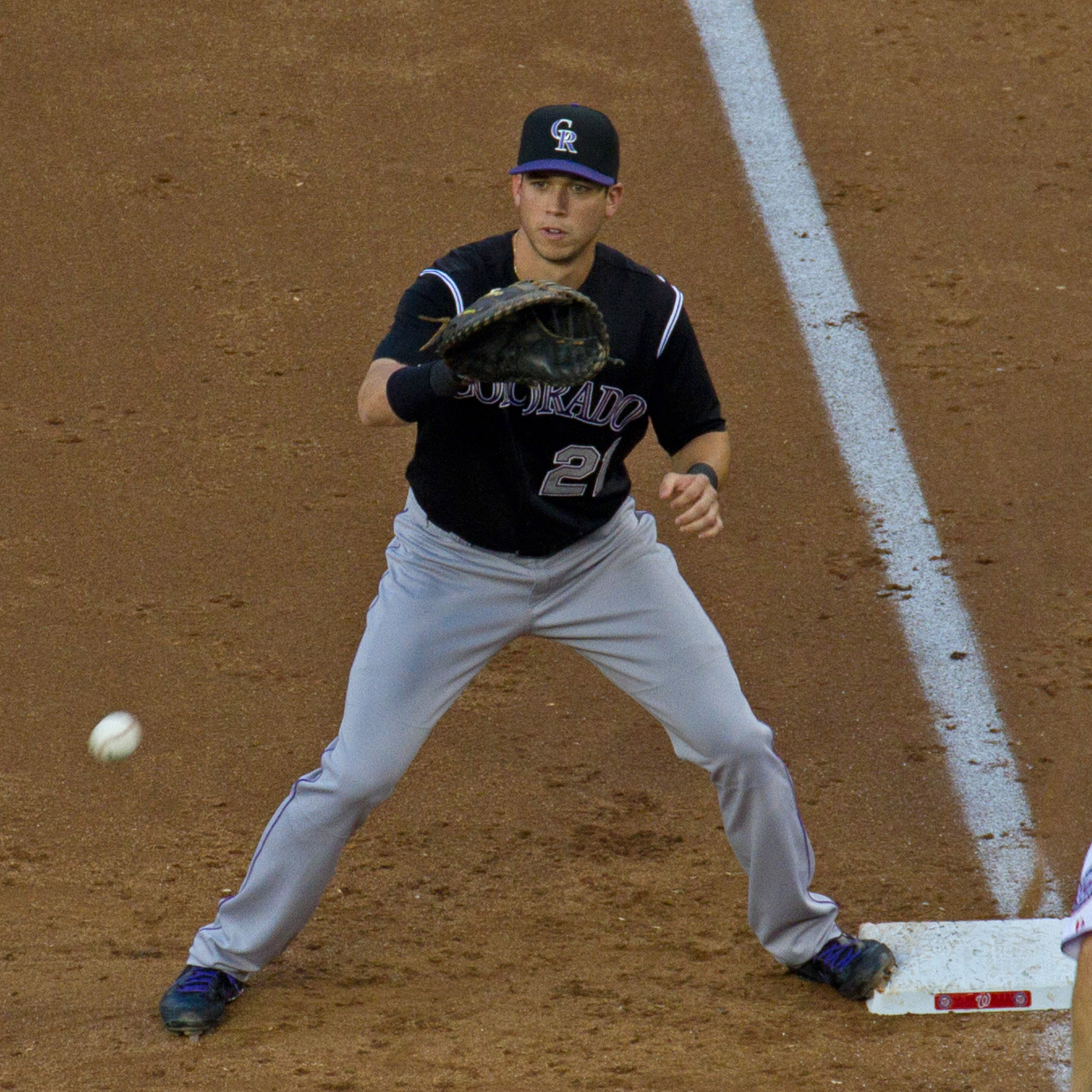
- Colvin with the Colorado Rockies in 2012
- Outfielder
- Born: September 5, 1985 (age 41); Augusta, Georgia, U.S.
- Batted: Left Threw: Left

MLB debut
- September 21, 2009, for the Chicago Cubs

Last MLB appearance
- July 30, 2014, for the San Francisco Giants

MLB statistics
- Batting average: .239
- Home runs: 49
- Runs batted in: 178
- Stats at Baseball Reference

Teams
- Chicago Cubs (2009–2011); Colorado Rockies (2012–2013); San Francisco Giants (2014)
Medals
Men's baseball
Representing United States
Baseball World Cup
Gold medal – first place	2007 Tianmu	National team

Tyler Eugene Colvin (born September 5, 1985) is an American former professional baseball outfielder. He played in Major League Baseball (MLB) for the Chicago Cubs, Colorado Rockies, and San Francisco Giants. Colvin played college baseball at Clemson University.

== Professional career ==
=== Chicago Cubs ===
Colvin was drafted by the Chicago Cubs 13th overall in the 2006 Major League Baseball draft.

He played in the Florida State League for the Class A-Advanced Daytona Cubs in 2007 and 2009.

Colvin was called up to the majors for the first time on September 21, 2009. He started the game and went 1-for-3 with a single and a sacrifice fly.

After a strong spring in 2010, Colvin made the Cubs Opening Day roster. On April 8, 2010, against the Atlanta Braves, Colvin hit his first major league home run. Three nights later Colvin hit his first triple of his major league career against the Washington Nationals. After compiling 20 home runs for the Cubs during the season, on September 19, 2010, in a game against the Florida Marlins, Colvin was hit in the chest with a shard from a broken bat when scoring on a double by Welington Castillo. The piece of bat punctured Colvin's lung. Colvin was brought to the hospital and remained in stable condition. He missed the remainder of the 2010 season due to the incident.

=== Colorado Rockies ===
On December 8, 2011, Colvin was traded along with DJ LeMahieu to the Colorado Rockies for Casey Weathers and Ian Stewart. On July 6, 2012, he became the first player to hit two home runs in the same game against pitcher Stephen Strasburg during a 5-1 win over the Washington Nationals. Colvin hit 18 home runs for the Rockies in 2012.

Colvin was outrighted off the Rockies' roster on September 4, 2013, becoming a free agent on October 1.

=== San Francisco Giants ===
In 2014, Colvin was expected to sign with the Orioles, but due to back issues, the deal fell through. Instead, Colvin signed a minor-league deal with the San Francisco Giants on February 22, 2014. On May 12, 2014, Colvin was called up and made his Giants home debut by hitting a home run and a two-run triple in his third game of the season. The home run was also splash hit number 65 at AT&T Park. The Giants went on to beat the Atlanta Braves 4–2. However, after hitting only .223 in 139 at-bats, he was designated for assignment on August 1. Colvin elected free agency in October 2014.

=== Miami Marlins ===
On January 5, 2015, Colvin signed with the Miami Marlins organization on a minor league contract. He was released by the Marlins on April 3.

=== Chicago White Sox ===
On May 3, 2015, Colvin signed a contract with the Chicago White Sox organization. In 88 appearances for the Triple-A Charlotte Knights, he batted .226/.264/.334 with four home runs and 25 RBI. Colvin elected free agency following the season on November 6.

=== Long Island Ducks ===
On May 14, 2016, Colvin signed with the Long Island Ducks of the Atlantic League of Professional Baseball. In 72 appearances for the Ducks, he slashed .218/.264/.339 with five home runs and 28 RBI. Colvin became a free agent after the season.

=== Los Angeles Dodgers ===
Colvin signed a minor league contract with the Los Angeles Dodgers on February 19, 2018. He played in 15 games for the Double-A Tulsa Drillers, hitting .286/.340/.405 with one home run and five RBI. Colvin was released by the Dodgers organization on June 24.
