= Brandon Waddell =

American baseball player (born 1994)

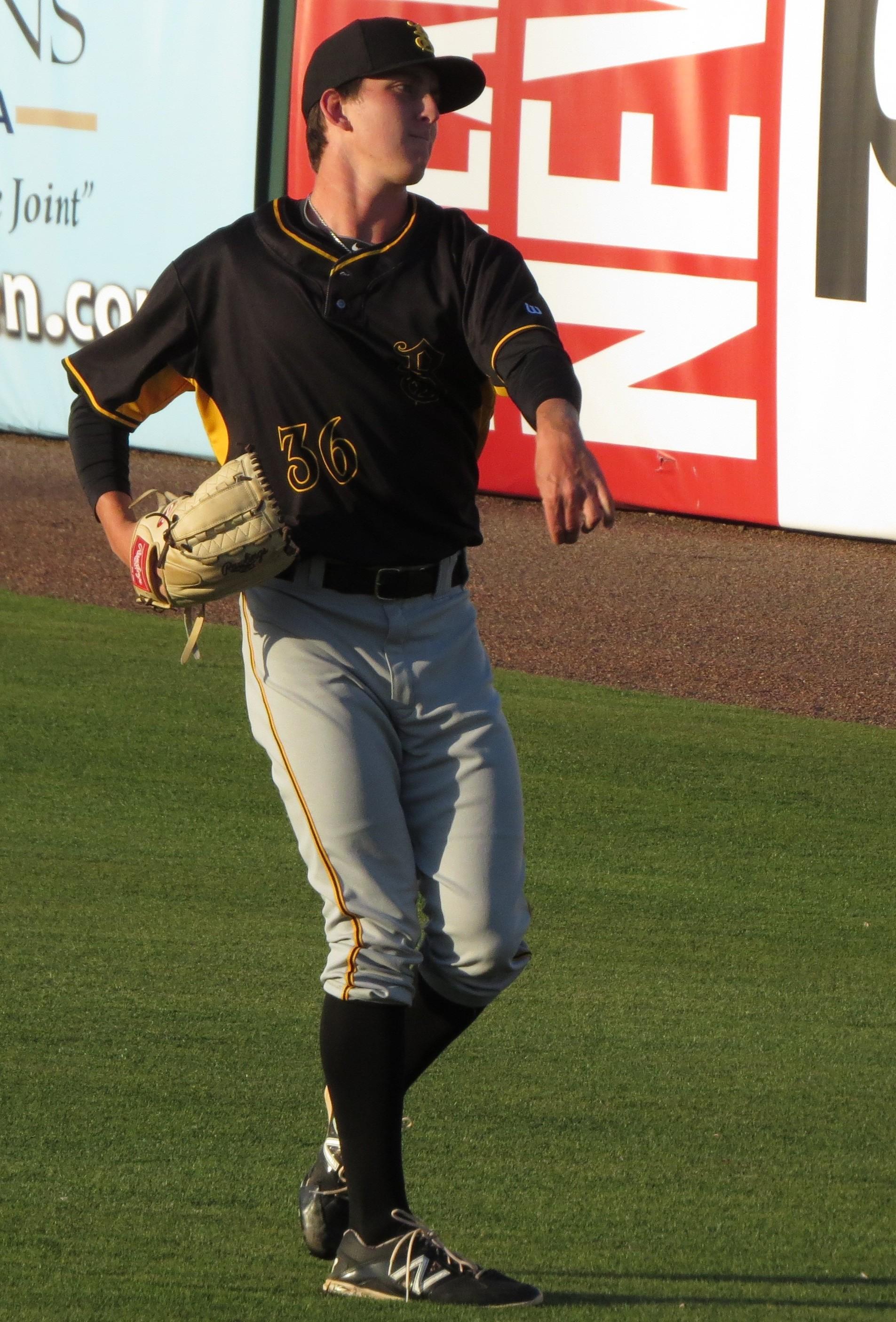
- Waddell with the Bradenton Marauders in 2016

Free agent
- Pitcher
- Born: June 3, 1994 (age 32); Houston, Texas, U.S.
- Bats: Left Throws: Left

Professional debut
- MLB: August 14, 2020, for the Pittsburgh Pirates
- KBO: August 5, 2022, for the Doosan Bears
- CPBL: April 1, 2023, for the Rakuten Monkeys

MLB statistics (through 2025 season)
- Win–loss record: 0–1
- Earned run average: 4.09
- Strikeouts: 31

KBO statistics (through 2024 season)
- Win–loss record: 23–10
- Earned run average: 2.98
- Strikeouts: 215

CPBL statistics (through 2023 season)
- Win–loss record: 5–5
- Earned run average: 3.30
- Strikeouts: 60
- Stats at Baseball Reference

Teams
- Pittsburgh Pirates (2020); Minnesota Twins (2021); Baltimore Orioles (2021); St. Louis Cardinals (2021); Doosan Bears (2022); Rakuten Monkeys (2023); Doosan Bears (2023–2024); New York Mets (2025)

Brandon David Waddell (born June 3, 1994) is an American professional baseball pitcher who is a free agent. He has previously played in Major League Baseball (MLB) for the Pittsburgh Pirates, Minnesota Twins, Baltimore Orioles, St. Louis Cardinals, and New York Mets, in the KBO League for the Doosan Bears, and in the Chinese Professional Baseball League (CPBL) for the Rakuten Monkeys. He made his MLB debut in 2020.

== Career ==
=== Amateur career ===
Waddell attended Clear Lake High School in Houston, Texas, and took college level courses at the University of Houston–Clear Lake. He enrolled at the University of Virginia to play college baseball for the Virginia Cavaliers baseball team. Virginia reached the final round in the 2014 College World Series, and he started the must win game two, which Virginia won, but then went on to lose game three. With his extra credits, Waddell graduated from the University of Virginia in three years with a degree in economics, and has been admitted to the masters program in the School of Education and Human Development (formerly the Curry School of Education) at Virginia. He pitched in the deciding game of the 2015 College World Series, earning the win.

=== Pittsburgh Pirates ===
The Pittsburgh Pirates selected Waddell in the fifth round of the 2015 MLB draft. He signed with the Pirates, receiving a $315,000 signing bonus. Waddell made his professional debut with the West Virginia Black Bears of the Low–A New York-Penn League, where he spent the whole season, going 1–1 with a 5.75 ERA in six games. He began the 2016 season with the Bradenton Marauders of the High–A Florida State League, and was promoted to the Altoona Curve of the Double–A Eastern League in May. He pitched to a combined 11–9 record with a 3.49 ERA between both teams. Waddell spent 2017 with Altoona where he posted a 3–3 record with a 3.55 ERA in 15 games. He split the 2018 and 2019 seasons between Altoona and the Indianapolis Indians of the Triple–A International League.

On August 9, 2020, Waddell had his contract selected to the 40-man roster. He made his major league debut on August 14 against the Cincinnati Reds.

=== Minnesota Twins ===
On October 30, 2020, the Minnesota Twins claimed Waddell off of waivers. On February 11, 2021, Waddell was designated for assignment following the waiver claim of Kyle Garlick. On February 13, Waddell was outrighted and invited to spring training as a non-roster invitee. On April 7, 2021, Waddell was selected to the 40-man and active rosters. After recording an 11.25 ERA in 4 appearances, Waddell was designated for assignment on May 7, 2021.

=== Baltimore Orioles ===
On May 8, 2021, Waddell was claimed off of waivers by the Baltimore Orioles. Waddell pitched 1.0 scoreless inning for Baltimore before being designated for assignment on June 4.

=== St. Louis Cardinals ===
On June 6, 2021, Waddell was claimed off waivers by the St. Louis Cardinals. Waddell made 4 appearances for the Cardinals in 2021, going 0-1 with a 6.75 ERA and 7 strikeouts. On April 4, 2022, Waddell was designated for assignment by the Cardinals. He was outrighted to the Triple-A Memphis Redbirds on April 7. He was released on July 13.

=== Doosan Bears ===
On July 17, 2022, Waddell signed with the Doosan Bears of the Korea Baseball Organization. He made 11 starts for Doosan down the stretch, logging a 5-3 record and 3.60 ERA with 40 strikeouts in 65 innings pitched.

=== Rakuten Monkeys ===
On January 14, 2023, Waddell signed with the Rakuten Monkeys of the Chinese Professional Baseball League. On April 1, Waddell started an Opening Day victory for the Monkeys in his CPBL debut. In 12 starts for Rakuten, he registered a 5–5 record and 3.30 ERA with 60 strikeouts in 71.0 innings pitched.

=== Doosan Bears (second stint) ===
On June 12, 2023, the Monkeys completed a contract transfer with the Doosan Bears of the KBO League, with Waddell set to report to Doosan on June 16 after one final start with the Monkeys. In 18 starts for Doosan, he registered an 11–3 record and 2.49 ERA with 100 strikeouts across 104 2/3 innings of work.

On December 21, 2023, Waddell re–signed with the Bears on a one–year, $1 million contract. In 2024, he posted a 7–4 record with a 3.12 ERA and 75 strikeouts across 75 innings pitched. Waddell became a free agent following the season.

=== New York Mets ===
On December 16, 2024, Waddell signed a minor league contract with the New York Mets. He began the 2025 season with the Triple-A Syracuse Mets, posting a 1-1 record and 1.54 ERA with 21 strikeouts over his first five starts. On April 30, 2025, the Mets selected Waddell's contract, adding him to their active roster. In 11 appearances for New York, he recorded a 3.45 ERA with 22 strikeouts across 31 1/3 innings pitched. Waddell was designated for assignment by the Mets following the acquisition of Drew Romo on December 17. On December 19, he cleared waivers and was sent outright to Triple-A Syracuse.

Waddell made four appearances (two starts) for Syracuse in 2026, logging a 2–0 record and 7.15 ERA with 10 strikeouts across 11 1/3 innings pitched. He was released by the Mets organization on August 3.
