= Karl Kuhn (baseball) =

American baseball player and coach

Current position
- Title: Head coach
- Team: Charleston Southern
- Conference: Big South
- Record: 61–45

Biographical details
- Born: 1969 (age 56–57); Gainesville, Florida, U.S.

Playing career
- 1987–1989: Valencia Community College
- 1990: Florida
- Position: Catcher

Coaching career (HC unless noted)
- 1991–1992: Buchholz H. S. (P)
- 1993: Valencia (P)
- 1994–1996: Charleston Southern (P)
- 1997–2003: Little Rock (P)
- 2004–2019: Virginia (P)
- 2020–2022: Radford
- 2023–2024: Charleston Southern (P)
- 2025–present: Charleston Southern

Head coaching record
- Overall: 101–109
- Tournaments: NCAA: 0–0

Karl Kuhn (born 1969) is an American college baseball coach and former catcher, who is the current head coach for the Charleston Southern Buccaneers, having been promoted to the position in June 2024 after serving as the pitching coach the last 2 seasons. Kuhn played college baseball at Valencia Community College from 1987 to 1989 and at the University of Florida in 1990 for head coach Joe Arnold. He then served as the head coach of the Radford Highlanders (2020–2022).

== Playing career ==
Kuhn attended Buchholz High School in Gainesville, Florida. He then enrolled at Valencia Community College, to play college baseball for the Matadors. After three years at Valencia, Kuhn played his final college season playing at the University of Florida.

== Coaching career ==
On August 22, 2019, Kuhn was named the head baseball coach at Radford University. On June 3, 2022, Kuhn resigned as the head coach of the Highlanders amidst an investigation by the university's human resources department.

== Head coaching record ==
Record table
Season	Team	Overall	Conference	Standing	Postseason
Radford Highlanders (Big South Conference) (2020–2022)
2020	Radford	9–8	0–0		Season canceled due to COVID-19
2021	Radford	23–23	17–19	5th	
2022	Radford	15–33	8–15	10th	
Radford:		47–64	25–34		
Charleston Southern Buccaneers (Big South Conference) (2025–present)
2025	Charleston Southern	31–22	14–10	3rd	Big South Tournament
2026	Charleston Southern	30–23	13–11	T–3rd	Big South Tournament
Charleston Southern:		61–45	27–21		
Total:		108–109			
National champion Postseason invitational champion Conference regular season champion Conference regular season and conference tournament champion Division regular season champion Division regular season and conference tournament champion Conference tournament champion

== See also ==
- List of current NCAA Division I baseball coaches
