= Daniel Pinero =

Canadian baseball player (born 1994)

- Shortstop / Third baseman
- Born: May 2, 1994 (age 31); Toronto, Ontario, Canada
- Bats: Right Throws: Right
- Stats at Baseball Reference
Medals
Men's baseball
Representing Canada
18U Baseball World Championship
Silver medal – second place	2012 Seoul	Team

Daniel Pinero (born May 2, 1994) is a Canadian former professional baseball shortstop. He was drafted by the Detroit Tigers in the 9th round of the 2016 Major League Baseball draft, for whom he spent 6 years in the minor leagues.

== Career ==
Pinero attended the Humberside Collegiate Institute in Toronto, Ontario. The Houston Astros selected Pinero in the 20th round of the 2013 MLB draft, but he did not sign with the team. He enrolled at the University of Virginia, where he played college baseball for the Virginia Cavaliers. In 2015, he played collegiate summer baseball with the Orleans Firebirds of the Cape Cod Baseball League.

=== Detroit Tigers ===
The Detroit Tigers selected Pinero in the ninth round of the 2016 MLB draft. He signed with the Tigers, and made his professional debut with the GCL Tigers. After slashing .333/.448/.667 with two home runs and six RBIs in seven games, he was promoted to the Low-A Connecticut Tigers and he finished the season there, batting .261 with 16 RBIs in 43 games. In 2017, he played for the Single-A West Michigan Whitecaps where he batted .289 with four home runs and 56 RBIs in 120 games. In 2018, Pinero spent the year with the High-A Lakeland Flying Tigers, slashing .263/.352/.396 with 9 home runs and 59 RBI.

Pinero split the 2019 season between the Double-A Erie SeaWolves and the Triple-A Toledo Mud Hens, posting a slash of .235/.328/.417 with 15 home runs and 52 RBI in 116 games between the two teams. Pinero did not play in a game in 2020 due to the cancellation of the minor league season because of the COVID-19 pandemic. In 2021, Pinero only made 15 total appearances, all with Toledo and Lakeland, and hit .216/.375/.405 with 1 home run and 7 RBI. On March 25, 2022, Pinero was released by the Tigers organization.

=== Gastonia Honey Hunters ===
On August 29, 2022, Pinero signed with the Gastonia Honey Hunters of the Atlantic League of Professional Baseball. He became a free agent following the season.

In March 2023, Pinero became a sales associate at Franklin Street Commercial Real Estate.

== International career ==
Pinero played for the Canadian national baseball team in the 2017 World Baseball Classic and 2019 Pan American Games Qualifier.

== Personal life ==
Pinero's father, Reinaldo, played baseball for the Cuban national baseball team.
