= Philip Pfeifer =

American baseball player (born 1992)

- Pitcher / Coach
- Born: July 15, 1992 (age 33); Knoxville, Tennessee, U.S.
- Bats: Left Throws: Left
- Stats at Baseball Reference

Philip James Pfeifer (born July 15, 1992) is an American former professional baseball pitcher who currently serves as the pitching coach for Allen Community College. He played college baseball for the Vanderbilt Commodores.

== Amateur career ==
Pfeifer graduated from Farragut High School in Farragut, Tennessee. He played for the school's baseball team, and set a few state records, one by recording 46 wins. He enrolled at Vanderbilt University to play college baseball for the Vanderbilt Commodores baseball team. In 2012, he played collegiate summer baseball with the Orleans Firebirds of the Cape Cod Baseball League. Pfeifer was suspended for the 2014 season due to substance abuse issues, but returned to the team in 2015, and became captain.

== Professional career ==
=== Los Angeles Dodgers ===
The Los Angeles Dodgers selected Pfeifer in the third round, with the 101st overall selection, of the 2015 MLB draft. The Dodgers signed Pfeifer and assigned him to the Ogden Raptors where he pitched 1 2/3 scoreless innings for the season. He ended 2015 early due to bone spurs in his pitching elbow. Pfeifer began 2016 with the Great Lakes Loons and was later promoted to the Rancho Cucamonga Quakes.

=== Atlanta Braves ===
On June 30, 2016, the Dodgers traded Pfeifer and Caleb Dirks to the Atlanta Braves for Bud Norris, Dian Toscano, a player to be named later (Alec Grosser), and cash. The Braves assigned Pfeifer to the Carolina Mudcats and he was promoted to the Mississippi Braves in July. In 34 combined games between Great Lakes, Rancho Cucamonga, Carolina and Mississippi, Pfeifer posted a 4–1 record and 3.02 ERA with sixty strikeouts in 47 2/3 total innings. In 2017, he played for both Mississippi and the Gwinnett Braves, pitching to a combined 1–5 record and 3.49 ERA in 41 total games between both clubs, and in 2018, he returned to pitch for both Mississippi and Gwinnett, going 2–3 with a 5.73 ERA in 39 games. He returned to Mississippi to begin 2019 before being promoted to the Gwinnett Stripers. Over thirty games (18 starts) between both clubs, Pfeifer went 6–8 with a 2.97 ERA, striking out 159 over 133 1/3 innings.

Pfeifer was added to the Braves 40–man roster following the 2019 season. Following his father's death on July 1, 2018, Pfeifer planned to retire from professional baseball and enroll in law school after the 2019 season ended. Instead, Pfeifer continued pitching in the Australian Baseball League, was added to the Braves 40–man roster, and participated in spring training at the major league level. He was placed on 26-man roster for the 2020 season, but did not pitch in a game due to a fractured elbow.

On February 23, 2021, Pfeifer was designated for assignment by Atlanta after the signing of Jake Lamb was made official. On February 26, Pfeifer was outrighted to the Triple-A Gwinnett Braves. On March 14, Pfeifer was released.

=== San Francisco Giants ===
On March 20, 2021, Pfeifer signed a minor league contract with the San Francisco Giants organization that included an invitation to MLB Spring Training. He pitched to a 7.13 ERA over 35 1/3 innings split between the Triple-A Sacramento River Cats and Double-A Richmond Flying Squirrels, making 4 starts and 10 appearances in relief. He tore his UCL and required full reconstruction in July. Pfeifer elected free agency at the end of the season on November 7.

=== Canberra Cavalry ===
On November 12, 2022, Pfeifer signed with the Canberra Cavalry of the Australian Baseball League, having played for them in the 2019-2020 season as well.

== Coaching career ==
On September 12, 2025, Pfeifer was hired to serve as the pitching coach for Allen Community College.
