= 2015 Southeastern Conference baseball tournament =

- Teams: 12
- Format: See below
- Finals site: Hoover Metropolitan Stadium; Hoover, AL
- Champions: Florida (7th title)
- Winning coach: Kevin O'Sullivan (2nd title)
- MVP: J. J. Schwarz (Florida)
- Attendance: 132,178
- Television: ESPN2 (championship game)

2015 Southeastern Conference baseball standings
| | Conf. | | | | Overall |
| Team | W | | L | PCT | W | | L | PCT |
|---|---|---|---|---|---|---|---|---|
Eastern
| No. 2 Vanderbilt ^{x}‍‍‍^{y} | 20 | – | 10 | .667 | 51 | – | 21 | .708 |
| No. 3 Florida ‍‍‡‍^{y} | 19 | – | 11 | .633 | 52 | – | 18 | .743 |
| Missouri ‍‍‍ | 15 | – | 15 | .500 | 30 | – | 28 | .517 |
| Kentucky ‍‍‍ | 14 | – | 15 | .483 | 30 | – | 25 | .545 |
| South Carolina ‍‍‍ | 13 | – | 17 | .433 | 32 | – | 25 | .561 |
| Tennessee ‍‍‍ | 11 | – | 18 | .379 | 24 | – | 26 | .480 |
| Georgia ‍‍‍ | 10 | – | 19 | .345 | 26 | – | 28 | .481 |
Western
| No. 5 LSU ^{x}‍†‍‍^{y} | 21 | – | 8 | .724 | 54 | – | 12 | .818 |
| No. 11 Texas A&M ‍‍‍^{y} | 18 | – | 10 | .643 | 50 | – | 14 | .781 |
| No. 7 Arkansas ‍‍‍^{y} | 17 | – | 12 | .586 | 40 | – | 25 | .615 |
| Ole Miss ‍‍‍^{y} | 15 | – | 14 | .517 | 30 | – | 28 | .517 |
| Auburn ‍‍‍^{y} | 13 | – | 17 | .433 | 36 | – | 26 | .581 |
| Alabama ‍‍‍ | 12 | – | 18 | .400 | 32 | – | 28 | .533 |
| Mississippi State ‍‍‍ | 8 | – | 22 | .267 | 24 | – | 30 | .444 |
x – Division champion † – Conference champion ‡ – Tournament champion y – Invited to the NCAA tournament Rankings from Collegiate Baseball

The 2015 Southeastern Conference baseball tournament was held from May 19 through 24 at Hoover Metropolitan Stadium in Hoover, Alabama. The annual tournament determined the tournament champion of the Division I Southeastern Conference in college baseball. Florida, the tournament champion, earned the conference's automatic bid to the 2015 NCAA Division I baseball tournament.

The tournament has been held every year since 1977, with LSU claiming eleven championships, the most of any school. Original members Georgia and Kentucky along with 1993 addition Arkansas have never won the tournament. This is the eighteenth consecutive year and twentieth overall that the event has been held at Hoover Metropolitan Stadium.

== Format and seeding ==
The regular season division winners, LSU and Vanderbilt, claimed the top two seeds respectively and the next ten teams by conference winning percentage, regardless of division, will claim the remaining berths in the tournament. The bottom eight teams played a single-elimination opening round, followed by a double-elimination format until the semifinals, when the format reverted to single elimination through the championship game. This was the third year of this format. Auburn was seeded ninth ahead of South Carolina due to the tiebreaker they obtained by winning a regular season series against the Gamecocks in Columbia.

| Team | W–L | Pct | GB #1 | Seed |
|---|---|---|---|---|
Eastern Division
| Vanderbilt | 20–10 | .667 | 1.5 | 2 |
| Florida | 19–11 | .633 | 2.5 | 4 |
| Missouri | 15–15 | .500 | 6.5 | 7 |
| Kentucky | 14–15 | .483 | 7 | 8 |
| South Carolina | 13–17 | .433 | 8.5 | 10 |
| Tennessee | 11–18 | .379 | 10 | 12 |
| Georgia | 10–19 | .345 | 11 | – |

| Team | W–L | Pct | GB #1 | Seed |
|---|---|---|---|---|
Western Division
| LSU | 21–8 | .724 | – | 1 |
| Texas A&M | 18–10 | .643 | 2.5 | 3 |
| Arkansas | 17–12 | .586 | 4 | 5 |
| Ole Miss | 15–14 | .517 | 6 | 6 |
| Auburn | 13–17 | .433 | 8.5 | 9 |
| Alabama | 12–18 | .400 | 9.5 | 11 |
| Mississippi State | 8–22 | .267 | 13.5 | – |

== Bracket ==
First round SECN
6 | Ole Miss | 1
11 | Alabama | 6
7 | Missouri | 5
10 | South Carolina | 1
8 | Kentucky | 3
9 | Auburn | 6
5 | Arkansas | 2
12 | Tennessee | 1

Second round SECN
3 | Texas A&M | 4
11 | Alabama | 3
2 | Vanderbilt | 7
7 | Missouri | 6^{10}
11 | Alabama | 4
7 | Missouri | 3
1 | LSU | 9
9 | Auburn | 8
4 | Florida | 6
5 | Arkansas | 7
9 | Auburn | 2
4 | Florida | 11

Third round SECN
3 | Texas A&M | 6
2 | Vanderbilt | 1
11 | Alabama | 1
2 | Vanderbilt | 16^{7}
1 | LSU | 10
5 | Arkansas | 5
4 | Florida | 10
5 | Arkansas | 0^{7}

Semifinals; SECN
3 | Texas A&M | 3
2 | Vanderbilt | 12
1 | LSU | 1
4 | Florida | 2

Final; ESPN2
2 | Vanderbilt | 3
4 | Florida | 7

== Schedule ==
| Game | Time* | Matchup^{#} | Television | Attendance |
Tuesday, May 19
| 1 | 9:30 a.m. | #6 Ole Miss vs. #11 Alabama | SEC Network | 4,817 |
| 2 | 1 p.m. | #7 Missouri vs. #10 South Carolina | SEC Network | 4,817 |
| 3 | 4:30 p.m. | #8 Kentucky vs. #9 Auburn | SEC Network | 5,761 |
| 4 | 8 p.m. | #5 Arkansas vs. #12 Tennessee | SEC Network | 5,761 |
Wednesday, May 20
| 5 | 9:30 a.m. | #3 Texas A&M vs. #11 Alabama | SEC Network | 5,205 |
| 6 | 1 p.m. | #2 Vanderbilt vs. #7 Missouri | SEC Network | 5,205 |
| 7 | 4:30 p.m. | #1 LSU vs. #9 Auburn | SEC Network | 10,142 |
| 8 | 8 p.m. | #4 Florida vs. #5 Arkansas | SEC Network | 10,142 |
Thursday, May 21
| 9 | 9:30 a.m. | #11 Alabama vs. #7 Missouri | SEC Network | 6,526 |
| 10 | 1 p.m. | #9 Auburn vs. #4 Florida | SEC Network | 6,526 |
| 11 | 4:30 p.m. | #3 Texas A&M vs. #2 Vanderbilt | SEC Network | 8,361 |
| 12 | 8 p.m. | #1 LSU vs. #5 Arkansas | SEC Network | 8,361 |
Friday, May 22
| 13 | 3 p.m. | #11 Alabama vs. #2 Vanderbilt | SEC Network | 10,329 |
| 14 | 6:30 p.m. | #4 Florida vs. #5 Arkansas | SEC Network | 10,329 |
Semifinals – Saturday, May 23
| 15 | Noon | #2 Vanderbilt vs. #3 Texas A&M | SEC Network | 10,949 |
| 16 | 3:30 p.m. | #4 Florida vs. #1 LSU | SEC Network | 10,949 |
Championship – Sunday, May 24
| 17 | 3:30 p.m. | #2 Vanderbilt vs. #4 Florida | ESPN2 | 10,590 |
*Game times in CDT. # – Rankings denote tournament seed.

== All-Tournament Team ==
The following players were named to the All-Tournament Team.

| Pos. | Player | School |
|---|---|---|
| SP | A. J. Puk | Florida |
| SP | Matt Kent | Texas A&M |
| RP | Taylor Lewis | Florida |
| C/DH | J. J. Schwarz | Florida |
| 1B | Zander Wiel | Vanderbilt |
| 1B | Pete Alonso | Florida |
| 2B | Jared Foster | LSU |
| 3B | Will Toffey | Vanderbilt |
| SS | Dansby Swanson | Vanderbilt |
| OF | Jeren Kendall | Vanderbilt |
| OF | Bryan Reynolds | Vanderbilt |
| OF | Trey Harris | Missouri |
| OF | Buddy Reed | Florida |

Bold is MVP.
