= 2015 Florida Gators baseball team =

American college baseball season

2015 Florida Gators baseball

SEC tournament champions Gainesville Regional champions Gainesville Super Regional champions

College World Series, 3–2
- Conference: Southeastern Conference

Ranking
- Coaches: No. 3
- CB: No. 3
- Record: 52–18 (19–11 SEC)
- Head coach: Kevin O'Sullivan (8th year)
- Assistant coach: Craig Bell (8th year); Brad Weitzel (8th year)
- Home stadium: Alfred A. McKethan Stadium

2015 Southeastern Conference baseball standings
	Conf.				Overall
Team	W		L	PCT	W		L	PCT
Eastern
No. 2 Vanderbilt ^{x}‍‍‍^{y}	20	–	10	.667	51	–	21	.708
No. 3 Florida ‍‍‡‍^{y}	19	–	11	.633	52	–	18	.743
Missouri ‍‍‍	15	–	15	.500	30	–	28	.517
Kentucky ‍‍‍	14	–	15	.483	30	–	25	.545
South Carolina ‍‍‍	13	–	17	.433	32	–	25	.561
Tennessee ‍‍‍	11	–	18	.379	24	–	26	.480
Georgia ‍‍‍	10	–	19	.345	26	–	28	.481
Western
No. 5 LSU ^{x}‍†‍‍^{y}	21	–	8	.724	54	–	12	.818
No. 11 Texas A&M ‍‍‍^{y}	18	–	10	.643	50	–	14	.781
No. 7 Arkansas ‍‍‍^{y}	17	–	12	.586	40	–	25	.615
Ole Miss ‍‍‍^{y}	15	–	14	.517	30	–	28	.517
Auburn ‍‍‍^{y}	13	–	17	.433	36	–	26	.581
Alabama ‍‍‍	12	–	18	.400	32	–	28	.533
Mississippi State ‍‍‍	8	–	22	.267	24	–	30	.444
x – Division champion † – Conference champion ‡ – Tournament champion y – Invited to the NCAA tournament Rankings from Collegiate Baseball

The 2015 Florida Gators baseball team represented the University of Florida in the sport of baseball during the 2015 college baseball season. The Gators competed in the Eastern Division of the Southeastern Conference (SEC). They played their home games at Alfred A. McKethan Stadium on the university's Gainesville, Florida campus. The team was coached by Kevin O'Sullivan in his eighth season as Florida head coach. The Gators entered the season hoping to build upon their performance in the 2014 NCAA tournament, where they were eliminated after consecutive losses to the College of Charleston and North Carolina.

== Roster ==
=== By player ===
2015 Florida Gators baseball team
Players
Coaches

#	Pos.	Name	B/T	Height	Weight	Year	Home town
20	INF	Pete Alonso	R/R	6 ft 2 in (1.88 m)	225 lb (102 kg)	So	Tampa, FL
37	RHP	Shaun Anderson	R/R	6 ft 4 in (1.93 m)	225 lb (102 kg)	So	Coral Springs, FL
8	OF	Harrison Bader	R/R	6 ft 0 in (1.83 m)	190 lb (86 kg)	Jr	Bronxville, NY
2	LHP	Logan Browning	L/L	5 ft 8 in (1.73 m)	180 lb (82 kg)	Fr	Lakeland, FL
26	LHP	Tyler Deel	L/L	6 ft 5 in (1.96 m)	190 lb (86 kg)	So	Jacksonville, FL
3	RHP	Dane Dunning	R/R	6 ft 3 in (1.91 m)	190 lb (86 kg)	So	Fleming Island, FL
21	RHP	Alex Faedo	R/R	6 ft 4 in (1.93 m)	220 lb (100 kg)	Fr	Tampa, FL
29	C	Mike Fahrman	R/R	6 ft 0 in (1.83 m)	205 lb (93 kg)	Jr	Tampa, FL
5	INF	Dalton Guthrie	R/R	5 ft 11 in (1.8 m)	170 lb (77 kg)	Fr	Sarasota, FL
25	RHP	Eric Hanhold	R/R	6 ft 5 in (1.96 m)	205 lb (93 kg)	Jr	Palm Harbor, FL
17	INF	Christian Hicks	S/R	6 ft 4 in (1.93 m)	200 lb (91 kg)	Fr	St. Augustine, FL
28	C	Mark Kolozsvary	R/R	5 ft 9 in (1.75 m)	190 lb (86 kg)	Fr	Tavares, FL
1	INF	Taylor Lane	R/R	6 ft 2 in (1.88 m)	200 lb (91 kg)	Fr	Chesapeake, VA
66	OF	Ryan Larson	R/R	6 ft 0 in (1.83 m)	185 lb (84 kg)	So	Orlando, FL
16	RHP	Taylor Lewis	R/R	6 ft 0 in (1.83 m)	170 lb (77 kg)	Jr	Claxton, GA
38	INF	Jason Lombardozzi	S/R	5 ft 11 in (1.8 m)	180 lb (82 kg)	Jr	Chambersburg, PA
12	INF	Richie Martin	R/R	6 ft 0 in (1.83 m)	185 lb (84 kg)	Jr	Brandon, FL
34	RHP	Brett Morales	R/R	6 ft 1 in (1.85 m)	195 lb (88 kg)	So	Tampa, FL
30	LHP	Scott Moss	L/L	6 ft 5 in (1.96 m)	215 lb (98 kg)	RS Fr	Deltona, FL
14	LHP	Bobby Poyner	L/L	6 ft 0 in (1.83 m)	205 lb (93 kg)	Sr	Wellington, FL
10	LHP	A. J. Puk	L/L	6 ft 7 in (2.01 m)	225 lb (102 kg)	So	Cedar Rapids, IA
23	OF	Buddy Reed	S/R	6 ft 3 in (1.91 m)	200 lb (91 kg)	So	Finksburg, MD
27	RHP	Aaron Rhodes	L/R	5 ft 11 in (1.8 m)	190 lb (86 kg)	Jr	Venice, FL
4	C	Mike Rivera	R/R	5 ft 10 in (1.78 m)	205 lb (93 kg)	Fr	Venice, FL
39	RHP	Frank Rubio	R/R	5 ft 11 in (1.8 m)	185 lb (84 kg)	So	Miami Shores, FL
22	C	J.J. Schwarz	R/R	6 ft 1 in (1.85 m)	205 lb (93 kg)	Fr	Palm Beach Gardens, FL
32	RHP	Logan Shore	R/R	6 ft 2 in (1.88 m)	215 lb (98 kg)	So	Coon Rapids, MN
13	LHP	Kirby Snead	L/L	6 ft 0 in (1.83 m)	190 lb (86 kg)	So	Alachua, FL
44	INF	John Sternagel	R/R	6 ft 1 in (1.85 m)	205 lb (93 kg)	So	Rockledge, FL
11	INF	Josh Tobias	S/R	5 ft 10 in (1.78 m)	205 lb (93 kg)	Sr	Greensboro, NC
24	OF	Jeremy Vasquez	L/L	5 ft 11 in (1.8 m)	205 lb (93 kg)	Fr	Palm City, FL
18	RHP	Mike Vinson	R/R	6 ft 4 in (1.93 m)	215 lb (98 kg)	RS So	Miami, FL
15	LHP	Danny Young	L/L	6 ft 2 in (1.88 m)	200 lb (91 kg)	Jr	Boca Raton, FL

Head coach

7 Kevin O'Sullivan

Assistant coach(es)

33 Craig Bell
42 Brad Weitzel

Legend

- (C) Team captain
- (S) Suspended
- (I) Ineligible
- Injured
- Current redshirt

Roster

=== By position ===
2015 Florida Gators roster
Pitchers: 2 – Logan Browning – Freshman; 3 – Dane Dunning – Sophomore; 10 – A. J. Puk – Sophomore; 13 – Kirby Snead – Sophomore; 14 – Bobby Poyner – Senior; 15 – Danny Young – Junior; 16 – Taylor Lewis – Junior; 18 – Mike Vinson – (redshirt) Sophomore; 21 – Alex Faedo – Freshman; 25 – Eric Hanhold – Junior; 26 – Tyler Deel – Sophomore; 27 – Aaron Rhodes – Junior; 30 – Scott Moss – (redshirt) Freshman; 32 – Logan Shore – Sophomore; 34 – Brett Morales – Sophomore; 37 – Shaun Anderson – Sophomore; 39 – Frank Rubio – Sophomore	Catchers: 4 – Mike Rivera – Freshman; 22 – J. J. Schwarz – Freshman; 28 – Mark Kolozsvary – Freshman; 29 – Mike Fahrman – Junior; Infielders: 1 – Taylor Lane – Freshman; 5 – Dalton Guthrie – Freshman; 10 – A. J. Puk – Sophomore; 11 – Josh Tobias – Senior; 12 – Richie Martin – Junior; 17 – Christian Hicks – Freshman; 20 – Pete Alonso – Sophomore; 24 – Jeremy Vasquez – Freshman; 38 – Jason Lombardozzi – Junior; 44 – John Sternagel – Sophomore	Outfielders: 2 – Logan Browning – Freshman; 8 – Harrison Bader – Junior; 23 – Buddy Reed – Sophomore; 24 – Jeremy Vasquez – Freshman; 26 – Logan Deel – Sophomore; 66 – Ryan Larson – Sophomore

== Coaching staff ==
Coaching Staff
- 7 – Kevin O'Sullivan – Head coach – 8th year
- 33 – Craig Bell – Assistant coach – 8th year
- 42 – Brad Weitzel – Assistant coach – 8th year
- 31 – Buddy Munroe – Volunteer assistant coach – 1st year
- Jon Michelini – Athletic trainer – 2nd year
- Paul Chandler – Strength & conditioning coordinator – 6th year

== Schedule ==
Legend
	Florida win
	Florida loss
	Postponement
**Bold**	Florida team member

2015 Florida Gators baseball game log
Regular season
February

Date	Opponent	Rank	Stadium Site	Score	Win	Loss	Save	Attendance	Overall Record	SEC Record
February 13	Rhode Island	No. 5	McKethan Stadium	9–1	**Shore** (1–0)	Moyers (0–1)	None	3,404	1–0	–
February 14	Rhode Island	No. 5	McKethan Stadium	22–3	**Dunning** (1–0)	Distasio (0–1)	None	3,283	2–0	–
February 15	Rhode Island	No. 5	McKethan Stadium	6–1	**Puk** (1–0)	Whitman (0–1)	None	3,210	3–0	–
February 17	Florida A&M	No. 5	McKethan Stadium	Canceled (rain)						
February 18	at South Florida	No. 5	USF Baseball Stadium; Tampa, FL	13–3	**Morales** (1–0)	Peterson (0–1)	None	2,059	4–0	–
February 20	No. 14 Miami (FL); Rivalry	No. 5	McKethan Stadium	4–3	**Lewis** (1–0)	Mediaville (0–1)	None	3,661	5–0	–
February 21	No. 14 Miami (FL); Rivalry	No. 5	McKethan Stadium	2–7	Woodrey (2–0)	**Puk** (1–1)	None	6,081	5–1	–
February 22	No. 14 Miami (FL); Rivalry	No. 5	McKethan Stadium	2–1	**Dunning** (2–0)	Sosa (1–1)	**Lewis** (1)	4,734	6–1	–
February 24	at Florida Atlantic	No. 5	Roger Dean Stadium; Jupiter, FL	10–8	**Vinson** (1–0)	Carr (0–1)	**Lewis** (2)	2,181	7–1	–
February 27	Stony Brook	No. 5	McKethan Stadium	1–0	**Shore** (2–0)	Knesnik (0–2)	**Poyner** (1)	2,602	8–1	–
February 28	Stony Brook	No. 5	McKethan Stadium	14–3	**Puk** (2–1)	Honahan (1–1)	None	2,721	9–1	–

March

Date	Opponent	Rank	Stadium Site	Score	Win	Loss	Save	Attendance	Overall Record	SEC Record
March 1	Stony Brook	No. 5	McKethan Stadium	6–2	**Dunning** (3–0)	Zamora (1–1)	**Lewis** (3)	3,222	10–1	–
March 3	at No. 14 UCF	No. 2	Jay Bergman Field; Orlando, FL	3–4	Hukari (3–0)	**Poyner** (0–1)	Thompson (2)	4,319	10–2	–
March 4	No. 14 UCF	No. 2	McKethan Stadium	10–2	**Snead** (1–0)	Hepple (1–1)	None	2,705	11–2	–
March 6	Maine	No. 2	McKethan Stadium	5–0	**Shore** (3–0)	Courtney (0–4)	None	2,803	12–2	–
March 7	Maine	No. 2	McKethan Stadium	6–1	**Puk** (3–1)	Heath (2–1)	**Young** (1)	3,153	13–2	–
March 8	Maine	No. 2	McKethan Stadium	5–3	**Dunning** (4–0)	Marks (0–3)	**Lewis** (4)	3,147	14–2	–
March 10	Fairfield	No. 3	McKethan Stadium	8–7	**Hanhold** (1–0)	Wallace (0–1)	**Lewis** (5)	2,458	15–2	–
March 11	Fairfield	No. 3	McKethan Stadium	6–1	**Faedo** (1–0)	Howell (0–2)	None	2,435	16–2	–
March 13	Tennessee	No. 3	McKethan Stadium	3–6	Marks (2–1)	**Shore** (3–1)	Lee (3)	3,516	16–3	0–1
March 14	Tennessee	No. 3	McKethan Stadium	8–3	**Puk** (4–1)	Owenby (1–2)	**Poyner** (2)	3,918	17–3	1–1
March 15	Tennessee	No. 3	McKethan Stadium	9–4	**Young** (1–0)	Serrano (1–2)	None	3,648	18–3	2–1
March 17	No. 11 Florida State; Rivalry	No. 3	McKethan Stadium	14–8	**Vinson** (2–0)	Carlton (1–1)	None	5,827	19–3	–
March 20	at Ole Miss	No. 3	Swayze Field; Oxford, MS	1–4	Trent (4–1)	**Shore** (3–2)	Weathersby (2)	9,065	19–4	2–2
March 21 (1)	at Ole Miss	No. 3	Swayze Field	2–5	Bramlett (3–1)	**Puk** (4–2)	Short (2)	9,761	19–5	2–3
March 21 (2)	at Ole Miss	No. 3	Swayze Field	8–4	**Poyner** (1–1)	Stokes (0–1)	None	9,761	20–5	3–3
March 24	at Stetson	No. 5	Melching Field; DeLand, FL	9–6	**Browning** (1–0)	Warmoth (0–1)	**Lewis** (6)	2,016	21–5	–
March 26	Alabama	No. 5	McKethan Stadium	Postponed (rain); Makeup: March 27						
March 27 (1)	Alabama	No. 5	McKethan Stadium	9–12^{10}	Castillo (3–0)	**Lewis** (1–1)	None	3,123	21–6	3–4
March 27 (2)	Alabama	No. 5	McKethan Stadium	8–1	**Shore** (4–2)	Carter (1–3)	None	3,123	22–6	4–4
March 28	Alabama	No. 5	McKethan Stadium	7–4	**Puk** (5–2)	Hubbard (2–2)	None	4,367	23–6	5–4
March 31	vs. No. 8 Florida State; Rivalry	No. 5	Baseball Grounds; Jacksonville, FL	3–8	Holtmann (4–1)	**Faedo** (1–1)	Silva (1)	8,306	23–7	–

April

Date	Opponent	Rank	Stadium Site	Score	Win	Loss	Save	Attendance	Overall Record	SEC Record
April 3	at Missouri	No. 5	Taylor Stadium; Columbia, MO	5–1	**Shore** (5–2)	McClain (4–3)	None	714	24–7	6–4
April 4	at Missouri	No. 5	Taylor Stadium	1–10	Houck (5–1)	**Puk** (5–3)	None	1,855	24–8	6–5
April 5	at Missouri	No. 5	Taylor Stadium	3–5	Fairbanks (3–3)	**Dunning** (4–1)	None	1,051	24–9	6–6
April 7	Stetson	No. 10	McKethan Stadium	22–2	**Faedo** (2–1)	Schaly (3–3)	None	2,690	25–9	–
April 10	No. 21 South Carolina	No. 10	McKethan Stadium	14–3	**Poyner** (3–1)	Crowe (3–4)	None	5,060	26–9	7–6
April 11	No. 21 South Carolina	No. 10	McKethan Stadium	12–5	**Puk** (6–3)	Wynkoop (4–4)	None	5,076	27–9	8–6
April 12	No. 21 South Carolina	No. 10	McKethan Stadium	12–2	**Faedo** (3–1)	Widener (1–3)	None	2,997	28–9	9–6
April 14	at No. 13 Florida State; Rivalry	No. 7	Dick Howser Stadium; Tallahassee, FL	3–4^{12}	Strode (2–0)	**Rubio** (0–1)	None	6,634	28–10	–
April 17	at Mississippi State	No. 7	Dudy Noble Field; Starkville, MS	6–3	**Shore** (6–2)	Laster (4–3)	None	9,492	29–10	10–6
April 18	at Mississippi State	No. 7	Dudy Noble Field	2–1	**Rhodes** (1–0)	Brown (5–4)	**Poyner** (3)	13,004	30–10	11–6
April 19	at Mississippi State	No. 7	Dudy Noble Field	10–5	**Lewis** (2–1)	Sexton (3–4)	None	7,507	31–10	12–6
April 21	Bethune–Cookman	No. 6	McKethan Stadium	2–1	**Poyner** (3–1)	Clymer (0–3)	None	2,446	32–10	–
April 24	Kentucky	No. 6	McKethan Stadium	0–3	Brown (4–4)	**Shore** (6–3)	Salow (2)	3,516	32–11	12–7
April 25	Kentucky	No. 6	McKethan Stadium	6–7	Beggs (6–2)	**Dunning** (4–2)	Salow (3)	4,419	32–12	12–8
April 26	Kentucky	No. 6	McKethan Stadium	10–3	**Faedo** (4–1)	Nelson (2–3)	None	2,825	33–12	13–8

May

Date	Opponent	Rank	Stadium Site	Score	Win	Loss	Save	Attendance	Overall Record	SEC Record
May 1	at Georgia	No. 8	Foley Field; Athens, GA	1–11	Soesbee (3–2)	**Shore** (6–4)	None	3,038	33–13	13–9
May 2	at Georgia	No. 8	Foley Field	3–2	**Poyner** (4–1)	McLaughlin (3–5)	None	2,888	34–13	14–9
May 3	at Georgia	No. 8	Foley Field	7–4	**Lewis** (3–1)	Walsh (4–2)	**Young** (2)	2,883	35–13	15–9
May 5	South Florida	No. 9	McKethan Stadium	5–1	**Dunning** (5–2)	Eveld (1–2)	None	2,534	36–13	–
May 7	at No. 8 Vanderbilt	No. 9	Hawkins Field; Nashville, TN	0–2	Fulmer (10–1)	**Shore** (6–5)	None	3,626	36–14	15–10
May 8	at No. 8 Vanderbilt	No. 9	Hawkins Field	7–3	**Puk** (7–3)	Pfeifer (3–4)	None	3,626	37–14	16–10
May 9	at No. 8 Vanderbilt	No. 9	Hawkins Field	9–7^{10}	**Lewis** (4–1)	Sheffield (4–2)	None	3,626	38–14	17–10
May 14	Auburn	No. 7	McKethan Stadium	1–4	Lipscomb (7–2)	**Shore** (6–6)	Camp (8)	2,736	38–15	17–11
May 15	Auburn	No. 7	McKethan Stadium	4–3	**Rhodes** (2–0)	McCord (5–4)	**Snead** (1)	3,295	39–15	18–11
May 16	Auburn	No. 7	McKethan Stadium	3–1	**Lewis** (5–1)	Rentz (3–3)	**Poyner** (4)	3,175	40–15	19–11

Postseason
SEC Tournament

Date	Opponent	Rank	Stadium Site	Score	Win	Loss	Save	Attendance	Overall Record	SECT Record
May 20	vs. No. 24 (5) Arkansas	No. 7 (4)	Metropolitan Stadium; Hoover, AL	6–7	Lowery (6–1)	**Poyner** (4–2)	Jackson (6)	10,142	40–16	0–1
May 21	vs. (9) Auburn	No. 7 (4)	Metropolitan Stadium	11–2	**Shore** (7–6)	Rentz (3–4)	None	6,526	41–16	1–1
May 22	vs. No. 24 (5) Arkansas	No. 7 (4)	Metropolitan Stadium	10–0^{7}	**Puk** (8–3)	Taccolini (6–4)	None	10,329	42–16	2–1
May 23	vs. No. 1 (1) LSU	No. 7 (4)	Metropolitan Stadium	2–1	**Lewis** (6–1)	Stallings (1–2)	None	10,949	43–16	3–1
May 24	vs. No. 9 (2) Vanderbilt	No. 7 (4)	Metropolitan Stadium	7–3	**Young** (2–0)	Johnson (5–1)	None	10,590	44–16	4–1

NCAA tournament: Gainesville Regional

Date	Opponent	Rank	Stadium Site	Score	Win	Loss	Save	Attendance	Overall Record	Regional Record
May 29	(4) Florida A&M	No. 3 (1)	McKethan Stadium	19–0	**Shore** (8–6)	Page (2–1)	None	3,833	45–16	1–0
May 30	(3) South Florida	No. 3 (1)	McKethan Stadium	8–2	**Puk** (9–3)	Valdes (5–4)	None	3,305	46–16	2–0
May 31	No. 21 (2) Florida Atlantic	No. 3 (1)	McKethan Stadium	2–1	**Faedo** (5–1)	Labsan (2–3)	**Lewis** (7)	2,053	47–16	3–0

NCAA tournament: Gainesville Super Regional

Date	Opponent	Rank	Stadium Site	Score	Win	Loss	Save	Attendance	Overall Record	Super Reg. Record
June 5	No. 10 Florida State; Rivalry	No. 3 (4)	McKethan Stadium	13–5	**Shore** (9–6)	Biegalski (7–5)	None	5,709	48–16	1–0
June 6	No. 10 Florida State; Rivalry	No. 3 (4)	McKethan Stadium	11–4	**Poyner** (5–2)	Compton (4–4)	None	5,772	49–16	2–0

College World Series

Date	Opponent	Rank	Stadium Site	Score	Win	Loss	Save	Attendance	Overall Record	CWS Record
June 13	vs. No. 8 (5) Miami; Rivalry	No. 3 (4)	TD Ameritrade Park; Omaha, NE	15–3	**Shore** (10–6)	Suarez (9–2)	None	26,377	50–16	1–0
June 15	vs. Virginia	No. 3 (4)	TD Ameritrade Park	0–1	Waddell (4–5)	**Puk** (9–4)	Sborz (15)	19,544	50–17	1–1
June 17	vs. No. 8 (5) Miami; Rivalry	No. 3 (4)	TD Ameritrade Park	10–2	**Faedo** (6–2)	Sosa (7–5)	None	24,033	51–17	2–1
June 19	vs. Virginia	No. 3 (4)	TD Ameritrade Park	10–5	**Shore** (11–6)	Kirby (5–3)	None	19,015	52–17	3–1
June 20	vs. Virginia	No. 3 (4)	TD Ameritrade Park	4–5	Sborz (6–2)	**Lewis** (6–2)	None	15,560	52–18	3–2

Rankings from USA Today/ESPN Top 25 coaches' baseball poll. Parentheses indicate tournament seedings. Retrieved from FloridaGators.com

== Record vs. conference opponents ==
Last two do not qualify for conf. tourn. Blank are not scheduled. Blue are home games, otherwise away.

2015 SEC baseball records Source: 2015 SEC baseball game results
Team	W–L	ALA	ARK	AUB	FLA	UGA	KEN	LSU	MSU	MIZZ	MISS	SCAR	TENN	TAMU	VAN	Team	Div	SR	SW
ALA	12–18		0–3	3–0	1–2	2–1	.	0–3	2–1	1–2	1–2	.	.	1–2	1–2	ALA	W6	3–7	1–2
ARK	17–12	3–0		2–1	.	2–1	2–1	1–2	2–1	.	2–1	.	1–1	2–1	0–3	ARK	W3	7–2	1–1
AUB	13–17	0–3	1–2		1–2	3–0	.	1–2	2–1	.	2–1	2–1	.	0–3	1–2	AUB	W5	4–6	1–2
FLA	19–11	2–1	.	2–1		2–1	1–2	.	3–0	1–2	1–2	3–0	2–1	.	2–1	FLA	E2	7–3	2–0
UGA	10–19	1–2	1–2	0–3	1–2		2–1	0–2	.	0–3	.	2–1	3–0	.	0–3	UGA	E7	3–7	1–3
KEN	14–15	.	1–2	.	2–1	1–2		2–1	2–1	2–1	.	0–3	3–0	0–2	1–2	KEN	E4	5–5	1–1
LSU	21–8	3–0	2–1	2–1	.	2–0	1–2		2–1	3–0	2–1	2–1	.	2–1	.	LSU	W1	9–1	2–0
MSU	8–22	1–2	1–2	1–2	0–3	.	1–2	1–2		.	0–3	2–1	0–3	1–2	.	MSU	W7	1–9	0–3
MIZZ	15–15	2–1	.	.	2–1	3–0	1–2	0–3	.		2–1	2–1	2–1	1–2	0–3	MIZZ	E3	6–4	1–2
MISS	15–14	2–1	1–2	1–2	2–1	.	.	1–2	3–0	1–2		.	1–2	1–1	2–1	MISS	W4	4–5	1–0
SCAR	13–17	.	.	1–2	0–3	1–2	3–0	1–2	1–2	1–2	.		1–2	2–1	2–1	SCAR	E5	3–7	1–1
TENN	11–18	.	1–1	.	1–2	0–3	0–3	.	3–0	1–2	2–1	2–1		0–3	1–2	TENN	E6	3–6	1–3
TAMU	18–10	2–1	1–2	3–0	.	.	2–0	1–2	2–1	2–1	1–1	1–2	3–0		.	TAMU	W2	6–3	2–0
VAN	20–10	2–1	3–0	2–1	1–2	3–0	2–1	.	.	3–0	1–2	1–2	2–1	.		VAN	E1	7–3	3–0
Team	W–L	ALA	ARK	AUB	FLA	UGA	KEN	LSU	MSU	MIZZ	MISS	SCAR	TENN	TAMU	VAN	Team	Div	SR	SW

Updated for entire regular season.

== Rankings ==
Ranking movements Legend: ██ Increase in ranking ██ Decrease in ranking ( ) = First-place votes
	Week																		
Poll	Pre	1	2	3	4	5	6	7	8	9	10	11	12	13	14	15	16	17	Final
Coaches'	5	5*	5*	2 (3)	3 (5)	3 (4)	5	5 (1)	10	7	6	8	9	7	7	3 (3)	3 (3)*	3 (3)*	3
Baseball America	6	6	6	4	2	2	4	4	10	8	6	6	10	6	6	6	6*	6*	3
Collegiate Baseball^	6	5	5	5	5	4	6	6	17	12	10	12	14	9	9	7	6	2	3
NCBWA†	5	5	3	3	4	3	6	6	10	6	5	9	8	7	6	3	2	2*	3

^ Collegiate Baseball ranked 40 teams in their preseason poll, but only ranked 30 teams weekly during the season.
† NCBWA ranks 30 teams in their preseason poll, but only ranks 25 teams weekly during the season.
* A new poll was not released for this week, so for comparison purposes, the previous week's ranking is inserted in this week's slot.

== Gators in the MLB draft ==
Round	Selection	Player	Position	Team
1	20	Richie Martin	SS	Oakland Athletics
3	100	Harrison Bader	OF	St. Louis Cardinals
6	181	Eric Hanhold	RHP	Milwaukee Brewers
8	242	Danny Young	LHP	Toronto Blue Jays
9	270	Taylor Lewis	RHP	Atlanta Braves
10	294	Josh Tobias	3B	Philadelphia Phillies
14	411	Bobby Poyner	LHP	Boston Red Sox
24	730	Mike Vinson	RHP	Detroit Tigers
28	855	Aaron Rhodes	RHP	Los Angeles Angels of Anaheim
