= 2015 Alabama Crimson Tide baseball team =

American college baseball season

2015 Alabama Crimson Tide baseball
- Conference: Southeastern Conference
- West
- Record: 32-28 (12-18 SEC)
- Head coach: Mitch Gaspard (6th season)
- Hitting coach: Andy Phillips
- Pitching coach: Dax Norris
- Home stadium: Hoover Metropolitan Stadium

2015 Southeastern Conference baseball standings
	Conf.				Overall
Team	W		L	PCT	W		L	PCT
Eastern
No. 2 Vanderbilt ^{x}‍‍‍^{y}	20	–	10	.667	51	–	21	.708
No. 3 Florida ‍‍‡‍^{y}	19	–	11	.633	52	–	18	.743
Missouri ‍‍‍	15	–	15	.500	30	–	28	.517
Kentucky ‍‍‍	14	–	15	.483	30	–	25	.545
South Carolina ‍‍‍	13	–	17	.433	32	–	25	.561
Tennessee ‍‍‍	11	–	18	.379	24	–	26	.480
Georgia ‍‍‍	10	–	19	.345	26	–	28	.481
Western
No. 5 LSU ^{x}‍†‍‍^{y}	21	–	8	.724	54	–	12	.818
No. 11 Texas A&M ‍‍‍^{y}	18	–	10	.643	50	–	14	.781
No. 7 Arkansas ‍‍‍^{y}	17	–	12	.586	40	–	25	.615
Ole Miss ‍‍‍^{y}	15	–	14	.517	30	–	28	.517
Auburn ‍‍‍^{y}	13	–	17	.433	36	–	26	.581
Alabama ‍‍‍	12	–	18	.400	32	–	28	.533
Mississippi State ‍‍‍	8	–	22	.267	24	–	30	.444
x – Division champion † – Conference champion ‡ – Tournament champion y – Invited to the NCAA tournament Rankings from Collegiate Baseball

The 2015 Alabama Crimson Tide baseball team represented the University of Alabama in the 2015 NCAA Division I baseball season. The Crimson Tide played their home games at the Hoover Metropolitan Stadium in Hoover due to renovations at their normal on-campus home of Sewell–Thomas Stadium.

== Personnel ==
=== Returning starters ===
Player	Class	Position
Will Haynie	Sophomore	C
Chance Vincent	Junior	3B
Georgie Salem	Junior	CF
Jon Keller	Senior	SP

=== Roster ===
2015 Alabama Crimson Tide roster
Pitchers: 15 Geoffrey Bramblett - Sophomore; 16 Jake Walters- Freshman; 17 Jay Shaw - Senior; 18 Will Carter - Junior; 20 Taylor Guilbeau - Senior; 23 Ray Castillo - Junior; 27 Zac Rogers - Freshman; 28 Jake Hubbard - (redshirt) Junior; 29 Nick Eicholtz - Sophomore; 32 Andrew DiPiazza - Freshman; 34 Alex Watkins - Freshman; 35 Jon Keller - Senior; 36 Tyler McMurray- Freshman; 40 Thomas Burrows - Sophomore; 42 Tyler Adams - (redshirt) Freshman; 55 Mike Oczypok - (redshirt) Sophomore	Catchers: 24 Will Haynie - Sophomore; 31 Grady Bailey - Freshman; 41 Taylor Poe - (redshirt) Sophomore; Infielders: 1 Mikey White - Junior; 3 Daniel Cucjen - Junior; 5 Chandler Avant - Freshman; 6 Kyle Overstreet - Junior; 12 Chance Vincent - Junior; 37 Zack Coker - Freshman; 39 Connor Short - Sophomore	Outfielders: 7 Casey Hughston - Sophomore; 13 William Elliott - Sophomore; 14 Jamal Howard - Freshman; 22 Georgie Salem - Junior; 25 Ryan Blanchard - (redshirt) Junior; 45 Riley Colburn - Junior; Utility: 9 Cody Henry - Freshman; 21 Colton Freeman - (redshirt) Sophomore; 33 Mitch Greer - Junior; 38 J.C. Wilhite - Senior

=== Coaching staff ===
2015 Alabama Crimson Tide baseball coaching staff
- Mitch Gaspard – Head Coach - 15 years at Alabama (6th as Head Coach)
- Andy Phillips – Assistant Coach, Hitting Coach - 5th year
- Dax Norris – Assistant Coach, Pitching Coach, Recruiting Coordinator - 8th year
- Nathan Kilcrease – Volunteer Coach - 1st year
- David Kindred – Director of Baseball Operations - 1st year

== Schedule and results ==
2015 Alabama Crimson Tide baseball game log
Regular season
February (7–3)

Date	Opponent	Rank	Site/stadium	Score	Win	Loss	Save	Attendance	Overall record	SEC record
February 13	UMES		Hoover Met	6–0	T. Guilbeau (1–0)	J. Stinnett (0–1)	R. Castillo (1)	2,535	1–0	–
February 14	UMES		Hoover Met	11–0	W. Carter (1–0)	J. Bone (0–1)	None	2,783	2–0	–
February 15	UMES		Hoover Met	19–0	G. Bramblett (1–0)	T. Whiteman (0–1)	None	2,410	3–0	–
February 20	at #6 Houston	#30	Cougar Field	1–3	A. Lantrip (2–0)	T. Guilbeau (1–1)	S. Romero (2)	1,989	3–1	–
February 21	at #6 Houston	#30	Cougar Field	9–14	B. Maxwell (2–0)	T. Burrows (0–1)	None	2,463	3–2	–
February 22	at #6 Houston	#30	Cougar Field	8–3	G. Bramblett (2–0)	A. Garza (0–1)	R. Castillo (2)	1,883	4–2	–
February 24	Savannah State		Hoover Met	7–2	J. Walters (1–0)	R. Doyle (0–1)	None	2,500	5–2	–
February 24	Savannah State		Hoover Met	4–2	J. Hubbard (1–0)	G. Hollman (0–1)	J. Wilhite (1)	2,232	4–2	–
February 27	Louisiana–Lafayette		Hoover Met	6–4	R. Castillo (1–0)	W. Bacon (0–1)	None	2,343	5–2	–
February 28	Louisiana–Lafayette		Hoover Met	5–6	R. Cooper (2–0)	T. Burrows (0–2)	C. Lee (2)	2,863	6–2	–

March (8–9)

Date	Opponent	Rank	Site/stadium	Score	Win	Loss	Save	Attendance	Overall record	SEC record
March 1	Louisiana–Lafayette		Hoover Met	2–14	G. Leger (2–0)	G. Bramblett (2–1)	None	2,738	7–4	–
March 3†	Auburn		Riverwalk Stadium	3–5	K. Thompson (3–1)	J. Hubbard (1–1)	T. Wingenter (1)	6,219	7–5	–
March 6	Lipscomb		Hank Aaron Stadium	5–1	T. Guilbeau (2–1)	I. Martinez (2–1)	T. Burrows (1)	1,735	8–5	–
March 7	Lipscomb		Hank Aaron Stadium	3–7	N. Andros (1–0)	W. Carter (1–1)	None	2,270	8–6	–
March 8	Lipscomb		Hank Aaron Stadium	3–0	G. Bramblett (3–1)	D. Norman (1–1)	T. Burrows (2)	1,807	9–6	–
March 10	Alabama A&M		Hoover Met	Canceled						
March 10	Alabama A&M		Hoover Met	Canceled						
March 14	at #16 Mississippi St.		Dudy Noble Field	10–5	J. Hubbard (1–0)	T. Fitts (1–2)	None	–	10–6	1–0
March 14	at #16 Mississippi St.		Dudy Noble Field	1–4	A. Sexton (3–0)	W. Carter (1–2)	None	8,634	10–7	1–1
March 15	at #16 Mississippi St.		Dudy Noble Field	8–4	R. Castillo (2–0)	M. Gentry (0–1)	T. Burrows (3)	7,535	11–7	2–1
March 17	Samford		Hoover Met	8–6	J. Walters (2–0)	T. Widra (0–1)	T. Burrows (4)	2,701	12–7	–
March 20	#2 Texas A&M		Hoover Met	2–4	G. Long (5–0)	T. Guilbeau (2–2)	R. Hendrix (5)	2,701	12–8	2–2
March 21	#2 Texas A&M		Hoover Met	5–10	K. Simonds (6–0)	M. Greer (0–1)	None	–	12–9	2–3
March 21	#2 Texas A&M		Hoover Met	6–2	G. Bramblett (4–1)	T. Larkins (2–1)	R. Castillo (3)	–	13–9	3–3
March 24	at South Alabama		Eddie Stanky Field	0–3	A. Bembnowski (2–2)	J. Walters (2–1)	B. Taylor (2)	3,047	13–10	–
March 27	at #6 Florida		McKethan Stadium	12–9^{(10)}	R. Castillo (3–0)	T. Lewis (1–1)	None	–	14–10	4–3
March 27	at #6 Florida		McKethan Stadium	1–8	L. Shore (4–2)	W. Carter (1–3)	None	3,123	14–11	4–4
March 28	at #6 Florida		McKethan Stadium	4–7	A. Puk (5–2)	J. Hubbard (2–2)	None	4,367	14–12	4–5
March 31	at UAB		Regions Park	7–2	N. Eicholtz (1–0)	T. Lowery (5–2)	None	3,226	15–12	–

April (8–10)

Date	Opponent	Rank	Site/stadium	Score	Win	Loss	Save	Attendance	Overall record	SEC record
April 2	#5 LSU		Hoover Met	5–8^{(16)}	D. Norman (2–1)	J. Wilhite (0–1)	None	4,117	15–13	4–6
April 3	#5 LSU		Hoover Met	2–6	A. Lange (6–0)	W. Carter (1–4)	None	3,963	15–14	4–7
April 4	#5 LSU		Hoover Met	4–6^{(13)}	J. Stallings (1–1)	T. Burrows (0–3)	None	5,381	15–15	4–8
April 7	at Samford		Griffin Stadium	12–1	J. Walters (3–1)	E. Wright (2–3)	N. Eicholtz (1)	1,023	16–15	–
April 10	Georgia		Hoover Met	7–6^{(11)}	M. Greer (1–1)	J. Cheek (2–2)	None	3,247	17–15	5–8
April 11	Georgia		Hoover Met	1–8	R. Lawlor (4–4)	W. Carter (1–5)	None	3,597	17–16	5–9
April 12	Georgia		Hoover Met	5–2	G. Bramblett (5–1)	J. Walsh (3–1)	J. Walters (1)	3,303	18–16	6–9
April 14	UAB		Hoover Met	5–1	N. Eicholtz (2–0)	D. Munger (0–1)	None	2,456	19–16	–
April 17	at #17 Missouri		Taylor Stadium	3–4	R. McClain (5–4)	T. Guilbeau (2–3)	B. Williams (9)	1,763	19–17	6–10
April 18	at #17 Missouri		Taylor Stadium	6–0	J. Walters (4–1)	T. Houck (6–2)	None	612	20–17	7–10
April 19	at #17 Missouri		Taylor Stadium	3–5	A. Schwaab (2–0)	G. Bramblett (5–2)	B. Williams (10)	345	20–18	7–11
April 21	MS Valley State		Hoover Met	3–1	N. Eicholtz (3–0)	T. Case (3–7)	R. Castillo (4)	–	21–18	–
April 21	MS Valley State		Hoover Met	16–5	W. Carter (2–5)	B. Thomas (1–8)	None	2,413	22–18	–
April 25	at Ole Miss		Swayze Field	2–10	C. Trent (6–4)	T. Guilbeau (2–4)	None	8,042	22–19	7–12
April 25	at Ole Miss		Swayze Field	0–4	B. Bramlett (5–2)	J. Walters (4–2)	S. Weathersby (3)	10,119	22–20	7–13
April 26	at Ole Miss		Swayze Field	13–4	G. Bramblett (6–2)	W. Stokes (1–5)	None	8,101	23–20	8–13
April 28	Southern Miss		Hoover Met	2–6^{(7)}	C. Cockrell (3–0)	N. Eicholtz (2–1)	None	2,354	23–21	–
April 30	#30 Arkansas		Hoover Met	1–5	T. Killian (2–3)	T. Guilbeau (2–5)	Z. Jackson (5)	2,602	23–22	8–14

May (7–4)

Date	Opponent	Rank	Site/stadium	Score	Win	Loss	Save	Attendance	Overall record	SEC record
May 1	#30 Arkansas		Hoover Met	4–8	J. Lowery (5–1)	J. Walters (4–3)	J. Teague (2)	3,343	23–23	8–15
May 2	#30 Arkansas		Hoover Met	0–4	K. McKinney (4–1)	G. Bramblett (6–3)	None	3,413	23–24	8–16
May 5	Alabama A&M		Hoover Met	7–2	J. Shaw (1–0)	D. Smith (2–6)	J. Wilhite (2)	–	24–24	–
May 5	Alabama A&M		Hoover Met	7–2	A. Watkins (1–0)	T. Knight (0–3)	None	2,361	25–24	–
May 8	at Auburn		Plainsman Park	4–2	T. Burrows (1–3)	T. Wingenter (1–5)	None	4,096	26–24	9–16
May 9	at Auburn		Plainsman Park	7–6	J. Shaw (2–0)	J. Camp (2–1)	T. Burrows (5)	4,096	27–24	10–16
May 10	at Auburn		Plainsman Park	14–4	G. Bramblett (7–3)	D. Rentz (3–2)	None	2,894	28–24	11–16
May 12	Mercer		Davis Stadium	5–3	W. Carter (3–5)	D. Johnson (1–3)	None	2,569	29–24	–
May 14	#10 Vanderbilt		Hoover Met	1–2	C. Fulmer (11–1)	T. Guilbeau (2–6)	None	2,906	29–25	11–17
May 15	#10 Vanderbilt		Hoover Met	5–7	J. Sheffield (5–2)	J. Walters (4–4)	K. Wright (1)	3,515	29–26	11–18
May 16	#10 Vanderbilt		Hoover Met	1–0	W. Carter (4–5)	W. Buehler (3–2)	T. Burrows (6)	3,684	30–26	12–18

Postseason
SEC Tournament (2-2)

Date	Opponent	Site/stadium	Score	Win	Loss	Save	Attendance	Overall record	SECT record
May 19	Ole Miss	Hoover Met	6–1	G. Bramblett (8–3)	S. Weathersby (4–2)	None	4,817	31–26	1–0
May 20	#8 Texas A&M	Hoover Met	3–4	R. Hendrix (5–2)	R. Castillo (3–1)	A. Vinson (4)	5,205	31–27	1–1
May 21	Missouri	Hoover Met	4–3	T. Guilbeau (3–6)	T. Houck (8–5)	T. Burrows (7)	6,526	32–27	2–1
May 22	#7 Vanderbilt	Hoover Met	1–16^{(7)}	P. Pfeifer (4–4)	W. Carter (4–6)	None	10,329[	32–28	2–2

† Indicates the game does not count toward the 2015 Southeastern Conference standings.
*Rankings are based on the team's current ranking in the Collegiate Baseball poll.

== Honors and awards ==
- Mikey White was selected as a Preseason Third Team All-American by Perfect Game USA.
- Mikey White was selected as a Preseason Second Team All-American by D1Baseball.

== Record vs. conference opponents ==
Last two do not qualify for conf. tourn. Blank are not scheduled. Blue are home games, otherwise away.

2015 SEC baseball records Source: 2015 SEC baseball game results
Team	W–L	ALA	ARK	AUB	FLA	UGA	KEN	LSU	MSU	MIZZ	MISS	SCAR	TENN	TAMU	VAN	Team	Div	SR	SW
ALA	12–18		0–3	3–0	1–2	2–1	.	0–3	2–1	1–2	1–2	.	.	1–2	1–2	ALA	W6	3–7	1–2
ARK	17–12	3–0		2–1	.	2–1	2–1	1–2	2–1	.	2–1	.	1–1	2–1	0–3	ARK	W3	7–2	1–1
AUB	13–17	0–3	1–2		1–2	3–0	.	1–2	2–1	.	2–1	2–1	.	0–3	1–2	AUB	W5	4–6	1–2
FLA	19–11	2–1	.	2–1		2–1	1–2	.	3–0	1–2	1–2	3–0	2–1	.	2–1	FLA	E2	7–3	2–0
UGA	10–19	1–2	1–2	0–3	1–2		2–1	0–2	.	0–3	.	2–1	3–0	.	0–3	UGA	E7	3–7	1–3
KEN	14–15	.	1–2	.	2–1	1–2		2–1	2–1	2–1	.	0–3	3–0	0–2	1–2	KEN	E4	5–5	1–1
LSU	21–8	3–0	2–1	2–1	.	2–0	1–2		2–1	3–0	2–1	2–1	.	2–1	.	LSU	W1	9–1	2–0
MSU	8–22	1–2	1–2	1–2	0–3	.	1–2	1–2		.	0–3	2–1	0–3	1–2	.	MSU	W7	1–9	0–3
MIZZ	15–15	2–1	.	.	2–1	3–0	1–2	0–3	.		2–1	2–1	2–1	1–2	0–3	MIZZ	E3	6–4	1–2
MISS	15–14	2–1	1–2	1–2	2–1	.	.	1–2	3–0	1–2		.	1–2	1–1	2–1	MISS	W4	4–5	1–0
SCAR	13–17	.	.	1–2	0–3	1–2	3–0	1–2	1–2	1–2	.		1–2	2–1	2–1	SCAR	E5	3–7	1–1
TENN	11–18	.	1–1	.	1–2	0–3	0–3	.	3–0	1–2	2–1	2–1		0–3	1–2	TENN	E6	3–6	1–3
TAMU	18–10	2–1	1–2	3–0	.	.	2–0	1–2	2–1	2–1	1–1	1–2	3–0		.	TAMU	W2	6–3	2–0
VAN	20–10	2–1	3–0	2–1	1–2	3–0	2–1	.	.	3–0	1–2	1–2	2–1	.		VAN	E1	7–3	3–0
Team	W–L	ALA	ARK	AUB	FLA	UGA	KEN	LSU	MSU	MIZZ	MISS	SCAR	TENN	TAMU	VAN	Team	Div	SR	SW

Updated for entire regular season.

== Rankings ==
Ranking movements Legend: ██ Increase in ranking ██ Decrease in ranking — = Not ranked RV = Received votes
	Week																			
Poll	Pre	1	2	3	4	5	6	7	8	9	10	11	12	13	14	15	16	17	18	Final
Coaches'	RV	RV*	RV	RV	—	RV	RV	—	—	—	—	—	—	—	—	—	—	—	—	—
Baseball America	—	—	—	—	—	—	—	—	—	—	—	—	—	—	—	—	—	—	—	—
Collegiate Baseball^	RV	30	—	—	—	—	—	—	—	—	—	—	—	—	—	—	—	—	—	—
NCBWA†	28	23	25	28	RV	RV	RV	—	—	—	—	—	—	—	—	—	—	—	—	—

^ Collegiate Baseball ranked 40 teams in their preseason poll, but only ranked 30 teams weekly during the season.
† NCBWA ranks 30 teams in their preseason poll, but only ranks 25 teams weekly during the season.
* A new poll was not released for this week, so for comparison purposes, the previous week's ranking is inserted in this week's slot.

== See also ==
- 2015 Alabama Crimson Tide softball team
