= 2015 LSU Tigers baseball team =

American college baseball season

2015 LSU Tigers baseball

SEC Champions Baton Rouge Regional Champions Baton Rouge Super Regional Champions College World Series
- Conference: Southeastern Conference

Ranking
- Coaches: No. 5
- Record: 54–12 (21–8 SEC)
- Head coach: Paul Mainieri (9th season)
- Hitting coach: Andy Cannizaro (1st season)
- Pitching coach: Alan Dunn (4th season)
- Home stadium: Alex Box Stadium

2015 Southeastern Conference baseball standings
| | Conf. | | | | Overall |
| Team | W | | L | PCT | W | | L | PCT |
|---|---|---|---|---|---|---|---|---|
Eastern
| No. 2 Vanderbilt ^{x}‍‍‍^{y} | 20 | – | 10 | .667 | 51 | – | 21 | .708 |
| No. 3 Florida ‍‍‡‍^{y} | 19 | – | 11 | .633 | 52 | – | 18 | .743 |
| Missouri ‍‍‍ | 15 | – | 15 | .500 | 30 | – | 28 | .517 |
| Kentucky ‍‍‍ | 14 | – | 15 | .483 | 30 | – | 25 | .545 |
| South Carolina ‍‍‍ | 13 | – | 17 | .433 | 32 | – | 25 | .561 |
| Tennessee ‍‍‍ | 11 | – | 18 | .379 | 24 | – | 26 | .480 |
| Georgia ‍‍‍ | 10 | – | 19 | .345 | 26 | – | 28 | .481 |
Western
| No. 5 LSU ^{x}‍†‍‍^{y} | 21 | – | 8 | .724 | 54 | – | 12 | .818 |
| No. 11 Texas A&M ‍‍‍^{y} | 18 | – | 10 | .643 | 50 | – | 14 | .781 |
| No. 7 Arkansas ‍‍‍^{y} | 17 | – | 12 | .586 | 40 | – | 25 | .615 |
| Ole Miss ‍‍‍^{y} | 15 | – | 14 | .517 | 30 | – | 28 | .517 |
| Auburn ‍‍‍^{y} | 13 | – | 17 | .433 | 36 | – | 26 | .581 |
| Alabama ‍‍‍ | 12 | – | 18 | .400 | 32 | – | 28 | .533 |
| Mississippi State ‍‍‍ | 8 | – | 22 | .267 | 24 | – | 30 | .444 |
x – Division champion † – Conference champion ‡ – Tournament champion y – Invited to the NCAA tournament Rankings from Collegiate Baseball

The 2015 LSU Tigers baseball team represented Louisiana State University during the 2015 NCAA Division I baseball season. The Tigers played their home games at Alex Box Stadium as a member of the Southeastern Conference. They were led by head coach Paul Mainieri, in his 9th season at LSU.

At the end of the regular season, junior shortstop Alex Bregman was selected by the Houston Astros as the second pick of the 2015 MLB draft. Bregman was the fifth LSU Tiger to be drafted in the first round in seven years, the highest-drafted position player in LSU's history, and the second-highest overall behind pitcher Ben McDonald (1989).

== Previous season ==
In 2014, the Tigers finished the season 2nd in the SEC's Western Division with a record of 46–16–1, 17–11–1 in conference play. They qualified for the 2014 Southeastern Conference baseball tournament and defeated Florida in the final, 2–0, to win their 11th SEC Tournament title. They qualified for the 2014 NCAA Division I baseball tournament as the SEC's automatic bid, and were selected as the #8 overall national seed. The Tigers were selected as hosts of the Baton Rouge regional, which included Houston, Bryant, and Southeastern Louisiana. The Tigers won their first two games of the regional, defeating Southeastern Louisiana, 8–4, and Houston, 5–1. In the regional final, LSU was again matched up with Houston. In the first game of the regional final, the Cougars defeated the Tigers, 5–4, in 11 innings. The Cougars went on to win game two, 12–2, eliminating LSU and advancing to the Austin Super Regional, where they lost in two games to Texas.

== Personnel ==
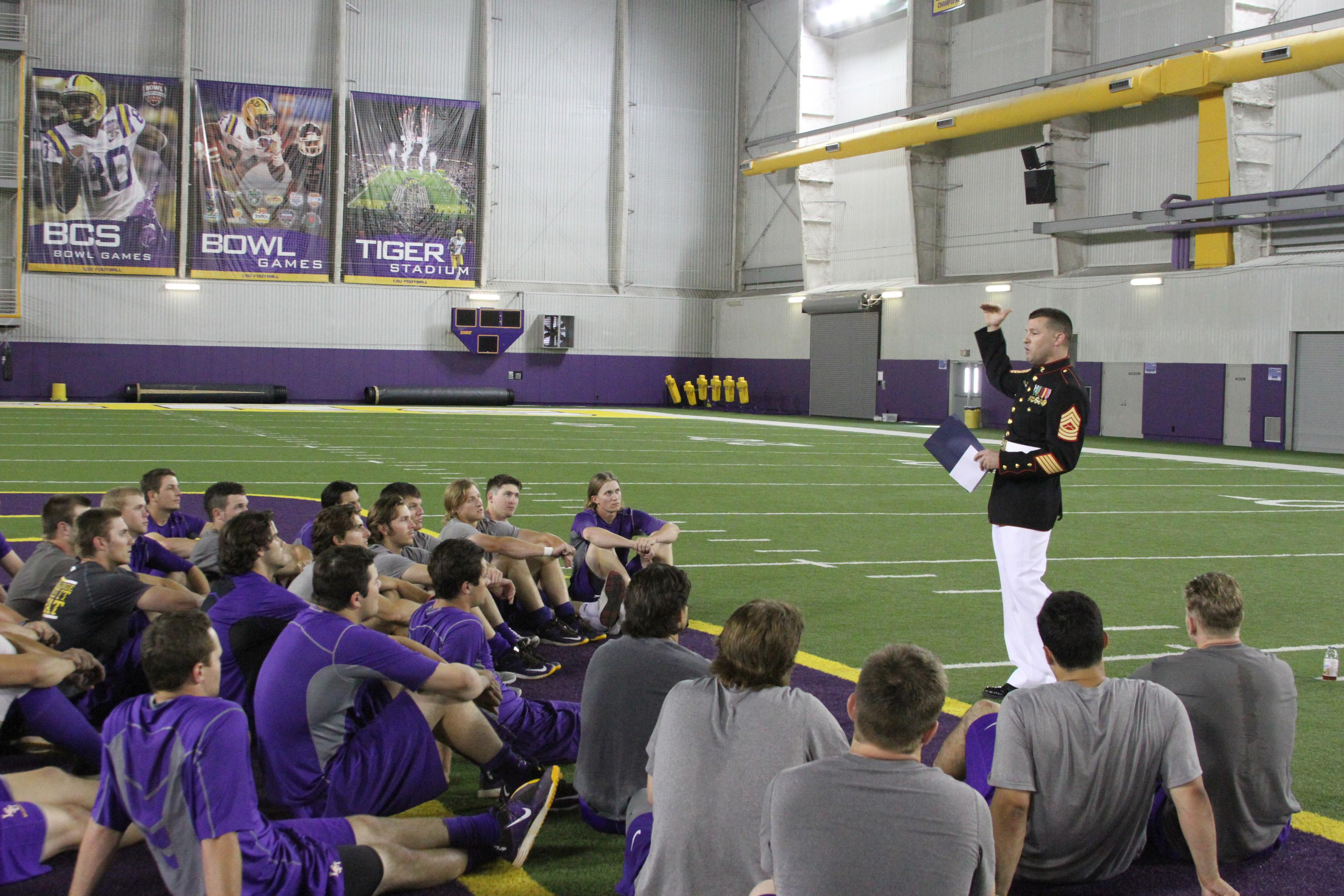
The Tigers receiving a motivational speech from a United States Marines Corps sergeant before the 2015 NCAA Division I baseball tournament

=== Roster ===
2015 LSU Tigers roster
| Pitchers: 12 - Hunter Devall - Junior; 13 - Brady Domangue - Senior; 16 - Jared Poché - Sophomore; 18 - Austin Bain - Freshman; 21 - Doug Norman - Freshman; 28 - Kyle Bowman - Senior; 29 - Jake Godfrey - Freshman; 30 - Collin Strall - Sophomore; 32 - Alden Cartwright - Sophomore; 35 - Alex Lange - Freshman; 37 - Jesse Stallings - Freshman; 40 - Ryan May - Freshman; 45 - Russell Reynolds - Sophomore; 46 - Parker Bugg - Sophomore; 49 - Zac Person - Senior; 55 - Hunter Newman - Sophomore; 67 - Jacob Latz - Freshman | Catchers: 2 - Michael Papierski - Freshman; 22 - Kade Scivicque - Senior; 25 - Bryce Jordan - Freshman; 26 - Chris Chinea - Junior; Infielders: 3 - Kramer Robertson - Sophomore; 7 - Greg Deichmann - Freshman; 8 - Alex Bregman - Junior; 10 - Grayson Byrd - Freshman; 20 - Conner Hale - Senior; 27 - Danny Zardon - Sophomore | Outfielders: 5 - Chris Sciambra - Senior; 6 - Andrew Stevenson - Junior; 9 - Mark Laird - Junior; 17 - Jared Foster - Senior; 23 - Jake Fraley - Sophomore; 24 - Beau Jordan - Freshman |

=== Coaching staff ===
| Name | Position | Seasons at LSU | Alma mater |
|---|---|---|---|
| Paul Mainieri | Head coach | 9 | Florida International University (1980) |
| Andy Cannizaro | Assistant coach | 1 | Tulane University (2001) |
| Alan Dunn | Assistant coach | 4 | University of Alabama at Birmingham (1991) |

== Schedule ==
Legend
| | LSU win |
| | LSU loss |
| | Postponement |
| **Bold** | LSU team member |

2015 LSU Tigers Game Log
Regular season
February

| Date | Opponent | Rank | Site/stadium | Score | Win | Loss | Save | Attendance | Overall record | SEC record |
|---|---|---|---|---|---|---|---|---|---|---|
| February 13 | Kansas | #4 | Alex Box Stadium • Baton Rouge, LA | 4–1 | **Poche'** (1–0) | Morovick (0–1) | **Stallings** (1) | 11,122 | 1–0 | |
| February 14 | Kansas | #4 | Alex Box Stadium • Baton Rouge, LA | 8–5 | **Lange** (1–0) | Krauth (0–1) | | 10,903 | 2–0 | |
| February 15 | Kansas | #4 | Alex Box Stadium • Baton Rouge, LA | 7–4 | **Devall** (1–0) | Gilbert (0–1) | **Stallings** (2) | 10,703 | 3–0 | |
| February 18 | Nicholls State | #4 | Alex Box Stadium • Baton Rouge, LA | 3–6 | Ernestine (1–0) | **Norman** (0–1) | Holmes (2) | 10,271 | 3–1 | |
| February 20 | Boston College | #4 | Alex Box Stadium • Baton Rouge, LA | 8–3 | **Poche'** (2–0) | Gorman (0–1) | | 10,389 | 4–1 | |
| February 20 | Boston College | #4 | Alex Box Stadium • Baton Rouge, LA | 7–4 | **Lange** (2–0) | Burke (0–1) | **Stallings** (3) | 10,582 | 5–1 | |
| February 21 | Boston College | #4 | Alex Box Stadium • Baton Rouge, LA | 16–2 | **Godfrey** (1–0) | Poore (0–1) | | 11,118 | 6–1 | |
| February 26 | Southeastern Louisiana | #3 | Alex Box Stadium • Baton Rouge, LA | 9–8 | **Strall** (1–0) | Cashman (0–2) | **Stallings** (4) | 10,069 | 7–1 | |
| February 27 | Princeton | #3 | Alex Box Stadium • Baton Rouge, LA | 3–2 | **Poche'** (3–0) | Powers (0–1) | **Stallings** (5) | 10,006 | 8–1 | |
| February 28 | Princeton | #3 | Alex Box Stadium • Baton Rouge, LA | 7–2 | **Godfrey** (2–0) | Strieber (0–1) | | 11,151 | 9–1 | |
| February 28 | Princeton | #3 | Alex Box Stadium • Baton Rouge, LA | 15–4 | **Lange** (3–0) | Smithers (0–1) | | 10,214 | 10–1 | |

March

| Date | Opponent | Rank | Site/stadium | Score | Win | Loss | Save | Attendance | Overall record | SEC record |
|---|---|---|---|---|---|---|---|---|---|---|
| March 3 | Stephen F. Austin | #3 | Alex Box Stadium • Baton Rouge, LA | 8–1 | **Newman** (1–0) | Polivka (0–1) | | 9,581 | 11–1 | |
| March 4 | Grambling State | #3 | Alex Box Stadium • Baton Rouge, LA | 7–1 | **Norman** (1–1) | Mckinney (1–1) | | 9,502 | 12–1 | |
| March 6 | vs. #12 Houston | #3 | Minute Maid Park • Houston, TX | 4–2 | **Poche'** (4–0) | Lantrip (3–1) | **Stallings** (6) | 10,651 | 13–1 | |
| March 7 | vs. Baylor | #3 | Minute Maid Park • Houston, TX | 2–0 | **Lange** (4–0) | Castano (0–2) | **Stallings** (7) | 16,276 | 14–1 | |
| March 8 | vs. Nebraska | #3 | Minute Maid Park • Houston, TX | 4–2 | **Godfrey** (3–0) | Burkamper (1–1) | **Bugg** (1) | 10,866 | 15–1 | – |
| March 11 | McNeese State | #2 | Alex Box Stadium • Baton Rouge, LA | 7–0 | **Reynolds** (1–0) | Stremmel (2–1) | | 9,684 | 16–1 | |
| March 13 | Ole Miss | #2 | Alex Box Stadium • Baton Rouge, LA | 6–4 | **Poche'** (5–0) | Trent (3–1) | **Stallings** (8) | 11,668 | 17–1 | 1–0 |
| March 14 | Ole Miss | #2 | Alex Box Stadium • Baton Rouge, LA | 3–5 ^{(14)} | Short (3–1) | **Bouman** (0–1) | Stokes (3) | 12,164 | 17–2 | 1–1 |
| March 15 | Ole Miss | #2 | Alex Box Stadium • Baton Rouge, LA | 18–6 | **Godfrey** (4–0) | Smith (1–3) | | 11,148 | 18–2 | 2–1 |
| March 17 | at Southern | #3 | Lee–Hines Field • Baton Rouge, LA | 4–2 ^{(10)} | **Strall** (2–0) | Diaz (1–1) | **Stallings** (9) | 1,180 | 19–2 | |
| March 19 | at Arkansas | #3 | Baum Stadium • Fayetteville, AR | 1–5 | Taccolini (4–2) | **Poche'** (5–1) | Jackson (1) | 7,304 | 19–3 | 2–2 |
| March 20 | at Arkansas | #3 | Baum Stadium • Fayetteville, AR | 16–3 | **Lange** (5–0) | Teague (0–1) | | 8,178 | 20–3 | 3–2 |
| March 21 | at Arkansas | #3 | Baum Stadium • Fayetteville, AR | 7–4 | **Godfrey** (5–0) | Killian (0–1) | **Stallings** (10) | 9,734 | 21–3 | 4–2 |
| March 24 | at Tulane | #2 | Greer Field • New Orleans, LA | 13–7 | **Newman** (2–0) | Duester (3–2) | | 4,994 | 22–3 | |
| March 27 | Kentucky | #2 | Alex Box Stadium • Baton Rouge, LA | 4–5 ^{(12)} | Strecker (2–0) | **Stallings** (0–1) | Jack (4) | 11,118 | 22–4 | 4–3 |
| March 28 | Kentucky | #2 | Alex Box Stadium • Baton Rouge, LA | 7–3 | **Person** (1–0) | Nelson (2–1) | | 11,516 | 23–4 | 5–3 |
| March 29 | Kentucky | #2 | Alex Box Stadium • Baton Rouge, LA | 10–12 ^{(11)} | Jack (1–0) | **Bugg** (0–1) | | 10,732 | 23–5 | 5–4 |
| March 31 | vs. Louisiana–Lafayette | #5 | Zephyr Field • Metairie, LA | 8–6 | **Reynolds** (2–0) | Toups (1–2) | **Stallings** (11) | 10,853 | 24–5 | |

April

| Date | Opponent | Rank | Site/stadium | Score | Win | Loss | Save | Attendance | Overall record | SEC record |
|---|---|---|---|---|---|---|---|---|---|---|
| April 2 | at Alabama | #5 | Hoover Metropolitan Stadium • Hoover, AL | 8–5 ^{(16)} | **Norman** (2–1) | Wilhite (0–1) | | 4,117 | 25–5 | 6–4 |
| April 3 | at Alabama | #5 | Hoover Metropolitan Stadium • Hoover, AL | 6–2 | **Lange** (6–0) | Carter (1–4) | | 3,963 | 26–5 | 7–4 |
| April 4 | at Alabama | #5 | Hoover Metropolitan Stadium • Hoover, AL | 6–4 ^{(13)} | **Stallings** (1–1) | Burrows (0–3) | | 5,381 | 27–5 | 8–4 |
| April 7 | New Orleans | #4 | Alex Box Stadium • Baton Rouge, LA | 11–2 | **Reynolds** (3–0) | Kelleher (1–4) | | 10,837 | 28–5 | |
| April 8 | Northwestern State | #4 | Alex Box Stadium • Baton Rouge, LA | 9–6 | **Godfrey** (6–0) | Tidwell (2–3) | | 10,676 | 29–5 | |
| April 10 | Auburn | #4 | Alex Box Stadium • Baton Rouge, LA | 3–2 | **Poche'** (6–1) | Lipscomb (4–1) | **Newman** (1) | 10,064 | 30–5 | 9–4 |
| April 11 | Auburn | #4 | Alex Box Stadium • Baton Rouge, LA | 1–6 | Thompson (7–2) | **Bain** (0–1) | | 10,743 | 30–6 | 9–5 |
| April 12 | Auburn | #4 | Alex Box Stadium • Baton Rouge, LA | 6–2 | **Person** (2–0) | McCord (2–3) | | 10,037 | 31–6 | 10–5 |
| April 15 | Lamar | #3 | Alex Box Stadium • Baton Rouge, LA | 11–2 | **Bouman** (1–1) | Love (0–1) | | 9,947 | 32–6 | |
| April 18 | at Georgia | #3 | Foley Field • Athens, GA | 4–1 | **Lange** (7–0) | Lawlor (4–5) | **Newman** (2) | | 33–6 | 11–5 |
| April 18 | at Georgia | #3 | Foley Field • Athens, GA | 9–1 | **Poche'** (7–1) | McLaughlin (3–3) | | 3,138 | 34–6 | 12–5 |
| April 19 | at Georgia | #3 | Foley Field • Athens, GA | Cancelled | | | | | | |
| April 21 | Tulane | #1 | Alex Box Stadium • Baton Rouge, LA | 6–0 | **Bain** (1–1) | Duester (4–4) | | 10,614 | 35–6 | |
| April 23 | #4 Texas A&M | #1 | Alex Box Stadium • Baton Rouge, LA | 4–3 | **Strall** (3–0) | Vinson (3–1) | | 10,822 | 36–6 | 13–5 |
| April 24 | #4 Texas A&M | #1 | Alex Box Stadium • Baton Rouge, LA | 9–6 | **Reynolds** (4–0) | Hendrix (3–1) | **Newman** (3) | 12,042 | 37–6 | 14–5 |
| April 25 | #4 Texas A&M | #1 | Alex Box Stadium • Baton Rouge, LA | 2–6 | Simonds (3–1) | **Bain** (1–2) | Vinson (3) | 11,489 | 37–7 | 14–6 |
| April 28 | Alcorn State | #1 | Alex Box Stadium • Baton Rouge, LA | 6–1 | **Norman** (3–1) | Morales (0–5) | | 10,185 | 38–7 | |
| April 30 | at Mississippi State | #1 | Dudy Noble Field • Starkville, MS | 5–3 ^{(14)} | **Godfrey** (7–0) | Fitts (2–4) | **Stallings** (12) | 7,251 | 39–7 | 15–6 |

May

| Date | Opponent | Rank | Site/stadium | Score | Win | Loss | Save | Attendance | Overall record | SEC record |
|---|---|---|---|---|---|---|---|---|---|---|
| May 1 | at Mississippi State | #1 | Dudy Noble Field • Starkville, MS | 11–4 | **Lange** (8–0) | Brown (5–6) | **Newman** (4) | 8,293 | 40–7 | 16–6 |
| May 2 | at Mississippi State | #1 | Dudy Noble Field • Starkville, MS | 7–8 ^{(12)} | Hudson (1–0) | **Bugg** (0–2) | | 8,480 | 40–8 | 16–7 |
| May 8 | Missouri | #1 | Alex Box Stadium • Baton Rouge, LA | 8–3 | **Norman** (4–1) | McClain (6–6) | – | 11,009 | 41–8 | 17–7 |
| May 9 | Missouri | #1 | Alex Box Stadium • Baton Rouge, LA | 8–2 | **Lange** (9–0) | Houck (7–4) | | 11,386 | 42–8 | 18–7 |
| May 10 | Missouri | #1 | Alex Box Stadium • Baton Rouge, LA | 6–5 ^{(10)} | **Reynolds** (5–0) | Williams (4–3) | | 11,208 | 43–8 | 19–7 |
| May 12 | at New Orleans | #1 | Maestri Field • New Orleans, LA | 9–1 | **Devall** (2–0) | Kelleher (2–9) | | 2,380 | 44–8 | |
| May 14 | at South Carolina | #1 | Carolina Stadium • Columbia, SC | 7–10 | Scott (2–3) | **Godfrey** (7–1) | | 7,507 | 44–9 | 19–8 |
| May 15 | at South Carolina | #1 | Carolina Stadium • Columbia, SC | 9–2 | **Bain** (2–2) | Schmidt (2–2) | | 8,242 | 45–9 | 20–8 |
| May 16 | at South Carolina | #1 | Carolina Stadium • Columbia, SC | 8–1 | **Lange** (10–0) | Widener (1–5) | | 8.242 | 46–9 | 21–8 |

Postseason
SEC Tournament

| Date | Opponent | Rank | Site/stadium | Score | Win | Loss | Save | Attendance | Overall record | SECT Record |
|---|---|---|---|---|---|---|---|---|---|---|
| May 20 | vs. Auburn | #1 | Hoover Metropolitan Stadium • Hoover, AL | 9–8 | **Norman** (5–1) | Wingenter (1–6) | **Bugg** (2) | | 47–9 | 1–0 |
| May 21 | vs. #30 Arkansas | #1 | Hoover Metropolitan Stadium • Hoover, AL | 10–5 | **Reynolds** (6–0) | Teague (4–4) | | 8,361 | 48–9 | 2–0 |
| May 23 | vs. #9 Florida | #1 | Hoover Metropolitan Stadium • Hoover, AL | 1–2 | Lewis (6–1) | **Stallings** (1–2) | | 10,949 | 48–10 | 2–1 |

NCAA tournament: Regionals

| Date | Opponent | Rank | Site/stadium | Score | Win | Loss | Save | Attendance | Overall record | NCAAT Record |
|---|---|---|---|---|---|---|---|---|---|---|
| May 29 | Lehigh | (2) | Alex Box Stadium • Baton Rouge, LA | 10–3 | **Newman** (3–0) | Boswick (3–4) | | 10,945 | 49–10 | 1–0 |
| May 30 | UNC Wilmington | (2) | Alex Box Stadium • Baton Rouge, LA | 2–0 | **Lange** (11–0) | Phillips (2–2) | | 11,251 | 50–10 | 2–0 |
| June 1 | UNC Wilmington | (2) | Alex Box Stadium • Baton Rouge, LA | 2–0 | **Poche'** (8–1) | Crump (1–2) | **Bugg** (3) | 11,301 | 51–10 | 3–0 |

NCAA tournament: Super Regionals

| Date | Opponent | Rank | Site/stadium | Score | Win | Loss | Save | Attendance | Overall record | NCAAT Record |
|---|---|---|---|---|---|---|---|---|---|---|
| June 6 | Louisiana–Lafayette | (2) | Alex Box Stadium • Baton Rouge, LA | 4–3 | **Bugg** (1–2) | Bacon (6–3) | | 11,179 | 52–10 | 4–0 |
| June 7 | Louisiana–Lafayette | (2) | Alex Box Stadium • Baton Rouge, LA | 6–3 | **Poche'** (9–1) | Leger (6–5) | | 11,795 | 53–10 | 5–0 |

College World Series

| Date | Opponent | Rank | Site/stadium | Score | Win | Loss | Save | Attendance | Overall record | NCAAT Record |
|---|---|---|---|---|---|---|---|---|---|---|
| June 14 | (7) TCU | (2) | TD Ameritrade Park Omaha • Omaha, NE | 3–10 | Morrison (12–3) | **Poche'** (9–2) | | 24,506 | 53–11 | 5-1 |
| June 16 | Cal State Fullerton | (2) | TD Ameritrade Park Omaha • Omaha, NE | 5–3 | **Lange** (12–0) | Seabold (5–4) | | 18,751 | 54–11 | 6-1 |
| June 18 | (7) TCU | (2) | TD Ameritrade Park Omaha • Omaha, NE | 4–8 | Teakell (3–1) | **Bain** (2–3) | | 26,803 | 54–12 | 6-2 |

All rankings from Collegiate Baseball.

== Record vs. conference opponents ==
Last two do not qualify for conf. tourn. Blank are not scheduled. Blue are home games, otherwise away.

2015 SEC baseball records Source: 2015 SEC baseball game results
| Team | W–L | ALA | ARK | AUB | FLA | UGA | KEN | LSU | MSU | MIZZ | MISS | SCAR | TENN | TAMU | VAN | Team | Div | SR | SW |
|---|---|---|---|---|---|---|---|---|---|---|---|---|---|---|---|---|---|---|---|
| ALA | 12–18 | | 0–3 | 3–0 | 1–2 | 2–1 | . | 0–3 | 2–1 | 1–2 | 1–2 | . | . | 1–2 | 1–2 | ALA | W6 | 3–7 | 1–2 |
| ARK | 17–12 | 3–0 | | 2–1 | . | 2–1 | 2–1 | 1–2 | 2–1 | . | 2–1 | . | 1–1 | 2–1 | 0–3 | ARK | W3 | 7–2 | 1–1 |
| AUB | 13–17 | 0–3 | 1–2 | | 1–2 | 3–0 | . | 1–2 | 2–1 | . | 2–1 | 2–1 | . | 0–3 | 1–2 | AUB | W5 | 4–6 | 1–2 |
| FLA | 19–11 | 2–1 | . | 2–1 | | 2–1 | 1–2 | . | 3–0 | 1–2 | 1–2 | 3–0 | 2–1 | . | 2–1 | FLA | E2 | 7–3 | 2–0 |
| UGA | 10–19 | 1–2 | 1–2 | 0–3 | 1–2 | | 2–1 | 0–2 | . | 0–3 | . | 2–1 | 3–0 | . | 0–3 | UGA | E7 | 3–7 | 1–3 |
| KEN | 14–15 | . | 1–2 | . | 2–1 | 1–2 | | 2–1 | 2–1 | 2–1 | . | 0–3 | 3–0 | 0–2 | 1–2 | KEN | E4 | 5–5 | 1–1 |
| LSU | 21–8 | 3–0 | 2–1 | 2–1 | . | 2–0 | 1–2 | | 2–1 | 3–0 | 2–1 | 2–1 | . | 2–1 | . | LSU | W1 | 9–1 | 2–0 |
| MSU | 8–22 | 1–2 | 1–2 | 1–2 | 0–3 | . | 1–2 | 1–2 | | . | 0–3 | 2–1 | 0–3 | 1–2 | . | MSU | W7 | 1–9 | 0–3 |
| MIZZ | 15–15 | 2–1 | . | . | 2–1 | 3–0 | 1–2 | 0–3 | . | | 2–1 | 2–1 | 2–1 | 1–2 | 0–3 | MIZZ | E3 | 6–4 | 1–2 |
| MISS | 15–14 | 2–1 | 1–2 | 1–2 | 2–1 | . | . | 1–2 | 3–0 | 1–2 | | . | 1–2 | 1–1 | 2–1 | MISS | W4 | 4–5 | 1–0 |
| SCAR | 13–17 | . | . | 1–2 | 0–3 | 1–2 | 3–0 | 1–2 | 1–2 | 1–2 | . | | 1–2 | 2–1 | 2–1 | SCAR | E5 | 3–7 | 1–1 |
| TENN | 11–18 | . | 1–1 | . | 1–2 | 0–3 | 0–3 | . | 3–0 | 1–2 | 2–1 | 2–1 | | 0–3 | 1–2 | TENN | E6 | 3–6 | 1–3 |
| TAMU | 18–10 | 2–1 | 1–2 | 3–0 | . | . | 2–0 | 1–2 | 2–1 | 2–1 | 1–1 | 1–2 | 3–0 | | . | TAMU | W2 | 6–3 | 2–0 |
| VAN | 20–10 | 2–1 | 3–0 | 2–1 | 1–2 | 3–0 | 2–1 | . | . | 3–0 | 1–2 | 1–2 | 2–1 | . | | VAN | E1 | 7–3 | 3–0 |
| Team | W–L | ALA | ARK | AUB | FLA | UGA | KEN | LSU | MSU | MIZZ | MISS | SCAR | TENN | TAMU | VAN | Team | Div | SR | SW |

Updated for entire regular season.

== Rankings ==
Ranking movements Legend: ██ Increase in ranking ██ Decrease in ranking
| | Week | | | | | | | | | | | | | | | | | | |
| Poll | Pre | 1 | 2 | 3 | 4 | 5 | 6 | 7 | 8 | 9 | 10 | 11 | 12 | 13 | 14 | 15 | 16 | 17 | Final |
|---|---|---|---|---|---|---|---|---|---|---|---|---|---|---|---|---|---|---|---|
| Coaches' | 4 | 4* | 4* | 5 | 4 | 2 | 1 | 4 | 3 | 2 | 1 | 1 | 1 | 1 | 1 | 1 | 1* | 1* | |
| Baseball America | 2 | 2 | 2 | 2 | 1 | 1 | 1 | 3 | 3 | 2 | 1 | 1 | 1 | 1 | 1 | 1 | 1* | 1* | |
| Collegiate Baseball^ | 4 | 4 | 3 | 3 | 2 | 3 | 2 | 5 | 4 | 3 | 1 | 1 | 1 | 1 | 1 | 1 | 1 | 1 | |
| NCBWA† | 4 | 4 | 4 | 4 | 3 | 2 | 1 | 5 | 3 | 2 | 1 | 1 | 1 | 1 | 1 | 1 | 1 | 1* | |

^ Collegiate Baseball ranked 40 teams in their preseason poll, but only ranked 30 teams weekly during the season.
† NCBWA ranks 30 teams in their preseason poll, but only ranks 25 teams weekly during the season.
* A new poll was not released for this week, so for comparison purposes, the previous week's ranking is inserted in this week's slot.

== Awards and honors ==
Paul Mainieri

- SEC Coach of the Year
- NCBWA Coach of the Year

Alex Bregman

- Louisville Slugger Pre-season Second team All-American
- Perfect Game USA Pre-season First team All-American
- Baseball America Pre-season First team All-American
- First team All-SEC
- SEC All-Defensive Team
- Louisville Slugger First team All-American
- Baseball America First team All-American

Chris Chinea

- Second team All-SEC
- Louisville Slugger Third team All-American
- NCAA Baton Rouge Regional All-Tournament Team

Jared Foster

- SEC All-Tournament Team

Conner Hale

- First team All-SEC
- NCAA Baton Rouge Regional All-Tournament Team

Mark Laird

- SEC All-Defensive Team

Alex Lange

- SEC Freshman of the Year
- First team All-SEC
- Louisville Slugger First team All-American
- NCAA Baton Rouge Regional All-Tournament Team
- Most Outstanding Player, NCAA Baton Rouge Regional
- NCBWA Freshman All-American
- NCBWA Freshman Pitcher of the Year
- Baseball America First team All-American

Jared Poche'

- Louisville Slugger Pre-season Second team All-American

Kade Scivicque

- First team All-SEC
- SEC All-Defensive Team
- Louisville Slugger Second team All-American
- Baseball America Second team All-American

Jesse Stallings

- NCBWA Freshman All-American

Andrew Stevenson

- First team All-SEC
- SEC All-Defensive Team
- NCAA Baton Rouge Regional All-Tournament Team
- Baseball America Third team All-American
