= 2015 Arkansas Razorbacks baseball team =

American college baseball team

2015 Arkansas Razorbacks baseball
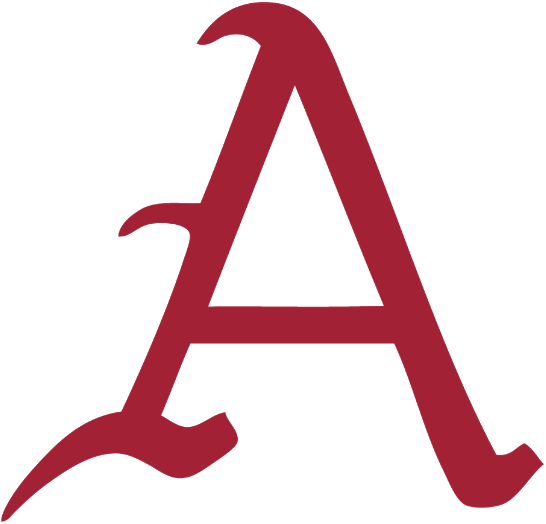

Fayetteville Super Regional champions Stillwater Regional champions

College World Series, T-7th
- Conference: Southeastern Conference
- West
- Record: 40–25 (17–12 SEC)
- Head coach: Dave Van Horn
- Hitting coach: Tony Vitello
- Pitching coach: Dave Jorn
- Home stadium: Baum Stadium

2015 Southeastern Conference baseball standings
	Conf.				Overall
Team	W		L	PCT	W		L	PCT
Eastern
No. 2 Vanderbilt ^{x}‍‍‍^{y}	20	–	10	.667	51	–	21	.708
No. 3 Florida ‍‍‡‍^{y}	19	–	11	.633	52	–	18	.743
Missouri ‍‍‍	15	–	15	.500	30	–	28	.517
Kentucky ‍‍‍	14	–	15	.483	30	–	25	.545
South Carolina ‍‍‍	13	–	17	.433	32	–	25	.561
Tennessee ‍‍‍	11	–	18	.379	24	–	26	.480
Georgia ‍‍‍	10	–	19	.345	26	–	28	.481
Western
No. 5 LSU ^{x}‍†‍‍^{y}	21	–	8	.724	54	–	12	.818
No. 11 Texas A&M ‍‍‍^{y}	18	–	10	.643	50	–	14	.781
No. 7 Arkansas ‍‍‍^{y}	17	–	12	.586	40	–	25	.615
Ole Miss ‍‍‍^{y}	15	–	14	.517	30	–	28	.517
Auburn ‍‍‍^{y}	13	–	17	.433	36	–	26	.581
Alabama ‍‍‍	12	–	18	.400	32	–	28	.533
Mississippi State ‍‍‍	8	–	22	.267	24	–	30	.444
x – Division champion † – Conference champion ‡ – Tournament champion y – Invited to the NCAA tournament Rankings from Collegiate Baseball

The 2015 Arkansas Razorbacks baseball team represented the University of Arkansas in baseball at the Division I level in the NCAA for the 2015 season. Dave van Horn was the coach and finished his thirteenth year at his alma mater.

Arkansas advanced to the 2015 College World Series for the eighth time in school history and fourth time under Van Horn.

== Schedule and results ==
Legend
	Arkansas win
	Arkansas loss
	Postponement
**Bold**	Arkansas team member

2015 Arkansas Razorbacks baseball game log
Regular season

February
Date	Opponent	Site/stadium	Score	Win	Loss	Save	Attendance	Overall record	SEC record
February 13	North Dakota	Baum Stadium • Fayetteville, AR	**W** 11–4	**Chadwick (1–0)**	Thome (0–1)	None	7,016	1–0	
February 14	North Dakota	Baum Stadium • Fayetteville, AR	**W** 13–2	**Taccolini (1–0)**	Muckenhirn (0–1)	None	DH	2–0	
February 14	North Dakota	Baum Stadium • Fayetteville, AR	**W** 12–1	**Jackson (1–0)**	Twenge (0–1)	None	9,557	3–0	
February 20	vs UCF	Eddie Stanky Field • Mobile, AL	**L** 5–9	Hukari (1–0)	**Taccolini (1–1)**	Davis (2)		3–1	
February 21	at South Alabama	Eddie Stanky Field • Mobile, AL	**W** 7–0	**Lowery (1–0)**	Long (0–1)	None	1,884	4–1	
February 22	vs Maryland	Eddie Stanky Field • Mobile, AL	**L** 6–13	Ruse (2–0)	**Stone (0–1)**	None		4–2	

March
Date	Opponent	Site/stadium	Score	Win	Loss	Save	Attendance	Overall record	SEC record
March 2	Eastern Illinois	Baum Stadium • Fayetteville, AR	**W** 4–1	**Taccolini (2–1)**	Wivinis (0–1)	**Stone (1)**	DH	5–2	
March 2	Eastern Illinois	Baum Stadium • Fayetteville, AR	**W** 8–1	**Alberius (1–0)**	Stenger (0–2)	None	6,912	6–2	
March 3	Eastern Illinois	Baum Stadium • Fayetteville, AR	**W** 7–0	**McKinney (1–0)**	Fisher (0–1)	None	6,643	7–2	
March 6	Loyola Marymount	Baum Stadium • Fayetteville, AR	**W** 2–1	**Jackson (2–0)**	Welmon (2–2)	None	6,523	8–2	
March 7	Loyola Marymount	Baum Stadium • Fayetteville, AR	**W** 13–7	**Taccolini (3–1)**	Megill (1–2)	None	8,308	9–2	
March 8	Loyola Marymount	Baum Stadium • Fayetteville, AR	**L** 0–9	Megill (3–1)	**McKinney (1–1)**	None	7,051	9–3	
March 10	Gonzaga	Baum Stadium • Fayetteville, AR	**L** 2–6	LeBrun (2–2)	**Alberius (1–1)**	None	6,889	9–4	
March 11	Gonzaga	Baum Stadium • Fayetteville, AR	**L** 5–15	Frost (1–2)	**Sanburn (0–1)**	None	7,112	9–5	
March 14	at #2 Vanderbilt	Hawkins Stadium • Nashville, TN	**L** 7–8 (12)	Bowden (3–1)	**Stone (0–2)**	None	DH	9–6	0–1
March 14	at #2 Vanderbilt	Hawkins Stadium • Nashville, TN	**L** 1–9	Buehler (1–0)	**Taccolini (3–2)**	Kilichowski (1)	3,040	9–7	0–2
March 15	at #2 Vanderbilt	Hawkins Stadium • Nashville, TN	**L** 0–1	Pfeifer (2–1)	**Alberius (1–2)**	None	3,150	9–8	0–3
March 17	Southeast Missouri State	Baum Stadium • Fayetteville, AR	**W** 4–3	**Stone (1–2)**	Wright (0–2)	None	7,027	10–8	
March 18	Southeast Missouri State	Baum Stadium • Fayetteville, AR	**L** 11–12	Mosel (1–1)	**Phillips (0–1)**	Winkelman (1)	6,583	10–9	
March 19	#3 LSU	Baum Stadium • Fayetteville, AR	**W** 5–1	**Taccolini (4–2)**	Poche (5–1)	**Jackson (1)**	7,304	11–9	1–3
March 20	#3 LSU	Baum Stadium • Fayetteville, AR	**L** 3–16	Lange (5–0)	**Teague (0–1)**	None	8,178	11–10	1–4
March 21	#3 LSU	Baum Stadium • Fayetteville, AR	**L** 4–7	Godfrey (5–0)	**Killian (0–1)**	Stallings (10)	9,734	11–11	1–5
March 24	Memphis	Dickey-Stephens Park • Little Rock, AR	**L** 4–5	Caufield (3–0)	**Phillips (0–2)**	None	7,929	11–12	
March 25	at Memphis	FedExPark • Memphis, TN	**W** 7–3	**Teague (1–1)**	Garner (0–1)	None	3,673	12–12	
March 26	Ole Miss	Baum Stadium • Fayetteville, AR	**W** 10–3	**Taccolini (5–2)**	Trent (4–2)	None	7,168	13–12	2–5
March 27	Ole Miss	Baum Stadium • Fayetteville, AR	**L** 4–5	Bramlett (4–1)	**Killian (0–2)**	Short (3)	7,855	13–13	2–6
March 28	Ole Miss	Baum Stadium • Fayetteville, AR	**W** 5–2	**Lowery (2–0)**	Stokes (0–2)	**Jackson (2)**	9,679	14–13	3–6
March 31	Missouri State	Baum Stadium • Fayetteville, AR	**L** 0–2	Cheray (3–2)	**Teague (1–2)**	Young (4)	7,364	14–14	

April
Date	Opponent	Site/stadium	Score	Win	Loss	Save	Attendance	Overall record	SEC record
April 3	at Auburn	Plainsman Park • Auburn, AL	**W** 10–7	**Jackson (3–0)**	Wingenter (1–4)	None	3,379	15–14	4–6
April 4	at Auburn	Plainsman Park • Auburn, AL	**L** 4–5	Thompson (6–2)	**Phillips (0–3)**	None	2,949	15–15	4–7
April 5	at Auburn	Plainsman Park • Auburn, AL	**W** 6–4	**Lowery (3–0)**	Rentz (1–1)	**Jackson (3)**	2,490	16–15	5–7
April 7	Mississippi Valley State	Baum Stadium • Fayetteville, AR	**W** 8–1	**Stone (2–2)**	Case (3–4)	None	6,822	17–15	
April 8	Mississippi Valley State	Baum Stadium • Fayetteville, AR	**W** 14–0	**Teague (2–2)**	Thomas (1–7)	None	6,813	18–15	
April 10	Kentucky	Baum Stadium • Fayetteville, AR	**W** 5–3	**Killian (1–2)**	Brown (2–4)	**Jackson (4)**	9,217	19–15	6–7
April 11	Kentucky	Baum Stadium • Fayetteville, AR	**L** 4–16	Beggs (4–2)	**Taccolini (5–3)**	None	9,874	19–16	6–8
April 12	Kentucky	Baum Stadium • Fayetteville, AR	**W** 7–3	**McKinney (2–1)**	Cody (2–4)	None	7,578	20–16	7–8
April 14	Stephen F. Austin	Baum Stadium • Fayetteville, AR	**W** 8–2	**Teague (3–2)**	Day (0–2)	None	7,130	21–16	
April 15	Stephen F. Austin	Baum Stadium • Fayetteville, AR	**W** 15–3	**Stone (3–2)**	Polivka (1–3)	None	7,071	22–16	
April 18	at #1 Texas A&M	Olsen Field at Blue Bell Park • College Station, TX	**L** 6–13	Long (8–0)	**Killian (1–3)**	None	6,003	22–17	7–9
April 19	at #1 Texas A&M	Olsen Field at Blue Bell Park • College Station, TX	**W** 9–8	**Lowery (4–0)**	Ecker (0–1)	**Teague (1)**	7,201	23–17	8–9
April 19	at #1 Texas A&M	Olsen Field at Blue Bell Park • College Station, TX	**W** 8–2	**McKinney (3–1)**	Kent (6–1)	None	6,156	24–17	9–9
April 24	Mississippi State	Baum Stadium • Fayetteville, AR	**W** 7–6	**Jackson (4–0)**	Fitts (2–3)	None	8,312	25–17	10–9
April 25	Mississippi State	Baum Stadium • Fayetteville, AR	**W** 6–1	**Taccolini (6–3)**	Brown (5–5)	None	12,589	26–17	11–9
April 26	Mississippi State	Baum Stadium • Fayetteville, AR	**L** 1–2	Sexton (4–4)	**Lowery (4–1)**	Houston (1)	8,566	26–18	11–10
April 30	at Alabama	Hoover Metropolitan Stadium • Hoover, AL	**W** 5–1	**Killian (2–3)**	Guilbeau (2–5)	**Jackson (5)**	2,602	27–18	12–10

May
Date	Opponent	Site/stadium	Score	Win	Loss	Save	Attendance	Overall record	SEC record
May 1	at Alabama	Hoover Metropolitan Stadium • Hoover, AL	**W** 8–4	**Lowery (5–1)**	Walters (4–3)	**Teague (2)**	3,343	28–18	13–10
May 2	at Alabama	Hoover Metropolitan Stadium • Hoover, AL	**W** 4–0	**McKinney (4–1)**	Bramblett (6–3)	None	3,413	29–18	14–10
May 8	Tennessee	Baum Stadium • Fayetteville, AR	**L** 4–5	Cox (2–3)	**Teague (3–3)**	Lee (8)	9,344	29–19	14–11
May 10	Tennessee	Baum Stadium • Fayetteville, AR	**W** 5–2 (7)	**McKinney (5–1)**	Martin (1–3)	**Taccolini (1)**	7,656	30–19	15–11
May 12	at Creighton	TD Ameritrade Park Omaha • Omaha, NE	**W** 6–2	**Phillips (1–3)**	Highberger (5–2)	**Taccolini (2)**	3,102	31–19	
May 14	at Georgia	Foley Field • Athens, GA	**L** 1–10	Sosebee (4–3)	**Killian (2–4)**	None	2,200	31–20	15–12
May 15	at Georgia	Foley Field • Athens, GA	**W** 9–0	**McKinney (6–1)**	Lawlor (5–7)	None	2,688	32–20	16–12
May 16	at Georgia	Foley Field • Athens, GA	**W** 8–1	**Teague (4–3)**	Tyler (1–1)	None	2,311	33–20	17–12

Postseason

SEC Tournament
Date	Opponent	Site/stadium	Score	Win	Loss	Save	Attendance	Overall record	SECT Record
May 19	vs Tennessee	Hoover Metropolitan Stadium • Hoover, AL	**W** 2–1	**Jackson (5–0)**	Lee (4–2)	None	5,761	34–20	1–0
May 20	vs #9 Florida	Hoover Metropolitan Stadium • Hoover, AL	**W** 7–6	**Lowery (6–1)**	Poyner (4–2)	**Jackson (6)**	10,142	35–20	2–0
May 21	vs #1 LSU	Hoover Metropolitan Stadium • Hoover, AL	**L** 5–10	Reynolds (6–0)	**Teague (4–4)**	None	8,361	35–21	2–1
May 22	vs Florida	Hoover Metropolitan Stadium • Hoover, AL	**L** 0–10	Puk (8–4)	**Taccolini (6–4)**	None	10,329	35–22	2–2

Stillwater Regional
Date	Opponent	Site/stadium	Score	Win	Loss	Save	Attendance	Overall record	NCAAT record
May 29	vs. (3) Oral Roberts	Allie P. Reynolds Stadium • Stillwater, OK	**W** 8–6	**Lowery (7–1)**	Trujillo (10–4)	**Alberius (1)**	3,286	36–22	1–0
May 30	vs. (1) Oklahoma State	Allie P. Reynolds Stadium • Stillwater, OK	**W** 7–5	**Teague (5–4)**	Freeman (10–3)	**Jackson (7)**	3,831	37–22	2–0
May 31	vs. (4) St. John's	Allie P. Reynolds Stadium • Stillwater, OK	**W** 4–3	**Teague (6–4)**	Kuzia (3–2)	**Jackson (8)**	3,198	38–22	3–0

Fayetteville Super Regional
Date	Opponent	Site/stadium	Score	Win	Loss	Save	Attendance	Overall record	NCAAT record
June 5	(8) Missouri State	Baum Stadium • Fayetteville, AR	**W** 18–4	**Killian (3–4)**	Harris (8–2)	None	11,869	39–22	4–0
June 6	(8) Missouri State	Baum Stadium • Fayetteville, AR	**L** 1–3	Hall (12–2)	**McKinney (6–2)**	None	12,167	39–23	4–1
June 7	(8) Missouri State	Baum Stadium • Fayetteville, AR	**W** 3–2	**Phillips (2–3)**	Knutson (6–2)	**Jackson (9)**	11,694	40–23	5–1

College World Series
Date	Opponent	Site/stadium	Score	Win	Loss	Save	Attendance	Overall record	CWS record
June 13	Virginia	TD Ameritrade Park • Omaha, NE	**L** 3–5	Sborz (5–2)	**Killian (3–5)**	None	24,228	40–24	0–1
June 15	(5) Miami	TD Ameritrade Park • Omaha, NE	**L** 3–4	Garcia (6–2)	**Jackson (5–1)**	None	18,734	40–25	0–2

== Record vs. conference opponents ==
Last two do not qualify for conf. tourn. Blank are not scheduled. Blue are home games, otherwise away.

2015 SEC baseball records Source: 2015 SEC baseball game results
Team	W–L	ALA	ARK	AUB	FLA	UGA	KEN	LSU	MSU	MIZZ	MISS	SCAR	TENN	TAMU	VAN	Team	Div	SR	SW
ALA	12–18		0–3	3–0	1–2	2–1	.	0–3	2–1	1–2	1–2	.	.	1–2	1–2	ALA	W6	3–7	1–2
ARK	17–12	3–0		2–1	.	2–1	2–1	1–2	2–1	.	2–1	.	1–1	2–1	0–3	ARK	W3	7–2	1–1
AUB	13–17	0–3	1–2		1–2	3–0	.	1–2	2–1	.	2–1	2–1	.	0–3	1–2	AUB	W5	4–6	1–2
FLA	19–11	2–1	.	2–1		2–1	1–2	.	3–0	1–2	1–2	3–0	2–1	.	2–1	FLA	E2	7–3	2–0
UGA	10–19	1–2	1–2	0–3	1–2		2–1	0–2	.	0–3	.	2–1	3–0	.	0–3	UGA	E7	3–7	1–3
KEN	14–15	.	1–2	.	2–1	1–2		2–1	2–1	2–1	.	0–3	3–0	0–2	1–2	KEN	E4	5–5	1–1
LSU	21–8	3–0	2–1	2–1	.	2–0	1–2		2–1	3–0	2–1	2–1	.	2–1	.	LSU	W1	9–1	2–0
MSU	8–22	1–2	1–2	1–2	0–3	.	1–2	1–2		.	0–3	2–1	0–3	1–2	.	MSU	W7	1–9	0–3
MIZZ	15–15	2–1	.	.	2–1	3–0	1–2	0–3	.		2–1	2–1	2–1	1–2	0–3	MIZZ	E3	6–4	1–2
MISS	15–14	2–1	1–2	1–2	2–1	.	.	1–2	3–0	1–2		.	1–2	1–1	2–1	MISS	W4	4–5	1–0
SCAR	13–17	.	.	1–2	0–3	1–2	3–0	1–2	1–2	1–2	.		1–2	2–1	2–1	SCAR	E5	3–7	1–1
TENN	11–18	.	1–1	.	1–2	0–3	0–3	.	3–0	1–2	2–1	2–1		0–3	1–2	TENN	E6	3–6	1–3
TAMU	18–10	2–1	1–2	3–0	.	.	2–0	1–2	2–1	2–1	1–1	1–2	3–0		.	TAMU	W2	6–3	2–0
VAN	20–10	2–1	3–0	2–1	1–2	3–0	2–1	.	.	3–0	1–2	1–2	2–1	.		VAN	E1	7–3	3–0
Team	W–L	ALA	ARK	AUB	FLA	UGA	KEN	LSU	MSU	MIZZ	MISS	SCAR	TENN	TAMU	VAN	Team	Div	SR	SW

Updated for entire regular season.
