= 2015 Mississippi State Bulldogs baseball team =

NCAA Division I baseball team

2015 Mississippi State Bulldogs baseball
- Conference: Southeastern Conference
- West
- Record: 24–30 (8–22 SEC)
- Head coach: John Cohen (7th season)
- Assistant coaches: Butch Thompson (7th season); Nick Mingione (3rd season)
- Home stadium: Dudy Noble Field

2015 Southeastern Conference baseball standings
	Conf.				Overall
Team	W		L	PCT	W		L	PCT
Eastern
No. 2 Vanderbilt ^{x}‍‍‍^{y}	20	–	10	.667	51	–	21	.708
No. 3 Florida ‍‍‡‍^{y}	19	–	11	.633	52	–	18	.743
Missouri ‍‍‍	15	–	15	.500	30	–	28	.517
Kentucky ‍‍‍	14	–	15	.483	30	–	25	.545
South Carolina ‍‍‍	13	–	17	.433	32	–	25	.561
Tennessee ‍‍‍	11	–	18	.379	24	–	26	.480
Georgia ‍‍‍	10	–	19	.345	26	–	28	.481
Western
No. 5 LSU ^{x}‍†‍‍^{y}	21	–	8	.724	54	–	12	.818
No. 11 Texas A&M ‍‍‍^{y}	18	–	10	.643	50	–	14	.781
No. 7 Arkansas ‍‍‍^{y}	17	–	12	.586	40	–	25	.615
Ole Miss ‍‍‍^{y}	15	–	14	.517	30	–	28	.517
Auburn ‍‍‍^{y}	13	–	17	.433	36	–	26	.581
Alabama ‍‍‍	12	–	18	.400	32	–	28	.533
Mississippi State ‍‍‍	8	–	22	.267	24	–	30	.444
x – Division champion † – Conference champion ‡ – Tournament champion y – Invited to the NCAA tournament Rankings from Collegiate Baseball

The 2015 Mississippi State Bulldogs baseball team represented Mississippi State University in the 2015 season of NCAA Division I baseball.

== Pre-season ==
The 2015 MSU baseball team has Collegiate Baseball's No. 3 ranked recruiting class in 2015 according to Collegiate Baseball. This is the third straight top 10 class, following No. 2 in 2013 and No. 6 in 2014.

== Schedule and results ==
Game results and box scores can be found at the reference.

== Record vs. conference opponents ==
Last two do not qualify for conf. tourn. Blank are not scheduled. Blue are home games, otherwise away.

2015 SEC baseball records Source: 2015 SEC baseball game results
Team	W–L	ALA	ARK	AUB	FLA	UGA	KEN	LSU	MSU	MIZZ	MISS	SCAR	TENN	TAMU	VAN	Team	Div	SR	SW
ALA	12–18		0–3	3–0	1–2	2–1	.	0–3	2–1	1–2	1–2	.	.	1–2	1–2	ALA	W6	3–7	1–2
ARK	17–12	3–0		2–1	.	2–1	2–1	1–2	2–1	.	2–1	.	1–1	2–1	0–3	ARK	W3	7–2	1–1
AUB	13–17	0–3	1–2		1–2	3–0	.	1–2	2–1	.	2–1	2–1	.	0–3	1–2	AUB	W5	4–6	1–2
FLA	19–11	2–1	.	2–1		2–1	1–2	.	3–0	1–2	1–2	3–0	2–1	.	2–1	FLA	E2	7–3	2–0
UGA	10–19	1–2	1–2	0–3	1–2		2–1	0–2	.	0–3	.	2–1	3–0	.	0–3	UGA	E7	3–7	1–3
KEN	14–15	.	1–2	.	2–1	1–2		2–1	2–1	2–1	.	0–3	3–0	0–2	1–2	KEN	E4	5–5	1–1
LSU	21–8	3–0	2–1	2–1	.	2–0	1–2		2–1	3–0	2–1	2–1	.	2–1	.	LSU	W1	9–1	2–0
MSU	8–22	1–2	1–2	1–2	0–3	.	1–2	1–2		.	0–3	2–1	0–3	1–2	.	MSU	W7	1–9	0–3
MIZZ	15–15	2–1	.	.	2–1	3–0	1–2	0–3	.		2–1	2–1	2–1	1–2	0–3	MIZZ	E3	6–4	1–2
MISS	15–14	2–1	1–2	1–2	2–1	.	.	1–2	3–0	1–2		.	1–2	1–1	2–1	MISS	W4	4–5	1–0
SCAR	13–17	.	.	1–2	0–3	1–2	3–0	1–2	1–2	1–2	.		1–2	2–1	2–1	SCAR	E5	3–7	1–1
TENN	11–18	.	1–1	.	1–2	0–3	0–3	.	3–0	1–2	2–1	2–1		0–3	1–2	TENN	E6	3–6	1–3
TAMU	18–10	2–1	1–2	3–0	.	.	2–0	1–2	2–1	2–1	1–1	1–2	3–0		.	TAMU	W2	6–3	2–0
VAN	20–10	2–1	3–0	2–1	1–2	3–0	2–1	.	.	3–0	1–2	1–2	2–1	.		VAN	E1	7–3	3–0
Team	W–L	ALA	ARK	AUB	FLA	UGA	KEN	LSU	MSU	MIZZ	MISS	SCAR	TENN	TAMU	VAN	Team	Div	SR	SW

Updated for entire regular season.

== Rankings ==
Ranking movements Legend: ██ Increase in ranking ██ Decrease in ranking — = Not ranked
	Week																		
Poll	Pre	1	2	3	4	5	6	7	8	9	10	11	12	13	14	15	16	17	Final
Coaches'	25	25*	25*	7	13	20	—	—	—	—	—	—	—	—	—	—	—*	—*	—
Baseball America	14	13	9	15	20	—	—	—	—	—	—	—	—	—	—	—	—*	—*	—
Collegiate Baseball^	20	18	14	8	16	—	—	—	—	—	—	—	—	—	—	—	—	—	—
NCBWA†	22	20	15	9	15	22	29	—	—	—	—	—	—	—	—	—	—	—*	—

^ Collegiate Baseball ranked 40 teams in their preseason poll, but only ranked 30 teams weekly during the season.
† NCBWA ranks 30 teams in their preseason poll, but only ranks 25 teams weekly during the season.
* A new poll was not released for this week, so for comparison purposes, the previous week's ranking is inserted in this week's slot.

== MLB draft ==
No players were drafted.
