= 2015 South Carolina Gamecocks baseball team =

American college baseball season

2015 South Carolina Gamecocks baseball
- Conference: Southeastern Conference
- Record: 32–25 (13–17 SEC)
- Head coach: Chad Holbrook (3rd season)
- Assistant coaches: Jerry Meyers (5th/13th season); Sammy Esposito (8th season)
- Home stadium: Carolina Stadium

2015 Southeastern Conference baseball standings
	Conf.				Overall
Team	W		L	PCT	W		L	PCT
Eastern
No. 2 Vanderbilt ^{x}‍‍‍^{y}	20	–	10	.667	51	–	21	.708
No. 3 Florida ‍‍‡‍^{y}	19	–	11	.633	52	–	18	.743
Missouri ‍‍‍	15	–	15	.500	30	–	28	.517
Kentucky ‍‍‍	14	–	15	.483	30	–	25	.545
South Carolina ‍‍‍	13	–	17	.433	32	–	25	.561
Tennessee ‍‍‍	11	–	18	.379	24	–	26	.480
Georgia ‍‍‍	10	–	19	.345	26	–	28	.481
Western
No. 5 LSU ^{x}‍†‍‍^{y}	21	–	8	.724	54	–	12	.818
No. 11 Texas A&M ‍‍‍^{y}	18	–	10	.643	50	–	14	.781
No. 7 Arkansas ‍‍‍^{y}	17	–	12	.586	40	–	25	.615
Ole Miss ‍‍‍^{y}	15	–	14	.517	30	–	28	.517
Auburn ‍‍‍^{y}	13	–	17	.433	36	–	26	.581
Alabama ‍‍‍	12	–	18	.400	32	–	28	.533
Mississippi State ‍‍‍	8	–	22	.267	24	–	30	.444
x – Division champion † – Conference champion ‡ – Tournament champion y – Invited to the NCAA tournament Rankings from Collegiate Baseball

The 2015 South Carolina Gamecocks baseball team represented the University of South Carolina in the 2015 NCAA Division I baseball season. The Gamecocks played their home games in Carolina Stadium. The team was coached by Chad Holbrook, who was in his third season as head coach at Carolina.

== Personnel ==
=== Roster ===
2015 South Carolina Gamecocks active roster
Pitchers: 6 - Clarke Schmidt - Freshman; 9 - Brandon Murray - Freshman; 13 - Jack Wynkoop - Junior; 17 - Taylor Widener - Sophomore; 18 - - Tyler Haswell - Freshman; 21 - Tyler Johnson - Freshman; 23 - Vince Fiori - Junior; 24 - Alex Destino - Freshman; 26 - Matthew Vogel - Sophomore; 28 - John Parke - Sophomore; 32 - Canaan Cropper - Freshman; 37 - Wil Crowe - Sophomore; 39 - Reed Scott - Sophomore; 42 - Cody Mincey - Senior; 44 - Preston Johnson - Junior; 47 - Josh Reagan - Sophomore; Catchers: 16 - Logan Koch - Sophomore; 36 - Jared Martin - Junior; 38 - Hunter Taylor - Freshman; 50 - Thatcher Coleman - Sophomore	Infielders: 3 - Jared Williams - Freshman; 7 - DC Arendas - Junior; 8 - Marcus Mooney - Junior; 14 - Madison Stokes - Freshman; 15 - Jordan Gore - Sophomore; 22 - Max Schrock - Junior; 31 - Weber Pike - Sophomore; 33 - Kyle Martin - Senior; 34 - Collin Steagall - Junior; 48 - Matt Williams - Freshman; Outfielders: 4 - Connor Bright - Senior; 5 - Patrick Harrington - Senior; 10 - Clark Scolamiero - Freshman; 19 - Gene Cone - Sophomore; 30 - Elliott Caldwell - Senior

2015 South Carolina Gamecocks Baseball Roster & Bios http://www.gamecocksonline.com/sports/m-basebl/mtt/scar-m-basebl-mtt.html

=== Coaching staff ===
2015 South Carolina Gamecocks baseball coaching staff
- 2 Chad Holbrook – Head coach – 3 years
- 12 Jerry Meyers – Associate head coach - 5 years / 13 years
- 41 Sammy Esposito – Assistant coach - 8 years
- 55 Brian Buscher – Volunteer assistant coach - 3 years

2015 South Carolina Gamecocks Baseball Coaches & Bios https://web.archive.org/web/20110926074934/http://gamecocksonline.cstv.com/sports/m-basebl/mtt/scar-m-basebl-mtt.html#coaches

== Schedule ==
2015 South Carolina Gamecocks baseball game log
Regular season

February
Date	Opponent	Site/stadium	Score	Win	Loss	Save	Attendance	Overall record	SEC record
February 13	College of Charleston	Carolina Stadium • Columbia, SC	L 3–6	Clarke (1–0)	Wynkoop (0–1)	None	8,013	0–1	–
February 14	College of Charleston	Carolina Stadium • Columbia, SC	W 7–1	Crowe (1–0)	Helvey (0–1)	None	8,032	1–1	–
February 14	College of Charleston	Carolina Stadium • Columbia, SC	W 8–3	Murray (1–0)	Bauer (0–1)	Widener (1)	8,032	2–1	–
February 17	Furman	Carolina Stadium • Columbia, SC	W 5–2	Schmidt (1–0)	Greenfield (0–2)	Murray (1)	6,652	3–1	–
February 21	Northeastern	Carolina Stadium • Columbia, SC	W 10–1	Wynkoop (1–1)	Berger (1–1)	None	7,220	4–1	–
February 21	Northeastern	Carolina Stadium • Columbia, SC	W 6–0	Fiori (1–0)	Hunt (1–1)	None	7,220	5–1	–
February 22	Northeastern	Carolina Stadium • Columbia, SC	W 6–4	Schmidt (2–0)	Mulry (0–2)	Widener (2)	7,024	6–1	–
February 27	at Clemson	Doug Kingsmore Stadium • Clemson, SC	L 4–11	Crownover (2–0)	Crowe (1–1)	Schnell (1)	6,272	6–2	–
February 28	vs. Clemson	Fluor Field • Greenville, SC	W 4–1	Wynkoop (2–1)	Erwin (1–1)	Widener (3)	7,175	7–2	–

March
Date	Opponent	Site/stadium	Score	Win	Loss	Save	Attendance	Overall record	SEC record
March 2	Clemson	Carolina Stadium • Columbia, SC	L 0–7	Koerner (2–1)	Reagan (0–1)	None	8,242	7–3	–
March 3	Charleston Southern	Carolina Stadium • Columbia, SC	W 10–4	Parke (1–0)	Ministeri (0–1)	Fiori (1)	6,753	8–3	–
March 4	High Point	Carolina Stadium • Columbia, SC	W 11–3	P. Johnson (1–0)	Ripke (0–1)	None	7,013	9–3	–
March 6	Miami (OH)	Carolina Stadium • Columbia, SC	W 2–0	Crowe (2–1)	Powers (1–3)	Widener (4)	6,595	10–3	–
March 7	Miami (OH)	Carolina Stadium • Columbia, SC	W 7–0	Wynkoop (3–1)	Banks (1–3)	None	7,321	11–3	–
March 8	Miami (OH)	Carolina Stadium • Columbia, SC	W 5–3	Fiori (2–0)	Williams (0–1)	Widener (5)	6,992	12–3	–
March 10	Penn State	Carolina Stadium • Columbia, SC	W 3–0	Reagan (1–1)	Boylston (0–1)	Mincey (1)	6,947	13–3	–
March 11	Penn State	Carolina Stadium • Columbia, SC	W 13–3	P. Johnson (2–0)	Donmoyer (0–1)	None	6,566	14–3	–
March 13	Kentucky	Carolina Stadium • Columbia, SC	W 1-0	Crowe (3–1)	Brown (1–2)	None	6,604	15–3	1–0
March 14	Kentucky	Carolina Stadium • Columbia, SC	W 4–3	Wynkoop (4–1)	Beggs (2–2)	Widener (6)	7,025	16–3	2–0
March 15	Kentucky	Carolina Stadium • Columbia, SC	W 6–4^{10}	Widener (1–0)	Salow (1–1)	None	7,499	17–3	3–0
March 17	Winthrop	Carolina Stadium • Columbia, SC	L 5–7^{11}	Strain (2–0)	Mincey (0–1)	None	7,205	17–4	–
March 20	at Missouri	Taylor Stadium • Columbia, MO	L 2–3	McClain (4–1)	Crowe (3–2)	Williams (6)	786	17–5	3–1
March 21	at Missouri	Taylor Stadium • Columbia, MO	L 3–4^{10}	Williams (4–0)	Widener (1–1)	None	2,032	17–6	3–2
March 22	at Missouri	Taylor Stadium • Columbia, MO	W 7–5	Murray (2–0)	Tribby (0–1)	Fiori (2)	1,243	18–6	4–2
March 24	at Coastal Carolina	Springs Brooks Stadium • Conway, SC	L 8–9^{11}	Beckwith (2–0)	Widener (1–2)	None	3,086	18–7	–
March 28	Georgia	Carolina Stadium • Columbia, SC	L 5–6^{11}	Cheek (2–1)	Wynkoop (4–2)	None	7,491	18–8	4–3
March 28	Georgia	Carolina Stadium • Columbia, SC	L 3–4	McLaughlin (3–1)	Scott (0–1)	None	8,242	18–9	4–4
March 29	Georgia	Carolina Stadium • Columbia, SC	W 8–5	Murray (3–0)	Jones (0–2)	Wynkoop (1)	7,815	19–9	5–4
March 31	at The Citadel	Riley Park • Charleston, SC	W 2–0	Mincey (1–1)	Byelick (1–1)	Widener (7)	5,972	20–9	–

April
Date	Opponent	Site/stadium	Score	Win	Loss	Save	Attendance	Overall record	SEC record
April 2	at Mississippi State	Dudy Noble Field • Starkville, MS	L 2–13	Laster (4–1)	Crowe (3–3)	None	7,014	20–10	5–5
April 3	at Mississippi State	Dudy Noble Field • Starkville, MS	L 5–7	Brown (5–1)	Wynkoop (4–3)	Fitts (5)	6,682	20–11	5–6
April 4	at Mississippi State	Dudy Noble Field • Starkville, MS	W 13–7	Murray (4–0)	Tatum	None	7,527	21–11	6–6
April 7	Appalachian State	Carolina Stadium • Columbia, SC	W 11–1	Scott (1–1)	Mason (0–2)	None	7,216	22–11	–
April 8	The Citadel	Carolina Stadium • Columbia, SC	W 4–2	Fiori (3–0)	Watcher (0–1)	Widener (8)	8,075	23-11	–
April 10	at Florida	Alfred A. McKethan Stadium • Gainesville, FL	L 3–14	Poyner (2-1)	Crowe (3-4)	None	5,060	23-12	6-7
April 11	at Florida	Alfred A. McKethan Stadium • Gainesville, FL	L 5-12	Puk (6–3)	Wynkoop (4-4)	None	5,076	23-13	6–8
April 12	at Florida	Alfred A. McKethan Stadium • Gainesville, FL	L 2-12	Faedo (3-1)	Widener (1-3)	None	2,997	23-14	6-9
April 14	Presbyterian	Carolina Stadium • Columbia, SC							
April 16	Vanderbilt	Carolina Stadium • Columbia, SC							
April 17	Vanderbilt	Carolina Stadium • Columbia, SC							
April 18	Vanderbilt	Carolina Stadium • Columbia, SC							
April 21	vs Furman	Fluor Field • Greenville, SC							
April 24	at Tennessee	Lindsey Nelson Stadium • Knoxville, TN							
April 25	at Tennessee	Lindsey Nelson Stadium • Knoxville, TN							
April 26	at Tennessee	Lindsey Nelson Stadium • Knoxville, TN							

May
Date	Opponent	Site/stadium	Score	Win	Loss	Save	Attendance	Overall record	SEC record

Postseason

SEC Tournament
Date	Opponent	Site/stadium	Score	Win	Loss	Save	Attendance	Overall record	SECT Record

== Honors and awards ==
- Wil Crowe was named SEC Co-Pitcher of the Week on March 16,

== Record vs. conference opponents ==
Last two do not qualify for conf. tourn. Blank are not scheduled. Blue are home games, otherwise away.

2015 SEC baseball records Source: 2015 SEC baseball game results
Team	W–L	ALA	ARK	AUB	FLA	UGA	KEN	LSU	MSU	MIZZ	MISS	SCAR	TENN	TAMU	VAN	Team	Div	SR	SW
ALA	12–18		0–3	3–0	1–2	2–1	.	0–3	2–1	1–2	1–2	.	.	1–2	1–2	ALA	W6	3–7	1–2
ARK	17–12	3–0		2–1	.	2–1	2–1	1–2	2–1	.	2–1	.	1–1	2–1	0–3	ARK	W3	7–2	1–1
AUB	13–17	0–3	1–2		1–2	3–0	.	1–2	2–1	.	2–1	2–1	.	0–3	1–2	AUB	W5	4–6	1–2
FLA	19–11	2–1	.	2–1		2–1	1–2	.	3–0	1–2	1–2	3–0	2–1	.	2–1	FLA	E2	7–3	2–0
UGA	10–19	1–2	1–2	0–3	1–2		2–1	0–2	.	0–3	.	2–1	3–0	.	0–3	UGA	E7	3–7	1–3
KEN	14–15	.	1–2	.	2–1	1–2		2–1	2–1	2–1	.	0–3	3–0	0–2	1–2	KEN	E4	5–5	1–1
LSU	21–8	3–0	2–1	2–1	.	2–0	1–2		2–1	3–0	2–1	2–1	.	2–1	.	LSU	W1	9–1	2–0
MSU	8–22	1–2	1–2	1–2	0–3	.	1–2	1–2		.	0–3	2–1	0–3	1–2	.	MSU	W7	1–9	0–3
MIZZ	15–15	2–1	.	.	2–1	3–0	1–2	0–3	.		2–1	2–1	2–1	1–2	0–3	MIZZ	E3	6–4	1–2
MISS	15–14	2–1	1–2	1–2	2–1	.	.	1–2	3–0	1–2		.	1–2	1–1	2–1	MISS	W4	4–5	1–0
SCAR	13–17	.	.	1–2	0–3	1–2	3–0	1–2	1–2	1–2	.		1–2	2–1	2–1	SCAR	E5	3–7	1–1
TENN	11–18	.	1–1	.	1–2	0–3	0–3	.	3–0	1–2	2–1	2–1		0–3	1–2	TENN	E6	3–6	1–3
TAMU	18–10	2–1	1–2	3–0	.	.	2–0	1–2	2–1	2–1	1–1	1–2	3–0		.	TAMU	W2	6–3	2–0
VAN	20–10	2–1	3–0	2–1	1–2	3–0	2–1	.	.	3–0	1–2	1–2	2–1	.		VAN	E1	7–3	3–0
Team	W–L	ALA	ARK	AUB	FLA	UGA	KEN	LSU	MSU	MIZZ	MISS	SCAR	TENN	TAMU	VAN	Team	Div	SR	SW

Updated for entire regular season.

== Rankings ==
Ranking movements Legend: ██ Increase in ranking ██ Decrease in ranking
	Week																		
Poll	Pre	1	2	3	4	5	6	7	8	9	10	11	12	13	14	15	16	17	Final
Coaches'	10	10*	10*	8	8	6													
Baseball America	13	13	12	12	7	6													
Collegiate Baseball^	21	20	15	17	10	6													
NCBWA†	11	12	10	10	7	6													

^ Collegiate Baseball ranked 40 teams in their preseason poll, but only ranked 30 teams weekly during the season.
† NCBWA ranks 30 teams in their preseason poll, but only ranks 25 teams weekly during the season.
* A new poll was not released for this week, so for comparison purposes, the previous week's ranking is inserted in this week's slot.

== Gamecocks in the 2015 MLB draft ==
The following members of the South Carolina Gamecocks baseball program were drafted in the 2015 Major League Baseball draft.

Player	Position	Round	Overall	MLB team
