= Kevin O'Sullivan (baseball) =

American college baseball coach (born 1968)

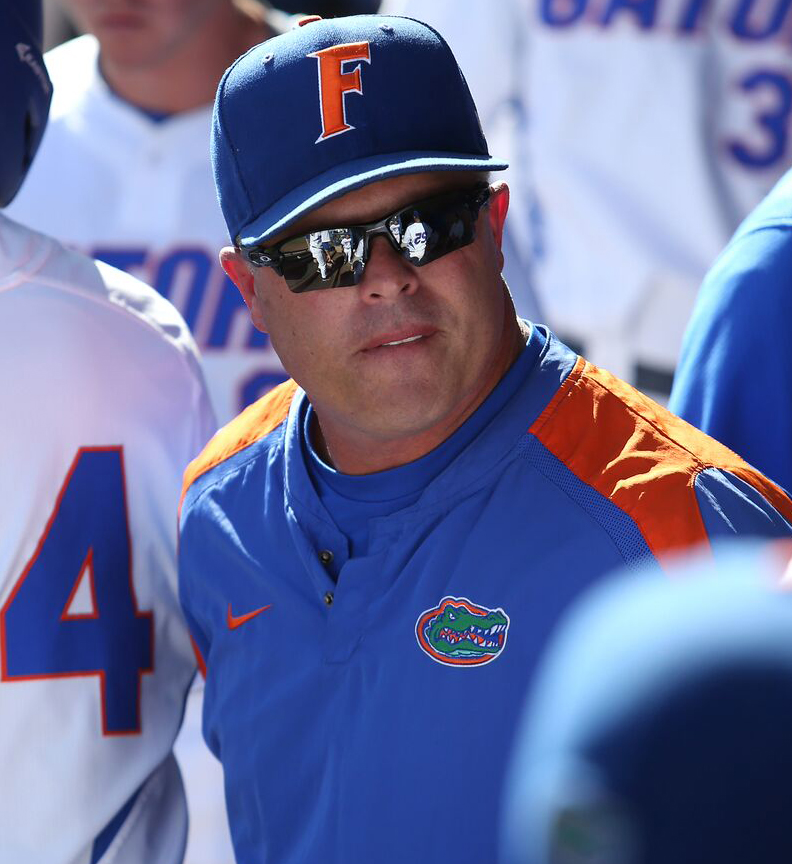

Current position
- Title: Head coach
- Team: Florida
- Conference: SEC
- Record: 797–392 (.670)
- Annual salary: $1.85 million

Biographical details
- Born: December 27, 1968 (age 57); Goshen, New York, U.S.
- Education: University of Virginia

Playing career
- 1990–1991: Virginia
- Position: Catcher

Coaching career (HC unless noted)
- 1992–1993: FCCJ (Asst.)
- 1994–1995: Florida Atlantic (Asst.)
- 1996–1997: Virginia (Asst.)
- 1998: GCL Twins (Asst.)
- 1999–2007: Clemson (Asst.)
- 2008–present: Florida

Head coaching record
- Overall: 797–392 (.670)

Accomplishments and honors

Championships
- NCAA Division I Tournament (2017); 9× NCAA Super Regional (2010–2012, 2015–2018, 2023, 2024); 10× NCAA Regional (2009–2012, 2015–2018, 2023, 2024); 2× SEC Tournament (2011, 2015); 6× SEC Regular Season (2010, 2011, 2014, 2017, 2018, 2023); 7× SEC Eastern Division (2009–2011, 2014, 2017, 2018, 2023)

Awards
- 3× SEC Coach of the Year (2010, 2014, 2018); Baseball America Coach of the Year (2011); D1Baseball.com Coach of the Year (2017); Skip Bertman Award (2017)

Kevin Michael O'Sullivan (born December 27, 1968) is an American college baseball coach and former player. O'Sullivan is the current head coach of the Florida Gators baseball team of the University of Florida. O'Sullivan is best known for leading the Gators to the program's first College World Series national championship win in 2017. O'Sullivan also led the program to three consecutive appearances in the College World Series from 2010 to 2012 and four consecutive appearances from 2015 to 2018. He became the winningest coach in program history in 2021, surpassing Dave Fuller's 1975 record of 557 wins.

== Early years ==
O'Sullivan was born December 27, 1968, in Goshen, New York. O'Sullivan attended Jupiter High School in Jupiter, Florida, and played high school baseball for the Jupiter Warriors. As a senior in 1987, he batted .438 with 17 RBIs and was an honorable-mention selection to the Florida Sportswriter's Association's Class 3A all-state team. As a junior, O'Sullivan was a starter on the Jensen Beach Post 126 team that won the 1986 American Legion World Series in Rapid City, South Dakota.

== College career ==
O'Sullivan was a catcher during his college playing career. He played his freshman and sophomore seasons at Florida Community College in Jacksonville, Florida, where he batted .325 with 35 RBIs as a sophomore to help lead the Stars to the 1989 state tournament. After his sophomore year, he transferred to the Virginia Cavaliers baseball team, where as a junior he batted .327 with 29 RBIs and a team-high 14 doubles and was an All-Atlantic Coast Conference selection. As a senior, he was an All-ACC selection and was named to the 1991 Atlantic Coast Conference baseball tournament All-Tournament Team.

O'Sullivan graduated from Florida Community College with an associate's degree in 1989, and earned a bachelor's degree in sports medicine in 1991 from the University of Virginia. He later earned a master's degree in exercise science and wellness from Florida Atlantic University in Boca Raton, Florida.

== Coaching career ==
After his collegiate career, O'Sullivan spent two seasons as an assistant coach at Florida Community College and another two at Florida Atlantic University before being hired as an assistant coach at Virginia in 1996. While serving as an assistant at FAU, O'Sullivan coached American Legion Post 271 in Jupiter, Florida, to the semifinals of the 1994 state tournament. In 1997, O'Sullivan managed the Bourne Braves, a collegiate summer baseball team in the prestigious Cape Cod Baseball League, and was named coach of the year. His Bourne team featured future major leaguer Mark Mulder. In 1998, O'Sullivan was named an assistant coach at Clemson University.

O'Sullivan accepted the baseball head coaching position at the University of Florida offered by athletics director Jeremy Foley on June 13, 2007, replacing Pat McMahon after the Gators failed to receive an NCAA tournament bid in either 2006 or 2007. Florida is O'Sullivan's first head coaching job; he is the twenty-first head coach in the history of the Gators baseball program. He spent the previous nine seasons as an assistant coach for the Clemson Tigers baseball team of Clemson University under head coach Jack Leggett, first as the Tigers' pitching coach and recruiting coordinator, and later as Leggett's associate head coach. During his tenure at Clemson, twenty-nine of the pitchers he coached were selected in the MLB draft.

In each of his four seasons coaching the Gators, O'Sullivan's teams have improved their overall win–loss record and Southeastern Conference (SEC) standing. In 2008, his first season as the Gators' skipper, the team finished 34–24 overall, 17–13 in SEC play, in second place in the SEC Eastern Division standings and third in the overall SEC standings. In 2009, the Gators compiled an overall record of 42–22, 19–11 in the SEC, in first place in the SEC East. O'Sullivan's 2010 Gators finished with an overall win–loss record of 47–17, 22–8 in SEC play, and SEC regular season champions. In each of his first three seasons, his Gators also showed post-season improvement, too: early elimination in the NCAA Regional in 2008; progressing to the NCAA Super Regional in 2009; and a berth in the College World Series in 2010.

In 2011, the Gators finished the regular season 41–15 overall, 22–8 in the SEC, and SEC regular season co-champions—sharing the regular season conference championship with the South Carolina Gamecocks and Vanderbilt Commodores. After winning the SEC tournament, O'Sullivan's Gators received the No. 2 seed in the 2011 NCAA tournament, and advanced to their second consecutive College World Series, ultimately finishing as the national runner-up.

O'Sullivan has also enjoyed recruiting success: his 2009 recruiting class was ranked No. 1 in the country by Collegiate Baseball Newspaper and Baseball America. It was the first time in Gators baseball history that a recruiting class was ranked No. 1.

Through O'Sullivan's first four regular seasons as the Gators' head coach, his Gators teams compiled the best conference win–loss record of 80–40 (.667), just ahead of the South Carolina Gamecocks (75–45) and the Vanderbilt Commodores (65–51).

== Suspension ==
O'Sullivan was suspended for the first three games of the 2026 season due to unsportsmanlike conduct during the 2025 Conway Regional at Coastal Carolina University. The NCAA Division I Baseball Committee also issued a public reprimand against O'Sullivan's behavior.

In late October 2025, he took a self-imposed leave of absence to address family matters. He officially returned to his head coaching duties on Dec. 17, 2025.

== Minor League coaching ==
In 1998, O'Sullivan served as an assistant coach for the Gulf Coast Twins (34-26), a Rookie League affiliate in Fort Myers, Florida.

== Personal ==
While coaching at Clemson, O'Sullivan married Victoria Diane Vought, a pediatric nurse and Florida State University graduate, in Palm Beach Gardens, Florida. O'Sullivan has one daughter, Payton, born in December 2010, and son, Finn, born in September 2012.

== Head coaching record ==
Record table
Season	Team	Overall	Conference	Standing	Postseason
Florida Gators (Southeastern Conference) (2008–present)
2008	Florida	34–24	17–13	2nd (Eastern)	NCAA Regional
2009	Florida	42–22	19–11	1st (Eastern)	NCAA Super Regional
2010	Florida	47–17	22–8	1st (Eastern)	College World Series
2011	Florida	53–19	22–8	T–1st (Eastern)	College World Series runner-up
2012	Florida	47–20	18–12	T–2nd (Eastern)	College World Series
2013	Florida	29–30	14–16	3rd (Eastern)	NCAA Regional
2014	Florida	40–23	21–9	1st (Eastern)	NCAA Regional
2015	Florida	52–18	19–11	2nd (Eastern)	College World Series semifinals
2016	Florida	52–16	19–10	2nd (Eastern)	College World Series
2017	Florida	52–19	21–9	1st (Eastern)	College World Series champions
2018	Florida	49–21	20–10	1st (Eastern)	College World Series semifinals
2019	Florida	34–26	13–17	5th (Eastern)	NCAA Regional
2020	Florida	16–1	0–0	Canceled (Note: Remainder of season was canceled in response to the COVID-19 pandemic)	Canceled
2021	Florida	38–22	17–13	3rd (Eastern)	NCAA Regional
2022	Florida	42–24	15–15	T–2nd (Eastern)	NCAA Regional
2023	Florida	54–17	20–10	1st (Eastern)	College World Series runner-up
2024	Florida	36–30	13–17	T–4th (Eastern)	College World Series semifinals
2025	Florida	39–22	15–15	T–10th	NCAA Regional
2026	Florida	41–21	18–12	T–4th	NCAA Regional
Florida:		797–392 (.670)	323–216 (.599)		
Total:		797–392 (.670)			
National champion Postseason invitational champion Conference regular season champion Conference regular season and conference tournament champion Division regular season champion Division regular season and conference tournament champion Conference tournament champion

== See also ==
- Florida Gators
- History of the University of Florida
- List of current NCAA Division I baseball coaches
- List of University of Virginia alumni
- University Athletic Association
- Virginia Cavaliers
