= Buddy Reed =

American baseball player (born 1995)

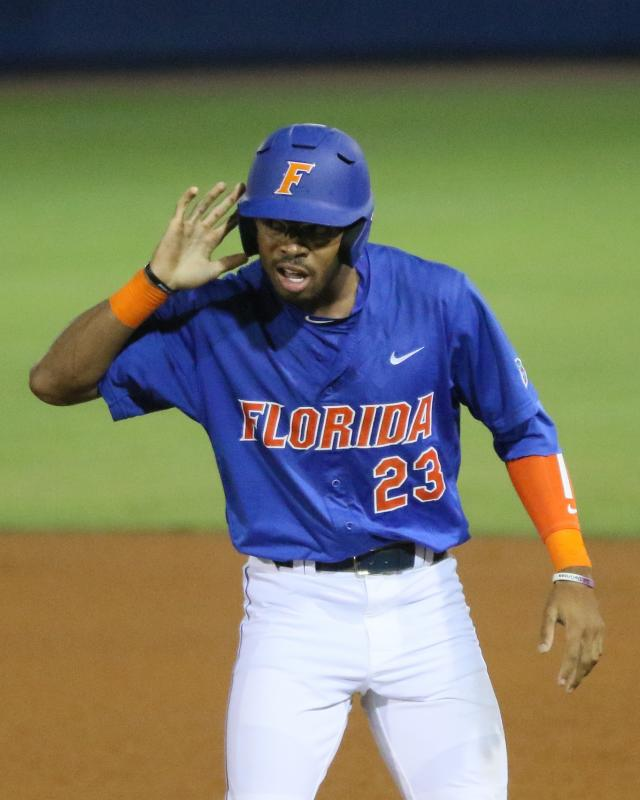
- Reed with the Florida Gators in 2016

Kansas City Monarchs – No. 15
- Pitcher
- Born: April 27, 1995 (age 31); The Bronx, New York, U.S.
- Bats: Switch Throws: Right

Michael Elliott Reed (born April 27, 1995) is an American professional baseball pitcher and former outfielder for the Kansas City Monarchs of the American Association of Professional Baseball.

== Early life and education ==
Reed attended St. George's School in Middletown, Rhode Island on an ice hockey scholarship. At St. George's, he played baseball, hockey and soccer. He held multiple scholarship offers to play NCAA Division I ice hockey.

== Amateur career ==
Reed was drafted by the Texas Rangers in the 35th round of the 2013 Major League Baseball draft. He did not sign and attended the University of Florida where he played college baseball for the Florida Gators.

As a freshman at Florida in 2014, Reed started 51 of 60 games, hitting .244 over 172 at-bats. After a 1–14 start in his sophomore year in 2015, he started wearing glasses on the field. That year he started 69 of 70 games and hit .305/.367/.433 with four home runs, 47 runs batted in (RBI) and 18 stolen bases. After the season, he played for the United States collegiate national team during the summer. In 2015, he batted .305 with four home runs and 47 RBIs. As a junior in 2016, he batted .262 with four home runs, 32 RBIs and 24 stolen bases.

== Professional career ==
=== San Diego Padres ===
After his junior year, Reed was drafted by the San Diego Padres in the second round, with the 48th overall selection, of the 2016 Major League Baseball draft. He signed and was assigned to the Low–A Tri-City Dust Devils, where he spent all of his first professional season, batting .254 with 13 RBIs and 15 stolen bases in 51 games. In 2017, he played for the Single–A Fort Wayne TinCaps where he posted a .234 batting average with six home runs and 35 RBI in 88 games.

In 2018, he played with both the High–A Lake Elsinore Storm and the Double–A San Antonio Missions, slashing .271/.319/.435 with 13 home runs, 62 RBI, and 51 stolen bases in 122 games between both teams. He spent 2019 with the Double–A Amarillo Sod Poodles, hitting .228 with 14 home runs, 50 RBI, and 23 stolen bases over 121 games.

=== Oakland Athletics ===
On December 12, 2019, Reed was traded to the Oakland Athletics as the player to be named later in the Jurickson Profar trade. Reed did not play in a game in 2020 due to the cancellation of the minor league season because of the COVID-19 pandemic. In 2021, Reed spent the majority of the year with the Triple-A Las Vegas Aviators, hitting .255/.367/.363 with one home run and 14 RBI.

In 2022, he played in 20 games for Las Vegas, slashing .196/.255/.196 with no home runs and 3 RBI. He was released by the Athletics on May 10, 2022.

=== Los Angeles Dodgers ===
On June 18, 2022, Reed signed a minor league contract with the Los Angeles Dodgers organization. He then appeared in 28 games for the Double-A Tulsa Drillers. He hit .247 between Tulsa, Las Vegas, and the rookie-level Arizona Complex League Dodgers. In 2023, he played in eight games for the Triple-A Oklahoma City Dodgers, hitting .191/.320/.571 with 2 home runs and 6 RBI. Reed was released by the Dodgers on April 29, 2023.

=== Milwaukee Brewers ===
On May 13, 2023, Reed signed a minor league contract with the Milwaukee Brewers organization. In 29 games for the Triple–A Nashville Sounds, he batted .207/.311/.326 with 2 home runs, 11 RBI, and 4 stolen bases. On July 13, Reed was released by the Brewers.

=== Texas Rangers ===
On December 18, 2023, Reed signed a minor league contract with the Texas Rangers. While with the organization, he converted into a pitcher. In 20 appearances out of the bullpen for the rookie–level Arizona Complex League Rangers, Reed compiled a 2–2 record and 3.14 ERA with 38 strikeouts across 28 2/3 innings pitched. He was released by the Rangers organization on July 29, 2024.

=== Gastonia Baseball Club ===
On August 4, 2024, Reed signed with the Gastonia Baseball Club of the Atlantic League of Professional Baseball. In 2 games for the team, he allowed 6 runs on 5 hits with 2 strikeouts over 2 innings pitched. Reed was released by Gastonia on August 16.

=== Mississippi Mud Monsters ===
On March 13, 2025, Reed signed with the Mississippi Mud Monsters of the Frontier League. In 15 appearances for Mississippi, Reed compiled an 0-1 record and 1.83 ERA with 28 strikeouts and two saves across 19 2/3 innings pitched.

=== Long Island Ducks ===
On June 26, 2025, Reed was traded to the Long Island Ducks of the Atlantic League of Professional Baseball. He made 23 appearances for Long Island, compiling a 1-0 record and 5.06 ERA with 21 strikeouts and five saves across 21 1/3 innings pitched.

On April 8, 2026, Reed re-signed with the Ducks. In 17 appearances for Long Island, he struggled to an 0–1 record and 10.13 ERA with 21 strikeouts over 16 innings of work.

=== Cleburne Railroaders ===
On June 19, 2026, Reed was traded to the Cleburne Railroaders of the American Association of Professional Baseball to complete a previous transaction that saw Long Island acquire Chris Roller.

=== Kansas City Monarchs ===
On June 21, 2026, Reed signed with the Kansas City Monarchs of the American Association of Professional Baseball.

=== Cleburne Railroaders (second stint) ===
On August 19, 2026, Reed was traded to the Cleburne Railroaders of the American Association of Professional Baseball in exchange for Austin Krob.
