= Hoover Metropolitan Stadium =

Baseball stadium in Hoover, Alabama, US

Coordinates: 33°20′18.22″N 86°50′58.74″W

- The Hoover Met
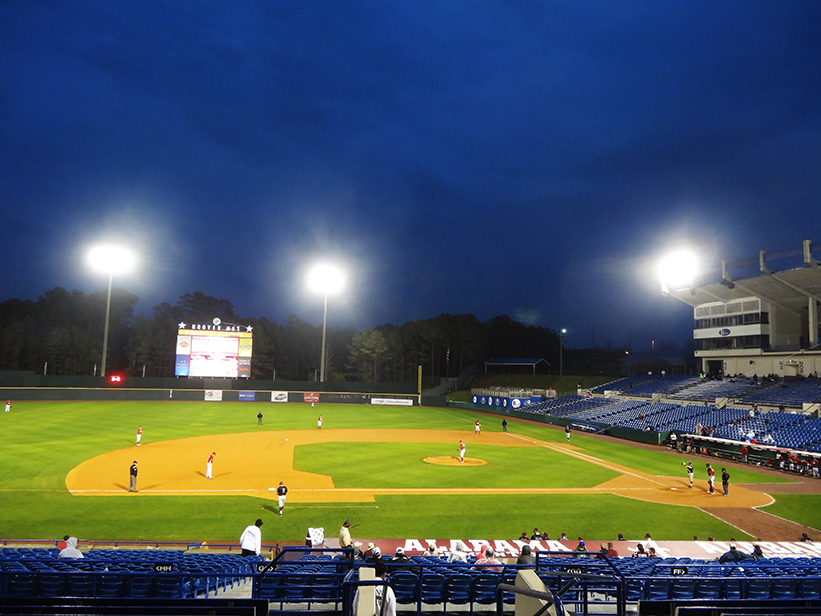
- Night view of the stadium in 2015
- Interactive map of Hoover Metropolitan Stadium
- Former names: Regions Park (2007–2012)
- Location: 100 Ben Chapman Drive, Hoover, Alabama 35244
- Owner: City of Hoover
- Operator: City of Hoover
- Capacity: 10,800
- Surface: Tifway 419 Bermuda Grass
- Field size: Left Field: 340 ft (100 m); Left-Center Field: 385 ft (117 m); Center Field: 405 ft (123 m); Right-Center Field: 385 ft (117 m); Right Field: 340 ft (100 m)

Construction
- Groundbreaking: 1987
- Opened: April 16, 1988
- Cost: $14.5 million ($39.5 million in 2025 dollars)
- Architects: Gresham, Smith and Partners (Architect of Record), Populous (Design Architect)
- Project manager: Harbert Commercial Construction Division
- General contractor: Harbert HPS Division

Tenants
- Birmingham Barons (SL) 1988–2012; Hoover Buccaneers football (AHSAA) 1988–2010, 2012–present Alabama Crimson Tide (NCAA) 2015

Website
- hooveral.org/metropolitan-stadium

Hoover Metropolitan Stadium, also known as The Hoover Met, is a baseball stadium located in Hoover, Alabama, United States, a suburb of Birmingham. It was home of the Birmingham Barons of the Southern League from 1988 to 2012, replacing historic Rickwood Field in Birmingham. The stadium also serves as the home for the SEC baseball tournament, as well as the primary home for Hoover High School football. It is located in the Birmingham-Hoover Metropolitan Area near Interstate 459 at Exit 10 just off Alabama State Route 150. The stadium is located three miles from the Riverchase Galleria, one of the south's largest shopping centers.

Its seating capacity is 10,800 for baseball and can accommodate up to 16,000 when the patio, banquet, and grassy side areas are used. The stadium also houses 12 suites and state-of-the-art dressing and training rooms. The stadium also features a meeting/banquet room named for Michael Jordan, who played for the Barons during his brief foray into professional baseball, during which time the stadium experienced its largest crowds for professional baseball.

The opening daytime baseball game scene from Space Jam was filmed at this stadium. Its nighttime scene featuring the spaceship was filmed at Blair Field in Long Beach, California. The City of Hoover operates the stadium as part of the Hoover Met Complex, which includes the Finley Center indoor multi-sport facility, an outdoor complex of multi-sport and baseball/softball fields, a tennis complex with 16 hard courts, and an adjacent recreational vehicle (RV) park.

The Hoover Met hosted the AVP Birmingham Open on July 13–16, 2006, the first beach volleyball tournament to ever be played in Alabama. The feature court was above the baseball diamond as well as eight other courts on the field, made of 222 tons of sand per court.

The stadium also played host to the 2011 and 2012 NCAA Division I Men's Soccer Championship.

Along with Birmingham city officials, the Barons announced plans in November 2010 to return to Birmingham with a new field to be constructed downtown, near the University of Alabama at Birmingham campus. Pending contract negotiations and construction, play at the new field was originally expected to begin with the 2012 season. Due to site selection, financing issues, and problems obtaining all of the land sought by the developers, the move was delayed until the 2013 season.

Naming rights to The Met were purchased through the Barons by Regions Financial Corporation in 2007, resulting in the stadium being renamed Regions Park. On December 20, 2012 – following the Barons' exit – the City of Hoover announced it was changing the name of the ballpark back to its original name, Hoover Metropolitan Stadium, effective January 1, 2013. Regions continued its sponsorship of the Barons, and the team's new stadium in Birmingham became known as Regions Field.

The Hoover Met hosted the Alabama Crimson Tide during the 2015 season while its on-campus stadium in Tuscaloosa, Sewell–Thomas Stadium, underwent major renovations. As part of the agreement, outfield fences were moved in to more closely match the dimensions of TD Ameritrade Park Omaha, home of the College World Series. The new configuration remained in place for the 2015 Southeastern Conference baseball tournament.

The Hoover Met also hosted Softball at the 2022 World Games.

The Birmingham Stallions of the United Football League openly considered moving to Hoover Metropolitan Stadium in 2026 to more appropriately accommodate the size of crowds the team was drawing. A positive response to a season ticket drive prompted the team to remain at its previous stadium Protective Stadium. The mayor of Hoover publicly rejected the Stallions in a July 2026 statement and remarked that the stadium was in its baseball configuration during that season and was already booked solid through 2028.

| Preceded by Harder Stadium | Host of the College Cup; 2011–2012 | Succeeded by PPL Park |
